= Bloodstock =

Bloodstock may refer to:

- Bloodstock Open Air, a heavy metal music festival held in England
- Foundation bloodstock, animals that are the foundation of a breed or bloodline
- Thoroughbred horses
