= Deadfall (band) =

English thrash metal band

- Origin: Nottingham, England
- Genre: Thrash metal
- Years active: 2005–2007, 2008
- Label: None
- Members: Mike Thompson; Jimmi Mansell; Pete Mather
- Past members: Dave Turner; Ryan Ashley
- Website: http://www.deadfall-band.com http://www.myspace.com/deadfallband

Deadfall was an English thrash metal band from Nottingham, England. Picking up where guitarist Mike Thompson's old band Polaris had ceased, Deadfall were among a collection of new fast rising thrash bands hailing from the UK, as part of the 'new wave' of UK thrash metal. Other such names include Headless Cross, Pitiful Reign and Evile.

Deadfall released three recordings, Ordeal By Fire EP (2005), Fatal Deterrent (2006) and Vicious Vendetta EP (2006).

== Early days ==
On their second gig, Deadfall, along with 60 other bands, entered the well respected Junktion 7 Battle of the Bands competition in the summer of 2005 with Mike Thompson on guitar and vocals, Dave Turner on lead guitar, Jimmi Mansell on bass guitar and Pete Mather providing the drums. The band's performance was met with rave reviews and they subsequently went on to win the competition, with Mather taking away the prize for Best Drummer in the process.

2005 also saw the release of the band's first EP, Ordeal By Fire, featuring a combination of updated versions of Thompson's old Polaris era songs and Deadfall originals. The EP was greeted with generally positive reactions, and earned the band enough credibility to continue widespread performances.

== 2006-2007 ==
The band spent the first few months of 2006 touring widely, but due to internal differences Dave Turner departed the band in the second quarter. Whilst the band located a new lead guitarist, they produced their second release, the album Fatal Deterrent, featuring what can be described as the definitive versions of many of the Ordeal By Fire tracks, and a collection of new material.

In early 2006, Deadfall were asked to play the prestigious Bloodstock metal festival, and in the autumn of that year, with new addition Ryan Ashley on lead guitar, the band successfully co-headlined the second stage, receiving positive reactions. Shortly after, Deadfall's third release, Vicious Vendetta, featuring all original material was released, and the band secured a support slot on the 2006 UK tour of thrash metal act Exodus at Junktion 7, Nottingham. Towards the end of 2006, Ashley left the group due to other commitments, and as 2007 began the band started searching for a new lead guitarist.

== Split, subsequent reform and split ==
In March 2007, Deadfall officially split to pursue various side projects, with Mike and Pete appearing in the neo-thrash band Cynapse, and Jimmi playing bass guitar for traditional thrashers Territory. However, following a successful one-off show at Junktion 7 and increased fan pressure, the band officially reformed in August 2007, and were in the process of finalising new songs and booking an extensive come-back tour. But they split up again in late 2007 though they did reunite for one last show in August 2008, according to their Myspace page.

== Discography ==
Ordeal By Fire (2005)

1. State Of The Art
2. Second To None
3. Nine Lies
4. Ordeal By Fire
5. Life Or Death
6. Hold My Own

Fatal Deterrent (2006)

1. State Of The Art
2. Ordeal By Fire
3. The Powers That Be
4. Second To None
5. Hold My Own
6. Obliterate
7. Pandemonium
8. Nine Lies
9. Resistance Is Futile

Vicious Vendetta (2006)

1. Vicious Vendetta
2. Point Of Death
3. Lethal Dosage (Of Evil)

=== Contributed tracks to ===
- Thrashing Like a Maniac (Compilation, 2007)
