= Acid Throne =

English doom metal band

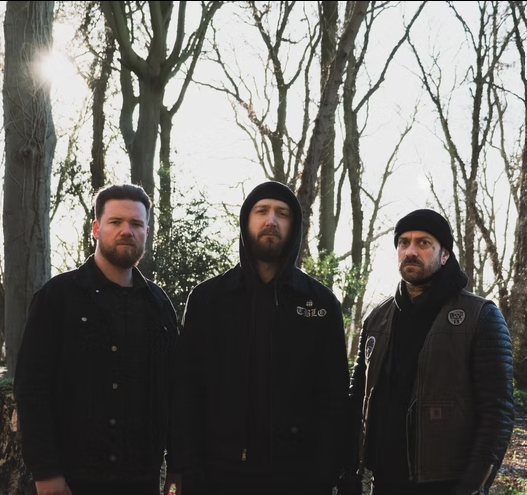

Background information
- Origin: Norwich,Norfolk,England
- Genres: doom metal; Stoner rock; experimental metal
- Years active: 2021-present
- Members: Chris Farrar (drums, vocals); Matt Stembrowicz (guitar, bass, vocals); Jack Andrews (guitar, bass, vocals)
- Website: acidthrone.com

Acid Throne is a British doom metal band from Norwich, Norfolk, drawing in elements of black metal, hardcore and stoner rock.

== History ==
Acid Throne was founded in October 2021 by drummer-vocalist Chris Farrar, bassist-vocalist and guitarist Matt Stembrowicz, guitarist Craig Smith and singer-guitarist Chris Kemp. Soon after the band formed, they secured a slot on the Jägermeister stage at Bloodstock Open Air Festival as a result of a joint win at Bloodstock's Metal to the Masses competition in 2022. Acid Throne first played at Bloodstock Open Air on Sunday 14 August 2022.

The band released its first EP, The Demo, in April 2022, with Craig Smith leaving before the band recorded its first full album, Kingdom's Death, at Foel Studio in Wales in April 2023 The album was released digitally and on vinyl during September 2023, with CD release supported by Trepanation Recordings. The video for "War Torn", the first single released from Kingdom's Death, was shot by independent filmmaker Scott Jarvis and premiered with Decibel Magazine shortly ahead of the album launch. The album entered the UK Doom Charts at #32 shortly after its release. Kerrang gave Kingdom's Death a 4/5 review, while Distorted Sound scored it 9/10. Other reviews of Kingdom's Death and The Demo appeared in The Razor's Edge, GBHBL, Outlaws of The Sun, and the Robert Carrigan podcast.

In July 2023, Acid Throne toured England with Irish doom band Tooms, playing venues in Chelmsford, London, Bristol and Southampton. The tour followed an extended run of one-off shows, including working with Burner on their album release show. Acid Throne next completed a UK tour with Cancer Bats as Bat Sabbath during January 2024, ahead of appearances at Desertfest London and Stoomfest. Following the interest generated by this tour, Acid Throne were featured in the Orange Amplifiers "Spotlight" series. Reviewing a live show for Metal Hammer in February 2024, Jonathan Seltzer described the performance as a "caustic, claustrophobic doom stomp, wielding tungsten-weight riffs" and that Acid Throne sound like "an army clubbing its defeated opponents even further into the mud".

The band's first international tour took place in October and November 2024 and included the Siege of Limerick, with Chris Farrar and Matt Stembrowicz performing as a two-piece throughout. Following Chris Kemp's departure from the band in 2024, guitarist-vocalist and bass player Tom Clutterbuck joined as a temporary third member from February to September 2025. The band performed at Reykjadoom 2025 in Iceland with the new line-up, ahead of Jack Andrews joining the band as a permanent member in October of the same year, and returned to Bloodstock festival in August 2026.

== Members ==
=== Current ===
- Chris Farrar - drums, vocals (2021–present)
- Matt Stembrowicz - vocals, guitar, bass (2021–present)
- Jack Andrews - vocals, guitar, bass (2025-present)

=== Former ===
- Chris Kemp - vocals, guitar (2021–2024)
- Craig Smith - guitar (2021–2023)
- Tom Clutterbuck - vocals, guitar, bass (2025)

== Discography ==
=== EPs ===
- The Demo (2022)

=== Albums ===
- Kingdom's Death (2023)
