= Bloodstock Open Air =

Heavy metal festival in England

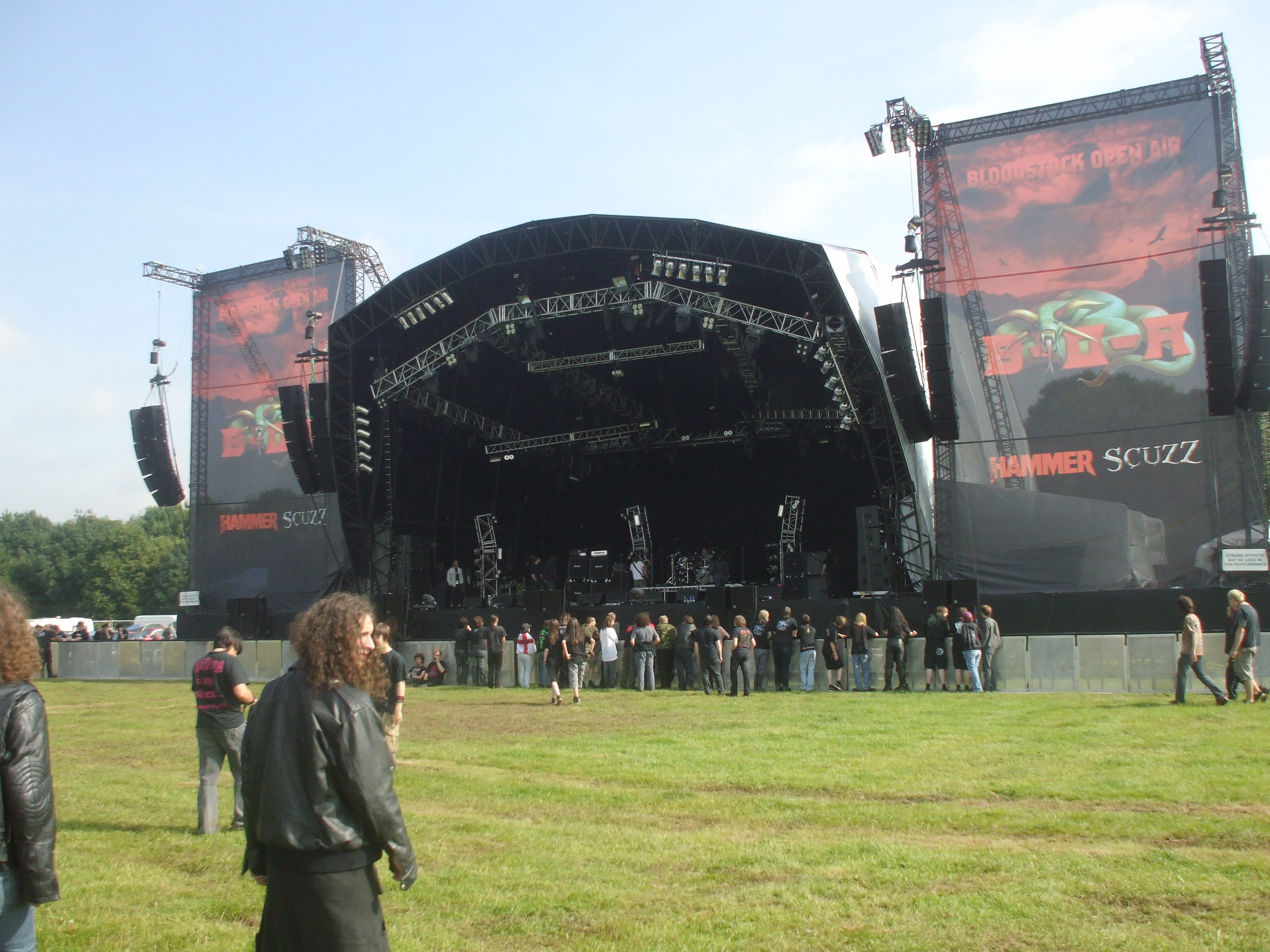
- Main stage in 2009
- Genre: Heavy metal, extreme metal
- Dates: 2nd weekend in August
- Locations: Walton-on-Trent, Derbyshire, England, United Kingdom
- Years active: 2005–present
- Founders: Paul Raymond Gregory, Vince Brotheridge
- Capacity: 20,000
- Website: Bloodstock Open Air

Bloodstock Open Air is a heavy metal-based rock festival held yearly each August since 2005 at Catton Hall in Derbyshire, England. It is described as the United Kingdom's largest independent metal festival, with more than 100 bands playing on several stages and around 20,000 attendees. It is similar to Leicestershire's Download Festival, but Bloodstock is smaller, traditionally focuses on heavy metal, and includes underground bands as well as mainstream ones. Bloodstock has a New Blood stage, reserved for at least thirty new and unsigned bands; these are chosen through 'Metal to the Masses' regional battle of the bands contests held throughout the UK and Ireland.

Bloodstock began in 2001 as an indoor event at the Derby Assembly Rooms, gradually growing in size and becoming an outdoor festival in 2005. It is one of only two open-air heavy metal festivals in the UK, although in recent years it has begun to include non-metal bands as headliners. Bloodstock's main stages are named after Ronnie James Dio and Sophie Lancaster. Bloodstock also hosts a bust that holds the ashes of Lemmy from Motörhead.

== History ==
Bloodstock Open Air was conceived as an extension of the original Bloodstock indoor festival which ran from 2001 until 2006 at Derby Assembly Rooms. After an amicable parting in 2006 with his business partner Vince Brotheridge, in 2006 Paul Gregory brought his daughters Vicky Hungerford, Rachael Greenfield and son Adam Gregory on board as directors.

Originally on one stage only, the festival expanded to incorporate a second stage in 2006. Known simply as The Unsigned Stage, it was designed to provide a platform for the next generation of metal talent to reach a wider audience. In 2010 it was renamed The New Blood Stage.

2007 saw further expansion with the addition of a third stage, originally called The Lava Stage, which in 2009 became the Sophie Lancaster Stage. In 2010 the capacity of this stage was increased and it became the festival's second stage.

In 2010, Heaven & Hell was scheduled to headline Bloodstock Open Air, but pulled out due to the death of singer Ronnie James Dio. The main stage at the festival was subsequently renamed as the "Ronnie James Dio stage" in tribute to him.

In an interview in 2014, festival director Adam Gregory stated, "We're not trying to be Download and we're not trying to be Sonisphere ... Bloodstock is and always will be a metal festival". He said that "Bloodstock's got its own identity and its own branding and we want to make it different to everywhere else you might go". He also voiced his dislike for pop metal bands such as Babymetal.

The 2020 festival was planned to be a celebration of "20 years of Bloodstock" however the festival was postponed due to the COVID-19 pandemic. Ticket holders were given the option either to have a refund on their ticket or to roll it over to the 2021 festival which saw three stages expanded to include an extra day.

=== Overview by year ===
Overview of Bloodstock by year
Event	Year	Date	Headliners	Notes
1st	2001	28 May	Saxon and Orange Goblin	indoor festival
2nd	2002	31 August	Blind Guardian and Return to the Sabbat	indoor festival
3rd	2003	29–30 August	Saxon and Nightwish	indoor festival
4th	2004	3–4 September	Gamma Ray and Children of Bodom	indoor festival
5th	2005	24–25 June (open air); 2–3 September (indoor)	Sebastian Bach and Children of Bodom (open air); HammerFall and Within Temptation (indoor)	both indoor and open air
6th	2006	14–15 July (open air); 29–30 September (indoor)	Stratovarius and Edguy (open air); Primal Fear and My Dying Bride (indoor)	both indoor and open air
7th	2007	16–18 August	Testament, Lacuna Coil, In Flames, Arch Enemy	became a full open-air festival and extended to three days
8th	2008	15–17 August	Opeth, Dimmu Borgir, Nightwish	
9th	2009	14–16 August	Carcass, Cradle of Filth, Blind Guardian, Europe	
10th	2010	13–15 August	Twisted Sister, Opeth, Children of Bodom, Fear Factory	main stage named after Ronnie James Dio following his death
11th	2011	12–14 August	W.A.S.P., Immortal, Motörhead	
12th	2012	10–12 August	Behemoth, Machine Head, Alice Cooper	
13th	2013	9–11 August	King Diamond, Lamb of God, Slayer	
14th	2014	8–10 August	Down, Emperor, Megadeth	
15th	2015	6–9 August	Trivium, Within Temptation, Rob Zombie	
16th	2016	11–14 August	Twisted Sister, Mastodon, Slayer	
17th	2017	10–13 August	Amon Amarth, Ghost, Megadeth	
18th	2018	9–12 August	Judas Priest, Gojira, Nightwish	
19th	2019	8–11 August	Sabaton, Parkway Drive, Scorpions	
—	2020	—	—	cancelled due to the COVID-19 pandemic
20th	2021	11–15 August	Devin Townsend, Kreator, Judas Priest	extra day added for this year
21st	2022	11–14 August	Behemoth, Mercyful Fate, Lamb of God	
22nd	2023	10–13 August	Killswitch Engage, Meshuggah, Megadeth	
23rd	2024	8–11 August	Opeth, Architects, Amon Amarth	Lemmy's ashes displayed for the first time
24th	2025	7–10 August	Trivium, Machine Head, Gojira	
25th	2026	6–9 August	Saxon, Lamb of God, Slaughter to Prevail, Judas Priest	main stage opened for four days
26th	2027	5–8 August	Mercyful Fate, Electric Callboy, Motionless in White	first year featuring mostly metalcore headliners

== Bloodstock UK Metalfest ==
Bloodstock originally began as an indoor festival held in Derby Assembly Rooms which ran for six years, 2001 to 2006. In order to associate the festival roots with Derby, where founder Paul Gregory lives, the festival's mascot/logo was based on the tale of The Derby Ram; a beast so large that, when a butcher finally slaughtered it, he drowned in the Ram's blood. A competition was run to name the beast and 'S-tan' was selected, he has appeared on almost all Bloodstock artwork since only missing from the first three BOA festivals when the S-tan snake featured instead.

=== 2001 ===
The first year was a one-day event headlined by Saxon, whom Paul Gregory had known personally since being commissioned to do the artwork for their 1984 Crusader album. Attendance for the festival topped 700 people and, despite taking an (expected) financial loss, a second festival was arranged for the following year.

Monday 28 May
Main Stage	Darwin Stage
Saxon; Glenn Hughes; Blaze; Skyclad; Primal Fear; Dirty Deeds; Area 54; Shadowkeep	Orange Goblin; Return to the Sabbat; Freebase; Consumed; Underule; Evoke; Occupational Hazard; Bloodstream

=== 2002 ===
2002 saw Blind Guardian headlining, again a band Paul Gregory knew through producing their artwork, which was their first UK show. Bringing metal acts to the UK for the first time become a regular occurrence for Bloodstock and the stronger line-up which also included Gamma Ray as second billing doubled the festival's attendance to approximately 1500.

Saturday 31 August
Main Stage	Darwin Stage
Blind Guardian; Gamma Ray; Diamond Head; Threshold; Balance of Power; Freedom Call; Biomechanical	Return to the Sabbat; Bal-Sagoth; Elvenking; Primordial; Enemymaker 888; Twelvepointhead; Infobia

=== 2003 ===
2003 brought the first of many expansions to the festival as it stretched across two days. The first day was headlined by a returning Saxon and the second by Nightwish whom like Blind Guardian the year before were playing their first UK show. Paul and Gregory had gone on tour with Saxon the previous year and it was then that Vince first saw Nightwish which convinced them they should be booked for the Bloodstock festival. This year also featured Edguy's first UK show as they were drafted in to replace HammerFall after guitarist Oscar Dronjak broke his arm in a motorcycle accident only weeks before the show. The full line-up was:

Friday 29 August
Main Stage

Saxon
Blaze
Power Quest
5th Man Down
Biomechanical

Saturday 30 August
Main Stage	Darwin Stage
Nightwish; Paradise Lost; Edguy; Masterplan; Saracen; DragonForce; Illuminatus; Mercury Rain	Biomechanical; F.U.L.C. Waylander; Fourwaykill; Invey; Bates Motel; Ninedenine; Cruel Humanity; Bumsnogger

=== 2004 ===
2004 saw continued growth in attendance with the festival selling out and brought Gamma Ray back to headline the first day and Children of Bodom headlined the second day. The full line-up was:

Friday 3 September
Main Stage	Femme Fatale Stage
Gamma Ray; Threshold; Sinergy; Illuminatus; Infobia	Season's End; Invey; Liquid Sky; Super Massive Object

Saturday 4 September
Main Stage	Darwin Stage
Children of Bodom; Sonata Arctica; Primal Fear; Balance of Power; Evergrey; Edenbridge; Panic Cell; Intense	Fourway Kill; Cruachan; The Prophecy; Gutworm; Nowhere Near the Garden; Humanity; Seven Years Dead; Rezin 69

=== 2005 ===
2005 was the first year which saw both the indoor and outdoor festivals running. HammerFall were booked to play, now with a headline slot on the first day, and Within Temptation headlined the second day. The full line-up was:

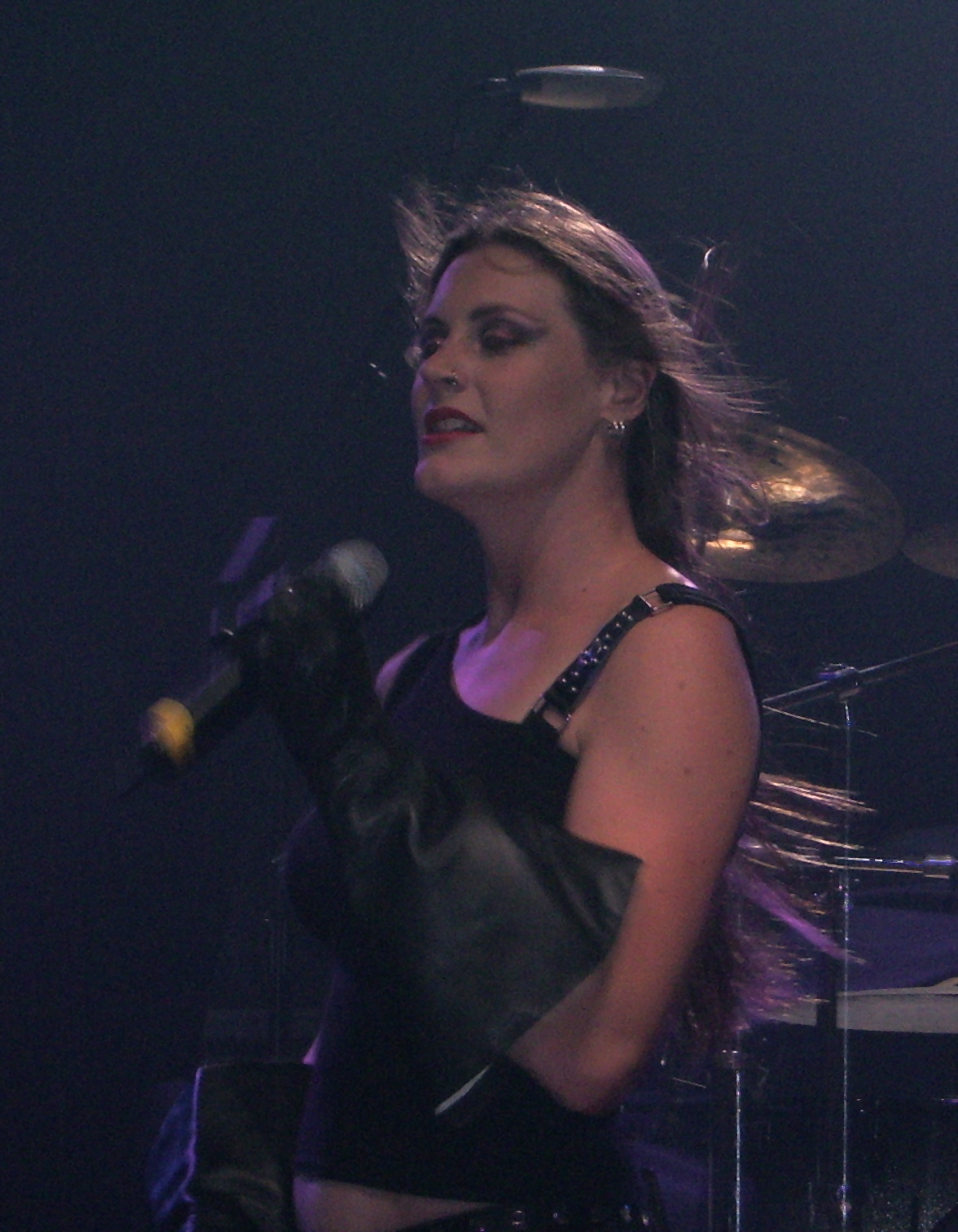
After Forever performing at Bloodstock 2005

Friday 2 September
Main Stage	Battle Metal Stage
HammerFall; Stormwarrior; Metalium; Reckless Tide	Conquest of Steel; Warchild; Deliverance; Zillah

Saturday 3 September
Main Stage	Darwin Stage
Within Temptation; Amon Amarth; After Forever; Bob Catley; Raven; Iron Savior; Suidakra; Season's End; Rise to Addiction	Cathedral; Soliloquy; Balance of Silence; Jesus Fix; Kingsize Blues; Kyrb Grinder ^{†} Dreadnought; Mfkzt; Pro-jekt; Osmium

† Kyrb Grinder were not originally booked to play, but the band members were working at the festival and delays in the running of the Darwin stage left a gap, so they played a short sell to fill in the gap.

=== 2006 ===
2006 was the last year an indoor festival was hosted allowing for full focus on the outdoor festival from then on. Primal Fear headlined day one with My Dying Bride headlining day two and thus being the last ever band to play at Bloodstock as an indoor festival. The full line-up was:

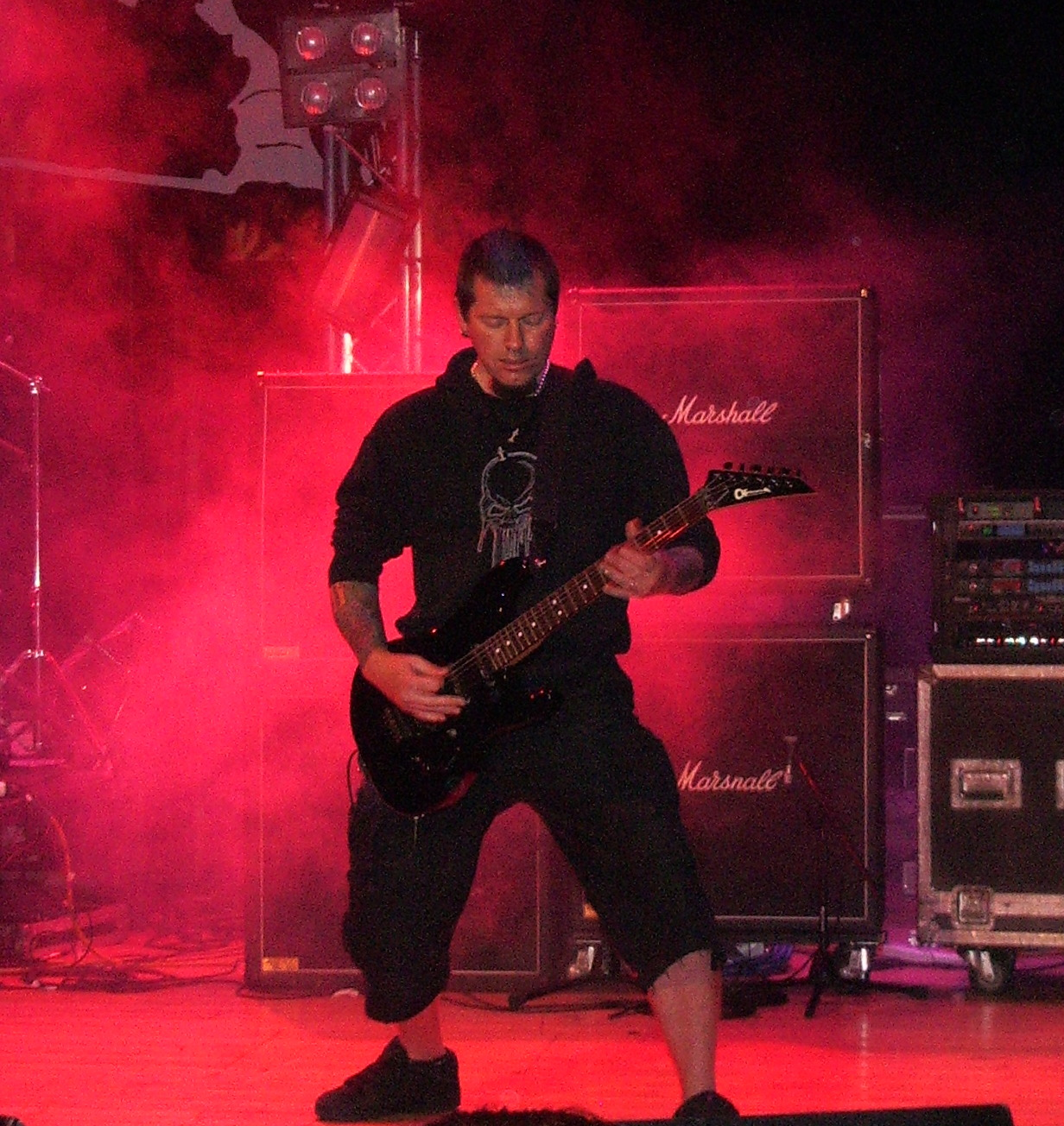
Onslaught performing at Bloodstock in 2006

Friday 29 September
Main Stage	Darwin Stage
Primal Fear; Axel Rudi Pell; Savage Circus; Majesty; Marshall Law	To-Mera; Eden; Steel Tormentor; Captive Audio; Awaken

Saturday 30 September
Main Stage	Darwin Stage
My Dying Bride; Deathstars; Onslaught; Brainstorm; Machine Men; Omnium Gatherum; Sworn Amongst ^{†} Spellblast; Illuminatus	Vanden Plas; Deadfall; Enemy Unknown; Died Smiling; Tourettes Syndrome ^{†} Beyond Afterlife; Agankast; Mael Mórdha; Isaiah; H.O.S.T.I.L.E. The Boy Will Drown

† Tourettes Syndrome had originally been booked to play the main stage. However, their flight was delayed and they did not arrive in time. Sworn Amongst were bumped up from their scheduled Darwin Stage slot to fill the gap, and Tourettes Syndrome played on the Darwin Stage later in the day when they eventually arrived.

== Bloodstock Open Air ==
Bloodstock Open Air is the outdoor venture for the festival after selling out the indoor festival which had a maximum capacity of 2500. Catton Hall was selected as the venue to allow growth in size without losing the festival's established friendly atmosphere and also maintained its link to Derby.

=== 2005 ===
The festival featured only one stage which was headlined by Sebastian Bach (Friday) and Children of Bodom (Saturday).

Main Stage
Friday 24 June	Saturday 25 June
Sebastian Bach; Mostly Autumn; Breed 77; Gotthard; Panic Cell	Children of Bodom; Paradise Lost; Edguy; Masterplan; Evergrey; Humanity; Fourwaykill

=== 2006 ===
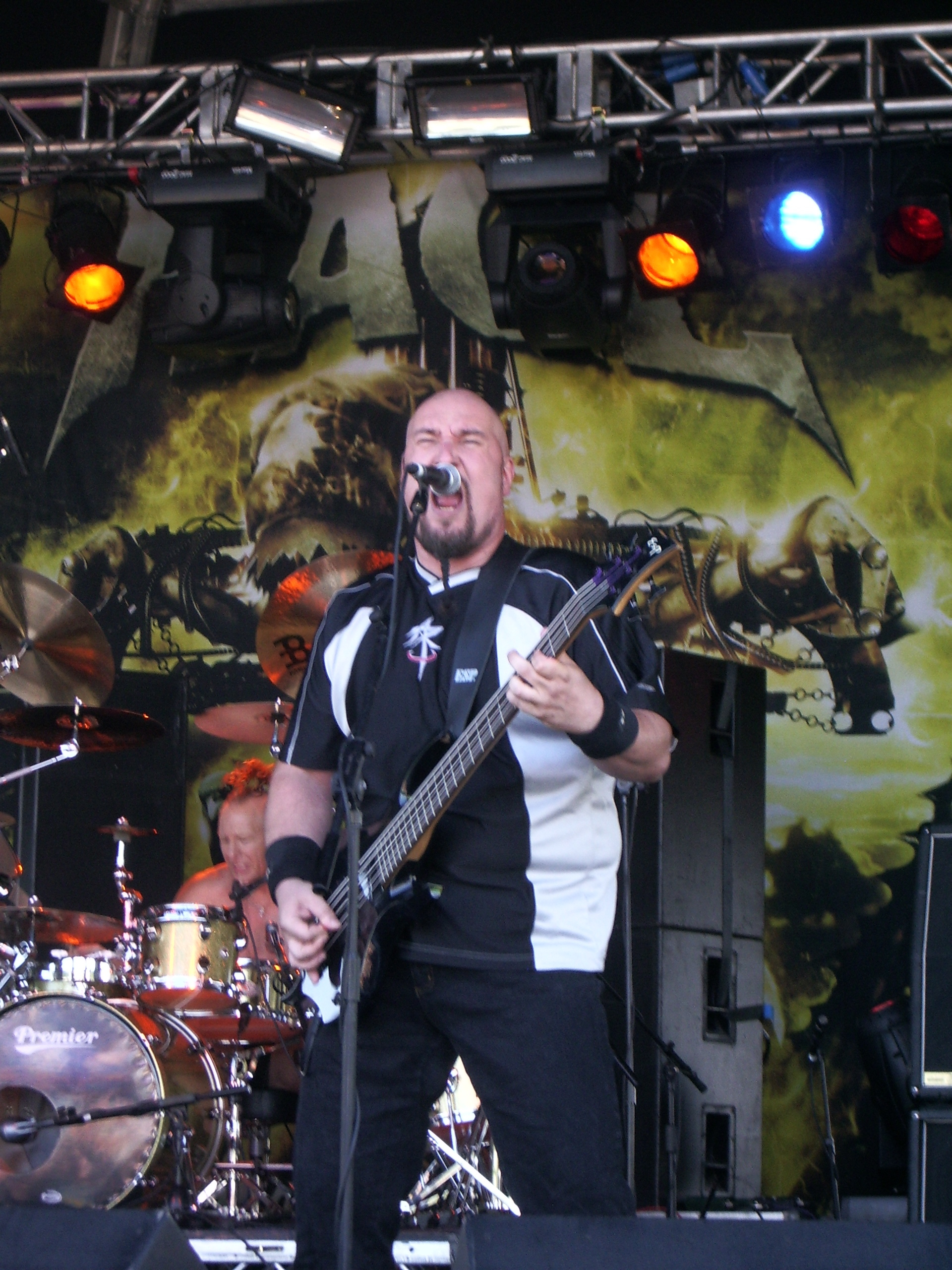
Rage performing at Bloodstock Open Air in 2006

Bloodstock Open Air 2006 brought in a second stage called simply "Unsigned Stage". This was to showcase new unsigned acts to a wider audience like the indoor festival did previously to on their second stage. Now backed by Wacken Open Air, the festival was able to attract more European metal bands to the line-up which was headlined by Edguy (Friday) and Stratovarius (Saturday). It was the last year which had both the indoor and outdoor festivals running together.

Friday 14 July
Main Stage	Unsigned Stage
Edguy; Metal Church; Atheist; Nocturnal Rites; Rage; Pyramaze	Evile; Kingsize Blues; Headless Cross; Pitiful Reign; Nephwrack

Saturday 15 July
Main Stage	Unsigned Stage
Stratovarius; Turisas; Bal-Sagoth; Ensiferum; Callenish Circle; Gorilla Monsoon; Season's End; Ashtar; 19th Century	Deadweight; Sicfelt; State of Serenity; Nekkrosis; Kyrb Grinder; Spitting Blood; Beyond All Reason; Isaiah; Deadeye; Solace; Luna Pin; Phat Jerusalem; Cycle VI; Black River Project

=== 2007 ===
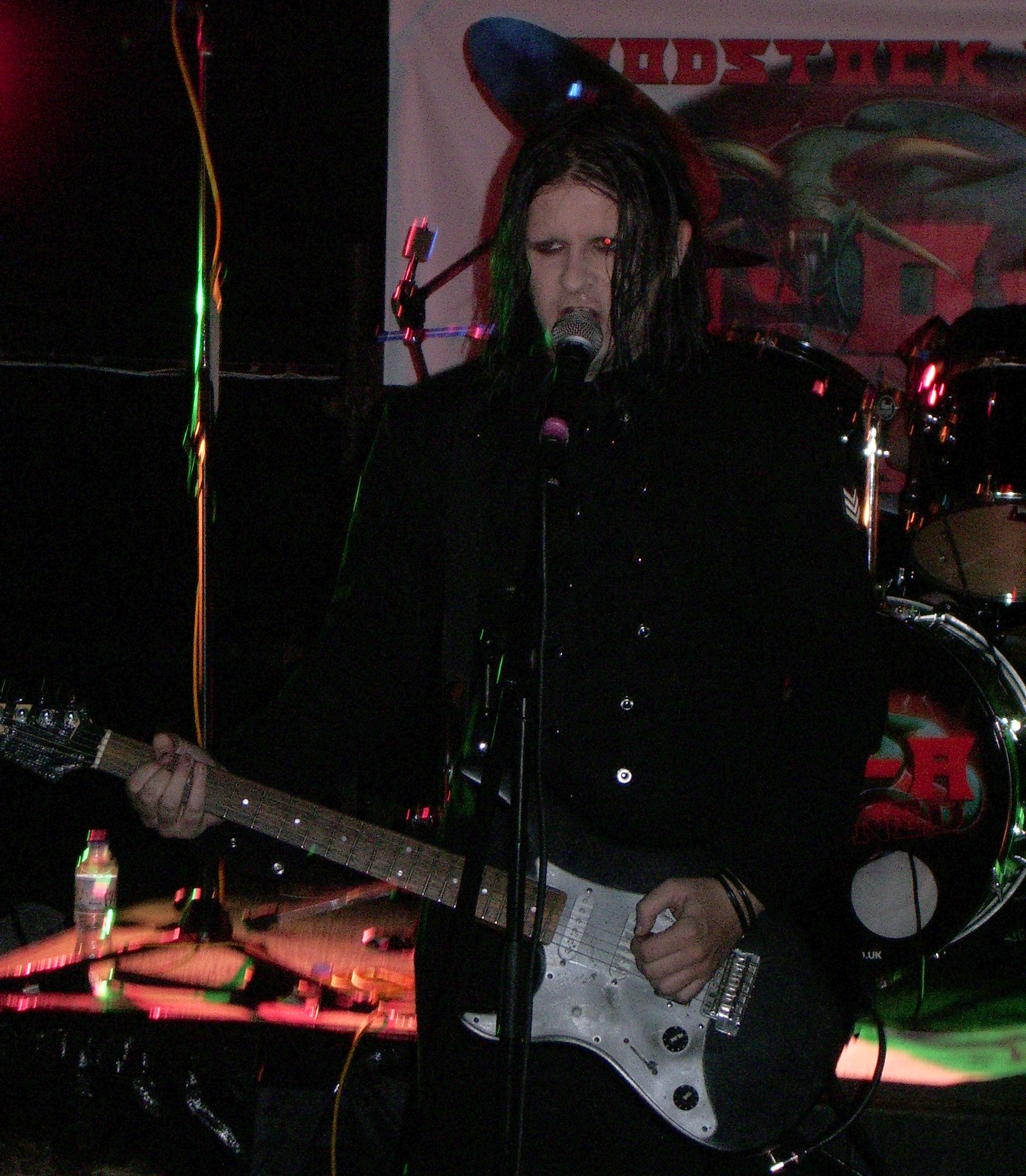
Sinnergod performing at Bloodstock Open Air 2007

Bloodstock Open Air 2007 brought further growth for the festival which now ran over three days and included three stages. The additional stage was named the Lava Stage and allowed more established but smaller acts to perform at the festival. Following a stronger marketing campaign which included advertisement within HMV and greater coverage in music media, attendance at the festival more than doubled from the previous year exceeding 5000 people. The festival's website also went through a major overhaul and the opportunity was given to unsigned bands to upload their videos. Following public voting, Costa Rican band Sight Of Emptiness won and were invited to open the main stage on Thursday. The three mainstage headliners were Testament (Thursday), Lacuna Coil (Friday) and In Flames (Saturday).

BOA 2007 took place from Thursday 16 August to Saturday 18 August. The line up was as follows:

Thursday 16 August
Main Stage	Lava Stage
Testament; Firewind; Head On; Kiuas; Sight of Emptiness; Chris Slade	Beholder

Friday 17 August
Main Stage	Unsigned Stage	Lava
Lacuna Coil; Dark Tranquillity; Nevermore; Epica; Korpiklaani; Memfis; Wolf; Scar Symmetry; Voodoo Six; Exploder	Hexagram; Idiom; King Lizard; Sinocence; Forever Never; Cerebral Fix; Timefall; Enemo J The Aftermath; Life Denied; Omen; Mindflow	Zenith; Blindsight

Saturday 18 August
Main Stage	Unsigned Stage	Lava Stage
In Flames; Arch Enemy; Sabbat; Dream Evil; Finntroll; Legion of the Damned; Benediction; Freedom Call; Rise to Addiction; Beyond All Reason	Terrathorn; Axis of Evil; Exit Ten; Trigger 9 Honey for Christ; Nemhain; Speed Theory; Nephwrack; Sinnergod; The Hollow Earth Theory; The Apostacy; Kobrakai; Hanging Doll	Rollin' Thunder; Headrush

=== 2008 ===
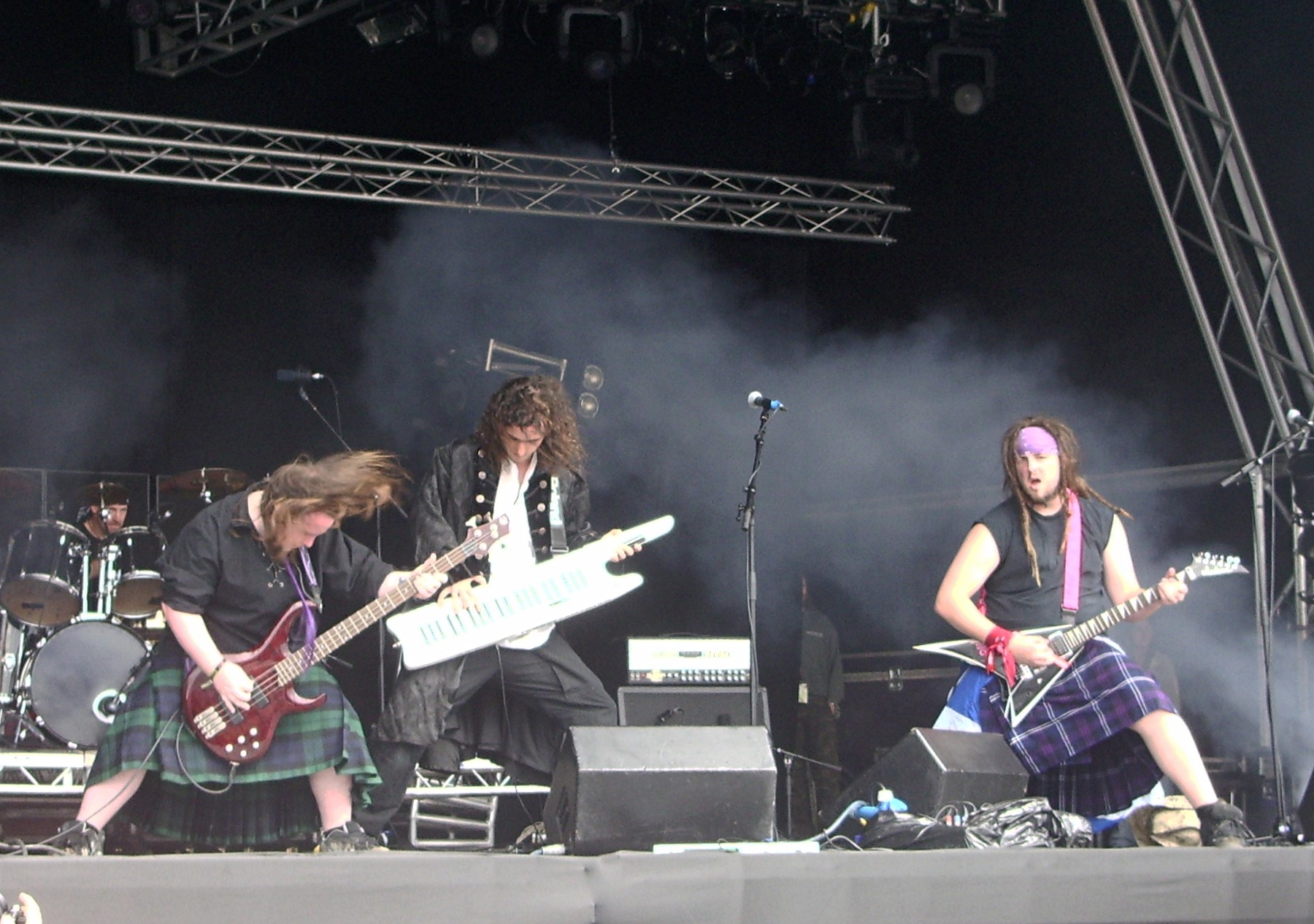
Alestorm performing at Bloodstock Open Air 2008

Bloodstock Open Air 2008 took place from Friday 15 August to Sunday 17 August.

Thursday 14 August
Lava Stage

Conquest of Steel
Bungle Jr

Friday 15 August
Main Stage	Scuzz Stage	Lava Stage
Opeth; Helloween; Soulfly; Primal Fear; Destruction; Akercocke; Týr; Praying Mantis; Evile; Saint Deamon	From the Ashes; Sorcerer's Spell; The Dead Lay Waiting; Anger Management; Firebrand Super Rock; Son of Science; Obsessive Compulsive; Hospital of Death; Broken Faith; A470; Deadfilmstar	The Inbreds; Invasion; Outcryfire; Pro-jekt

Saturday 16 August
Main Stage	Scuzz Stage	Lava Stage
Dimmu Borgir; Iced Earth; Soilwork; Napalm Death; Moonsorrow; Communic; Swallow the Sun; Eluveitie; Rise to Remain; Cloudscape; Evil Scarecrow	The Berzerker; RSJ; Metalloid; Concept of Time; Hellfighter; Keltic Jihad; The Defiled; Blood Island Raiders; The Dirty Youth; Mantra; Empyreal Destroyer; Witchsorrow; Denounce; 9 Days Down	Sondura; Fury UK; Seven Years Dead

Sunday 17 August
Main Stage	Scuzz Stage	Lava Stage
Nightwish; At the Gates; Overkill; As I Lay Dying; Kataklysm; Mob Rules; Grand Magus; Alestorm; Crowning Glory; Heaven's Basement	TesseracT; Silent Descent; Musta Talvi; Ted Maul; Ravens Creed; Necrosadistic Goat Torture; Celtic Legacy; Ravenage; Serotonal; De Profundis; Blasphemous Creation; Cursed as Angels	Liquid Sky; Adam Bomb; Breedapart; Heaven's Gate; Esoterica

=== 2009 ===
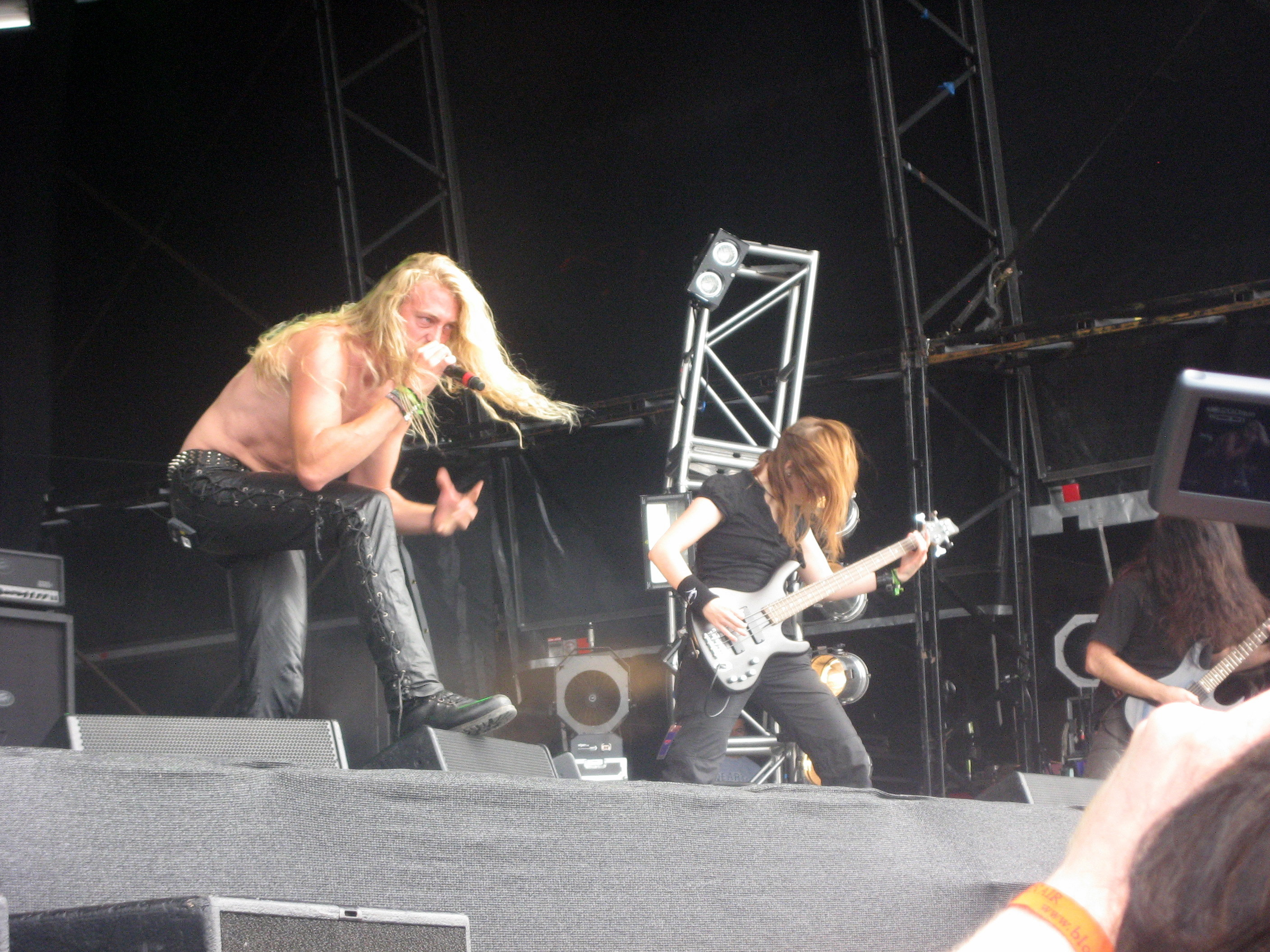
Equilibrium performing at Bloodstock Open Air 2009

Bloodstock Open Air 2009 took place at Catton Hall from Friday 14 August to Sunday 16 August.

Friday 14 August
Main Stage	Unsigned Stage	Sophie Lancaster Stage	Jägermeister Stage
Carcass; Arch Enemy; Saxon; Sodom; Katatonia; Municipal Waste; Die Apokalyptischen Reiter; Insomnium; Million Dollar Reload; Blitzkrieg	Vallenbrosa; The Green River Project; Gods of Hellfire; Blindfolds Aside; Alternative Carpark; Snakebite; Divine Chaos; Left to Bleed; Bloodshot Dawn; Bisonhammer; Ventflow	Pythia; Malefice; Godsized; Xerath	Blitzkrieg

Saturday 15 August
Main Stage	Unsigned Stage	Sophie Lancaster Stage	Jägermeister Stage
Cradle of Filth; Blind Guardian; Apocalyptica; Kreator; Enslaved; Candlemass; Entombed; The Haunted; Wolf; Battlelore; Uncle Rotter	The Saw Doctors; Severed Heaven; Hunted; Solsikk; O.M.T; Inner Eden; Sanctorum; Internal Conflict; Switchblade Scream; Niyah Sky; Nefarious; They Will Rise	The Rotted; Abgott; Arthemis; Celesty	Godsized; Celesty

Sunday 16 August
Main Stage	Unsigned Stage	Sophie Lancaster Stage	Jägermeister Stage
Europe; Satyricon; Amon Amarth; Moonspell; Turisas; Anathema; Equilibrium; Girlschool; Sabaton; Beholder	Nya; Into the Woods; Nightmare World; Biomortal; Sower; Primitive Graven Image; Long Time Dead; Triaxis; Annwn; Agonyst; Eibon la Furies	Eden's Curse; Tribe; Darkness Dynamite; Anterior	Beholder; Into the Woods

=== 2010 ===
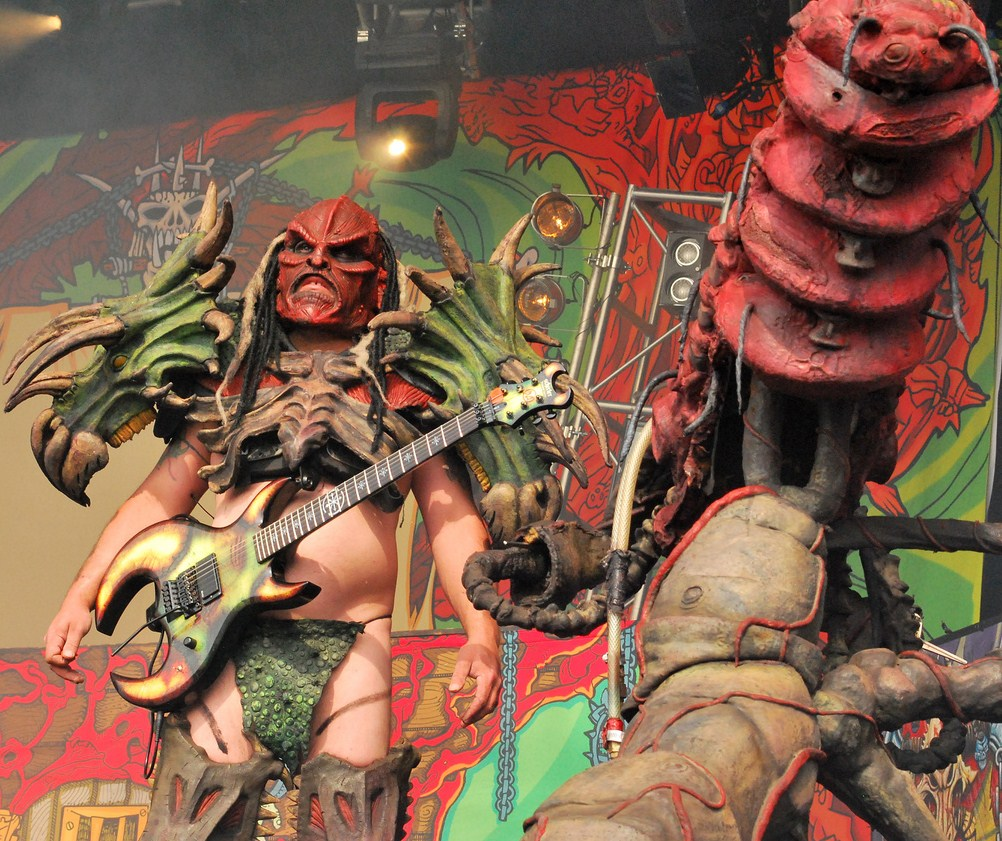
Gwar performing at Bloodstock Open Air 2010

Bloodstock Open Air 2010 celebrated the festival's 10th anniversary, and took place between Friday 13 August and Sunday 15 August. The line up was as follows:

Thursday 12 August
Sophie Lancaster Stage

Desecration
Hospital of Death

Friday 13 August
Ronnie James Dio Stage	New Blood Stage	Sophie Lancaster Stage	Jägermeister Stage
Opeth; Meshuggah; Sonata Arctica; Gorgoroth; Cathedral; Ensiferum; Rage; Ross the Boss; Black Spiders; Snakebite	Arceye; Credit to Dementia; Shrapnel; Splintered Soul; Senturia; Tempestora; Morgue Orgy; Grieve; Betraeus; Lordaeron; Under Blackened Skies	Powerwolf; Enforcer; Steelwing; Collapse	Betraeus; Sworn to Oath; Victor Smolski

Saturday 14 August
Ronnie James Dio Stage	New Blood Stage	Sophie Lancaster Stage	Jägermeister Stage
Children of Bodom; Fear Factory; The Devin Townsend Project; Amorphis; Obituary; Edguy; Onslaught; Evile; Leaves' Eyes; Andromeda	The Whores; Reism; Chaos Asylum; Silas; Flayed Disciple; Aghast; Lithurgy; Zocalo; Achren; Echoes Fall; Burn the Hive	Sylosis; Benediction; Regardless of Me; Mordecai	Silas; Cosmic Vortex of Doom; Hanging Doll; Point Blank Fury

Sunday 15 August
Ronnie James Dio Stage	New Blood Stage	Sophie Lancaster Stage	Jägermeister Stage
Twisted Sister; Cannibal Corpse; Bloodbath; Gojira; Gwar; Korpiklaani; Doro; Holy Moses; Suffocation; Bonded by Blood	Furyon; Core Project; Orestea; Stone Circle; Mutant; Extreme Od; Ishmael; Traces; Hekz; Neonfly; Old Corpse Road	Killing Machine; Winterfylleth; Witchsorrow; The Prophecy; Purified In Blood	Fury UK

- Heaven & Hell were booked to headline on Sunday, but pulled out due to Ronnie James Dio's continuing health issues.
  - Shortly after Heaven & Hell pulled out, Dio died. The main stage was later renamed the Ronnie James Dio stage in tribute to him.
  - Twisted Sister's headline slot was moved from Friday to Sunday to replace Heaven & Hell. Opeth were then booked to fill the Friday headline slot.
- Dream Evil were confirmed for the mainstage on Friday, but were forced to pull out due to "personal commitments".
- Behemoth were confirmed for the mainstage on Friday, but pulled out due to the hospitalisation of frontman, Adam "Nergal" Darski. Cathedral were announced as their replacements.
- The Sophie Lancaster stage was increased in size and became Bloodstock's second stage. It now plays host to larger, more well known bands, as well as DJs, karaoke, film showings, competitions and more.

=== 2011 ===
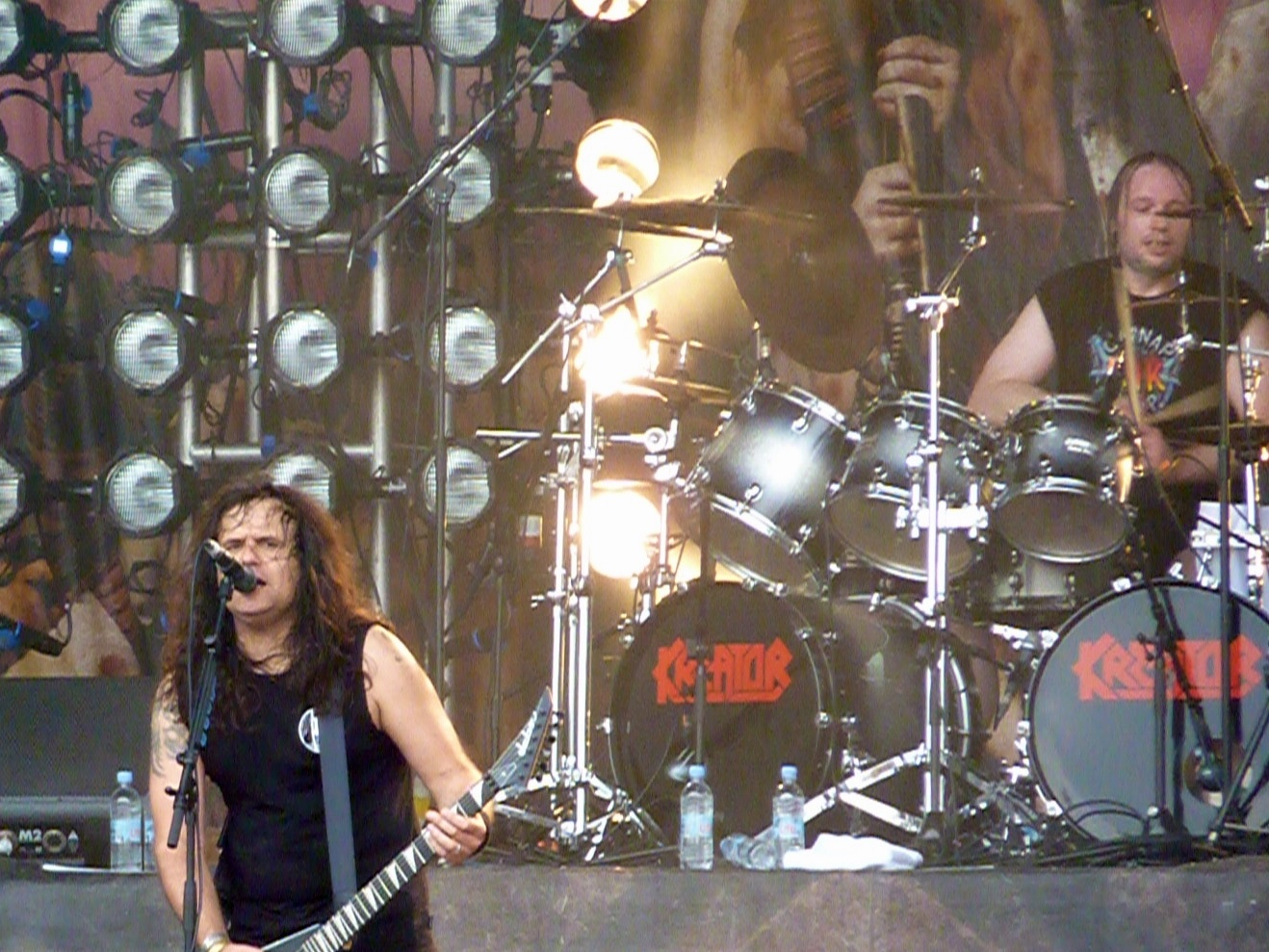
Kreator performing at Bloodstock Open Air 2011

Bloodstock Open Air 2011 took place at Catton Hall between Friday 12 August and Sunday 14 August 2011. This year the festival had over 10,900 visitors.

Thursday 11 August
Sophie Lancaster Stage

Steve Hughes
Jason Rouse
Beholder
Revoker
Xerath
Achren

Friday 12 August
Ronnie James Dio Stage	Sophie Lancaster Stage	New Blood Stage	Jägermeister Stage
W.A.S.P. The Devin Townsend Project; Kreator; Coroner; Triptykon; Poisonblack; Forbidden; Wolf; The Defiled	Lawnmower Deth; October File; Byfrost; Arthemis; Romeo Must Die; Cerebral Bore; Imicus; Mortad	Brezno; Training Icarus; Cryostorm; Decimation; The Furious Horde; Saturnian; Rannoch; Primitai; Entro-P; Inner Fire; Shreddertron; Unknown Fear	Primitai; Alternative Carpark; Rannoch; Spires; Foul Body Autopsy

Saturday 13 August
Ronnie James Dio Stage	Sophie Lancaster Stage	New Blood Stage	Jägermeister Stage
Immortal; Rhapsody of Fire; Therion; Wintersun; Ihsahn; Finntroll; Tarot; Grave Digger; Skeletonwitch	Keith Platt; Stephen Hill; Angel Witch; The Rotted; Deadly Circus Fire; Hammer of the Gods; Def-Con-One; Blake; Dripback	Intensive Square; Haerken; Pure Negative; Hostile Rising; Furyborn; Foul Body Autopsy; Impaled Existence; Uburen; Bury the Conscious; Soulsphere; Zombie Militia; Bludvera	Northern Oak; Obsessive Compulsive; Guardians of Andromeda; Fantasist; Avenge Thee + Naime

Sunday 14 August
Ronnie James Dio Stage	Sophie Lancaster Stage	New Blood Stage	Jägermeister Stage
Motörhead; Morbid Angel; At the Gates; Exodus; HammerFall; Napalm Death; Primordial; 1349; Hell	Steve Hughes; Jason Rouse; Criminal; Amaranthe; Power Quest; Survivors Zero; Hellish Outcast; Nemhain; Evil Scarecrow; Grand Ultra	Lifer; Achilla; Talanas; Northern Oak; Sanguine; Twilight's Embrace; Sacred Illusion; Akarusa Yami; Spires; Visitor; Wolfcrusher; Candid Iniquity	The Last in Line; Pig Iron; Inferno; Operation Error; Amaranthe

- Nevermore were booked for the Ronnie James Dio stage, but were removed from the official line up in July. No official explanation was released.
- Primevil were booked for the Sophie stage, but were later removed from the official line up. No explanation was released.

=== 2012 ===
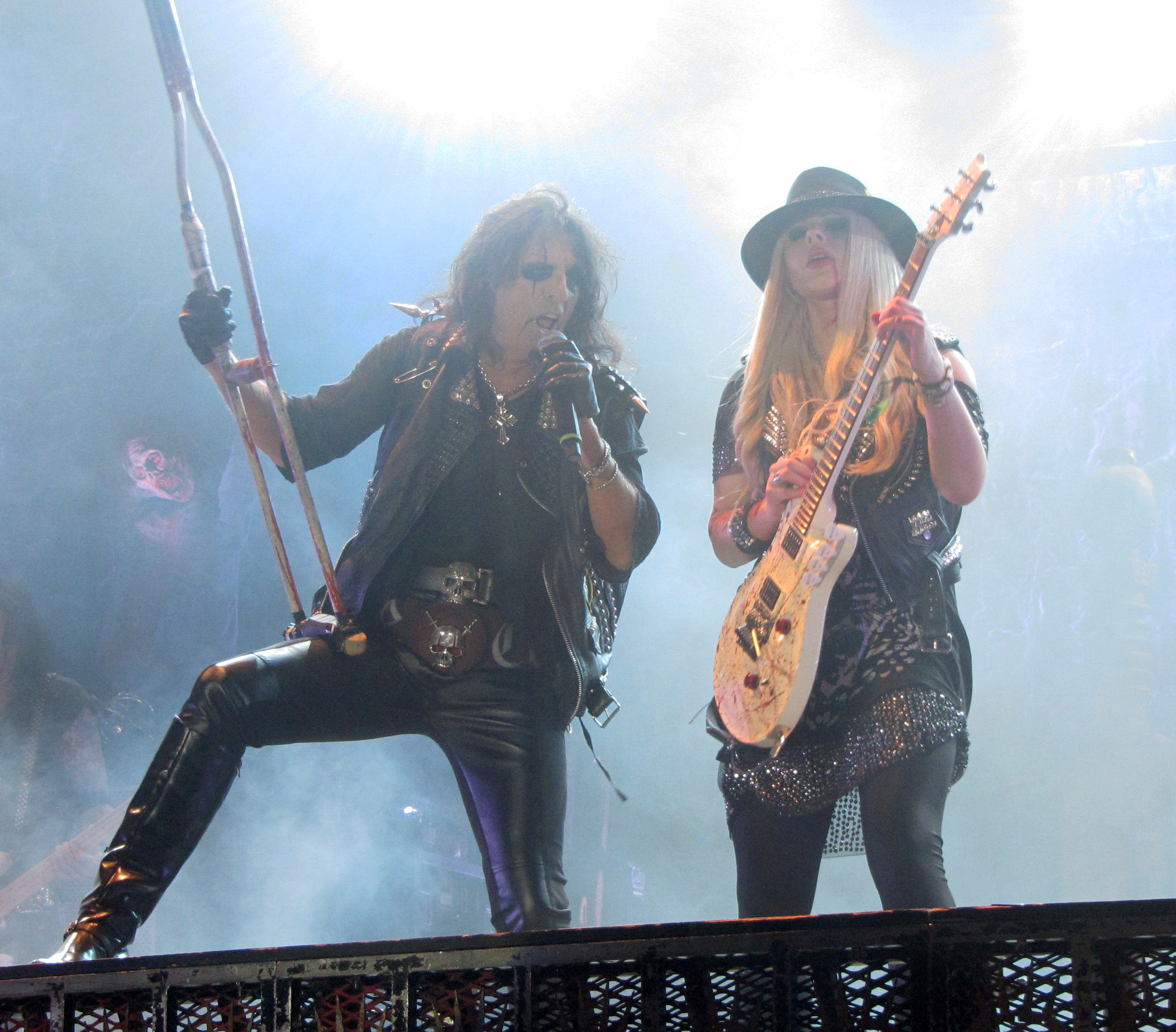
Alice Cooper performing at Bloodstock Open Air in 2012

Bloodstock Open Air 2012 was scheduled to take place at Catton Hall between Thursday 16 August and Sunday 19 August 2012 (a week later than usual, owing to the festival organisers not wanting the festival to clash with the closing of the 2012 London Olympics); however, the dates were changed to between Thursday 9 August and Sunday 12 August. This change was never officially explained.

Thursday 9 August
Sophie Lancaster Stage

Viking Skull
Marionette
Bloodshot Dawn
Saturnian

Friday 10 August
Ronnie James Dio Stage	Sophie Lancaster Stage	New Blood Stage	Jägermeister Stage
Behemoth; Dio Disciples; Watain; Sepultura; Iced Earth; Moonsorrow; Grand Magus; Freedom Call; Malefice	Dirty Sanchez; Alcest; Eastern Front; Pythia; Death Valley Knights; Derision; Sweet Savage; Primitai; Gonoreas; Commander in Chief	Fallen Fate; Infernal Creation; Kataleptic; Scare Tactics; Killer Hurts; Exile the Traitor; My Wooden Pillow; Cambion; Krepuskul; Warhorse; Waking Theo; Control the Storm; InComa	Absolva; Dave McPherson; Andraste; Dakesis; Skarlett Riot

Saturday 11 August
Ronnie James Dio Stage	Sophie Lancaster Stage	New Blood Stage	Jägermeister Stage
Machine Head; Testament; Hatebreed; Sanctuary; Mayhem; Crowbar; Chthonic; I AM I Benediction	Orange Goblin; Sight of Emptiness; Witchsorrow; Winterfylleth; Furyon; Rising Dream; Infernal Tenebra; Dripback; Savage Messiah; Splintered Soul	Gone Til Winter; Doomed; Reflection in Exile; Cosmic Vortex of Doom; Tempus Fusion; Bull Riff Stampede; Wretched Soul; Sublime Eyes; Father; The Conflict Within; Stormborn; Merciless Fail; Apollyon	I AM I Dreamcatcher; Kyrbgrinder; Triaxis; From Ruin

Sunday 12 August
Ronnie James Dio Stage	Sophie Lancaster Stage	New Blood Stage	Jägermeister Stage
Alice Cooper; Dimmu Borgir; Paradise Lost; Anvil; Evile; The Black Dahlia Murder; Nile; Corrosion of Conformity; Kobra and the Lotus	Anaal Nathrakh; Headcharger; Demonic Resurrection; Nociferia; Ancient Ascendant; Crimes of Passion; Battalion; Flayed Disciple; Re-Armed	Airstryke; Blynd; Incinery; Shattered Skies; A Thousand Enemies; Huron; Reign of Fury; Dreamcatcher; Hakin; Sa-da-kO; Aethara; From Ruin; Seprevation	The Mercy House; Kobra and the Lotus; Orianthi; Splintered Soul; A Thousand Enemies

- Lock Up were booked to play on the RJD stage on the Friday, but were removed from the lineup. This was later confirmed on the official Bloodstock Twitter page due to logistical problems.
- Deicide were booked to play on the RJD stage on the Sunday, but ended up cancelling the whole European tour that BOA was a part of. Because of this Evile were moved from the Sophie Lancaster Stage to the Ronnie James Dio Stage to fill the void.
- Anthrax were announced for BOA 2013 before Machine Head's Headline set

=== 2013 ===
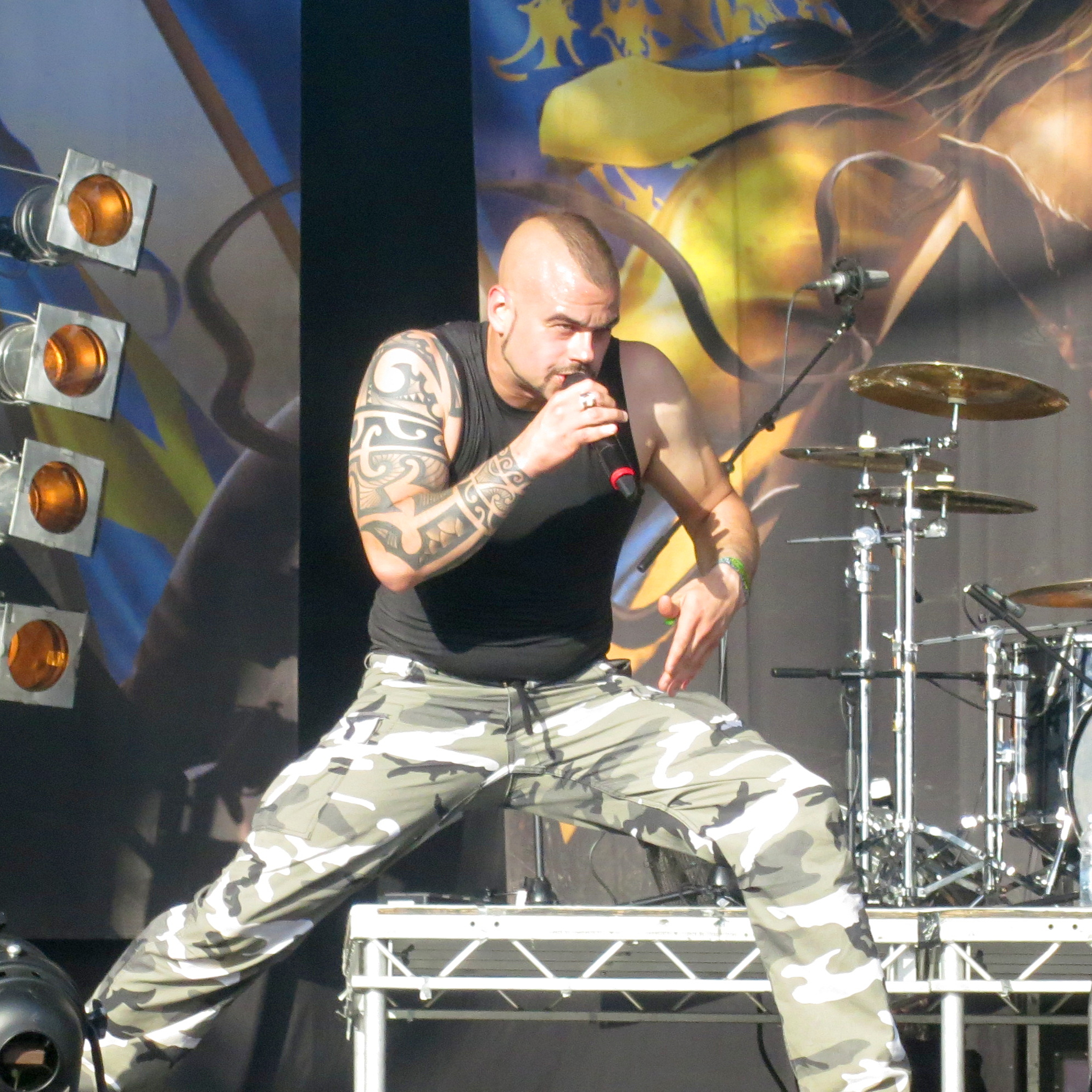
Sabaton performing at Bloodstock Open Air 2013

Bloodstock Open Air 2013 took place at Catton Hall between Thursday 8 August and Sunday 11 August.

Thursday 8 August
Sophie Lancaster stage

Tragedy
Ravenage
OAF
Bull-Riff Stampede
Motherload

Friday 9 August
Ronnie James Dio stage	Sophie Lancaster stage	New Blood Stage	Jägermeister Stage
King Diamond; Accept; Voivod; Municipal Waste; Dark Funeral; Firewind; Ex Deo; Death Angel; Earthtone9	Scar Symmetry; Xentrix; Xerath; Cypher 16; Skiltron; The Prophecy; Shrapnel; Bloodbound; Absolva; The Way of Purity	Mair; Craniation; Fahran; Second Rate Angels; Karybdis; Prosperina; Nocturna; Warpath; Left Unscarred; Shoel Afterlife; Rezinwolf; Cruel Humanity; This Is Turin	Mitchel Emms; Ravenage; Wraith; Mia Klose; Resin

Saturday 10 August
Ronnie James Dio stage	Sophie Lancaster stage	New Blood Stage	Jägermeister Stage
Lamb of God; Avantasia; Sabaton; Gojira; Kataklysm; Hell; 3 Inches of Blood; Beholder; Stormbringer	Last In Line; Power Quest*; NeonFly; Mael Mordha; Scarab; Betraeus; Vanderbuyst; Sworn Amongst; Unfathomable Ruination	The Infernal Sea; Skreamer; One for Sorrow; Dishonour the Crown; Ten Cent Toy; Internal Conflict; In the Hills; Gehtika; XII Boar; Diesel King; Mask of Judas; Elithia; Fallen Riot	Incassum; Awake By Design; The Earls of Mars; Ballsdeep; Cavorts

Sunday 11 August
Ronnie James Dio stage	Sophie Lancaster stage	New Blood Stage	Jägermeister Stage
Slayer; Anthrax; DevilDriver; Exodus; Amorphis; Fozzy; Sacred Mother Tongue; Whitechapel; Gama Bomb	Dying Fetus; Wolfsbane; Belphegor; Breed 77; Gormathon; Evil Scarecrow; Bossk; RSJ; Grifter; States of Panic; Lifer	Bludger; Amulet; Merciless Terror; Bound By Exile; Negligence; Eridium; Fury; Line of Fire; NeonHalo; Kremated; Oceanis; Scar City; Black Emerald	Phil Campbell's All Starr Band; Betraeus; Andy James; The Bastard Sons; Operation Error

Pritchard vs Dainton, Andrew O'Neill & Full Contact Medieval Tournament Combat also appeared at the festival.

*Power Quest's final show before disbanding.

=== 2014 ===
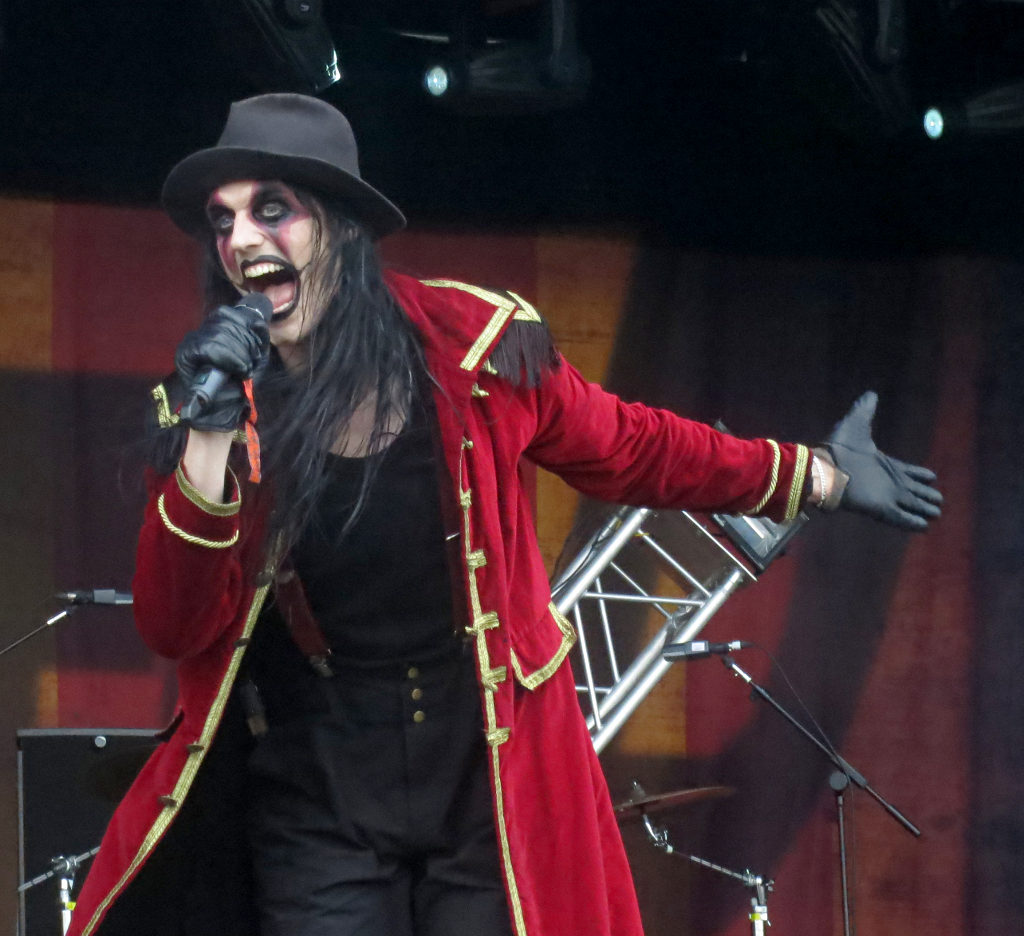
Avatar performing at Bloodstock Open Air 2014

Bloodstock Open Air 2014 took place at Catton Hall between Thursday 7 August and Sunday 10 August.

The line-up was:

Ronnie James Dio Stage
Friday	Saturday	Sunday
Down; Dimmu Borgir; Hatebreed; Triptykon; Prong; Flotsam and Jetsam; Primordial; Entombed A.D. Bloodshot Dawn	Emperor; Carcass; Children of Bodom; Lacuna Coil; Crowbar; Orphaned Land; Decapitated; Shining; Evil Scarecrow	Megadeth; Amon Amarth; Saxon; Obituary; Avatar; Biohazard; ReVamp; Aborted; Arthemis

Sophie Lancaster Stage
Thursday	Friday	Saturday	Sunday
Jaldaboath; Monument; Incinery; Gehtika; Ballsdeep	Rotting Christ; Skyclad; Diabolical; Winterfylleth; Deals Death; Zerozonic; De Profundis; Krokodil; Aghast! Cambion; Gurt	Hellyeah; Sister Sin; Battleaxe; Blood Red Throne; Obsidian Kingdom; Conquest of Steel; The Mercy House; Old Corpse Road; Profane Omen; The King Is Blind; Babylon Fire	Satan; Graveyard; Collibus; Krow; Stormzone; Stahlsarg; Voices; Morgue Orgy; Haerken; October File; Aaron Keylock

New Blood Stage
Friday	Saturday	Sunday
Jackknife Seizure; Jonestown; Angerman; Dog Tired; Hogslayer; Sinpathetic; Alone with Wolves; Oakhaart; Brutai; Abhorrent Decimation; No Sin Evades His Gaze; Convincing Clearity; Goat Leaf	All Consumed; Cacodaemonic; Warcrab; The Canyon Observer; Phantom; Metaprism; Resin; Born of the Jackal; Synaptik; The Threat; Darkeye; Reprisal; Back Down or Die	The Self Titled; Once Upon; Kill All the Gentlemen; Scordatura; Stoneghost; Today the Sun Dies; Psykosis; Leatherneck; Akbal; Eradikator; Unseen Prophecy; King Goat; Byzanthian Neckbeard

Jägermeister Stage
Friday	Saturday	Sunday
Aceldama; King Creature; Undersmile; Ten Foot Wizard; Cadence Noir	Alzir; Orphaned Land Acoustic; Massive Wagons; The Darkhorse; The Amorettes	enkElination; Ded Orse; The Heretic Order; Rabid Bitch of the North; Resin Acoustic

Prior to Lamb Of God's set at Bloodstock 2013, Emperor were announced for the 2014 event.
Phil Campbell's All Starr Band were booked to headline Thursday on the Sophie stage but withdrew 2 weeks before the festival due to Phil's Motörhead commitments.
Due to Graveyard's flight being delayed, Graveyard and Avatar swapped slots at last minute.

=== 2015 ===
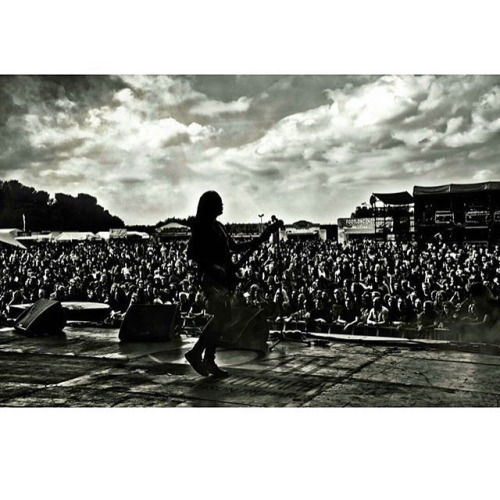
Savage Messiah performing at Bloodstock Open Air 2015

Bloodstock Open Air 2015 took place at Catton Hall between Thursday 6 August and Sunday 9 August.

The lineup was:

Ronnie James Dio Stage
Friday	Saturday	Sunday
Trivium; Sabaton; Overkill; Ihsahn; Enslaved; Belphegor; Armored Saint; Raging Speedhorn; Nuclear Assault	Within Temptation; Opeth; Death DTA; Dark Angel; Napalm Death; Korpiklaani; 1349; Xerath; Savage Messiah	Rob Zombie; Black Label Society; Cannibal Corpse; Ensiferum; Sepultura; Pro-Pain; Orange Goblin; Wolf; Agalloch

Sophie Lancaster Stage
Thursday	Friday	Saturday	Sunday
ArnoCorps; Red Rum; Desecration; Metaprism; Reign of Fury	Delain; Conan; I AM I Hang the Bastard; Fire Red Empress; Ne Obliviscaris; Re-Animator; Messiah's Kiss; Bast; Oaf; Silas	Fleshgod Apocalypse; Jettblack; Planet of Zeus; Burgerkill; Mordred; Battalion; Godsized; Jasad; Ethereal; Ageless Oblivion; Anihilated; Pist	Godflesh; Onslaught; Trepalium; Lawnmower Deth; Destrage; Saille; Ol Drake; Alunah; Villainy; Dead Label; The Izuna Drop; Triaxis

Hobgoblin New Blood Stage
Friday	Saturday	Sunday
Hexis; Piss Viper; Diatessaron; Blackened Ritual; King Leviathan; Forgotten Remains; Countless Skies; We Are the Catalyst; Mutagenocide; XVII; Kryocell; Loft; Mortishead	Victorian Whore Dogs; Sumer; From Eden to Exile; Akarusa Yami; Bloodyard; Codex Alimentarius; Soulborn; Martyr De Mona; Chaos Trigger; Mastiff; Overoth; Deified; Amethyst	Wretched Toad; Burden of the Noose; Scarred; Left for Red; By Any Means; Taken By the Tide; Animator; Obey; Spirytus; Incipit; Tombstone Crow; Hell's Gazelles; Skarthia

Jägermeister Stage
Friday	Saturday	Sunday
Witch Tripper; City of Thieves; The Parallax Method; The Mighty Wraith; Winter Storm; Foul Body Autopsy	Hanowar; Morass of Molasses; Knock Out Kaine; Circle Spectre Haunting; Pig Iron; Divine Solace	Hell Puppets; Snowblind; Blind Haze; Endeavour; Bigfoot; Killer Hurts

VIP Bar Stage
Friday	Saturday	Sunday
		Ozzbourne again

The sideshow Pritchard vs Dainton also appeared at the festival. The historical battle re-enactment group Battle of the Nations UK have been confirmed.

After Sabaton's set, Venom were announced for the 2016 festival. Also, on the Sunday, Behemoth were announced for BOA 2016 as well.

=== 2016 ===
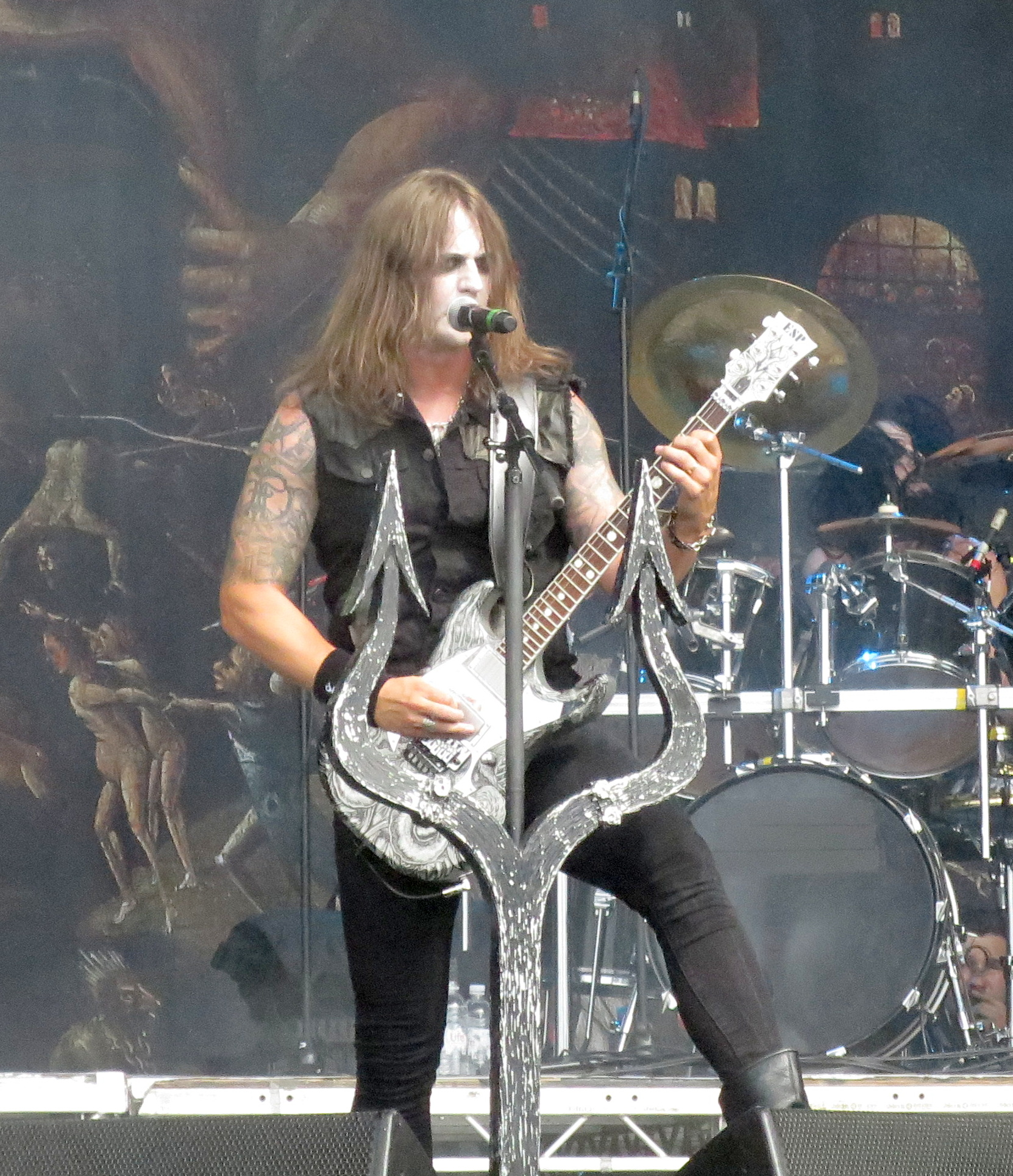
Satyricon performing at Bloodstock Open Air in 2016

BOA 2016 took place at Catton Hall between Thursday 11 and Sunday 14 August 2016.

The lineup was:

Ronnie James Dio Stage
Friday	Saturday	Sunday
Twisted Sister; Behemoth; Venom; Corrosion of Conformity; Misery Loves Co. Stuck Mojo; Evil Scarecrow; Gloryhammer; Hark	Mastodon; Gojira; Paradise Lost; Fear Factory; Rotting Christ; Akercocke; Vallenfyre; Kill II This; Cambion	Slayer; Anthrax; Symphony X DragonForce; Satyricon; Metal Allegiance; Unearth; Heart of a Coward; Ghost Bath

Sophie Lancaster Stage
Thursday	Friday	Saturday	Sunday
Phil Campbell's All Starr Band; Psykosis; Sumer; Karybdis; Sublime Eyes	Diamond Head; Beyond the Black; Beholder; XII Boar; Foetal Juice; The Charm the Fury; Meta-Stasis; Anti-Clone; Brutai; Boss Keloid; Fury	Acid Reign; Shining; Bull-Riff Stampede; One Machine; Misanthrope; Vodun; The King Is Blind; This Is Turin; The Raven Age; Mage; The Heretic Order	Goatwhore; Pythia; Memoriam; Vektor; Whispered; Derange; Witchsorrow; Divine Chaos; Krysthla; Sanguine; Desert Storm

Hobgoblin New Blood Stage
Friday	Saturday	Sunday
Exhumation; Agrona; The Crawling; Triverse Massacre; End of Salvation; Burning the Dream; Vehement; Garganjua; Husk; Seed of Sorrow; Souls of Jack Ketch; Redeye Revival; Witch Tripper	Poseidon; The Face of Ruin; Regulus; Mordrake; After The Abduction; Conjurer; Famyne; Ramage Inc; Vendetta; Heriot; Ten Ton Slug; Bearfist; Black Ink Sun	Gutlocker; Footprints in the Custard; Valous; Chronicles; The John Doe's Burial; Firebomb; Rabid Bitch of the North; Art of Deception; I Saw the World Burn; Far from History; Kahtet; Pteroglyph; Visions of Disfigurement

Jägermeister Stage
Friday	Saturday	Sunday
Two Tales of Woe; Vrona; Fuelled Hate; Chasing Dragons; The Hyena Kill; Isarnos	Vicious Nature; Vice; Broken; Zlatanera; Pulverise; Cybernetic Witch Cult	Attica Rage; Dirty King; Sodomized Cadaver; Aklash; Outright Resistance; Jukebox Monkey

=== 2017 ===
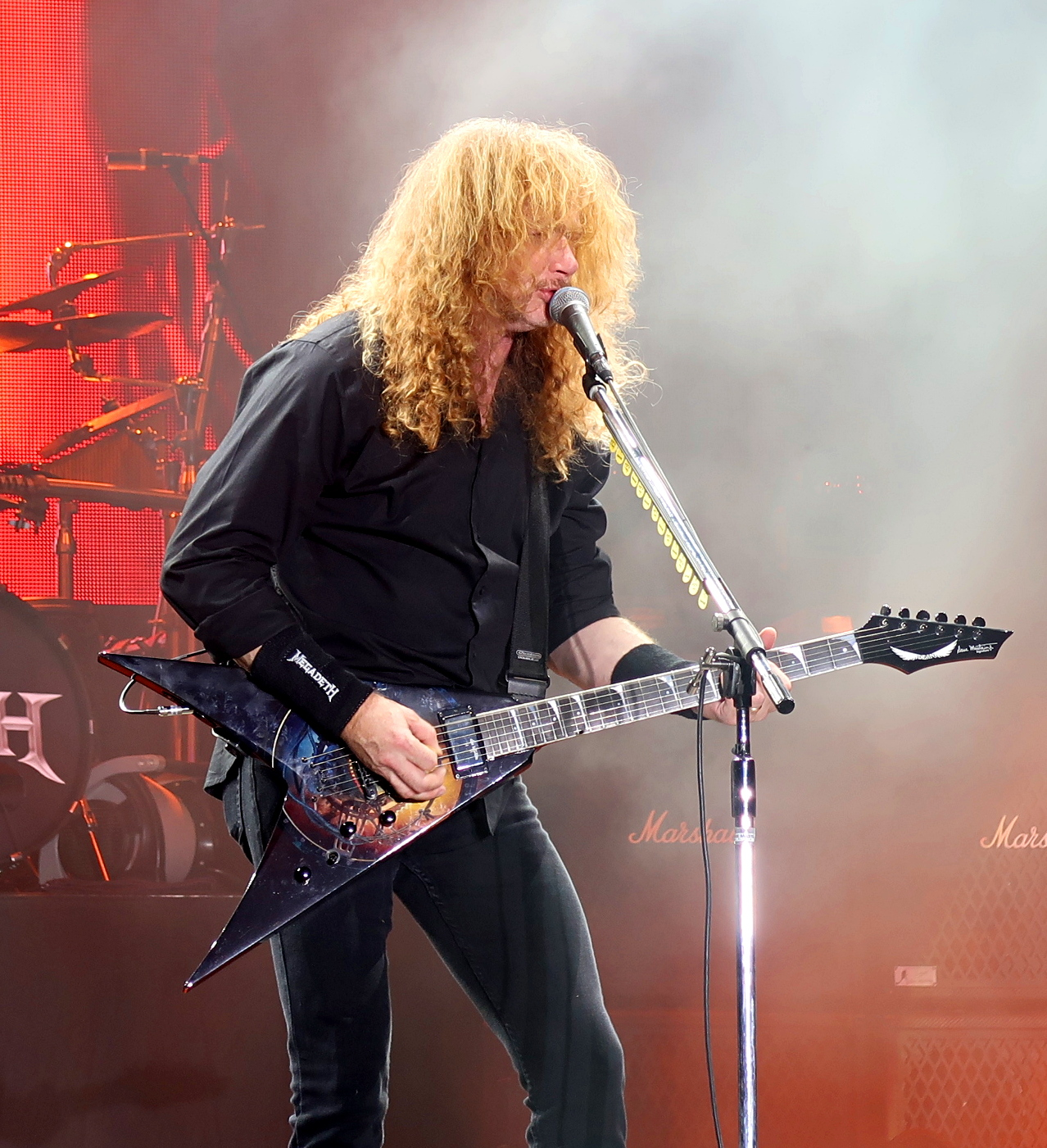
Megadeth performing at Bloodstock Open Air in 2017

BOA 2017 took place at Catton Hall between Thursday 10 and Sunday 13 August 2017.

The lineup was:

Ronnie James Dio Stage
Friday	Saturday	Sunday
Amon Amarth; Blind Guardian; Testament; Decapitated; Soilwork; Devilment; Whitechapel; Chelsea Grin; Forever Still	Ghost; Kreator; Hatebreed; Municipal Waste; Annihilator; King 810; Havok; Winterfylleth; Fallujah	Megadeth; Arch Enemy; Skindred; Hell; Brujeria; Obituary; Possessed; Venom Prison; Broken Teeth

Sophie Lancaster Stage
Thursday	Friday	Saturday	Sunday
Battle Beast; Wind Rose; The Infernal Sea; Gurt; Ramage Inc	Inquisition; Lionize; Shrapnel; Black Moth; Season's End; Dendera; Morass of Molasses; Corpsing; Endeavour; Internal Conflict; Iron Rat	Macabre; Xentrix; OHHMS; Red Rum; Florence Black; GODS; Abhorrent Decimation; The One Hundred; Kroh; Eradikator; Blind River	Wintersun; Bossk; Arthemis; Criminal; ONI; Wolfheart; Puppy; Courtesans; Wretched Soul; Blind Haze; GraVil

Hobgoblin New Blood Stage
Friday	Saturday	Sunday
Nordjevel; Mantra; Blood Oath; Enslavement; Seek Solace in Ruin; Devil's Playground; Raze the Void; Blood Thread; Ashen Crown; Thuum; Embodiment; K-Lacura; Merithian	Dakesis zhOra; Decrepit Monolith; Hoofknuckle; Malum Sky; Ba'al; Solar Sons; Infected Dead; Raised By Owls; Titan Breed; Reaper; Hundred Year Old Man; Ward XVI	Blaakyum; Vorbid; Mist; Na Cruithne; Netherall; Prognosis; Shrouded; Sentience; Torqued; Heathen Deity; Seething Akira; Battalions; Switchblade City

Jägermeister Stage
Friday	Saturday	Sunday
Hanowar; Biggus Riffus; Trendkill; Hung Daddy; Electric Mother	Departed; Twisted Illusion; Tales of Autumn; Bangover; SpyderByte	Voodoo Blood; Unitra; Silverchild; Atragon; Everest Queen

VIP Bar Stage
Friday	Saturday	Sunday
Darth Elvis and the Imperials; Manidu	Steak; Noisepicker	Black Shot Rose; Orphan Gears

=== 2018 ===
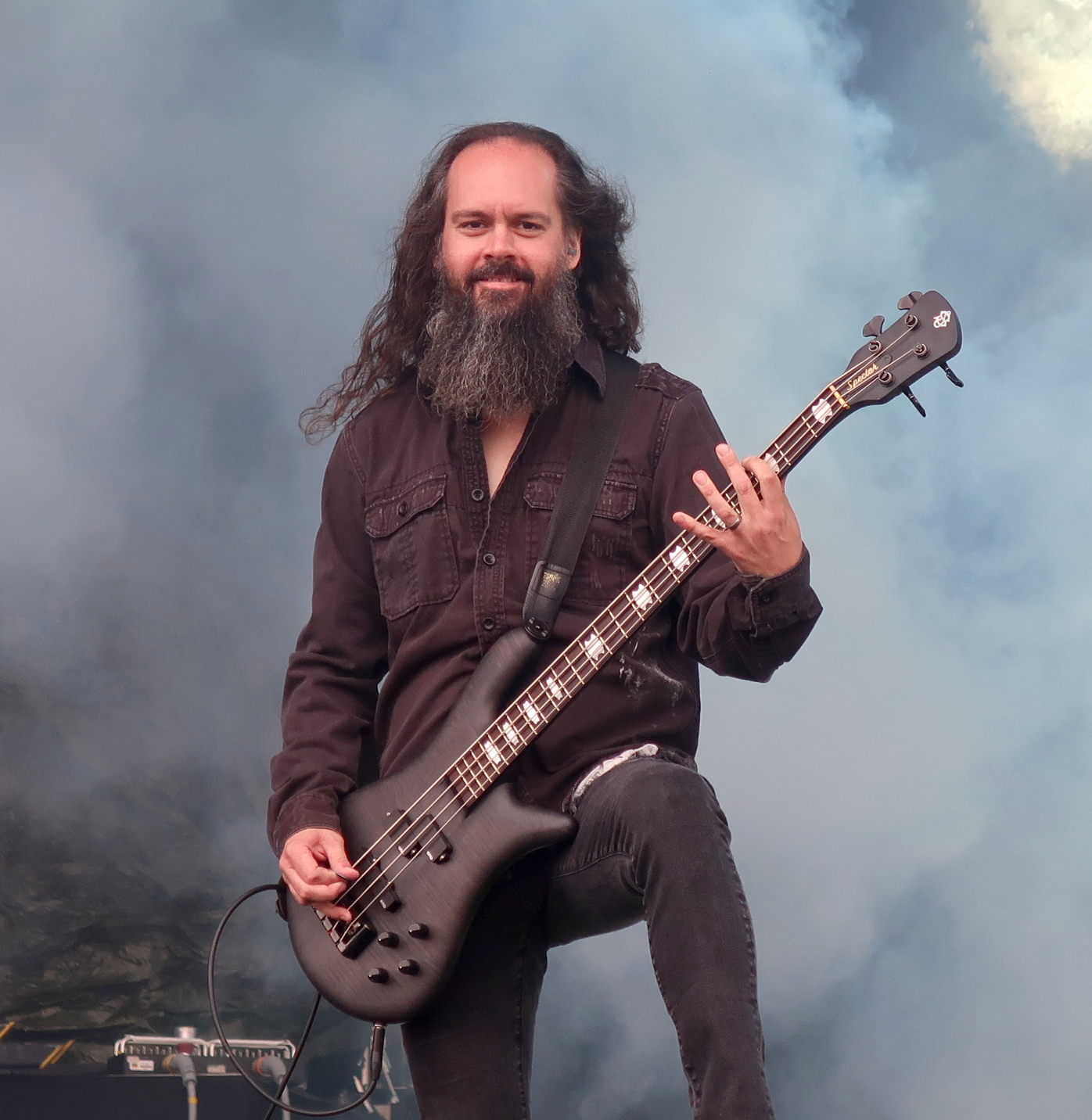
Evergrey performing at Bloodstock Open Air in 2018

BOA 2018 took place at Catton Hall between Thursday 9 August and Sunday 12 August 2018.

The lineup was:

Ronnie James Dio Stage
Friday	Saturday	Sunday
Judas Priest; Emperor; Kamelot; Lovebites; Bloodbath; Wednesday 13; Memoriam; Onslaught; Feed the Rhino	Gojira; Cannibal Corpse; Alestorm; Combichrist; Venom Inc. Septicflesh; Orden Ogan; Power Trip; Nailed to Obscurity	Nightwish; At the Gates; DevilDriver; Mr. Big; Jasta; Fozzy; Amaranthe; Evergrey; Monument

Sophie Lancaster Stage
Thursday	Friday	Saturday	Sunday
Arkona; Bloodshot Dawn; Skiltron; Fire Red Empress; Hundred Year Old Man	Doro; Bleed From Within; Suicidal Tendencies; Ingested; De Profundis; Reprisal; Sodomized Cadaver; Godthrymm; Fahran; Mortishead; Deity's Muse	Orphaned Land; Exhorder; With the Dead; Voyager; A Forest of Stars; Vola; Conjurer; Dead Label; Weight of the Tide; Limb; Forgotten Remains	Watain; Pallbearer; Act of Defiance; Mantar; Demonic Resurrection; Underside; Sangre; Alien Weaponry; King Leviathan; Uncured; Doomsday Outlaw

Hobgoblin New Blood Stage
Friday	Saturday	Sunday
King Bison; Trivax; Body Harvest; Sertraline; Underdark; A Ritual Spirit; Seven Hells; Kinasis; Pelugion; Vulgore; Democratus; Garshkott; Turbyne	Earthbound; Luna's Call; Psychotype; Valafar; Aonia; Equinox; Oracle; 13; Negative Thought Process; Ashborn; Cadence Noir; Kilonova; The Brood	Srd; Servers; Sellsword; Skybrudd; Dead Before Mourning; Barbarian Hermit; This Place Hell; Obzidian; Ethyrfield; Crawlblind; Drudge; Autocracy; Imminent Annihilation

Jägermeister Stage
Friday	Saturday	Sunday
The Heretic Order; Kamikaze Test Pilots; Untamed; Callus; Damaged Reich	Voodoo Sioux; Luke Appleton; Sinocence; Alpha Omega; Cranial Separation	Gemma Fox; Abduction; True Believer; Def Goldblum; Dawn of Anubis

VIP Bar Stage
Thursday	Friday	Saturday	Sunday
Vital Idol	Season of the Witch; Gator Bait; Metalhead	Spires; Pop-Up Puppet Cinema; Brule; Ten Foot Wizard	Peter Holland; Kapsel; Rekovered

=== 2019 ===
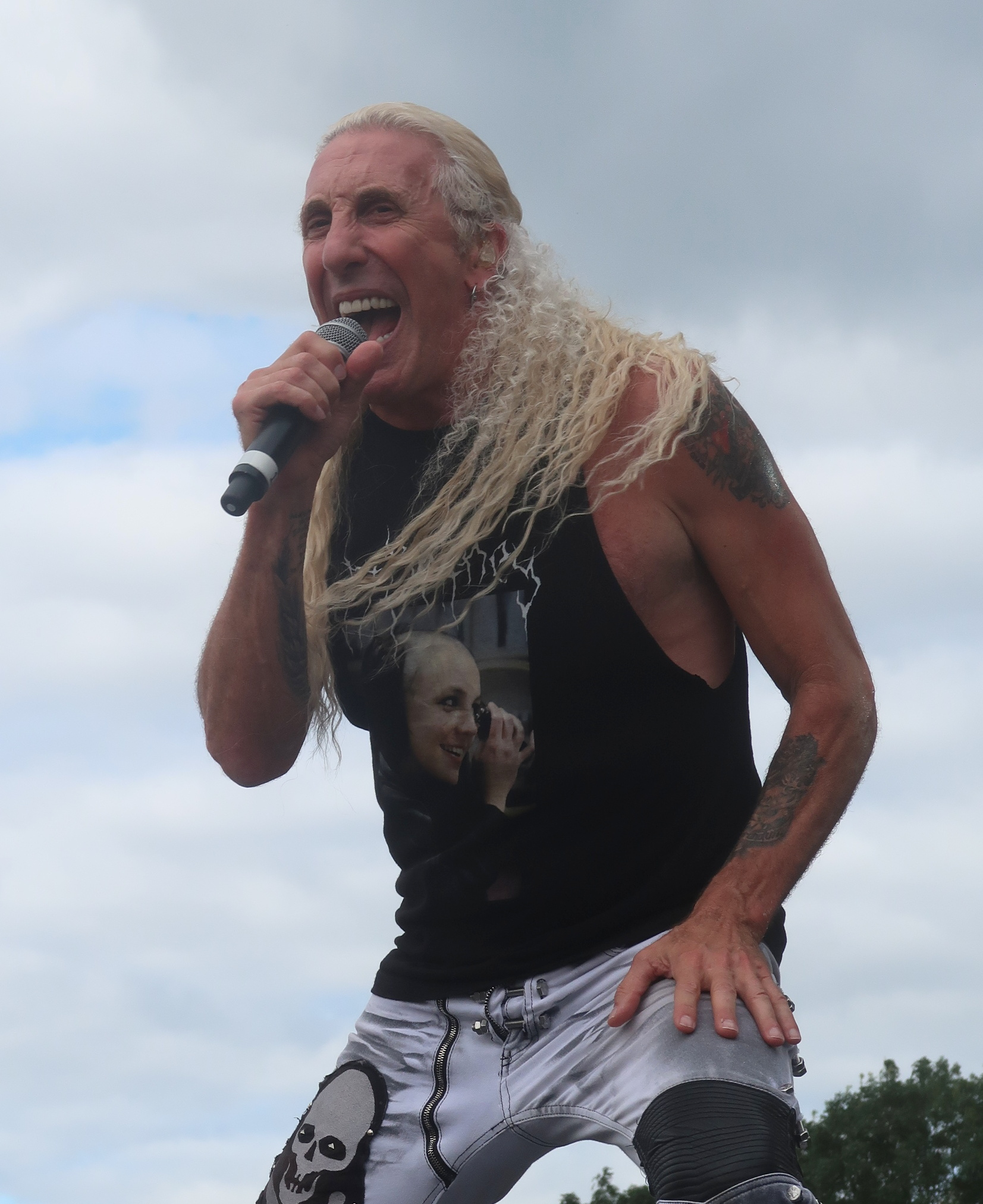
Dee Snider performing live at Bloodstock Open Air in 2019

BOA 2019 took place at Catton Hall between Thursday 8 August and Sunday 11 August 2019.

The announced lineup was:

Ronnie James Dio Stage
Friday	Saturday	Sunday
Sabaton; Powerwolf; Tesseract; Children of Bodom; Soulfly; Metal Church; Death Angel; Xentrix; Incite	Parkway Drive; Anthrax; The Wildhearts; Thy Art Is Murder; Evil Scarecrow; Swallow the Sun; Cancer Bats; Krysthla	Scorpions; Queensrÿche; Cradle of Filth; Dee Snider; Hypocrisy; Soilwork; Ross the Boss; Aborted; All Hail The Yeti

Sophie Lancaster Stage
Thursday	Friday	Saturday	Sunday
Rotting Christ; Ten Ton Slug; Footprints in the Custard; Blind River; Barbarian Hermit	Grand Magus; Raging Speedhorn; Countless Skies; Sulpher; Karybdis; Damnation's Hammer; BongCauldron; Def Con One; Blasphemer; Control the Storm; Zealot Cult	Taake; Divine Chaos; Black Shuck; 3 Headed Snake; Helheim; Dust Bolt; Red Method; Guardians of Time; Lotus Eater; Odd Crew; The Parallax Method	Eluveitie; Batushka; Bloodred Hourglass; Violblast; Crescent; Boss Keloid; Wheel; Solitary; Witch Tripper; Harbinger; Resin

Hobgoblin New Blood Stage
Friday	Saturday	Sunday
Anakim; Saurr; Gaia; Widows; MARW; Pravitas; Blind Divide; The Hope Burden; Tomorrow is Lost; Midnight Prophecy; Grand Elder; Death by Ki; Xero	Master's Call; Deformation of Man; Lock Horns; Djinova; Voidlurker; Empire Warning; Voluntas; Grief Ritual; Scars of Remembrance; Reaper X Goat Monsoon; Stormcast; Inferiem	The Lazys; Damim; Leadrobot; Sethiest; Golden Core; Lost In Lavender Town; Fear Bound; Aesect; Take Refuge; Elyrean; Bastard; Fallen Temples; 28 Double; Fractions

Jägermeister Stage
Friday	Saturday	Sunday
Skypilot; Beggar; Graves; Eyes of the Raven; Sophie Sparham	Daybreaker; Foul Body Autopsy; Black Falcon; Pemphigoid	Womenowar; Jailbirds; Victus; Jackal's Backbone; Crimson Tusk

VIP Bar Stage
Thursday	Friday	Saturday	Sunday
The Essence of Springsteen	Heavy Duty; The Brothers Keg; NPKR	Gorilla; Disgraceland; Slay Duggee	Forged In Black; The Lost Boys

Dimmu Borgir were booked to play the Ronnie James Dio stage on Sunday but pulled out due to illness, they were replaced by Batushka.

Code Orange were booked to play the Ronnie James Dio stage on Saturday but pulled out and were replaced by The Wildhearts.

Shvpes were booked to play the Sophie Lancaster stage on Saturday but pulled out and were replaced by Lotus Eater.

Generation Kill were booked to play the Sophie Lancaster stage on Saturday but pulled out and were replaced by Divine Chaos who were also moved up to the Special Guest slot as Skeletal Remains had to pull out as their ferry was cancelled due to bad weather.

Due to windy conditions, the Ronnie James Dio stage was unsafe for use on the Saturday evening, leading to Cradle of Filth being moved to the Sunday, taking Batushka's slot, with Batushka being moved to the Sophie Lancaster Stage, resulting in The Lazys being moved to the New Blood Stage. As well as this, Parkway Drive's and Anthrax's performances were both delayed until the Stage was deemed safe to use.

=== 2020 ===
BOA 2020 was due to take place at Catton Hall between Thursday, 6 August and Sunday, 9 August 2020 but was postponed due to the COVID-19 pandemic.

The announced lineup at the time of postponement was:

Ronnie James Dio Stage
Friday	Saturday	Sunday
Devin Townsend; Skindred; Phillip H. Anselmo & The Illegals; Dark Tranquillity; Sacred Reich; Acid Reign; Svalbard; Lost Society	Behemoth; Paradise Lost; Bury Tomorrow; Vio-lence; Jinjer; Sylosis; Toxic Holocaust; Conjurer; Savage Master	Judas Priest; Saxon; Gloryhammer; Orange Goblin; Life of Agony; Diamond Head; Butcher Babies; Idle Hands

Sophie Lancaster Stage
Thursday	Friday	Saturday	Sunday
The Night Flight Orchestra; Nekrogoblikon; The Crawling; Raised By Owls; Anakim	Bloodywood; Soen; Bossk; Exhumed; Necrot; Dog Tired	Cattle Decapitation; Memoriam; Ramage Inc; Winterfylleth; Viscera; Bailer; Sharks In Your Mouth; Video Nasties	Hatebreed; Unleash the Archers; Blasphemer; Green Lung; Black Tongue; Wolf Jaw; Vexed; Pist; Liberty Lies; Grave Lines

The Black Dahlia Murder were booked to play the Ronnie James Dio stage on Sunday but pulled out of all European summer shows due to the COVID-19 pandemic.

=== 2021 ===
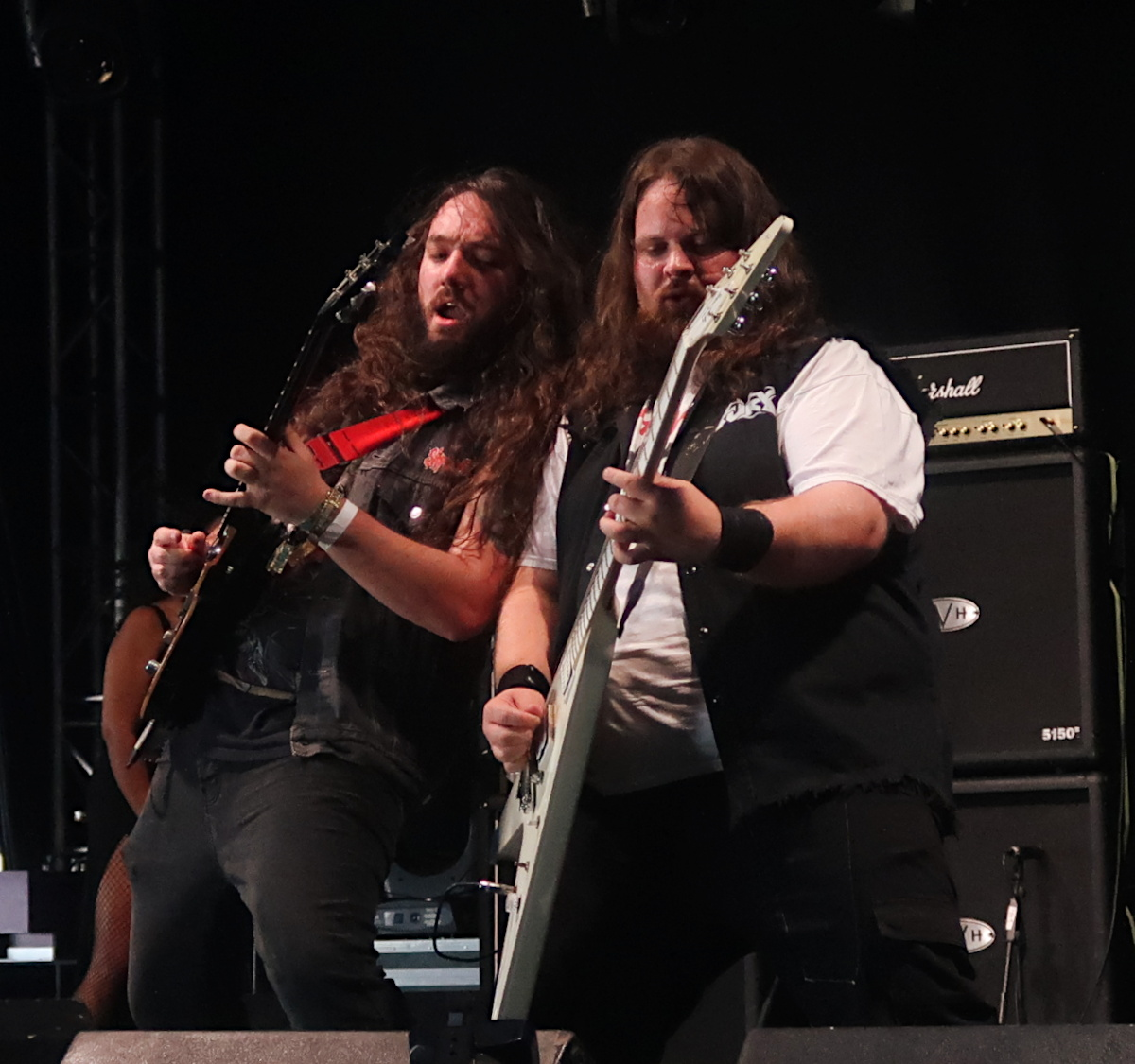
Fury performing at Bloodstock Open Air in 2021

BOA 2021 took place at Catton Hall between Wednesday 11 August and Sunday 15 August 2021. This is an extra day to the usual length of the festival owing to the postponement of the 2020 event.

Bloodstock Open Air 2021
Wednesday	Thursday	Friday	Saturday	Sunday
Ronnie James Dio Stage
stage closed	stage closed	Devin Townsend; Skindred; The Wildhearts; Venom Prison; Higher Power; Acid Reign; Svalbard; Divine Chaos; Foetal Juice	Kreator; Cradle of Filth; Paradise Lost; While She Sleeps; Malevolence; Wargasm; Conjurer; Borstal	Judas Priest; Saxon; Gloryhammer; Therapy? Orange Goblin; Bleed From Within; Diamond Head; Bloodshot Dawn; Seidrblot
Sophie Lancaster Stage
Onslaught; Beholder; Raised By Owls; Ward XVI; Anakim	Lawnmower Deth; Punk Rock Factory; The Crawling; King Witch; Famyne; Forlorn World; Seething Akira; Urne; Luna's Call; Ashen Crown; Thunderous Jones; Fury	Napalm Death; Conan; Evile; Raging Speedhorn; Shrapnel; Primitai; Garganjua; Dog Tired; Agrona; Deified; King Creature	Phil Campbell and the Bastard Sons; Memoriam; Ramage Inc; Winterfylleth; Viscera; XL-Life; Bailer; King Goat; Terra IV; Video Nasties; Netherhall	Evil Scarecrow; Black Spiders; Necronautical; Green Lung; Black Tongue; Wolf Jaw; Vexed; Pist; Liberty Lies; Grave Lines; Internal Conflict
Hobgoblin New Blood Stage
stage closed	Kurokuma; Battle Born; As The World Dies; Pemphigoid; Godeater; The Best Medicine; Slave Steel; Casket Feeder; Riptide; Solcura; Odysseus; Halveksia	Colpocleisis; Broken Jaw; Elder Druid; Sail; Sound of Origin; Beyond Salvation; Desolation; Beyond Extinction; Insurgent; Pearler; Severenth; Terminal Sun	Hanowar; Abduction; Grey Stag; The Ghoules; Nassau; Hawxx; Cottonmouth; Iron Tooth; Ascaris; Kinzoku; A Horse Called War; Black Atlas	Ghosts of Atlantis; Strangle Wire; Frozen In Shadows; Deitus; South of Salem; Fellowship; The Injester; This is Endless; Hybridize; Son of Boar; Words That Burn; Sorceress of Sin; Wired
Jägermeister Stage
stage closed	Ghosts Of Men; Milliner; Axiom; Master Charger; Bad Earth; King Corpse; Shackled; Tortured Demon	Häxan; Godless Suns; Ale of Adam; Black Emerald; Wall	Mountain Caller; Primitai; Lowen; The New Sun; Zookeeper	Gemma Fox; Boycott the Baptist; Trilobite; The Howling Tides; Spectral Darkwave
VIP Bar Stage
Heavy Metal Cabaret	Popestars	Heavy Duty; Chestburster; The Hyper Bowl; Slay Duggee	Daxx and Roxane; Heavy Metal Cabaret; Chris Ryan/Sam Rhodes/Dan Vallender; Forged In Black (acoustic)	Electric Funeral; Forged In Black; Andrew O'Neill; Alan Brown (acoustic)

Brian Blessed appeared at the festival on Sunday 15 August 2021, Brian announced Saxon onto the stage on the Sunday evening.

Loathe were scheduled to perform on the Ronnie James Dio stage on Friday 13 August 2021 but they pulled out due to a member testing positive for COVID-19, they were replaced by Higher Power

Sylosis were scheduled to perform on the Ronnie James Dio stage on Saturday 14 August 2021 but due to Josh Middleton having to self isolate after coming into contact with someone who had tested positive for COVID-19 at an Architects album release show, they were forced to pull out of the festival.

=== 2022 ===
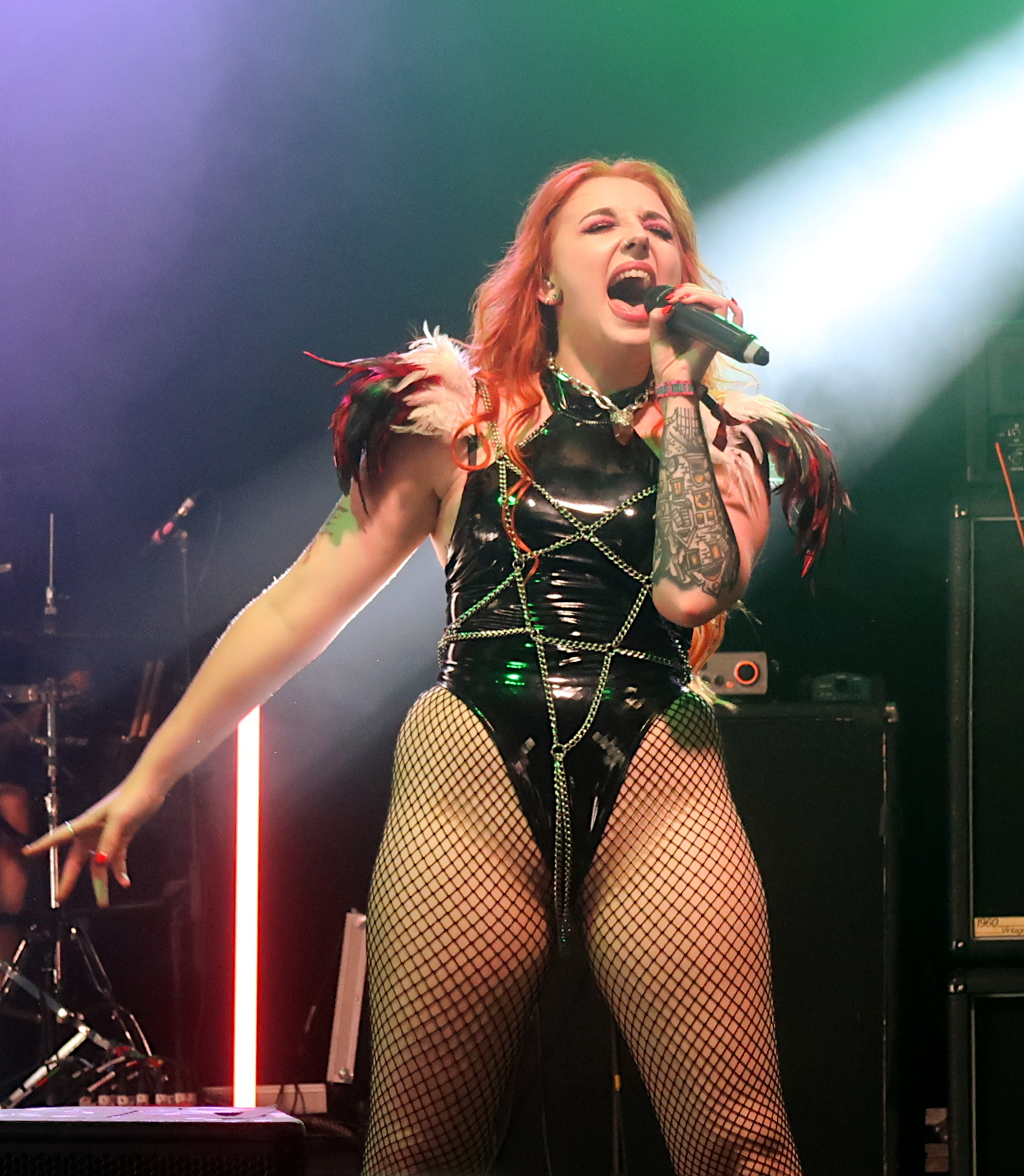
Sister Shotgun performing at Bloodstock Open Air in 2022

Bloodstock 2022 took place from 11 to 14 August 2022. 17 bands were announced, including headliners Lamb of God and Saturday Ronnie James Dio stage headliner Mercyful Fate.

- Life of Agony had to pull out due to a medical emergency, resulting in Skarlett Riot taking a slot on the main stage.
- On the Friday, Machine Head played an hour-long unannounced set on the Sophie Lancaster Stage

Bloodstock Open Air 2022
Thursday	Friday	Saturday	Sunday
Ronnie James Dio Stage
stage closed	Behemoth; Testament; Exodus; Gwar; Doyle; Bloodywood; Sorcerer; Heart Of A Coward; Red Method	Mercyful Fate; Dimmu Borgir; Bury Tomorrow; Jinjer; Sylosis; Lorna Shore; Spirit World; Lost Society; Baest	Lamb of God; Killing Joke; Dark Funeral; Cattle Decapitation; Venom Inc. Vio-lence; Butcher Babies; Vended; Skarlett Riot
Sophie Lancaster Stage
Dark Tranquillity; Nekrogoblikon; Nanowar of Steel; Mother Vulture; Thuum; Basement Torture Killings	Sleep Token; Avatar; Eyehategod; Heathen; Discharge; Machine Head; Party Cannon; Thrown into Exile; Inhuman Nature; Crepitation	Malevolence; Ferocious Dog; Samael; Ingested; Blood Youth; Defects; Cyhra; Cage Fight; Pupil Slicer; Mastiff; Sister Shotgun	The Night Flight Orchestra; Belphegor; Strigoi; Ill Niño; Orbit Culture; Heriot; Noctem; Guilt Trip; Desert Storm; Pelugion
New Blood Stage
stage closed	Tumandoomband; Fyresky; Mechanized; Verminthrone; Pariah; Fornoth; Haint; Catalysis; Existentialist; I Fight Bears; Ireosis; Nømadus; Hellfekted	Viction; Tribe Of Ghosts; Imperium; Collapse The Sky; Headpress; Novacrow; Steel Mage; Ambrius; Cast in Tephra; Portrayal of Ruinn; Draconian Reign; Silen; Collected	Torus; Denali; Must Kill; Sulvain; Karma's Puppet; Apollyon; Drip Fed Empire; Unburier; Devastator; Desenser; Callous Hands; Sweet May; Prolapse A.D.
Jagermeister Stage
stage closed	Syncolima; Certain Death; Swamp Coffin; Vulgar Dissection	The Kunts; Master Charger; Solar Sons; BOZ; Warlock A.D.	Acid Throne; Tooms; Deadlock Saints; Lore Of The Woodman
VIP Bar Stage
stage closed	Through Hell Into Paradise; Mezzotint	Heavy Metal Cabaret; Martin Feral	Rekovered; Caleb H

=== 2023 ===
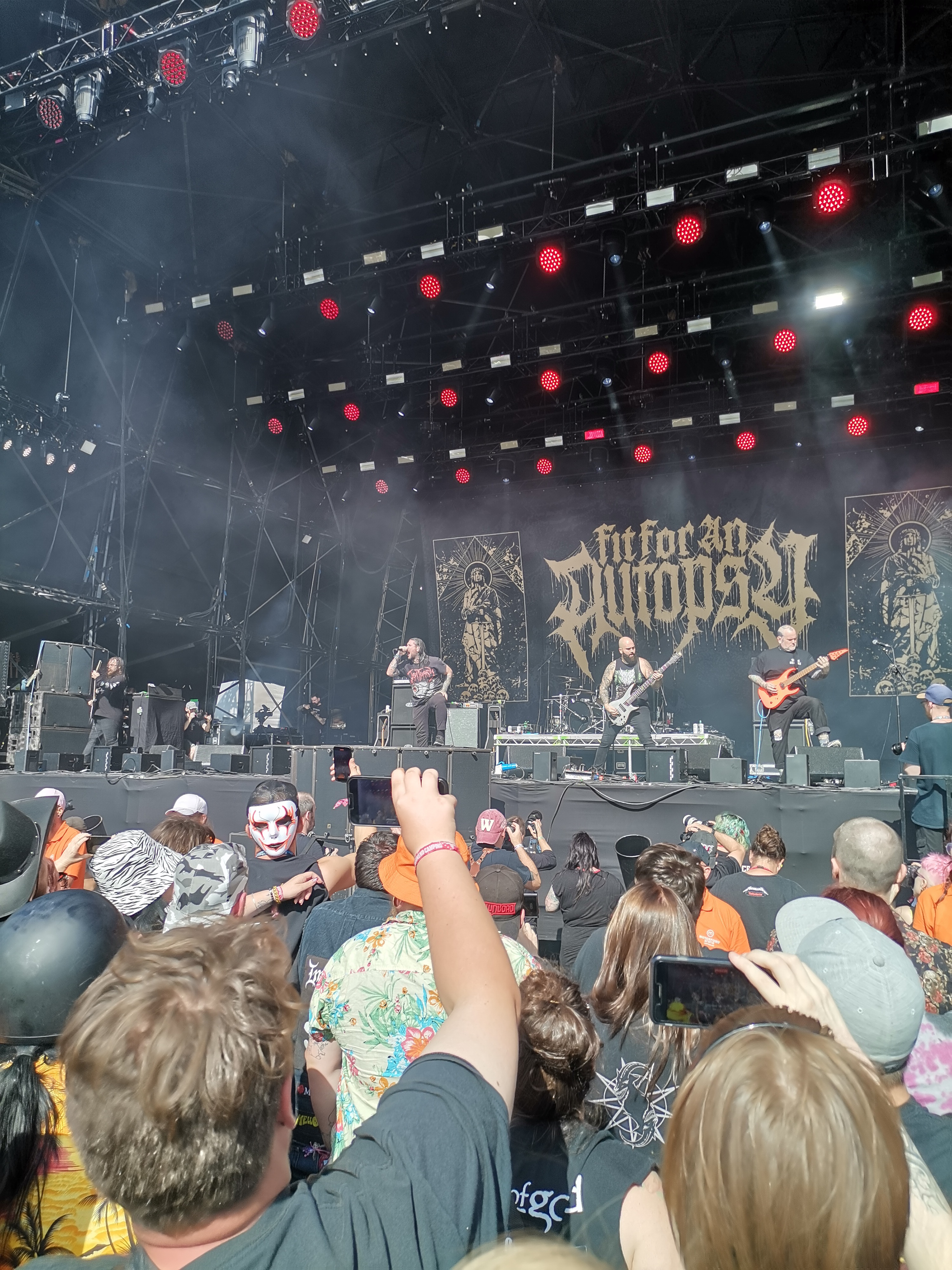
Fir for an Autopsy performing at Bloodstock Open Air in 2023

Bloodstock Festival 2023 took place on 10–13 August 2023. 8 bands were announced after Testament's set in 2022, including headliners Killswitch Engage and Megadeth.

Bloodstock Open Air 2023
Thursday	Friday	Saturday	Sunday
Ronnie James Dio Stage
stage closed	Killswitch Engage; In Flames; Heaven Shall Burn; Fit for an Autopsy; Gatecreeper; Sacred Reich; Hate; Wytch Hazel; Witchsorrow	Meshuggah; Triptykon performing Celtic Frost; Knocked Loose; Abbath; Crowbar; Employed to Serve; Royal Republic; Urne; Seething Akira	Megadeth; KK's Priest; Sepultura; Ugly Kid Joe; Decapitated; Tribulation; All Hail the Yeti; Uuhai; Dead Label
Sophie Lancaster Stage
SKYND; Visions of Atlantis; King 810; Frozen Soul; The Violent Inzident	Candlemass; Bossk; Gaerea; Fury; Zetra; Pest Control; The Enigma Division; Black Coast; Wolfbastard; Bloodyard	Brothers of Metal; Trollfest; Gutalax; Casketfeeder; Skin Failure; Dakesis; Tribe of Ghosts; The Grey; Tortured Demon; Ambrius	Biohazard; Zeal & Ardor; Embodiment; Church of the Cosmic Skull; Invisions; Cobra the Impaler; Tuskar; Stengah; Overthrone; Phoenix Lake
New Blood Stage
stage closed	Street Soldier; HEADPRESS; Moon Reaper; Square Wild; Voidwalker; LOKUST; Arms to Oblivion; Uridium; Apathy (UK)	Nakkeknaekker; Soothsayer; DROWND; Broken Calling; DeadBlondeStars; Extort; Vice; Swarms; Ofnus	.bHP; Lavein; Acid Age; Outergods; Sentient; Godeth; Skypilot; Nameless; Sanguinem; Elimination
Jagermeister Stage
stage closed	Hidden Intent; Dunes; Deathfiend; Wildheat; This Summit Fever	Water Lines; Muddi Brooke; Pryma; Repulsive Vision; Daybreaker	Iron Altar; Past The Fall; Skies Turn Black; Dead Air; Those Once Loyal
VIP Bar Stage
Guns 2 Roses	Motörwrecked; Dave McPherson; Lauren Jennifer	101% Pantera; Lewis Floyd Henry	Popestars

Russkaja were scheduled to perform but disbanded prior to the festival. Anthrax, Whitechapel, Nonpoint, Unto Others, Striker, Eyes and DevilDriver were also scheduled to perform but withdrew from the festival.

Helloween were scheduled to perform on the Sunday, but were forced to withdraw due to Michael Kiske contracting acute laryngitis. KK's Priest were announced as their replacement.

=== 2024 ===
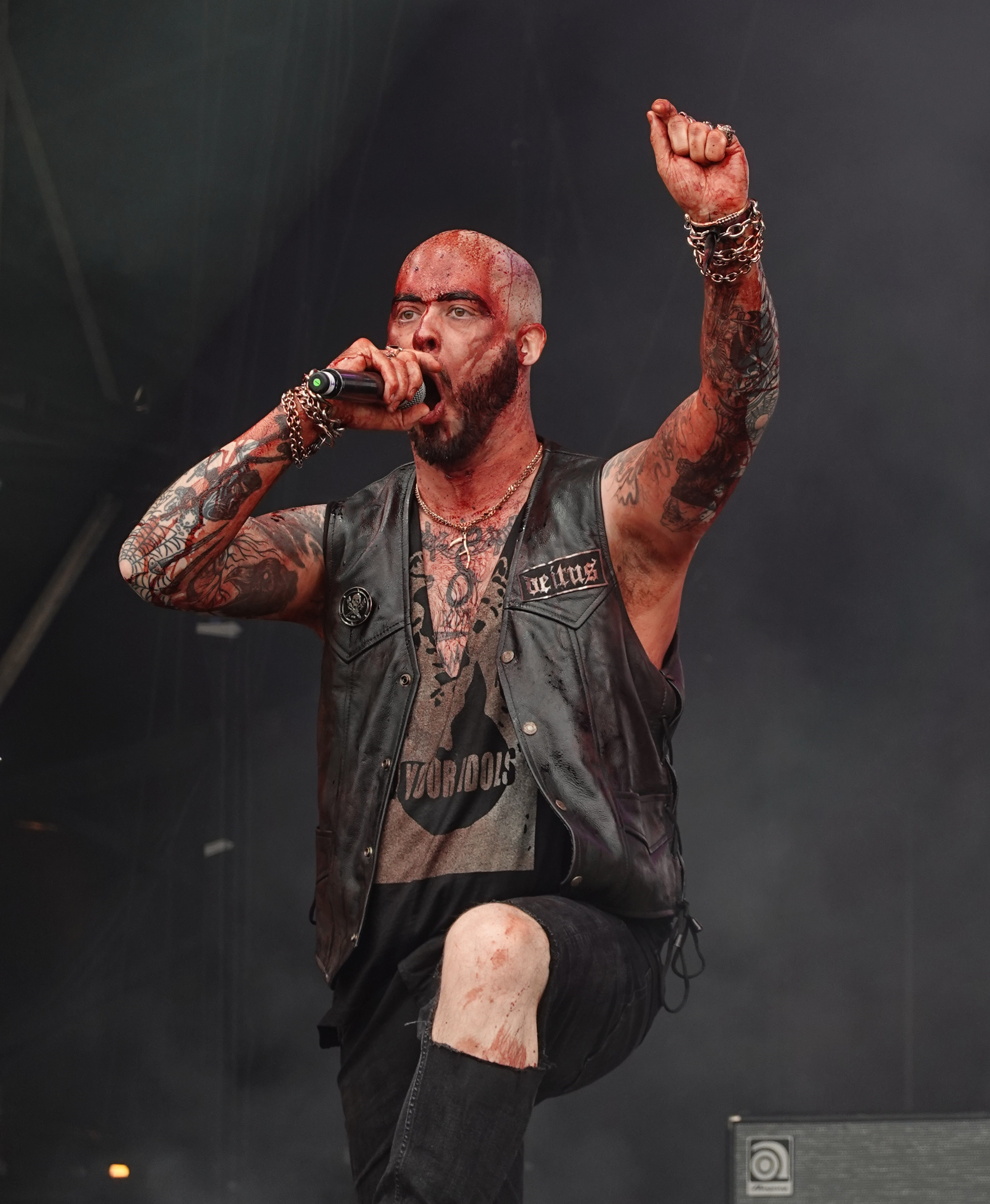
Deitus performing at Bloodstock Open Air in 2024

Bloodstock Festival 2024 took place from August 8 to August 11, 2024. 14 bands were announced after the In Flames set in 2023, including headliners Amon Amarth and Architects.

Bloodstock Open Air 2024
Thursday	Friday	Saturday	Sunday
Ronnie James Dio Stage
stage closed	Opeth; Clutch; Hatebreed; Enslaved; Rotting Christ; Grand Magus; Green Lung; Nervosa; Desert Storm	Architects; Malevolence; Whitechapel; Deicide; Unleash the Archers; Forbidden; Crypta; Ignea; Deitus	Amon Amarth; Carcass; Flogging Molly; The Night Flight Orchestra; Septicflesh; Beast in Black; Soen; Cultura Tres; Raised by Owls
Sophie Lancaster Stage
Evergrey; Hellripper; South of Salem; Tailgunner; Acid Age	Igorrr; The Vintage Caravan; Eternal Champion; Darkest Era; Wolf; Haliphron; Exist Immortal; DeathCollector; Burner; Haxan	Korpiklaani; Sylosis; Combichrist; Asomvel; Red Rum; Mimi Barks; Ludovico Technique; Enemies Everywhere; Unpeople; Cauldron	Satyricon; Infected Rain; Xentrix; Sadus; Ankor; Grove Street; Moon Reaper; Osiah; Awake by Design
Hopical Storm New Blood Stage
stage closed	She Burns Red; Final Coil; Disposable	Lost To Light; Praetorian; Biomechanimal	Sathamel; Akkadian; Straight For The Sun
EMP Stage
stage closed	Mab; King Kraken; Crowley; Lethal Evil; Lost Brethren	Lurcher; Rupcha Farms; Flamebearer; Parting With Origin; Public Execution	Loyds Trip; Yersin; Goblinsmoker; The Gallowgate Murders; Warpstormer
VIP Bar Stage

=== 2025 ===
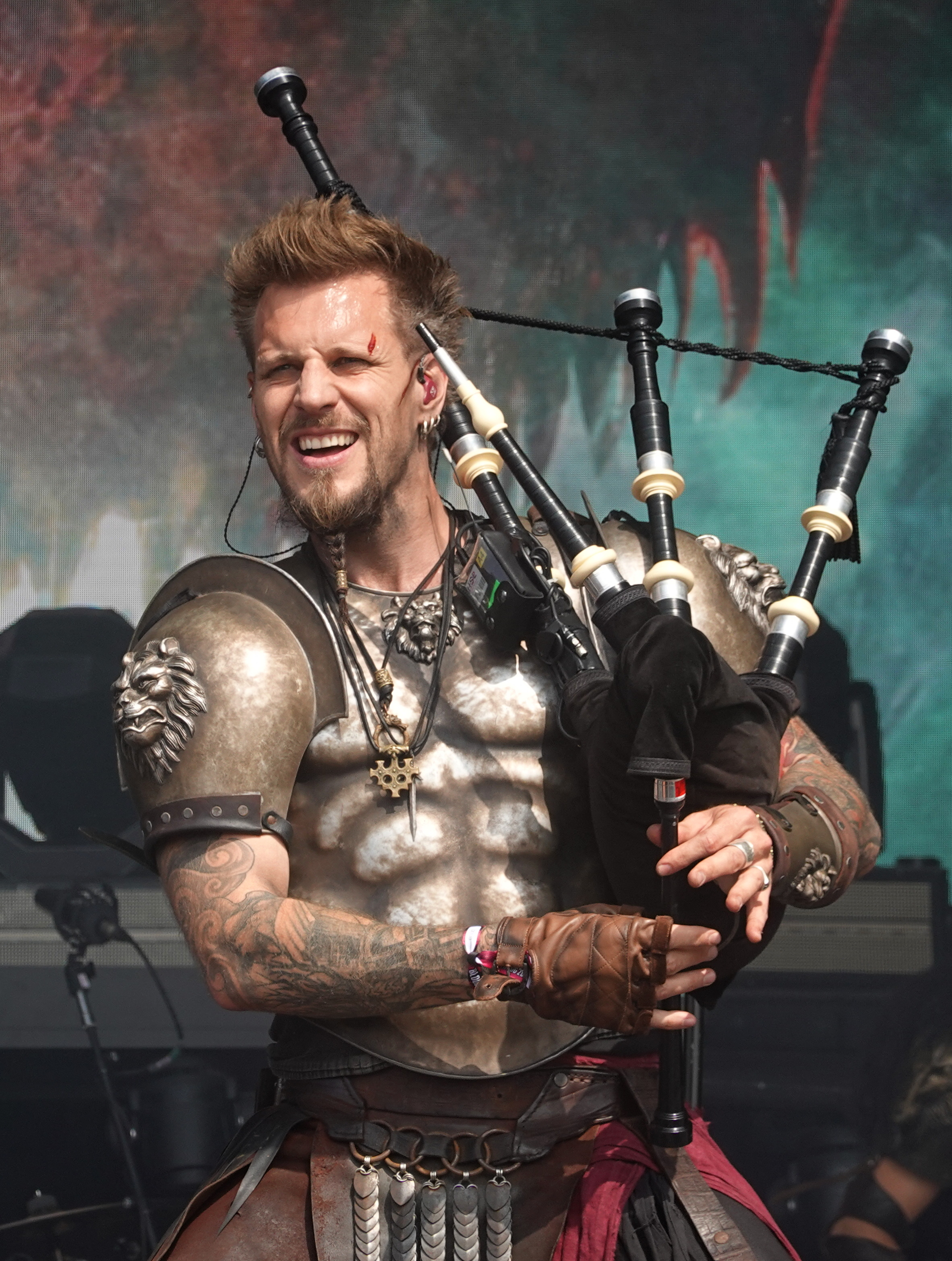
Feuerschwanz performing at Bloodstock Open Air in 2025

Bloodstock Festival 2025 took place on 7–10 August 2025. 19 bands were announced at 2024's festival including all three Ronnie James Dio Stage headliners and all four Sophie Lancaster Stage headliners after Clutch's set.

Bloodstock Open Air 2025
Thursday	Friday	Saturday	Sunday
Ronnie James Dio Stage
stage closed	Trivium; Emperor; Lacuna Coil; Orange Goblin; Paleface Swiss; Flotsam and Jetsam; Shrapnel; Famyne; Konvent	Machine Head; Ministry; Fear Factory; Kublai Khan; Creeper; Heriot; Warbringer; The Spirit; Cage Fight	Gojira; Mastodon; Lord of the Lost; The Black Dahlia Murder; Feuerschwanz; August Burns Red; Rivers of Nihil; One Machine; Ghosts of Atlantis
Sophie Lancaster Stage
Me And That Man; All For Metal; Gnome; Fourwaykill; Dead Flesh	Kataklysm; Nailbomb; High Parasite; Eihwar; Shade Empire; Rough Justice; My Diligence; Lock Horns; Turin; Ofnus	Static-X; Breed 77; Undeath; Neonfly; Phoenix Lake; Waterlines; Pengshui; Ba'al; Vnder A Crvmbling Moon; Ireosis	Obituary; 3 Inches of Blood; Thrown; Siglos; Lowen; Dogma; Wall; Frayle; Barbarian Hermit; Apathy (UK)
Hopical Storm New Blood Stage
stage closed	Devilhusk; Backseat Juliet; LN; Vmbra; Rascal; If It Bleeds; Ogun; Baelfyr; Thunarwulf; Compounds; Tealdeer; Lowdown; The Machinist	Fight The Champ; Unnatural Order; HeKz; Head Dent; Fortune Teller; Nothing Speaks; Mechromorph; Mantis Defeats Jaguar; Zebulon; Prodigal; Exorcism; Adfeilion; Symbyote	Bad Earth; Ruled By Raptors; Speak In Whispers; Preyrs; Koba; Head Count; Surya; Monochrome; Rizen; Ocean Planet; Theocracide; Spitting Teeth; The Cartographer
EMP Stage
stage closed	Desolator; Lust Ritual; Helldown; Shrike; Insidious Void	Thrashist Regime; Bad Smell; Rites to Ruin; Tiberius; Crown Solace	Z Machine; Phon; Orme; Maatkare; The Five Hundred
VIP Bar Stage
Robbed Zombie (Rob Zombie tribute)	L1nkn P4rk (Linkin Park tribute) Six Sins Till Sunday Professor Elemental Pop-Up Puppet Cinema (Puppet Parody Act)	Tool Shed (Tool tribute) Pop-Up Puppet Cinema (Puppet Parody Act)	Slipknowt (Slipknot tribute)

Lowen stepped in to replace Spirit Adrift a week prior to the festival when the latter pulled out for personal reasons.

=== 2026 ===
Bloodstock Festival took place on 6–9 August 2026. To coincide with the festival's twenty-fifth anniversary, 25 bands were announced at 2025's festival after Lacuna Coil's set, including all four of the Sophie Lancaster stage headliners and three Ronnie James Dio stage headliners. It was later announced that the Ronnie James Dio stage will open on the Thursday evening, with Saxon set to headline on that day.The festival's 25th anniversary edition was headlined by Judas Priest, who closed the festival on 9 August.

Bloodstock Open Air 2026
Thursday	Friday	Saturday	Sunday
Ronnie James Dio Stage
Saxon; Evil Scarecrow; Heavysaurus	Lamb Of God; Sepultura; Municipal Waste; Biohazard; Fit for an Autopsy; Life Of Agony; Skynd; Party Cannon; Battlesnake	Slaughter to Prevail; Bleed From Within; Nevermore; Northlane; Vended; Urne; The Scratch; Imperial Age; Inhuman Nature	Judas Priest; Body Count; Black Label Society; Testament; Orbit Culture; Kittie; Castle Rat; Graphic Nature; Bootyard Bandits
Sophie Lancaster Stage
Cryptopsy; Black Spiders; The Hell; Mantis Defeats Jaguar	Wednesday 13; Shining; Neckbreaker; Seething Akira; Excrementory Grindfuckers; Hidden Intent; Sellsword; Hammer; Blood Countess; Gurt	Leprous; Sanguisugabogg; Death Angel; Stampin' Ground; Celestial Sanctuary; Viking Skull; Bound In Fear; Imperium; Outergods; Froglord	Carpenter Brut; 200 Stab Wounds; Mushroomhead; Dream State; Thrown Into Exile; Noisepicker; Trivax; Alunah; Flayed Disciple; Acid Throne
New Blood Stage
stage closed	Atarka; Bailed Out; Concrete Age; Microtonal; Regicide; Temples on Mars; Void Below	Thrasherwolf Redscar Vampyra Apothis Descendancy Dead Bait Lektagon INSCAPE Withdrawn Shadow Company Imperial Demonic Chained Saint Imbrium	Sunk; Techologist; Joakem; Chekhovs Gun; Ka'aper; Overpower
EMP Stage
stage closed	Vanitas; Soulride; After Smoke Clears; Change Persona; Untamed Silence	Dosed; Troll Mother; Tempest Saint; Cancel the Transmission; Goat Major	Aethoria; The Cartoon Cartel; Following the Signs; Wrex; Stitched
VIP Bar Stage

Of Mice & Men and Death Angel were originally announced to perform on the Saturday at the Ronnie James Dio stage. Due to logistical issues, they were swapped to the Sophie Lancaster stage, with Nevermore and Urne taking their main stage slots. Of Mice & Men ultimately cancelled their European tour due to unforeseen circumstances; Sanguisugabogg was announced as their replacement.

=== 2027 ===
2027's event is scheduled to take place on 5–8 August 2027. 27 bands were announced after Municipal Waste's set in 2026, including all three Ronnie James Dio stage headliners, and all four Sophie Lancaster stage headliners.

Bloodstock Open Air 2027
Thursday	Friday	Saturday	Sunday
Ronnie James Dio Stage
stage closed	Mercyful Fate; Acid Bath; Imminence; HammerFall; The Halo Effect; Witch Club Satan; Dvne; Conan; Pintglass	Electric Callboy; Green Lung; DevilDriver; Corrosion of Conformity; Decapitated; Make Them Suffer; Gutalax; Tortured Demon; Dog Tired	Motionless in White; Children of Bodom; Wind Rose; Sylosis; Hypocrisy; Carnifex; Humanity's Last Breath; Pest Control; Brat
Sophie Lancaster Stage
Madball; Calva Louise; Cryptic Shift; Steak; Redeemon	Gaerea; Pig Destroyer; Gama Bomb; Dool; False Reality; Divine Chaos; The Five Hundred; Pryma; Endeavour; Muddi Brooke	Kanonenfieber; Spitting Glass; Luna Kills; The Zenith Passage; Vctms; Space of Variations; Eville; Left to Suffer; Devora; De Profundis	Dethklok; Fulci; The Acacia Strain; Crisix; Khemmis; Uburen; Blynd; Viscera; Only Pain; Soldiers of Rage
New Blood Stage
stage closed			
EMP Stage
stage closed			
VIP Bar Stage

== Metal 2 The Masses ==
Metal 2 The Masses (M2TM) is a grassroots battle-of-the-bands style contest run by Bloodstock to spotlight unsigned metal bands. Bands compete in local heats and finals across the UK, with winners earning a slot on the “New Blood” stage across the three days. The scheme was started in 2005 and since then has continued to expand. As of 2026, it is held in the following cities:

- Sheffield
- The Channel Islands
- Northants
- Hitchin
- Larnaca
- South Coast
- Belfast
- Leeds
- Edinburgh
- East Anglia
- Manchester
- Newcastle
- Birmingham
- Wrexham
- Brighton
- Newport
- Kent
- Somerset
- Nottingham
- Cheltenham
- London
- Burnley
- Saltash
- Coventry
- Nuneaton
- Oxford
- Stoke
- Bristol
- Liverpool
- Sandnes
- Chorzów

== Winter Gathering ==
Beginning December 2025, Bloodstock holds the Winter Gathering event at KK’s Steel Mill in Wolverhampton. A much smaller, one day, two stage, indoor festival. Featuring established UK and international metal bands, bands tied to Bloodstock and Metal 2 The Masses and usually a double headliner.

== See also ==
- Damnation Festival, England
- Wacken Open Air, Germany
- List of music festivals in the United Kingdom
