= Godsized =

Godsized is a four-piece English rock band. Formed in 2008, they name their influences as Black Sabbath, Led Zeppelin, and the alcoholic beverage Jägermeister. They have been the subject of feature articles and reviews in Kerrang!, Metal Hammer and Rock Sound magazines, and their track "Fight and Survive" was played on BBC Radio's Friday Rock Show.

The band's lineup comprises Glen Korner (vocals and guitars), Chris Charles (guitars), Gavin Kerrigan (bass), and Dan Kavanagh (drums). Previous and founding members were Neil Fish (guitars) and Andy Robinson (drums).

Kerrang! called them "cut from the same cloth" as Black Label Society (who toured Europe with Godsized as their support in 2011). Metal Hammer magazine said they have "what it takes to be the next British metal band to make an impact on a global scale."

Godsized has released two EPs, Brothers in Arms (2008) and The Phoney Tough & The Crazy Brave (2010). In 2013, they released their first full-length album, Time. In 2015 they released Heavy Lies the Crown.

The band has received positive reviews of their EPs and live shows in the UK's mainstream rock press. They played at the Download Festival in 2010, supported My Ruin's UK tour in 2012, Black Label Society in their world tour 2012 and Monster Magnet in the UK and Europe in 2013.
