= 2010 in heavy metal music =

This is a timeline documenting the events of heavy metal in the year 2010.

== Bands formed ==
- Æther Realm
- A Breach of Silence
- Blood Revolt
- Deafheaven
- Esprit D'Air
- Rifftera
- The Soulless
- Sulphur Aeon

== Bands disbanded ==
- Abscess
- Acheron
- The Autumn Offering
- Despised Icon
- Destroy the Runner
- Detente
- Dio
- Fear My Thoughts
- Fellsilent
- Finch
- Gwen Stacy
- Heaven & Hell
- Ignominious Incarceration
- Isis
- Luna Mortis
- Narnia
- The Number Twelve Looks Like You
- Red Harvest
- Revolution Renaissance
- Salt the Wound
- Theatre of Tragedy
- We Were Gentlemen
- Wrench in the Works
- Xasthur
- Zyklon

== Bands reformed ==
- Abruptum
- Acheron
- Autopsy
- Battleaxe
- Coroner
- Empyrium
- Exhumed
- Godflesh
- Lord Belial
- Lock Up
- Morgoth
- Murderdolls
- Nightfall
- Quiet Riot
- Salt the Wound
- Sanctuary
- Soundgarden
- Tokyo Blade
- Voivod
- Wastefall

== Books ==
- Cult of Luna released a book explaining the full story behind their Eternal Kingdom album. The book is written in Swedish and translated into English, and the hardcover includes an audiobook.

== Events ==
- Slayer front-man/bassist Tom Araya underwent back surgery.
- Emperor Magus Caligula, B-Force and Dominator all quit Dark Funeral.
- Rush was inducted into the Canadian Songwriters Hall of Fame.
- Mayhem Festival 2010 toured through North America from July through August. The third annual tour was co-headlined by Korn and Rob Zombie.
- Guitarist Jani Stefanovic quit Solution .45.
- Scorpions announced that they will retire after touring in support of final album Sting in the Tail.
- AC/DC headlined Download Festival, marking their return to Donington for the first time in 19 years, since 1991's Monsters of Rock. Rage Against the Machine and Aerosmith also headlined.
- In Flames founding member Jesper Strömblad quit the band in February after 17 years due to personal problems.
- Original Megadeth bassist Dave Ellefson rejoined the band after departing in 2002.
- Mike Portnoy of Dream Theater joined Avenged Sevenfold after the death of The Rev to record their fifth studio album, Nightmare. The results of The Rev's toxicology reports were released in June 2010, which revealed the cause of death as an accidental overdose from prescription drugs.
- Belarusian officials banned Rammstein from the country due to their "violence, masochism, homosexuality and other abnormalities".
- US death metal band The Famine's studio burnt down, along with their gear and recorded material for what would be their 2011 album, The Architects of Guilt.
- Behemoth front-man Adam "Nergal" Darski went to court over a Bible ripping incident in 2007, and was found not guilty on the basis that "the defendant's behaviour wasn't recognised as a crime."
- Richard Rietdijk, a keyboardist for the band Textures, left the band as he wanted to pursue other musical interests.
- Type O Negative front-man Peter Steele died at age 48 on April 14, 2010.
- The Human Abstract replaced former lead singer Nathan Ells with Travis Richter (The Color of Violence, ex-From First to Last) and founding guitarist A. J. Minette returned.
- Judas Priest won the 2010 Grammy Award for Best Metal Performance of "Dissident Aggressor."
- Debauchery front-man Thomas "The Bloodbeast" Gurrath was fired from his job as a philosophy trainee teacher at a high school in Stuttgart, Germany, for being in a death metal band.
- Anthrax reunited with former singer Joey Belladonna after his previous departure in 2007.
- The first ever Sri Lankan metal documentary, Arise - The Sri Lankan Metal Music Documentary, was officially screened on 15 May 2010 at Alliance Française de Colombo, Sri Lanka.
- Ronnie James Dio died of stomach cancer at the age of 67 on May 16, 2010.
- Bay Area Metal legend Debbie Abono died of cancer at age 80, also on May 16, 2010.
- Ozzfest returned with bands such as Ozzy Osbourne, Mötley Crüe, Rob Halford and DevilDriver on the bill.
- Former bassist Noah Martin rejoined Arsis.
- The Westboro Baptist Church planned to picket the Ronnie James Dio Memorial Service at The Hall of Liberty in Forest Lawn Hollywood Hills.
- Slipknot bassist Paul Gray died at age 38 on May, 25, 2010.
- Ratt were forced to cancel their European tour due to Stephen Pearcy having to undergo emergency hernia surgery.
- On June 16, "The Big Four of Thrash Metal", Anthrax, Megadeth, Slayer and Metallica, played together for the first time at the Sonisphere Festival at Bemowo Airport in Warsaw, Poland.
- The second event of Heavy MTL was held in Montreal on July 24 and 25, with bands such as Slayer, Testament, Megadeth, Halford, Alice Cooper, and Avenged Sevenfold.
- Early Graves vocalist Makh Daniels died in an automobile accident on August 1, 2010. The Funeral Pyre guitarist Justin Garcia fell asleep behind the wheel, and was taken with guitarist Tyler Jensen to the hospital with non-life-threatening injuries.
- Fear Factory members narrowly avoided a bus fire caused by the rear-wheel catching fire. Their trailer was left unscathed.
- Death of Desire vocalist Dawn Desirée was kidnapped by unknown members of a promotion agency, and guitarist Morbid was assaulted.
- Reunited Byzantine returned without Tony Rohrbough, and introduced Brian Henderson as their new lead-guitarist.
- Behemoth front-man Adam "Nergal" Darski was hospitalized due to advanced stage leukemia. Behemoth subsequently cancelled all remaining summer festivals, and their Russian, Baltic States, and US tour. Adam "Nergal" Darski underwent a bone marrow transplant surgery.
- Acid Reign announced that producer Bill Metoyer will be re-mastering and re-issuing their albums.
- X Japan planned a North American tour after both Otakon and Lollapalooza, visiting Canada and the United States.
- After 25 years, Mike Portnoy leaves Dream Theater on September 8, 2010.
- Ari Nissilä, Toni Kansanoja, Kari Vähäkuopus, and Mikko Nevanlahti all leave Catamenia on October 4, 2010.
- 2000s supergroup Murderdolls re-formed and release their 2nd and final studio album Women and Children Last.
- Sweet Savage founding guitarist Trevor Fleming died on October 2, 2010.
- Gotthard singer Steve Lee died on October 5, 2010.
- Guitarist Tommy Church left The Autumn Offering on November 1, 2010.
- Queensrÿche survived a bomb attack in Iraq while playing to the American troops.
- Armando Acosta, the ex-drummer of Saint Vitus, died on November 25, 2010.
- King Diamond underwent a successful triple-bypass surgery on November 29, 2010.
- Former Dream Theater drummer Mike Portnoy left Avenged Sevenfold.

== Films ==
- MVD Visual and Sexy Intellectual released a documentary DVD about Rage Against the Machine on February 23. The film is titled Revolution in the Head: Rage Against the Machine and the Art of Protest.
- Industrial metal act Ministry released their film Fix: The Ministry Movie in 2010.
- Mathawaada Chithrapata released the first Sri Lankan metal music documentary titled Arise – The Sri Lankan Metal Music Documentary showcasing the lives and the reasons behind the Sri Lankan metal music scene.
- Metallica, Anthrax, Slayer, and Megadeth released The Big 4 DVD Box Set on November 2, featuring footage of all the bands' live sets from the Big 4 tour.

== Albums released ==
All releases are studio albums unless otherwise noted. The most successful metal album released in 2010 was Iron Maiden's The Final Frontier, topping the charts in 28 countries. It was also No. 1 in Metal Hammer's list of '50 Greatest albums of 2010'.

=== January ===
Day	Artist	Album
4	Textures	Extracts 2004–2009 (compilation)
5	Marc Rizzo	Legionnaire
14	Aborted	Coronary Reconstruction
15	Dark Sanctuary	Dark Sanctuary
15	Demonic Resurrection	The Return to Darkness
15	Exodus	Shovel Headed Tour Machine: Live at Wacken & Other Assorted Atrocities (live DVD/CD)
15	Ace Frehley	Behind the Player (DVD)
15	Mnemic	Sons of the System
18	Abigor	Time Is The Sulphur in the Veins of the Saint
18	Shining	Blackjazz
18	Valkyrja	Contamination
19	Six Feet Under	Graveyard Classics 3
19	Sigh	Scenes from Hell
19	Sons of Azrael	Scouting the Boneyard
20	Royal Hunt	X
21	Tokyo Blade	Live in Germany (DVD)
22	Dark Fortress	Ylem
22	Node	In the End Everything Is a Gag
22	Orden Ogan	Easton Hope
24	Primordial	All Empires Fall (DVD)
25	Deathbound	Non Compos Mentis
25	Dream Evil	In the Night
25	Ihsahn	After
25	In Mourning	Monolith
25	Myrath	Desert Call
25	Orphaned Land	The Never Ending Way of ORWarriOR
26	Apocalyptica	MAG: S.V.E.R. (soundtrack)
26	Fozzy	Chasing the Grail
26	Greeley Estates	No Rain, No Rainbow
26	Living Sacrifice	The Infinite Order
26	Suicidal Tendencies	Live at the Olympic Auditorium (DVD)
27	Troll	Neo-Satanic Supremacy
29	Bruce Kulick	BK3
29	Crematory	Infinity
29	Excalion	High Time
29	Freedom Call	Legend of the Shadowking
29	Gamma Ray	To the Metal!
29	Nydvind	Sworn to the Elders
29	Keel	Streets of Rock & Roll
29	Overkill	Ironbound

=== February ===
Day	Artist	Album
1	Blaze Bayley	Promise and Terror
2	Charred Walls of the Damned	Charred Walls of the Damned
2	Nostradameus	Illusion's Parade
2	Rob Zombie	Hellbilly Deluxe 2
2	Through the Eyes of the Dead	Skepsis
5	Arsis	Starve for the Devil
5	Meshuggah	Alive (live CD/DVD)
5	Necrodeath	Old Skull (cover album)
5	Rage	Strings to a Web
6	Buckethead	Shadows Between the Sky
8	Ov Hell	The Underworld Regime
9	Fear Factory	Mechanize
9	Icarus Witch	Draw Down the Moon
9	Killing Time	Three Steps Back
9	Look What I Did	Atlas Drugged
15	Sarah Jezebel Deva	A Sign of Sublime
15	Rotting Christ	Aealo
15	Six Magics	Behind the Sorrow
16	Carnifex	Hell Chose Me
16	Chelsea Grin	Desolation of Eden
17	Finntroll	Nifelvind
19	Eluveitie	Everything Remains (As It Never Was)
19	Fuck the Facts	Unnamed (EP)
19	Jon Oliva's Pain	Festival
19	Throes of Dawn	The Great Fleet of Echoes
20	Stam1na	Viimeinen Atlantis
20	Voltax	Fugitive State Of Mind
22	Abscess	Dawn of Inhumanity
22	At the Gates	The Flames of the End (DVD set)
22	Borknagar	Universal
23	High on Fire	Snakes for the Divine
23	Mutiny Within	Mutiny Within
24	Dark Tranquillity	We Are the Void
24	Kalmah	12 Gauge
24	Reflexion	Edge
26	Catamenia	Cavalcade

=== March ===
Day	Artist	Album
1	Mortemia	Misere Mortem
2	Derdian	New Era Pt. 3 – The Apocalypse
3	Ludicra	The Tenant
3	Metsatöll	Äio
5	Soulgrind	The Tuoni Pathway
8	Burzum	Belus
8	White Wizzard	Over the Top
9	The Bled	Heat Fetish
9	Daughters	Daughters
9	Demon Hunter	The World Is a Thorn
9	Immolation	Majesty and Decay
9	Of Mice & Men	Of Mice & Men
12	Theatre of Tragedy	Addenda (EP)
15	Katatonia	The Longest Year (EP)
15	Killing Addiction	Fall of the Archetypes
15	Christopher Lee	Charlemagne: By the Sword and the Cross
16	Armored Saint	La Raza
16	Fireball Ministry	Fireball Ministry
16	Landmine Marathon	Sovereign Descent
16	Serj Tankian	Elect the Dead Symphony (live DVD/CD)
16	Wrench in the Works	Decrease / Increase
19	Sadist	Season in Silence
19	Scorpions	Sting in the Tail
19	Unleashed	As Yggdrasil Trembles
22	Enthroned	Pentagrammaton
22	Poisonblack	Of Rust and Bones
22	Ragnarok	Collectors of the King
22	Triptykon	Eparistera Daimones
23	Diabolic	Excisions of Exorcisms
23	The Dillinger Escape Plan	Option Paralysis
23	Down	Diary of a Mad Band: Europe in the Year of VI (live DVD/CD)
24	Svartsot	Mulmets Viser
26	Cathedral	The Guessing Game
26	Heidevolk	Uit oude Grond
26	Negură Bunget	Vîrstele Pamîntului
26	Wuthering Heights	Salt
26	Xasthur	Portal of Sorrow
29	Alcest	Écailles de Lune
30	Pantera	1990–2000: A Decade of Dominance (compilation)
30	Rotten Sound	Napalm (EP)
31	Kiuas	Lustdriven

=== April ===
Day	Artist	Album
2	The Foreshadowing	Oionos
2	The Vision Bleak	Set Sail to Mystery
3	Avantasia	Angel of Babylon
3	Avantasia	The Wicked Symphony
3	Salem	Playing God and Other Short Stories
5	DarkSun	Touching the Sun
5	October File	Our Souls To You
5	Primitive Graven Image	Celebrating Impending Chaos
6	Slash	Slash
6	Darkthrone	Circle the Wagons
6	Upon a Burning Body	The World Is Ours
6	Veil of Maya	[id]
9	Solution .45	For Aeons Past
13	Astral Doors	Requiem of Time
13	Bison B.C.	Dark Ages
13	Bleeding Through	Bleeding Through
13	Cancer Bats	Bears, Mayors, Scraps & Bones
13	Judgement Day	Peacocks/Pink Monsters
13	The Ocean	Heliocentric
13	War of Ages	Eternal
13	Lair of the Minotaur	Evil Power
13	Woe of Tyrants	Threnody
13	Wormrot	Abuse
16	Periphery	Periphery
19	Order of Ennead	An Examination of Being
20	Kayo Dot	Coyote
20	Engel	Threnody
20	Ratt	Infestation
20	Sevendust	Cold Day Memory
20	Sick of It All	Based on a True Story
23	Audiovision	Focus
23	Candlemass	Ashes to Ashes Live (live DVD)
23	Tarot	Gravity of Light
26	1349	Demonoir
26	Axel Rudi Pell	The Crest
26	Bullet for My Valentine	Fever
26	Kivimetsän Druidi	Betrayal, Justice, Revenge
26	Master	The Human Machine
26	Raintime	Psychromatic
26	Skyforger	Kurbads
27	Drowning Pool	Drowning Pool
27	Mouth of the Architect	The Violence Beneath (EP)
27	Twilight	Monument To Time End
30	Eisregen	Schlangensonne
30	Lacrimas Profundere	The Grandiose Nowhere
30	Rhapsody of Fire	The Frozen Tears of Angels
30	Saltatio Mortis	Manufactum II

=== May ===
Day	Artist	Album
4	Deftones	Diamond Eyes
4	Dokken	Greatest Hits
4	Godsmack	The Oracle
4	Nonpoint	Miracle
5	Ufomammut	Eve
6	Defeated Sanity	Chapters of Repugnance
7	Exodus	Exhibit B: The Human Condition
7	Pro-Pain	Absolute Power
8	Violator	Annihilation Process (EP)
10	Keep of Kalessin	Reptilian
10	Madder Mortem	Where Dream and Day Collide (EP)
11	As I Lay Dying	The Powerless Rise
11	Beneath the Sky	In Loving Memory
11	Brain Drill	Quantum Catastrophe
11	Fuck the Facts	Disgorge Mexico: The DVD (DVD)
11	Howl	Full of Hell
11	Low Twelve	Splatter Pattern
11	Misery Index	Heirs to Thievery
11	Attila	Rage
14	Black Majesty	In Your Honor
14	Mael Mórdha	Manannán
14	Pretty Maids	Pandemonium
15	Kekal	8
17	Cynic	Re-Traced (EP)
17	Annihilator	Annihilator
18	Anew Revolution	iMerica
18	Fleshgod Apocalypse	Mafia (EP)
18	Iced Earth	Box of the Wicked (box set)
18	Silent Civilian	Ghost Stories
18	Widow Sunday	In These Rusted Veins
19	Loudness	King of Pain
19	Pain of Salvation	Road Salt One
21	Aeon	Path of Fire
21	Detente	Decline
21	Heaven Shall Burn	Invictus (Iconoclast III)
21	Masterplan	Time To Be King
21	Sabaton	Coat of Arms
21	Y&T	Facemelter
24	Dew-Scented	Invocation
24	Enforcer	Diamonds
24	Leng Tch'e	Hypomanic
25	Black Tusk	Taste the Sin
25	Dir En Grey	Uroboros (DVD)
25	Krokus	Hoodoo
25	Rosetta	A Determinism of Morality
25	Soulfly	Omen
25	Starkweather	This Sheltering Night
26	Sotajumala	Kuolemanpalvelus
28	Disbelief	Heal
28	Enemy of the Sun	Caedium
28	Exilia	Naked
28	Magica	Dark Diary
31	Anathema	We're Here Because We're Here
31	Lyzanxia	Locust
31	Nevermore	The Obsidian Conspiracy
31	Slechtvalk	A Forlorn Throne

=== June ===
Day	Artist	Album
1	Diskreet	Engage The Mechanicality
1	Stick to Your Guns	The Hope Division
2	Primal Fear	16.6- All Over The World (live DVD)
2	Primal Fear	Live in the USA (live CD)
4	Five Star Prison Cell	Matriarch
4	Vanden Plas	The Seraphic Clockwork
7	Purified in Blood	Under Black Skies
7	Watain	Lawless Darkness
8	Attack Attack!	Attack Attack!
8	Circle of Dead Children	Psalm of the Grand Destroyer
8	Eyes Set to Kill	Broken Frames
8	The Funeral Pyre	Vultures at Dawn
8	The Haunted	Road Kill (CD/DVD)
8	Lamb of God	Hourglass: The Anthology (box set)
8	Kingdom of Sorrow	Behind the Blackest Tears
8	MyChildren MyBride	Lost Boy
8	Nachtmystium	Addicts: Black Meddle, Part II
8	Whitechapel	A New Era of Corruption
8	The Ghost Inside	Returners
10	Mekong Delta	Wanderer on the Edge of Time
14	Grave	Burial Ground
14	Setherial	Ekpyrosis
15	In Fear and Faith	Imperial
15	Ozzy Osbourne	Scream
18	Equilibrium	Rekreatur
21	Angelus Apatrida	Clockwork
21	Kerion	The Origins
21	Kvelertak	Kvelertak
21	Ramesses	Take The Curse
21	Witchery	Witchkrieg
22	Agora (MX)	En La Nada (single)
22	Danzig	Deth Red Sabaoth
22	Early Graves	Goner
22	Yakuza	Of Seismic Consequence
23	Amorphis	Forging The Land of Thousand Lakes (DVD)
23	Charon	A-Sides, B-Sides & Suicides (Compilation)
23	Coldrain	Nothing Lasts Forever (EP)
23	Grand Magus	Hammer of the North
26	Stigmata	Psalms of Conscious Martyrdom
28	Sodom	Lords of Depravity II (DVD)
28	Severe Torture	Slaughtered
29	Haste the Day	Attack of the Wolf King
29	Knut	Wonder
29	Mastodon	Jonah Hex: Revenge Gets Ugly (EP)
29	Parkway Drive	Deep Blue
30	Edenbridge	Solitaire

=== July ===
Day	Artist	Album
2	Contrive	The Internal Dialogue
2	Soilwork	The Panic Broadcast
6	Helstar	Rising from the Grave
6	The Tony Danza Tapdance Extravaganza	Danza III: The Series of Unfortunate Events
6	Valkyrie	Man of Two Visions
6	A Plea for Purging	The Marriage of Heaven and Hell
6	Texas Hippie Coalition	Rollin'
12	Norma Jean	Meridional
12	Devil Sold His Soul	Blessed & Cursed
12	Winterfylleth	The Mercian Sphere
13	Canvas Solaris	Irradiance
13	Hell Within	God Grant Me Vengeance
13	Hellyeah	Stampede
13	In This Moment	A Star-Crossed Wasteland
13	Korn	Korn III – Remember Who You Are
16	Darkseed	Poison Awaits
19	The Eyes of a Traitor	Breathless
20	The Acacia Strain	Wormwood
20	Chimaira	Coming Alive (DVD/CD)
20	Early Man	Death Potion
20	Impending Doom	There Will Be Violence
20	Lillian Axe	Deep Red Shadows
20	Mose Giganticus	Gift Horse
20	Valdur	Raven God Amongst Us
26	36 Crazyfists	Collisions and Castaways
27	Avenged Sevenfold	Nightmare
27	Decrepit Birth	Polarity
27	The Rotted	Anarchogram (EP)
29	Darkane	Layers of Live (DVD)
30	Blind Guardian	At the Edge of Time

=== August ===
Day	Artist	Album
3	Paul Gilbert	Fuzz Universe
3	Dax Riggs	Say Goodnight To The World
3	All Out War	Into the Killing Fields
5	Wacken Open Air	Wacken Open Air 2009 (DVD)
6	Immortal	The Seventh Date of Blashyrkh (DVD)
10	The Binary Code	Priest (EP)
10	Bonded by Blood	Exiled to Earth
10	Black Label Society	Order of the Black
10	Crash	The Paragon of Animals
16	Iron Maiden	The Final Frontier
17	Knights of the Abyss	The Culling of Wolves
17	Miss May I	Monument
18	Satanic Warmaster	Nachzehrer
20	Kataklysm	Heaven's Venom
20	Toxik	Think Again (DVD)
20	Tarja Turunen	What Lies Beneath
21	SIC	Fighters They Bleed
23	Apocalyptica	7th Symphony
24	The Devil Wears Prada	Zombie (EP)
24	Ion Dissonance	Cursed
24	Malevolent Creation	Invidious Dominion
24	Shadows Fall	Madness in Manila: Shadows Fall Live in the Philippines 2009 (DVD)
24	The Showdown	Blood in the Gears
24	The Sword	Warp Riders
25	Tristania	Rubicon
25	Sonic Syndicate	We Rule the Night
27	Liv Kristine	Skintight
30	Dagoba	Poseidon
30	Mar De Grises	Streams Inwards
30	Neurosis	Live at Roadburn 2007 (DVD)
30	Nightfall	Astron Black and the Thirty Tyrants
30	Sahg	Sahg III
30	Spiritual Beggars	Return to Zero
30	Terror	Keepers of the Faith
31	10 Years	Feeding the Wolves
31	The Autumn Offering	The Autumn Offering
31	Cephalic Carnage	Misled by Certainty
31	Disturbed	Asylum
31	Murderdolls	Women and Children Last
31	For Today	Breaker
31	The Word Alive	Deceiver

=== September ===
Day	Artist	Album
1	Acid Drinkers	Fishdick Zwei – The Dick Is Rising Again (cover album)
1	Atrocity	After the Storm
3	Death Angel	Relentless Retribution
3	The Red Shore	The Avarice of Man
7	Helmet	Seeing Eye Dog
7	Megadeth	Rust in Peace Live (DVD)
7	Stone Sour	Audio Secrecy
7	Suicidal Tendencies	No Mercy Fool!/The Suicidal Family
9	Marseille	Unfinished Business
10	Swashbuckle	Crime Always Pays...
10	Kamelot	Poetry for the Poisoned
10	Volbeat	Beyond Hell/Above Heaven
13	Autopsy	The Tomb Within (EP)
13	DragonForce	Twilight Dementia (live album)
14	The Absence	Enemy Unbound
14	Accept	Blood of the Nations
14	Beneath the Massacre	Marée Noire (EP)
14	Flotsam and Jetsam	The Cold
14	Lordi	Babez for Breakfast
14	Sully Erna	Avalon
14	System Divide	The Conscious Sedation
17	Elvenking	Red Silent Tides
17	Secret Sphere	Archetype
17	Therion	Sitra Ahra
20	Drudkh	Handful of Stars
20	Manticora	Safe
20	Metallica	Six Feet Down Under (EP)
20	Raunchy	A Discord Electric
21	Opeth	In Live Concert at the Royal Albert Hall (live DVD)
21	Serj Tankian	Imperfect Harmonies
21	Torche	Songs for Singles (EP)
24	Circle II Circle	Consequence of Power
24	Dimmu Borgir	Abrahadabra
24	Exciter	Death Machine
24	Revolution Renaissance	Trinity
27	Cataract	Killing The Eternal
27	The Crown	Doomsday King
27	Enslaved	Axioma Ethica Odini
28	Abigail Williams	In the Absence of Light
28	August Burns Red	Home (live DVD/CD)
28	Avian	The Path (EP)
28	Alice Cooper	Theatre of Death: Live At Hammersmith 2009 (DVD)
28	Halford	Halford IV: Made of Metal
28	James LaBrie	Static Impulse
28	Mushroomhead	Beautiful Stories for Ugly Children
28	October Tide	A Thin Shell
28	Powerglove	Saturday Morning Apocalypse
28	Slipknot	(sic)nesses (live DVD)
28	Unearthly Trance	V
29	Angra	Aqua
29	Iron Fire	Metalmorphosized
30	Place of Skulls	As A Dog Returns

=== October ===
Day	Artist	Album
1	Grave Digger	The Clans Will Rise Again
1	Melechesh	The Epigenesis
4	Bring Me the Horizon	There Is a Hell Believe Me I've Seen It. There Is a Heaven Let's Keep It a Secret.
5	Joe Satriani	Black Swans and Wormhole Wizards
8	Alter Bridge	AB III
10	Mortiis	Perfectly Defect
12	All That Remains	For We Are Many
12	Dakrya	Crime Scene
12	Intronaut	Valley of Smoke
12	Madball	Empire
12	Motionless in White	Creatures
12	Negligence	Coordinates of Confusion
15	All Ends	A Road To Depression
15	Magic Kingdom	Symphony of War
15	Mirror of Deception	A Smouldering Fire
15	Rhapsody of Fire	The Cold Embrace of Fear – A Dark Romantic Symphony
15	Symphorce	Unrestricted
17	Crionics	N.O.I.R. (EP)
18	The Meads of Asphodel	The Murder of Jesus The Jew
18	Ghost	Opus Eponymous
20	Amberian Dawn	End of Eden
20	Arckanum	Sviga Læ
22	Cradle of Filth	Darkly Darkly Venus Aversa
22	Forbidden	Omega Wave
22	Neaera	Forging the Eclipse
22	Virgin Steele	The Black Light Bacchanalia
25	Helheim	Åsgards Fall (EP)
25	Tank	War Machine
25	Triptykon	Shatter (EP)
26	Agathocles	This is Not a Threat, It's a Promise
26	Dååth	Dååth
26	Firewind	Days of Defiance
26	Ill Niño	Dead New World
26	Krieg	The Isolationist
26	Kylesa	Spiral Shadow
26	Monster Magnet	Mastermind
26	Sacred Oath	World on Fire
26	Slough Feg	The Animal Spirits
26	Star One	Victims of the Modern Age
26	Withered	Dualitas
26	Diskreet	Engage the Mechanicality
27	Verjnuarmu	Lohuton
29	Heljareyga	Heljareyga
29	The Sorrow	The Sorrow
29	War from a Harlots Mouth	MMX
29	Angband	Visions of the Seeker
30	Shape of Despair	Written in My Scars (EP)
31	Helloween	7 Sinners

=== November ===
Day	Artist	Album
1	Ross the Boss	Hailstorm
2	Anal Cunt	Wearing Out Our Welcome
2	Escape the Fate	Escape the Fate
3	Machinae Supremacy	A View from the End of the World
5	Allen/Lande	The Showdown
5	Forgotten Tales	We Shall See the Light
8	Aborym	Psychogrotesque
8	Atheist	Jupiter
8	Deathspell Omega	Paracletus
8	Therapy?	We're Here to the End
9	Am I Blood	Existence of Trauma
9	Behemoth	Evangelia Heretika (DVD)
9	First Blood	Silence Is Betrayal
9	Gwar	Bloody Pit of Horror
9	Oceano	Contagion
9	Place of Skulls	As a Dog Returns
9	Sargeist	Let the Devil In
9	Underoath	Ø (Disambiguation)
9	Vreid	Vreid Goddamnit (DVD)
15	Hate	Erebos
15	Solefald	Norrøn Livskunst
19	Astral Doors	Testament of Rock – The Best of Astral Doors
19	The Ocean	Anthropocentric
19	Samael	Antigod (EP)
20	Impaled Nazarene	Road to the Octagon
22	Sodom	In War and Pieces
23	After the Burial	In Dreams
23	Agalloch	Marrow of the Spirit
23	The Chariot	Long Live
23	God Dethroned	Under the Sign of the Iron Cross
23	Yngwie Malmsteen	Relentless
23	Phobia	Unrelenting (EP)
24	Dark Moor	Ancestral Romance
24	Dark the Suns	Sleepwalking in a Nightmare
24	Teräsbetoni	Maailma Tarvitsee Sankareita
26	Metallica	Live at Grimey's (live EP)
30	Chapter 14	Like Trees in November (EP)

=== December ===
Day	Artist	Album
3	Seventh Wonder	The Great Escape
3	Theatres des Vampires	Moonlight Waltz
7	Death	Live in Japan (DVD)
7	Flyleaf	Remember to Live (EP)
14	Motörhead	The Wörld Is Yours
14	The Damned Things	Ironiclast
14	Sea of Treachery	Wonderland
17	Ektomorf	Redemption
17	Sinister	Legacy of Ashes
17	Tankard	Vol(l)ume 14
31	Helrunar	Sól

Preceded by 2009	Heavy Metal Timeline; 2010	Succeeded by 2011
