= Your God =

Your God may refer to:

- "Your God", song by Stone Sour from Come What(ever) May 2006
- "Your God", song by Behind the Sun (Dive album) 2004
- "Your God", song by Low Twelve 2006
- "Your God", song by Project Pitchfork from Dream, Tiresias! 2009
- "Your God", song by Thom Donovan 2013
- "Your God", song by Jonathan Davis from Black Labyrinth 2018
