= Wounds (album) =

Studio album by The Funeral Pyre
- Released: May 27, 2008
- Recorded: January – February 2008
- Genre: Blackened death metal Melodic black metal Melodic death metal
- Length: 50:15
- Label: Prosthetic Records
- Producer: John Haddad

The Funeral Pyre chronology
The Nature of Betrayal (2006/2007)	Wounds (2008)	Vultures at Dawn (2010)

Professional ratings
Review scores
Source	Rating
AllMusic	3.5/5 stars

Wounds is the third full-length release by American blackened death metal band The Funeral Pyre. It was released on May 27, 2008.

Unlike their earlier works, this album features no keyboards, instead replacing long-time keyboard player Daniella Jones with guitarist Justin Garcia. According to the band's official webpage, "We did 2 records with keyboards. We loved doing those records with keyboards. Things eventually started to not work out between both parties." However, near the end of their first tour of this album, Garcia, too, left the band and was replaced by Lanny Perelman, formerly a member of Cerberus.

The musical qualities are different from their first two albums. Many of the death metal elements were removed from this album and has been considered a loss for the band. However, the band's work on Wounds was praised for the songwriting and musicianship value of the album.

Guest vocals on the title track, "Wounds", were provided by Makh Daniels of the band Early Graves.

== Track listing ==
No.	Title	Length
1.	"Thieves"	6:04
2.	"Black Earth"	4:02
3.	"The Gathering Bones"	5:02
4.	"Wounds"	8:41
5.	"These Ties That Bind"	4:12
6.	"Arches Of Existence"	5:44
7.	"When The Light Ends"	4:48
8.	"Devourer"	4:43
9.	"Ghost Walker"	6:59

== Personnel ==
- James Joyce - guitar
- Justin Garcia - guitar
- Alex Hernandez - drums
- John Strachan - vocals
- Adam Campbell - bass guitar
