= Shadowheart (disambiguation) =

Shadowheart is a character in the 2023 video game Baldur's Gate 3.

Shadowheart may also refer to:

- Shadowheart (album), a 2008 album by Kivimetsän Druidi
- The Shadow Heart, a 2012 audio drama based on the Doctor Who series

== See also ==
- Shadows of the Heart, a 1990 Australian television mini-series
