= Monumento =

Monumento may refer to:

- Monumento (album), a 2008 album by Dakrya
- "Monumento", a 2018 song by Kyla from The Queen of R&B
- Monumento, a district in Caloocan, Philippines where the Bonifacio Monument is located
  - Monumento LRT station, Manila LRT station serving the said area

== See also ==
Monumento means monument in Portuguese, Spanish, and Filipino. For relevant articles in Wikipedia see:

- Monuments of Portugal
- Monument (Spain)
