= Metal Injection =

American heavy metal website

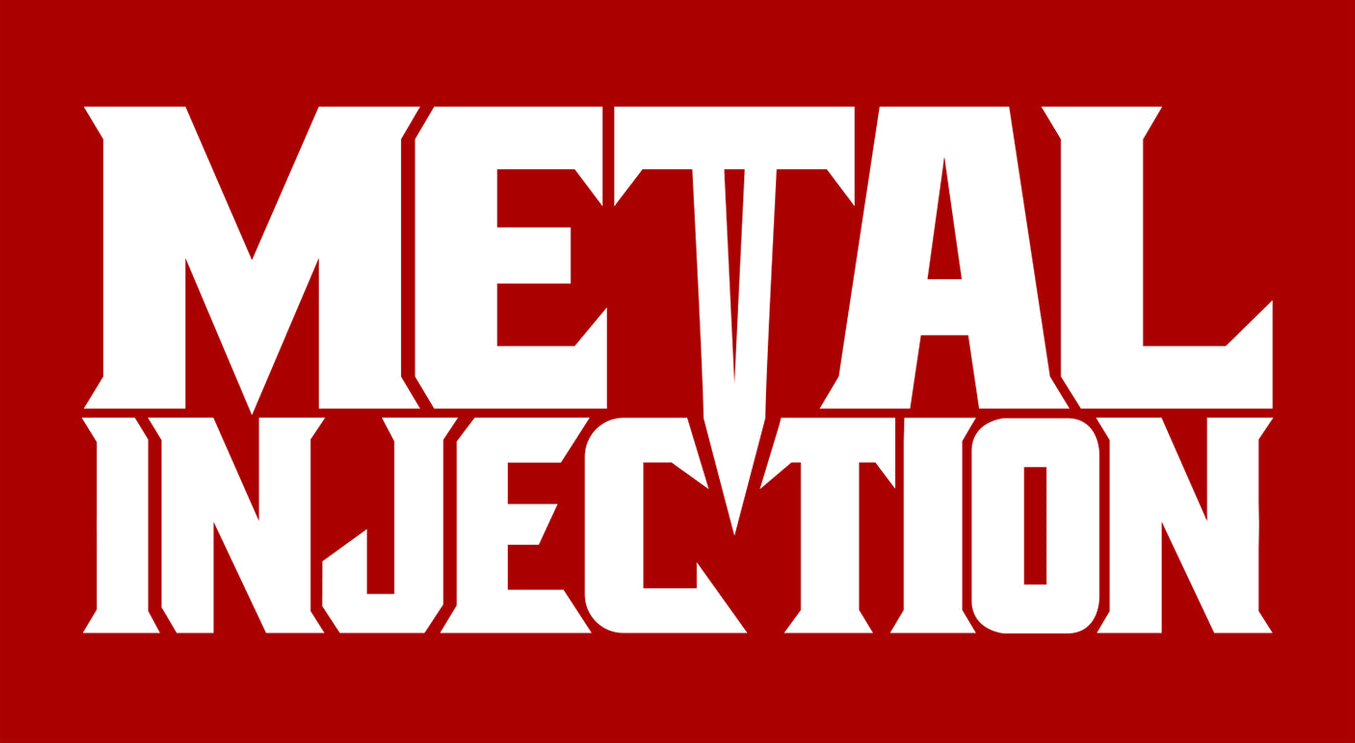
- Website type: Online music magazine Music, news and media
- Available in: English, Italian, French, Russian, Spanish
- Founded: 2003; 23 years ago
- Country of origin: United States
- Owner: The Orchard
- Founders: Frank Godla; Robert Pasbani
- Editor: Greg Kennelty
- CEO: Frank Godla
- Website: metalinjection.net
- Commercial: Yes
- Registration: No
- Launched: January 1, 2004; 22 years ago

Metal Injection is an American online music publication focusing on hard rock and heavy metal. It was founded in 2003 by Frank Godla and Robert Pasbani in Brooklyn, and officially launched on January 1, 2004. It was initially established as a public-access TV show, but quickly transitioned to online video interviews and content. Since 2022, the site has been owned by The Orchard, a subsidiary of Sony Music.

== History ==
=== 2003–2005: Formation and launch ===
Metal Injection was established in 2003 by Frank Godla and Robert Pasbani in Brooklyn, New York. Pasbani got into rock music through watching wrestling, and majored in TV & Radio production. Both had known each other in high school but did not reconnect until many years later, when Pasbani accompanied a friend to a job interview at a telecommunications company Godla worked at. Pasbani later approached Godla with the idea of establishing a public access TV show focusing on heavy metal, and the two formed a partnership. Pasbani came up with the name Metal Injection. "I just tried to come up with a name that had the term 'metal' in it and sounded cool, and including 'Injection' evoked so much imagery that I thought it would be perfect."

Metal Injection was officially launched on January 1, 2004. The TV show originally aired on Saturdays at 3:00 am, whilst its website was originally a news site. The programme featured music videos, live footage from VHS tapes, and some skits between videos. A few weeks after its launch, Godla and Pasbani decided to move the Metal Injection show online and began uploading the full 30-minute episodes to the website after realising its "reach on the Internet was far greater than a local public access channel", according to Pasbani. Metal Injection soon stopped publishing episodes and began focusing on uploading clips instead.

=== 2006–2021: Continued growth and expansion ===
In January 2007, over 30 hours of archival footage was uploaded to Metal Injection "Video Vault" for a limited time. In April 2008, the site was relaunched featuring a new forum and gallery, alongside the ability for users to upload their own videos onto the site. The site's user community was affectionately known as "junkies". In 2010, six years after its launch, Metal Injection finally became a profitable operation, allowing Godla and Pasbani to quit their daytime jobs to focus solely on running the website. By 2012, the site had developed its own 24 hour radio network, Metalinjection.fm, and expanded into audio podcasts (such as the weekly Metal Injection Livecast) and had an iPhone application.

In 2008, Metal Injection launched the New England Metal Fest TV series to provide coverage of the 2008 New England Metal and Hardcore Festival. In 2012, Metal Injection partnered with fellow heavy metal blog MetalSucks to hold a CMJ showcase featuring Pig Destroyer, KEN Mode, Early Graves, and Encrust. From April 2012 until May 2015, Metal Injection produced the On the Record series, which focused on the impact of the internet on heavy metal music and culture. In May 2016, the site launched the "Taste of Metal" series with chef Brian Tsao, in which featured artists prepared meals inspired by their music. In 2017, Metal Injection partnered with MetalSucks to launch the advertising network Blast Beat Network.

Between 2020 and 2021, Frank Godla organized the monthly Slay at Home "virtual music and art festival" series amidst the COVID-19 pandemic. The first edition of the festival took place between May 29 and 30, 2020, and was livestreamed on the Metal Injection YouTube channel. A second edition of Slay at Home was held in December 2020, and its third and final took place in June 2021.

=== 2022–present: The Orchard acquisition ===
In 2022, Metal Injection was acquired by The Orchard, a subsidiary of Sony Music

In 2023, Metal Injection held the first-ever Metal Injection Festival, which took place between September 16–17, 2023, at the House of Blues in Anaheim, California.

In June 2024, Metal Injection launched their own Pilsner brand, Neck Breaker, in collaboration with Thin Man Brewery.

== Recognition ==
In 2012, Metal Injection won the "Beyond the Blog" award at the MTV O Music Awards. LA Weekly listed it as one of the ten best "Online Resources for Metal Knowledge" in 2013.

== See also ==
- MetalSucks
- Invisible Oranges
