= Crime Scene =

A crime scene is a location where a crime took place.

Crime Scene may also refer to:

- Crime Scene (Dakrya album), 2010
- Crime Scene (Terje Rypdal album), 2009
- Crime Scene (American TV program), a crime investigation program broadcast by Fox News and hosted by Greta Van Susteren
- Crime Scene (South Korean TV series), a South Korean TV series
- Tatort (English title: Crime Scene), a long-running German/Austrian/Swiss crime television series
- Crime Scene (video game), an adventure game for the Nintendo DS
- Crime Scene (website), established in 1995
- "The Crime Scene", an episode of the sixth season of Brooklyn Nine-Nine
- Crime Scene (docuseries), a Netflix docuseries directed by Joe Berlinger
- Famous Crime Scene, a crime program by VH1

== See also ==
- Scene of the Crime (disambiguation)
