= Despise =

Despise (adjective form: despicable) means to regard with contempt or scorn.

Despise or Despicable may also refer to:

- "Despicable" (song), a 2010 freestyle by Eminem
- Despicable (EP), a 2020 EP by death metal band Carcass
- "Despise" (Slipknot song), a 1999 song by metal band Slipknot

== See also ==
- Despised (Seaweed (band) album)
