= Threnody (disambiguation) =

Threnody is a song, hymn or poem of mourning composed or performed as a memorial to a dead person.

Threnody may also refer to:

- Threnody (character), a fictional character created by Marvel Comics for the X-Men series
- Threnody (Engel album), 2010
- Threnody (Frida song), 1982 single
- Threnody (short), a 2002 short dance-film reflection on September 11 by Vincent Paterson
- Threnody (Woe of Tyrants album), 2010
- Threnody Ensemble, an experimental classical music group
- Threnody to the Victims of Hiroshima, a 1960 musical composition by Krzysztof Penderecki
- a poem by Ralph Waldo Emerson
- the setting of Brandon Sanderson's novella "Shadows for Silence in the Forests of Hell"
