= A Clear Perception =

Studio album by The Eyes of a Traitor
- Released: 23 February 2009
- Recorded: @ EAS Studios, Milton Keynes
- Genres: Metalcore, melodic death metal, melodic hardcore
- Length: 40:50
- Labels: Listenable Records; Doom Patrol
- Producer: Ed Sokolowski

The Eyes of a Traitor chronology
By Sunset (2008)	A Clear Perception (2009)	Breathless (2010)

Professional ratings
Review scores
Source	Rating
About.com	3/5 stars
metalreview	(6.9/10)
Sputnikmusic	4/5 stars

A Clear Perception is the debut album by British metalcore band The Eyes of a Traitor. The album was released in Europe on Listenable Records in Europe on 23 February and then in United States on 10 March.

The album was originally scheduled to be released on 2 February through the independent distributor, Pinnacle Distribution however because of the 2008 financial crisis, the company was forced to go into administration, as of 3 December 2008. Warner Brothers took control of distribution.

On 18 September 2010, The Eyes of a Traitor announced that they were planning to release an Extended play consisting of 4 re-recorded tracks from the debut album. The four tracks were confirmed to be: Under Siege, Escape These Walls, Like Clockwork and The Impact of Two Hearts. It was originally announced to be released around Christmas time but was delayed indefinitely. Justin Lowe, the guitarist of metalcore band After the burial mixed the tracks while Ed Sokolowski produced them. Progress on the completion on the EP was hindered because of After the Burial touring with As I Lay Dying.

== Track listing ==
No.	Title	Length
1.	"Under Siege"	4:13
2.	"Like Clockwork"	4:27
3.	"With Different Eyes"	3:52
4.	"Escape These Walls"	4:00
5.	"Decorus"	4:36
6.	"Misconceptions"	4:02
7.	"Echoes"	4:18
8.	"Hands of Time"	5:31
9.	"The Impact of Two Hearts"	3:38
10.	"A Clear Perception"	1:56

== Release history ==
Country	Date	Label	Format	Catalog number	Source
Europe	23 February 2009	Listenable Records	CD	Posh 111	
United States	10 March 2009	Listenable Records	CD	Posh 111	
Japan	28 July 2010	Doom Patrol	CD	PTRL-0009	

== Personnel ==
The Eyes of a Traitor

- Jack Delany – vocals
- Stephen Whitworth – guitars
- Matthew Pugh – guitars
- Paul Waudby – bass
- Sam Brennan – drums

Additional Personnel

- Produced by Ed Sokolowski
- Equipment by Norbert Achtelik
- Management by Laurent Merle
- Design by Lee Boyce
