= October (EP) =

EP by The Funeral Pyre
- Released: 2003
- Genre: Blackened death metal Melodic death metal Melodic black metal
- Length: 17:57
- Label: Self released

The Funeral Pyre chronology
Whispering to the Shadows (2002)	October (2003)	Immersed by the Flames of Mankind (2004)

Alternative Cover

October (also called My Final Autumn) is a 2003 EP released by The Funeral Pyre. It was shortly before this album was recorded and released that the band decided to change its name from 'Envilent' to 'The Funeral Pyre'.

Though only a few reviews were made, it was praised for its work, despite being mostly a demo. Although it was said that "there is not much here that can make it stand apart," many said its piano intro and Spanish guitar outro were a very good build on the album. It was also said that it was recorded in only two days.

Only two of the songs from this album, "A Gradual Awakening" and "Isengard Unleashed", were available for download from the band's then official site. All the songs on this EP were re-recorded for their first full-length release, Immersed by the Flames of Mankind.

== Track listing ==
1. "A Gradual Awakening"
2. "World of Vengeance"
3. "Isengard Unleashed"

== Personnel ==
- Jason Dunn – guitar
- James Joyce – guitar
- John Strachan – vocals
- Alex Hernandez – drums
- Adam Campbell – bass guitar
