= Silent Chaos Serpentine =

Studio album by Stigmata
- Released: 13 January 2006
- Genre: Hard rock, heavy metal
- Length: 43:00
- Label: Indie

Stigmata chronology
Hollow Dreams (2003)	Silent Chaos Serpentine (2006)	Psalms of Conscious Martyrdom (2010)

Singles from Silent Chaos Serpentine
- 1. "Lucid (Acoustic)" Released: 2005; 2. "Solitude" Released: 2006; 3. "My Malice" Released: 2007

Professional ratings
Review scores
Source	Rating
The Metal Reporter	6.5/10 stars
The Metal Forge	7.5/10 stars
Sunday Times	
Media Slayer Productions	Positive

Silent Chaos Serpentine is the second studio album by Sri Lanka–based heavy metal band, Stigmata. The album was released in January 2006. The Album Current was on Australian metal site www.themetalforge.com's top 50 reviews of all time for over a year and was positioned at no.9. The Album was also nominated for an Album of the Year on the site tmetal.com

== Track listing ==
1. "Swinemaker" – 4:31
2. "Forgiven, Forgotten" – 5:51
3. "Jazz Theory" – 6:38
4. "Lucid" – 5:09
5. "My Malice" – 3:39
6. "Wingless" – 5:18
7. "Solitude" – 5:32
8. "Book of Skin" – 6:28

== Personnel ==
- Suresh De Silva
- Andrew Obeysekara
- Tennyson Napoleon
- Wije Dhas
- Ranil Senarath
