= Immersed by the Flames of Mankind =

Studio album by the Funeral Pyre
- Released: November 1, 2004
- Genre: Melodic death metal
- Length: 49:27
- Label: Self released

The Funeral Pyre chronology
October (2003)	Immersed by the Flames of Mankind (2004)	The Nature of Betrayal (2006/2007)

Immersed in the Flames of Mankind is an independently released, full-length album by the band the Funeral Pyre. This is a follow-up to the EP, October.

Despite being a self-recorded album, the sound quality was perceived as very professional, for an unsigned and unsupported band. It has been praised for its use of blast beats and the distinction of its keyboard. All the artwork is credited to Tony Koehl.

All three of the tracks from their previous EP, October, "A Gradual Awakening", "World of Vengeance" and "Isengard Unleashed", had been rerecorded for this album.

== Track listing ==
No.	Title	Length
1.	"The Wrath"	4:40
2.	"World of Vengeance"	5:45
3.	"Sight Through Bleeding Eyes"	4:32
4.	"Lies of Eternity"	4:29
5.	"A Fallacy Carved in Stone"	5:24
6.	"A Gradual Awakening"	6:52
7.	"Immersed by the Flames of Mankind"	6:35
8.	"Isengard Unleashed"	11:10

== Personnel ==
- Adam Campbell – bass guitar
- Daniella Jones – keyboards
- James Joyce – guitar
- Alex Hernandez – drums
- Jason Dunn – guitar
- John Strachan – vocals
