= Whispering to the Shadows =

EP by Envilent
- Released: 2002
- Genre: Blackened death metal Melodic death metal Melodic black metal
- Label: Self released

Envilent chronology
Whispering to the Shadows (2002)	October (2003)

Whispering to the Shadows is a 2002 EP by the band Envilent, now known as The Funeral Pyre.

Unlike most of their later albums, Whispering to the Shadows had a much more black metal feel to it. Apparently, during a show for one of this album's promotional shows, the owner of the venue stopped the show, because it had become too violent.

This album was only a "bedroom recording" according to John Strachan.

== Track listing ==
No.	Title	Length
1.	"Remain"	5:07
2.	"Whispering to the Shadows"	5:04
3.	"A Moment's Light"	5:59
4.	"Passing Night"	3:08
5.	"Crypts of the Eternal Death"	5:09

== Personnel ==
- Alex Hernandez - drums
- Adam Campbell - bass guitar
- James Joyce - guitar
- Jason Dunn - guitar
- John Strachan - vocals
