= The Nature of Betrayal =

The Nature Of Betrayal

Studio album by The Funeral Pyre
- Released: September 12, 2006; March 20, 2007 (Re-release)
- Genre: Blackened death metal Melodic black metal Melodic death metal
- Length: 43:02
- Label: Creator Destructor Records, Prosthetic Records (Re-release)

The Funeral Pyre chronology
Immersed by the Flames of Mankind (2004)	The Nature Of Betrayal (2006)	Wounds (2008)

Professional ratings
Review scores
Source	Rating
AllMusic	4/5 stars
Blabbermouth	6.5/10 stars

The Nature Of Betrayal is the second album release by the band The Funeral Pyre.

Originally released by Creator Destructor Records, a Bay Area label, it had seen great success during its debut in late 2006. Despite being unsigned at the particular time, the band had scheduled over 100 shows in the Bay area alone, and was praised for the mood that they could convey using both aggressive death/black metal sounds, and the harmonies of a keyboard. It was also praised for its sound and songwriting, despite the band's young age.

This album has been heavily praised for its fuse of both black metal and death metal and the atmosphere created by keyboardist Daniella Jones' synthesizers, and drummer Alex Hernandez's use of blast beats throughout the album.

The album was re-released in March 2007 with a distribution deal by Prosthetic Records after 5 weeks of constant touring.

The artwork for this record "was created by Gustave Doré."

== Track listing ==
No.	Title	Length
1.	"200 Years"	5:33
2.	"In the Wake"	4:59
3.	"Here the Sun Never Shines"	4:31
4.	"The Nature of Betrayal"	5:47
5.	"Plague that Leads to Extinction"	4:43
6.	"Victims"	5:42
7.	"Stealing the Air of Life"	7:15
8.	"Ending the Eternal Reign"	4:33

== Personnel ==
- James Joyce - all guitars
- Adam Campbell - bass guitar
- Alex Hernandez - drums
- Daniella Jones - keyboards
- John Strachan - vocals
