= Scene of the Crime =

Scene of the Crime may refer to:

== Films ==
- Scene of the Crime (1949 film), starring Van Johnson
- Scene of the Crime (1986 film), a French film directed by André Téchiné
- Scene of the Crime (1996 film), also known as Ladykiller
- Scenes of the Crime, a 2001 film directed by Dominique Forma

== Television ==
- Scene of the Crime (1984 TV series), a 1984-1985 series of one-hour NBC mystery specials hosted by Orson Welles
- Scene of the Crime (TV series), a 1991-1992 U.S. television mystery anthology series broadcast on CBS
- S.O.C.O. (Scene of the Crime Operatives), a Philippine reality series

== Other uses ==
- Crime Scene (disambiguation)
- The Scene of the Crime, a 2007 album by Bettye LaVette
- "Scene of the Crime", a song by the band Ratt
- Scene of the Crime (comics), limited series comic book published by DC Comics
- Scene of the Crime Operations, the forensic arm of the Philippine National Police
- "The Scene of the Crime", a 1990 song by Jo-El Sonnier
- Scene of the Crime, a 1986 prototype video game for the Control-Vision which inspired the 1992 video game Night Trap
