= Wolves and Witches =

Studio album by Magica
- Released: November 28, 2008
- Genre: Symphonic metal, power metal, gothic metal
- Length: 51:00
- Label: AFM Records

Magica chronology
Hereafter (2007)	Wolves and Witches (2008)	Dark Diary (2010)

Wolves and Witches is the Romanian Power metal band Magica's fourth studio album, released on November 28, 2008, by AFM Records. There are still no official videos for the songs on this CD; however, there is a fan-made video for the album's first song Don't Wanna Kill, which can be viewed at Magica's Myspace.com profile.

== Label's short review ==
"The young Romanian band MAGICA have already found their own sound and know exactly what they do. Call it Symphonic-, Power,- Gothic- or Melodic Metal: fans of Nightwish, Edenbridge and After Forever will find another favourite band in MAGICA."

== Track listing ==
1. "Don't Wanna Kill" - 4:59
2. "They Stole the Sun" - 5:01
3. "Hold On Tight" - 5:42
4. "Hurry Up Ravens" - 4:50
5. "Maiastra" - 2:36
6. "Dark Secret" - 4:21
7. "Just for 2 Coins" - 5:05
8. "Until the Light Is Gone" - 5:09
9. "Chitaroptera" - 2:53
10. "Mistress of the Wind " - 5:00
11. "In The Depths of the Lake (Bonus Track)"
