= The Scroll of Stone =

Studio album by Magica
- Released: 2002
- Genre: Power metal Symphonic metal Gothic metal
- Length: 45:39
- Label: Sigma Records

Magica chronology
The Scroll of Stone (2002)	Lightseeker (2004)

Alternative cover
- Romanian Edition Artwork

The Scroll of Stone is the debut album of the Romanian power metal band Magica. It was released in 2002. The album is about a princess named Alma who is tricked by a demon, she loses her soul, and so her quest begins. She has to find the scroll of stone, the only thing powerful enough to break the demon's spell.

== Track listing ==
1. "The Wish" - 0:54
2. "A Blood Red Dream" - 4:31
3. "The Sun Is Gone" - 1:05
4. "The Sorcerer" - 4:43
5. "Road to the Unknown" - 4:40
6. "Daca" - 3:56
7. "E Magic" - 3:50
8. "The Silent Forest" - 4:26
9. "Mountains of Ice" - 5:05
10. "The Key" - 2:33
11. "The Scroll of Stone" - 4:31
12. "Redemption" - 5:10
