= Kingdom of Might =

Studio album by Woe of Tyrants
- Released: January 6, 2009
- Recorded: May 2008 – June 2008
- Genre: Death metal, thrash metal
- Length: 41:34
- Label: Metal Blade
- Producer: Joey Sturgis

Woe of Tyrants chronology
Behold the Lion (2007)	Kingdom of Might (2009)	Threnody (2010)

Professional ratings
Review scores
Source	Rating
Allmusic	3.5/5 stars

Kingdom of Might is the second album by American death metal band Woe of Tyrants. Released on January 6, 2009, it marked the band's debut on Metal Blade Records. It was produced by the band and Joey Sturgis.

== Track listing ==
1. "Jesu Juva" – 0:55
2. "Soli Deo Gloria" – 5:06
3. "Break the Fangs of the Wicked" – 4:14
4. "Pearls Before Swine" – 3:37
5. "Kingdom of Might (The Eclipse)" – 4:16
6. "Kingdom of Might (Dawn in the Darkness)" – 4:23
7. "Sounding Jerusalem" – 3:41
8. "Sons of Thunder" – 3:12
9. "The Seven Braids of Samson" – 4:07
10. "Like Jasper and Carnelian" – 4:34
11. "Golgotha" – 3:29

=== Recording band members ===
- Chris Catanzaro – vocals
- Chris Burns- guitar
- Matt Kincaid – guitar
- Adam Kohler – bass
- Johnny Roberts – drums
