= The New Dark Age =

Studio album by Kiuas
- Released: 12 March 2008
- Recorded: October 2007 – January 2008
- Studio: Sonic Pump Studios, Helsinki
- Genre: Power metal
- Length: 51:30
- Label: Spinefarm
- Producer: Nino Laurenne, Mikko Salovaara, Janne Joutsenniemi

Kiuas chronology
Reformation (2006)	The New Dark Age (2008)	Lustdriven (2010)

Singles from The New Dark Age
- 1. "Of Sacrifice, Loss and Reward" Released: 20 February 2008 (Finland)

Professional ratings
Review scores
Source	Rating
AllMusic	3.5/5 stars

The New Dark Age is the third studio album by the Finnish heavy metal band Kiuas. The album was released through Spinefarm Records on 12 March 2008 for Finland with new dates to be announced for other areas. The song "Conqueror", directed by Owe Lingwall, was shot as a music video on 18 February 2008. "Of Sacrifice, Loss and Reward" was released on 20 February as a single in Finland and topped the Finnish charts at number 1. The single will include two other songs and a Japanese bonus track exclusively to the single and Japan only. The album cover was designed by Niklas Sundin of Cabin Fever Media, and guitarist for Dark Tranquillity. It is of an original renaissance woodcut illustration with the portrayal of Kiuas' band members as the "five" Horsemen of the Apocalypse. A second music video for "The Decaying Doctrine" was again directed by Owe Lingwall.

== Track listing ==
All songs written by Mikko Salovaara, except where noted.

1. "The Decaying Doctrine" – 4:55
2. "Conqueror" – 5:06
3. "Kiuas War Anthem" – 4:36 (Ilja Jalkanen, Salovaara)
4. "The New Dark Age" – 5:03
5. "To Excel and Ascend" – 5:55
6. "Black Rose Withered" – 3:50
7. "After the Storm" – 5:40 (Jalkanen, Salovaara)
8. "Of Sacrifice, Loss and Reward" – 4:42 (Jalkanen, Salovaara)
9. "The Summoning" – 4:58 (Jalkanen, Salovaara)
10. "The Wanderer's Lamentation" – 6:45
11. "Towards the Hidden Sanctum" (Japanese bonus track) – 5:25
12. "Electric Crown" (UK bonus track; Testament cover) (Chuck Billy, Eric Peterson, Alex Skolnick) – 5:23
13. "Sailing Ships" (UK bonus track; Whitesnake cover) (David Coverdale, Adrian Vandenberg) – 6:14

== Personnel ==
Kiuas

- Ilja Jalkanen – vocals, choir
- Mikko Salovaara – guitars, vocals, choir, narration
- Atte Tanskanen – keyboard, choir
- Teemu Tuominen – bass guitar
- Markku Näreneva – drums

Additional musicians

- "J", Aleksi Parviainen, Pasi Rantanen, Pekka Heino: choir
- Anna-Maija Jalkanen: additional vocals on track 7
- Jussi Reijonen: oud on tracks 5 and 10

Production

- Arranged by Kiuas
- Produced by Nino Laurenne, Mikko Salovaara and Janne Joutsenniemi
- Recorded and engineered by Nino Laurenne
- Mixed by Mikko Karmila
- Pro-Tools editing by Aksu Hanttu
- Mastered by Svante Forsback
