= Hollow Dreams =

Studio album by Stigmata
- Released: 2 October 2003
- Genre: Hard rock, heavy metal
- Length: 1:01:51
- Label: Rock Company

Stigmata chronology
| Morbid Indiscretion (2002) | Hollow Dreams (2003) | Silent Chaos Serpentine (2006) |

Singles from Hollow Dreams
- 1. "Voices" Released: 2000; 2. "Thicker than Blood" Released: 2002; 3. "The Dying Winter Sleeps" Released: 2002; 4. "Extinction" Released: 2003

Professional ratings
Review scores
| Source | Rating |
|---|---|
| The Metal Reporter | 5/10 stars |
| Sunday Observer | (Positive) |
| Sunday Times | (Positive) |

Hollow Dreams is the debut studio album by Sri Lanka–based heavy metal band, Stigmata. The album was released in 2003.

Another noteworthy factor is that this was the first heavy metal album released by a Sri Lankan band.

== Track listing ==
1. "Thicker than Blood" – 04:08
2. "Hollow Dreams" – 04:30
3. "Andura" – 06:31
4. "Stigmatized" – 11:19
5. "Voices" – 06:03
6. "Harvest of Sin" – 04:21
7. "The Dying Winter Sleeps" – 07:18
8. "Dezra" – 04:11
9. "Inspired" – 04:10
10. "Falling Away" – 05:19
11. "Extinction" – 03:56
