= Options of a Trapped Mind =

Options of A Trapped Mind

Studio album by Negligence
- Released: June 11th, 2007
- Recorded: 2005, at Negligence Sound Solutions Studios (now Dyz's Sonic Temple studios), Jesenice, Slovenia
- Genre: Thrash metal
- Length: 48:16
- Label: Rock It Up
- Producer: Negligence

Negligence chronology
Options of A Trapped Mind (2007)	Coordinates of Confusion (2010)

Professional ratings
Review scores
Source	Rating

Options of a Trapped Mind is the debut album by Slovenian Thrash metal band Negligence. It was self-released on June 11, 2007 and later re-released through Rock It Up Records.

== Background ==
The album features back then 16-year-old Alex on vocals. It was recorded, produced, mixed and mastered by the band throughout 2006. The group held no official tour to support the album but still played numerous concerts in Slovenia and the neighbouring countries, including the Thrash Assault 3 festival in Würzburg with Heathen, Sadus and Devastation. A video was released for the song Warmachine, which received a modest airplay on MTV.

== Track listing ==
No.	Title	Length
1.	"Places Of Dawn"	04:19
2.	"War Machine"	04:42
3.	"Passage to..."	01:32
4.	"Threshold Of Society"	05:04
5.	"Bay Arena"	06:19
6.	"No Brain, No Pain"	04:54
7.	"Legacy Of Lies"	05:25
8.	"Options Of A Trapped Mind"	05:01
9.	"Fight Back"	05:27
10.	"Thrust"	05:33

== Personnel ==
Negligence

- Alex - lead vocals
- Jey - guitar
- Lipnik - bass guitar
- Ruzz - drums
- Dyz - guitar

Production

- Produced, Engineered and mastered by Negligence, Mixed by Ruzz.
