= The Disease EP =

EP by The Eyes of a Traitor
- Released: 16 September 2011
- Genre: Metalcore; melodic death metal
- Length: 16:11
- Producer: Sam Brennan

The Eyes of a Traitor chronology
Breathless (2010)	The Disease EP (2011)

The Disease EP is the second EP by British metalcore band The Eyes of a Traitor. It was released 16 September 2011 through distribution at live shows while touring the United Kingdom, the EP was limited to 200 copies. On 9 November 2011 the EP was made free by the band.

== Track listing ==
No.	Title	Length
1.	"Disease"	4:04
2.	"Into Dust"	4:01
3.	"Searching For Solace"	4:03
4.	"Thursday"	4:03
Total length:		16:11

== Personnel ==
- Jack Delany – vocals
- Matthew Pugh – guitars
- Tim George – guitars
- Jack Moulsdale – bass
- Sam Brennan – drums, percussion
