= Reformation (Kiuas album) =

Studio album by Kiuas
- Released: 24 May 2006
- Recorded: January–March 2006
- Studio: Sonic Pump Studios
- Genre: Power metal, melodic death metal
- Length: 43:57
- Label: Spinefarm
- Producer: Nino Laurenne, Aksu Hanttu, Ossi Tuomela

Kiuas chronology
The Spirit of Ukko (2005)	Reformation (2006)	The New Dark Age (2008)

Reformation is the second studio album by Finnish heavy metal band Kiuas. Released on 24 May 2006 by Spinefarm Records, some versions include a cover of Jethro Tull's "Hunting Girl".

== Track listing ==
1. "Race with the Falcons" − 4:47
2. "Through the Ice Age" − 3:58
3. "The New Chapter" − 4:25
4. "Of Ancient Wounds" − 3:33
5. "Child of Cimmeria" − 1:06
6. "Black Winged Goddess" − 5:21
7. "Heart of the Serpent" − 4:55
8. "Bleeding Strings" − 5:50
9. "Call of the Horns" − 3:39
10. "Reformation" − 6:12
11. "Hunting Girl" (Jethro Tull cover) (bonus track) − 5:09

== Personnel ==
=== Band members ===
- Ilja Jalkanen − vocals
- Mikko Salovaara − guitars
- Markku Näreneva − drums
- Atte Tanskanen − keyboards
- Teemu Tuominen − bass guitar

=== Guest musicians ===
Choirs by:

- Kimmo Blom
- Aleksi Parviainen
- Pete "Vessaharja" Aho

Musicians in individual songs:

- Niko Kalliojärvi − berzerker vocals on track 6
- Euge Valovirta − guest guitar solo on track 8
- Janne "Crab" Lehikoinen − guest guitar solo on track 8
- Jaana Ranta − flute on track 10
- Karoliina Tiuraniemi − violin on tracks 6 and 10
- Essi Toivonen − violin, cello on tracks 6 and 10
- Dr. Evil − black mass on track 10

=== Production and other ===
- All music and lyrics by Mikko Salovaara
- Cover art by Janne "ToxicAngel" Pitkänen
- Mixed by Nino Laurenne at Sonic Pump Studios March 2006
- Mastered by Mika Jussila at Finnvox Studios
