= Hereafter (album) =

Studio album by Magica
- Released: 5 November 2007
- Genre: Power metal Symphonic metal Gothic metal
- Length: 50:25
- Label: AFM Records

Magica chronology
Lightseeker (2004)	Hereafter (2007)	Wolves and Witches (2008)

Hereafter is the third album from the Romanian power metal band Magica. It was released in 2007. There is a video for the songs "All Waters Have the Colour of Drowning" and "Entangled".

== Track listing ==
1. "All Waters Have the Colour of Drowning" - 5:13
2. "Turn to Stone" - 5:19
3. "Through Wine" - 4:24
4. "No Matter What" - 4:35
5. "Entangled" - 4:36
6. "This Is Who I Am" - 4:45
7. "The Weight of the World" - 4:51
8. "Energy for the Gods" - 4:39
9. "Shallow Grave" - 4:13
10. "I Remember a Day" - 4:18
11. "Into Silence" - 3:27

=== Digipack bonus tracks ===
12. "Endless"
13. "Vrajitoarea Cea Rea"
