= The Spirit of Ukko =

Studio album by Kiuas
- Released: 4 May 2005
- Recorded: April–December 2004
- Studio: Studio Tauko
- Genre: Power metal; melodic death metal
- Length: 47:05
- Label: Spinefarm
- Producer: Kiuas and Yki Buckbee

Kiuas chronology
Winter in June (2004)	The Spirit of Ukko (2005)	Reformation (2006)

Professional ratings
Review scores
Source	Rating
Metal Storm	9.6/10
Vampire Magazine	(favorable)

The Spirit of Ukko is the debut studio album by the Finnish heavy metal band Kiuas, released on 4 May 2005 by Spinefarm Records. "Ukko" in Finnish mythology is the greatest of the pagan gods and is a Finnish male name. The Japanese version features a bonus song eponymously titled from the Winter in June EP. The third quarter piece of the song "Across the Snows" is sung in Finnish.

== Track listing ==
All music and lyrics by Mikko Salovaara, except "No More Sleep for Me" by Ilja Jalkanen.

1. "The Spirit of Ukko" − 5:52
2. "On Winds of Death We Ride" − 4:20
3. "No More Sleep for Me" − 4:06
4. "Warrior Soul" − 5:48
5. "Until We Reach the Shore" − 4:27
6. "Across the Snows" − 5:59
7. "Thorns of a Black Rose" − 4:49
8. "And the North Star Cried" − 6:59
9. "Winter in June" − 4:24 (Japanese edition bonus track)

== Credits ==
=== Band members ===
- Ilja Jalkanen − vocals
- Mikko Salovaara − guitars
- Markku Näreneva − drums
- Atte Tanskanen − keyboards
- Teemu Tuominen − bass

=== Guest musicians ===
- Strings on "And the North Star Cried" arranged by Mikko Salovaara and performed by the Arctic string quartet:
- Karo Tiuraniemi − violin
- Laura Airola − violin
- Suvi Oskala − viola
- Essi Toivonen − cello

=== Production and other ===
- Mixed by Nino Laurenne at Sonic Pump Studios
- Strings recorded at The Helsinki Pop & Jazz Conservatory by Juuso Kujala
- Mastered by Mika Jussila at Finnvox Studios
- Cover concept and photography by Harri Halme/Shadow Mechanics
- Cover illustrations and logos by Janne "ToxicAngel" Pitkänen
- Cover layout by Janne/Spinefarm
