= Death of Desire =

German metal band

- Origin: Bruchsal, Germany
- Genres: Black metal
- Years active: since 2008
- Labels: Sin Sello
- Members: Dawn Desirée Lord Azmodeus Hellhammer Lord Priapos
- Website: http://www.myspace.com/deathofdesireband

Death of Desire is a metal band formed in Bruchsal, Germany, in 2008, featuring Mayhem drummer Hellhammer and vocalist Dawn Desirée.

Their debut album ANTIhuman was recorded in Knut Magne Valle's Mølla Studio. Bandmember Morbid has said that the album will not be released until the band finds a suitable record company to release it through. Mayhem singer Attila Csihar will be a guest vocalist on the track "Inner Sanctum".

== Members ==
- Dawn Desirée – vocals
- Morbid – guitars
- Hellhammer – drums
- Pzy Clone – Synthesizers & Orchestras
- Attila Csihar – Guest Singer

== Discography ==
- ANTIhuman - (N/A-2012)
