= Breathless (The Eyes of a Traitor album) =

Studio album by The Eyes of a Traitor
- Released: 12 July 2010
- Recorded: February 2010 – March 2010, @ Outhouse Studios, Reading, Berkshire
- Genre: Metalcore
- Length: 38:13
- Label: Listenable; E1 (8 February 2011)
- Producer: John Mitchell

The Eyes of a Traitor chronology
A Clear Perception (2009)	Breathless (2010)	The Disease EP (2011)

Singles from Breathless
- 1. "Come To My Senses" Released: 29 June 2010

Professional ratings
Review scores
Source	Rating
Kerrang!	3/5 stars
Rockfreaks	(7.5/10)
Thrash Hits	5/6 stars

Breathless is the second and final studio album by British metal band The Eyes of a Traitor. It was released in Europe via Listenable Records on 12 July 2010 and in North America on 27 July. The album name is from the title track "Breathless" which was a single 9 months prior to the release of this record. Breathless was released in North America on 8 February via Entertainment 1.

== Release and promotion ==
The track "Nothing to Offer" was released as a digital, non-album single on 1 September 2009 which has been re-recorded for Breathless, as well with the title track Breathless was released as a demo version on their myspace on February 8. On the BBC Radio 1 The Rock Show 11 May 2010 show, Daniel. P.Carter played Come to my Senses, the proposed first single for this album. they have continued to promote the album by releasing the 6th track 'Talk of the town' on their Myspace on 10 June. the band commented that "the song is probably the heaviest tune on the new album. It was one of the first songs we've created for 'Breathless' and it was written in a day." The album was leaked on 11 July.

== Track listing ==
All lyrics are written by Jack Delany; all music is composed by Sam Brennan and The Eyes of a Traitor

No.	Title	Length
1.	"Prologue"	0:47
2.	"The Birth"	3:53
3.	"Come To My Senses"	4:26
4.	"The Real You"	3:35
5.	"Your Old Ways"	4:34
6.	"Talk Of The Town"	4:09
7.	"Nothing To Offer"	4:00
8.	"Breathless"	3:57
9.	"Crumble And Break"	4:06
10.	"Grounded"	4:49
Total length:		38:13

== Personnel ==
The Eyes Of a Traitor

- Jack Delany - lead vocals
- Matthew Pugh - guitars
- Tim George - guitars
- Jack Moulsdale - bass, co-lead vocals
- Sam Brennan - drums, guitars, bass, backing vocals

Production

- Produced & mixed by John Mitchell
- Engineered by Ben Humphreys & James Bilinge
- Management by Leander Gloversmith
- Publicity by Emma Van Duyts (Public City PR)
- Booking by Marco Walzel
- Artwork by Paul Jackson (Tank.Axe.Love)
- Photo by Alex Gregory
