= Shadowheart (album) =

Studio album by Kivimetsän Druidi
- Released: October 20, 2008
- Recorded: 2008
- Genre: Symphonic metal Folk metal
- Length: 53:02
- Label: Century Media
- Producer: Esa Orjatsalo

Kivimetsän Druidi chronology
Shadowheart (2008)	Betrayal, Justice, Revenge (2010)

Professional ratings
Review scores
Source	Rating
AMG	3/5 stars
Lords of Metal	8/10 stars
PyroMusic	6/10 stars
METALEATER	7/12 stars

Shadowheart is the debut album by Finnish symphonic/folk metal band Kivimetsän Druidi. It was released through Century Media on October 20, 2008.

== Track listing ==
- Tracks 1–11 Published By Magic Arts Publishing.
1. "Northwind - Prelude" - 1:29
2. "Blacksmith" - 6:01 (Jenni Onishko, Joni Koskinen, Antti Koskinen, Antti Rinkinen)
3. "Jäässä Varttunut" ("Grown Up Within Ice") - 5:51 (Onishko, A. Koskinen, J. Koskinen)
4. "Halls of Shadowheart" - 4:36 (A. Koskinen, J. Koskinen, Leeni-Maria Hovila)
5. "Pedon Loitsu" ("The Spell Of The Beast") - 5:57 (A. Koskinen, J. Koskinen, Lukas Pearsall)
6. "Burden" - 4:31 (Onishko, J. Koskinen, Ville Ryöti)
7. "The Tyrant" - 5:44 (A. Koskinen, J. Koskinen, Onishko)
8. "Tiarnäch - Verinummi" ("Bloodmoor") - 2:33 (Hovila, J. Koskinen, A. Koskinen)
9. "Verivala" ("Bloodoath") - 4:01 (Hovila, Ryöti, J. Koskinen, A. Koskinen)
10. "Korpin Laulu" ("Raven's Song") - 5:19 (Hovila, J. Koskinen, A. Koskinen)
11. "Mustan Valtikan Aika" ("The Era Of The Black Scepter") - 7:00 (Rinkinen, J. Koskinen. A. Koskinen)
12. "Viimeinen Peikkokuningas" ("The Last Of The Troll Kings") - 2:22
13. "Leaves" - 4:42
- Tracks 2 and 3 are re-recordings of songs from the "Taottu" EP.
- Tracks 5 and 11 are re-recordings of songs from the "Mustan Valtikan Aika" EP.
- Tracks 6 and 7 are re-recordings of songs from "The New Chapter" demo.
- Track 12 and 13 are bonus tracks. Track 13 is a cover of a song by The Gathering

== Personnel ==
=== Kivimetsän Druidi ===
- Leeni-Maria Hovila: Female Vocal
- Joni Koskinen: Lead Guitar, Male Vocal, Choir Vocal
- Antti Rinkinen: Rhythm Guitar
- Antti Koskinen: Keyboards, Synthesizers, Choir Vocal
- Simo Lehtonen: Bass, Male Backing Vocal
- Atte Martinen: Drums, Percussion

=== Additional personnel ===
- Janne Virkki, Olle Korte, Pasi Itäniemi, Vesa Virtanen, Ville Konka, Esa Orjatsalo: Choir

== Production ==
- Arranged By Kivimetsän Druidi
- Produced, Engineered & Mixed By Esa Orjsatsalo
- Digital Editing By Artturi Laukkanen & Timo Kuismanen
- Mastered By Svante Forsback
