= Dark Diary =

Studio album by Magica
- Released: 28 May 2010
- Length: 42:32
- Label: AFM Records

Magica chronology
Wolves and Witches (2008)	Dark Diary (2010)	Center of the Great Unknown (2012)

Dark Diary is the fifth full-length studio album released by the Romanian power metal band Magica.

== Track listing ==
1. "Anywhere But Home" 4:22
2. "Tonight" 03:32
3. "Never Like You" 03:59
4. "Wait for Me" 04:18
5. "Need" 04:00
6. "Release My Demons" 04:08
7. "On the Side of Evil" 04:21
8. "My Kin My Enemy" 04:05
9. "Used to be an Angel" 03:34
10. "We are Horde" 04:21
11. "Dear Diary" 01:52
12. "Victory" (Bonus Track) 4:31

== Credits ==
- Ana Mladinovici - Vocals
- Bogdan Costea - Guitar
- Sorin Vlad - Bass
- 6Fingers - Keyboards
- Hertz - Drums
