= Psalms of Conscious Martyrdom =

Studio album by Stigmata
- Released: May 26, 2010
- Recorded: Q Audio, Sri Lanka
- Genre: Hard rock, progressive metal, heavy metal
- Length: 56:41
- Label: M Entertainment
- Producer: Tenny, Andrew, Suresh and Ozzie Nugara

Stigmata chronology
Silent Chaos Serpentine (2006)	Psalms of Conscious Martyrdom (2010)	The Ascetic Paradox (2015)

Singles from Psalms of Conscious Martyrdom
- 1. "Purer (Libera Nos a Malo)" Released: 2010

Professional ratings
Review scores
Source	Rating
The A.V. Club	(Positive)
The Backdoor	(Positive)
Lakbima	(Positive)
Media Slayer Productions	8.5/10 stars

Psalms of Conscious Martyrdom is the third studio album by Sri Lankan heavy metal band Stigmata, released in May 2010. The album has been described as "an incredible journey through passageways of extreme metal with amazing technical dexterity, infectious melodies and heavy grooves to rip the skin off your bones". This is tripped out music that is powerful, memorable and mesmerizing." This is also the first Stigmata album to be sold online.

== Track listing ==
1. SpiralComa 7.11
2. Purer (Libera Nos a Malo) 4.55
3. The Summoning Cry of Aries 8.52
4. Nothing 9.02
5. A Dead Rose Wails for Light 6.18
6. If Alpha Meets Omega 2.43
7. Od(d)yssey 5.47
8. March of the Saints 11.48

== Album line up ==
- Suresh De Silva - Vocals
- Tennyson Napoleon - Rhythm Guitar
- Andrew Obeyasekere - Lead Guitar
- Javeen Soysa - Bass Guitar
- Taraka Roshan Senewirathne - Drums
