= The Eyes of a Traitor =

English metalcore band

- Origin: Harpenden, Hertfordshire, England
- Genres: Metalcore, progressive metal, melodic hardcore, melodic death metal
- Years active: 2006–2015
- Labels: Listenable Records, Thirty Days of Night Records, Doom Patrol Foundation
- Members: Jack Delany; Sam Brennan; Matthew Pugh; Tim George; Tom Hollings
- Past members: Ian Cubbon; David McCretton; Jack Moulsdale; Paul Waudby; Stephen Whitworth
- Website: theeyesofatraitor.com

The Eyes of a Traitor were an English metalcore band from Harpenden, Hertfordshire, formed in the summer of 2006. The band consists of vocalist Jack Delany, drummer Sam Brennan, guitarists Tim George and Matthew Pugh, and bassist Tom Hollings. There have been numerous line-up changes within the band, mainly due to members wishing to pursue education. According to the band, its name derives from a conversation the band members had whilst watching Star Wars.

They have released two extended plays, and two full-length studio albums. Their debut EP By Sunset was released in November 2007 after writing and recording it earlier that year. In 2007, they signed with Listenable Records and then released their debut album, A Clear Perception, on the record label in 2009. Their second studio album, Breathless, was released in July 2010 after featuring a different line-up, maintaining only the vocalist and drummer of the band as original members. In 2011, they independently released and distributed a second EP, The Disease EP, through live shows. The band was in the process of recording their third studio album; however declared their hiatus on 20 November 2011 and eventually split-up in 2015.

== History ==
=== Formation, A Clear Perception and Breathless (2006–2010) ===
The band formed in August 2006 when Delany and guitarist Stephen Whitworth first met in Luton, Bedfordshire. A year after their formation, they parted ways with their bassist, Ian Cubbon, due to musical differences. Releasing their first extended play, By Sunset on the underground English label Thirty Days of Night Records led to them touring across the country. Their first tour was a seven-day UK tour in support of the Italian band Godless Crusade. In the winter of 2007, the band did a headline tour with the death-metal band Aortic Dissection, leading to them being acknowledged by Listenable Records. This subsequently led to the signing of a three-album deal with the label. Guitarist David McCretton left the band after the release of the first of three albums 'A Clear Perception' to further his education and pursue a career in medicine. He was replaced by Pugh, an old friend of the band.

In conjunction with their release of the A Clear Perception album – produced by Ed Sokolowski at EAS Studios in Milton Keynes, Buckinghamshire – on 6 February 2009, they were confirmed as the main support for the French metal band Gojira on the UK dates of Gojira's The Way of All Flesh Tour. Shortly after, the band embarked on a seven-day headline tour with the English melodic death metal band Ignominious Incarceration, as well as the bands Argent Dawn and Many Things Untold. This was the start of an extensive tour schedule which was to occupy them for the remainder of the year. On 1 September 2009, the band released a digital single, "Nothing to Offer". This was later re-recorded for their second album, Breathless.

On 18 January 2010, Paul Waudby announced that he would be leaving the band in pursuit of a career outside of the music industry. With the band due to go into the studio two weeks later, Jack Moulsdale – both a close friend and technical support of the band – stood in to become their new bassist. In anticipation of the release of Breathless in July 2010, the band toured across the UK and Continental Europe extensively, joining the American mathcore band The Chariot's European headline tour with the American metal band Iwrestledabearonce starting 9 April and extending until 9 May 2010. On 27 June 2010, they appeared at Ghostfest 2010 on the Monster Energy Stage alongside other groups, including Gallows, Devil Sold His Soul and Lower Than Atlantis. On 18 September 2010, the band revealed on their Facebook module that they would release an EP consisting of four re-recorded tracks from their debut album: "Under Siege", "Escape These Walls", "Like Clockwork" and "The Impact of Two Hearts". The EP was originally announced to be released around Christmas, but was delayed indefinitely. Justin Lowe, the guitarist of the American metalcore band After the Burial, mixed the tracks while Sokolowski produced them. The EP's completion was hindered because After the Burial was touring with the American band As I Lay Dying.

=== The Disease and proposed third studio album (since 2011) ===
Between 16 September and 23 September 2011, the band toured the UK with the British melodic hardcore band Heart in Hand and deathcore band Martyr Defiled. As part of the tour they had a promotion of their new four-track EP, The Disease EP, limited to 200 copies and sold only at concerts. In conjunction, the title track "Disease" became available to stream from the band's Facebook module. On 9 November 2011, the EP was made free by the band via Front magazine. On 20 November 2011, the band revealed, via their Facebook module, that they were taking a break as a band. Brennan joined Heart in Hand, while Delany started two new metalcore bands, Rivers and Brave the Moment. Upon Delany joining Brave The Moment he helped write his first song with the band False Prophet and made his first live performance with the band at Stay Rad Festival 2012 with Heart of a Coward and Polar. Delany then joined Manchester metalcore band Empires Fade

The band did only two one-off shows in 2012, initially in Madrid, Spain, with the German metalcore band Caliban, on 4 May 2012, but then they were confirmed to play at Ghostfest 2012 on Sunday 1 July. The band replaced Rivers, one of the bands that developed out of The Eyes of a Traitor that had to pull out of the festival. Hollings and Alex Green, formerly of English mathcore-technical-metal band The Arusha Accord, performed with the band at Ghostfest, with Hollings becoming the band's new bassist and Green performing clean vocals. Since announcing their hiatus, they have been writing their third album.

== Musical style and influences ==
Whitworth, when asked how he would describe the band's sound, said that they "combine technicality with melodic sensibilities, metal and occasional sprinklings from other genres." The band have been described by critics as metalcore, melodic death metal, and melodic metalcore. Many critics have credited them for their accelerated progression through the British metal scene considering the age of the band members. By the time their first EP was released, the average age of the members was 17.

Members of the band have said they are influenced by the metalcore band Textures as well as a heavy amount of technical death metal bands, including Gojira and Necrophagist. Other influences include Children of Bodom, In Flames, Misery Signals, Meshuggah, Slipknot and Thrice.

== Band members ==
=== Final lineup ===
- Jack Delany – vocals (2006–2015)
- Sam Brennan – drums (2006–2015)
- Matthew Pugh – guitars (2008–2015)
- Tim George – guitars (2010–2015)
- Tom Hollings – bass (2012–2015)

=== Former ===
- Ian Cubbon – bass (2006–2007)
- David McCretton – guitars (2006–2008)
- Paul Waudby – bass (2007–2010)
- Stephen Whitworth – guitars (2006–2010)
- Jack Moulsdale – bass (2010–2012)

=== Touring ===
- Alex Green – clean vocals (2012)

== Discography ==
=== Studio albums ===
- A Clear Perception (2009)
- Breathless (2010)

=== Extended plays ===
- By Sunset (2007)
- The Disease EP (2011)

=== Singles ===
- "Nothing to Offer" (2009)
- "Come to My Senses" (2010)

== See also ==
- List of bands from England
- List of deathcore bands
- List of melodic death metal bands
- List of progressive metal bands
- British rock music
