= Man of Two Visions =

Studio album by Valkyrie
- Released: 2008
- Genre: Heavy metal, doom metal, stoner metal
- Length: 37:24
- Label: Noble Origins

Professional ratings
Review scores
Source	Rating
Consequence of Sound	F
MetalSucks	Positive
PopMatters	6/10

Man of Two Visions is a studio album by American doom metal band Valkyrie. It was released on 12" vinyl and CD in 2008 by Noble Origins. It was re-released in 2010 by MeteorCity.

== Critical reception ==
PopMatters called Man of Two Visions "an ambitious album that harkens back to the origins of heavy metal, while simultaneously incorporating both classic rock sections and elements of the modern Southern metal sound." MetalSucks wrote that "the ease with which both [Jake and Pete Adams] weave in and out of each others' [guitar] lines is the kind of chemistry only a duo that came from the same uterus can harness."

== Track listing ==
1. "Running Out" – 5:07
2. "Dawntide's Breeze" – 5:52
3. "Green Highlander" – 2:58
4. "Apocalypse Unsealed" – 5:34
5. "False Dreams" – 5:50
6. "The Gorge" – 5:01
7. "Man of Two Visions" – 7:02

== Personnel ==
- Jake Adams – guitars, vocals
- Pete Adams – guitars, vocals
- Will Barry-Rec – bass
- Warren Hawkins – drums
