= Coordinates of Confusion =

Studio album by Negligence
- Released: October 8, 2010
- Recorded: 2010, at Negligence Studio, Ljubljana, Slovenia
- Genre: Thrash metal
- Length: 45:59
- Label: Metal Blade
- Producers: Ruzz, Jey

Negligence chronology
Options of a Trapped Mind (2007)	Coordinates of Confusion (2010)

Professional ratings
Review scores
Source	Rating
About.com	9/10 stars
Metal Temple	8/10 stars
Metal.de	8/10 stars

Coordinates of Confusion is the second album by Slovenian thrash metal band Negligence. It was released by Metal Blade Records on October 8, 2010, making Negligence the first Slovenian metal act to ever have a worldwide release by a foreign label.

== Background ==
While recorded with the same line-up that featured on Options of a Trapped Mind three years earlier, the album marks the departure of Dyz, who left the band at the closing stages of finishing the album. The group toured in Poland, supporting Artillery on their eastern European leg of the tour and appeared on various festivals and gigs, opening for the likes of Megadeth, Lamb of God and other numerous bands.

== Track listing ==
No.	Title	Length
1.	"Mind Decay"	03:54
2.	"Screaming Fear"	05:22
3.	"Addicted To Aggression"	03:23
4.	"Disharmony"	03:23
5.	"The Way To..."	01:09
6.	"Insane Asylum"	05:30
7.	"The Q Box"	04:22
8.	"Sickened"	04:35
9.	"Shark Attack"	03:24
10.	"Coordinates Of Confusion"	10:57

== Personnel ==
Negligence

- Alex - lead vocals
- Jey - guitar
- Lipnik - bass guitar
- Ruzz - drums
- Dyz - guitar

Production

- Produced, Engineered and Mixed by Ruzz and Jey, Mastered by Alan Douches at West West Side Studios, New York.
