= Kiuas =

Finnish power metal band

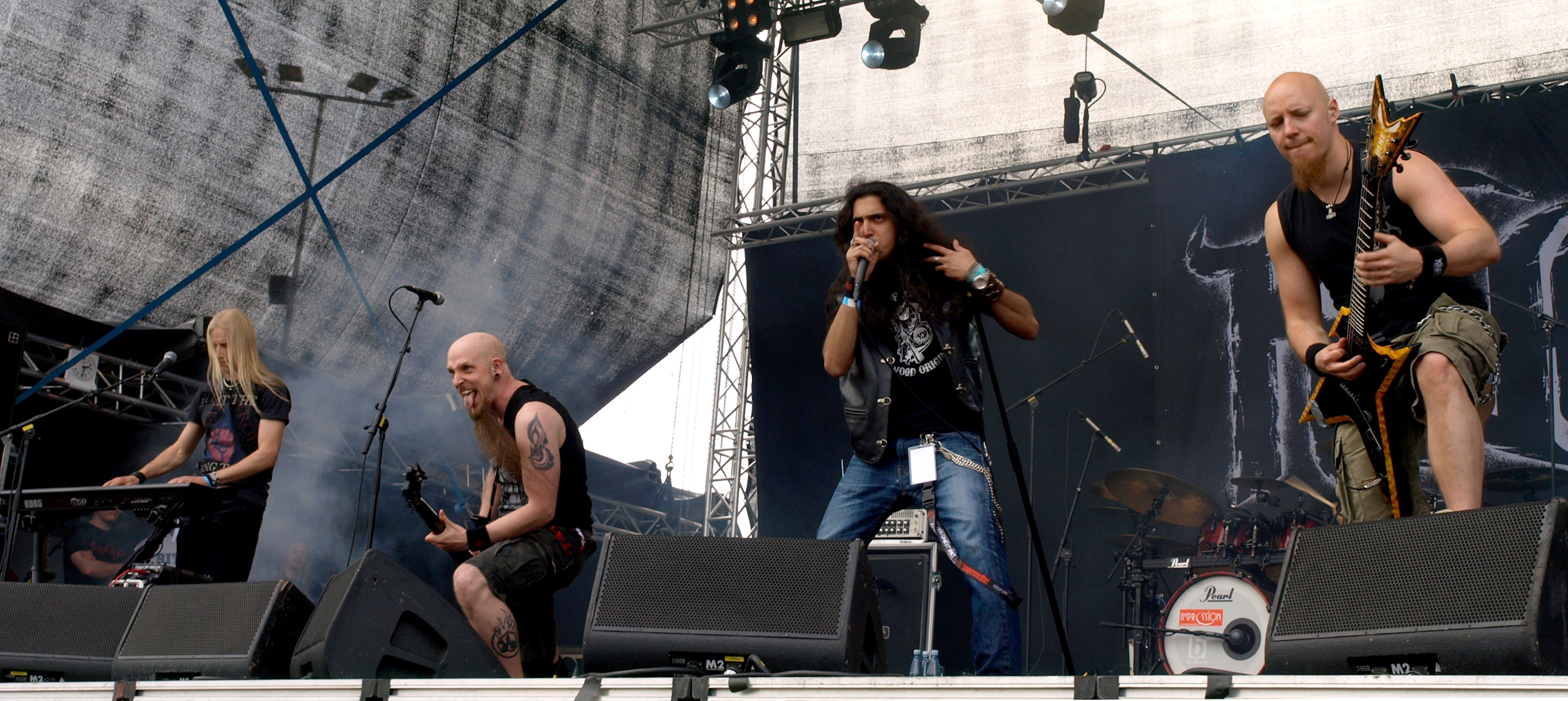
- Kiuas performing at Myötätuulirock 2011

Background information
- Origin: Espoo, Finland
- Genres: Power metal
- Years active: 2000–2013, 2021–present
- Label: Spinefarm
- Members: Ilja Jalkanen; Mikko Salovaara; Atte Tanskanen; Markku Näreneva; Teemu Tuominen
- Past members: Asim Searah; Rainer "Raikku" Tuomikanto; Jari Pailamo
- Website: kiuasband.com
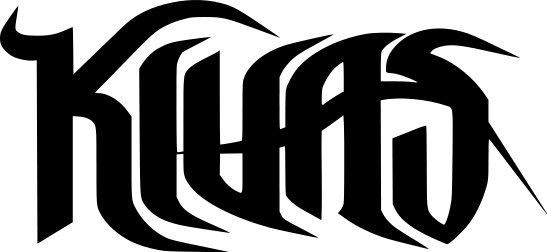

Kiuas is a Finnish power metal band from Espoo. Their music mixes power metal with influences from folk metal and different styles of extreme metal. Influences from progressive metal can also be heard in some songs.

== History ==
Before the formation of Kiuas, three musicians (Markku Näreneva, Teemu Tuominen and Ilja Jalkanen) played in a band known as Iconofear, which plays a genre of music known as dark heavy metal. Iconofear had formed after the break-up of a blackened death metal band known as Agonia. They released a single EP before those three musicians left the band to concentrate on Kiuas. Kiuas was formed in 2000 when the four original members (Mikko Salovaara, Markku Näreneva, Teemu Tuominen and Atte Tanskanen) found a lead singer, Ilja Jalkanen.

In 2002, funded only by themselves, they released their first demo known as The Discipline of Steel, which featured four songs and was rooted deep in the mysticism and importance of steel, and its effect on Finnish culture.

In 2003, they successfully released Born Under the Northern Lights and soon had many offers for record deals. With fans on their side, and a deal from Rage of Achilles, they signed the contract.

In 2004, Kiuas's first label-aided release was completed. Their first EP, Winter in June, was released in Finland and was well received in the metal and hard rock community. Their ability to combine extreme subgenres of metal with hard rock and classical guitar have led them to become a recognizable force.

Later that year, Rage of Achilles reported that they were going out of business due to the fact they could not support themselves due to belonging to so many record deals in such short amount of time. For this reason, Kiuas, and their co-workers, and associated acts; Amoral, Elenium, Omnium Gatherum, Manitou were cast out without a label, and some without any official release. A few months later, an offer came from the major-label Spinefarm Records.

In 2005, they completed and released their first album, The Spirit of Ukko, which was based on the Pagan gods, primarily Ukko. In May 2006, their second album Reformation was released. It is generally more structured and technical, while keeping the signature sound of the band.

Their third studio album, The New Dark Age, was released on 12 March 2008 in Finland with other dates to be announced. This album was a slight departure from their previous, as it adopted a much heavier, more serious sound. Their new single, "Of Sacrifice, Loss and Reward", was released on 20 February 2008. Kiuas also supported Children of Bodom in their show at London's Astoria alongside another Finnish folk metal act, Moonsorrow. Kiuas also performed with Serenity Dies and Nothnegal on 5 September 2008 at Alimas Carnival, Malé, Maldives. The show was called "Revolution Begins".

Vocalist Ilja Jalkanen stated in an interview that guitarist and primary songwriter Mikko Salovaara wrote material for a follow-up to 2008's The New Dark Age in summer 2009. The album was released 31 March 2010 and is titled Lustdriven.

On 27 October, Kiuas announced the departure of singer Ilja Jalkanen. In Ilja's own words: "My heart is not in heavy metal anymore, and a great band like Kiuas deserves a singer completely dedicated to the music." On 16 January 2011, at Nosturi, Helsinki, stand-in vocalist Asim Searah was officially inaugurated as the new frontman of Kiuas. On 11 September 2012, Kiuas announced that they had fired their new vocalist, Asim Searah.

On 29 August 2013, Kiuas officially announced they were disbanding after a final show in Helsinki on 18 October of the same year.

On 24 February 2021, Kiuas announced that they had reformed and are planning on releasing new music and playing gigs during 2021. The reformed lineup consists of the original members of the band: Tuominen, Näreneva, Salovaara, Tanskanen and Jalkanen.

A four-track EP titled Samooja: Pyhiinvaellus was released on 1 March 2024, featuring the original band lineup.

== Band members ==
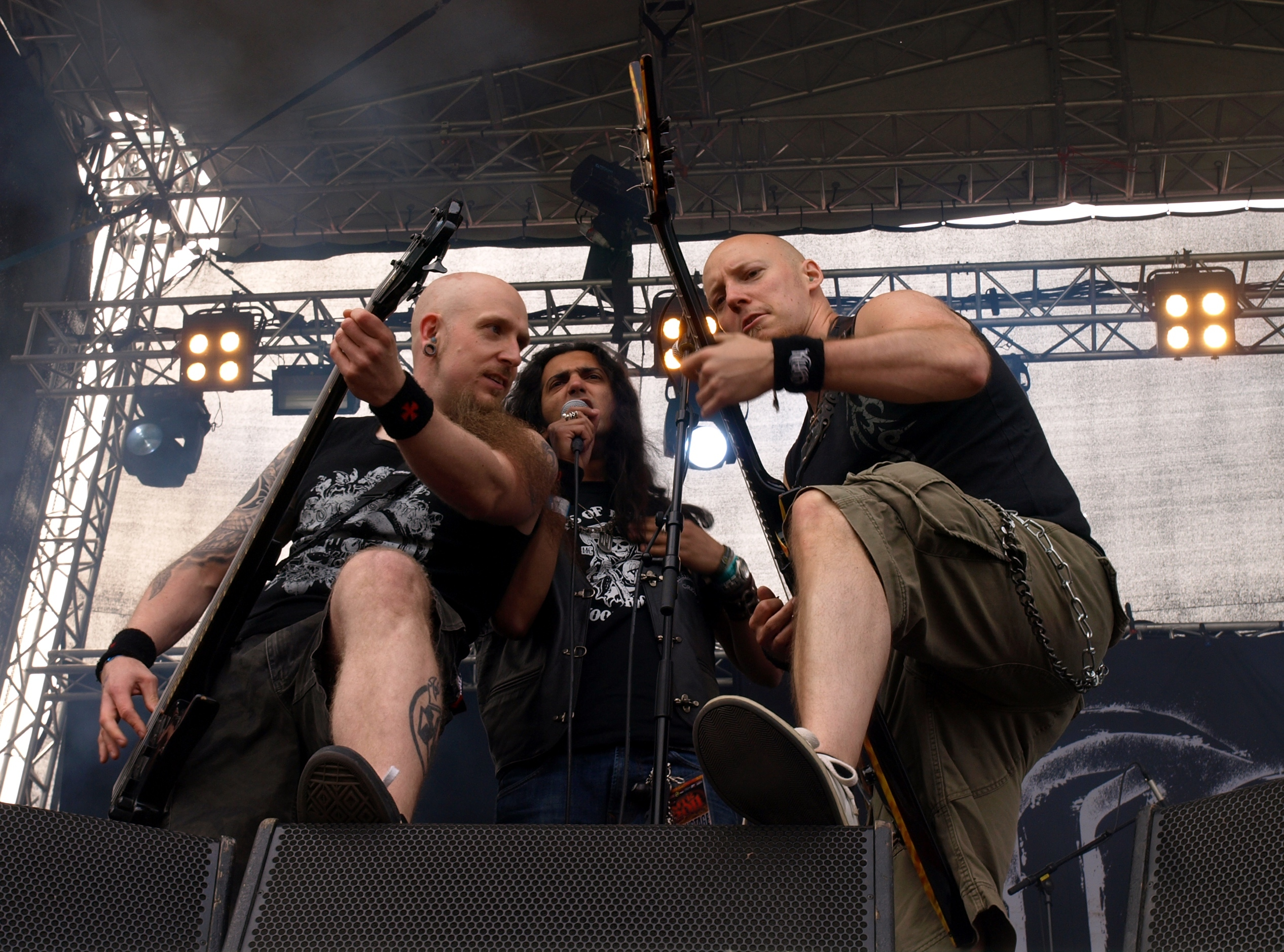
Teemu Tuominen, Asim Searah and Mikko Salovaara

=== Current ===
- Mikko Salovaara – guitar, vocals (2000–2013, 2021–present)
- Teemu Tuominen – bass guitar (2000–2013, 2021–present)
- Ilja Jalkanen – vocals (2000–2010, 2021–present)
- Markku Näreneva – drums (2000–2011, 2021–present)
- Atte Tanskanen – keyboard (2000–2011, 2021–present)

=== Former ===
- Asim Searah – vocals, guitar (2010–2012)
- Rainer Tuomikanto – drums (2011–2013)
- Jari Pailamo – keyboard (2011–2013)

== Discography ==
=== Studio albums ===
- The Spirit of Ukko (2005)
- Reformation (2006)
- The New Dark Age (2008)
- Lustdriven (2010)

=== EPs ===
- Winter in June (2004)
- Kiuas War Anthems (2008)
- Sailing Ships (2009)
- Samooja: Pyhiinvaellus (2024)

=== Singles ===
- "Race with the Falcons" (2006)
- "Of Sacrifice, Loss and Reward" (2008)
- "Of Love, Lust and Human Nature" (2010)

=== Music videos ===
- "The Decaying Doctrine" (2008)
- "Conqueror" (2008)
- "Of Love, Lust and Human Nature" (2010)
