= Magica (band) =

Romanian power metal band

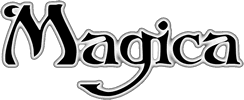
- Logo of the romanian Band Magica

Background information
- Origin: Constanţa, Romania
- Genres: Power metal, symphonic metal, gothic metal
- Years active: 2002-present
- Labels: Sigma, Bestial, Underclass-music France, AFM
- Members: Ana Mladinovici; Bogdan "Bat" Costea; Cristian "Baronu" Popescu; Theo Scrioșteanu; Radu Mihai
- Past members: Viorel Raileanu; Adrian Mihai; Valentin "ÎngerAlb" Zechiu; Cristi "Beavis" Bârlă; Sixfingers; Sorin Vlad; Herman "Hertz" Heidel; Bogdan Avrigeanu; Sebastian Natas; Emilian Burcea; Tibi Dutu

Magica is a Romanian power metal band.

== History ==
Magica started in February 2002 as a project of Bogdan Costea, guitarist (at that time) of a local gothic metal band, Interitus Dei. The reason for starting this band was Bogdan's desire to play the music that he likes: heavy metal & melodic rock.

The recordings for the first album started in spring 2002. After two months of work, the material was ready. The album, entitled The Scroll of Stone, tells the story of princess Alma tricked by a demon, she loses her soul and so her quest begins. She has to find the Scroll of Stone, the only thing powerful enough to break the demon's spell. The Scroll of Stone was produced in Romania by Sigma Records and was well received by the media, in spite of the lack of promotion. The second album, Lightseeker, has been launched in October 2004 in France through Underclass Music. Magica's first video, "Bittersweet Nightshade", was ready on February 10, 2005. Magica has been featured in the famous Metallian and Rock Hard magazine. In 2006 the band had the pleasure of touring Europe opening for After Forever and Nightmare, Apocalyptica and Leaves' Eyes.

The third album is called Hereafter and was released at 19 October 2007 via AFM Records Germany. 2 videos were shot for this album, "All waters have the colour of drowning" and "Entangled". In November 2007, Ana was invited to take part in the huge Hellish Rock tour alongside Helloween, Gamma Ray and Axxis for 3 months of intense touring.

The band's follow-up release was called Wolves and Witches and was released through AFM Records in October 2008. In 2010 the band recorded and released their follow-up, Dark Diary, through AFM.

In August 2012, Magica announced on their Facebook page that the next album will be called Center of The Great Unknown, still through AFM Records.

== Band members ==
Current

- Ana Mladinovici – vocals (2002–present)
- Bogdan Costea – guitar (2002–present)
- Cristian "Baronu" Popescu - bass (2016–present)
- Alex "Gomez" Dascaloiu - drums (2021–present)

Former

- Valentin "ÎngerAlb" Zechiu – bass (2002–2008)
- Cristi "Beavis" Bârlă – drums (2003–2008)
- Sixfingers – keyboards (2003–2010)
- Sorin Vlad – bass (2008–2010)
- Herman "Hertz" Heidel – drums (2008–2011)
- Bogdan Avrigeanu – bass (2010–2011)
- Sebastian Natas – drums (2011–2013)
- Emilian Burcea – guitar (2007–2008, 2010–2012)
- Tibi Dutu – bass (2011–2012)
- Radu Mihai - keyboard (2016–2019)

== Discography ==
=== Studio albums ===
- The Scroll of Stone (2002)
- Lightseeker (2004)
- Hereafter (2007)
- Wolves and Witches (2008)
- Dark Diary (2010)
- Center of the Great Unknown (2012)

=== VHS ===
- Live in Paris (2005)
