= The Soulless =

British metalcore band

- Also known as: Ignominious Incarceration
- Origin: Bath, England
- Genres: Metalcore, death metal (early)
- Years active: 2006–2014
- Label: Earache
- Past members: Andy Wardle; Steve Brown; Chris Ball; Kristan Dawson; Dan Wilding; Danny Guy; John McGurrell; Carlos Collier; Sam Bailey

The Soulless, formerly Ignominious Incarceration, are a metalcore band based in Bath in the south west of England.

== History ==
=== Formation (2006–2009) ===
The band formed in summer 2006. They played their first show for an audience of 20 people. By their third show, they had replaced Abigail Williams on a tour slot as the main support act for Bring Me the Horizon and were playing to over 400 people. They were named one of the best new English death metal bands. They have toured with Trigger the Bloodshed and Bleed from Within, and recorded a six-track EP.

Two years later, the band signed a worldwide recording contract with Earache Records. They recorded a debut album, Of Winter Born, at Grindstone Studios in Suffolk in September 2008 with producer Scott Atkins (Sylosis, Gama Bomb).

Ignominious Incarceration toured supporting Bring Me the Horizon, Deez Nuts, and the Red Shore on the European leg of their tour. In the UK, they played with the Argent Dawn and the Eyes of a Traitor. They toured the UK and Europe with Beneath the Massacre and Cryptopsy.

=== Of Winter Born and name change ===
Of Winter Born was released by Earache Records on 7 April 2009. Of Winter Born has been described as "...relentless in nature" by Kerrang! magazine; "...an overpowering barrage of old school riffs" by Terrorizer; "...a striking, technically superb brutally memorable debut" by Rock Sound; and "...a taut and satisfying riff-storm that finds its melodic roots" by Revolver. According to Metal Hammer magazine, the band had "...already found the right balance of technique, melody and brutality. While many young metal bands rehash clichés and old school encumbrances, this lot are threatening to be something altogether different and more demanding."

On 23 September 2010, Ignominious Incarceration changed their name to the Soulless. The group commented, "We wanted a new name which was easy to remember and say... the name has a dark, edgy feel to it, but is not instantly recognisable as metal and it's easy to say! We feel this represents us a lot better, as well as our new music."

== Members ==
=== Final line-up ===
- Andy Wardle – vocals (2006–2014)
- Steve Brown – guitar (2006–2014)
- Chris Ball – bass (2006–2014)
- Dan Wilding – drums (2011–2014)
- Kristan Dawson – guitar (2011–2014)

=== Former members ===
- Danny Guy – guitar (2008–2009)
- John McGurrell – guitar (2009–2014)
- Carlos Collier – guitar (2006–2008)
- Sam Bailey – drums (2006–2011)

=== Live members ===
- Bobby Daniels – guitar (2009–2010) (Only played live on the Masters of Metal Tour in 2009)

== Discography ==
=== As Ignominious Incarceration ===
- Deeds of Days Long Gone (EP) (2008)
- Of Winter Born (2009)

=== As the Soulless ===
- Isolated (2011)
