= Arise (film) =

- Directed by: Naveen Marasinghe and Dinesh Guneratne
- Produced by: Naveen Marasinghe and Dinesh Guneratne
- Music by: Funeral in Heaven; Merlock; Cannabis; Fallen Grace
- Distributed by: Mathawaada Chithrapata
- Release date: May 15, 2010
- Running time: 71 minutes
- Country: Sri Lanka
- Language: English

Arise: The Sri Lankan Metal Music Documentary is a 2010 feature film documentary about Sri Lankan metal music. The film was directed and produced by Naveen Marasinghe and Dinesh Guneratne.

The film features four bands which play different styles within the metal music genre: Funeral in Heaven (Black Metal), Fallen Grace (Melodic Death), Merlock (Thrash Progressive) and Cannabis (Sludge Metal). The filmmakers show the bands in performance, interview the groups about the music scene and their experiences in it. The film was shot on DV using borrowed equipment in clubs around Colombo and Kandy, Sri Lanka over a period of two years.

The documentary was screened by Mathawaada Chithrapata on 15 May 2010, at the Alliance Française de Colombo. As of August 2010, the film has not been widely released to reviewers or the Internet - the filmmakers have stated that DVDs will be distributed at concerts presented by the bands.
