= Despicable (EP) =

EP by Carcass
- Released: 30 October 2020
- Recorded: November 2018 – August 2019
- Studio: Ghost Ward Studios (Stockholm, Sweden), The Stationhouse (Leeds, United Kingdom)
- Genre: Melodic death metal
- Length: 18:51
- Label: Nuclear Blast

Carcass chronology
Surgical Remission/Surplus Steel (2014)	Despicable (2020)	Torn Arteries (2021)

Singles from Despicable
- 1. "The Living Dead at the Manchester Morgue" Released: 21 August 2020; 2. "The Long and Winding Bier Road" Released: 18 September 2020

Professional ratings
Review scores
Source	Rating
Metal Injection	10/10 stars
Sonic Perspectives	4/5 stars
Wall of Sound	7/10 stars

Despicable is an EP by British extreme metal band Carcass. It was released through Nuclear Blast on 30 October 2020.

== Track listing ==
All lyrics are written by Jeffrey Walker; all music is composed by Bill Steer, Walker and Daniel Wilding.

No.	Title	Length
1.	"The Living Dead at the Manchester Morgue"	5:58
2.	"The Long and Winding Bier Road"	4:21
3.	"Under the Scalpel Blade"	3:55
4.	"Slaughtered in Soho"	4:37
Total length:		18:51

== Personnel ==
- Jeff Walker – bass, lead vocals
- Bill Steer – guitars, backing vocals
- Daniel Wilding – drums, backing vocals
