= Sons of Azrael =

American screamo band

- Origin: Buffalo, New York, United States
- Genres: Death metal
- Years active: 2004−2012
- Labels: Metal Blade; Ironclad Recordings
- Members: Rob Steinwandel; Karl Kirsch; Alex Chambers
- Past members: Tony Lorenzo (deceased); Joe Siracuse (deceased); Derrick Sadkowski; Greg DiPasquale; Cory Kurasz; Vinnie Mai; Tim Partyka; Mark Taggart
- Website: www.sonsofazrael.com

Sons of Azrael was an American death metal band from Buffalo, New York, that formed in 2004.

== History ==
Their first album, The Conjuration of Vengeance, was released in August 2007.

== Members ==
Guitarist Tony Lorenzo was shot and paralysed in October 2011. He died in March 2017, aged 30.

In October 2012 singer Joe Siracuse died, aged 29. The band has remained inactive since Siracuse's death.

== Discography ==
- 2-Song Demo (2004)
- Kill Yourself (Demo, 2004)
- A Bullet, That Blew The Beauty Off Your Face (Demo, 2005)
- Ashes to Ashes (Demo, 2006)
- The Conjuration of Vengeance (CD, Ironclad/Metal Blade, 2007)
- Scouting the Boneyard (2010)
