= Monumento (album) =

Studio album by Dakrya
- Released: May 23, 2008
- Recorded: Q Recording Studios
- Genre: Symphonic metal, gothic metal
- Length: 53:04
- Label: Another Sphere Records; 279 Productions
- Producer: Sophia Charalampous

Dakrya chronology
Monumento (2008)	Crime Scene (2010)

Professional ratings
Review scores
Source	Rating
Sonic Cathedral	10/10 stars

Monumento is the debut album by the Greek metal band Dakrya. It was released worldwide on May 23, 2008.

== Track listing ==
All music by Sophia Charalampous, except "Reflections and Illusions" by Sophia Charalampous and George Droulias. All lyrics by Sophia Charalampous.

1. "Crucifixion of Faith" – 5:33
2. "Thorns of Punishment" – 4:46
3. "Newborn Hope" – 5:15
4. "Reflections and Illusions" – 4:50
5. "Waters of Oblivion" – 5:51
6. "Inner Scream" – 5:21
7. "Revelations of a Madman" – 6:10
8. "Into The Vortex" – 4:41
9. "The Black Opera (Opus IX)" – 6:54

=== Bonus Tracks ===
10. "Wingless Souls" – 3:43

== Personnel ==
=== Band members ===
- Thomais Chatzigianni – Vocals
- Christina Kalantzi – Vocals
- Sophia Charalampous – Keyboards
- George Droulias – Guitars
- Alex Drake – Bass
- Charis Kampitsis – Drums

=== Production ===
- Sophia Charalampous – producer
- Manos Konstantinidis – engineer, mix, master

=== Additional musicians ===
- Panagiotis Matrakas (Nethescerial) – Brutal Vocals
- Thomas Kotrotsios – Declamations
