= Kivimetsän Druidi =

Finnish metal band

- Also known as: KmD
- Origin: Kouvola, Finland
- Genres: Symphonic metal Folk metal Black metal
- Years active: 2002–2017
- Label: Century Media
- Past members: Joni Koskinen; Antti Koskinen; Antti Rinkinen; Simo Lehtonen; Atte Marttinen; Leeni-Maria Hovila; Ville Ryöti; Jani Rämä; Jouni Riihelä; Annika Laaksonen; Lukas Pearsall; Jenni Onishko
- Website: http://www.kivimetsandruidi.com/

Kivimetsän Druidi, or KmD, was a Finnish folk metal band founded in 2002. "Kivimetsän Druidi" is Finnish for "druid of the stone forest".

== Band history ==
KmD originally started as a two-man project by the Koskinen brothers. Lead guitarist and vocalist Joni Koskinen's biggest influence has been Moonsorrow, though each band member has their own personal influences.

Their lyrics are based on the fantasy novel that Joni Koskinen is writing. The novel tells a story from The Land of the Crystal Mountain and Stone Forest.

After releasing numerous demos and EPs, Kivimetsän Druidi eventually signed a record deal with Century Media in 2008. The debut album titled Shadowheart was released in October 2008. All the band's EPs and demos were self-released.

== Band members ==
=== Final lineup ===
- Leeni-Maria Hovila - female vocals (2008-2017)
- Joni Koskinen - male vocals, lead guitar (2002-2017)
- Antti Koskinen - keyboards (2002-2017)
- Antti Rinkinen - guitar (2004-2017)
- Simo Lehtonen - bass guitar (2007-2017)
- Atte Marttinen - drums (2007-2017)

=== Former ===
- Ville Ryöti - drums (2005–2007)
- Jani Rämä - drums (2004–2005) (became a technician for the band)
- Jouni Riihelä - bass (2004–2006)
- Annika Laaksonen - female vocals (2004–2006)
- Lukas Pearsall - synth (2004–2007)
- Jenni Onishko - female vocals (2006–2008)

== Discography ==
=== Studio albums ===
- Shadowheart (2008)
- Betrayal, Justice, Revenge (2010)

=== EPs ===
- Mustan valtikan aika (2006)
- Taottu (2008)
- The Lost Captains (2016)

=== Demos ===
- Kristallivuoren maa (2003)
- Taival (2004)
- The New Chapter (2007)
