= Valkyrie (American band) =

American doom metal band

- Origin: Harrisonburg, Virginia
- Genres: Doom metal, hard rock, heavy metal
- Years active: 2002–present
- Labels: Relapse Records, Twin Earth, Meteorcity, Kreation, Noble Origin
- Members: Jake Adams; Pete Adams; Warren Hawkins; Alan Fary
- Past members: Eric Seaman; Luke Shafer; Mike Hoke; Nick Crabill; Nic McInturff; Gary Isom; Will Barry-Rec

Valkyrie is an American doom metal band from Harrisonburg, Virginia, led by brothers Jake and Pete Adams.

== History ==
Valkyrie formed in the summer of 2002 as a three-piece consisting of vocalist/guitarist Jake Adams, bassist Eric Seaman, and drummer Luke Shafer. In 2004, Jake's brother Pete was introduced on second guitar and a five-song demo was recorded at a local college radio station. Shafer was soon replaced by Mike Hoke on drums, and a new demo, Sunlight Shines, as well as a split 7-inch with VOG were recorded.

Seaman and Hoke parted ways with the band at the end of 2004 and were replaced by bassist Nick Crabill and drummer Nic McInturff. This line-up recorded the eponymous debut album, which was released by Twin Earth Records. In early 2006 Valkyrie again parted ways with its rhythm section and recruited bassist Will Barry-Rec and drummer Gary Isom (Spirit Caravan, Pentagram). Isom and Valkyrie parted ways in mid-2007 and Valkyrie recruited drummer Warren Hawkins.

In 2014, Valkyrie was signed to Relapse Records. The band's 2015 album Shadows and 2020 album Fear were both released through the label.

== Musical style ==
Valkyrie draws from pre-metal style to create a stoner metal sound. Blabbermouth described the band as "Drawing heavily from the classic eras of hard rock and heavy metal," saying "Valkyrie plays guitar-driven rock 'n' roll replete with infectious solos and catchy, powerful vocals. The band has drawn numerous comparisons to greats like Thin Lizzy, Scorpion, Black Sabbath, early Iron Maiden, and Deep Purple."

== Members ==
Current members

- Jake Adams – lead vocals, rhythm guitar (2002–present)
- Pete Adams – lead guitar, backing vocals (2004–present)
- Warren Hawkins – drums (2007–present)
- Alan Fary – bass (2012–present)

Former members

- Eric Seaman – bass (2002–2004)
- Nick Crabill – bass (2004–2006)
- Will Barry-Rec – bass (2006–2012)
- Luke Shafer – drums (2002–2004)
- Mike Hoke – drums (2004)
- Nic McInturff – drums (2004–2006)
- Gary Isom – drums (2006–2007)

Timeline

== Discography ==
Studio albums

- Valkyrie (2006, Twin Earth)
- Man of Two Visions (2008, Noble Origin)
- Shadows (2015, Relapse)
- Fear (2020, Relapse)

EPs and splits

- Valkyrie demo (self-released)
- Sunlight Shines EP (2004, self-released)
- Split 7-inch with VOG (2005, self-released)
- Split 7-inch with Bible of the Devil (2008, Heavy Birth)
- Split 7-inch with Earthling (2012, Tension Head)
