= Woe of Tyrants =

American death metal band

- Origin: Chillicothe, Ohio, United States
- Genres: Death metal, thrash metal, metalcore, melodic death metal
- Years active: 2004–present
- Labels: Tribunal, Metal Blade
- Members: Chris Catanzaro; Nick Dozer; Matt Kincaid; Shaun Gunter; Johnny Roberts
- Past members: Adam Kohler; Chris Burns; Dustin Grooms

Woe of Tyrants is an American death metal band from Chillicothe, Ohio, which formed in 2004.

== History ==
Woe of Tyrants released their critically acclaimed debut album, Behold the Lion, through Tribunal Records in June 2007, and they were soon in talks with several major players in the independent label market. In October 2007, Woe of Tyrants signed a multi-album deal with Metal Blade Records and immediately began work on what would be their first worldwide release, Kingdom of Might, released in January 2009 and produced by Joey Sturgis.

In 2009, Woe of Tyrants toured with many bands, including Unearth, God Dethroned, Psyopus, Lazarus A.D., and more. They played the main stage at the New England Metal and Hardcore Festival in April, along with the Rock & Shock Festival in October, both at the Palladium in Worcester, Massachusetts.

In December 2009, the band headed into The Basement Studios in Winston-Salem, NC with producer Jamie King (Between the Buried and Me, Through the Eyes of the Dead, The Human Abstract) to record their follow up to Kingdom of Might, slated for a spring 2010 release through Metal Blade. The release of their third album coincided with the band's participation in Overkill’s 25th Anniversary Tour, dubbed "Killfest 2010", also featuring Vader, God Dethroned, Warbringer, and Evile.

Their third studio album, entitled Threnody, was released on April 13, 2010 on Metal Blade. The album was produced by Jamie King.

On July 8, 2016, the band announced they had begun writing their fourth album, however no further releases have been made to date.

== Discography ==
- Behold the Lion (2007) Tribunal Records
- Kingdom of Might (2009) Metal Blade Records
- Threnody (2010) Metal Blade Records

== Current members ==
- Chris Catanzaro – vocals
- Tate Matthews – bass
- Matt Kincaid – guitar
- Sebastian Gies – guitar
- Johnny Roberts – drums

== Former members ==
- Adam Kohler – bass
- Chris Burns – guitar
- Fred Russell – guitar
- Joey Rider – guitar
- Dustin Grooms – drums
- Adam Routte – guitar
- Shaun Gunter – bass
