= Betrayal, Justice, Revenge =

Studio album by Kivimetsän Druidi
- Released: April 26, 2010
- Genres: Symphonic metal Folk metal
- Length: 43:53
- Label: Century Media

Kivimetsän Druidi chronology
Shadowheart (2008)	Betrayal, Justice, Revenge (2010)

Betrayal, Justice, Revenge is the second studio album by the Finnish symphonic/folk metal band Kivimetsän Druidi. It was released on April 26, 2010, through Century Media Records.

== Track listing ==
No.	Title	Length
1.	"Lament For The Fallen"	2:01
2.	"Aesis Lilim"	5:57
3.	"Seawitch And The Sorcerer"	4:55
4.	"The Visitor"	4:01
5.	"Manalan Vartija"	3:13
6.	"Tuoppein'nostelulaulu"	4:57
7.	"Chant Of The Winged One"	6:03
8.	"Of Betrayal"	6:33
9.	"Desolation: White Wolf"	6:13
10.	"Veljet" (special edition bonus track)	4:15
11.	"Where Hope And Daylight Die" (Summoning cover)	6:10
Total length:		54:18

== Personnel ==
- Leeni-Maria Hovila - vocals
- Joni Koskinen - guitars, vocals
- Antti Koskinen - keyboards
- Antti Rinkinen - guitars
- Simo Lehtonen - bass
- Atte Marttinen - drums, orchestration
