= Stigmata (Sri Lankan band) =

Sri Lankan heavy metal band

Background information
- Origin: Colombo, Sri Lanka
- Genres: Sludge metal, progressive metal, groove metal, hard rock, thrash metal, heavy metal
- Years active: 1998–present
- Labels: Rock Company, Independent, M-Entertainment
- Members: Suresh de Silva; Tennyson Napoleon; Dilshan Perera; Shayne Seneviratne; Damnatus (Kasuntha)
- Past members: Andrew Obeysekara; Lakmal Wijayagunarathna; Roshan Tharaka Seneviratne; Yohan Gunawardena; Shehan Gray; Javeen Soysa; Anik Jayasekar; Dilukshan Jayawardena; Nisho Fernando; Osanda Wangeesa; Vije Dhas; Ranil Senarath; Chathuranga Pitigala; Udaya Wickramage; Shafeek Shuail; Hafzel Preena; Thisara Dhananjaya
- Website: stigmataband.com

Stigmata is a Sri Lankan heavy metal band based in Colombo, formed in 1998.

== History ==
=== Early years ===
Suresh De Silva, Andrew Obeysekara, and Tennyson Napoleon formed the band in 1998 at S. Thomas' College, Mount Lavinia, where they were students. They played their first concert at the college in February 2000.

With bassist Shehan Gray and drummer Anik Jayasekara, the band released their first single, "Fear". In 2000, they recorded the single "Voices". Jayasekara left the band in 2001 and was replaced by Dilukshan Jayawardena.

Stigmata released their first EP, Morbid Indiscretion, in 2002. It contained the singles "The Dying Winter Sleeps" and "Thicker Than Blood", along with the instrumental track "Andura", which was based on the traditional Gajaga Wannama. During this period, the band covered music by international acts such as Deep Purple, Metallica, Led Zeppelin, Iron Maiden, Iced Earth, Judas Priest, and Cradle of Filth.

=== Hollow Dreams and Silent Chaos Serpentine ===
In 2003, following Dilukshan's departure, drummer Nishantha Fernando joined the group. In August 2003, the band released their first album, Hollow Dreams, on the local label Rock Company.

In 2004, Vije Dhas became the bass player after Shehan Gray moved to Australia. Former drummer Dilukshan filled in temporarily after Nishantha Fernando left earlier that year. By 2005, the band recruited permanent drummer Osanda Wangeesa. The acoustic track "Lucid" featured the Indian tabla, played by Sri Lankan percussionist Jananath Warakagoda. This song was later re-recorded as an electric version for the band's second studio album, Silent Chaos Serpentine, released in February 2006.

Following the album's release, the band performed in the Maldives at The Rock Storm Festival in June 2006. Drummer Ranil 'Jacky' Senarath, who had joined in August 2005, played on the album. Vije Dhas left the band in 2008 and was replaced by Javeen Soyza. In October 2008, Stigmata was featured on Ultimate Guitar's "Unsigned Artists of the Month".

Stigmata performed at the SAARC Band Festival in Delhi, sponsored by MTV India.

In 2009, the band released "A Dead Rose Wails for Light". They were interviewed and performed the song for Out of Bounds, a travel series on the Discovery Channel hosted by Ian Wright. The band headlined the SUE (Southern Ultimate Explosion) 2009 metal music festival in Johor, Malaysia.

=== Psalms of Conscious Martyrdom (2010) ===
The band's third album, Psalms of Conscious Martyrdom, was released on 26 May 2010. Following this release, Stigmata toured Australia in October 2010 as part of the Melbourne International Arts Festival. They performed at the Forum Theatre in Melbourne alongside Dead Meadow (USA) and Blarke Bayer / Black Widow (Australia).

The album lineup featured Suresh, Tenny, Andrew, Javeen, and drummer Taraka Roshan Seneviratne. Stigmata also toured Malaysia again for the Ultimate Southern Rock Explosion.

Javeen and Taraka later left the band and were replaced by Lakmal Wijeyagunawardene on bass and Chathuranga Pitigala on drums. The band performed at an army stadium in Dhaka, Bangladesh, and toured India and Dubai.

=== The Ascetic Paradox (2015) ===
On 17 October 2015, Stigmata released their fourth album, The Ascetic Paradox. The recording lineup included Tenny, Andrew, Suresh, Roshan Taraka on drums, and Lakmal Wijegunawardene on bass. The album featured a heavier sound, with the majority of the material written by Tennyson Napoleon and Suresh de Silva.

=== Lineup changes and new singles (2018–2021) ===
In 2018, the band added Thisara Dhananjaya on bass, Shafeek Shuail on rhythm guitar, and Udaya Wickremage on drums. Udaya was later replaced by Hafzel Preena.

Stigmata won the digital Asia Video Music Award for their single "An Idle Mind is the Devil’s Workshop", with a music video directed by Randy Chris. Shafeek Shuail departed shortly after.

Suresh and Tenny continued as a four-piece band with Thisara and Hafzel. They released the single "Heavy is the Head that Wears the Crown", produced by Kasun Nawaratne. The song was inspired by the film Avengers: Infinity War.

During the COVID-19 pandemic, the band released several singles, including "Alyssa" (2019), "Sacred Spaces: Solve et Coagula" (2020), and "Throw Glass in a House of Stone" (2021). These tracks were mixed and mastered by producer Romesh Dodangoda. "Alyssa" was written in memory of deceased pets, and its music video featured fan-submitted footage of animals.

The band worked briefly with the US-based Serendip Music Group in 2020 and 2021 before ending the partnership.

=== Fifth album and recent events (2022–present) ===
In 2022, Stigmata organized two concerts in Sri Lanka: "Unchained Melody" in March and "Arise" in June. Harshan Gallage joined briefly on drums in 2022 but was replaced by Shavin Hettiarachchi. During this time, guitarist Shayne Seneviratne also joined the group.

== Style and lyrical themes ==
The band's lyrics are primarily written by vocalist Suresh de Silva. Early themes included apathy, child abuse, politics, war, and social issues. Later work, starting with their third album, explored topics such as parapsychology and spirituality.

== Discography ==
=== Studio albums ===
- Hollow Dreams (2003)
- Silent Chaos Serpentine (2006)
- Psalms of Conscious Martyrdom (2010)
- The Ascetic Paradox (2015)

=== EPs ===
- Morbid Indiscretion (2002)

=== Compilations ===
- Rock Company Compilation I (2003)
- Rock Company Compilation II (2005)

=== Singles ===
- "Fear" (1999)
- "Redemption" (1999)
- "Voices" (2000)
- "Thicker than Blood" (2003)
- "The Dying Winter Sleeps" (2003)
- "Extinction" (2003)
- "Hollow Dreams" (2003)
- "Inspired" (2003)
- "Falling Away" (2003)
- "Lucid" (Acoustic) (2004)
- "Forgiven, Forgotten" (2006)
- "Jazz Theory" (2006)
- "Lucid" (Heavy) (2006)
- "Solitude" (2006)
- "My Malice" (2007)
- "A Dead Rose Wails for Light" (2008/2009)
- "Purer (Libera Nos a Malo)" (2010)
- "Spiral Coma" (2010)
- "An Idle Mind is the Devil’s Workshop" (2015)
- "Axioma" (2015)
- "Heavy is the Head that Wears the Crown" (2018)
- "Alyssa" (2019)
- "Sacred Spaces: Solve et Coaglua" (2020)
- "Throw Glass in a House of Stone" (2021)

=== Music videos ===
- "Falling Away"
- "On the Wings of the Storm"
- "An Idle Mind Is The Devil's Workshop"

== Band members ==
Current members

- Suresh De Silva – vocals, lyrics (1998–present)
- Tennyson Napoleon – rhythm guitar (1998–2017), lead guitar (2017–present)
- Thisara Dhananjaya – bass guitar (2017–present)
- Shayne Seneviratne – guitar (2022–present)
- Damnatus (Kasuntha) – drums (2023–present)

Past members

- Shafeek Shuhail – rhythm guitar (2017–2019)
- Andrew Obeyesekere – lead guitar (1998–2017)
- Javeen Soysa – bass guitar (2008–2010)
- Yohan Gunawardena – drums (1999)
- Shehan Gray – bass guitar (2000–2003)
- Anik Jayasekara – drums (2000)
- Dilukshan Jayawardena – drums (2001–2003, 2004)
- Nishantha Fernando – drums (2003–2004)
- Osanda Wangeesa – drums (2004)
- Vije Dhas – bass guitar (2004–2008)
- Ranil "Jackson" Senarath – drums (2005–2009)
- Roshan Taraka Seniviratne – drums (2010–2012, 2015–2016)
- Lakmal Wijeyagunewardena – bass guitar (2014–2016)
- Chathuranga Pitigala – drums (2012–2015)
- Nirodha Jayasinghe – drums (2011)
- Udaya Wickramage – drums (2017–2018)
- Hafzel Preena – drums (2018–2022)
- Harshan Gallage – drums (2022)
- Shavin Hettiarachchi – drums (2022–2023)
