= Lustdriven =

Studio album by Kiuas
- Released: 31 March 2010
- Recorded: 2009
- Genre: Power metal
- Length: 48:48
- Label: Spinefarm
- Producer: Janne Joutsenniemi

Kiuas chronology
The New Dark Age (2008)	Lustdriven (2010)

Lustdriven is the fourth studio album by Finnish heavy metal band Kiuas. It was released 31 March 2010 by Spinefarm Records.

== Track listing ==
No.	Title	Length
1.	"Kiuassault"	4:37
2.	"Cry Little Angel"	3:59
3.	"Of Love, Lust and Human Nature"	4:05
4.	"Aftermath"	5:23
5.	"Lights Are Many"	4:52
6.	"The Visionary"	6:34
7.	"Heart and Will"	4:32
8.	"The Quickening"	4:00
9.	"Summer's End"	5:03
10.	"Winter's Sting"	5:43
Total length:		48:48

== Personnel ==
- Ilja Jalkanen – vocals
- Mikko Salovaara – guitars, vocals
- Markku Näreneva – drums
- Atte Tanskanen – keyboard
- Teemu Tuominen – bass guitar
