= Negligence (band) =

Slovenian thrash metal band

Background information
- Origin: Ljubljana, Slovenia
- Genres: Thrash metal
- Years active: 2000 - present
- Label: unsigned
- Members: Alex; Mitja Lipicer; Ziga "Ruzz" Zmazek; Aljosa Orlovic; Lux Znidersic (live)
- Past members: Domen "Dyz" Justin; Lenz; Jan "Jey" Svigelj
- Website: http://www.myspace.com/negligence

Negligence is a Slovenian thrash metal band, formed in 2000. The group was last signed to Metal Blade Records and has so far released two albums and an EP.

== History ==
Negligence was founded by Jan Svigelj and Domen Justin in 2000. Initially formed as a side-project to Justin's then primary band Dusk Delight, the group quickly turned full-time, with Mitja Lipicer and Ziga Zmazek joining that same year. The band struggled to find a vocalist initially and performed as an instrumental outfit for several shows before eventually settling with Lenz in 2003. That same year, Justin ultimately quit Dusk Delight to fully focus on Negligence, after he had already recorded guitars for their debut album Stories.

Negligence released two demos between 2003 and 2005 with Lenz on vocals and started touring Slovenia extensively. The tour saw Negligence open for the first edition of the Metal Camp festival held in Tolmin, thus being the first band to ever perform there. However, the line-up did not last long and in 2005, Lenz was replaced by then 15-year-old Aleks, who at the time parted ways with another well-known Slovenian band Metalsteel in 2005.

== Options of a Trapped Mind ==
In 2007, they released their debut album Options of a Trapped Mind which was met with positive reviews and was voted top thrash metal album of 2007 by internet fanzine Thrashzone. The band once again went on tour and supported several well known thrash metal acts such as Exodus, Forbidden, Sadus, Heathen, Death Angel, etc.

== Dyz's departure and Coordinates Of Confusion ==
At the end of 2009, after the recording of their second album took place, Negligence privately parted ways with Domen Justin and replaced him with Aljosa Orlovic of Scaffold fame. In 2010 the band announced their signing with a US record label Metal Blade Records and in October same year released their sophomore album entitled Coordinates Of Confusion. A promotional European tour supporting Artillery in 2011 followed.

== Band hiatus and a new EP ==
In 2012 the group announced it had entered the studio to begin recording a new album. The unnamed album was reportedly finished in 2016, but its release was delayed due to unspecified reasons. A string of three digital singles was released at the end of 2018, exclusively through YouTube. The three songs were later released as an EP called "Breaking the Fourth Wall". At the same time they announced their split with long-standing member Jan 'Jay' Svigelj.

== Band members ==
- Alex - vocals
- Mitja Lipicer - bass
- Ziga "Ruzz" Zmazek - drums
- Aljosa Orlovic - guitars
- Lux Znidersic (live)

Former

- Domen "Dyz" Justin - guitar
- Lenz - vocals
- Jan Svigelj - guitars

== Discography ==
Studio albums

Year	Album	Label	Chart peaks
Year	Album	Label	US
2007	Options of a Trapped Mind	Rock it Up	-
2010	Coordinates of Confusion	Metal Blade	-
2018	Breaking the Fourth Wall	Self-released	-

== Videography ==
- War Machine
