= Dakrya =

Greek musical group

- Origin: Athens, Greece
- Genres: Avant-garde metal, experimental metal, gothic metal
- Years active: 2004–present
- Labels: Sensory Records, 279 Productions
- Members: Thina Chat (vocals); Mike Karasoulis (vocals); George Droulias (Guitars & vocals); Sophia Charalampous (Keyboards); Alex Drake (Bass); Stavros Vorisis (Drums); John Kefallinos (Guitars)
- Past members: Charis Kampitsis (drums); Christina Kalantzi (Vocals); Angelos Charogiannis (Guitars)
- Website: www.dakrya.com

Dakrya is a theatrical metal band from Athens, Greece that was formed in late 2004 by Sophia Charalampous. The idea was to create a band that could develop a theatrical attitude and combine different musical elements with the dynamics of metal and rock sound.

== History ==
Many rehearsals and line-up changes brought the first demo release for Dakrya in mid-2005 entitled Without Destination. The singers Margina (female vocals) and Costas Lazarou (male vocals) participated as guest musicians for the recordings of the song. The reviews were good and soon Christina Kalantzi (vocals) and Thina Chat (vocals) joined the band as lead singers. Many live shows followed (mostly in Greece) as the band worked on new songs for their first full-length album to come.

In 2007 Dakrya enters the studios to record their debut album entitled Monumento that was released on May 23, 2008 by Another Sphere Records (in France, Canada, Belgium) and 279 Productions (Greece & Cyprus). Monumento received much praise for its highly unusual yet carefully conceived musical concept. In early 2009 Dakrya was the opening act for the live show of Moonspell at Principal Club Theater in Thessaloniki. After this show, George Droulias (Guitars & Vocals) had to leave the band for personal reasons. Meanwhile, Dakrya worked with a few session guitarists until late 2009 when Angelos Charogiannis (Guitars) joined the band and George Droulias (Guitars & Vocals) returned.

In 2010 the band came up with a new concept album and entered the studios once again for the recordings. In March 2010 the band traveled to Sweden to produce their new album with Pelle Saether (Diablo Swing Orchestra, Madder Mortem, ACT, and Goran Finnberg (Dark Tranquillity, Opeth, Arch Enemy). On May 23, 2010 Dakrya released a CD-Single with the song "The Urban Tribe". In July 2010 the band signed a worldwide contract with "Intromental Management & Booking Agency" and also with Sensory Records for the release of their second full-length album entitled "Crime Scene. The album was released on October 12, 2010 worldwide and received great reviews from the press.

In 2012-2013 the band's line-up changes when Angelos Charogiannis (Guitars) and Christina Kalantzi (Vocals) are replaced by John Kefallinos (Guitars) and Mike Karasoulis (Vocals).

The band appeared at Voices of the Mist Festival, volume 2.

== Members ==
=== Current members ===
- Thina Chat - Vocals
- Mike Karasoulis - Vocals
- George Droulias - Guitars, Backing Vocals
- Giannis Kefallinos - Guitars
- SophiaX - Keyboards
- Alex Drakos - Bass
- Stavros Vorissis - Drums

=== Past members ===
- Christina Kalantzi - Vocals (2005 - 2012)
- Angelos Charogiannis - Guitars (2009 - 2011)
- Charis Kampitsis - Drums (2005 - 2007)

== Discography ==
=== Albums ===
- Monumento (May 23, 2008)
- Crime Scene (October 12, 2010)

=== Singles ===
- The Urban Tribe (2010, CD-Single)

=== Compilations ===
- Demonic and Divine (June 1, 2009, Femme Metal Records)
