= Low Twelve =

Low 12
- Origin: Bloomington, Illinois, United States
- Genres: Thrash Metal
- Years active: 1998–present
- Label: Rotting Corpse Records 2006–present
- Members: Pete "Bald Pate" Altieri; Travis "H2O" Waterman; Jeremy "The Worm" Meister; Les "Manly" Aldridge

Low Twelve (Low 12 or ↓2) is an American Heavy Metal band from Bloomington, Illinois, United States. They typically play in a thrash metal style, and often take inspiration from historical figures and events for their music. The band currently consists of founder, lead singer and bassist Pete Altieri, drummer Travis Waterman, plus Les Aldridge and Jeremy Meister on guitar. The band has released three albums (Flesh of the Weak, Unfit for Human Occupancy, and This Side Towards Enemy) and two demos, as well as being featured on many compilations and soundtracks. They released their fourth CD, Splatter Pattern, in May 2010.

== History ==
=== Formation and demos ===
Low Twelve began in July 1998 as founder Pete Altieri, decided to end his 10-year departure from heavy metal. He decided to name the band Low Twelve after reading the phrase in an old book on Freemasonry, which simply meant midnight. It can also mean the very end of something, like the moments right before death.

Pete began to write material, develop the logo and band presentation as he found guitarists Tim McCleland and Les Aldridge. Together with original drummer Steve Chestney, Low Twelve practiced a rigorous schedule to perform their début show at Club Edge in Bloomington, on February 6, 1999. It would be the first of many live shows.

Shortly after that show, the band released their début four-song demo, Blunt Force Trauma. The demo received praise by metal magazines worldwide and sold nearly 1,000 copies. After only a couple of months, the band decided to hit the studio again and released the EP, Kill Floor, and sold another 1,000 copies of it by hand duplicating and assembling each one. Several cuts from Kill Floor dominated the metal charts on mp3.com and they began to get airplay in stations throughout the US as well as Germany, The Netherlands, and beyond. In 1999, Pete Altieri founded Heavycore, a union of heavy bands worldwide.

=== Flesh of the Weak ===
Steve Chestney left the band and was replaced in November 1999 with Wes Pollock. Dubbed the "Kill Floor Kid", Pollock brought a new slant on the style of the band. The new material began to transform into a faster and more intricate sound. In June 2000, Low Twelve recorded their debut album, Flesh of the Weak. The 70-minute CD was released in December 2000 as they supported Pro-Pain on the "Round 6" tour for a few dates.

Reviews continue to pour in for Flesh of the Weak and many of the songs have appeared in other formats. "Twelve" and "Trench" were selected for the Siren Jukebox 2.0 software. "Brutal World" was featured in the movie trailer and during the film Jigsaw released on Full Moon Pictures on DVD. Jigsaw was released nationwide throughout Hollywood Video and Family Video stores. In addition, "Brutal World" and "Sex Sin Sermon" was on the soundtrack for Falcon Videos Horrortales 666, that came out in early 2003.

During the summer of 2002, the band embarked on a tour to New York City and back. In June 2001, Pete Altieri was diagnosed with cancer and went under emergency surgery to remove the tumour. Tests later showed Altieri still had many tumours left, and so the cancer had spread. The only option being chemotherapy, he endured the treatments while continuing to play live shows and rehearse twice a week. During the entire summer, the only show Low Twelve missed was on the day of Altieri's emergency surgery. Trips were made to Missouri and Wisconsin, and the support from the fans was a huge reason for Altieri's persistence and determination to beat the cancer. On September 11, 2001, he found out the cancer was gone.

=== Touring and live DVD ===
Tim McCleland left the band in October 2001 and after a short period of try-outs, the band decided to remain a three piece. After posting a poll on the site, 2/3 of fans voted to keep the band intact, and to not get another guitar player. At live shows, the fans loved the new approach, and with some adjustments, the band was able to perform many of their classic tunes.

Tim McCleland committed suicide on February 26, 2002, and even though he was not a member of the band, he was still a good friend to every member of Low Twelve.

In the summer of 2003 Low Twelve released its next CD, Unfit For Human Occupancy, with five newly recorded songs and two live tracks with Tim still playing. The reviews have been strong and the metal media has praised it. The CD was released with a DVD entitled Maggot Ridden Rotting Movie, but it had to be removed from the jewel case due to a legal problem that arose. To avoid litigation, Low Twelve agreed to remove the DVD and sell only the "Unfit".

=== This Side Toward Enemy and label debut ===
Low Twelve continued to tour and play live shows, as well as participate in benefits for various causes. In 2005, Altieri rallied the heavycore bands to mail CDs to soldiers in Iraq. So many CDs were sent in that the unit had a "Heavycore night" each week where the metal head soldiers cranked up their favourite heavycore bands in their day room.

In late 2004 they recorded a new full-length CD, This Side Toward Enemy, and released it on Rotting Corpse Records in February 2006. The band signed the deal with the Chicago-based label in January 2006 and has already reaped the benefits of having a hard working indie label on your side. The sales have been strong, especially in Europe and Asia, as the metal media raves about the epic release. The CD boasts 12 new tracks that the band recorded/produced/mixed/mastered themselves, a remix of "Twelve" and a video for the song "Kill Everything" - which features vocals by hardcore legend Gary Meskil of Pro-Pain. Other tracks on the CD feature vocalists from other Heavycore bands.

== Splatter Pattern ==
In March 2008, Aldridge decided to pack it in after ten years on guitar duties, and so the band decided to draft two new guitar players to go back to the original two-guitar attack. Jeremy Meister, formerly of the Breed of Sedition/Human Hatemachine/Killborn has joined forces with the band. Soon after Meister was added, Dan Steinlicht (Zero Shift, formerly of Redeeming Damnation) was approached and welcomed the challenge. Already the Low Twelve sound is changing - but even heavier than before with two guitar players in tow. Unfortunately, after only 18 months in the band, Low Twelve parted ways with guitarist Steinlicht and Aldridge rejoined bringing the sound full circle with the Meister/Aldridge combination.

Despite the challenge, Low Twelve has already begun recording their fourth album, Splatter Pattern.

In November 2010, Pollock decided to leave the band to pursue a career in the audio engineering industry. Low Twelve decided to have friend of the band, Travis Waterman, step in to replace Pollock on drums; ultimately dubbed the new breed of Low Twelve, which lasted a few years. After the band separated, Waterman, Meister, and former guitarist Dan Steinlicht all went on to play with and find local success with Dwells Within.

== Personnel ==
- Pete Altieri – lead vocals, Bass (1998–present)
- Meister – Guitar, backing vocals (2008–present)
- Travis Waterman – Drums (2010–present)
- Les Aldridge - Lead Guitar (1998–2008, 2009–present)

== Discography ==
=== Studio albums ===
- Flesh of the Weak (2000) - self-released
- Unfit for Human Occupancy (2003) - self released
- This Side Toward Enemy (2006) - released on Rotting Corpse Records
- Splatter Pattern (May 2010) - released on DBC Records

=== Demos ===
- Blunt Force Trauma (1999) - self-released
- Kill Floor (1999) - self-released

=== Compilations and soundtracks ===
- "Enemy of the State" appeared on Locomotive II CD in 1999
- "Trench" appeared on Bad Ass Bands from Chicagoland CD in 2000
- "Twelve" and "Trench" appeared on Siren Jukebox 2.0 software in 2000
- "Brutal World" appeared on Heavy as Fuck Volume I CD in 2001
- "Brutal World" appeared on The Harder the Better Volume I CD in 2002
- "Brutal World" appeared on the Jigsaw movie soundtrack in 2002
- "Sex Sin Sermon" appeared on the Horrortales 666 soundtrack in 2002
- "Lines Drawn" appeared on The Killings Fields CD in 2002
- "Heavycore" appeared on Core Til Death CD in 2002
- "Lines Drawn" appeared on Core TIl Death II CD in 2003
- "Lines Drawn" video appeared on Roasting Posers Volume I DVD in 2004
- "Kill Everything" appeared on Core Til Death III CD in 2004
- "Your God" appeared on Core Til Death IV CD in 2005
- "Your God" appeared on Raw Aggression III CD in 2006
