= The Funeral Pyre =

American blackened death metal band

- Also known as: Envilent (2001)
- Origin: La Habra, California, U.S.
- Genres: Blackened death metal, melodic death metal, melodic black metal
- Years active: 2001–2012
- Labels: Creator Destructor, Prosthetic, Forest Moon
- Members: James Joyce; John Strachan; Alex Hernandez; Adam Campbell
- Past members: Jason Dunn; Daniella Jones; Justin Garcia; Lanny Perelman; Alex Lopez
- Website: thefuneralpyre666.blogspot.com

The Funeral Pyre was an American blackened death metal band from La Habra, California. The band released four studio albums and various shorter works before playing their last advertised show in 2012.

== History ==
Guitarist James Joyce, keyboardist Daniella Jones, vocalist John Strachan, drummer Alex Hernandez, and bassist Adam Campbell formed the band in La Habra, California, in 2001, as Envilent. They were part of the underground extreme music scenes across Los Angeles and Orange counties. Metal internet press outlets praised the band for their Swedish-style melody, ethereal keyboards, and blackened vocals.

The band released several demos and the EP Whispering to the Shadows. They changed their name to The Funeral Pyre before the 2003 release of the EP October. A year later, the band released Immersed by the Flames of Mankind.

In August 2006, the band released The Nature of Betrayal, recorded at Ulug studios in Costa Mesa, California, through Creator-Destructor Records, an independent California-based recording studio. Initial internet sales enabled a distribution deal with Prosthetic Records, and The Nature of Betrayal was re-released in March 2007. Keyboardist Daniella Jones left the band for "musical differences" and was briefly replaced with second guitarist Justin Garcia, who was in turn replaced with Lanny Perelman, who also left the band.

A third album, Wounds, was recorded in January and February 2008 with producer John Haddad, and released in May of that year. The band embraced black metal with the release of Wounds, as well as later works.

They recorded the EP December during December 2008. It received limited distribution by Creator-Destructor in March 2009. Forest Moon Special Products released a 7-inch split with Landmine Marathon shortly after.

The band released their final studio album, Vultures at Dawn, in June 2010 on Prosthetic Records. It was generally well received. Experimental songs "Monolith" and "To Watch the Earth Rot" were praised for expanding their songwriting.

== Members ==
Current members

- James Joyce – guitar
- Alex Hernandez – drums
- John Strachan – vocals
- Adam Campbell – bass

Former members

- Jason Dunn – guitar
- Daniella Jones – keyboards
- Justin Garcia – guitar
- Lanny Perelman – guitar
- Alex Lopez – guitar

== Discography ==
Studio albums

- 2004: Immersed by the Flames of Mankind
- 2006: The Nature of Betrayal
- 2008: Wounds
- 2010: Vultures at Dawn

EPs

- 2002: Whispering to the Shadows EP
- 2003: October EP
- 2006: The First Book of the Kings (split EP)
- 2009: December EP
- 2009: The Funeral Pyre/Landmine Marathon (split EP)
