= Crime Scene (Dakrya album) =

Studio album by Dakrya
- Released: October 12, 2010
- Recorded: Grindhouse Studios
- Genre: Progressive metal, Avantgarde metal
- Length: 40:34
- Label: Sensory Records
- Producer: Pelle Saether, George Bokos

Dakrya chronology
Monumento (2008)	Crime Scene (2010)

Professional ratings
Review scores
Source	Rating
Sonic Cathedral	9.5/10 stars
Allmusic	3.5/5 stars
Metalstorm.net	8.5/10 stars

Crime Scene is the second full-length album by the theatrical metal band Dakrya. It is a concept album focusing on society.

== Track listing ==
1. "The Charlatans" - 4:32
2. "Blind Man's Bluff" - 5:05
3. "Scaremongering" - 4:35
4. "The Urban Tribe" - 3:59
5. "Camouflage" - 4:34
6. "Phantasmagoria" - 4:51
7. "Inertia" - 4:24
8. "Dramatis Personae" - 6:07
9. "A Dreadful Sidescene" - 2:27

== Personnel ==
=== Band members ===
- Thomais Chatzigianni - Vocals
- Christina Kalantzi - Vocals
- Angelos Charogiannis - Guitars
- George Droulias - Guitars & Backing Vocals
- Sophia Charalampous - Keyboards
- Alex Drake - Bass
- Stavros Vorisis - Drums

=== Production ===
- Pelle Saether - Mixing
- Goran Finnberg - Mastering
- George Bokos - Sound Engineering

=== Additional musicians ===
- Costas Triantafillou - Saxophone (on "Camouflage")
