= Early Graves =

American metal band

- Origin: San Francisco, California, U.S.
- Genres: Crust punk, hardcore, sludge metal, thrash metal
- Years active: 2007–2021
- Label: Ironclad/Metal Blade Records
- Spinoff of: Apiary
- Past members: Chris Brock; Dan Sneddon; Tyler Jensen; Matt O'Brien; Makh Daniels

Early Graves was an American extreme metal band that included aspects of hardcore, thrash metal, crust punk, and sludge metal in their music.

== History ==
=== Formation ===
The band formed in 2007; members had previously been in tech metal band Apiary. They toured the U.S. extensively with The Handshake Murders, Gaza, The Funeral Pyre and Unearth, amongst many others. Their debut album We: The Guillotine was released worldwide August 19, 2008, on Ironclad/Metal Blade Records. On June 22, 2010, they released a second album, Goner. The band disbanded following a performance at the Decibel Metal & Beer Festival on December 10, 2021.

=== Death of Makh Daniels ===
Early on Monday, August 2, 2010, vocalist Makh Daniels was killed in a van accident while traveling from Oregon to Reno, Nevada. Ironclad Recordings, who in June 2010 released Early Graves' second album Goner, issued the following statement:

"Last night Makh Daniels, vocalist of Early Graves, tragically lost his life in a van accident while the band was traveling from Oregon to Nevada. An official statement will be released in time, but for now our thoughts are with Makh's family, friends and bandmates during this terrible time."

== Line-up ==
=== Final lineup ===
- Chris Brock – vocals, guitar
- Dan Sneddon – drums
- Tyler Jensen – guitar
- Matt O'Brien – bass
- John Strachan – vocals

=== Past members ===
- Makh Daniels – vocals (2007–2010; his death)

== Discography ==
Release date	Title	Label
2008	We: The Guillotine	Ironclad/Metal Blade Records
2010	Goner	Ironclad/Metal Blade Records
2012	Red Horse	No Sleep Records
