= Threnody (Woe of Tyrants album) =

Studio album by Woe of Tyrants
- Released: April 13, 2010
- Recorded: December 2009
- Genre: Melodic death metal, thrash metal, power metal
- Length: 40:55
- Label: Metal Blade
- Producer: Jamie King

Woe of Tyrants chronology
Kingdom of Might (2009)	Threnody (2010)

Professional ratings
Review scores
Source	Rating
Allmusic	3.5/5 stars
PopMatters	8/10 stars

Threnody is the third album by American death metal band Woe of Tyrants, released on April 13, 2010 through Metal Blade Records. It was produced by Jamie King.

== Track listing ==
1. "Tetelestai" – 1:06
2. "Creatures of the Mire" – 4:57
3. "Venom Eye" – 4:56
4. "Tempting the Wretch" – 4:28
5. "Threnody" – 4:30
6. "Bloodsmear" – 5:40
7. "The Venus Orbit" – 5:56
8. "Lightning Over Atlantis" – 5:20
9. "Singing Surrender" – 4:39
10. "Descendit Ad Inferos (The Harrowing of Hell)" – 7:39

== Personnel ==
- Chris Catanzaro – vocals
- Nick Dozer – guitar
- Matt Kincaid – guitar
- Shaun Gunter – bass
- Johnny Roberts – drums
- Dustie Waring (Between the Buried and Me) – solo on "Venom Eye"
