= Imicus =

- Genres: Rock, metal
- Years active: 2005–2015
- Label: Transcend Records
- Website: http://www.imicusband.com

Imicus are a British five-piece rock/metal band based in and around Luton and London, England. The band released their debut album Animal Factory via Transcend Records in May 2010. A single "The Marionette" followed in 2011 via a limited edition release. On 7 August the band announced the worldwide release of a new single 'The Libertine' on 26 September 2014. The band's final album 'Turbulent Skies' is released on 4 May 2015.

== History ==
Imicus formed in 2005, and spent several years building a fanbase through local gigs and self-released material. On 16 April 2009, the band announced via their Myspace page that they had agreed a deal with Transcend Records. The band's first single 'Visceral' was released on 19 October 2009, accompanied by a music video which received national airplay on metal station Scuzz. The growing interest and reputation of the band resulted in them being named as one of OneMetal's "Upcoming Bands to Watch in 2010".

Following appearances at several national festivals including two Hellfire Festivals, Hammerfest and Bulldog Bash, the debut album Animal Factory was released on 24 May 2010, and received positive reviews from several reputable magazines including RockSound, in which the band were commended for the originality of their sound and drew comparisons to bands such as Tool and Deftones. The album reached #3 in HMVs Metal Pre-Order chart.

In June 2010, the band played on the Red Bull Stage at the year's Download Festival. Following the appearance at Download, Imicus recorded their version of 'You Don't Have To Be Old To Be Wise' for a Judas Priest cover CD to be given away with July's issue of Metal Hammer magazine Imicus returned to the Bulldog Bash in 2010, this time on the main stage. The year was rounded off by a week-long UK headline tour.

In August 2011, they played Bloodstock Open Air and the Bulldog Bash festival. In October 2011, Imicus recorded "The Marionette" single and support track "Chameleons" and enlisted the knowledge of record producer Russ Russell to mix and master the songs. A run of just 400 limited edition booklets, illustrated by Richey Beckett, were printed and released in December 2011. The tracks were later made available via digital retailers such as ITunes.

Following a period of downtime in 2013 it was announced that a fresh new line-up – fronted by Miller would be writing and recording the band's second album for release in 2015. It was previewed by a return to the live scene at the UK's Hammerfest Festival and a new single - "The Libertine" released on 26 September 2014. The video for "The Libertine" cemented the band's return with extensive radio airplay and TV rotation via rock Channel 'Scuzz' TV.

On 25 March 2015, Miller announced that the band's new album Turbulent Skies would be their last and would be released worldwide via digital retailers such as ITunes, Amazon & Spotify. A limited edition run of CD copies of Turbulent Skies was produced. A final show was scheduled for 25 April 2015 at Club 85 in Hitchin in the UK - one of the venues where the band started their career.
