= Hellfire Festival =

Heavy metal festival held twice in 2009, in England

- Genre: Heavy metal, thrash metal, death metal
- Years active: 2009
- Website: hellfirefestival.com

The Hellfire Festival was a heavy metal festival held twice in 2009. The first edition of the festival was held at the O2 Academy in Islington, London in February and the second at the National Exhibition Centre in Birmingham in November. The events were organized by the Transcend Music Group.

== Hellfire I ==
The first edition of the Hellfire Festival was held from Friday, 20 February to Sunday, 22 February 2009 at the 02 Academy in Islington, London. More than 32 bands appeared at the festival spread over two stages and across the three days. Tickets for the festival were priced at £16.50 (Friday), £20.00 (Saturday), £18.00 (Sunday) or £50 for a three-day pass.

Main Stage
Friday	Saturday	Sunday
Overkill; Exodus; Gama Bomb; Torture Squad	Firewind; Alestorm; Panic Cell; The More I See; The Defiled; Godsized	Breed 77; Sabbat; Warrior Soul; Exit Ten; Anterior; Outcryfire; The Hollowed Earth Theory; Metalloid

Scuzz Stage
Friday	Saturday	Sunday
Stage Closed	Annotations of an Autopsy; Trigger the Bloodshed; The Rotted; Burning Skies; Dead Beyond Buried; RSJ; Scar My Eyes	Malefice; Sacred Mother Tongue; Romeo Must Die; Forever Never; Cinders Fall; Idiom; Soul Destruction; Imicus

== Hellfire II ==
The second edition of the Hellfire Festival was to take place from Friday, 6 November to Sunday, 8 November 2009 in Halls 8 and 9 of the National Exhibition Centre, Birmingham, in conjunction with the Music Live exhibition. More than 38 bands were to appear at the festival spread over three stages and across the three days but the Friday was cancelled due to poor ticket sales. This led to a confusing stage allocation, where 4 stages were listed but with only three locations. Tickets were priced at £25 per day or £55 for a three-day pass.

- Mistress of Ceremonies: Katie Parsons (Not in attendance)

Main Stage
Friday (cancelled)	Saturday	Sunday
CKY (cancelled); Cancer Bats (cancelled); Electric Eel Shock (cancelled)	Saxon; Anvil; Benediction; Blaze Bayley; Evile (cancelled); Sacred Mother Tongue; Beholder	Fields of the Nephilim; My Dying Bride; Anathema; Katatonia; October File; Seretonal

The Big Cheese Stage
Friday (cancelled)	Saturday	Sunday
The Dead Formats (cancelled)	The Rotted; Malefice; Ted Maul; Gama Bomb; The More I See; Viatrophy (cancelled) Bury Tomorrow; Scar My Eyes	Outcry Collective; The Painted Smiles Blakfish; Lost Souls Club; Arthemis; Huron

The Scuzz Stage
Friday (cancelled)	Saturday	Sunday
	Senser; Fei Comodo; Esoterica; Deaf Havana; Imicus; Mayra Roxx; New Device	Viking Skull; The Cumshots; Spit Like This; Tesseract; No Made Sense; Xerath the Morning After

	Metal Hammer Stage	Terrorizer Stage
Friday	Saturday	Sunday
	Exit Ten; The Plight; Savage Messiah; Rise To Remain; The Arusha Accord; The Casino Brawl; Fury UK	Trigger the Bloodshed; Abgott; Cinders Fall; Imperial Vengeance; Ingested; No Consequence; Carcer City

- Evile were originally booked to play the main stage on Saturday, but pulled out following the death of their bass player Mike Alexander. They were replaced on the bill by Blaze Bayley.
