= Hammerfest (festival) =

Annual music festival in Wales

- Genre: Heavy metal
- Dates: March, April
- Location(s): Presthaven Beach Resort, Prestatyn, Wales
- Years active: 2009–2023
- Website: hammerfest.co.uk

Hammerfest was a music festival held annually in North Wales. In 2013, Hammerfest moved to the Haven site in Pwllheli, Hafan y Môr Holiday Park as the festival outgrew its original site at Pontin's Holiday Village, Prestatyn, Wales. It is not related to a music festival of the same name hosted by white supremacist groups. The festival was owned by emc3i Ltd, sponsored by the music magazine Metal Hammer and run by the organizers of the Hard Rock Hell festival. Because the festival was held at a holiday camp, the organizers made pre-built venues and stages, and attendees stayed in the on-site accommodation. This enabled the festival to be held during the winter/spring months when outdoor camping is not desirable.

== Hammerfest I ==
The original Hammerfest was held on 24–25 April 2009 in Prestatyn. Fifty bands appeared at the festival spread over three stages and across the two days. Saxon, Sepultura and Opeth headlined the two-day event.

Main Stage
Friday – Metal on Metal	Saturday – Metal on Metal
Annotations Of An Autopsy; Opeth; Paradise Lost; Architects; HammerFall; Malefice	Mayra Roxx; Wolf; Saxon; Sepultura; Skindred; Voodoo Six; Exit 10

Stage Two
Friday – Thrash and Power Metal	Saturday – Hammer Hounds
Kiuas; Power Quest; Lethargy; Warpath; Evile; Mutant; The Rotted; Blood Island Raiders	Cathedral; Dream Evil; Sylosis; Gama Bomb; Mencea; Waylander; Alestorm; Týr; Hexagram; The Hollow Earth Theory; Grand Magus; Sacred Mother Tongue; Attica Rage

Stage Three
Friday – Buzz Metal	Saturday – Rising Records
The Defiled; Tesseract; Firebrand Superrock; Thirteenth Sign; Imicus	Open The Skies; Nex; Trigger The Bloodshed; Bleed From Within; Sworn Amongst; The Morning After; Mia Hope; Many Things Untold; Everything Burns; The Dead Lay Waiting; With Chaos In Her Wake

- Bullet for My Valentine were originally booked as headliners for the festival, but pulled out due to recording commitments.

== Hammerfest II ==
The second Hammerfest was held on 12–13 March 2010, with a pre-party on the preceding Thursday. 44 bands performed across three stages during the two-day festival, with an additional 8 bands performing on the second and third stages during the Thursday pre-party. The festival was headlined by 5 Finger Death Punch and Suicidal Tendencies.

Main Stage
Friday – Metal on Metal	Saturday – Metal on Metal
Napalm Death; 5 Finger Death Punch; DevilDriver; Katatonia; Epica; Tony Martin's Headless Cross	Sabaton; Suicidal Tendencies; Iced Earth; Skindred; Orange Goblin; Attica Rage

Stage Two
Thursday – Empire Stage	Friday – XFM	Saturday – Hammer Hounds
Gentlemans Pistols; SSS; Arthemis; Beholder; Marshall Law	Swallow the Sun; Warpath; Abgott; Conquest of Steel; October File; Malefice; Savage Messiah; Xerath	Vreid; Carach Angren; Dark Funeral; Akercocke; Zonaria; Nefarium; GU Medicine; Panic Cell; White Wizzard; Shining; Fury UK; Rise to Remain

Stage Three
Thursday – Metal Breaker	Friday – Fresh Blood	Saturday – Old Skool Metal / Metal Aid
Fury of the Waters; Crimes of Passion; Glass Artery	Revoker; Cars on Fire; No Made Sense; Sondura; Man Must Die; Echovirus	Huron; Godsized; Hellfighter; The More I See; Isolysis; Belligerence

== Hammerfest III ==
The third Hammerfest was held on 18–19 March 2011. A pre-party was held on the preceding Thursday as in the previous year, with bands performing on the second and third stages. 48 bands performed across three stages during the two-day festival, with an additional 11 bands performing during the Thursday pre-party. Accept and Sabaton were the headline acts.

Four months before the festival, Pontin's (who own the venue) went into administration. However, the festival still took place as scheduled.

Main Stage
Friday – Metal on Metal	Saturday – Metal on Metal
Ill Niño; Accept; Turisas; Wolf; Sylosis; Holy Grail	Viking Skull; Sabaton; Satyricon; Entombed; Grand Magus; Attica Rage

Stage Two
Thursday – Empire Stage	Friday – Jägermeister Stage	Saturday – Hammer Hounds
Metalica UK (tribute by Feral Circus); Attica Undercover; Elixir; Battleaxe; Jaguar; Mordecai; Krusher	Blitzkrieg; My Ruin; Headcharger; Bleed From Within; Turbowolf; Godsized; Revoker; Breed 77; Feed the Rhino; The Treatment; Never Means Maybe; Idiom	Evile; Onslaught; Gama Bomb; Diamanthian; Abadden; Mutant; Fury On; Chthonic; Deadly Circus Fire; Svart Crown; Power Quest; Beholder

Stage Three
Thursday – Metal Breaker	Friday – Fresh Blood	Saturday – Metal Forge
Graveyard; Triaxis; Dirty Rose; Krusher	Spirtyus; Subservience; Arceye; Ravenface; The Mercy House; Guardians of Andromeda	Sa-da-kO; Oaf; Ten Cent Toy; Cry Havoc; Severenth; Outgunned

== Hammerfest IV ==
Hammerfest returned for a fourth edition of the festival on 15–18 March 2012. Anthrax and Skindred were the headline acts on the main stage. The format was the same as previous years with the pre-party beginning on the Thursday night. In Total, 57 bands played across the three stages. Tickets for next year's Hammerfest 5 went on sale during the festival which promises to be bigger than ever at the new site.

Main Stage
Friday – Battle Stage	Saturday – Metal on Metal
Diamond Plate; Waylander; Chimaira; Paradise Lost; Anthrax; Evile	Hell; Wizard; Dream Evil; Amon Amarth; Skindred; Criminal

Stage Two
Thursday – Thor's Stage	Friday – New Sounds Stage	Saturday – Hammer Hounds
Krusher; Black Rose; Fury; Saracen; The Sanity Days; Dirty DC; Krusher	Arthemis; Sci-Fi Mafia; Heaven's Basement; Fury UK; Asomvel; Slam Cartel; Ravenface; RSJ; Archen; Falling Red; Evil Scarecrow; Lawnmower Deth	Chemicals Of Democracy; Severenth; Cerebral Bore; Sworn Amongst; Avenger; Senser; Mortad; Snakebite; Elimination; Virus; Holosade; Savage Messiah

Stage Three
Thursday – Embryo Metal	Friday – Fresh Blood	Saturday – Metal Forge
Firebrand Super Rock; A Thousand Enemies; Flame Fracture	Inferno; Kyrbgrider; Trucker Diablo; Savage Outlaw; Spirytus; One More Victim	Oaf; Collapse; AR; Red Mist; Dripback; Let's Play God

== Hammerfest V ==
The fifth installment took place between the 14 and 16 March 2013. The pre-party night took place on the 14th with bands playing on the second stage. Hammerfest 5 saw the introduction of an unplugged stage on the Friday but in general only two stages were used. The event was moved to Hafan Y Mor in Pwllheli.

Main Stage
Friday – Dragon Stage	Saturday – Rising Sun
The Idol Dead; Chemicals Of Democracy; Arthemis; Attica Rage; Iron Savior; Enslaved; Hatebreed; Killing Joke; Desctruction; Sci-Fi Mafia	Commander In Chief; Shear; 4Arm; Heidevolk; Senser; Sodom; Angel Witch; Candlemass; Saint Vitus; Napalm Death

Stage Two
Thursday – Samurai Stage	Friday – Jägermeister Stage	Saturday – Jägermeister Stage
Goddam Electric; Dyscarnate; Black Acid Souls; Vicious Nature; Savage Messiah; Sacred Mother Tongue; Sister Sin; Krusher	Sansara; Deadman Sugar; Fire In The Empire; Triaxis; Ancient Adelesant; Iron Knights; RSJ; Cayne; Chimp Spanner; Bloodshot Dawn; Absolva; Winterfylleth; Lifer; Viza; Evil Scarecrow	OAF; Flayed Disciple; Driven; Monument; Bull Riff Stampede; Making Monsters; Undersmile; Serpent Venom; HARK; Def Con One; MOS Generator; Abadden; Line Of Fire; Bludvera; Mpire Of Evil

Stage Three
Friday – Unplugged At The Barrell
Triaxis; Chemicals Of Democracy; Arthemis; Attica; Viza

== Hammerfest VI ==
Hammerfest VI ("Book of the Dead") was in Pwllheli from 13 to 16 March 2014.

== Hammerfest VII ==
Hammerfest VII, titled "METAL MARAUDERS" was held from 12 to 15 March 2015.
