= Hell Unleashed =

Studio album by Evile
- Released: 30 April 2021
- Recorded: 2020
- Studio: Backstage Studios, Derbyshire, England
- Genre: Thrash metal
- Length: 41:40
- Label: Napalm
- Producer: Chris Clancy

Evile chronology
Skull (2013)	Hell Unleashed (2021)	The Unknown (2023)

Singles from Hell Unleashed
- 1. "Hell Unleashed" Released: 3 February 2021; 2. "Gore" Released: 18 March 2021; 3. "The Thing (1982)" Released: 27 April 2021

Professional ratings
Review scores
Source	Rating
Decibel	8/10
Kerrang!	4/5 stars
Metal Hammer	3.5/5 stars

Hell Unleashed is the fifth studio album by British thrash metal band Evile, released on 30 April 2021 by Napalm Records. It is the band's first studio album since Skull (2013), making it their longest gap between studio albums to date. It also marks the first album to feature Adam Smith, who replaced original lead vocalist and rhythm guitarist Matt Drake, and the first to feature lead guitarist Ol Drake on vocal duties.

== Background ==
In 2013, Ol Drake left Evile and released his debut solo album, Old Rake, in 2015, before subsequently re-joining in 2018. The band announced Matt Drake's departure in August 2020, the latter citing family commitments and recurring health setbacks as reasons for leaving. Ol replaced Matt on vocal duties, whilst Adam Smith, guitarist and vocalist of RipTide, joined as the new rhythm guitarist. Wanting to keep familiar faces in the band, Ol said taking on vocal duties "made sense" to him. He cited Chuck Schuldiner of Death as "one of [his] heroes". In December 2020, Evile announced the recording of a new studio album; the first in seven years.

=== Writing ===
Ol describes Evile's writing style as "more aggressive" in comparison to Evile's previous outings, citing Sepultura and the death metal genre as influences. The band had not written any new material since 2013, which Ol described as "old" and not the approach the band "wanted to go for this time around". In part, the latter is why they chose to collaborate with Chris Clancy instead of long-term Evile producer Russ Russell.

"Evile basically hadn't done anything since 2013. I figured I'd get on with writing for the record and we had our ideas set out by June 2019".

— Ol Drake, December 2020.

== Reception ==
The title track is the first single, unveiled on 3 February 2021 alongside the official music video, directed by James Mansell. The follow-up to this was the second single and video for "Gore", also directed by James Mansell. The third and final single/video was for the song "The Thing (1982)". The album was released on 30 April 2021 via Napalm Records.

== Track listing ==
The track listing was unveiled in February 2021 (Note: This is Evile's first studio album to feature a cover song.).

No.	Title	Music	Length
1.	"Paralysed"	Ol Drake, Karl Gary Smith, Ben Carter	5:03
2.	"Gore" (featuring Brian Posehn)	Ol Drake, Matt Drake, Karl Gary Smith	4:48
3.	"Incarcerated"	Ol Drake, Matt Drake	6:16
4.	"War of Attrition"	Ol Drake, Ben Carter	4:25
5.	"Disorder"	Ol Drake	4:57
6.	"The Thing (1982)"	Ol Drake	4:54
7.	"Zombie Apocalypse" (Mortician cover)	Will Rahmer, Roger Beaujard	2:30
8.	"Control from Above"	Ol Drake	4:50
9.	"Hell Unleashed"	Ol Drake, Ben Carter	3:57
Total length:			41:40

== Personnel ==
=== Band members ===
- Ol Drake – lead vocals, lead guitar
- Ben Carter – drums
- Joel Graham – bass
- Adam Smith – rhythm guitar

=== Additional ===
- Michael Whelan – cover artwork (Note: Whelan previously collaborated with the band for Infected Nations.)
- Gustave Doré – CD/vinyl booklet images
- Brian Posehn – backing vocals
- Chris Clancy – producer
- Ol Drake – co-producer
- Maria de Lacruz Balcells – booklet sketches

== Charts ==
Chart performance for Hell Unleashed
Chart (2021)	Peak position
UK Rock & Metal Albums (OCC)	5
Scottish Albums (OCC)	53
