= The Fateful Dark =

Studio album by Savage Messiah
- Released: 10 March 2014 (Europe); 18 March 2014 (USA)
- Recorded: Grindstone Studios, Suffolk, England
- Genre: Thrash metal, heavy metal
- Length: 52:05; 64:14 (iTunes)
- Label: Earache Records (Europe); Century Media Records (USA)
- Producer: Scott Atkins

Savage Messiah chronology
Plague of Conscience (2012)	The Fateful Dark (2014)

Professional ratings
Review scores
Source	Rating
AllMusic	4/5 stars
Kerrang!	KKKK
Metal Hammer	8/10
Metal Temple	9/10 discs
PlanetMosh	5/5 stars

The Fateful Dark is the third studio album from British heavy metal band Savage Messiah, released by Earache Records in Europe and Century Media Records in the USA.

== Production ==
The band returned to Grindstone Studios in Suffolk, England and producer Scott Atkins (who they had worked with previously on their 2009 album Insurrection Rising and 2012 album Plague Of Conscience) to record The Fateful Dark, between July and October 2013.

== Release ==
The album was released in Europe on 10 March 2014, by Earache Records, and then a little over a week later in the USA on 18 March 2014, by Century Media Records.
As well as being released in standard CD and digital formats, The Fateful Dark was made available on a limited run of 1,000 Limited Edition gatefold vinyl records (400 on Black vinyl, 300 on Cross of Babylon Orange vinyl, 200 on Hellblazer Red/Yellow vinyl and 100 on Inconocaust Clear vinyl).
In February 2014 an official music video for "Hellblazer" was released, directed by Tom Walsh and featuring contortionist and Game of Thrones star Pixie Le Knot.

== Track listing ==
All lyrics are written by Dave Silver; all music is composed by Savage Messiah, except where noted

No.	Title	Length
1.	"Iconocaust"	6:15
2.	"Minority of One"	4:18
3.	"Cross of Babylon"	4:51
4.	"Hellblazer"	3:59
5.	"Live as One Already Dead"	5:39
6.	"The Fateful Dark"	6:27
7.	"Zero Hour"	6:33
8.	"Hammered Down"	4:11
9.	"Scavengers of Mercy"	5:04
10.	"The Cursed Earth"	4:48
Total length:		52:05

iTunes bonus tracks
No.	Title	Length
11.	"Be Quick or Be Dead" (Iron Maiden cover)	3:28
12.	"Lightning to the Nations" (Diamond Head cover)	4:31
13.	"Killers" (Motörhead cover)	4:10
Total length:		64:14

Earache Webstore Bonus CD
No.	Title	Length
1.	"Be Quick or Be Dead" (Iron Maiden cover)	3:28
2.	"Lightning to the Nations" (Diamond Head cover)	4:31
3.	"Killers" (Motörhead cover)	4:10
Total length:		12:09

== Personnel ==
=== Savage Messiah ===
- Dave Silver – vocals, guitar
- Joff Bailey – guitar
- Stefano Selvatico – Bass guitar
- Andrea Gorio – Drums

=== Additional musicians ===
- Jon Ewen – Additional keyboards on "Live as One" and "Zero Hour"

=== Additional personnel ===
- Scott Atkins – Production, mixing, engineering and mastering
