= The Injester =

- Origin: London, England
- Genres: Alternative metal; Post metal; Groove metal; Avant-garde metal; Hard rock
- Years active: 2018–present
- Labels: Transcend Music, Rock Records
- Members: Ashe; Skinface; Morax; Yorick; Grym; Auguste
- Past members: Baer; Old Sparky; Gaspard
- Website: theinjester.com

The Injester is a theatrical masked metal band with a macabre circus aesthetic. The members are anonymous and dress as sinister clowns based on their real personas. The band debuted at HammerfestXI in Prestatyn, Wales in March 2019 and went on to play the Bloodstock Open Air festival, Derby in August 2021 and the Dogtooth stage at Download at Donnington Park in June 2022. The music is a mix of heavy downtuned riffs, carnival key/samples, harmonised chorus and horror movie soundscape.

The band released the album A Spectacle to Behold on 28 October 2022 recorded at London Road studios in Baldock, England.

== Discography ==
=== Albums ===
- A Spectacle to Behold (2022)

=== Singles ===
- Introducing the Injester (Transcend Music, 2019)
- Jack's Box (2022)
- The Ligament Necklace (2022)

=== Music videos ===
- "Apophenia" (2020)
- "Jack's Box" (2022)
- "The Ligament Necklace" (2023)
