= Skull (album) =

Studio album by Evile
- Released: 27 May 2013
- Recorded: February 2013 at Parlour Studios, Kettering, England
- Genre: Thrash metal
- Length: 48:24; 52:12 (iTunes)
- Label: Earache, Century Media
- Producer: Russ Russell

Evile chronology
Five Serpent's Teeth (2011)	Skull (2013)	Hell Unleashed (2021)

Professional ratings
Review scores
Source	Rating
Lords of Metal	(84/100)

Skull is the fourth album by the British thrash metal band Evile, released on 27 May 2013 in Europe via Earache Records and in North America via Century Media/Earache Records. It is the last to feature lead vocalist and rhythm guitarist Matt Drake, who left Evile seven years after its release.

== Production ==
On 31 January 2013 Evile lead guitarist Ol Drake announced that the band would enter Parlour Studios with Russ Russell to begin recording their fourth album. The band finished recording on 1 March. On 25 March the band announced that the album would be released on 27 May.

== Track listing ==
All songs written by Matt Drake, Ol Drake, Joel Graham and Ben Carter.

No.	Title	Length
1.	"Underworld"	4:37
2.	"Skull"	6:31
3.	"The Naked Sun"	6:04
4.	"Head of the Demon"	4:24
5.	"Tomb"	7:26
6.	"Words of the Dead"	4:16
7.	"Outsider"	3:37
8.	"What You Become"	4:54
9.	"New Truths, Old Lies"	6:35

iTunes bonus track
No.	Title	Length
10.	"A Sinister Call"	3:48

Earache Records Webstore bonus CD
No.	Title	Length
1.	"Words of the Dead" (Alternate Solo Mix)	4:20
2.	"Outsider" (Alternate Solo Mix)	3:27

Amazon bonus track
No.	Title	Length
10.	"New Truths, Old Lies" (Extended Version)	7:21

Google Play bonus track
No.	Title	Length
10.	"Tomb" (Alternate Solo Mix)	7:32

== Personnel ==
=== Band members ===
- Matt Drake – lead vocals, rhythm guitar
- Ol Drake – lead guitar
- Joel Graham – bass guitar
- Ben Carter – drums

=== Additional personnel ===
- Russ Russell – production
- Eliran Kantor – artwork
