= Joel Graham =

English bassist

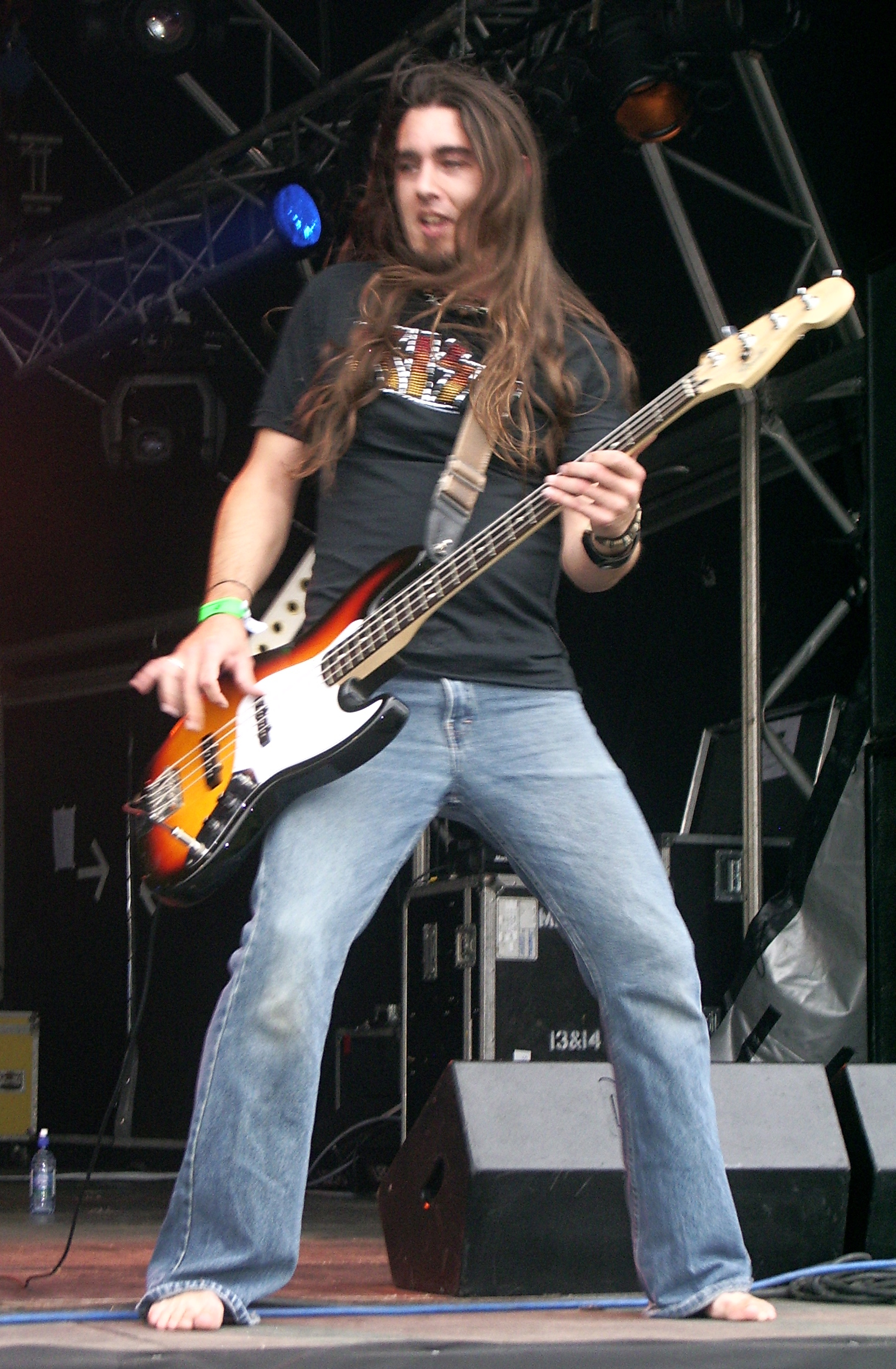
- Graham performing in 2007

Background information
- Born: 10 February 1977 (age 48)
- Genres: Thrash metal, heavy metal
- Occupation: Bassist
- Member of: Evile
- Formerly of: Rise to Addiction
- Website: evile.co.uk

Joel Graham is the bassist of English thrash metal band Evile and former bassist of metal band Rise to Addiction.

== Biography ==
Graham was born on 10 February 1977 in Dewsbury, England. He was strongly influenced and supported by his parents from a young age to enjoy music and was taken to rock shows from the age of 7 to see such bands as Queen, Iron Maiden and Bruce Springsteen. Graham started playing Bass as his main instrument in 1988 playing in local bands around the West Yorkshire area. He moved to Nottingham in 1999 and helped form the stoner rock band Ninedenine who released the highly praised Scars E.P in 2001. During this time he also worked at Earache Records processing orders for the label's then-first webstore.

In May 2004, Graham moved to Kenora in Northwest Ontario, Canada where he spent time volunteering in the First Nations community.

=== Rise to Addiction ===
In 2006, Graham returned to his birth town of Dewsbury and replaced Rob Naylor as the bassist of Rise to Addiction. Graham co-wrote and played on the albums A New Shade of Black for the Soul 2007 and Some Other Truth 2009.

=== Evile ===
On 16 December 2009, Graham was announced as the replacement for Mike Alexander, the founding Evile bassist who died whilst on tour in Sweden on 5 October 2009. Graham played his first show with Evile on 14 January 2010 at Cardiff Barfly, also the same day his daughter was born. After a long intensive tour through the United States in 2010, he began recording the third Evile album Five Serpent's Teeth. This is the first Evile album to feature him as the bass player, although the re-dux edition of Infected Nations released in 2010 contained a bonus disc of live material which featured him playing bass.

=== Writing ===
In early 2014, Graham joined Bass Guitar Magazine as a reviewer and contributing writer.

== Playing style ==
Joel Graham uses both a finger-picking style and a plectrum when performing, although his preferred style is finger-picking. Graham mainly uses the alternate two-finger (index and middle finger) picking style, but he performs a speedy three-finger roll style (made famous by bassist Billy Sheehan) during faster songs such as "Descent into Madness" and "Long Live New Flesh". He uses a plectrum for all songs originally performed by Mike Alexander, commenting in several interviews that he wanted to play those songs just as Alexander did.

== Influences ==
Graham has cited bassists including Steve Harris, John Entwistle, Cliff Burton, Billy Sheehan, Les Claypool, Scott Reeder, Pat Badger, Frank Bello and John Deacon as influences.

== Discography ==
=== Rise to Addiction ===
- A New Shade of Black for the Soul (Mausoleum) 2007
- Some Other Truth (Mausoleum) 2009

=== Evile ===
- Infected Nations redux edition, disc 2 (Earache Records) 2010
- Five Serpent's Teeth (Earache Records) 2011
- Skull (Earache Records) 2013
- Hell Unleashed (Napalm Records) 2021
- The Unknown (Napalm Records) 2023
