= Five Serpent's Teeth =

Studio album by Evile
- Released: 26 September 2011
- Recorded: March–April 2011 at Parlour Studios, Kettering, England
- Genre: Thrash metal
- Length: 53:22
- Label: Earache
- Producer: Russ Russell

Evile chronology
Infected Nations (2009)	Five Serpent's Teeth (2011)	Skull (2013)

Singles from Five Serpent's Teeth
- 1. "Eternal Empire" Released: 5 June 2011; 2. "Cult" Released: 12 September 2011; 3. "In Memoriam" Released: 6 June 2012

Professional ratings
Review scores
Source	Rating
Kerrang!	4/5 stars
Metal Hammer	9/10 stars
Q Magazine	8/10 stars
Revolver	3.5/5 stars
Rock Sound	8/10 stars
The Quietus	8/10 stars
Thrash Hits	5/6 stars
Yell Magazine	3/5 stars

Five Serpent's Teeth is the third album by the English thrash metal band Evile. It was released on 26 September 2011 in Europe and on 18 October 2011 in North America The album was produced by Russ Russell (Napalm Death, Dimmu Borgir) at Parlour Studios, Kettering, England. It is the first album not to feature original bassist Mike Alexander, who died while on tour just weeks after the release of Infected Nations. It is the first album to feature bassist Joel Graham. On 6 June, the band posted a new song, "Eternal Empire", on their YouTube Channel. The album's full track listing was announced on 21 June 2011 and the album's artwork was unveiled on 6 July 2011.

== Writing and recording ==
On 31 May 2010, Evile revealed that they'd begun working on their third studio album. Ol Drake confirmed this via TwitLonger on 9 November 2010 and wrote that "Album 3 is well on the way and will be out on Earache Records in mid 2011".

On 9 February 2011, the band debuted a new song at a show in Manchester under the working title of "Bitch". On the weekend of 19 March, Evile entered the studio to begin recording the album with producer Russ Russell. During the recording process, the band also periodically posted videos from the studio. On 25 April, the band announced that their 3rd album was fully mixed and awaiting mastering.

In May 2011 Evile announced that they would pay tribute to their fallen bandmate, Mike Alexander, on the latest album. The track was entitled "In Memoriam". Ol Drake commented:

It goes without saying that there would be some element of the new album which was for Mike alone. We had a few ideas floating around which were out of the ordinary for Evile, and when Mike passed away those ideas just started to make more and more sense. "In Memoriam"'s initial intention was for Mike and Mike alone. All of us in the band have different views and thoughts on what the song means and who it is for, but it was born out of a want to include something special for Mike, his family and ourselves. As the song grew it started to take on a life of its own, so to speak. It is for anyone who's lost anyone close to them. There is a lot of meaning behind this song, and I expect a few people will question Evile doing such a song, but if the sentiment isn't understood, I couldn't care less. As our producer, Russ Russell said: "It's a brilliant song for a brilliant guy."

== Release and promotion ==
On 19 March 2011 "Eternal Empire" was debuted live at Hammerfest in Prestatyn, Wales.

On 5 May, Evile announced that the name of the new album was Five Serpent's Teeth. The song "In Memoriam" is a tribute to late bassist Mike Alexander, with the main bass riff coming from something he played during sound checks. Matt and Ol's father, Tony Drake, also played guitar on this track. On 11 June 2011 "Cult" was debuted live at the Download Festival in Donington Park, England. On 23 June 2011 "Xaraya" and "Long Live New Flesh" were debuted live at Gibson Guitar Studios in London, England to invited press and competition winners.

On 12 September 2011 the album's first single/music video, "Cult", was released. The video saw a different, more modern approach. Matt Drake stated:

As we have often said, we like to do things a bit differently and occasionally side-step the typical or obvious, so here is our video for the first single, "Cult", from our new album, "Five Serpent's Teeth".

Ol Drake stated:

"Cult" is quite a solid, stomping song, so we wanted something to capture that visually without the typical "shaking" effect

In April 2012 Evile announced they would start filming a music video for the track "In Memoriam". Ol Drake commented:

The initial idea was to release the "Cult" video, as we did, then immediately get onto recording the video for "In Memoriam"; this was easier said than done. It's been well documented why the song exists. When it came to getting the "right"/"appropriate" treatment for the video, it was a lengthy process. The song is so close to all of us that we wanted to make sure the video complemented the song and its subject matter, and that all four of us were happy with how the song will be portrayed visually. If we'd have settled on the first idea after "Cult", we wouldn't have been happy, so amidst touring and gigging, we've been working hard on getting this 100% before we move on to the next video. The song is basically about loss, which we can all relate to, so we wanted to express that in the video, while staying respectful to why the song exists. We can't wait to get this filmed and out there for all to enjoy!

Five Serpent's Teeth sold roughly 680 copies in the United States in its first week of release, landing it at No. 35 on the Top New Artist Albums (Heatseekers) chart, which lists the best-selling albums by new and developing artists, defined as those who have never appeared in the top 100 of the Billboard 200.

Evile's previous album, Infected Nations, opened with around 460 units to debut at No. 132 on the Heatseekers chart.

== Title ==
At the special show in London at the Gibson Guitar Studios, Matt Drake revealed the title to be from Alfred Bester's The Demolished Man on which the meaning of Evile's "Now Demolition" is also based. An excerpt from The Demolished Man, containing the title, can be read below:

He looked from the cartridges to Reich. "Five serpent's teeth to give to Gus." "I told you this was innocent," Reich said in a hard voice." We'll have to pull those teeth."

== Track listing ==
All music by Evile and all lyrics by Matt Drake, except where noted.

No.	Title	Length
1.	"Five Serpent's Teeth"	5:34
2.	"In Dreams of Terror"	5:07
3.	"Cult"	4:50
4.	"Eternal Empire"	5:35
5.	"Xaraya"	6:02
6.	"Origin of Oblivion"	4:55
7.	"Centurion"	5:44
8.	"In Memoriam (lyrics: Ol Drake. music: Evile and Mike Alexander)"	5:47
9.	"Descent into Madness"	4:25
10.	"Long Live New Flesh (music: Evile and Mike Alexander)"	5:16

== Credits ==
=== Band members ===
- Matt Drake – lead vocals, rhythm guitar, 2nd and 4th guitar solos on "Long Live New Flesh"
- Ol Drake – lead guitar
- Joel Graham – bass guitar
- Ben Carter – drums

=== Guest appearances ===
- Mike Alexander – co-writing on "In Memoriam" and "Long Live New Flesh"
- Tony Drake – first guitar solo on "In Memoriam"
- Brian Posehn – backing vocals on "Cult"
