= Plague of Conscience =

Studio album by Savage Messiah
- Released: 23 February 2012
- Recorded: Grindstone Studios, Suffolk, England
- Genre: Thrash metal, heavy metal
- Length: 53:16; 56:46 (iTunes)
- Label: Earache Records
- Producer: Scott Atkins

Savage Messiah chronology
Insurrection Rising (2009)	Plague of Conscience (2012)	The Fateful Dark (2014)

Plague of Conscience is the second studio album from British Heavy metal band Savage Messiah, and their first release through Earache Records.

== Production ==
The music and lyrics for the album were written by Dave Silver, and pre-production took place at Station Studios in London, England between August 2010 and June 2011.

The band recorded the album at Grindstone Studios in Suffolk, England between July and September 2011, once again working with producer Scott Atkins, who had worked with the band mixing and engineering their previous album, Insurrection Rising.

== Release ==
The album was released on 23 February 2012 by Earache Records and made available in standard CD format, a limited run of 1,000 vinyl (400 on Black vinyl, 300 on Fear Red vinyl, 200 Radioactive Green vinyl, 100 Plague Pink vinyl) and for free download via Earache Records website. An official video for "All Seeing I" was released in December 2012.

== Track listing ==
No.	Title	Length
1.	"Plague of Conscience"	5:31
2.	"Six Feet Under the Gun"	5:01
3.	"Carnival of Souls"	6:01
4.	"In Thought Alone"	4:36
5.	"All Seeing I"	5:09
6.	"Beyond a Shadow of a Doubt"	4:09
7.	"Architects of Fear"	5:13
8.	"The Accuser"	4:04
9.	"Shadowbound"	4:50
10.	"The Mask of Anarchy"	8:38

iTunes bonus track
No.	Title	Length
11.	"Form Follows Function"	3:30

== Personnel ==
- Dave Silver - Guitars and vocals
- Joff Bailey - Guitars
- Stefano Selvatico - Bass
- Mauricio Chamucero - Drums
