= Glyder (band) =

- Origin: Wicklow, Ireland
- Genres: Hard rock
- Years active: 2004–2010, 2011–
- Labels: SPV/Steamhammer; Bad Reputation Records; True Talent Records
- Members: Jackie Robinson; Bat Kinane; Peter Fisher; Graham McClatchie; Des McEvoy
- Past members: Tony Cullen; Davy Ryan

Glyder are a hard rock band from Ballyknockan, County Wicklow, Ireland.

== History ==
Later another band was formed in 2004 after a one-off gig at "The Vibe for Philo" in Dublin. Originally called Hollywood, the band toured Ireland with Thin Lizzy. An EP was released in February 2004 called Black Tide Silver Path and the band convinced producer Chris Tsangarides, who worked with Thin Lizzy, Black Sabbath, Judas Priest and Ozzy Osbourne, to record their self-titled debut album.

The album was released through French label Bad Reputation Records in April 2006 and was critically acclaimed in the UK and Europe.

A '5K' Kerrang live review, a '4K' album review, reviews, and coverage in nearly every rock magazine in Europe, established Glyder as an international hard rock act.

Glyder hit the airwaves in the summer of 2006 with regular airplay on the Bruce Dickinson BBC6 rock show. The track "PUP" was playlisted on most UK rock shows from XFM and Total Rock to BBC, and tracks were played on Norwegian, Swedish, and UK national radio, as well as independent radio stations all over the world.

Glyder toured Ireland with The Answer during the summer of 2006, and did their first UK headline tour in October 2006. During 2006 Glyder also opened for W.A.S.P., Bob Catley, Wishbone Ash and shared stages with Eric Bell and Brian Robertson.

In November 2006 Glyder won a text competition to open for UK Rock stalwarts Thunder on three dates of their UK tour. Also in 2006, the band played as the opening act of a small headline tour of the UK with Manchester band Fury UK .In January 2007 Glyder announced they were to tour Europe with Thunder.

In 2008, they released their second studio album, Playground for Life, on True Talent Records.

In March 2008 they toured with Fish in the UK. In May/June 2008 Glyder toured Scandinavia with Gotthard, opened for Dio in Stockholm and played the Gibson tent at Sweden Rock Festival. In September they opened for Blue Öyster Cult in France, and played the Raismes festival in France with Saxon and Y&T. They then continued to the UK with Y&T as special guests. Glyder headlined an eight date tour in Spain before they headlined at the biggest Indian college rock festival, Synchronicity at IIT Kanpur, India . In December Glyder opened the Classic Rock stage at Hard Rock Hell 2 in Wales.

In August 2009 Glyder opened for Metallica in Marlay Park Dublin.

Most of 2009 was spent writing and recording the third Glyder album, "Yesterday, Today and Tomorrow". The band was signed to SPV/steamhammer after they heard some cuts from the album. The album was released in March 2010 and featured a guest solo from Y&T's Dave Meniketti on the title track.

In June 2010 they opened for Slash in Vicar St Dublin. On the same day the band reached the number 1 spot on 89.5 FM WSOU, the college radio station of Seton Hall University, New Jersey. WSOU is considered by some to be the most influential hard rock and metal college radio station in the U.S., and was recently named the United States No. 1 college radio station by Playboy Magazine. Alice Cooper also took to the band and played an exclusive track on his "Nights with Alice Cooper" show that was syndicated all over the US and the world. Rick Wakeman also played the band on his show on Planet Rock and has supported the band since he first heard "Love never Dies" on the "Weather the Storm" EP.

Due to financial strains and frustration with the music business, singer/bassist Tony Cullen and Drummer Davy Ryan quit the band. The band reformed in January 2011, with Jackie Robinson, Graham McClatchie and Des McEvoy joining the band.

The fourth album, titled "Backroads to Byzantium", was written by Kinane, Fisher and Robinson, using home recording software and a few gmail accounts; due to Robinson living in Northern Ireland, rehearsals were not practical. The album was recorded in April 2011 in Bluebird Studios, Straffan, Co Kildare, and mixed by Peter Brander in Mediasound studios in Copenhagen, Denmark. It was due for release on SPV/Steamhammer in Oct 2011.

== Discography ==
=== Albums: Studio LPs ===
- 2006 Glyder
- 2008 Playground for Life
- 2010 Yesterday, Today & Tomorrow
- 2011 Backroads to Byzantium

=== Compilations ===
- 2011 Black Pearl – A Collection of Rough Diamonds (LP)

=== Single and Extended Plays ===
- 2004 Lucky Strike (SP)
- 2005 Black Tide Silver Path (EP)
- 2008 Weather the Storm (EP)
