= A Light Shines =

A Light Shines...

EP by Sacred Mother Tongue
- Released: September 3, 2012
- Recorded: 2012
- Genre: Heavy metal
- Length: 17:10
- Label: Transcend Records / EMI Label Services

Sacred Mother Tongue chronology
The Ruin of Man (2009)	A Light Shines... (2012)	Out of the Darkness (2013)

Singles from A Light Shines...
- 1. "Evolve/Become" Released: 2012

A Light Shines is the first collection of recordings from Sacred Mother Tongue released in association with EMI Label Services and their first release since Ruin of Man in 2009. The EP was the precursor to their Out of the Darkness album, released in 2013, and contains the single "Evolve/Become".

== Reception ==
Professional ratings
Review scores
Source	Rating
Metal Hammer	8/10 stars
Kerrang	3/5 stars
Rock Sound	6/10 stars
Big Cheese	4/5 stars
Metal Rules	4/5 stars
This Is Not A Scene	9/10 stars
Power Play	7/10 stars

Metal Hammer gave the EP 8/10, calling it an "anthem loaded, stadium bothering masterclass". Kerrang! magazine awarded the EP 3 Ks stating that it set the band up well for the forthcoming album.

== Track listing ==
All tracks are written by Andy James, Darrin South, Josh Gurner and Lee Newell.

No.	Title	Length
1.	"Evolve/Become"	3:52
2.	"Bleeding Out"	4:14
3.	"Seven"	4:33
4.	"The City Is Crying (Live from China)"	4:32
Total length:		17:10

== Personnel ==
Sacred Mother Tongue

- Darrin South – vocals
- Andy James – lead guitar
- Josh Gurner – bass guitar
- Lee Newell – drums

== Music videos ==
- "Evolve/Become" video 2012 on YouTube
- "Seven" lyrics video 2012 on YouTube
- "Bleeding Out" live at Islington Academy 2012 on YouTube
