= Playground for Life =

Studio album by Glyder
- Released: 2008
- Recorded: 2007
- Genre: Hard rock
- Length: 39:59
- Label: True Talent Records
- Producer: Alwyn Walker, Glyder

Glyder chronology
| Glyder (2006) | Playground for Life (2008) | Yesterday, Today & Tomorrow (2012) |

Professional ratings
Review scores
| Source | Rating |
|---|---|
| Allmusic | 3/5 stars |

Playground for Life is the second studio album by Irish hard rock band Glyder.

== Track listing ==
All tracks written by Cullen/Kinane/Fisher/Ryan

1. "Gambler's Blues" - 4:57
2. "Sweets" - 3:30
3. "Puppet Queen" - 3:48
4. "Playground for Life" - 4:34
5. "For Your Skin" - 4:19
6. "Walking My Own Ground" - 3:24
7. "Dark Meets Light" - 3:49
8. "Sleeping Gun" - 3:23
9. "Over and Over" - 3:38
10. "The Merrygoround" - 4:37

== Personnel ==
- Tony Cullen - Lead Vocals; Bass Guitars
- Bat Kinane - Lead/Rhythm Guitars; Backing Vocals
- Peter Fisher - Lead/Rhythm Guitars
- Davy Ryan - Drums
- Alwyn Walker - Producer, Slide Guitars (Track 10); Keyboards (3,4,7 and 9)
- Chris Tsangarides - Keyboards (5,8 and 10)
