= OL Drake =

British guitarist and singer

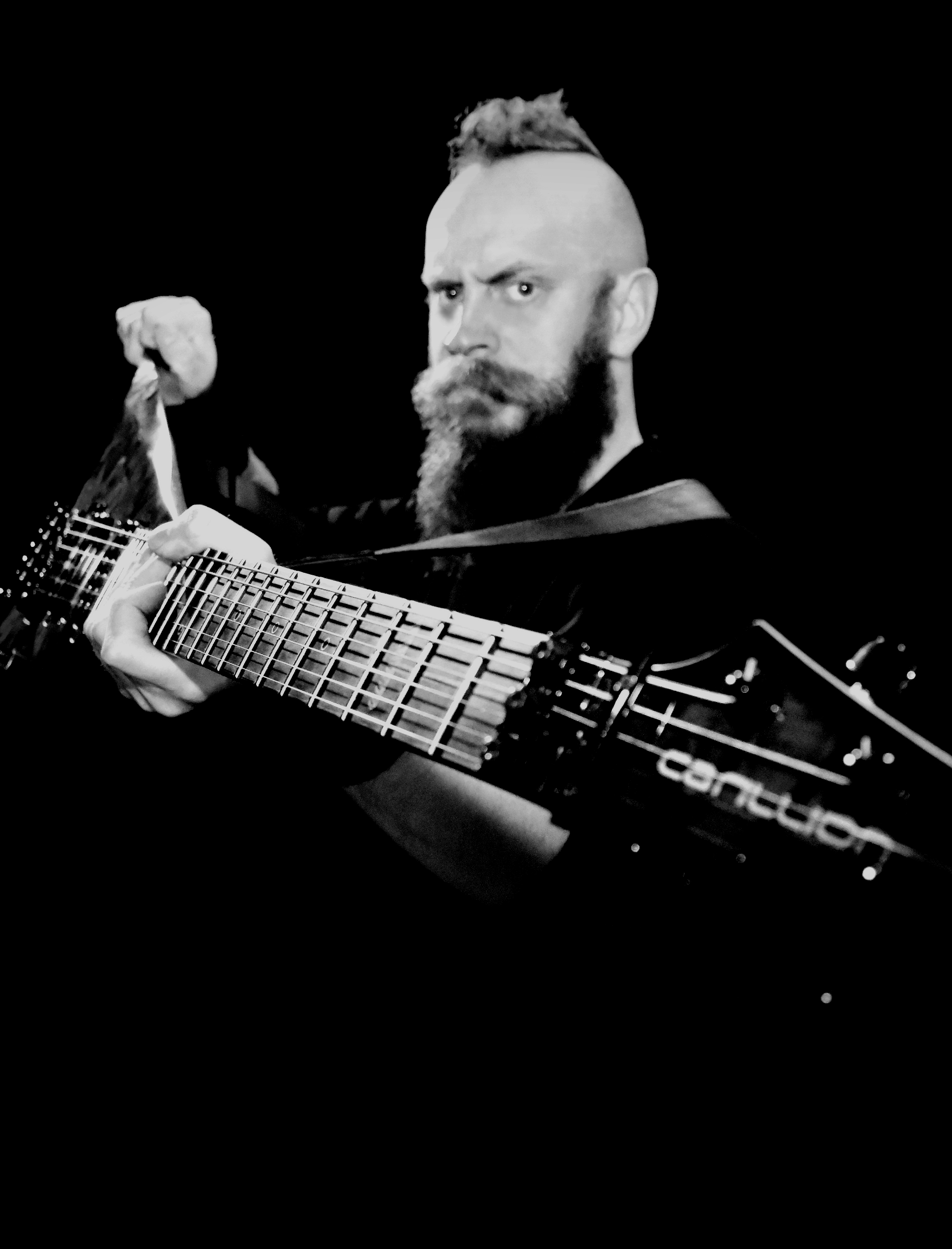
- OL Drake in 2021

Background information
- Also known as: Ol Drake, OL Drake, Old Rake, Twatticus Maximus
- Born: Oliver Michael Drake; 28 March 1984 (age 41); Huddersfield, England
- Genres: Thrash metal
- Occupation: Musician
- Instrument(s): Guitar, vocals
- Years active: 1999–2015, 2018–present
- Website: evilecult.com

Oliver Michael Drake (born 28 March 1984), known as Ol Drake, Old Rake or OL Drake, is an English musician, most notably the vocalist and lead guitarist of the thrash metal band Evile.

== Biography ==
Drake and his brother, Matt, were brought up in a musical environment, with the sound of Camel, Guns N' Roses and The Jimi Hendrix Experience. Drake's father, Tony, played guitar from a young age and played in many local bands. Matt, having received classical guitar lessons when young, obtained a Fender copy electric guitar for a birthday, and also being a fan of Metallica and the guitar, OL was intrigued by the songs and the guitar. Matt started OL on the path of heavy metal by introducing him to the music of Metallica. Drake, then aged 16, picked up Matt's guitar when possible and taught himself from then on.

When Drake reached music college, he developed an interest in music theory, jazz and classical music, which opened up his playing and progress on the guitar. He also developed an interest and skill in playing drums.

He spent several years notating guitar tablature for the majority of Annihilator's back catalogue. Jeff Waters, impressed by his work, dedicated a page on the Annihilator website to his tabs.

Drake made a guest appearance on The Berzerker bassist Sam Bean's solo project The Senseless, performing a guest solo on the track "Promise".

In December 2008, Drake paid tribute to the late Chuck Schuldiner, by posting a cover of Death's "Voice of the Soul" online, along with a video slideshow of Schuldiner related images.

In September 2009, Schmier from Destruction asked Drake to stand in for their guitarist, Mike Sifringer, who broke his fingers forcing Destruction to find a temporary replacement, for their performance at Portugal's Caos Emergente Festival.

At the UK's Sonisphere Festival at Knebworth in 2010 OL joined comedian Tim Minchin on stage for his track "Rock N Roll Nerd".

OL appeared as a guest on Destruction's 2011 album Day of Reckoning stating that it was "An experience I'll never forget". On 29 June 2011 OL revealed the solos which he contributed are as follows: "The Price" (1:09-1:20, 2:09-2:15 and 2:23-2:29), "Devil's Advocate" (3:08-3:21), "Sorcerer of Black Magic" (2:36-3:14), "Sheep of the Regime" (4:06-fade) and "Stand Up and Shout (Dio Cover)" (1:25-1:52 and 2:28-end).

In May 2012, OL was nominated in the "Dimebag Darrell Shredder" Award as part of the Metal Hammer Golden Gods Awards.

== Evile ==
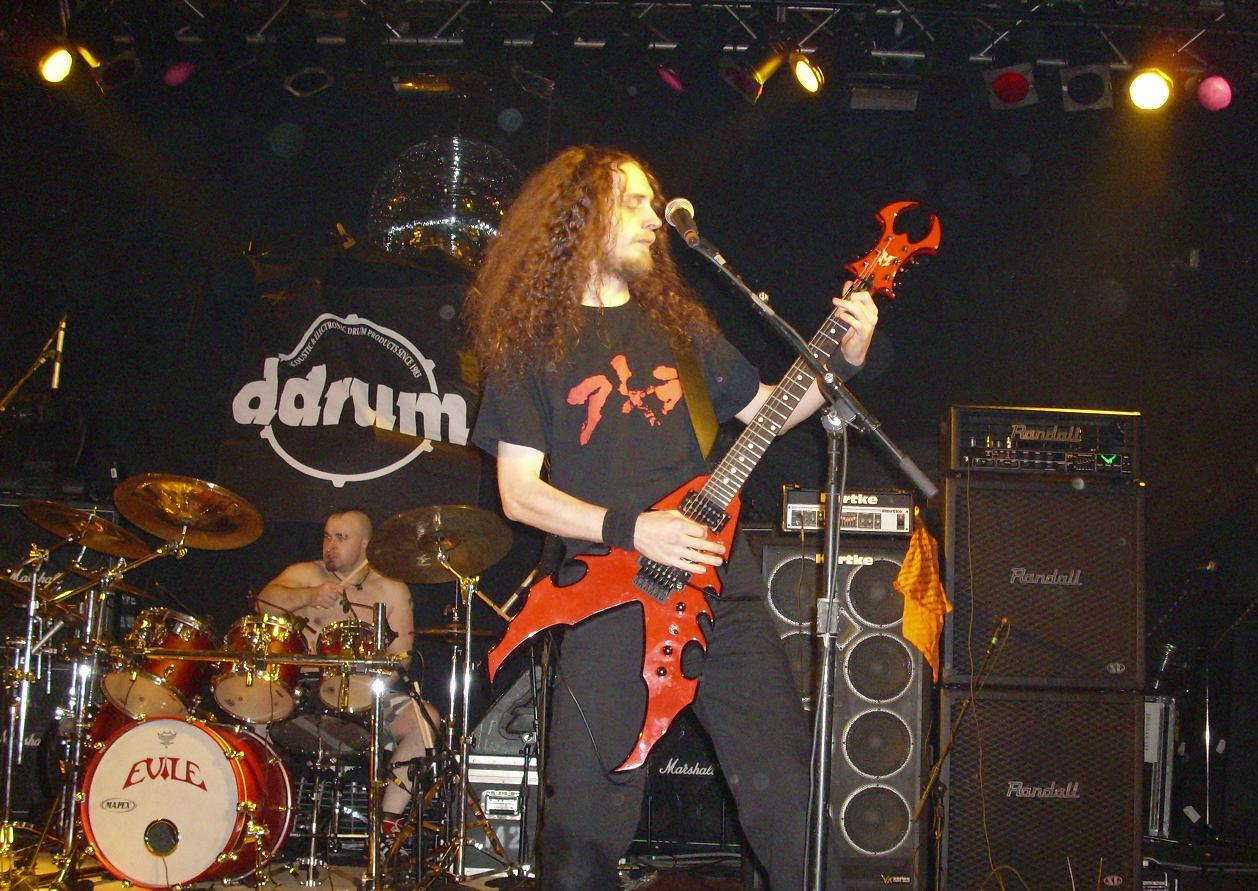
OL Drake performing in 2008

In 2000, Matt Drake and Ben Carter got together to form a covers band. As Drake had advanced on the guitar by this time, they asked him to join the band. After bassist Mike Alexander joined, they played many shows together over the next few years.

After school Matt Drake and Carter would get together and jam their favourite Metal tracks, mostly being Metallica, Megadeth and Slayer songs. A jam took place in an old church in Honley. Drake came along one day and was impressed with how loud and powerful it was, having never experienced live music before. After months of practicing, Drake had learned some Metallica solos, and asked if he could join in. From the first rehearsal together he was hooked on being in a band, and he knew what he wanted to do.

Inspired by James Hetfield, Drake's parents would drive him across the UK to locate an ESP Explorer guitar. He decided this was not the guitar for him, and settled for a BC Rich Jr V. He would use the BC Rich for every show from then on, borrowing his father's Ibanez guitars as a backup.

They would go on to play live in the local areas under the name Metal Militia, Drake taking on the role of lead guitarist, though after three or four years, this grew stale for the band, forcing them to eventually go on to form Evile in 2003. Original songs would feature in the live set, with positive results.

In 2004, they formed Evile. They recorded an EP All Hallows Eve in 2004 (which contained an instrumental track by Drake named "Torment") and a demo Hell Demo in 2006. Soon after, the band signed to Earache Records and recorded their debut album, Enter the Grave, produced by Flemming Rasmussen. He was also responsible for conceptualising the album art for Enter the Grave.

Drake plays and endorses Moser Custom Shop Guitars, Randall Amplifiers, Ernie Ball Strings and Homebrew Electronics Pedals.

He performs all guitar solos with Evile, with the exception of a solo in "We Who Are About to Die" and two solos in "Long Live New Flesh", which were played by his brother.

On 19 November 2008, while on tour in Europe with Satyricon, Drake collapsed due to health issues. His jaw was fractured and the underside of his chin was cut open. Evile were forced to cancel their appearances on the remainder of the tour. He then had to have his jaw wired shut for two weeks for healing.

On 30 August 2013, OL announced that he was leaving Evile due to becoming detached from the band and touring scene. He said, "I've reached a point where I want a family/kids, a house, a steady and definite income and everything in between, and in regard to my personal preferences, a touring band's income and uncertainties, in the state that I feel they would continue to be in, has become incompatible with how I feel and what I want/need".

"Huge apologies to anyone this disappoints, but I have to do what makes sense to me. I am not quitting writing or playing; I do plan on continuing to record and write my own music (solo project, general composing/recording etc), I just won't be touring etc".

In December 2013, it was announced that OL Drake had begun recording and will be releasing his debut solo album in 2014 under Earache Records titled Old Rake. In March 2014 he collaborated with Skindred drummer Arya Goggin as well as Eddy Temple-Morris, dubstep producer Rednek and grime rapper Beaupierre in a new Jägermeister UK backed project called "REABO".

In April 2018, Evile announced that OL was returning to the band after a five-year absence. He, along with Evile, then began to write their 5th album (which would become Hell Unleashed) in October 2018.

== Solo ==
On 10 December 2013, Drake announced he had signed a deal with Earache Records/Century Media with James Murphy (Death, Testament, Obituary,) mixing the album. His debut record, entitled "Old Rake" is slated for release on 22 June in Europe and 23 June in North America. Guests on the album include Gary Holt (Exodus, Slayer), James Murphy, and Josh Middleton (Sylosis). Mike Heller (Malignancy, Fear Factory, System Divide) plays drums on the entire album.

== Influences ==
Drake has cited guitarists including Jeff Waters, Marty Friedman, Kirk Hammett, Alex Skolnick, Dimebag Darrell, Chuck Schuldiner, Jimi Hendrix, Slash and Andrew Latimer as influences.

== Discography ==
=== Evile ===
- All Hallows Eve EP (self-released) 2004
- Hell Demo (self-released) 2006
- Enter the Grave (Earache Records) 2007
- Infected Nations (Earache Records) 2009
- Five Serpent's Teeth (Earache Records) 2011
- Skull (Earache Records) 2013
- Hell Unleashed (Napalm Records) 2021
- The Unknown (Napalm Records) 2023

=== Solo ===
- "Old Rake" (Earache Records) 2015

== Equipment ==
=== Guitars ===
- Carillion Kingslayer "Rake" Custom

=== Gear ===
- Kemper Profiling Amplifier
- Seymour Duncan Pickups
- Winspear Instrumental Guitar Picks
- Winspear Instrumental Strings (46-9)
