= Spitting Venom =

EP by Savage Messiah
- Released: 1 October 2007
- Recorded: Sable Rose Studios, Coventry, England (February – May 2007)
- Genre: Heavy metal, thrash metal
- Length: 32:06
- Label: SMR Productions
- Producer: Andy Faulkner

Savage Messiah chronology
Spitting Venom (2007)	Insurrection Rising (2009)

Professional ratings
Review scores
Source	Rating
Allmusic	3/5 stars
Metalcrypt	(4.25/5)
Metal-rules	4.5/5 stars
Revelationz	8/10 stars

Spitting Venom is the debut, self-released EP from English heavy metal band Savage Messiah. It was released on 1 October 2007 on SMR Productions.

== Track listing ==
All tracks are written by Savage Messiah

No.	Title	Length
1.	"Spitting Venom"	4:08
2.	"Frontline"	3:58
3.	"Servant to Your Death"	3:29
4.	"Heavens Gate"	5:19
5.	"W.D.U." (a.k.a. "Watch Death Unfold")	3:01
6.	"Conspiracy in Silence"	4:43
7.	"In for the Kill"	3:58
8.	"In Cold Blood" (Demo bonus track)	3:27
Total length:		32:06
