= Carcer City (band) =

English metalcore band

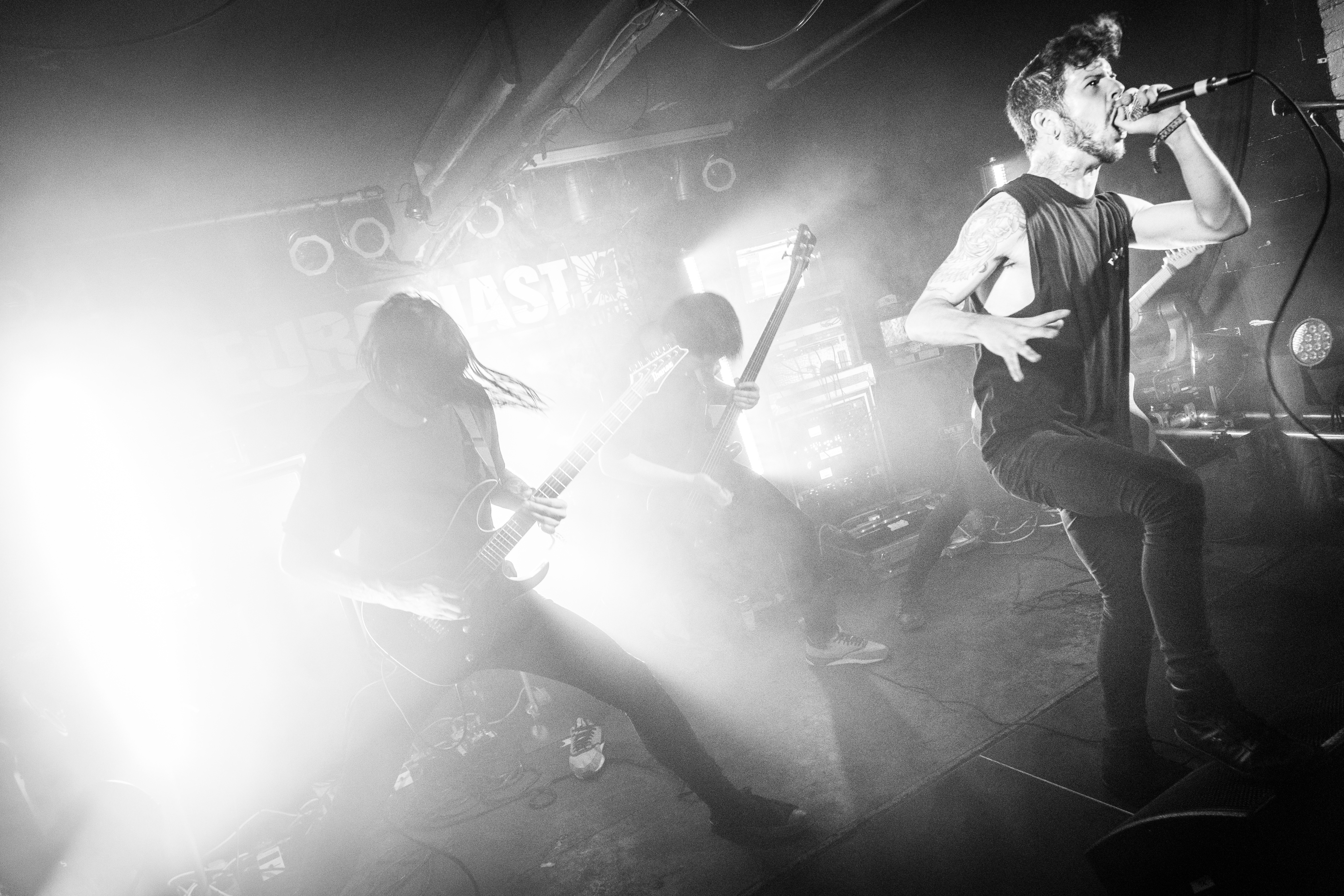
- Carcer City live in 2016

Background information
- Origin: Liverpool, UK
- Genres: Metalcore, progressive metalcore
- Years active: 2007–2019
- Labels: Stay Sick, Transcend
- Past members: Patrick Pinion; Antony 'Yacka' Moss; Bradley Ratcliffe; Lewis Hughes; Ollie Rooney; Steve Anderson; Karl Riley; Ollie Graham; Joss Gilbert; Owen Randles
- Website: carcercity.co.uk

Carcer City were an English metalcore band from Liverpool. In total, they released three EPs and three full-length albums. They toured both nationally and internationally with well-known English and American metalcore bands such as While She Sleeps, Hacktivist, Loathe, Still Remains, Attila, the Word Alive, and more.

Formed in 2007, they played their final headline show on 14 April 2019 at The Black Heart in Camden, London. They made their final appearance at Techfest festival 2019.

The band got its name from the fictional video game setting of the same name, featured in the Manhunt and Grand Theft Auto video games. However, in interviews Patrick has elaborated that they also chose it for its meaning in Latin as "prison city" which resonated with them because they always wanted to "break out" of their home city and become an international band.

== History ==
The band met in college during 2007. They released their first EP In The Wake of Ruin shortly after. In 2009, they released a second EP: Affliction. The band's first music video was released for the song I Hope You're Left With Nothing. They released their first full-length album The Life We Have Chosen in November 2009 after being signed to Transcend Music. Their second full-length album, The Road Journals, was released as a free download in 2012 to those who tweeted about it. A small number were also made physically. This album was written while on tour from the previous album The Life We Have Chosen.

In 2013, they released a single, "The Process", as a free download with accompanying music video. While touring in Austria, they were left stranded when they were involved in a van crash. There were no major injuries.

On 7 May 2016 the band announced they had signed to Staysick Recordings and announced a new album, Infinite//Unknown, and released a music video of the same name. The construction of this album, from chord progression to track placement was partly done based on the vocalist's condition called Grapheme-color synesthesia - specifically colour-graphimic syesthesia - which causes him to write and arrange music in colours. Aaron Matts, from Betraying the Martyrs, features on the track "Perceptions". The album was met with positive reviews from critics.

On 8 February 2019 the band announced their farewell tour across the UK with support from Last Hounds and a final EP, Silent War, which was self-released by the band, with a video made for the track, "Replicant".

== Musical style and influences ==
Carcer City's music style has often been described as progressive metalcore with atmospheric and electronic elements. The band create their own album artwork for each release.

They have cited as an influence by Loathe.

== Discography ==
Carcer City discography
- Studio albums: 3
- EPs: 3
- Music videos: 9

Studio Albums

Year	Name	Label
2009	The Life We Have Chosen	Transcend Music: Format: CD, music download
2012	The Road Journals	Self-release: Format: CD, music download
2016	Infinite//Unknown	Staysick Recordings: Format: CD, music download

Extended Plays

Year	Name	Label
2008	In the Wake of Ruin	Self-release: Format: CD, music download
2009	Affliction	Self-release: Format: CD, music download
2019	Silent War	Self-release: Format: CD, music download

Music videos/Singles

Year	Name
2008	"I Hope You're Left With Nothing"
2012	"Mistakes I Have to Live With"
2012	"The Road Journals"
2012	"Disaronno Lips"
2012	"If We Make It Home"
2013	"The Process"
2014	"Perceptions"
2016	"Infinite//Unknown"
2016	"Sovereign"
2019	"Replicant"
