= Out of the Darkness (Sacred Mother Tongue album) =

Studio album by Sacred Mother Tongue
- Released: April 15, 2013
- Recorded: 2012
- Genre: Heavy metal
- Label: Transcend Records / EMI Label Services

Sacred Mother Tongue chronology
A Light Shines (2012)	Out of the Darkness (2013)

Out of the Darkness is Sacred Mother Tongue's second album and their second release in association with EMI Label Services (the first being the EP A Light Shines in 2012). The album was released on April 15, 2013.

== Track listing ==
All tracks are written by Andy James, Darrin South, Josh Gurner and Lee Newell.

No.	Title	Length
1.	"Demons"
2.	"Bird in Hand"
3.	"Seven"
4.	"Pawn"
5.	"Bleeding Out"
6.	"A Light Will Shine"
7.	"The City Is Crying"
8.	"Just a Ride"
9.	"Evolve/Become"
10.	"Believe"

== Personnel ==
Sacred Mother Tongue

- Darrin South – vocals
- Andy James – lead guitar
- Josh Gurner – bass guitar
- Lee Newell – drums
