= Enter the Grave =

Enter The Grave

Studio album by Evile
- Released: 27 August 2007
- Recorded: 2007 at Sweet Silence Studios, Copenhagen, Denmark
- Genre: Thrash metal
- Length: 53:07
- Label: Earache
- Producer: Flemming Rasmussen

Evile chronology
Enter The Grave (2007)	Infected Nations (2009)

Enter the Grave is the debut album by the English thrash metal band Evile. Released on 27 August 2007 in Europe and on 25 September in North America and Japan, the album received generally favorable reviews and entered the UK Rock Chart at number 33. It was produced by Flemming Rasmussen and recorded at Sweet Silence Studios, Copenhagen, Denmark. Rasmussen had produced three Metallica albums, which raised the profile of the album's release. The track "Thrasher" was included on the 2008 Earache Thrash Pack, a downloadable selection of songs for the music video console game Rock Band.

The album's lyrics were inspired by films, and topics such as Countess Bathory, witch burnings, and thrash metal. Enter the Grave was re-released as a limited-edition "redux" version on 13 October 2008 in Europe and on 28 October in North America. According to the Huddersfield Daily Examiner, Enter the Grave had shifted 30,000 copies by September 2009.

== Recording ==
On 18 October 2006, Earache Records announced that it had signed a record contract with Evile. Looking for a producer for their debut album, the band decided they would send a request by email to producer Flemming Rasmussen "for a laugh"; Rasmussen had previously produced three Metallica albums; 1984's Ride the Lightning, 1986's Master of Puppets, and 1988's ...And Justice for All. Lead vocalist / rhythm guitarist Matt Drake typed Rasmussen's name into Google, and the first result returned was the producer's official website. Drake emailed Rasmussen asking if he would be interested. The producer replied a few days later, asking him to send several tracks. Drake emailed a number of mp3 files, but Rasmussen did not reply, leading Drake to worry that the producer "hated them, and thought they were shit." Earache Records subsequently emailed Rasmussen to formally ask if he would produce Evile's debut album, to which Rasmussen replied, "Yes". On 12 March 2007, his involvement was made public.

Pre-production with Rasmussen began on 28–29 April at Evile's Huddersfield, West Yorkshire rehearsal space. Soon after the band performed a live set at Tottenham Court Road, London's Fopp record store, which Rasmussen attended to observe Evile's live sound, and further gain a feel for the group's music. The album was recorded and mixed at Sweet Silence Studios, Copenhagen, Denmark. Enter the Grave was produced, engineered, mixed and mastered by Rasmussen, who also supplied additional backing vocals to title track "Enter the Grave". Anders H. Mortensen, meanwhile, acted as assistant engineer. Photographs taken during the album's recording sessions were posted at Evile's official MySpace blog, where fans were also invited to ask the band's members questions about the recording process for Enter the Grave.

"Thrasher"
"Thrasher" was part of the Earache Thrash Pack, downloadable content made available on 18 March 2008 for the music video console game Rock Band.

In turn, Evile's guitarists went into a room where another person sat with a microphone, ready to capture the sound. From the control room, Rasmussen would say "Right, play something". The respective guitarist would play his instrument, to which Rasmussen would respond "Right, move it left". Moving the guitar left, the respective guitarist would play again, Rasmussen replying with "Move it right. Alright, leave it there. Don't touch it". The respective guitarist would leave his instrument in that position, and the "record" button would be pressed. From there, the musician in question would play his parts. A Mesa Boogie Dual Rectifier amplifier was tested alongside a Marshall amplifier, but according to Drake, "the Mesa (sound) was nowhere near as good". Evile chose to record Enter the Grave's guitar parts using a Marshall amplifier, and spent roughly ten minutes attempting to achieve a "decent" sound. Slightly more time was spent testing the drums so that a "nice" sound could be achieved, and so that the drums could be tuned.

By 5 June, recording for Enter the Grave had been completed, and Rasmussen had begun mixing the album. Video footage shot during recording sessions was uploaded to Earache Records' official YouTube account on 4 July, providing an exclusive glimpse behind the scenes. In reviewing Enter the Grave, some journalists commented on Rasmussen's role as producer. Chris Kee of Zero Tolerance Magazine said that "getting Flemming Rasmussen to produce [Enter the Grave] is a major coup and as you'd expect he's done a sterling job, these fine songs all being blessed with a clean, crisp, uncluttered sound", whereas Ian Webster of Terrorizer felt that "booking a band into Sweet Silence Studios in Copenhagen to record their debut with legendary Metallica producer Flemming Rasmussen is one hell of a statement of intent from Earache." Eduardo Rivadavia of AllMusic also commented on Rasmussen's involvement, declaring that his production "is surely one large reason why the album is characterized by a distinctively crunchy, rhythmically airtight attack."

== Marketing and promotion ==
On 23 April 2007 Earache released a six-CD collection entitled Metal: A Headbanger's Companion which included a demo version of "Enter the Grave" on its third disc. Six days later, following a pre-production session, Evile performed a live set at Tottenham Court Road, London's Fopp store. "Enter the Grave", "Schizophrenia" and "Armoured Assault" were made available for streaming on the group's official website on 25 June. "Enter the Grave" was further included on an Earache summer sampler CD given out free with the August 2007 issue of Decibel.

Fans who pre-ordered the album from Earache's webstore received an exclusive red 7" vinyl single, along with an Evile poster. This vinyl was limited to a thousand copies and featured two unreleased demo tracks — "Darkness Shall Bring Death" and "Sacrificial". The 7" single was also available to purchase from selected independent retailers. On the day of the album's release outside of North America and Japan, Evile performed an in-store show at Manchester's Virgin Megastore.

Released in Europe and North America on 21 January 2008 and 5 February respectively, the song "Thrasher" surfaced on the compilation Thrashing Like A Maniac. "Thrasher" was also part of the Earache Thrash Pack, downloadable content made available on 18 March for the music video console game Rock Band. With producer Dan Fernbach of Static Films, Evile filmed a music video for the track on 28 August in South London.

== Lyrical themes ==
"First Blood"
Lead vocalist Matt Drake was "really [lyrically] inspired by films", with "First Blood"'s lyrics being inspired by the 1982 film of the same name.

Enter the Grave's liner notes credit Evile as a whole for having written the album's lyrics. In discussing his lyrical contributions during an October 2007 interview, lead vocalist / rhythm guitarist Matt Drake said that he was "really inspired by films"; "First Blood"'s lyrics were inspired by the 1982 film of the same name, whereas "We Who Are About to Die"'s lyrics were inspired by the 2000 epic Gladiator. Inspired by an urban legend about Countess Bathory, the lyrics for "Bathe in Blood" were written by Drake while Evile were recording at Sweet Silence Studios – after penning the track's lyrics, he thought he "had gone too far". "Burned Alive", meanwhile, was about burning witches; reading about witches and "how they were dealt with in olden times", Drake "thought it might be interesting to add a devilish slant to it". Inspired by what he read, Drake wrote about burned witches going to Hell, returning, and then killing everyone. Drake also wrote the lyrics to title track "Enter the Grave", and "Schizophrenia", the former being about a serial killer.

Written by bassist Mike Alexander, the lyrics to "Armoured Assault" describe a giant tank-like war machine. Alexander wrote "Killer From the Deep"'s lyrics as well, which Drake thinks might have been inspired by 1975 thriller Jaws. Drummer Ben Carter contributed lyrics for Enter the Grave, writing the lyrics to "Man Against Machine".

Eduardo Rivadavia of Allmusic felt that the album's lyrics were characterized by "splatter-demonic lyrics, reminiscent of Bay Area staples like Exodus and Forbidden – even early Slayer for brief, exceptionally inspired moments." Metal Maniacs' Kevin Stewart-Panko commented that Enter the Grave contained "songs about such need-to-know topics as John Rambo ("First Blood"), sharks ("Killer From the Deep") and, umm, thrash ("Thrasher")," deeming the album's lyrical content "escapist ridiculousness."

== Critical reception ==
Originally scheduled for issue in early 2007, Enter the Grave was released in Europe on 27 August 2007 by Earache Records and debuted at number 33 on the UK Rock Chart. Released in North America and Japan almost one month later on 25 September by Earache Records and Howling Bull Records respectively, the album sold 200 copies in the United States during its first week of release. Its Japanese edition included the bonus demo tracks "Darkness Shall Bring Death" and "Sacrificial", both of which were also available as an exclusive red 7" single vinyl. A limited-edition "redux" version of the album was issued on 13 October in Europe and on 28 October in North America, housed in a slipcase. This re-release included three bonus tracks, an Enter the Grave patch, a guitar pick, and a two-hour DVD including the entire full-length played live in rehearsal, live footage from Evile's February 2008 European tour with Megadeth, band interviews, and exclusive behind-the-scenes footage of the group on the road.

Writing mostly favourable reviews of the album, many journalists referenced 1980s thrash groups, particularly Exodus, Slayer and Testament. Awarding the album eight out of ten stars, Dom Lawson of Classic Rock described Enter the Grave as "a monstrous, life-affirming metal album that craftily welds misty-eyed nostalgia for the glory days of Exodus, Testament and Arise-era Sepultura to contemporary sonic values". Rock Sound writer Ronnie Kerswell observed that "title track "Enter the Grave" nods towards Slayer's classic "Angel of Death"", and summarized by calling the full-length "old school as fuck", while awarding Enter the Grave eight out of ten stars. Dave Ling of Metal Hammer gave the album eight out of ten stars as well, feeling that "with the galloping likes of "Bathe in Blood", "Thrasher" and "First Blood", Evile have fulfilled their side of the deal". Chris Kee of Zero Tolerance Magazine noted that "the influences are easy to spot – Metallica, Exodus, Testament, Forbidden, Lȧȧz Rockit, Slayer", but still called Enter the Grave "a triumph, a resounding war cry from the spearhead of the new UK thrash assault", awarding four and a half out of five stars.

Ian Webster of Terrorizer wrote that "First Blood" is ultra-Exodus and goes head to head with the Slayer attack of "Schizophrenia" and "Armoured Assault"", and hailed the album as "the best UK thrash debut since Sabbat's History of a Time to Come", awarding nine out of ten stars. Giving Enter the Grave four out of five stars, Kerrang!'s James Hoare commented that the album was "honed on a steady diet of early Slayer, Sacred Reich and Nuclear Assault", summarizing the full-length as "an absolute hair-swirling, air-punching beast". Terrorizer dubbed Enter the Grave the nineteenth best album of 2007, whereas Classic Rock rated the full-length the thirty-eighth best album of 2007.

== Track listing ==
No.	Title	Length
1.	"Enter the Grave"	4:31
2.	"Thrasher"	3:08
3.	"First Blood"	4:18
4.	"Man Against Machine"	6:22
5.	"Burned Alive"	5:52
6.	"Killer From the Deep"	4:41
7.	"We, Who are About to Die"	7:40
8.	"Schizophrenia"	4:17
9.	"Bathe in Blood"	6:22
10.	"Armoured Assault"	5:39

Redux bonus tracks
No.	Title	Length
11.	"Darkness Shall Bring Death (Demo)"	3:26
12.	"Sacrificial (Demo)"	3:49
13.	"Enter the Grave (Hell Demo)"	4:20

== Personnel ==
- Matt Drake – lead vocals, rhythm guitar, third guitar solo on "We, Who are About to Die"
- Ol Drake – lead guitar, cover concept
- Mike Alexander – bass guitar
- Ben Carter – drums
- Flemming Rasmussen – producer, engineer, mixer, masterer and additional backing vocals on "Enter the Grave"
- Anders H Mortensen – assistant engineer
- Vitaly S Alexius – cover illustration
- Tom Warner – layout
- Lucy Swift – photos

== Bibliography ==
- McIver, Joel (2004). Justice For All: The Truth About Metallica. United Kingdom: Omnibus Press. ISBN 0-7119-9600-8.
