= Sacred Mother Tongue =

British heavy metal band

- Also known as: SMT
- Origin: Northampton, England
- Genres: Heavy metal
- Years active: 2004–2013
- Labels: Transcend Music, EMI Label Services
- Members: Darrin South; Andy James; Craig Daws; Lee Newell

Sacred Mother Tongue was a four-piece British heavy metal band from Northampton initially formed in 2004. The line up consisted of Darrin South (vocals), Andy James (guitar), Josh Gurner (bass guitar) and Lee Newell (drums). In October 2013, the band decided to split up, citing an inability to reach a larger audience.

In 2020, guitarist Andy James joined Five Finger Death Punch as their lead guitarist, replacing long time member Jason Hook.

== Discography ==
=== Albums ===
- Revenge Is Personal (2006)
- The Ruin of Man (2009)
- A Light Shines (2012)
- Out of the Darkness (2013)

=== Singles ===
- The End
- Two Thousand Eight Hundred
- Seven
- Evolve/Become
- А Light Will Shine

=== Music videos ===
- "A Light Will Shine" video 2013 on YouTube
- "Evolve/Become" video 2012 on YouTube
- "Seven" lyrics video 2012 on YouTube
- "Two Thousand Eight Hundred" video on YouTube
- "The End" video on YouTube

== Members ==
- Andy James – guitars (2004-2013)
- Darrin South – vocals (2004-2013)
- Lee Newell – drums (2004–2013)
- Josh Gurner – bass guitar (2004–2013)
- Craig Daws – bass guitar (2013)
