= Infected Nations =

Studio album by Evile
- Released: 21 September 2009
- Recorded: 2009 at Parlour Studios, Kettering, England
- Genre: Thrash metal
- Length: 59:23
- Label: Earache
- Producer: Russ Russell

Evile chronology
Enter the Grave (2007)	Infected Nations (2009)	Five Serpent's Teeth (2011)

Professional ratings
Review scores
Source	Rating
About.com	3.5/5 stars
AllMusic	4/5 stars
Kerrang!	4/5 stars
Rock Sound	8/10 stars

Infected Nations is the second album by English thrash metal band Evile. It was released on 21 September 2009 in Europe and 22 September in the United States.

The album was produced by Russ Russell (Napalm Death, Dimmu Borgir) at Parlour Studios in Kettering, England. The cover art was created by Michael Whelan and is based on a concept by Matt Drake.

It is the last album to feature bassist Mike Alexander, who died while on tour two weeks after its release.

In an interview with the gaming company Harmonix, Ol Drake announced that he is making the album available in the video game Rock Band via the Rock Band Network.

== Track listing ==
No.	Title	Length
1.	"Infected Nation"	5:33
2.	"Now Demolition"	5:46
3.	"Nosophoros"	5:29
4.	"Genocide"	7:42
5.	"Plague to End All Plagues"	5:55
6.	"Devoid of Thought"	5:37
7.	"Time No More"	4:00
8.	"Metamorphosis"	7:40
9.	"Hundred Wrathful Deities" (instrumental)	11:14
Total length:		59:23

Bonus track
No.	Title	Length
10.	"My Parasite"	4:17
Total length:		63:14

== Credits ==
=== Band members ===
- Matt Drake – lead vocals, rhythm guitar, 2nd guitar solo on track 1, cover concept
- Ol Drake – lead guitar
- Mike Alexander – bass
- Ben Carter – drums

=== Additional personnel ===
- Michael Whelan – cover illustration
- Simon Moody – layout
- Sam Scott-Hunter – photo
- Russ Russell – production
