= Flayed Disciple =

British death/thrash metal band

- Origin: Taunton, Somerset, England
- Genres: Death metal, thrash metal
- Years active: 2008–present
- Labels: Grindscene Records, Bethlam Records
- Members: Thurston Howe; Jon Whitfield; Phil Tolfree; Paul Williams; Merv Hembrough
- Past members: Nathan Bartley; Tim Whyte; Rich Lewis
- Website: Official website

Flayed Disciple are a British death metal/thrash metal band from Taunton, Somerset, formed in 2008.They have released one studio album and several EPs, and have appeared at major UK and international metal festivals. Their music blends elements of Bay Area thrash with extreme death metal.

== History ==
Flayed Disciple formed in 2008 and recorded their debut EP, Drawn Viscera, at Collective Studios in Bridgwater later that year. In 2010, they recorded the Ejaculate While Killing EP in Bristol with producer Chuck Creese of Burning Skies.

In July 2010, the band won the Bournemouth leg of the Bloodstock Open Air “Metal 2 the Masses” competition, earning a slot on the New Blood Stage at Bloodstock. They returned to the festival in 2012, performing on the Sophie Lancaster Stage.

The band’s debut album, Death Hammer, was recorded at Foel Studio in Wales with producer Chris Fielding and released on 28 May 2012 through Grindscene Records. The album received attention in the UK metal press, with coverage in Metal Hammer, Terrorizer and Zero Tolerance.

Flayed Disciple subsequently toured in the UK and internationally, including an appearance at an open-air festival in Bangalore, India, alongside Gojira in 2012, and a European tour with Vader in 2013. They have also performed in Norway and across mainland Europe.

In March 2014, the band released a self-titled 12” vinyl independently through their own Bethlam Records label. This was followed by the EP A Hell in Living Flesh in 2022.

In Autumn 2025 they will release the EP Blistering Autolysis, recorded at Muddy Road Studios in Somerset and mastered at Parlour Studios. The record features the tracks “Banquet of the Damned” and “Scraps for the Pigs.”

== Musical style ==
Flayed Disciple’s music combines thrash metal and death metal. Early influences included Bay Area thrash bands such as Slayer, Metallica and Megadeth, while later material drew on death metal acts including Cannibal Corpse, Demolition Hammer, Napalm Death and Deicide.

Their lyrics often address violent and controversial subject matter, including serial killers, murder and atheism. Song writing is shared among all members of the band; the lyrics for Death Hammer were primarily written by drummer Phil Tolfree and then-vocalist Tim Whyte.

== Reception ==
Death Hammer (2012) received positive reviews in the UK extreme metal press. Metal Hammer praised the album’s “relentless aggression and technical precision,” while Terrorizer described it as “a vicious statement of intent from the UK underground.” Zero Tolerance highlighted the band’s combination of thrash pacing with death metal brutality.

The band’s live performances have also been noted. Metal Assault, reviewing their appearance in Bangalore, India, commended their “intensity and uncompromising delivery,” while UK zines and online outlets often praised their energy and commitment to the underground scene.

Later releases such as A Hell in Living Flesh (2022) and Blistering Autolysis (2025) have been covered in specialist metal media, with reviewers pointing to the band’s consistency and refusal to dilute their style despite long gaps between releases.

== Band members ==
Current

- Thurston Howe – guitar (2008–present)
- Jon Whitfield – guitar (2008–present)
- Phil Tolfree – drums (2008–present)
- Paul Williams – bass (2011–present)
- Merv Hembrough – vocals (2021–present)

Former

- Nathan Bartley – bass (2008–2009)
- Tim Whyte – vocals (2008–2019)
- Rich Lewis – drums (2013–2014)

== Discography ==
Studio albums

- Death Hammer (2012)

EPs

- Drawn Viscera (2008)
- Ejaculate While Killing (2010)
- Flayed Disciple (2014)
- A Hell in Living Flesh (2022)
- Blistering Autolysis (2025)
