= Insurrection Rising =

Studio album by Savage Messiah
- Released: 19 October 2009
- Recorded: The Ecology Room studios, Deal, England
- Genre: Thrash metal
- Length: 42:40
- Label: Candlelight Records
- Producer: Chris Tsangarides

Savage Messiah chronology
Spitting Venom (2007)	Insurrection Rising (2009)	Plague of Conscience (2012)

Insurrection Rising is Savage Messiah's first full studio album and was released on Candlelight Records on 19 October 2009. It was recorded at The Ecology Room studios in Deal, England. The band worked with Grammy Nominated producer Chris Tsangarides, famous for his production on such seminal albums as "Painkiller" by Judas Priest, "Tattooed Millionaire" by Bruce Dickinson as well as notching up production credits for bands such as Thin Lizzy, Black Sabbath, Y&T, Yngwie Malmsteen and more recently Biomechanical as well as many others. Recording for the album was finished in March and Scott Atkins (Cradle of Filth, Gama Bomb) was hired to mix the album.

== Track listing ==
No.	Title	Length
1.	"Insurrection Rising"	3:52
2.	"Corruption X"	4:13
3.	"In Absence of Liberty"	6:15
4.	"The Serpent Tongue of Divinity"	4:16
5.	"Vigil of the Navigator"	5:09
6.	"Enemy Image (Dehumanization)"	4:26
7.	"Silent Empire"	5:39
8.	"The Nihilist Machine"	3:59
9.	"He Who Laughs Last"	5:34
