= Fury UK =

British heavy metal band

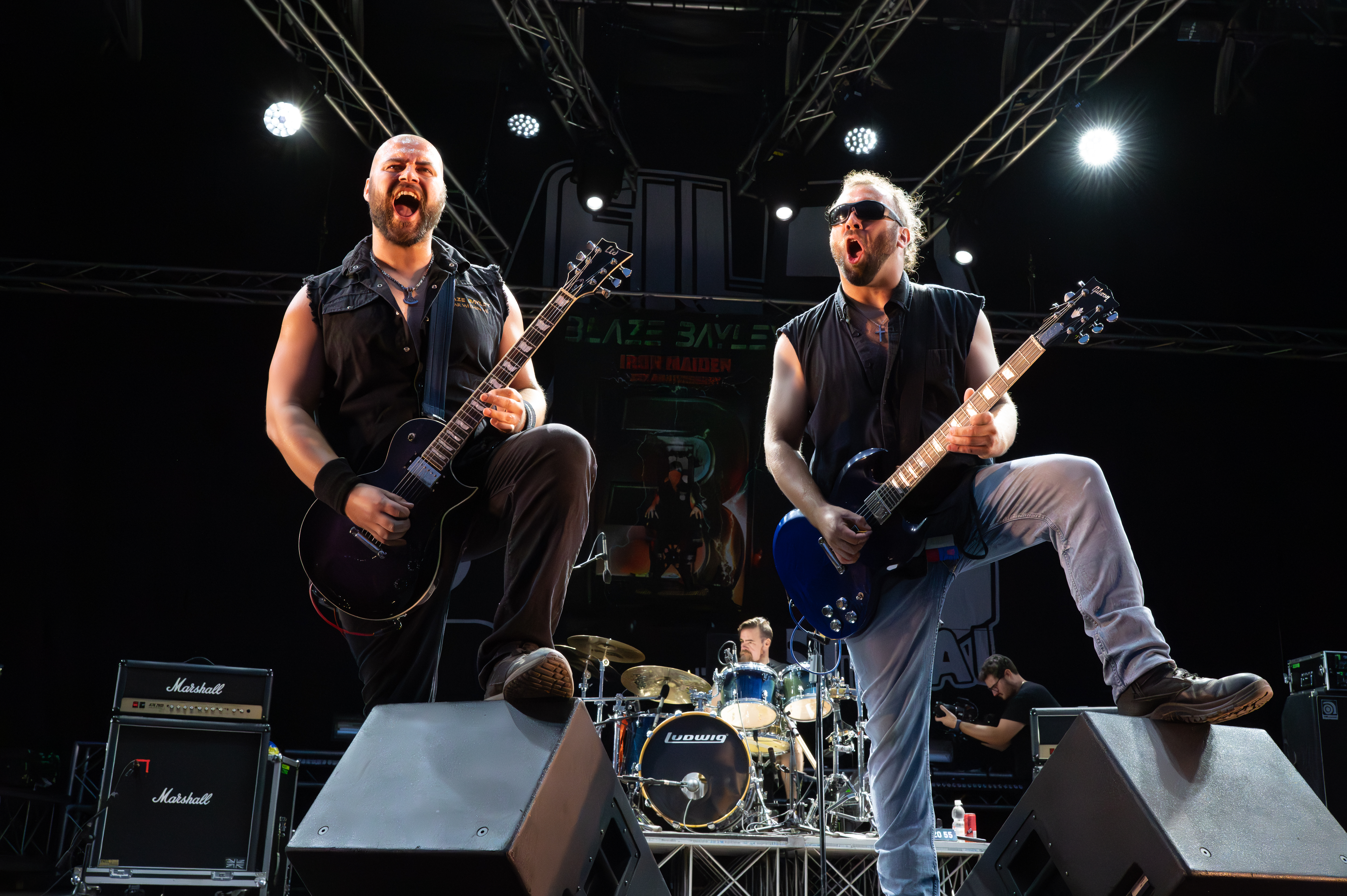
- Luke Appleton, Martin McNee and Chris Appleton performing with Blaze Bayley in 2024

Background information
- Origin: Manchester, England
- Genre: Heavy metal
- Years active: 2002–2012
- Label: Rocksector
- Spinoffs: Blaze Bayley, Absolva
- Members: Chris Appleton; Luke Appleton; Martin McNee
- Website: www.furyuk.com

Fury UK was an English heavy metal band based in Manchester, England. Between 2007 and 2012 the band played a series of important festival appearances such as Bloodstock Open Air and Hammerfest in the UK, and Prog Power Metal Festival in Belgium, toured extensively with some of the biggest names such as Saxon, Iced Earth and Michael Schenker. Meanwhile, the band released three albums, one EP and one DVD. The band received plenty of critical praise, not least from renowned music writer Dom Lawson in his review of 3rd album 'A Way of Life' for Classic Rock magazine. In May 2012 the band went on long term hiatus when bassist Luke Appleton was recruited by American heavy metal band Iced Earth, following which Fury UK members Chris Appleton and Martin McNee formed a new band called Absolva, announcing their debut album 'Flames of Justice'.

== Band chronology ==
=== Early history ===
The band was first formed around 2002 by Chris Appleton, lead guitarist and lead vocalist, whilst still in his early teens. The line-up was re-shaped several times over the early years, whilst still nothing more than a local band, playing local gigs. During this time the band released a series of demo CDs such as the EP "Hear No Evil / Alarms" and the demo album "My Tomorrow". Up until mid-2007 the band's notable gigs were a support slot with Diamond Head in Newcastle and a short tour supporting the Irish band Glyder towards the end of 2006.

=== 2007 ===
Fury UK signed to independent record label Rocksector Records in 2007. The band's first official release was the album "Face of Adversity", launched in October 2007. The line-up at that time was Chris Appleton (lead vocals/ lead guitar), Marc Dawson (bass guitar/backing vocals) and Adam Galloway (drums). Shortly after the release of the album various issues/disagreements came to a head, and as a result both Dawson and Galloway left the band. Replacements were quickly found in the form of drummer Martin McNee and bass guitarist/backing vocalist, Adam Cropper. This new line-up recorded a 3 track EP entitled "Salvation" which included the songs "Salvation", "Manslaughter" and "Lost in Forever", released in February 2008. During this period the band played their first three support gigs with the former Iron Maiden and Wolfsbane singer, Blaze Bayley.

=== 2008 to 2009 ===
By this time the band was being lauded as one of the standard-bearers of traditional British metal In March 2008 Fury UK played the Monsters Of Mosh festival at Jilly's Rockworld in Manchester, on stage before Tokyo Dragons, Blaze Bayley and Breed 77. In August 2008 the band made their first appearance at the Bulldog Bash biker festival in Stratford-upon-Avon, a show which was headlined by The Wildhearts. Immediately after that show Adam Cropper left the group and was replaced immediately on bass guitar and backing vocals by Chris Appleton's brother Luke initially on a temporary basis. Only six days after Luke joined, the band played Bloodstock 2008 Open Air Festival, headlined by Nightwish, Opeth and Dimmu Borgir. Luke was made a permanent member a month later, just as they played at the Rock Of Ages Festival in Birmingham on 7 September alongside Blitzkrieg, Steve Grimmett and more.

After the good ending to 2008 Fury UK seemed to really gain momentum and 106.1 Rock Radio held up the band as "future classics" as determined by public vote. In 2009 a second album "VR" was released in July again on Rocksector Records. The band also played support on a 20 date UK tour with Blaze Bayley, and a 7 date UK tour with Michael Schenker. The band was referred to and praised in author and former-Blaze Bayley drummer Larry Patterson's book tracing the history of the Blaze Bayley band.

Fury UK also played a second appearance at the Bulldog Bash (headlined by UFO and Motorhead) and at Hellfire Festival at Birmingham NEC, headlined by Saxon. Additionally at Hellfire Festival Luke Appleton deputised on bass guitar with Blaze Bayley. Fury UK also played tour dates in Greece (including the infamous attack by local youths in Agrinio) and Switzerland towards the close of 2009.

=== 2010 ===
The band took a break at the beginning of 2010 before playing Wizzfest in Belgium and Hammerfest, in North Wales (Iced Earth headlining). They were also tipped by Metal Hammer magazine who included Fury UK in its HotList for 2010. Early in 2010 Luke Appleton again deputised on bass with Blaze Bayley, this time at the 96.3 Rock Radio Scotland gig at The Garage, Glasgow. Recording took place in April for a third Fury UK album A Way Of Life.

In May/June 2010, Chris Appleton and Martin McNee played lead guitar/backing vocals and drums respectively in the UK Baddasses band which was formed to back former AC/DC singer Dave Evans during his UK Tour. Evans was promoting his album "Judgement Day" released in the UK in April. The UK Badasses also comprised Marshall Gill from New Model Army (lead guitar) and his brother Leon Gill (bass).

On 10 July, Fury UK played a second successive appearance at SOS Festival in Manchester which proved to be an emotionally charged night because at the end of the band's set Blaze Bayley joined them for a rendition of the Black Sabbath classic "Heaven and Hell" as sung originally by the recently deceased Ronnie James Dio whose birthday it would have been on that exact date. Both the Appleton brothers then went on to deputise on lead guitar and bass guitar respectively with Blaze Bayley in his headline set at SOS Festival. Fury UK appeared at Bloodstock Open Air Festival for a second time in August 2010.

On 6 September 2010, the band released its third album A Way Of Life, again on Rocksector Records. This album was critically praised, not least by Dom Lawson who, writing for Classic Rock, declared "A Way Of Life" as "one of the most exciting British metal albums of recent times". Fury UK played 8 dates supporting Y andT on their UK tour in October. Frontman Chris Appleton joined Y&T on-stage to perform their song "Forever" at the London O2 Islington Academy show. Y&T frontman Dave Meniketti praised Fury UK in interview also.

=== 2011 ===
The band then went on to play a 12 date UK tour with Saxon and Wolfsbane in April 2011. Those 12 dates formed part of a total tour commitment of 35 dates, including headline shows across the UK but also in France, Belgium and the Netherlands. Fury UK headlined Day One of SOS Festival 2011, whilst Day Two was headlined by Scottish rockers GUN who had scored a top ten hit many years previously with their cover of Cameo's "Word-up".

In August 2011, Fury UK were announced amongst the first five bands for Hammerfest IV festival, taking place in March 2012. The other 4 bands announced were Anthrax, Paradise Lost, Chimaira and Lawnmower Deth. Fury UK's song "Fall From Grace" from the "A Way Of Life" album is featured as the audio soundtrack to the official Hammerfest IV promo video.

The band completed 2011 with a 35 date European Tour, across 18 countries, covering approximately 12,500 miles. Many dates on this tour were as special guests with American power metal band Iced Earth. At the final show the 2 bands played together Fury UK joined Iced Earth for a tour finale jamming "War Machine" by KISS in Ludwigsburg, Germany.

=== 2012 ===
Fury UK began 2012 with a break from live shows until 16 March when they played Hammerfest IV at Prestatyn, North Wales, headlined by Anthrax. The band also announced a DVD release for 6 April, entitled "Death By Lightning" and including mainly a video tour diary from the 2011 European Tour. A 24 date European Tour was announced to begin on 6 April including several shows as special guests with Michael Schenker and an appearance at PPM Fest headlined by Accept.

On 10 April 2012, Luke Appleton was announced as the bassist for the American heavy metal band Iced Earth, for the remainder of their Dystopia World Tour, after Freddie Vidales announced that he was leaving the band. Upon completion of their UK and European Tour by May 2012, Fury UK went on hiatus until such time as all three members are available concurrently.

In May 2012, Fury UK members Chris Appleton and Martin McNee formed a new band Absolva, joined by Tom Atkinson and Dan Bate. Absolva was confirmed to play its debut show at SOS Festival in Manchester on 22 July, followed by three shows as special guests with Iced Earth in August.

They have since re-united as the backing band for former Iron Maiden and Wolfsbane singer, Blaze Bayley since 2014, alongside then new Absolva bassist Karl Schramm.

== Members ==
- Chris Appleton – lead vocals and lead guitar
- Martin McNee – drums
- Luke Appleton – bass guitar and backing vocals

== Discography ==
- Face Of Adversity album, released October 2007 on Rocksector Records.
- Salvation EP, released February 2008 on Rocksector Records.
- VR album, released July 2009 on Rocksector Records.
- A Way Of Life released September 2010 on Rocksector Records.
