= Savage Messiah (band) =

English metal band

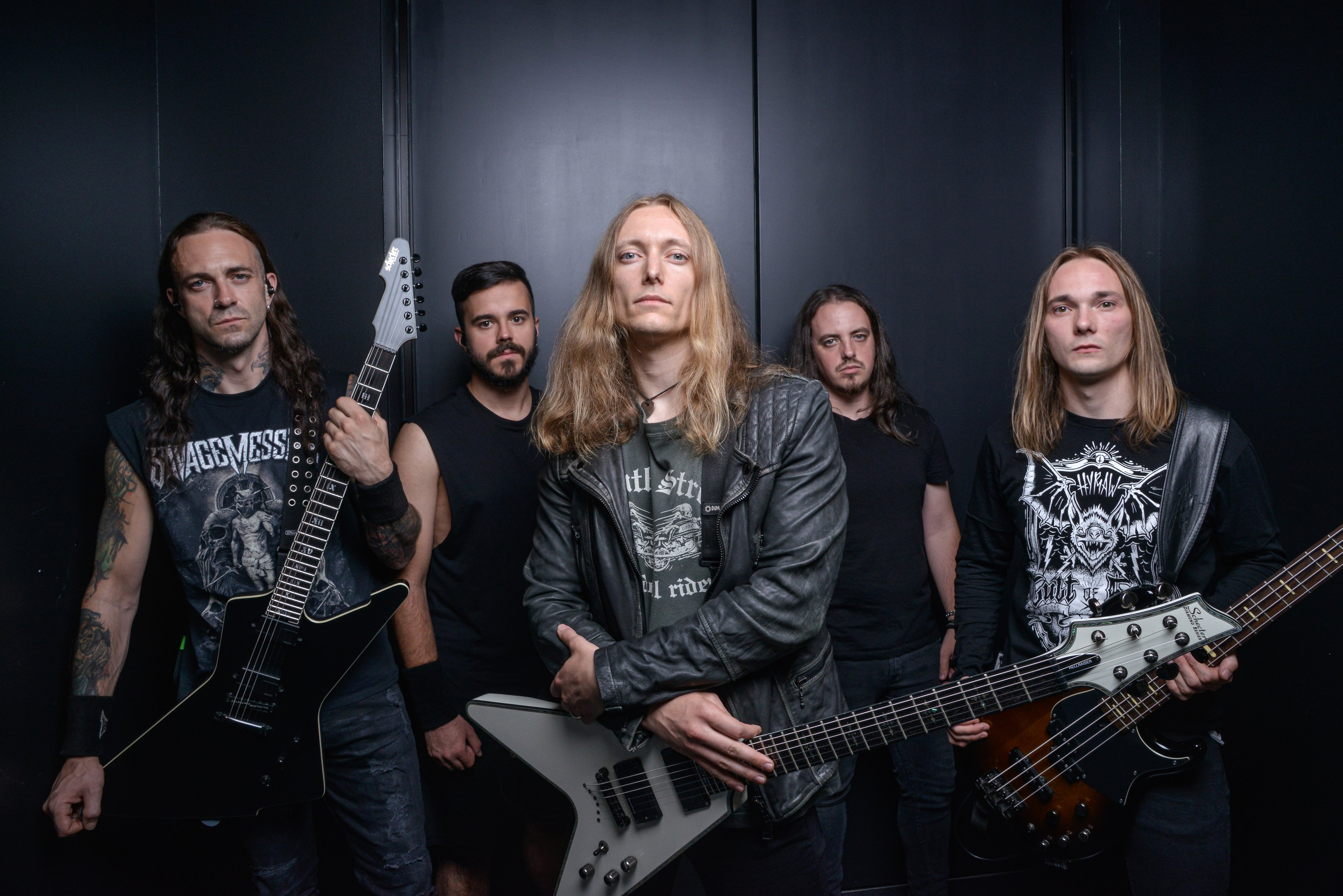
- Savage Messiah in 2019

Background information
- Origin: London, England
- Genres: Thrash metal, heavy metal
- Years active: 2007–present
- Labels: Earache, Century Media, Trooper, Candlelight
- Members: Dave Silver; Joff Bailey; Míra Sláma; Charly Carretón; Carlos Alcalde De Lema
- Website: savagemessiahofficial.com

Savage Messiah are an English thrash metal/heavy metal band formed in May 2007 in London. The band was formed by guitarist and lead vocalist Dave Silver and also consists of guitarist Joff Bailey, bassist Míra Sláma, keyboardist Carlos Alcalde De Lema and drummer Charly Carretón.

== History ==
Savage Messiah were formed in London in 2007 by Dave Silver. Their debut self-financed EP Spitting Venom was released on 1 October 2007 by SMR Productions (the band's own label) to positive reviews.

In January 2009, the band was signed to Candlelight Records, and entered the studio with Grammy-nominated producer Chris Tsangarides to record their first full-length album, Insurrection Rising. The album was mixed by Scott Atkins (Cradle of Filth, Gama Bomb, Sylosis), and would be the start of a long term working relationship between the band and Scott Atkins.

Insurrection Rising was released on 19 October 2009. The band immediately hit the road as support to Overkill for a 19 date European Tour as well as picking up additional support shows with Sylosis, Death Angel and playing festivals such as Hellfire Festival at the Birmingham NEC with Saxon, Napalm Death etc., and Hammerfest with Iced Earth, Five Finger Death Punch, Suicidal Tendencies etc.

It was announced on 13 August 2010 that Savage Messiah was to be signed by Earache Records, with whom they signed a worldwide multi-album deal.

The band entered Grindstone Studios in July 2011 to begin recording what would become Plague of Conscience, once again with producer Scott Atkins. Taking breaks from recording to pick up shows with Skeletonwitch, Devilstone Open Air Festival in Lithuania, and then embarking on a 15 date UK tour with label mates Evile, for which they released an advanced mix of the song "The Accuser" On 12 October 2011.

The band's second album, Plague of Conscience, was released on 23 January 2012.

The first live activity in support of Plague of Conscience saw the band take part in the HMV "next big thing" series of concerts with Evile at HMV Ritz in Manchester, another appearance at Hammerfest and a string of UK headline dates supported by Diamond Plate as well as an appearance at the UK's Bloodstock Open Air Festival.

In June 2012, the band contributed a cover version of the Metallica song "Of Wolf and Man" to the Kerrang! Magazine "A Tribute to the Black Album" CD which was released on 20 June 2012.

On 12 December 2012, the band premiered their video for the song "All Seeing I" on the front page of Vevo.

On 1 July 2013, Savage Messiah entered the studio to record their third studio album, The Fateful Dark, with producer Scott Atkins. Once again taking a break from the studio to support Finish metallers Wintersun on a UK tour. Lead guitarist/vocalist Dave Silver also took part in a Century Media sponsored guitar clinic at Carvin Guitars in West Hollywood, California before returning to the UK to complete recording.

Prior to the release of The Fateful Dark, the band joined Denver, Colorado thrashers Havok and Spanish metal act Angelus Apatrida for a 28 date European tour through the UK, France, Italy, Slovenia, Germany, Austria, Czech Republic, Spain and Belgium.

The Fateful Dark was released on 10 March 2014 in Europe by Earache Records, 12 March 2014 in Japan by Trooper Entertainment and 18 March 2014 in the US by Century Media Records.

On 17 February 2014, the band released a promo video for the track "Hellblazer", directed by Tom Walsh (Bullet for my Valentine, Pendulum) and featuring Game of Thrones star Pixie-Le-Knot. The video received regular play on UK metal Sky TV channel Scuzz.

Upon the release of the album Savage Messiah joined Soulfly for 8 dates across the UK, followed by another run of UK headline dates culminating in another appearance at Hammerfest.

On 10 April 2014, it was announced that the band had been nominated for a Metal Hammer Golden Gods Awards in the category of "Best New Band"

In 2014, the band was awarded a grant by the British Phonographic Industry and performed on Channel 4 News as well as being interviewed regarding the grant.

The rest of 2014 saw the band take in headlining tours of Europe and the UK.

In October 2014, the band were confirmed as support on a 27 date European tour as an opening act for Amon Amarth and Huntress commencing in January 2015.

In February 2015, Warner Bros. Records announced the Metal Matters compilation disc including songs from Deep Purple, Slipknot, MC5 and many others. The Savage Messiah track "Hellblazer" was amongst the songs included.

In 2016, the band performed on several tours in the UK and Europe, opening for Testament, Trivium, Armored Saint. They also performed at the Download Festival in the UK, Prog Power USA and opened the main stage at Loud Park Festival in Japan.

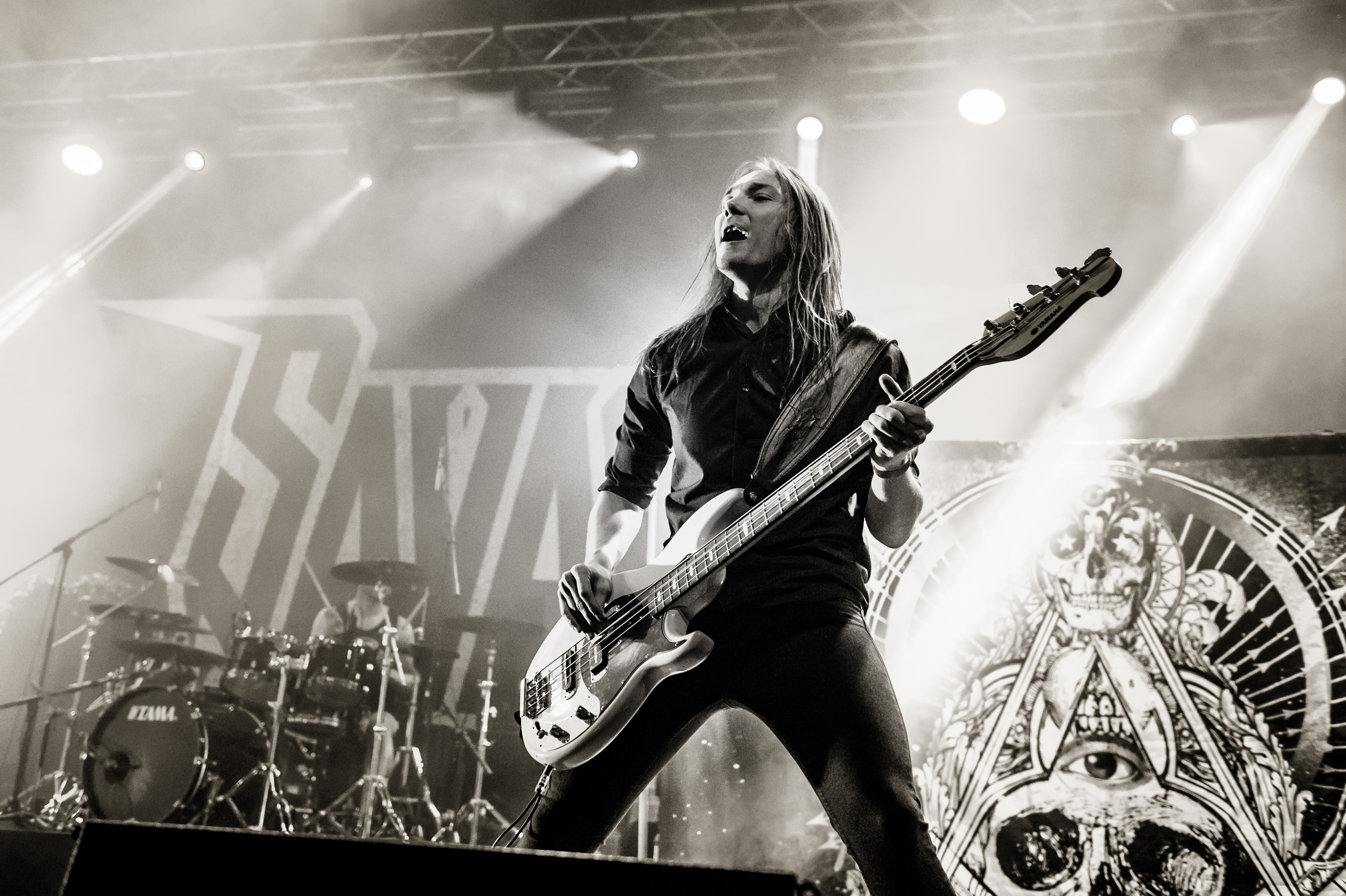
Savage Messiah at the Ruhrpott Metal Meeting 2017 in Germany

In August 2017, the band announced that they had signed a new record contract with Century Media Records for the release of their fourth full-length album titled Hands of Fate. The album was recorded at Rockfield Studios in Monmouth and produced by long time collaborator Scott Atkins. The album was mastered in Los Angeles by Dave Collins (Metallica, Linkin Park, Soundgarden) and has artwork created by Travis Smith (Avenged Sevenfold, Opeth).

In October and November 2017, they toured the UK and Ireland playing 11 venues, supporting Cradle of Filth.

The band announced Charly Carretón as a new full-time drummer in February/March 2019.

In March 2019, the band released their first single 'Under No Illusions' off their upcoming album titled "Demons" which will be released on 17 May 2019, they also announced 3 special album launch shows in the UK in that month and a European tour with Symphony X as special guests for May/June 2019. Carlos Alcalde de Lema joined the band as a live keyboardist for the tour and remained the band's new member afterwards.

In August 2019, former lead guitarist Joff Bailey reunited with the band and made his first appearance at Wacken Open Air 2019.

== Musical style ==
According to laut.de, Insurrection Rising sounds a lot like bands such as Testament and Megadeth, with the vocals in particular reminiscent of Dave Mustaine. Marc Halupczok of Metal Hammer said in his review of Insurrection Rising that the band was "the second English hopeful in terms of thrash" alongside Evile. The guitar riffs are occasionally reminiscent of Exodus, but the music sounds catchier and like a mixture of early Annihilator, Testament, Megadeth and Artillery. Dave Silver's vocals would sometimes reach "breakneck heights". In songs such as "The Serpent Tongue of Divinity", "Vigil of the Navigator" or "Silent Empire", a mixture of heavy and thrash metal can be heard. According to Halupczok, the band scaled back the thrash metal influences on Plague of Conscience and focused a little more on traditional metal. The music is most comparable to more recent Megadeth releases, although Silver's vocals are clearer.

== Members ==
- Dave Silver – lead vocals, guitars (2007–present)
- Míra Sláma – bass (2014–present)
- Joff Bailey – guitars (2011–2015, 2019–present)
- Carlos Alcalde De Lema – keyboards (2019–present)
- Charly Carretón – drums, percussion (2019–present)

=== Past members ===
- Sasha Krohn – bass
- Chris O'Toole – bass
- Stefano Selvatico – bass
- Andy Faulkner – drum programming
- Pete Hunt – drums
- Andrea Gorio – drums (2012–2017)
- Ernesto Nogara – drums
- Mauricio Chamucero – drums
- Tom Draper – guitar
- Sy Taplin – guitar
- James Tyler – guitar
- Sam Saadat – guitar

Touring members

- Ali Richardson – drums (2017–2018)
- Dan Wilding – drums (2017–2018)

== Discography ==
Studio albums

- Insurrection Rising (Candlelight 2009)
- Plague of Conscience (Earache 2012)
- The Fateful Dark (Earache 2014)
- Hands of Fate (Century Media 2017)
- Demons (Century Media 2019)

EPs

- Spitting Venom (SMR 2007)

Singles

- "Cross of Babylon" (Earache 2014)
- "Hands of Fate" (Century Media 2017)
- "Under No Illusions" (Century Media Records 17 May 2019)
