= Evile =

English thrash metal band

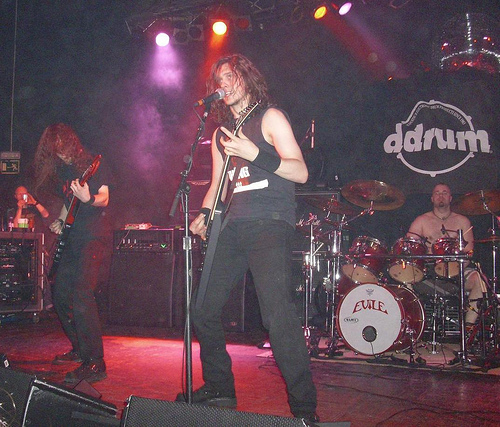
- Evile performing in 2008

Background information
- Origin: Huddersfield, West Yorkshire, England
- Genre: Thrash metal
- Years active: 2004–present
- Labels: Earache, Century Media, Napalm
- Members: Ben Carter; Joel Graham; Ol Drake; Adam Smith
- Past members: Mike Alexander; Piers Donno-Fuller; Matt Drake
- Website: evilecult.com

Evile are an English thrash metal band from Huddersfield, formed in 2004. They have experienced numerous line-up changes over the years, with drummer Ben Carter being the only member of the original line-up to have stayed consistently. The current line-up consists of Carter, bassist Joel Graham, lead guitarist and vocalist Ol Drake, and rhythm guitarist Adam Smith, who replaced Drake's older brother Matt in 2020.

Evile are notable for being part of the thrash metal resurgence movement of the mid-to-late 2000s, and they were praised by Kerrang! for "Carrying the genre's whole 'revival' on their shoulders." To date, the band has released six studio albums: Enter the Grave (2007), Infected Nations (2009), Five Serpent's Teeth (2011), Skull (2013), Hell Unleashed (2021) and The Unknown (2023).

== History ==
=== Pre-Evile (1999–2004) ===
In 1999, former school friends Ben Carter and Matt Drake came together over a mutual love for thrash metal and heavy metal and formed a cover band named Metal Militia (primarily playing Metallica classics) Matt's brother, Ol Drake, joined as the lead guitarist, and London-born bassist Mike Alexander responded to the band's advert in a local guitar store looking for a bassist influenced by bands such as Metallica, Sepultura and Testament.

At the band's first live show, at the Ukrainian Club in Halifax, an audience member was hit in the face by a brick thrown by locals.

=== Birth of Evile (2004–2006) ===
In 2004, the band ceased playing covers and dedicated their time to writing original material. Soon after, they independently recorded and released two EPs in limited quantities (250–500 units): All Hallows Eve EP (2004) and Hell Demo (2006). Evile toured extensively throughout the UK (2004–2006) and Netherlands (2006), played as the support act for Exodus and eventually signed to Earache Records. Though Earache had received the band's Hell Demo, it was after label head Digby Pearson witnessed Evile's set at Bloodstock Open Air in 2006 that he contacted the band and signed them to the label. In an interview Matt Drake said that the band was originally supposed to be called "Exile", but there were "a million other bands that called themself that" so the "X" in the band's name was changed to a "V," and the band became known as Evile.

=== Enter the Grave (2007–2009) ===
Prior to the album's recording, Matt Drake contacted producer Flemming Rasmussen (Metallica, Morbid Angel, Blind Guardian, Artillery) by doing a search for his name on Google and enquired as to whether or not he would like to hear Evile's material. Flemming responded positively, prompting Matt to send him some Evile mp3s via e-mail. Supposedly, Flemming never commented on the mp3s, causing Matt to presume that he "hated them", but when Earache Records contacted Flemming to request his skills as producer for Evile's debut, he swiftly accepted the offer.

In 2007, Evile recorded their debut album, Enter the Grave, at Sweet Silence Studios in Copenhagen with producer Flemming Rasmussen and assistant engineer Anders H Mortensen. The album reached No. 33 on the UK rock album charts, and Kerrang! magazine awarded the album 4 out of 5 stars while dubbing Evile as "Carrying the genre's whole 'revival' on their shoulders". Generally, the album was received positively and received highly rated reviews, including those from Terrorizer Magazine (9/10), Metal Revolution (100/100) and Classic Rock (the 38th best album of 2007).

The band played many shows with class-acts such as Machine Head, and other bands such as Sabbat, Sanctity, Gama Bomb, Severe Torture and Desecration. On 11 December 2007, Evile participated in and won Metal Hammer's Get in the Ring 2, at the Kentish Town Forum, London. Four bands (Evile, Engel, Viking Skull and Goat the Head) performed thirty-minute sets inside a boxing ring and the public selected their favorite via SMS texts. The show was compered by Oderus Urungus of Gwar and the judges included Ville Valo of HIM. Valo commented that Evile were "really tight and rhythmic" but they were not his "cup of tea." The competition was rebroadcast on Rockworld TV on SKY Channel 368 throughout January and February 2008 and included an hour-long supplement dedicated to Evile's GITR2 set.

In February and March 2008, Evile supported thrash metal band Megadeth on the European leg of their Tour of Duty and the UK leg of their Gigantour, opening for American deathcore band Job for a Cowboy. In 2008, they played the UK's Bloodstock festival alongside headliners Opeth and Dimmu Borgir. The band was received warmly throughout the respective tours, and on the final date, they briefly joined Megadeth on stage at the Hugennottenhalle in Frankfurt to sing the heavy metal anthem "Peace Sells". In March 2008, Evile's track "Thrasher" was featured on the Wii, Xbox 360, and PlayStation 3 video game Rock Band as downloadable content (part of the "Earache Thrash Pack"). In April 2008, the band embarked on a European tour alongside thrash veterans Exodus. During the tour, they allowed a 14-year-old fan to join them on stage to perform "Enter the Grave", and on a few occasions they joined Exodus in backing vocals on "The Toxic Waltz," which was followed by the members of Exodus handing their instruments over to Evile to close the set.

On 8 October the release of Evile's first official Music Video. The video was "Thrasher", a song from their debut album, and was directed by Dan Fernbach (who directed bands such as Bullet for My Valentine). Also on 8 October the re-release of Evile's Enter the Grave via Earache Records. Included in the package was a lengthy DVD, Evile guitar pick (with three alternate designs), A woven patch and three bonus tracks.

The band later announced they would provide support to Satyricon on their European "Tour of Nero" in November/December 2008. On 19 November 2008, while on the tour, lead guitarist Ol Drake reportedly collapsed due to health issues. His jaw was fractured and the under-side of his chin was cut open. Evile were forced to cancel their appearances on the remainder of the tour. He then had to have his jaw wired shut for two weeks for healing.

Beginning in April 2009, Evile began the UK/Ireland "We Who Are About to Tour" tour along with UK death metal act Trigger the Bloodshed, and London Thrash band Mutant. Warpath, who were originally scheduled for the tour, pulled out two days prior to the start of the tour (though the unfortunate injury occurred a week before the tour) leaving Evile two days to find a replacement band. Evile played two brand new songs which would be featured on their second album; one entitled "Demolition" and one without a title, which on a nightly basis was open to being named by the audience.

=== Infected Nations and the death of Mike Alexander (2009–2010) ===
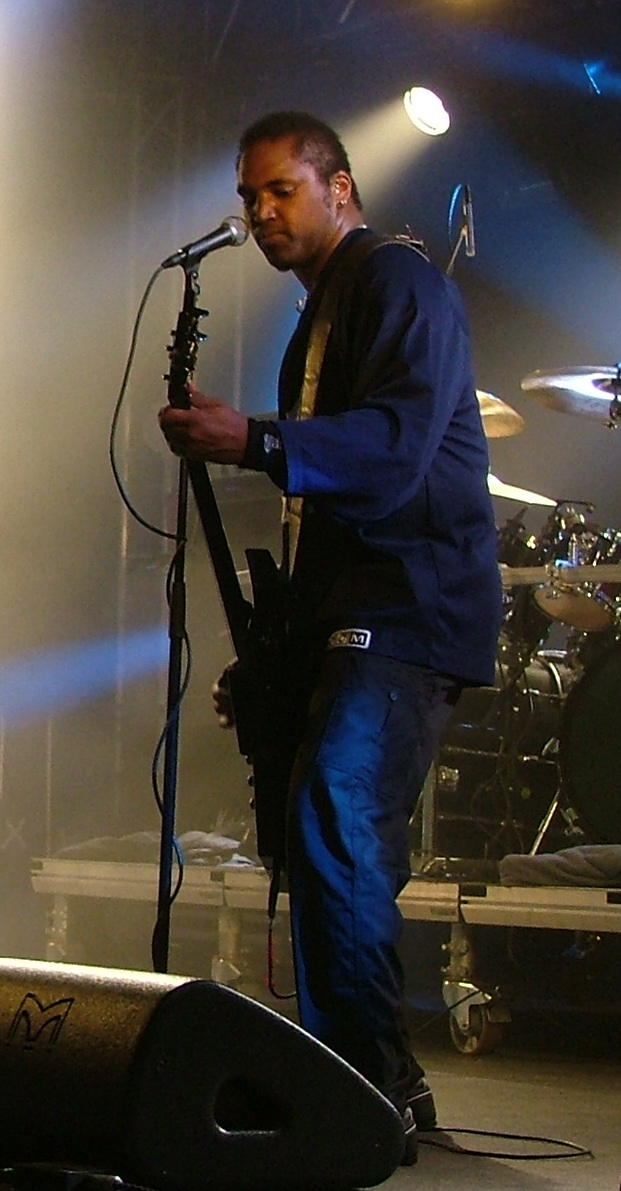
Mike Alexander (22 June 1977 – 5 October 2009)

In February 2009 Evile began the pre-production process for their second album with Russ Russell (who has worked with bands such as Napalm Death, The Exploited and Dimmu Borgir). May and June saw Evile enter Parlour Studios in Kettering with Russell to record the album. The band would post three video updates whilst in the studio, and give fans a chance to "Ask Evile" questions via their Myspace blog. On an Evile studio tour hosted by Ben the working titles of songs to be on the album could be seen written on a whiteboard.

On 22 June, Evile revealed that the title of the second album would be Infected Nations, with artwork created by Michael Whelan (who also worked with the likes of Sepultura, Obituary and Stephen King). A video was posted online on the same day of Ol talking fans through the concept of the art, stood in front of a large poster print of the cover. The album was released on 21 September in Europe and 22 September in USA. Infected Nations jumped into the UK top 100 chart at number 91 following its first-day sales.

The band released three tracks publicly prior to the album's release. These tracks were "Infected Nation", "Now Demolition" and "Nosophoros". Evile released a music video for the track "Infected Nation" which, like "Thrasher" was directed by Dan Fernbach and Static Films once again. Also, like "Thrasher", displays the band playing a dynamically aggressive song in a very confined space.

In September 2009, Schmier of the German thrash metal classics Destruction asked lead guitarist, Ol Drake, to stand in for them on guitar. This was prompted by Destruction's guitarist, Mike Sifringer, breaking his fingers forcing them to find a temporary replacement.

On 5 October 2009, tragedy struck the band as their bass player, Mike Alexander, died whilst being rushed to hospital while the band were on tour in Luleå, Sweden. He died from a pulmonary embolism, a blood clot on the lungs. Evile unveiled a tribute site to their fallen member. In early December 2009 the remaining members of Evile held two memorial nights for Mike. One was held in Leeds Rios and the other in the Camden Underworld, London. The night consisted of a covers set of some of Mike's favourite songs and bands, with members of the support bands (Gama Bomb, Mutant and Seregon) on the night stepping in on various instruments. Nick Barker (Dimmu Borgir, Cradle of Filth, Testament, Exodus) also took to the stage on both nights to play drums for several tracks. Both shows saw each remaining member of Evile take to the stage to read out messages of thanks from Mike's girlfriend, children and Mother. The Leeds show saw Mike's mother take to the stage and express her thanks to Evile's fans.

Evile were asked, by UK Magazine Metal Hammer, to cover a Pantera track for their Dimebag Darrell tribute Issue. The band chose to cover "Cemetery Gates" with it being their favourite Pantera track. The track would go on to receive positive feedback, be released via iTunes and get substantial airplay in the United States. This would unfortunately be the last track recorded with Mike Alexander. A raffle was also organized prior to the nights to raise funds for Mike's children and family. Evile and Mike's family were overwhelmed to receive support from people/bands such as Ozzy Osbourne & Sharon Osbourne, Iron Maiden, Metallica, Megadeth, Slayer, Machine Head, Exodus, Overkill, Trivium, Andy Sneap, Annihilator, Benediction, Hirax and more. The winners of the Raffle Prizes were announced via YouTube by Matt and Ol.

Evile started auditions for a new bass player in late November/December 2009. They then announced dates for a 2010 UK/Europe tour, with the bands The Fading and Warbringer. On 16 December it was reported that Joel Graham (formerly of Rise to Addiction) is the band's new bass player. In December Evile announced their first shows in USA/North America. One tour supporting Kreator alongside Voivod, Kataklysm and more. The other tour being in support to Overkill alongside Vader, God Dethroned and Warbringer.

In April 2010 Evile would pay tribute to their late bassist, Pantera and Dimebag Darrell by performing their cover of "Cemetery Gates" in the latter's birthplace of Dallas, Texas while on tour with Overkill in North America. Also in April 2010, it was announced that Evile would be returning to Bloodstock Open Air, playing main stage on Saturday 14 August. Evile will also be playing Hellfest, Wacken Open Air, Sonisphere and many more European Festivals.

Evile's track "Bathe in Blood" was used in the film Ondine by Neil Jordan and starring Colin Farrell.

From September 2010 to the end of December the band toured extensively throughout North America. The band had several headline dates as well as tours with veterans such as Overkill, D.R.I. and fellow thrash-band Gama Bomb. Also in February, Ol Drake took part in a "Game with Fame" session via Xbox Live, inviting gamers to play the videogame Rockband 3 with him. The event was advertised on the Xbox Live Dashboard and took place for 3 hours (5pm-8pm EST). Around this time the entire Infected Nations album became available via the Rock Band Network, as well as the band achieving "Artist of the Month".

=== Five Serpent's Teeth (2010–2012) ===
On 31 May, Evile revealed that they'd begun working on their third studio album. Ol Drake confirmed this via TwitLonger on 9 November and told that "Album 3 is well on the way and will be out on Earache Records in mid 2011". In February 2011 Evile embarked on a short UK tour to say goodbye to their "Infected Nations" album, while also showcasing a brand new track with the working title "Bitch". Matt also announced the third album will have the initials "FST". In March 2011 it was announced that Evile had entered Parlour Studios to begin recording their 3rd album with producer Russ Russell. Periodically, the band have been posting excerpts of the album's recording process on their official YouTube page. On 25 April, the band announced that their 3rd album was fully mixed and awaiting mastering.

In May 2011 Evile announced that they would pay tribute to their fallen bandmate, Mike Alexander, on the latest album. The track was entitled "In Memoriam". Ol Drake commented:

It goes without saying that there would be some element of the new album which was for Mike alone. We had a few ideas floating around which were out of the ordinary for Evile, and when Mike passed away those ideas just started to make more and more sense. "In Memoriam"'s initial intention was for Mike and Mike alone. All of us in the band have different views and thoughts on what the song means and who it is for, but it was born out of a want to include something special for Mike, his family and ourselves. As the song grew it started to take on a life of its own, so to speak. It is for anyone who's lost anyone close to them. There is a lot of meaning behind this song, and I expect a few people will question Evile doing such a song, but if the sentiment isn't understood, I couldn't care less. As our producer, Russ Russell said: "It's a brilliant song for a brilliant guy."

It has been revealed through hard rock/heavy metal magazine Metal Hammer that the title for their third album would be Five Serpent's Teeth to be released 26 September 2011 in Europe and 18 October 2011 in North America through Earache Records. On 6 June, the band posted a new song, titled "Eternal Empire", on their YouTube channel. On 12 September 2011 the album's first single/music video, "Cult", was released. The video saw a different, more modern approach. In September/October 2011 the band set out on a 15-date headline tour of the UK with label-mates Savage Messiah as support. The band were then asked by Kerrang! Magazine to cover a Nirvana song for Nevermind's 20th Anniversary Tribute Issue. Evile covered the track "Lounge Act". Ol Drake commented:

When we got the offer, all I could see was fun to be had, and what an honor it was to be included. I was a big fan of Nirvana when I was a young teen, so it's an extra honor in that way for me. I wondered what we could do to the track to make it our own, so we approached it like we would one of our own songs. That bass riff is brilliant and I wanted to make it more a core element of the track guitar-wise and just metal it up in general. I wanted to respect the approach of the song but also alter Kurt's [Cobain] chord approach to a style more suited to EVILE, and that's a chug-athon!

In October Evile celebrated the release of Five Serpent's Teeth by taking part in in-store signing sessions in select Blue Banana stores as well as a short tour of Release Shows in the UK; London, Birmingham and Holmfirth. On 17 October The band were featured in a Live Session on BBC Radio 1's Rock Show with Daniel P. Carter. The set was recorded at Maida Vale Studios, London. In November Evile announced a 24-date Headlining tour of Europe with Portrait and Dr. Living Dead as supports.

On 11 February 2012 Evile took part in, and headlined, HMV's "Next Big Thing" at the HMV Ritz in Manchester, UK along with Cerebral Bore and Savage Messiah. After the death of Woods of Ypres mastermind David Gold, the band decided to make the first live debut of "In Memoriam" a dedication to him. "In Memoriam" was initially written as a tribute to their fallen bandmate, Mike Alexander. In March 2012, Evile's lead guitarist Ol Drake was nominated for the "Dimebag Darrell Shredder" Award as part of Metal Hammer Golden Gods Awards. Also up for the award were Devin Townsend, Dino Cazares (of Fear Factory, Russ Parrish), Satchel (of Steel Panther) and Adam Dutkiewicz (of Killswitch Engage). In April 2012 Evile announced they would start filming a music video for the track "In Memoriam". Ol Drake commented:

The initial idea was to release the "Cult" video, as we did, then immediately get onto recording the video for "In Memoriam"; this was easier said than done. It's been well documented why the song exists. When it came to getting the "right"/"appropriate" treatment for the video, it was a lengthy process. The song is so close to all of us that we wanted to make sure the video complemented the song and its subject matter, and that all four of us were happy with how the song will be portrayed visually. If we'd have settled on the first idea after "Cult", we wouldn't have been happy, so amidst touring and gigging, we've been working hard on getting this 100% before we move on to the next video. The song is basically about loss, which we can all relate to, so we wanted to express that in the video, while staying respectful to why the song exists. We can't wait to get this filmed and out there for all to enjoy!

=== Skull and the departure of Ol Drake (2013–2015) ===
On 31 January 2013, Ol Drake announced via his Tumblr that Evile were to begin recording their fourth album the following weekend. He also confirmed that the band would again utilise producer Russ Russell. On 25 March, Ben Carter and Earache Records released the album name, cover and release date of their fourth album, entitled Skull. Guitarist Ol Drake announced his departure from Evile in August 2013. In August 2014, Evile announced that Piers Donno-Fuller (formerly of Fallen Fate) would be joining them as lead guitarist, and that they "have something in the pipeline for March".

=== Switching members, Hell Unleashed and The Unknown (2016–present) ===
As early as March 2016, Evile began working on their fifth studio album. On 19 March 2018, Evile announced the departure of Piers due to personal commitments. On 24 April of the same year, the band announced Ol Drake had rejoined the band. On 12 August 2020, Evile announced that Matt Drake had quit the band "a while ago", leaving drummer Ben Carter as their only permanent member. On rhythm guitar, Drake was replaced by Adam Smith of RipTide, while his brother Ol took over on guitar and vocals. In the following month, Evile were signed to Napalm Records and began recording their new album with Chris Clancy for a 2021 release. Then On 3 February 2021, Evile announced that their fifth studio album, Hell Unleashed, would be released on 30 April, and the video for the album's lead single, which is the title track, directed by James Mansell, was released on the same day. The song "Gore" includes a guest backing-vocal appearance from actor/comedian Brian Posehn. The song, and music video directed by James Mansell, was released on 18 March. Evile promoted Hell Unleashed with a UK tour in February 2022, supported by Divine Chaos and Tortured Demon.

In response to why the album had taken eight years to materialise, frontman Ol Drake commented:

they hadn't really done any new music, and when I rejoined in 2018, I just hit the ground running and started new material and the whole complication with my brother leaving and everything made it last even longer. It should have been out a year and a half ago really but sh*t happens.

Hell Unleashed is also the first Evile studio album to include a cover by another band. Ol Drake commented on including Mortician's "Zombie Apocalypse":

The main reason we did it, is because of how fun that riff is. I have loved it most of my metal life. I always play it when we are sound checking or I pick up the guitar and that riff is always in my vocabulary and it was literally just an excuse for us to play it. It is just so fun and I can't wait to do it live.

In a June 2021 interview with Metal Hammer, Ol Drake revealed the band had planned to work on their sixth studio album. He said, with a chuckle, "I started writing the next album before [Hell Unleashed] was even finished. New material will probably start in late 2021." Three months later, he confirmed in a "small announcement" on Facebook that Evile had not only officially begun writing their sixth studio album, but stated that it would not take another eight years for it to be released. On 18 May 2023, the band announced that their upcoming sixth studio album, The Unknown, would be released on 14 July.

== Band members ==
Current members

- Ben Carter – drums (2004–present)
- OL Drake – lead guitar, backing vocals (2004–2013, 2018–present), lead vocals (2020–present)
- Joel Graham – bass, backing vocals (2009–present)
- Adam Smith – rhythm guitar, backing vocals (2020–present)

Former members

- Matt Drake – lead vocals, rhythm guitar (2004–2020)
- Mike Alexander – bass, backing vocals (2004–2009; died 2009)
- Piers Donno-Fuller – lead guitar, backing vocals (2014–2018)

Timeline

== Discography ==
=== Albums ===
Year	Album details	Peak chart positions			Certifications
Year	Album details	UK	UK Rock	US Heat	Certifications
2007	Enter the Grave: Released: 27 August 2007; Label: Earache	—	—	—	Over 30,000 copies sold worldwide
2009	Infected Nations: Released: 21 September 2009; Label: Earache	—	—	132	—
2011	Five Serpent's Teeth: Released: 26 September 2011; Label: Earache	111	—	35	—
2013	Skull: Released: 27 May 2013; Label: Earache, Century Media	—	—	34	—
2021	Hell Unleashed: Released: 30 April 2021; Label: Napalm	49 (Physical)	5	—	—
2023	The Unknown: Released: 14 July 2023; Label: Napalm	—	11	—	—
"—" denotes releases that did not chart

=== Demo albums ===
Year	Title
2004	All Hallows Eve
2006	Hell Demo

=== Singles ===
Year	Single	Album
2010	"Cemetery Gates" (Pantera cover)	Non-album single
2011	"Eternal Empire"	Five Serpent's Teeth
2011	"Cult"	Five Serpent's Teeth
2012	"In Memoriam"	Five Serpent's Teeth
2012	"In Dreams of Terror"	Five Serpent's Teeth
2013	"Underworld"	Skull
2021	"Hell Unleashed"	Hell Unleashed
2021	"Gore"	Hell Unleashed
2021	"The Thing (1982)"	Hell Unleashed
2023	"The Unknown"	The Unknown
2023	"Reap What You Sow"	The Unknown
2023	"When Mortal Coils Shed"	The Unknown

=== Music videos ===
Year	Song	Director	Album
2007	"Thrasher"	Dan Fernbach	Enter the Grave
2009	"Infected Nation"	Dan Fernbach	Infected Nations
2011	"Cult"	Ramy Elgamal	Five Serpent's Teeth
2012	"In Memoriam"	Ben Thornley	Five Serpent's Teeth
2012	"In Dreams of Terror"	Ash Pears	Five Serpent's Teeth
2013	"Underworld"	Unknown	Skull
2021	"Hell Unleashed"	James Mansell	Hell Unleashed
2021	"Gore"	James Mansell	Hell Unleashed
2021	"The Thing (1982)"	Ingo Spörl	Hell Unleashed
2023	"The Unknown"	Unknown	The Unknown
