= Transcend Music =

British record label

Transcend Music Ltd.
- Founded: 2007
- Founder: Rob Ferguson
- Status: Active
- Distributor: Universal Music
- Location: Milton Keynes, England
- Official website: transcendmusic.com

Transcend Music is a British record label and artist management company. Founded in 2007 by Rob Ferguson, they have signed acts such as Malefice and The Dirty Youth.

== History ==
Transcend Music was founded as Transcend Records in Milton Keynes in 2007. Initially, the label's main focus was rock and metal, though a wider variety in genre of earlier releases included acid folk and art rock. Founder Rob Ferguson has stated, "starting the label was something I was driven to do out of frustration. I was already working with bands in a management capacity and I felt that I could offer a better solution for those artists to get their music out and advance their careers."

Ferguson had previously worked with artists as diverse as George Harrison, Pete Townshend, John Entwistle, Duran Duran, Iron Maiden, Spice Girls, and Robbie Williams. He was also personal manager to both Matt Goss and Luke Goss from teen band Bros, and continues to represent Matt Goss in his solo career, currently headlining at Caesars Palace Las Vegas.

In October 2016, it was announced that British pop supergroup Bros would be re-forming for a one-off show at London's o2 Arena. The show subsequently sold out in seven seconds, becoming the fastest ever sellout at the venue promoted by Live Nation. A number of other arena shows have now been announced, Rob Ferguson also heads up the Bros management team.

The label's first full-length release was The Unholy Feast by The More I See, produced by Andy Sneap.

By 2008, the label had expanded to also handle management and merchandise. They also changed their name to Transcend Music. In 2009, they signed an exclusive distribution deal with Plastic Head Music in Europe, the biggest independent distributor in the UK. In March 2010, they announced they had absorbed the management and booking operation Legacy Agency, which had been formed in late 2008 by Carl Sewell. Legacy had by then worked with bands such as Carcer City and While She Sleeps. Transcend Music announced "a major restructuring program" in June 2012, which involved new signings and streamlining measures, as well as absorbing RMR Management.

In 2015, Transcend Music evolved in to total music and entertainment consultancy business. The client base now includes, artists, promoters, production companies, and event management organisations.

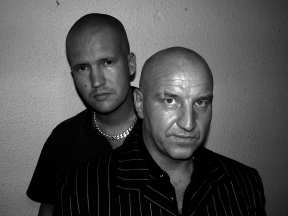
Rob Ferguson With Dave Courtney in 2003

Ferguson is featured in a number of real crime books, including two by UK gangster Reggie Kray and more recently in books by modern celebrity gangster Dave Courtney. Ferguson took a number of celebrities to meet Reggie Kray in prison, including the Fun Lovin Criminals. In April 2000, Ferguson was pictured in the funeral cortege of Charlie Kray, in the car with 'Mad' Frankie Fraser and Bartley Gorman King of the Gypsies. Ferguson has also been reported in private meetings with Lord Jeffrey Archer.

== Artists ==
Transcend Music has a roster of artists it releases music for or manages and consults for, these include The Dirty Youth, Viking Skull Matt Goss, Crash Mansion, and Stormbringer. Rob Ferguson has stated that he signed Sacred Mother Tongue after first spotting them playing metal covers and a few original songs in a pub.

=== Current roster ===
- Bros
- Matt Goss
- Scott McWatt
- Lewis Macleod
- A Sight For Sewn Eyes
- Arcite
- Bossk
- Canvas
- Carcer City
- Cavorts
- Continents
- Crash Mansion
- Giants
- Heart of a Coward
- Heights
- Hellish Outcast
- I Divide
- In Archives
- The Injester
- Liferuiner
- Malefice
- Pavilions
- Sleep When You're Dead
- Stormbringer
- Subsource
- The Charm The Fury
- The Dirty Youth
- Viking Skull
- Yashin

=== Gallery ===
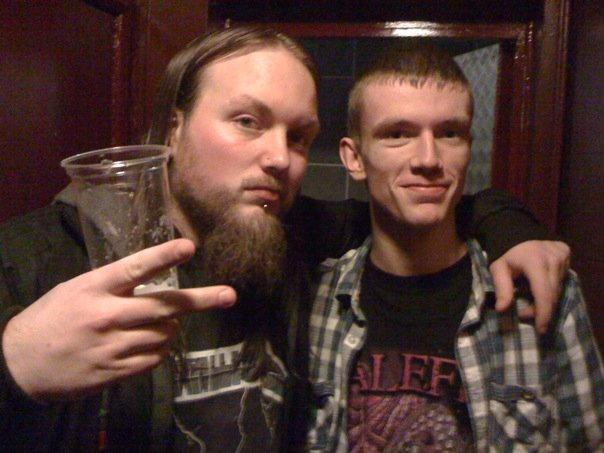
Malefice lead vocalist Dale Butler (left) with a fan

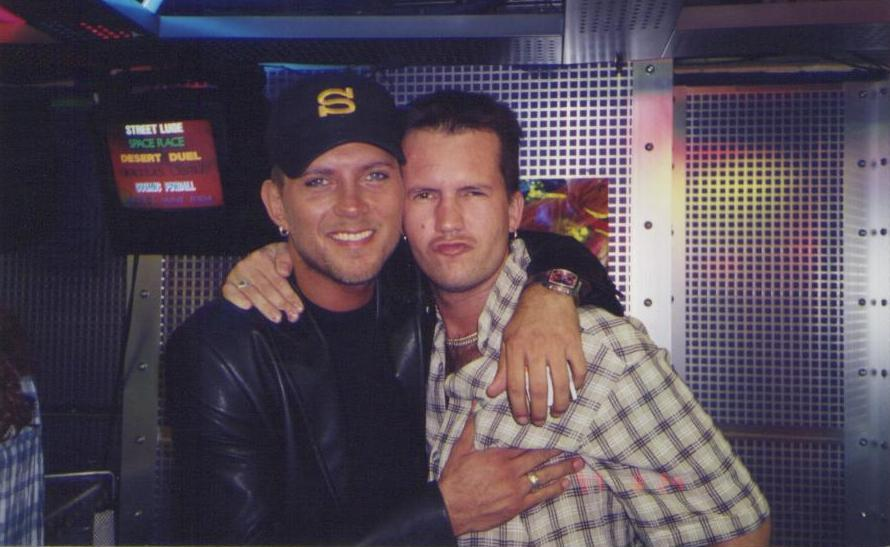
Ferguson (left) on video shoot with Matt Goss 1995

Rob Ferguson With Fun Lovin Criminals and Mrs Kray 1998

== Discography ==
Artist	Title	Year
The More I See	The Unholy Feast	2007
Sacred Mother Tongue	"Anger on Reflection"	2009
Scar my Eyes	This Machine...	2009
Untamed	Insanity Bound	2008
Tides of Virtue	Malevolence	2010
Carcer City	The Life We Have Chosen	2011
Imicus	Animal Factory	2011
Sacred Mother Tongue	The Ruin of Man	2011
The Dying Reflex	Behold The Eve of Ruin	2011
Andy James	Andy James	2011
Imperial Vengeance	Black Heart of Empire	2011
Imperial Vengeance	The Twentyshilling and Fourpence V-disc	2011
Six Hour Sundown	Jekyll & Hyde	2011
Hellish Outcast	Your God Will Bleed	2012
Monument	Fatal Attack	2012
Viking Skull	Cursed by the Sword	2012
Imicus	The Marionette	2012
Sacred Mother Tongue	A Light Shines EP	2012
Malefice	Entities – Anniversary Edition	2012
Carcer City	The Road Journals	2012
Giants	There Are The Days	2012
Sondura	You Remain	2012
The Dirty Youth	Last Confession	2012
Dead Harts	Born into Rags To Die No Richer	2013
Collapse	Arms and the Covenant	2013
A Sight For Sewn Eyes	Alone Together	2013
Sleep When You're Dead	Last Lungs	2013
The Dirty Youth	Requiem of the Drunk	2013
Sacred Mother Tongue	"A Light Will Shine"	2013
Sacred Mother Tongue	Out of the Darkness	2013
Malefice	"V"	2013
Heights	"The Noble Lie"	2013
Malefice	Five	2013
Heights	Old Lies For Young Lives	2013
Liferuiner	Future Revisionists	2013

Source: The Genepool Discography

== See also ==
- List of independent UK record labels
