= Russ Russell =

British record producer

Russ Russell is a British record producer, sound engineer, mixer, mastering engineer, musician and writer. He has worked all over the world and now is mostly based at Parlour Studios in the UK. He was also the guitarist in the psychedelic band Draw, and now plays in British metal band Absolute Power and cosmic mind metal trio, Reformat.

Although working in many different styles of music, Russell is now mostly known for his work in rock and metal working with bands such as Napalm Death, Dimmu Borgir, At the Gates, the Wildhearts, the Exploited, Evile, the Haunted, Lock Up, Defecation, Meathook Seed, the Berzerker, Gorerotted, Space Ritual, Primitive Graven Image, Nuclear, Absolute Power, Leng Tch'e, Nekkrosis, THE*GA*GA*S, Sikth, Amorphis, New Model Army, Raging Speedhorn, Shrapnel, Luna Riot, Eradikator, Heretic, Evil Scarecrow, and many more.
