= Damnation Festival =

Heavy metal festival in England

- Genre: Heavy metal, extreme metal
- Dates: October/November
- Locations: Jilly's Rockworld, Manchester, England (2005–2006) Leeds Student Union, Leeds, England (2007–2021) Bowlers Exhibition Centre, Manchester, England (2022–present)
- Years active: 2005–present
- Capacity: 6,000 (since 2022)
- Website: damnationfestival.co.uk

Damnation Festival is a yearly heavy metal music festival held each November at the Bowlers Exhibition Centre (BEC) in Manchester, England. It is described as the biggest indoor extreme metal festival in Europe, with more than 40 bands playing on three stages and a capacity of about 6,000 attendees.

Damnation was first held at Jilly's Rockworld in Manchester from 2005 to 2006 and then at the University of Leeds from 2007 until 2021, before moving to the larger BEC arena and becoming a two-day event. It is organized by Gavin McInally and Paul Farrington.

== Damnation 2005 ==
The first Damnation Festival was held on 16 October 2005 at Jilly's Rockworld, Manchester, England. Fifteen bands performed on two stages, headlined by Raging Speedhorn and Entombed.

Main Stage	Terrorizer Stage
Raging Speedhorn; Sikth; Charger; Fourway Kill; The Inbreds; Forever Never; Allerjen; Amends to the Dead	Entombed; Gorerotted; Gutworm; Conquest of Steel; Mercury Rain; Nailed; Dawn of Chaos

== Damnation 2006 ==
The second annual Damnation Festival was held on 15 October 2006 at Jilly's Rockworld, Manchester, England. Fourteen bands performed on two stages, headlined by The Haunted and Akercocke.

Jägermeister Stage	Terrorizer Stage
The Haunted; Skindred; Biomechanical; Murder One; Head-On; Kingsize Blues; Evile	Akercocke; Stampin' Ground; Ephel Duath; Send More Paramedics; Mistress; Madman Is Absolute; Speed Theory

== Damnation 2007 ==
The third annual Damnation Festival was held on 20 October 2007 at Leeds Metropolitan University, Leeds, England. There were eighteen bands performing on two stages, headlined by Kreator and Anaal Nathrakh.

Jägermeister Stage	Terrorizer Stage
Kreator; Amen; Orange Goblin; Raging Speedhorn; Panic Cell; The Inbreds; Romeo Must Die; Malefice	Anaal Nathrakh; Kataklysm; Aborted; 1349; Narcosis; Ted Maul; Man Must Die; Lazarus Blackstar; Soulfracture; Dead Beyond Buried

== Damnation 2008 ==
The fourth annual Damnation Festival was held on 22 November 2008 and saw the festival move to another new venue at University of Leeds, Leeds, England. The change of venues allowed the festival to expand to three stages incorporating seventeen bands headlined by Carcass, Cathedral and Pitchshifter.

British band Raging Speedhorn were initially booked to play their last show at the festival, but cancelled in favour of a last tour in Japan. Carcass would make this show their only UK show on their comeback tour.

Jägermeister Stage	Terrorizer Stage	Rock Sound Stage
Carcass; My Dying Bride; Sigh; Onslaught; Taint	Pitchshifter; Napalm Death; Benediction; The Berzerker; Desecration; Red Mist	Cathedral; Devil Sold His Soul; Ramesses *shels Latitudes; Mountains Became Machines

== Damnation 2009 ==
The fifth annual Damnation Festival was held on 24 October 2009 at University of Leeds, Leeds, England. The organizers announced the festival would again cover three stages but open doors earlier to prevent clashes between bands. The headline acts for 2009 were Life of Agony, Lock Up and Jesu.

Jägermeister Stage	Terrorizer Stage	Rock Sound Stage
Life of Agony; Therapy? Destruction; Anathema; Electric Wizard; The Gates of Slumber; Firebird	Lock Up; Rotting Christ; Akercocke; Mistress; Negura Bunget; Mithras; Charger; Nazxul	Jesu; This Will Destroy You; A Storm of Light; Minsk; Manatees; And So I Watch You from Afar; Stand-Up Guy; Rinoa

Life of Agony's headline slot was their only UK appearance in 2009.

This appearance was Mistress's last show and Rotting Christ's only English show for 2009.

Negura Bunget and Extreme Noise Terror were originally booked to play the Terrorizer stage but both pulled out. Negura Bunget played a make up set in May 2010 at sister festival Deathfest.

On 3 June Entombed were announced on the festival line up. On 23 June the bands management issued a statement announcing that the band would not appear at the festival.

== Damnation 2010 ==
The sixth annual Damnation Festival was held on 6 November 2010 at University of Leeds, Leeds, England. The Dillinger Escape Plan and Paradise Lost co-headlined the Jägermeister Stage, whilst Discharge headlined the Terrorizer stage and Alcest the Rock Sound Stage.

Jägermeister Stage	Terrorizer Stage	Rock Sound Stage
The Dillinger Escape Plan; Paradise Lost earthtone9 Sabbat; Lawnmower Deth; Rolo Tomassi; Panic Cell; Mutant	Discharge; Anaal Nathrakh; Hecate Enthroned; Fukpig; Short Sharp Shock; The Antichrist Imperium; Bonesaw; Colonel Blast; Diascorium	Alcest; The Ocean; Esoteric; October File; Maybeshewill; Fen; The Mire; The Construct

== Damnation 2011 ==
The seventh annual Damnation Festival was held on 5 November 2011 at University of Leeds, Leeds, England. The festival covered three stages, headlined by Devin Townsend Project, Ulver and God is an Astronaut.

Decapitated were forced to pull out after surviving a plane crash. Returning from their US tour, the plane was forced to make a landing with no landing gear in their native Poland.

Jägermeister Stage	Terrorizer Stage	Zero Tolerance Stage
Devin Townsend Project; Godflesh; Grand Magus; Evile; Turisas; Illuminatus; Xerath	Ulver; Decapitated (withdrew from festival); Doom; Chthonic; Dragged into Sunlight; Shining; A Man Called Catten; Cerebral Bore	God Is an Astronaut; Amplifier; Altar of Plagues; Talons; Astrohenge; Conan; A Forest of Stars; Humanfly

== Damnation 2012 ==
The eighth annual Damnation Festival was held across three stages at the University of Leeds student union, Leeds, England, on Saturday 3 November.

Jägermeister Stage	Terrorizer Stage	Eyesore Merch Stage
Electric Wizard; My Dying Bride; Primordial; Gama Bomb; Textures; Devil Sold His Soul; Hawk Eyes	Pig Destroyer; Belphegor; Aura Noir; Vreid; Extreme Noise Terror; Winterfylleth; Hang the Bastard; The Atrocity Exhibit	Amenra; Maybeshewill; 40 Watt Sun; Bossk; BlackListers; Wodensthrone; Ravens Creed

== Damnation 2013 ==
The ninth annual Damnation Festival was held across four stages at the University of Leeds student union, Leeds, England, on Saturday 2 November. The event was headlined by Carcass in their only UK headlining show of 2013 following the release of their new album.

Jägermeister Stage	Terrorizer Stage	Eyesore Merch Stage	Electric Amphetamine Stage
Carcass; Katatonia; God Seed; SSS; Shining (NOR); Twilight of the Gods	Rotting Christ; Vallenfyre; Negură Bunget; Dyscarnate; Voices; The Afternoon Gentlemen; Diamanthian	Cult of Luna; Crippled Black Phoenix; The Ocean; Rosetta; Year of No Light; Tides from Nebula; Dirge	Conan; Moss; Serpent Venom; Palehorse; Slabdragger; Black Magician; Iron Witch

== Damnation 2014 ==
The 10th Damnation Festival was held at Leeds University Union on Saturday 1 November and featured a total of 26 bands across four stages. The sold out event saw a crowd of approximately 4000 in attendance.

Headliners for the event were UK death-metal act Bolt Thrower who played their only UK performance for 2014 at the festival. October File were booked to play the festival but were forced to withdraw prior to the event, they were replaced by Dyscarnate.

Jägermeister Stage	Terrorizer Stage	Eyesore Merch Stage	PHD Stage
Bolt Thrower; Saint Vitus; Orange Goblin; Raging Speedhorn; Stampin' Ground; Dyscarnate	Cannibal Corpse; Anaal Nathrakh; Revocation; Winterfylleth; Aeon; Xerath; Amputated	Fen; Wodensthrone; A Forest of Stars; CODE; Falloch; Obsidian Kingdom; Bast	Ahab; Monarch! Sólstafir; Hark; Black Moth; Atlantis; Corrupt Moral Altar

== Damnation 2015 ==
The 11th Damnation Festival was held at Leeds University Union on Saturday 7 November and featured a total of 27 bands across four stages. The event was headlined by At the Gates.

Jägermeister Stage	Terrorizer Stage	Eyesore Merch Stage	Electric Amphetamine Stage
At the Gates; High on Fire; Sólstafir; The Ocean; Oathbreaker; Savage Messiah	Primordial; Asphyx; Keep of Kalessin; Vreid; Voices; Wiegedood; The King Is Blind	Mono; Amenra; Altar of Plagues; Maybeshewill; Crown; Talons; Tacoma Narrows Bridge Disaster	40 Watt Sun; The Wounded Kings; Witchsowrrow; Ghold; Sea Bastard; Ohhms; Undersmile

== Damnation 2016 ==
The 12th Damnation Festival was held at Leeds University Union on Saturday 5 November.

Jägermeister Stage	Terrorizer Stage	Eyesore Merch Stage	Stagey McStageFace: 4th Stage
Electric Wizard; Abbath; Cult of Luna & Julie Christmas; Oceans of Slumber; Hang the Bastard; Hark	Enslaved; Akercocke; Ne Obliviscaris; Venom Prison; Mithras; Svalbard; Attan	Ufomammut; Black Tusk; Bossk; Sinistro; Erlen Meyer; Conjurer; Dialects	Ingested; Dread Sovereign; The Infernal Sea; Employed to Serve; Darkher; Gets Worse; Kroh

== Damnation 2017 ==
The 13th Damnation Festival was held at Leeds University Union on Saturday 4 November.

Jägermeister Stage	Terrorizer Stage	Eyesore Merch Stage	Tone MGMT Stage
Bloodbath; Sodom; Paradise Lost; Warning; Myrkur; Pallbearer	Agoraphobic Nosebleed; Dying Fetus; Nails; Dragged into Sunlight; Vallenfyre; Wiegedood; Disentomb	Nordic Giants; Leprous; Agent Fresco; Big Business; Psychedelic Witchcraft; PG Lost; Body Hound	Grave Pleasures; Psycroptic; The Great Discord; Mutation; Beyond Creation; Leng Tch'e; Wren

== Damnation 2018 ==
The 14th Damnation Festival was held at Leeds University Union on Saturday 3 November.

Jägermeister Stage	Tone MGMT Stage	Cult Never Dies Stage	Eyesore Merch Stage
Napalm Death; Ihsahn; Entombed A.D. Anaal Nathrakh; Ne Obliviscaris; Cancer	Vader; Batushka; Celeste; Saor; Lik; Fukpig; Leeched	Ghost Bath; Mourning Beloveth; A Forest of Stars; Bong; Insanity Alert; Møl; Hundred Year Old Man	The Ocean; Monuments; Årabrot; Rosetta; Ohhms; Caligula's Horse; Vola

== Damnation 2019 ==
The 15th Damnation Festival was held at Leeds University Union on Saturday 2 November.

Jägermeister Stage	Tone MGMT Stage	Cult Never Dies Stage	Eyesore Merch Stage
Opeth; Mayhem; Alcest; Primordial; Mgła; Raging Speedhorn	Venom Prison; Gaahls Wyrd; Birds in Row; Inter Arma; Blood Red Throne; Carnation; Godeater	Imperial Triumphant; Crowhurst; Mork; Voices; Earth Ship; Dawn Ray'd; The Infernal Sea	Big Business; The Vintage Caravan; A Pale Horse Named Death; Jo Quail; Lord Dying; Wheel; Alunah

== Damnation 2020 ==
Damnation festival was cancelled in 2020 due to ongoing regulations around music venues during the COVID-19 pandemic.

== Damnation 2021 ==
The 16th Damnation Festival was held on 6 November 2021. Green Lung were originally booked to play the Eyesore Merch Stage but had to pull out due to a member of the band testing positive for COVID-19. They were replaced by Svalbard. It was also the last time it would take place at Leeds University.

Jägermeister Stage	Tone MGMT Stage	Cult Never Dies Stage	Eyesore Merch Stage
Carcass; Paradise Lost; Godflesh; Onslaught; Bossk; Evile	Memoriam; Conan; Conjurer; Gama Bomb; Man Must Die; Party Cannon; Cryptic Shift	Esoteric; Hellripper; Winterfylleth; Wode; Video Nasties; Urne; Abduction	Year Of No Light; Regarde Les Hommes Tomber, Sylvaine; Svalbard; Dvne; Boss Keloid; Mountain Caller

There were three exclusive full-album performances:

- Svalbard - When I Die, Will I Get Better?
- Akercocke - The Goat of Mendes
- Raging Speedhorn - Raging Speedhorn

== Damnation 2022 ==
The 17th Damnation Festival was held on 5 November 2022, for the first time at the Bowlers Exhibition Centre in Manchester. Ministry were originally booked to headline the festival but pulled out due to the cancellation of their European tour. Godflesh were announced as the replacement. There were four exclusive full album performances:

- Converge - Jane Doe
- At The Gates - Slaughter of the Soul
- Godflesh - Streetcleaner
- Pig Destroyer - Prowler in the Yard

Pins & Knuckles Stage	Holy Goat Brewing Stage	Eyesore Merch Stage
Converge; At the Gates; Godflesh; My Dying Bride; Pig Destroyer; Full of Hell; Insanity Alert; Irist	Decapitated; Despised Icon; Misery Index; Wolves In The Throne Room; Incantation; Bell Witch & Aeriel Ruin: Stygian Bow; Oceano; Distant	Elder; Pallbearer; 40 Watt Sun; Green Lung; We Lost the Sea; So Hideous; BRUIT ≤ Frayle

== Damnation 2023 ==
The 18th Damnation Festival was held over two days, 3–4 November 2023, at the Bowlers Exhibition Centre in Manchester. A smaller event called "A Night of Salvation" was held on 3 November. It included bands billed for the main festival performing exclusive sets.

A Night of Salvation

Pins & Knuckles Stage	Church Road Records Stage	Eyesore Merch Stage
Katatonia; Leprous; Enslaved; Bossk; Viking Skull	Deadguy; Heriot; Din of Celestial Birds; Inhuman Nature; Celestial Sanctuary	Akercocke; Sigh; The Infernal Sea; Ninkharsag; The Suns Journey Through the Night

The following exclusive album sets were performed for A Night of Salvation:

- Katatonia - Dead End Kings
- Leprous - Coal
- Enslaved - Below the Lights
- Akercocke - Choronzon
- Sigh - Scorn Defeat
- Bossk - Audio Noir
- Viking Skull - Chapter One
- Deadguy - Fixation on a Co-Worker

Damnation

Pins & Knuckles Stage	Holy Goat Brewing Stage	Eyesore Merch Stage
Electric Wizard; Enslaved; Katatonia; Amenra; Julie Christmas; Unearth; Khemmis; Nordic Giants	Anaal Nathrakh Rotten Sound; Deadguy; Undeath; Strigoi; High Command; Crepitation; Coffin Mulch	Maybeshewill; Bossk; Sigh; Downfall of Gaia; OHHMS; Ashenspire; Kurokuma; Laster

== Damnation 2024 ==
The 19th Damnation Festival was held on 1–2 November 2024 at the BEC Arena, Manchester.

A Night of Salvation

Lou’s Brews Stage	Cult Never Dies stage	Pelagic Records Stage
Decapitated; The Ocean; Employed To Serve; Discharge; Insanity Alert	Cult of Fire; Mizmor; Morne; Fen; Underdark	LLNN; A Swarm Of The Sun; Hippotraktor; Sugar Horse; Norna

Damnation

Pins & Knuckles Stage	Holy Goat Brewing Stage	Eyesore Merch Stage
Cradle of Filth; Russian Circles; Bleeding Through; Nails; Ne Obliviscaris; Gatecreeper; Celeste; A.A. Williams	Dragged into Sunlight; The Ruins of Beverast; Memoriam; Fuming Mouth; 200 Stab Wounds; Hexis; Gillian Carter; Enforced	Ahab; Inter Arma; Dool; Hangman's Chair; Black Tusk; Rezn; High Parasite; Pijn

== Damnation 2025 ==
The 20th Damnation Festival was held on 8–9 November 2025. The main festival was expanded to two full days. As a result, the 'Night of Salvation' event was moved to a smaller venue, The Bread Shed, in central Manchester.

A Night of Salvation

The lineup for the 2025 Night of Salvation was kept secret until the show. The 400-capacity event sold out in twenty minutes with no bands announced.

- Raging Speedhorn
- Conjurer - performing Mire in full
- Stampin' Ground - performing Expression of Repressed Violence/Carved from Empty Wounds
- Deadguy - performing Near-Death Travel Service

Saturday

Pins & Knuckles Stage	Holy Goat Brewing Stage	Eyesore Merch Stage
Corrosion of Conformity; Pertubator; Deafheaven; High on Fire; Orbit Culture; Messa; Castle Rat; Overhead The Albatross	Gaerea; Wormrot; Panzerfaust; Brodequin; Portrayal of Guilt; Deadguy; Necrot; Devastator	The World Is a Beautiful Place & I Am No Longer Afraid to Die, Ef; Gost; Afsky; Dimscura; Meryl Streek; Zeruel; Oryx

Sunday

Lou's Brews Stage	Cult Never Dies Stage	Meloria Stage
Napalm Death; Amenra; The Haunted; Anaal Nathrakh; Pig Destroyer; Primordial; Onslaught; Conjurer	Wiegedood; Spectral Wound; Author & Punisher; Hellripper; Raging Speedhorn; Stampin' Ground; Code; Ted Maul	Warning; Mantar; Nordic Giants; Devil Sold His Soul; Psychonaut; Coilguns; Din of Celestial Birds; Hidden Mothers

In an interview with The Razor's Edge, festival director Gavin McInally confirmed the festival would continue as a full two day event.

== See also ==
- Bloodstock Open Air
- Slam Dunk Festival
