= Mechanize Tour =

2009–10 concert tour by Fear Factory

- Tour by Fear Factory
- Location: North America; South America; Europe; Oceania
- Associated album: Mechanize
- Start date: December 4, 2009
- End date: December 20, 2010
- No. of shows: 117; 14 canceled

Fear Factory concert chronology
- Transgression Tour (2005–06); Mechanize Tour (2009–10); Industrial Discipline Tour (2011)

Mechanize Tour, also named Fear Campaign Tour or Industrial Discipline Tour, was a concert tour which was headlined by American industrial metal band Fear Factory, in support of their 7th studio album, Mechanize.

It was held from December 4, 2009, to December 20, 2010. It was supposed to begin in August 2009, but the dates planned in United Kingdom, Germany, Australia & New Zealand were cancelled. The reason for the cancellation was as a result of the need for more time to complete the then-new album. An earlier show in Spain was also cancelled due to legal complications.

The band was supported by Sylosis, After All, Dååth and High on Fire, among others.

== Set list ==
Typical Setlist – South America 2009
- "Shock"
- "Edgecrusher"
- "Smasher/Devourer"
- "Martyr"
- "Scapegoat"
- "Crash Test"
- "Linchpin
- "Powershifter"
- "Resurrection"
- "Demanufacture"
- "Self Bias Resistor"
- "Zero Signal"
- "Flashpoint"
- "H-K (Hunter-Killer)"
- "Pisschrist"
- "Replica
Typical Setlist – Fear Campaign Tour

Setlist taken at the Melkweg, Amsterdam, Netherlands, February 22, 2010

- "Mechanize"
- "Shock"
- "Edgecrusher"
- "Smasher/Devourer"
- "Industrial Discipline"
- "Acres of Skin"
- "Linchpin"
- "Powershifter"
- "Fear Campaign"
- "Martyr"
- "Christploitation"
- "Resurrection"
- "Final Exit"

Encore:

- "Demanufacture"
- "Self Bias Resistor"
- "Zero Signal"
- "H-K (Hunter-Killer)"
- "Replica"
Typical Setlist – Industrial Discipline European Tour

Setlist taken at the Muziekcentrum TRIX, Antwerp, Belgium, December 7, 2010

- "Mechanize"
- "Fear Campaign"
- "Shock"
- "Smasher/Devourer"
- "Securitron (Police State 2000)"
- "Linchpin"
- "Acres of Skin"
- "Powershifter"
- "Industrial Discipline"
- "Big God/Raped Souls"
- "Martyr"
- "Demanufacture"
- "Self Bias Resistor"
- "Zero Signal"
- "Dog Day Sunrise"
- "Replica"

== Tour dates ==
| Date | City | Country | Venue |
~~Summer European Tour~~ CANCELLED
| ~~August 2, 2009~~ | ~~Amsterdam~~ | ~~Netherlands~~ | ~~Melkweg~~ |
| ~~August 3, 2009~~ | ~~Cologne~~ | ~~Germany~~ | ~~Essigfabrik~~ |
| ~~August 4, 2009~~ | ~~Hamburg~~ | ~~Germany~~ | ~~Gruenspan~~ |
| ~~August 5, 2009~~ | ~~Berlin~~ | ~~Germany~~ | ~~Columbia Club~~ |
| ~~August 9, 2009~~ | ~~Budapest~~ | ~~Hungary~~ | ~~Durer Kert~~ |
| ~~August 11, 2009~~ | ~~Aschaffenburg~~ | ~~Germany~~ | ~~Colos Saal~~ |
| ~~August 12, 2009~~ | ~~Herford~~ | ~~Germany~~ | ~~Club X~~ |
| ~~August 14, 2009~~ | ~~Derby~~ | ~~United Kingdom~~ | ~~Bloodstock Open Air~~ |
~~Summer Australia/New Zealand Tour~~ CANCELLED
| ~~August 18, 2009~~ | ~~Perth~~ | ~~Australia~~ | ~~Club Capitol~~ |
| ~~August 20, 2009~~ | ~~Brisbane~~ | ~~Australia~~ | ~~The Tivoli~~ |
| ~~August 22, 2009~~ | ~~Sydney~~ | ~~Australia~~ | ~~Enmore Theatre~~ |
| ~~August 23, 2009~~ | ~~Melbourne~~ | ~~Australia~~ | ~~Palace Theatre~~ |
| ~~August 24, 2009~~ | ~~Adelaide~~ | ~~Australia~~ | ~~HQ~~ |
| ~~August 26, 2009~~ | ~~Auckland~~ | ~~New Zealand~~ | ~~Transmission Room~~ |
South America
| December 4, 2009 | São Bernardo do Campo | Brazil | Espaço Lux |
| December 6, 2009 | Santiago | Chile | Teatro Teleton |
| December 8, 2009 | Buenos Aires | Argentina | El Teatro Flores |
| ~~December 9, 2009~~ | ~~Bogotá~~ | ~~Colombia~~ | ~~Teatro Metropol~~ CANCELLED |
| December 13, 2009 | Mexico City | Mexico | Hard Rock Live |
Fear Campaign Tour – Australia
| January 15, 2010 | Auckland | New Zealand | Big Day Out |
| January 18, 2010 | Sydney | Australia | Manning Bar (University of Sydney) |
| January 22, 2010 | Sydney | Australia | Big Day Out |
| January 26, 2010 | Melbourne | Australia | Big Day Out |
| January 27, 2010 | Melbourne | Australia | Prince Bandroom |
| January 29, 2010 | Adelaide | Australia | Big Day Out |
| January 31, 2010 | Perth | Australia | Big Day Out |
Fear Campaign Tour – Europe
Supported by Sylosis and October File
| February 16, 2010 | Manchester | England | Manchester Academy |
| February 17, 2010 | Wolverhampton | England | Wulfrun Hall |
| February 18, 2010 | Glasgow | Scotland | The Garage |
| February 19, 2010 | London | England | Electric Ballroom |
Supported by After All
| February 21, 2010 | Brussels | Belgium | VK |
| February 22, 2010 | Amsterdam | Netherlands | Melkweg |
| February 23, 2010 | Herford | Germany | X |
| February 24, 2010 | Berlin | Germany | Columbia Club |
Supported by MAN
| February 27, 2010 | Malmö | Sweden | Kulturbolaget |
| February 28, 2010 | Gothenburg | Sweden | Brew House |
| March 1, 2010 | Stockholm | Sweden | Debaser Medis |
| March 3, 2010 | Helsinki | Finland | Nosturi |
| March 5, 2010 | Copenhagen | Denmark | Pumpehuset |
Supported by After All
| March 6, 2010 | Hamburg | Germany | Markthalle Hamburg |
Supported by Neaera
| March 7, 2010 | Cologne | Germany | Essigfabrik |
| March 8, 2010 | Frankfurt | Germany | Batschkapp |
| March 9, 2010 | Munich | Germany | Backstage |
| March 11, 2010 | Milan | Italy | Magazzini Generali |
| March 12, 2010 | Athens | Greece | Gagarin 205 |
Supported by Road to Nowhere
| March 13, 2010 | Solothurn | Switzerland | Kulturfabrik Kofmehl |
Fear Campaign Tour – 1st North American Leg Supported by Winds of Plague, Periphery and Dirge Within
| March 22, 2010 | Tempe | United States | Marquee Theatre |
| March 27, 2010 | San Antonio | United States | White Rabbit |
| March 28, 2010 | Houston | United States | Meridian |
| March 30, 2010 | Fort Lauderdale | United States | Culture Room |
| March 31, 2010 | Lake Buena Vista | United States | House of Blues |
| April 1, 2010 | Atlanta | United States | Heaven @ The Masquerade |
| April 2, 2010 | Knoxville | United States | Valarium |
| April 8, 2010 | Los Angeles | United States | Nokia Club (Revolver Golden Gods 2010) |
| April 9, 2010 | San Francisco | United States | The Grand Ballroom at The Regency Center |
| April 10, 2010 | Las Vegas | United States | House of Blues |
2nd European leg Supporting Metallica with Gojira
| April 13, 2010 | Oslo | Norway | Telenor Arena |
| April 14, 2010 | Oslo | Norway | Telenor Arena |
| April 17, 2010 | Riga | Latvia | Arena Riga |
| April 18, 2010 | Tallinn | Estonia | Saku Suurhall Arena |
| April 20, 2010 | Vilnius | Lithuania | Siemens Arena |
| April 21, 2010 | Vilnius | Lithuania | Siemens Arena |
| April 24, 2010 | Moscow | Russia | Olympic Stadium |
| April 25, 2010 | Moscow | Russia | Olympic Stadium |
Fear Campaign Tour – 2nd North American Leg
Supported by Prong, Silent Civilian, Thy Will Be Done
| May 15, 2010 | Pomona | United States | California Metalfest |
| May 16, 2010 | San Diego | United States | House of Blues |
| May 24, 2010 | Sauget | United States | Pop's |
| May 26, 2010 | Flint | United States | The Machine Shop |
| May 29, 2010 | Milwaukee | United States | The Rave |
| May 30, 2010 | Columbus | United States | Alrosa Villa |
| June 4, 2010 | Worcester | United States | The Palladium |
| June 6, 2010 | Philadelphia | United States | Trocadero Theatre |
| Supported by All That Remains, Silent Civilian and Thy Will Be Done | | United States | |
| June 9, 2010 | Portland | United States | Port City Music Hall |
| June 10, 2010 | Sayreville | United States | Starland Ballroom |
| June 12, 2010 | Buffalo | United States | Town Ballroom |
| June 14, 2010 | Cleveland | Peabody's Downunder | |
Fear Campaign Tour – 1st European Summer Leg
| June 18, 2010 | Clisson | France | Hellfest |
| June 19, 2010 | Milovice | Czech Republic | Sonisphere Festival |
| June 22, 2010 | Lausanne | Switzerland | Les Docks |
| June 23, 2010 | Winterthur | Switzerland | Salzhaus |
| June 24, 2010 | Vienna | Austria | Szene |
| June 25, 2010 | Collegno | Italy | Colonia Sorona |
| June 26, 2010 | Dessel | Belgium | Graspop Metal Meeting |
| June 28, 2010 | Saint Petersburg | Russia | GlavClub |
| June 29, 2010 | Moscow | Russia | B1 Maximum Club (Originally planned at A2 in the same town) |
| July 2, 2010 | Löbnitz | Germany | With Full Force |
| July 3, 2010 | Nijmegen | Netherlands | FortaRock |
| July 4, 2010 | Essen | Germany | Devil Side Festival |
Fear Campaign Tour – 3rd North American Leg Supported by 36 Crazyfists, Divine Heresy, After the Burial< and Baptized in Blood
| July 7, 2010 | West Hollywood | United States | House of Blues |
| July 9, 2010 | Portland | United States | Roseland Grill |
| July 11, 2010 | Vancouver | Canada | Commodore Ballroom |
| July 13, 2010 | Calgary | Canada | Flames Central |
| July 14, 2010 | Edmonton | Canada | The Starlite Room |
| July 16, 2010 | Winnipeg | Canada | Garrick Centre |
| July 17, 2010 | Maplewood | United States | The Rock Nightclub |
| July 20, 2010 | Chicago | United States | Metro |
| July 21, 2010 | Detroit | United States | Harpo's |
| July 23, 2010 | Toronto | Canada | The Opera House |
| July 24, 2010 | Montreal | Canada | Heavy MTL |
| July 25, 2010 | New York City | United States | Irving Plaza |
| July 26, 2010 | Towson | United States | Recher Theatre |
Fear Campaign Tour – 2nd European Summer Leg
| July 31, 2010 | Stevenage | England | Sonisphere UK |
| August 2, 2010 | Dublin | Ireland | The Academy |
| August 3, 2010 | Belfast | Northern Ireland | Spring & Airbrake |
| August 4, 2010 | Sheffield | England | Corporation |
| August 7, 2010 | Wacken | Germany | Wacken Open Air |
| ~~August 8, 2010~~ | ~~Burgas~~ | ~~Bulgaria~~ | ~~Summer Theatre~~ CANCELLED |
| August 9, 2010 | Warsaw | Poland | Progresja |
| August 10, 2010 | Kraków | Poland | Loch Ness |
| ~~August 11, 2010~~ | ~~Jaroměř~~ | ~~Czech Republic~~ | ~~Bastion No.35~~ CANCELLED |
| August 12, 2010 | Jaroměř | Czech Republic | Brutal Assault |
| August 14, 2010 | Walton-on-Trent | England | Bloodstock Open Air |
| August 15, 2010 | Budapest | Hungary | Sziget Festival |
Oceania/Japan leg Supporting Metallica with The Sword
| September 15, 2010 | Melbourne | Australia | Rod Laver Arena |
| September 16, 2010 | Melbourne | Australia | Rod Laver Arena |
| September 18, 2010 | Sydney | Australia | Acer Arena |
| September 21, 2010 | Christchurch | New Zealand | CBS Canterbury Arena |
| September 22, 2010 | Christchurch | New Zealand | CBS Canterbury Arena |
| September 25, 2010 | Tokyo | Japan | Saitama Super Arena |
| September 26, 2010 | Tokyo | Japan | Saitama Super Arena |
Industrial Discipline European Tour
Supported by High on Fire
| December 4, 2010 | Hamburg | Germany | Gruenspan |
| December 5, 2010 | Tilburg | Netherlands | 013 |
| December 6, 2010 | Luxembourg | Luxembourg | Den Atelier |
Supported by High on Fire and Daath
| December 7, 2010 | Antwerp | Belgium | Muziekcentrum TRIX |
| December 8, 2010 | Saarbrücken | Germany | Garage |
| December 9, 2010 | Vienna | Austria | Arena |
| December 11, 2010 | Dietikon | Switzerland | SoundDock 14 (Originally planned at Dynamo in Zürich) |
| December 12, 2010 | Bologna | Italy | Estragon |
| ~~December 13, 2010~~ | ~~Cologne~~ | ~~Germany~~ | ~~Essigfabrik~~ CANCELLED |
| December 14, 2010 | Paris | France | La Maroquinerie |
| December 15, 2010 | Nottingham | England | Rock City |
| December 16, 2010 | Glasgow | Scotland | Queen Margaret Union |
| December 18, 2010 | Manchester | England | Manchester Academy |
| December 19, 2010 | London | England | HMV Forum |
| December 20, 2010 | Bristol | England | O2 Academy |

== Support acts ==
Note: Main support acts are in bold.

- Daysend (January 18, 2010)
- Blood Duster (January 27, 2010)
- **Sylosis** (February 16–19, 2010)
- **October File** (February 16–19, 2010; cancelled for the Glasgow date)
- **After All** (February 21–24, 2010; March 6, 2010)
- **MAN** (February 27 – March 5, 2010)
- Neaera (March 7–9, 2010)
- Road to Nowhere (March 13, 2010)
- **Winds of Plague** (March 22 – April 10, 2010)
- **Periphery** (March 22 – April 10, 2010)
- **Dirge Within** (March 22 – April 10, 2010; cancelled for some dates)
- Gojira (April 13–25, 2010)
- **Prong** (May 16 – June 6, 2010)
- All That Remains (June 9–14, 2010; replaced Prong)
- **Silent Civilian** (May 16 – June 14, 2010)
- **Thy Will Be Done** (May 16 – June 14, 2010)
- Dark Rise (June 22, 2010)
- DevilDriver (June 24, 2010)
- Misanthrope Count Mercyful (June 28, 2010)
- **36 Crazyfists** (July 7–26, 2010)
- **Divine Heresy** (July 7–26, 2010)
- **After the Burial** (July 7–26, 2010)
- **Baptized in Blood** (July 7–26, 2010)
- Coldwar (August 2, 2010)
- Beholder (August 4, 2010)
- Toxic Bonkers (August 9–10, 2010)
- The Sword (September 15–26, 2010)
- Tainted (September 21–22, 2010)
- **High on Fire** (December 4–20, 2010)
- **Dååth** (December 7–20, 2010)
