= Dvne =

Scottish heavy metal band

DVNE
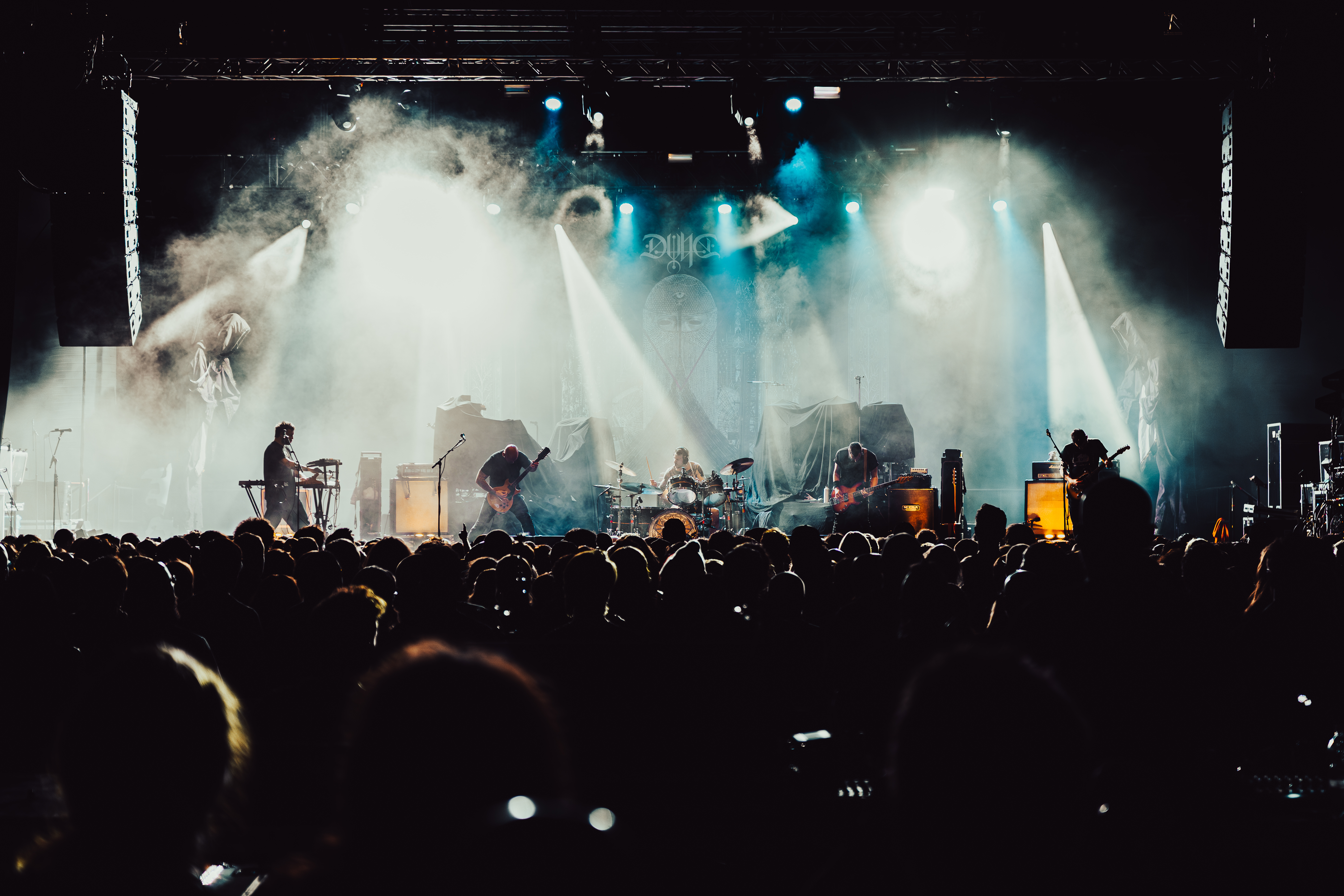
- Dvne performing in 2026

Background information
- Origin: Edinburgh, Scotland
- Genres: Post-metal|Progressive Metal
- Years active: 2013–present
- Label: Metal Blade Records
- Members: Victor Vicart; Dudley Tait; Daniel Barter; Alexandros Keros; Maxime Keller
- Website: songsofarrakis.com

Dvne (stylised as DVNE, pronounced “Dune”) is a Scottish heavy metal band from Edinburgh, currently signed to Metal Blade Records.

While their music is often categorised within the post-metal and progressive metal scenes, Dvne has been described as "a band with great contrasts" due to their ability to combine dark and heavy musical elements with intricate and delicate melodies.

== History ==
=== Formation, early years and first EPs (2013–2016) ===
Dvne was formed in 2013 by Victor Vicart (guitar, vocals, keys) and Dudley Tait (drums), with Daniel Barter (guitar, vocals) completing the line-up. Sharing a mutual love for science fiction, the members originally chose the name Dune in reference to Frank Herbert's novel of the same name. The band later adopted the stylised spelling Dvne (or DVNE) to avoid confusion with the novel and its film adaptations.

That same year, DVNE began performing at local venues in Scotland and England and released their first EP, Progenitor, a 30-minute concept album, which was made available on streaming platforms and vinyl through Wasted State Records. This EP was soon followed by another, Aurora Majesty, which showcased a darker and heavier side of the band, with DVNE citing early Mastodon, Neurosis, and All Pigs Must Die as significant influences on this release.

Between 2013 and 2016, DVNE toured the UK and Europe, supporting bands such as Crowbar, Inter Arma, Der Weg einer Freiheit, and Eyehategod.

=== Asheran (2017–2020) ===
In July 2017, DVNE gained international recognition with the release of their first full-length album, Asheran. This concept album, inspired by Hayao Miyazaki's anime Nausicaä of the Valley of the Wind and Princess Mononoke, focused on environmental themes. The album was highly praised for its songwriting and the richness of its influences and ideas.

During the Asheran album cycle, DVNE performed at several high-profile festivals in 2018, including Psycho Las Vegas, Desertfest London, and Inferno Festival in Norway. The band also embarked on several headlining tours in Europe and supported Eyehategod during their UK tour.

In 2019, DVNE signed with the American label Metal Blade Records, with plans to release their second album. The launch was postponed until 2021 due to the COVID-19 pandemic. During this time, the band released an EP titled Omega Severer, featuring one new track, "Omega Sever," and a reworked track from their earlier EP Aurora Majesty, "Of Blade and Carapace."

=== Etemen Ænka (2021–2023) ===
In March 2021, DVNE released their critically acclaimed album Etemen Ænka, a 10-track concept album exploring the rise and fall of a civilisation led by god-like figures who have attained eternal life. The album's narrative delves into themes such as social class struggles, human relationships with technology, and power dynamics.

The album received widespread acclaim and was frequently listed among the best albums of 2021 by publications such as Metal Hammer (UK), The Heavy Blog Is Heavy, and Vision Mag (Germany). DVNE also won the "Best Metal" award at the Scottish Alternative Music Awards in the same year.

During the Etemen Ænka album cycle, DVNE toured extensively across the United Kingdom and Europe, including a European tour with Déluge and touring runs with Bossk, Villagers of Ioannina City, and Pijn.

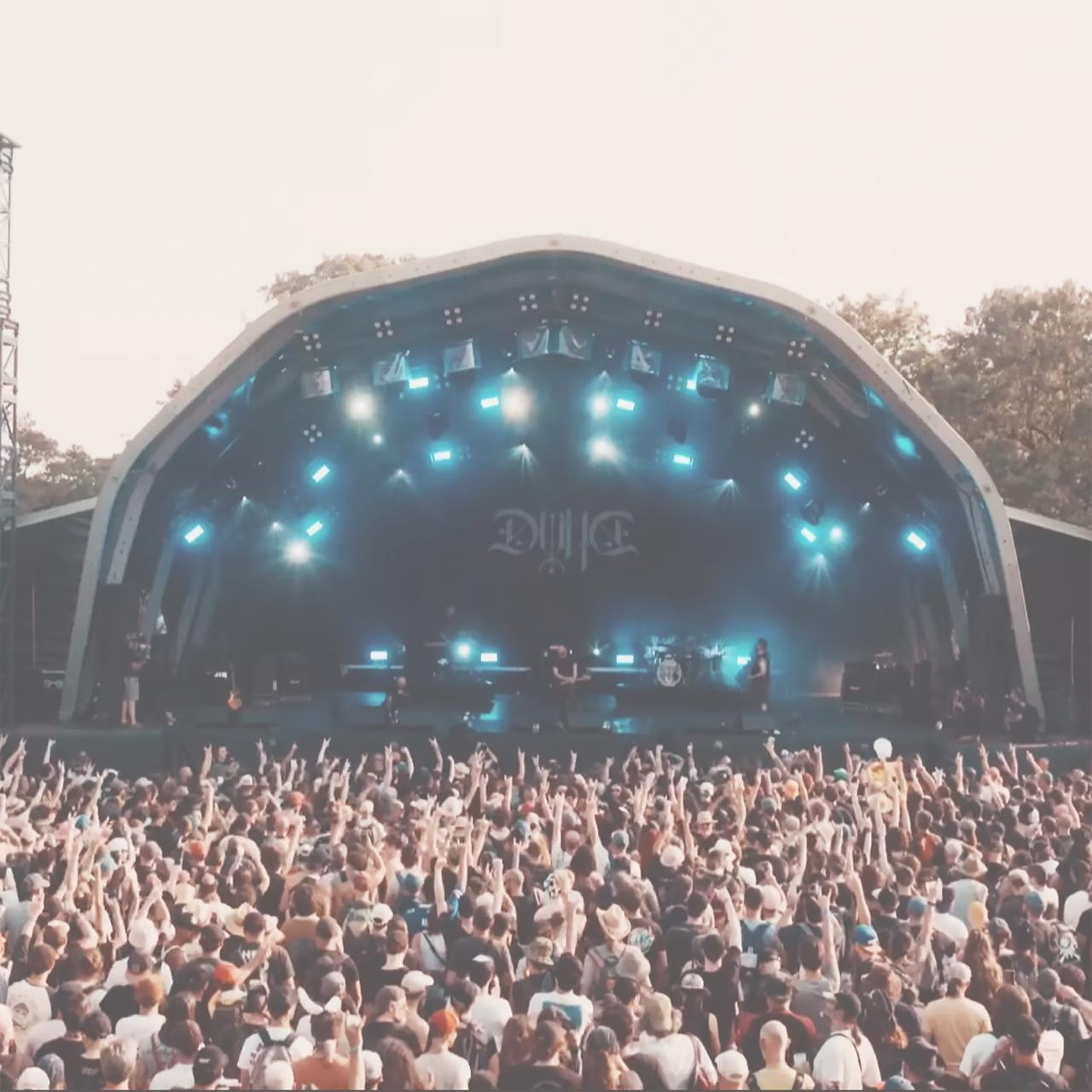
Dvne live at Hellfest 2023 - The Valley Stage

Dvne also performed at prestigious festivals such as Damnation Festival (UK, 2021), Desertfest London (UK, 2022), Desertfest Berlin (Germany, 2022), ArcTanGent (UK, 2022 & 2023), Hellfest (France, 2023), and Resurrection Festival (Spain, 2023).

=== Voidkind (2024–present) ===
In April 2024, DVNE released their third album, Voidkind, via Metal Blade Records. This time, the album's concept was based on the Hyperion Cantos series of novels and explored themes of religion and fanaticism.

The album received positive reviews from critics, who highlighted its creative focus, raw energy and dynamic sound. Voidkind also appeared on several end-of-year lists, ranking at number 18 on Metal Hammer’s list of the 50 best albums of 2024.

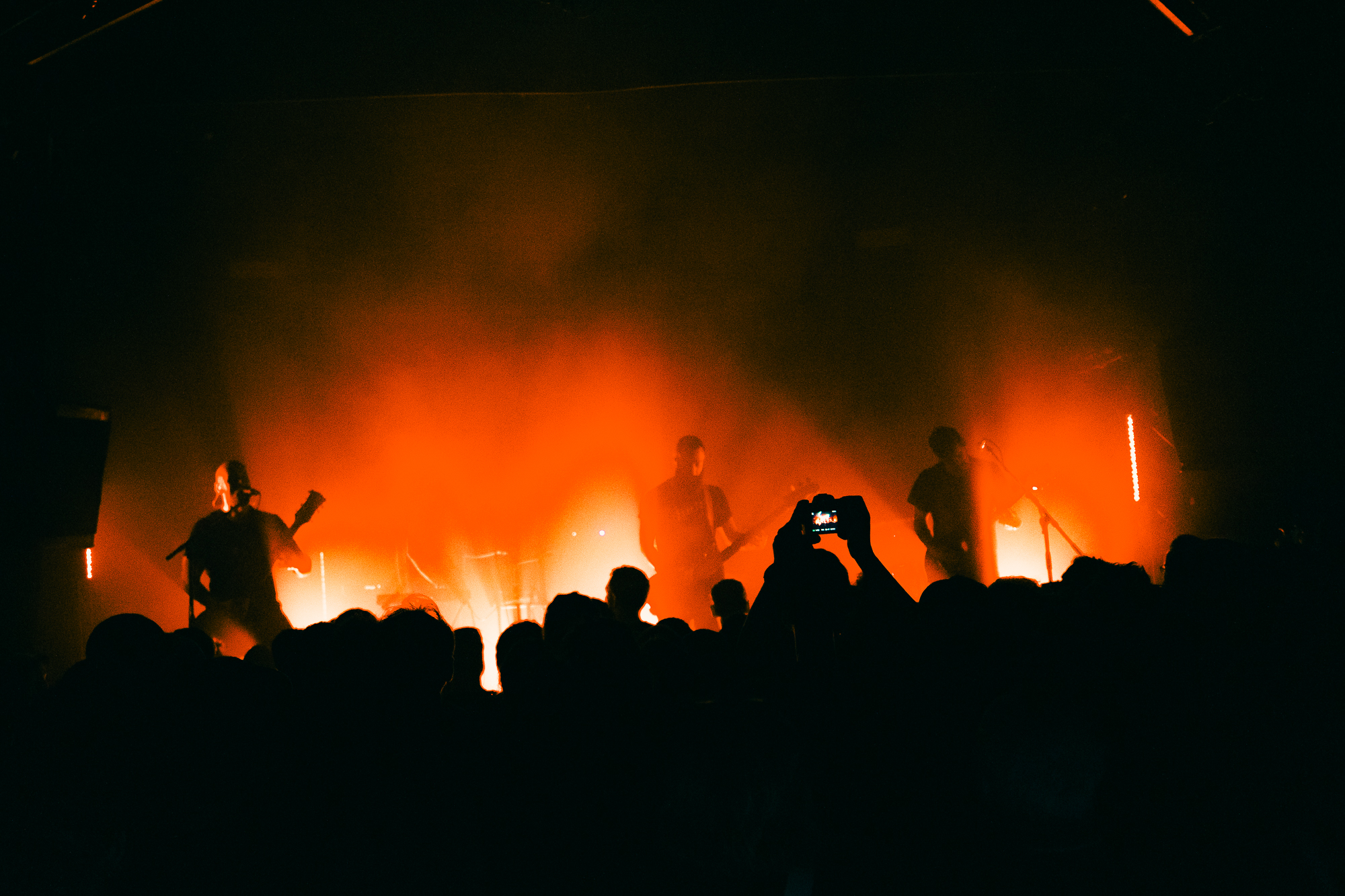
Dvne live during the Voidkind album cycle 2024 2

The band supported the album with a full European headlining tour alongside fellow British band Conjurer and Belgian band My Diligence, with appearances at festivals including Desertfest London, Dunk Festival (Ghent, Belgium), Mystic Festival (Poland), Into the Grave Festival (Netherlands), Copenhell (Copenhagen, Denmark), Motocultor Festival (France), and Soulcrusher (Netherlands).

In April 2025, the band released DVNE – Live at the Biscuit Factory, a live session recorded at their rehearsal studio in Edinburgh and featuring four tracks from Voidkind. The performance was released on streaming platforms and YouTube.

Later in 2025, DVNE undertook a 27-date headline tour across the United Kingdom and Europe. That summer the band returned to the festival circuit with appearances including Fumega Fest in Spain, ArcTanGent in the United Kingdom, marking their third appearance at the festival, and Rock for People in the Czech Republic.

In September 2025 the band toured Europe and the United Kingdom alongside Night Verses, followed by additional performances including an appearance at Westill Festival in Vallet, France.

During this period DVNE also released Live at Hellfest 2023, a remixed and remastered recording of their performance at Hellfest, distributed on streaming platforms and YouTube.

The Voidkind touring cycle concluded with a European tour alongside Igorrr, comprising twenty shows.

== Members ==
=== Current members ===
- Victor Vicart - guitar, vocals & keys (2013–present)
- Dudley Tait - drums (2013–present)
- Daniel Barter - guitar, vocals (2013–present)
- Alexandros Keros - bass (2021-2022 & 2024–present)
- Maxime Keller - keys & backing vocals (2022–present)

- Allan Paterson - bass (2016-2018) & bass/guitar (2021-2024)
- Jack Kavanagh - bass/guitar (2018-2019)
