= Blessed & Cursed (disambiguation) =

Blessed & Cursed is a 2010 album by Devil Sold His Soul.

Blessed & Cursed may also refer to:

- Blessed & Cursed (film), a 2010 film starring Kierra Sheard
- Blessed and Cursed (Amulet album), a 2007 album by Amulet
