= Bossk =

Bossk can refer to:

- Bossk (band), a post-metal band from Kent
- Bossk (Star Wars), a character from the Star Wars franchise
