= Empire of Light (disambiguation) =

Empire of Light is a 2022 British romantic drama film.

Empire of Light may also refer to:

- Empire of Light (album), by Devil Sold His Soul, 2012
- The Empire of Light (French: L'Empire des lumières, lit. 'The Empire of Lights'), a succession of paintings by René Magritte
