= Suns of the Tundra =

English rock band

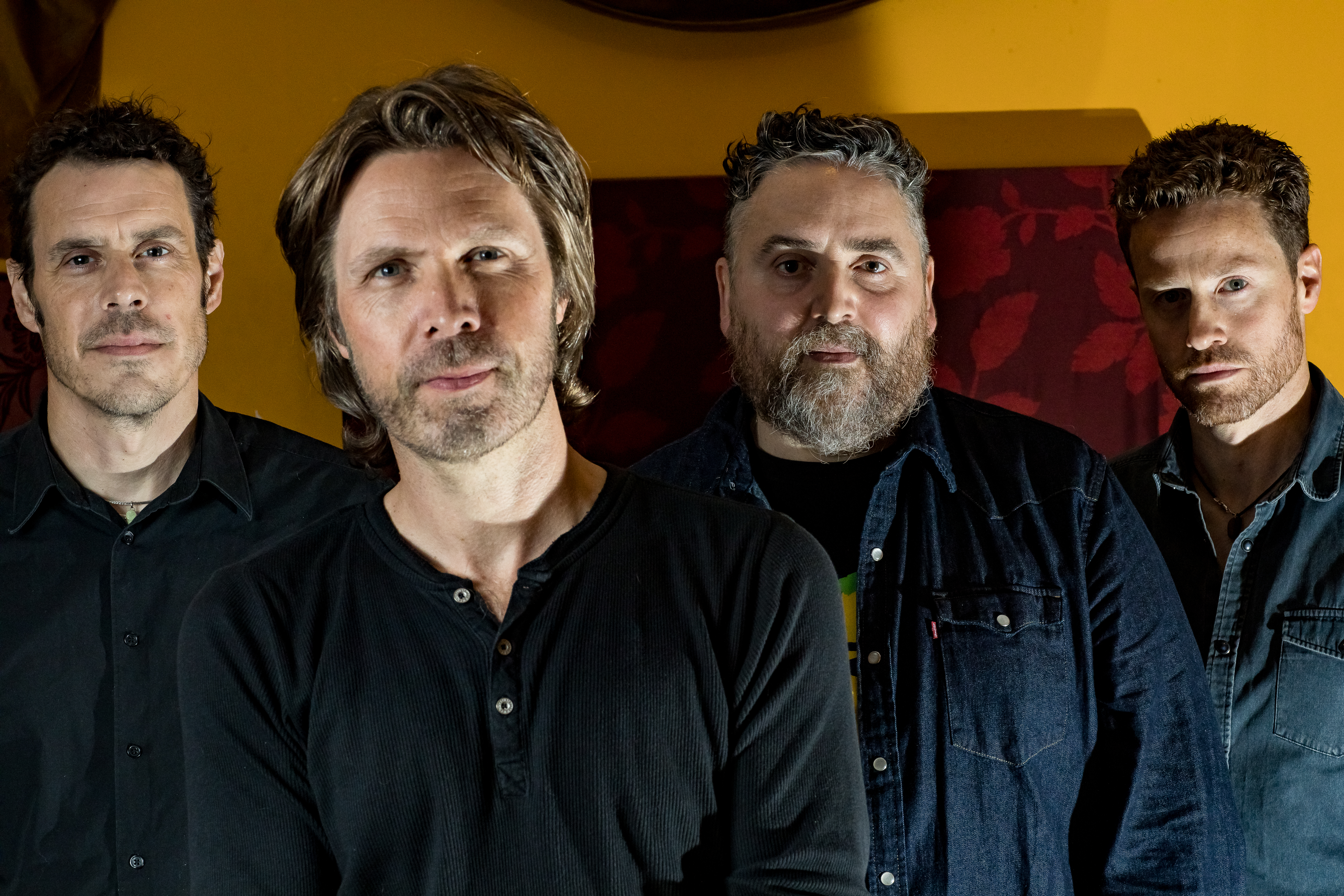
- Suns of the Tundra in 2019

Background information
- Origin: London
- Genres: Progressive metal, progressive rock, post-rock, alternative rock
- Years active: 2002–present
- Labels: Bad Elephant, Shiny Mack
- Members: Simon Oakes; Mark Moloney; Andy Marlow; Andrew Prestidge; Rob Havis
- Website: sunsofthetundra.co.uk

Suns of the Tundra are an English rock band that formed in 2002. Members include Simon Oakes (guitar, vocals), Mark Moloney (guitar), Andy Marlow (bass, backing vocals), Andrew Prestidge (drums), and Rob Havis. They have released four studio albums and one EP which individually span several genres including progressive metal, progressive rock, post rock, and alternative rock. Their fifth studio album, The Only Equation, was released on 16 June 2023.

== History ==
=== Early years, Suns of the Tundra, and Tunguska ===
Suns of the Tundra began as a collaboration in 2002 between Simon Oakes, Rob Havis, and Andrew Prestidge, drawing on influences from Rush, King Crimson, and Van der Graaf Generator to Tool and Mastodon. Oakes was inspired to re-explore harder alternative rock following the successful re-release of the album Giving Birth to a Stone by his former band Peach which included future Tool bassist Justin Chancellor. Suns of the Tundra released their eponymous first album Suns Of The Tundra (album) in 2004, around which time Tool began to include the Peach songs, You Lied and Spasm, in their live shows. Havis (bass) left the band in 2005, was replaced by Andy Marlow, and the line-up soon grew to include Mark Moloney and Lazlo Pallagi (additional vocals). The band released their second album Tunguska in 2006.

=== Bones of Brave Ships ===
While finishing work on Tunguska, Simon Oakes attended a London film festival showing of South, a silent 1919 documentary chronicling Ernest Shackleton's trans-Antarctic expeditions, and said his "eye had been caught" by its "stunning still images" on permanent display at London's Royal Geographical Society. The band soon began work on what would become a sprawling and intricate soundtrack written to accompany the movie. Starting from jams in the summer and winter of 2006, a rough demo was recorded in mid-2008. Oakes noted that "writing a film soundtrack was a big breakthrough in sound for us because so much of it was instrumental .... We experimented a lot more with post-rock ambience and bringing in more keyboards, from Moog to piano. We even played back all the ambient tracks ... at loud volume in a 15th-century abbey." The soundtrack was eventually released in 2015 as their third studio album Bones of Brave Ships, a title taken from the diary of expedition member Commander Frank Worsley, who described wreckage on a South Georgia beach as the "... bones of brave ships and bones of brave men." It was mastered to be synchronized with the film's DVD or its British Film Institute website download.

=== Murmuration ===
Suns of the Tundra released their fourth studio album Murmuration in 2019. It includes songs developed over the band's long career including Pond Life, the origins of which date back to Simon Oakes' time in Peach. Murmuration has a "wide palette", exhibiting a "variety of moods and styles", "psychedelic vibes", and "reveals a more stripped down and succinct approach to the band's skewed post-metal barrage." Oakes said the band is "... enormously proud of this record. It's another style evolution, particularly in the wide range of different rhythms Andy [Prestidge] is playing, from stately 7/8 uber-prog beats, through to metronomic trance beats and into really heavy stuff with double-pedal kicks."

=== The Only Equation ===
Suns of the Tundra wrote their fifth studio album during the COVID-19 lockdown in the United Kingdom which was recorded between August and December 2022. Simon Oakes attributed a faster writing process due to the lockdown. The album's working title was Tundra V which Andrew Prestige later called The Only Equation. An intense work of complex sound, it refines the unique aesthetic presented in Murmuration, comprising a supremely confident, ambitious, and well executed slice of heavier progressive rock. Al Murray contributed additional drums to tracks 6–8.

=== Suns of the Tundra (20th Anniversary Remix) ===
Suns of the Tundra released a remix of their eponymous debut album on January 15, 2025, to celebrate its 20th anniversary. Simon Oakes stated that he and Andy Marlow created the original mix but "... were never that happy with the results." He said the new mix brings "... out elements of the music that weren't as clear in the original, giving the album a whole more power while also shining a light on a lot of little details and Easter [e]ggs people might not have realised were there before." The remix includes new rhythm guitar parts by Mark Moloney.

== Other projects ==
In 1996, after leaving the band Peach, Simon Oakes co-founded the alt-rock band Geyser (later called Grand Western) with ex-Peach drummer Rob Havis. Over the decades its lineup, including live shows, has included Adam Wolters (bass), Al Murray (drums), Andrew Prestidge, and Mark Moloney. In 2016, the band released the EP Babytalk. In 2017, the band appeared in the same line-up as Phil Collins and Blondie at British Summer Time Hyde Park.

Circa 2006 Suns of the Tundra wrote the music for the BAFTA-nominated Discovering Antarctica online education resource developed by the Royal Geographical Society in partnership with the British Antarctic Survey.

In 2007 Andy Marlow joined the neo-prog band Jadis.

In 2013 Prestidge co-founded the band The Osiris Club in which Oakes first appeared as a co-writer and later a co-lead singer. Prestidge has also played with Warning, Lucifer, and Angel Witch.

Suns of the Tundra are longtime collaborators with writer and actor Ben Moor, having written scores for many of his live performances, and he having contributed readings to their live performances of Bones of Brave Ships.

== Band members ==
=== Current members ===
- Simon Oakes
- Mark Moloney
- Rob Havis
- Andy Marlow
- Andrew Prestidge

=== Former members ===
- Al Murray
- Hanna Pettersson
- Laszlo Pallagi

== Discography ==
=== Studio albums ===
- Suns of the Tundra (2004)
- Tunguska (2006)
- Bones of Brave Ships (2015)
- Murmuration (2019)
- The Only Equation (2023)

=== EPs ===
- Illuminate (2009)

=== Remixes ===
- Suns of the Tundra (20th Anniversary Remix) (2025)

=== Compilations ===
- Almost the Right People (2009)
