= 40 Watt Sun =

British rock band

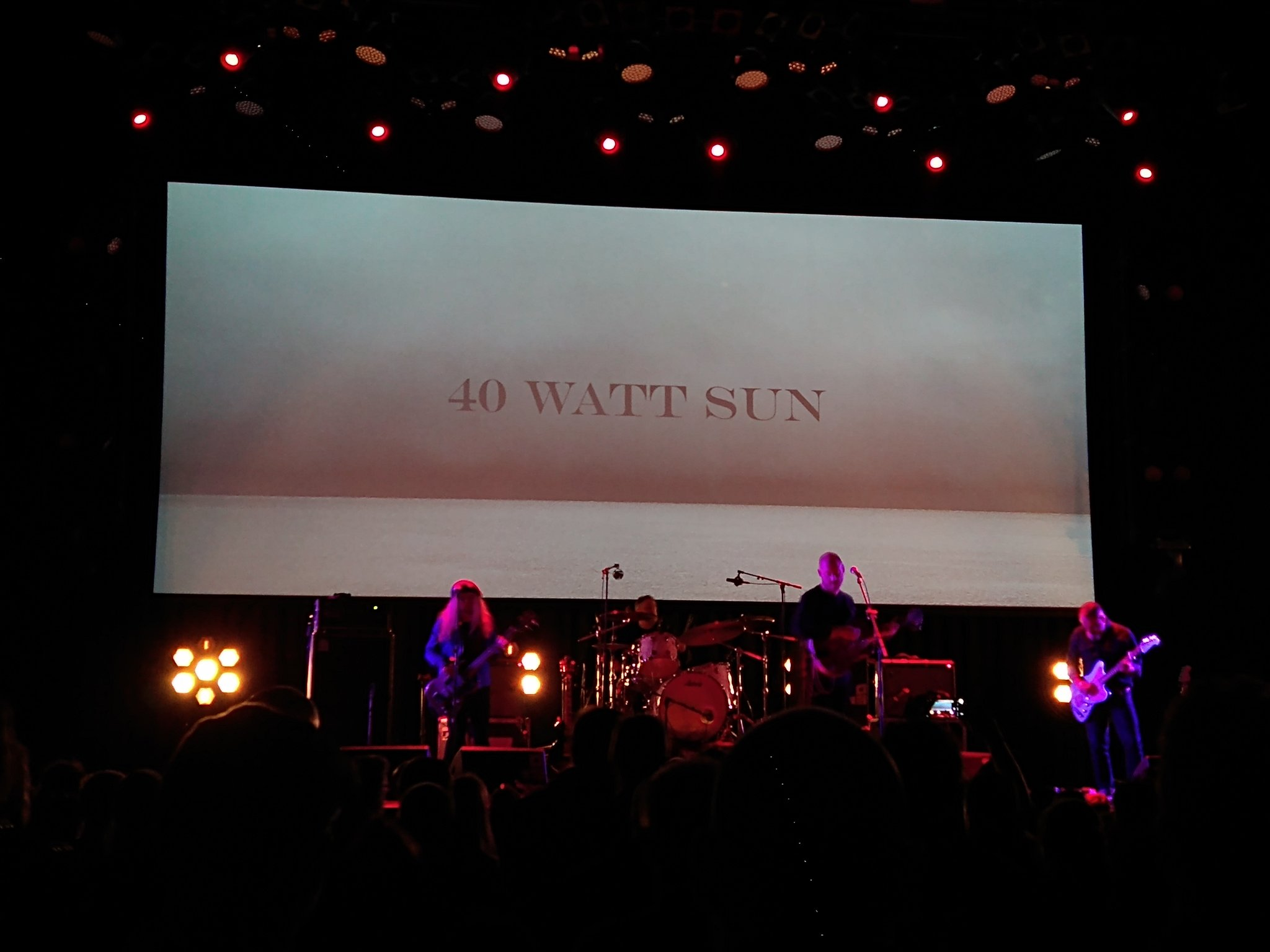
- 40 Watt Sun performing in 2022

Background information
- Origin: London, England
- Genres: Alternative rock, slowcore, chamber folk, post-metal, doom metal
- Years active: 2009–present
- Labels: Svart Records (current), Metal Blade, Cyclone Empire, Radiance
- Spinoff of: Warning
- Members: Patrick Walker
- Past members: Christian Leitch; William Spong
- Website: 40wattsun.co.uk

40 Watt Sun is the musical project of British singer, guitarist and songwriter Patrick Walker, founded in early 2009 following the dissolution of his previous band, Warning, one of the most important, highly regarded and influential bands to emerge from the ‘90s doom metal scene.

Initially formed as a three-piece with drummer Christian Leitch and bassist/producer William Spong, 40 Watt Sun is now the project of Patrick Walker as its centre and sole stable member, alongside a group of revolving musicians.

Hank Shteamer of Rolling Stone magazine has described the band's music as "a poetic, gradually unfolding dirge rock."

== History ==
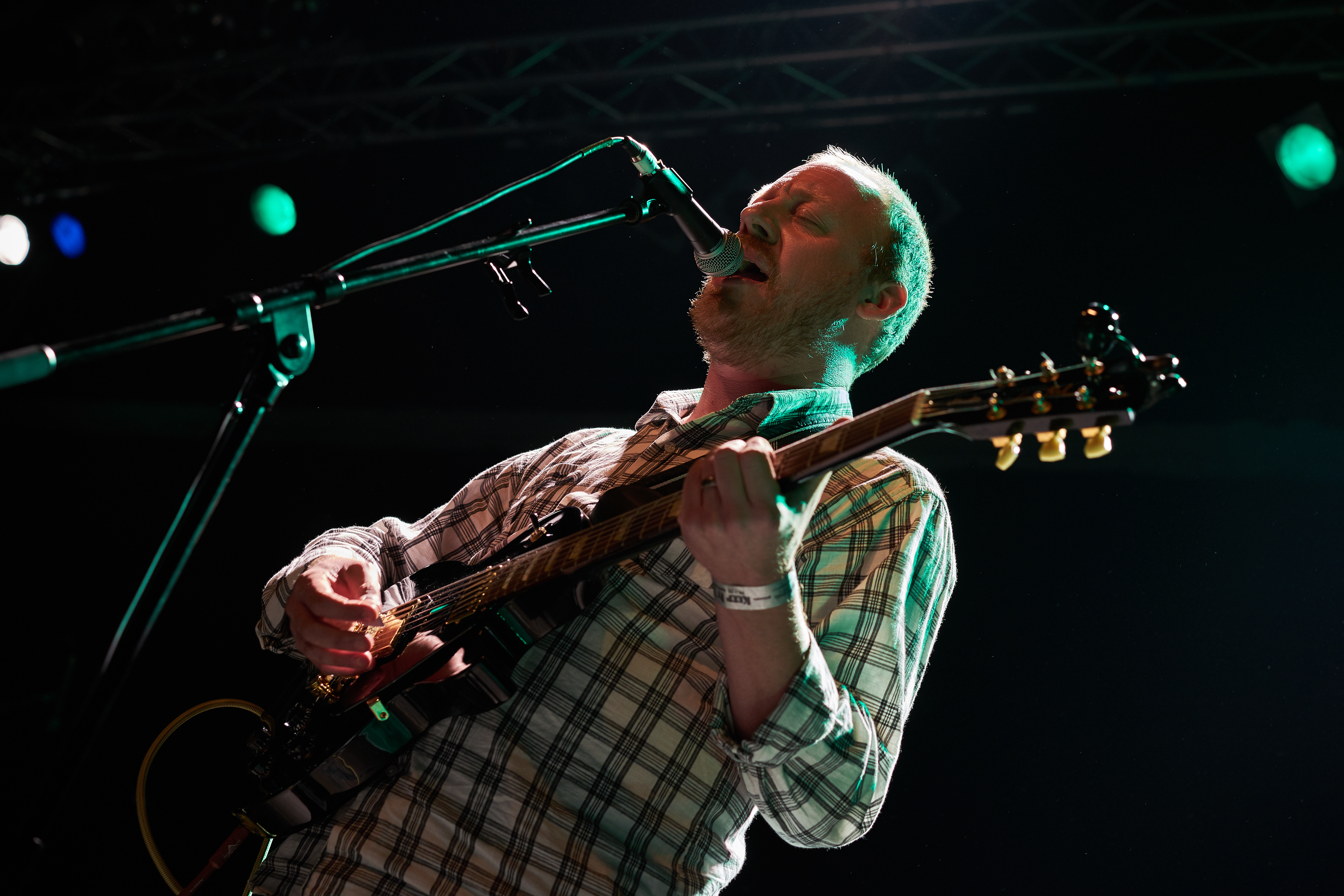
Patrick Walker in 2015

The band recorded its debut album, The Inside Room, in little over twenty-four hours at The Library Studio in London. Produced entirely by the band, and mixed and mastered by bass player William Spong, the album was released in Europe by Cyclone Empire and in North America by Metal Blade Records.

In September 2011, 40 Watt Sun toured North America in support of The Inside Room. The following December The Inside Room was named by Pitchfork as the fourth best metal album of 2011. PopMatters included the album in their 75 Best Albums of 2011, writing "The Inside Room... is a bona fide underground metal masterpiece... It’s an extraordinary debut — an unquestionably transcendent work of art that deserves a lot more exposure."

In 2015, the band self-produced their second album, Wider than the Sky, at Giant Wafer Studios in Wales. In a 2016 interview with Vice magazine, Walker explained how 40 Watt Sun's new recordings were not well received by their heavily metal-orientated label Cyclone Empire, and he spent the next year-and-a-half trying to bargain the band's way out of its contract. Wider than the Sky was eventually released in October 2016, on both the band's own label, Radiance Records, on digital and CD format and on vinyl by Svart Records. Later that year, Rolling Stone magazine featured it among their "20 Best Metal Albums of 2016"

In October 2021, 40 Watt Sun announced its third album, Perfect Light, the first made without the structure of a full, formal band. This time Walker was joined by a selection of guest musicians, including drummer Andrew Prestidge (Warning, Angel Witch, Suns of the Tundra), bass player Lorraine Rath (Amber Asylum/Worm Ouroboros), and pianist/composer Chris Redman. Perfect Light was released in January 2022, on physical formats by Svart Records and digitally by Cappio Records. The first vinyl pressing would include a bonus 12" single featuring two alternative versions of album tracks, including a version of Reveal recorded with Emma Ruth Rundle. Of Perfect Light, The Quietus wrote that it was "an even more affective and effective experience than its predecessor, and one of Walker's most beautiful and heartfelt records to date", while Bandcamp Daily said "the album reaffirms that Walker is one of our finest living songwriters." In December 2022, Pitchfork included Perfect Light in its "The 38 Best Rock Albums of 2022" feature, writing, "Perfect Light is destined to be passed among fans of immersive mood music meant to soundtrack our lowest moments."

== Influences ==
Patrick Walker has cited among his biggest musical influences neo-progressive rock band Marillion, English folk singer June Tabor, and John Brenner (of the band Revelation).

Walker took the band's name from a lyric in the song Emerald Lies by Marillion.

== Band members ==
During live performances, Patrick Walker has most recently been accompanied by:

- Roland Scriver – guitars (2020–present)
- Alasdair C. Mitchell – bass guitar (2018–present)
- Andrew Prestidge – drums (2018–present)

Former members

- Christian Leitch – drums (2009–2016)
- William Spong – bass guitar (2009–2016)

== Discography ==
Studio albums

- The Inside Room (2011)
- Wider than the Sky (2016)
- Perfect Light (2022)
- Little Weight (2024)
