= Darkness Prevails =

EP by Devil Sold His Soul
- Released: 2005
- Genre: Post-hardcore, post-metal, metalcore
- Label: Visible Noise, Eyesofsound
- Producer: Jonny Renshaw

Devil Sold His Soul chronology
Darkness Prevails (2005)	A Fragile Hope (2007)

Professional ratings
Review scores
Source	Rating
Kerrang!	4/5 stars
Rock Sound	(8/10)
Metal Hammer	(7/10)
Big Cheese	5/5 stars

Darkness Prevails is the debut EP from Devil Sold His Soul, released in 2005. It was produced and recorded by Mark Williams at Criterion/Battery Studios, London. It was re-released in 2008 after their debut album A Fragile Hope was released and included bonus tracks and a DVD containing music videos and live footage.

It was rated a four out of ten by Metal Temple Magazine.

== Track listing ==
No.	Title	Length
1.	"Darkness Prevails"	3:46
2.	"Some Friend"	6:05
3.	"Clouds"	3:41
4.	"LIYL"	2:15
5.	"Like It’s Your Last"	7:38
Total length:		23:25

=== Re-release bonus tracks ===
1. "Clouds (Remix)"
2. "Darkness Prevails (Final Demo)"
3. "Some Friend (Original Demo)"
4. "Clouds (Final Demo)"
5. "Like It's Your Last (Original Demo)"

=== Bonus DVD ===
1. "Darkness Prevails" (music video)
2. "Clouds" (music video)
3. "Like It's Your Last" (music video)
4. "Recording" (studio video)
5. "Darkness Prevails" (live video)
6. "Like It's Your Last" (live video)
7. "The Starting" (live video)
