= Disfigured Narcissus =

Studio album by Gutworm
- Released: 2007
- Recorded: 2007
- Genre: Death metal
- Label: Anticulture Records

Gutworm chronology
Ruin The Memory (2004)	Disfigured Narcissus (2007)

Disfigured Narcissus is an album by the British death metal band Gutworm, released in 2007.

== Track listing ==
1. Intro (Silence)
2. My First Loving Enemy
3. Disfigured Narcissus
4. Omniscient Dreams
5. Imperfect Harmony
6. Fires That Burn
7. Sentiment
8. Unholy Tryst
9. Scrape The Blood (Off The Face Of Life)
10. Outro (The Deafening)
