= Ruin the Memory =

Ruin The Memory

Studio album by Gutworm
- Released: 2004
- Recorded: 2004
- Genre: Death metal
- Length: 38:47
- Label: Anticulture

Gutworm chronology
Torn From Me (2000)	Ruin The Memory (2004)	Disfigured Narcissus (2007)

Ruin The Memory is an album by British heavy metal band Gutworm, released in 2004 through Anticulture Records.

== Track listing ==
1. What You Are - 3:00
2. Loveless - 4:49
3. Below Within - 2:42
4. Obscure Devotion - 5:52
5. Saturate in Sadness - 2:19
6. Sick Inside - 5:20
7. Blind from Truth - 3:37
8. Incineration - 1:54
9. Twisted - 4:53
10. Reborn - 4:11
