= Bossk (band) =

British post-metal band

- Origin: Ashford, Kent, England, UK
- Genres: Post-metal, stoner rock, sludge metal
- Years active: 2005–2008, 2012–present
- Labels: QnotQ, Eyesofsound, Deathwish
- Members: Tom Begley; Nick Corney; Simon Wright; Alex Hamilton; Rob Vaughan
- Past members: John Simmons; Andrew Waghorn; Sam Marsh
- Website: bossk.org

Bossk are a British post-metal band formed in Ashford, Kent in 2005.

== History ==
Bossk are named after a minor alien character in The Empire Strikes Back. Following their 2006 debut release, .1, on the QnotQ label, they toured extensively with a number of bands, including Cult of Luna, The Ocean, Yndi Halda and Baroness.

Bossk .2 was released by Eyesofsound in October 2007. Touring on the back of the release saw the band play shows throughout the UK with Devil Sold His Soul and Ephel Duath, and with Cult of Luna and Humanfly on continental Europe.

During early 2008, after a tour around the UK with Kruger, original members Nick Corney and Rob Vaughan left the band. Replacements were found and Bossk toured with Textures for a brief stint in the Netherlands. In May 2008 the band played their 200th show and their first headline show at the Islington Academy in London.

In October of the same year Bossk broke up. Two final shows were played and the .3 video EP was released, along with a trilogy box-set of all their EPs. In August 2009, a split with Rinoa was released. This featured a soundboard recording of a new song which was to be used on the album the band were working on before they called it a day.

In February 2012, the band announced plans to record a live BBC Maida Vale session and play two shows at a later date. In 2012, Bossk released the single "Pick Up Artist" through the American indie hardcore punk label Deathwish Inc. Three years later in 2016, Bossk released its debut album titled Audio Noir, also released through Deathwish.

Bossk released Migration in 2021 and performed their first headline tour since 2007 in December 2021 alongside Dvne, supporting this release, along with an appearance at ArcTanGent in 2022. They also performed at Damnation Festival's "Night of Salvation" pre-show and Bloodstock Festival in 2023.

== Members ==
Current

- Tom Begley – bass
- Nick Corney – drums
- Simon Wright – vocals
- Alex Hamilton – guitar
- Rob Vaughan – guitar, vocals

Former

- John Simmons – drums
- Andrew Waghorn – guitar
- Sam Marsh – vocals

== Discography ==
Studio albums

- Audio Noir (2016)
- Migration (2021)
- .4 (2024)

EPs

- .1 (2006)
- .2 (2007)

Splits and singles

- Bossk / Rinoa (split with Rinoa) (2009)
- Pick Up Artist / Albatross (2013)
- HTV-3 (2021)

Compilations

- .1 / .2 (2008)

Video albums

- .3 (2008)
