= Deathfest =

Music festival at the University of Leeds, England

- Genre: Death metal
- Dates: May
- Locations: University of Leeds, England
- Years active: 2009 – 2010
- Website: www.deathfest.co.uk

The Deathfest was a one-day music festival currently held annually in May at the University of Leeds, England. It was organised by Gavin McInally, who is also the organiser of the Damnation Festival.

== Deathfest 2009 ==
The first annual Deathfest took place on Sunday 3 May 2009 at the University of Leeds. It billed 17 bands over two stages and tickets cost £19.50. Festival headliners were Vader and Leng Tch'e.

Deathfest 2009
Terrorizer Stage	PHD Stage
Vader; Repulsion; Origin; Akercocke; Benediction; The Rotted; Desecration; Ingested; Neuroma	Leng Tch'e; Lazarus Blackstar; Reth; Black Sun; Infected Disarray; Dragged Into Sunlight; Esclavage

== Deathfest 2010 "The Second Coming" ==
The second annual Deathfest took place on Sunday 2 May 2010 at Leeds University. It billed 16 bands over two stages and tickets cost £19.50. Festival headliners were Brujeria and Ramesses.

Deathfest 2010
Terrorizer Stage	PHD Stage
Brujeria; Immolation; Negura Bunget; Hour of Pennance; Amputated; Infestation; Dawn of Chaos; Revokation	Ramnesses; Abgott; Wormrot; Fukpig; Palehorse; Volition; The Way of Purity; IRG

== The end ==
Following the 2010 festival the organizers announced that 2010 would be the last installment for the festival. Due to poor ticket sales they could no longer afford to keep the festival going. However, its sister festival, Damnation, returned for its sixth installment later in 2010.
