= A Fragile Hope =

Studio album by Devil Sold His Soul
- Released: 18 June 2007
- Genre: Post-hardcore, post-metal
- Length: 52:10
- Label: Eyesofsound/Black Willow
- Producer: Jonny Renshaw, John Dent

Devil Sold His Soul chronology
Darkness Prevails (2005)	A Fragile Hope (2007)	Blessed & Cursed (2010)

Professional ratings
Review scores
Source	Rating
Kerrang!	4/5 stars
Rock Sound	(8/10)
Big Cheese	4.5/5 stars
Terrorizer	(9/10)

A Fragile Hope is the debut full-length album by English metalcore band Devil Sold His Soul, released through Eyesofsound/Black Willow on 18 June 2007. Dave Robinson (of Fireapple Red) performs all drums and percussion on the album, and Matt Elphick performs guest vocals on "Awaiting the Flood" and "Coroner".

== Track listing ==
No.	Title	Length
1.	"In the Absence of Light"	2:23
2.	"As the Storm Unfolds"	6:11
3.	"The Starting"	6:34
4.	"Sirens Chant"	4:15
5.	"At the End of the Tunnel"	4:22
6.	"Between Two Words"	7:49
7.	"Awaiting the Flood"	4:27
8.	"Dawn of the First Day"	7:07
9.	"The Coroner"	4:32
10.	"Hope"	4:30
Total length:		52:10

== Personnel ==
Devil Sold His Soul

- Ed Gibbs – vocals
- Jonny Renshaw – guitar
- Richard Chapple – guitar
- Ian Trotter – bass guitar
- Paul Kitney – samples
- Dave Robinson – drums

Additional musicians

- Matt Elphick – guest vocals on "Awaiting the Flood" and "Coroner"

Production

- Produced by Jonny Renshaw and Devil Sold His Soul
- Engineered and mixed by Jonny Renshaw
- Mastered by John Dent
