= Blessed & Cursed =

Studio album by Devil Sold His Soul
- Released: 12 July 2010
- Recorded: Bandit Studios, Tetbury
- Genre: Post-hardcore, post-metal
- Length: 63:24
- Label: Century Media
- Producer: Jonny Renshaw, Devil Sold His Soul

Devil Sold His Soul chronology
A Fragile Hope (2007)	Blessed & Cursed (2010)	Empire of Light (2012)

Professional ratings
Review scores
Source	Rating
Alter The Press!	(4/5)
DEAD PRESS!	10/10 stars
Rock Sound	(9/10)

Blessed & Cursed is the second full-length album by Devil Sold His Soul, released by Century Media on 12 July 2010. On its first week of release, the album sold over 700 copies. It was the last studio album to feature Iain Trotter on bass, following his departure from the band in January 2011.

== Track listing ==
All music is composed by Devil Sold His Soul

No.	Title	Length
1.	"Tides"	3:40
2.	"Drowning/Sinking"	7:46
3.	"Callous Heart"	6:21
4.	"An Ocean of Lights"	5:48
5.	"Frozen"	7:50
6.	"The Disappointment" (featuring Andrew Neufeld of Comeback Kid)	6:48
7.	"Crane Lake"	6:53
8.	"A Foreboding Sky"	8:38
9.	"The Weight of Faith" (featuring Perry Bryan of Rinoa)	4:14
10.	"Truth Has Come"	6:05
Total length:		1:03:24

Bonus Tracks
No.	Title	Length
11.	"The Emptiness"	5:16
12.	"Death Surrounds You"	5:47
13.	"Fade to the Grave"	5:31
14.	"Let The Rain In"	4:45
Total length:		1:25:03

== Personnel ==
Devil Sold His Soul

- Ed Gibbs – vocals
- Ian Trotter – bass guitar
- Paul Kitney – samples
- Leks Wood – drums
- Jonny Renshaw – guitar
- Rick Chapple – guitar, piano, organ

Additional vocals

- Guest vocals on "The Disappointment" – Andrew Neufeld of Comeback Kid and Sights & Sounds
- Guest vocals on "The Weight of Faith" – Perry Bryan of Rinoa
- Group vocals on "Drowning / Sinking" – Perry Bryan, Jozef Norocky, James May, Matthew Holden and David Gumbleton of Rinoa, Leo Dorsz, Tommy Renshaw and Devil Sold His Soul
- Group vocals on "Truth Has Come" – Devil Sold His Soul

Production

- Produced by Jonny Renshaw and Devil Sold His Soul
- Recorded and Engineered by Jonny Renshaw
- Strings and Brass written and arranged by Devil Sold His Soul
- Strings and Brass programmed by Tommy Renshaw
- Mixing – Steve Evetts
- Mastering – Alan Douches
- Artwork, layout – Jon Barmby
