= Fen (band) =

English black metal band

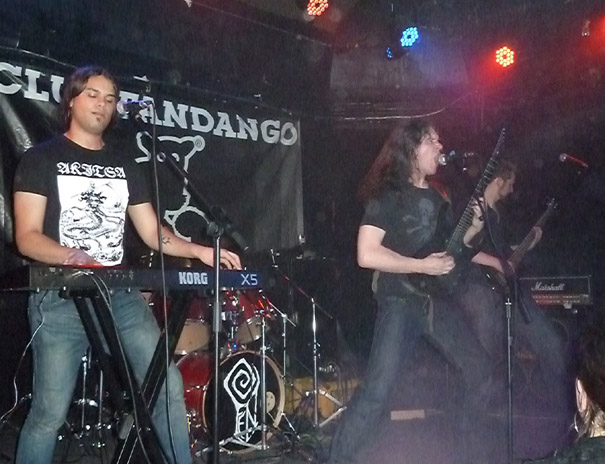
- Fen live at the Bull & Gate, Kentish Town, London

Background information
- Origin: The Fens, England
- Genres: Atmospheric black metal; post-black metal; blackgaze
- Years active: 2006–present
- Labels: Code666 Records; Eisenwald; Nordvis; Northern Silence; Prophecy Productions
- Members: The Watcher (guitar, vocals); Grungyn (bass, backing vocals); JG (drums)
- Website: www.myspace.com/fenband

Fen is a post-black metal band formed in 2006 and originating in the Fens of the East of England, a region from which the band draws much of their inspiration. They have released seven full-length studio albums and two EPs, and are currently signed to German label Prophecy Productions.

== History ==
In 2006, Fen recorded the Ancient Sorrow demo, which was later re-released as an EP on both CD and vinyl by Northern Silence Productions. In January 2009, they released their first full-length album The Malediction Fields on Italian label Code666 Records, which was followed by their February 2011 album Epoch on the same label. Epoch received positive reviews in Metal Hammer (8/10), and Terrorizer (7.5/10), with the track 'A Waning Solace' being included in Terrorizer's "10 Essential Metal Anthems" list in April 2011.

Three more albums followed on Code666, Dustwalker in 2013, Carrion Skies a year later, and Winter in 2017. The band were able to promote Dustwalker by joining Agalloch on a 28-date European tour. After the release of Winter, frontman "The Watcher" prepared to release Oathbearer, the debut album of his other musical project Fellwarden. In 2019, Fen released the tracks from a past split-album as the EP Stone and Sea on German label Eisenwald, before moving onto the roster of another German label, Prophecy Productions. Since joining Prophecy, Fen have released two full-length albums, The Dead Light at the end of 2019, and Monuments to Absence in the summer of 2023. "The Watcher" described Monuments to Absence as "a focused attempt to harness" anger.

== Band members ==
Current members

- Frank "The Watcher" Allain – vocals, guitars (2006–present), synthesizers (2012–present)
- Adam "Grungyn" Allain – bass, vocals (2006–present)
- JG – drums (2020–present)

Former members

- Daniel "Theutus" Spender – drums (2006–2012)
- "Draugluin" – synths (2006–2011)
- Æðelwalh – synths (2011–2012)
- Paul "Derwydd" Westwood – drums (2012–2016)
- Pete "Havenless" Aplin - drums (2016–2020)

Timeline

== Discography ==
Studio albums

- The Malediction Fields (2009)
- Epoch (2011)
- Dustwalker (2013)
- Carrion Skies (2014)
- Winter (2017)
- The Dead Light (2019)
- Monuments to Absence (2023)
- Elemental Part One: Mourning Earth (2026)

EPs

- Ancient Sorrow (2007)
- Stone and Sea (2019)

Splits

- Towards the Shores of the End (Fen / De Arma, 2011)
- Call of Ashes II / Stone and Sea (Fen / Sleepwalker, 2016)

Others

- Ancient Sorrow (2006)
- Onset of Winter (2008)
- Better Undead Than Alive 2 (various artists, 2009)
- Der Wanderer über dem Nebelmeer (various artist, 2010)
- Toteninsel (various artists, 2012)
- Önd - A Tribute (various artists, 2012)
