= Baptized in Blood =

Canadian heavy metal band

- Origin: London, Ontario, Canada
- Genres: Thrash metal, metalcore, crossover thrash (early)
- Years active: 2004–2012
- Label: Roadrunner Records
- Past members: Johl Fendley; Josh Torrance; Alex Johnston; Jason Longo; Jay Westman; Adam Trakinskas; Brad Nassar; Matthew Harris

Baptized in Blood was a five-piece London, Ontario-based heavy metal band. They were managed by Dave Mustaine, the frontman of American thrash metal band Megadeth.

In 2006, they independently released the EP Baptized in Blood. In 2009, they independently released the album Gutterbound. That led to their being signed to Roadrunner Records, in December 2009. They stayed with Roadrunner for three years, releasing one album, also called Baptized in Blood. In 2021, Cursed Blessing Records re-released Gutterbound.

From 2009 through 2011, Baptized in Blood toured the US and Europe. They supported Fear Before on their final Canadian tour in August and September 2009. They played several European festivals, including the 2011 Download Festival. Their last concert was at Heavy T.O. 2011.

== Band members ==
- Johl Fendley – lead vocals (2004–2012)
- Josh Torrance – guitars (2004–2012)
- Nick Bertelsen – guitars (2004–2012)
- Alex Johnston – drums (2007–2010, 2011–2012)
- Jason Longo – drums (2010–2010)
- Jay Westman – drums (2006–2007)
- Adam Trakinskas – lead vocals (2004–2007)
- Brad Nassar – bass, backing vocals (2004–2006)
- Matthew Harris - bass, backing vocals (2006 - 2012)

== Discography ==
Year	Album	Type	Label
2006	Baptized in Blood	EP	Independent
2009	Gutterbound	Full-length	Independent
2010	Baptized in Blood	Full-length	Roadrunner Records
