= Gutworm =

British extreme metal band

- Origin: Wellingborough, Northamptonshire, England
- Genre: Death metal
- Years active: 1999–2009, 2025
- Label: Anticulture Records
- Members: Neil Hudson, Wayne Minney, Mike Ranzetta, Glen Pywell
- Past members: Carl Davis, Noel Davis, Liam Durrant, Lee Mason
- Website: http://www.gutworm.com

Gutworm were a British death metal band from Wellingborough, Northamptonshire, England, formed in 1999.

== Band history ==
Gutworm recorded their debut EP at Backstage Studios, Nottingham, with producer Dave Chang. This release,Torn From Me, was released early in 2000.

After several tours across the country, Gutworm traveled to the USA and became the first unsigned British band to perform at the November To Dismember Metalfest in California. The band played with acts such as Morbid Angel and Testament, and returned to play at the New Jersey Metal Meltdown, which featured bands such as Nile and The Haunted.

The band signed to European label SPV GmbH and recorded twelve songs at Karo Studios in Germany during March 2001. Following delays that pushed the album release date further back, Gutworm left the label.

After a break, Gutworm resumed touring the country, attracting the attention of British label Anticulture Records, which signed the band in 2003. They recorded an album featuring new material with Greg Chandler of Esoteric at Priory Studios in Birmingham.

Gutworm’s full-length album Ruin The Memory was released nationwide in June 2004. Since the album’s release, Gutworm performed at the Bloodstock Indoor 2004 festival, receiving 4Ks in Kerrang! magazine, and produced a video for album opener "What You Are", broadcast on digital music channels Scuzz and MTV2.

Following a UK tour supporting US technical metallers Byzantine, bassist Carl Davis left in 2005, replaced with Liam Durrant (formerly of UK hardcore bands Freebase and Violation). After UK tours with Maltese metalcore band Slit and French deathgrinders Happy Face, guitarist Noel Davis left, while Durrant took time off to pursue a university course.

With singer and guitarist Neil Hudson and bassist Glen Pywell (from deathgrind/doom band The Atrocity Exhibit), Gutworm recorded their second full-length album, Disfigured Narcissus, with Greg Chandler, released to critical acclaim on Anticulture Records in October 2007.

The band performed their final show in December 2009, featuring previous members. In 2012, Neil Hudson, Carl Davis, Noel Davis, and Wayne Minney returned with the extreme metal project Krysthla.

The band reformed in July 2025 to perform a one-off show, headlining Northants Rocks Festival.

== Band members ==
=== Members ===
- Neil Hudson - vocals and guitar (1999–2010) - formerly of Violation.
- Wayne Minney - drums (1999–2010)
- Glen Pywell - bass (2006–2010) - formerly of The Atrocity Exhibit.
- Mike Ranzetta - guitar (2007–2010) - also of Lordaeron.

=== Former members ===
- Lee Mason - guitar (1999–2007)
- Noel Davis - guitar (1999–2006)
- Carl Davis - bass (1999–2005)
- Liam Durrant - bass (2005–2006) - now playing guitar for Thracia.
- Jamie Hunt - live guitar (2007) - formerly of Biomechanical.

== Discography ==
=== Recordings ===
- 2000 - Torn from Me (Self-released)
- 2004 - Ruin the Memory (Anticulture Records)
- 2007 - Disfigured Narcissus (Anticulture Records)

=== Promotional videos ===
- 2001 - 'Your Demise' (featured on Metal Hammer cover CD)
- 2004 - 'What You Are'
