= Rinoa (band) =

English post-metal band

- Origin: Essex, England
- Genres: Screamo, post-metal, post-rock
- Years active: 2007–2010
- Label: Eyesofsound
- Past members: Perry Bryan; Matthew Holden; David Gumbleton; Jozef Norocky; James May
- Website: www.myspace.com/rinoauk

Rinoa was an English post-metal group, formed in Essex in 2007. Their line-up consisted of vocalist Perry Bryan, guitarists Matthew Holden and Jozef Norocky, bassist David Gumbleton and drummer James May. The band split in November 2010, with most of their members going on to different musical projects.

== History ==
Rinoa was formed in Essex in 2007, following the break-up of the members' previous bands, Crydebris, Chariots and Symmetry. They named themselves after Rinoa Heartilly, a character from the video game Final Fantasy VIII.

On 27 January 2008, they announced they had signed to Eyes of Sound Records.

The band released their self-titled EP, Rinoa, in 2008.

On 21 and 22 June 2008, they supported *Shells on their UK headline tour.

They released a split EP with Bossk in 2009. The band performed at Damnation Festival later that same year. Their debut full-length, An Age Among Them, was released in 2010 to positive reviews, including being named one of the best albums of 2010 by Rock Sound.

In October 2010 Rinoa announced their intention to split at the end of their headline UK tour. Before the tour began, they released the single "Sol Winds". They played their last ever show in Bristol in November.

Following their split James May joined dubstep group Tek-One, and Jozef Norocky joined London band Devil Sold His Soul, with Matthew Holden and David Gumbleton joining a new supergroup called Ancients. Other members went on to form Ancients and Hospitals.

== Musical style ==
Critics have categorised Rinoa's music as screamo, post-metal and post-rock. Alongside Hands, Devil Sold His Soul and Trenches, they fronted a late 2000s wave of bands merging elements of metalcore and post-metal.

Their music was raw amd emotional while also incorporating cinematic and atmospheric elements.

They cited influences including Hopesfall and Envy.

RockFreaks credited Rinoa as "redefin[ing] the expanse of music" in the United Kingdom in the 2000s. They were cited as an influence by Acres.

== Band members ==
- Perry Bryan - vocals
- Matthew Holden - guitar
- David Gumbleton - bass guitar
- Jozef Norocky - guitar
- James May - drums

== Discography ==
=== Studio albums ===
- An Age Among Them (2010)

=== EPs ===
- Rinoa (EP) (2008)

=== Splits ===
- Bossk / Rinoa (2009)

=== Singles ===
- "Sol Winds" (2010)
