= Audio Noir =

Studio album by Bossk
- Released: 1 April 2016
- Recorded: In Lieu of a Studio in Battle, East Sussex, England, UK
- Genres: Post-metal, sludge metal, stoner rock
- Length: 45:11
- Label: Deathwish Inc.
- Producer: Martin Ruffin

Bossk chronology
.2 (2007)	Audio Noir (2016)

Singles from Audio Noir
- 1. "Kobe" Released: 8 February 2016

Audio Noir is the debut studio album by the English heavy metal band Bossk. It was recorded by Martin Ruffin at In Lieu of a Studio in Battle, East Sussex, and released via Deathwish Inc. on 1 April 2016.

== Background ==
Audio Noir was recorded, engineered, mixed and produced at In Lieu Of A Studio in Battle, East Sussex by Martin Ruffin in the summer of 2015 and completed in September 2015. Premier single "Kobe" debuted on BBC's Rock Show with Daniel P. Carter and was made available for streaming on 8 February 2016. The same day the track listing and title, Audio Noir was announced and set to be released on 1 April 2016 via Deathwish Records. Four days later the video for "Kobe" premiered via Nerdist along with the album art work. On the day of release, the full album was streamed via BandCamp. In a press release with Terrorizer, remarking on the writing process, the band stated:

We'd like to think a lot of what we write is unusual. We want people to go on a journey with it. It's written as one continuous piece of music, with every song flowing into the next. The end of the album also flows directly into the start of the first song. As if an endless loop. We recorded it in chunks, one instient [sic] at a time till each layer was finished in a barn with our friend [Martin Ruffin], who was a huge influence and help on the making the sound of the album. The mixing process took a lot longer than we expected with the length of the songs and how different every song was. It's hard to make 8 songs sound the same and completely different all at the same time. We've always collectively show a big interest in space, and science fiction, our previous records artwork had either a very nature based theme, or a very human theme to them. With this album Seldon Hunt helped us create the space side to our imaginations, and once again nailed the main design elements first time. As he has done on every project with us. Having him involved in this has been a huge part in the final product.

== Reception ==
Professional ratings
Review scores
Source	Rating
Dead Rhetoric	8/10
The Monolith	Positive
Music&Riots	8/10
New Noise Magazine	4/5 stars
NO CLEAN SINGING	Positive

Upon release, Audio Noir was mostly well received and garnered largely positive reviews by fans and critics alike. Wil Cifer of No Clean Singing described that album as a "[refusal] to compose in a formulaic manner" with an "urgent sense of motion". Cifer describes the vocals as "buried in the wall of guitars they slam you into" clarifying "the anger here becomes very tangible" at times. In summation he states, "If the run-of-the-mill post-metal bands leave you wanting more than their minimalism allows, and sludge feels like cavemen screaming at you, then these guys have found you the perfect middle ground." Simon of The Monolith gave the album a positive review stating that the album's "songs lurch from delicate, spacious and dreamy post-rock to portentous, doom-drenched, heavy riffing – often in a heartbeat.", commenting that Bossk "mean business. Serious, gorgeous business."

== Track listing ==
No.	Title	Length
1.	"The Reverie"	5:20
2.	"Heliopause"	3:44
3.	"Relancer"	7:44
4.	"Kobe"	7:00
5.	"Atom Smasher"	8:33
6.	"Nadir"	2:31
7.	"The Reverie II"	10:19
Total length:		45:11

== Personnel ==
Bossk

- Sam Marsh – vocals
- Rob Vaughan – guitar
- Alex Hamilton – guitars
- Tom Begley – bass guitar
- Nick Corney – drums, samples

Production

- Seldon Hunt – artwork
- Martin Ruffin – producer, mixer, engineer
