= Hellripper =

Music project by James McBain

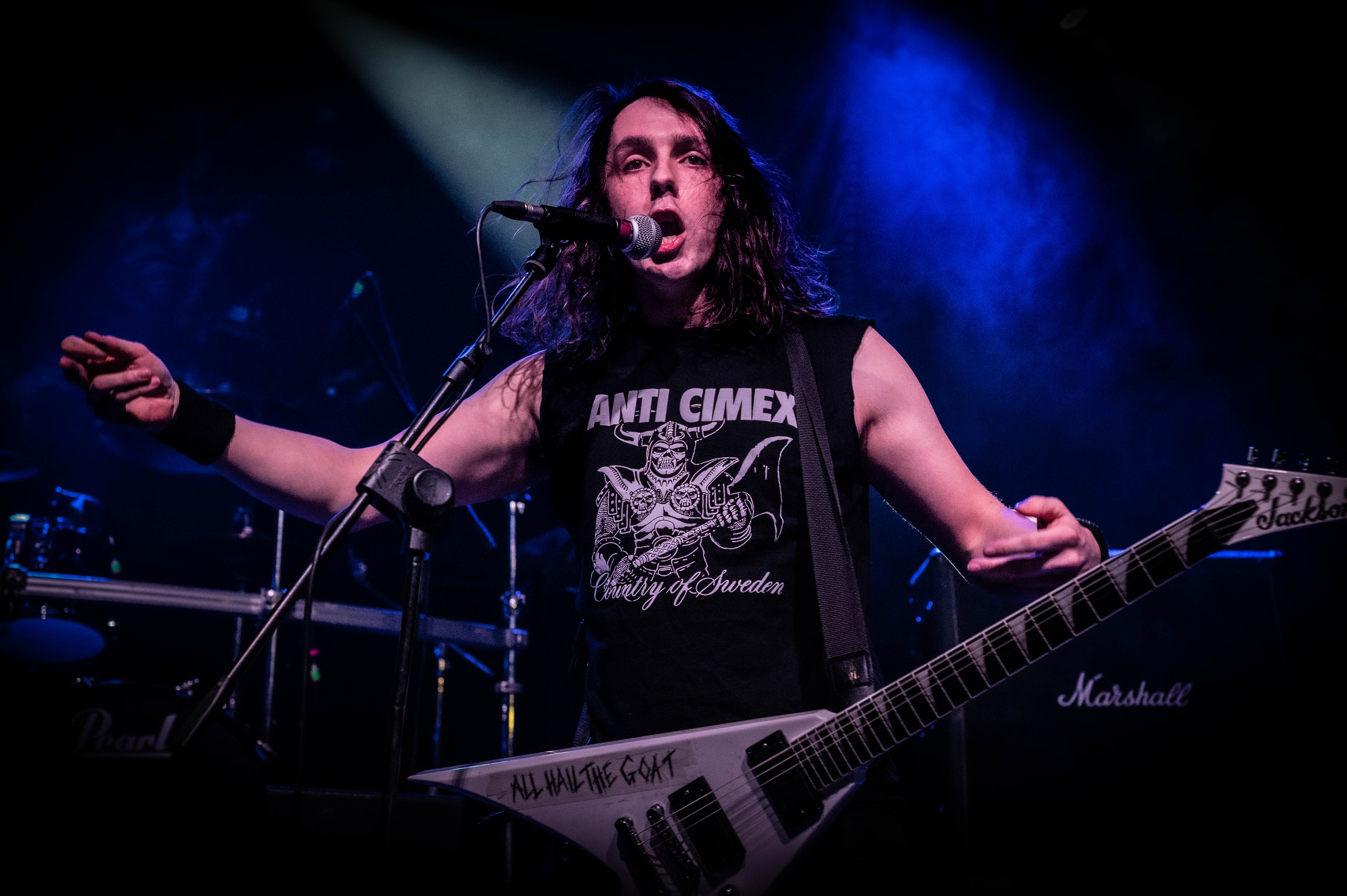
- James McBain performing with Hellripper in 2024

Background information
- Origin: Aberdeen, Scotland
- Genres: Black metal; speed metal
- Years active: 2014–present
- Labels: Reaper Metal; Peaceville
- Members: James McBain
- Website: hellripper.com

Hellripper is a one-man black/speed metal band formed by Scottish musician James McBain in 2014. Cited musical influences include black metal bands such as Venom and Darkthrone, thrash metal bands Megadeth, Metallica and Sabbat, and punk-oriented bands like Motörhead and Anti-Cimex. Lyrically, Hellripper focuses on witchcraft, Occult, and Satanic themes, sometimes drawing from historical events, eg. the possession of Anneliese Michel, as in the song "Anneliese", or the Affair of the Poisons in the song of the same name.

== Career ==
Hellripper was formed by McBain in 2014 and released the extended play The Manifestation of Evil shortly afterwards. They released a 16-minute split album with Philadelphia artist Batsheva in 2015.

In 2017, they released the full-length album Coagulating Darkness through Barbarian Wrath. According to McBain, it was recorded at his house, and his parents were among the guest vocalists on the album. In an interview, he stated that he "focused on incorporating a lot more of a speed/thrash sound into the mix." It was promoted primarily on social media platforms. Metal Hammer praised the album, labelling Hellripper as "Scotland's king of the arcane mosh" and writing that the songs "stab and slash like newly minted classics beamed in from the mid-80s underground, but laden with contemporary oomph". Kim Kelly, writing for Vice, wrote that Coagulating Darkness "feels as much a homage as it does an original creation", and called it "bloody good black/speed metal".

2018 saw several releases alongside other artists including Barbatos, Nightrider, and Dulvel. They also appeared on the Worldwide Organization of Metalheads Against Nazis II compilation, alongside other metal bands such as Ghoul, Jucifer, and Immortal Bird.

The EP Black Arts & Alchemy was released on 5 April 2019. McBain stated in an interview that the album's four songs were "more punk-influenced" compared to Coagulating Darkness, and that Joel Grind of Toxic Holocaust helped with the mastering. In a review for the heavy metal magazine Decibel, Vince Bellino wrote that the extended play contained "some of Hellripper"s best songs yet".

Hellripper's second full-length album, The Affair of the Poisons, was released on 9 October 2020 through Peaceville Records. The album was inspired by the identically titled Affair of the Poisons, a murder scandal in France during the reign of Louis XIV that involved allegations of poisoning and witchcraft. In an interview, McBain described his intention behind the album: "For this album, the primary goal was just to write eight good songs. I wanted fast songs with good riffs, catchy choruses, and plenty of guitar solos."

The Affair of the Poisons was well-received by critics. Nick Ruskell, writing for Kerrang!, gave the album 4 out of 5 stars and praised the energetic tempo of the songs, calling it "a speedy, Satanic delight that exhumes the corpse of early-'80s thrash and black metal". Dean Brown of The Quietus similarly said that the album was "all about manic energy and forbidden enticement", and Dom Lawson of Louder Sound called it "one of the most unrelentingly balls-out metal albums of the year". Indie88 named it to a list of the best metal albums of 2020, writing that it was "an unrelenting, heart-palpitating experience from front to back".

Warlocks Grim & Withered Hags, Hellripper's third full-length album, was released through Peaceville Records on 17 February 2023. McBain stated in an interview that the central theme of the album was the dark side of Scottish folklore, which is shown in songs like The Nuckelavee (based on the Orcadian legend of the same name) and the album's title track which takes its name from a Robert Burns poem. Warlocks Grim & Withered Hags gained positive reviews and debuted at 11th place on the UK Official Rock & Metal Album Charts.

In January 2026, Hellripper released a new single, "Hunderprest" from the forthcoming fourth album, Coronach, set for release on 27 March. The album was released to positive reviews.

== Live performances ==
Hellripper began performing live shows in 2016, has done several European tours, and performed at music festivals such as Metaldays and Roadburn Festival. When performing live, Hellripper performs with additional musicians.

=== Live members ===
- Andy Milburn – bass (2024–present)
- Jackal Batcharj – guitar (2026-present)
- Max Southall – drums (2018–present)

=== Past members ===
- Joseph Quinlan - Guitar (2017-2026)
- David Clark – bass (2016–2024)
- Mark Lerche – guitar (2016–2017)
- Peter Barron – bass (2017–2018)
- Calum Carruthers – drums (2016–2017)
- Ross Findlay – drums (2017–2018)

== Discography ==
=== Albums ===
- Coagulating Darkness (2017)
- The Affair of the Poisons (2020)
- Warlocks Grim & Withered Hags (2023)
- Coronach (2026)

=== Extended plays & compilations ===
- The Manifestation of Evil EP (2015)
- Complete and Total Fucking Mayhem (2016) (compilation)
- Black Arts & Alchemy EP (2019)

=== Splits with other artists ===
- Split with Batsheva (2015)
- Split with Acid Cross and Kriegg (2015)
- Prophecies of Ruin Split with Fetid Zombie (2016)
- Speed Motorized Bastards split with Nightrider, Dulvel and Wastëland Riders (2018)
- Split with Barbatos (2018)
