= Villagers of Ioannina City =

Background information
- Origin: Ioannina, Greece
- Genres: Folk rock, experimental rock, stoner rock, psychedelic rock
- Years active: 2007–present
- Labels: Mantra Records, Napalm Records

Villagers of Ioannina City (VIC) is a folk rock band from Ioannina, Greece, formed in 2007. They play post, stoner and psychedelic rock with a large dose of Greek folk music from the region of Epirus. The regional musical tradition is characterized by polyphony, specific rhythms and tunes, and the use of clarinet, kaval, and bagpipe. The band fuses this unique folk music with modern psychedelic forms, creating a sound where the dominant solo instrument is the clarinet. They have played in the biggest rock festivals and in numerous sold-out shows in the biggest music scenes in Greece.

== Current members ==
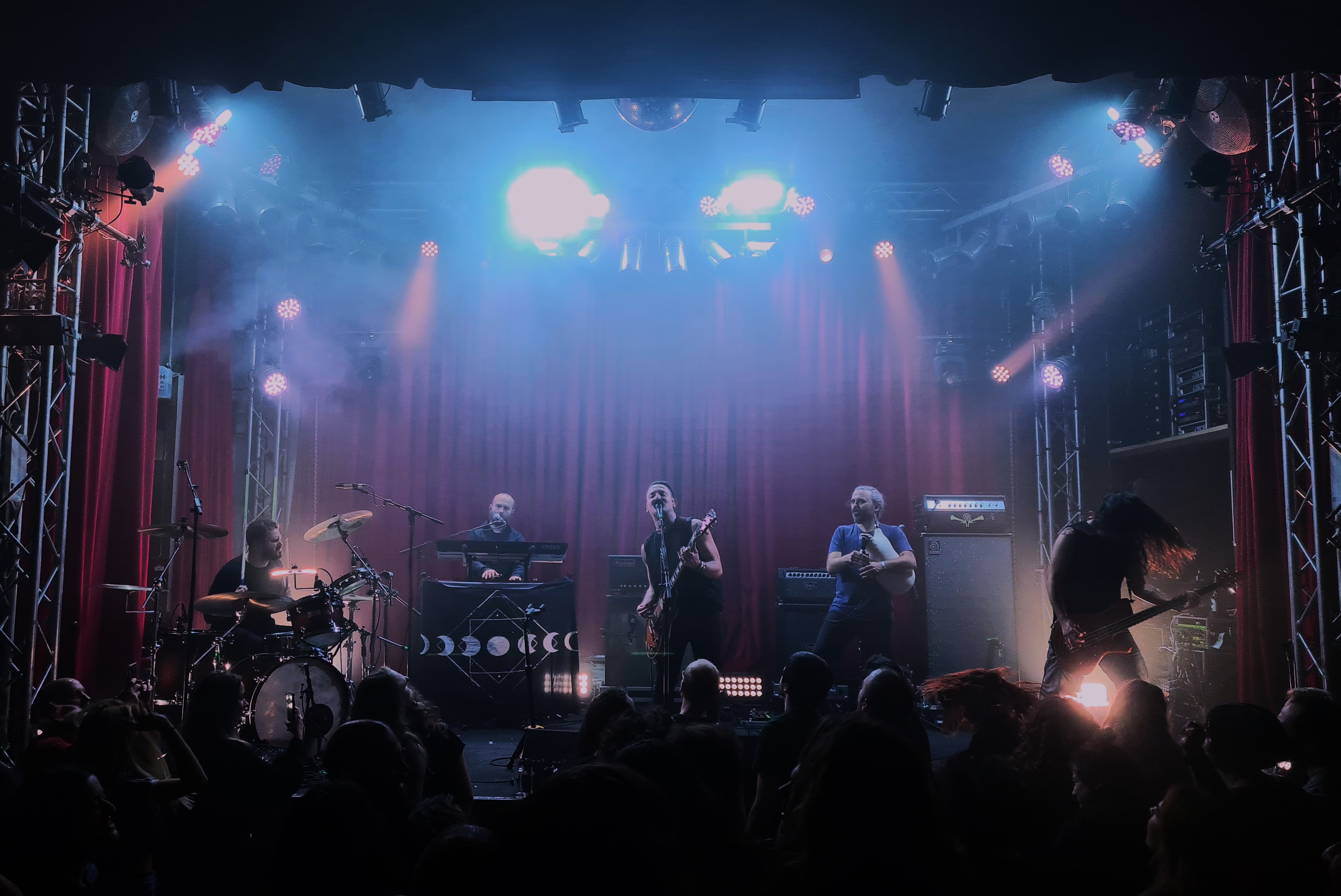
Villagers of Ioannina City performing in Berlin, November 2022

- Alex Karametis – guitar, vocals, synth
- Akis Zois – bass
- Aris Giannopoulos – drums
- Dimitris Brendas – bagpipe, winds

== Additional musicians over the years ==
- Giannis Haldoupis – clarinet
- Konstantis Pistiolis – clarinet, kaval, backing vocals
- Kostas Zois – guitar
- Chrysa Tsolaki – backing vocals
- Sofia Kamina – backing vocals
- Anthie Kirkou – backing vocals
- Kostas Lazos – bagpipe, winds
- Achilleas Radis – keyboards
- Kostas Livas – guitar

== Discography ==
- Promo 2010, April 2010, self-released
- Riza ('root' in Greek), April 2014, Mantra Records
- Zvara/Karakolia EP, November 2014, Mantra Records
- Age of Aquarius, September 2019, Mantra Records
- Through Space & Time – Alive In Athens 2020, March 2023, Napalm Records
- Venceremos, September 2026, Napalm Records

== Sources ==
- 2020 Album Review – Blabbermouth
- 2020 Album Review – Metal Temple
- Metal Storm
- 2020 Album Review – Metal Hammer
