= Empire of Light (album) =

Studio album by Devil Sold His Soul
- Released: 17 September 2012
- Genres: Post-hardcore, post-metal
- Length: 58:41
- Label: Small Town Records
- Producers: Jonny Renshaw & Devil Sold His Soul

Devil Sold His Soul chronology
Blessed & Cursed (2010)	Empire of Light (2012)	Belong ╪ Betray (2014)

Empire of Light is the third full-length album by the English metal group Devil Sold His Soul, released by Small Town Records on 17 September 2012. It was the first studio album to feature Jozef Norocky on bass, and the last to feature Ed Gibbs as lead vocalist until Loss, prior to his departure from the band in April 2013 and rejoining in 2017.

== Reception ==
Professional ratings
Review scores
Source	Rating
Rockfreaks.net	9/10

The BBC's Raziq Rauf thought it continued the band's previous quality. Ben Tipple, of Punktastic, felt that "the increase in atmospheric soundscapes serve to enhance the overall experience without stepping too far out of the band’s norm".

== Track listing ==
No.	Title	Length
1.	"No Remorse, No Regrets"	4:52
2.	"A New Legacy"	3:39
3.	"VIII"	3:22
4.	"It Rains Down"	4:22
5.	"The Waves and the Seas"	5:51
6.	"Sorrow Plagues"	4:55
7.	"Time and Pressure"	5:00
8.	"Salvation Lies Within"	4:08
9.	"Crusader"	7:13
10.	"The Verge"	6:00
11.	"End of Days"	9:25
Total length:		58:41

== Personnel ==
Devil Sold His Soul

- Edward Gibbs – vocals
- Jozef Norocky – Bass guitar
- Paul Kitney – samples
- Leks Wood – drums
- Jonny Renshaw – Guitar
- Rick Chapple – Guitar/Piano/Organ

Additional Musicians

- Group Vocals by Tommy Renshaw and Devil Sold His Soul

== Production ==
- Produced by Jonny Renshaw and Devil Sold His Soul
- Recorded, Engineered and Mixed by Jonny Renshaw
- Mastered by Alan Douches
