= Warning (British band) =

British doom metal band

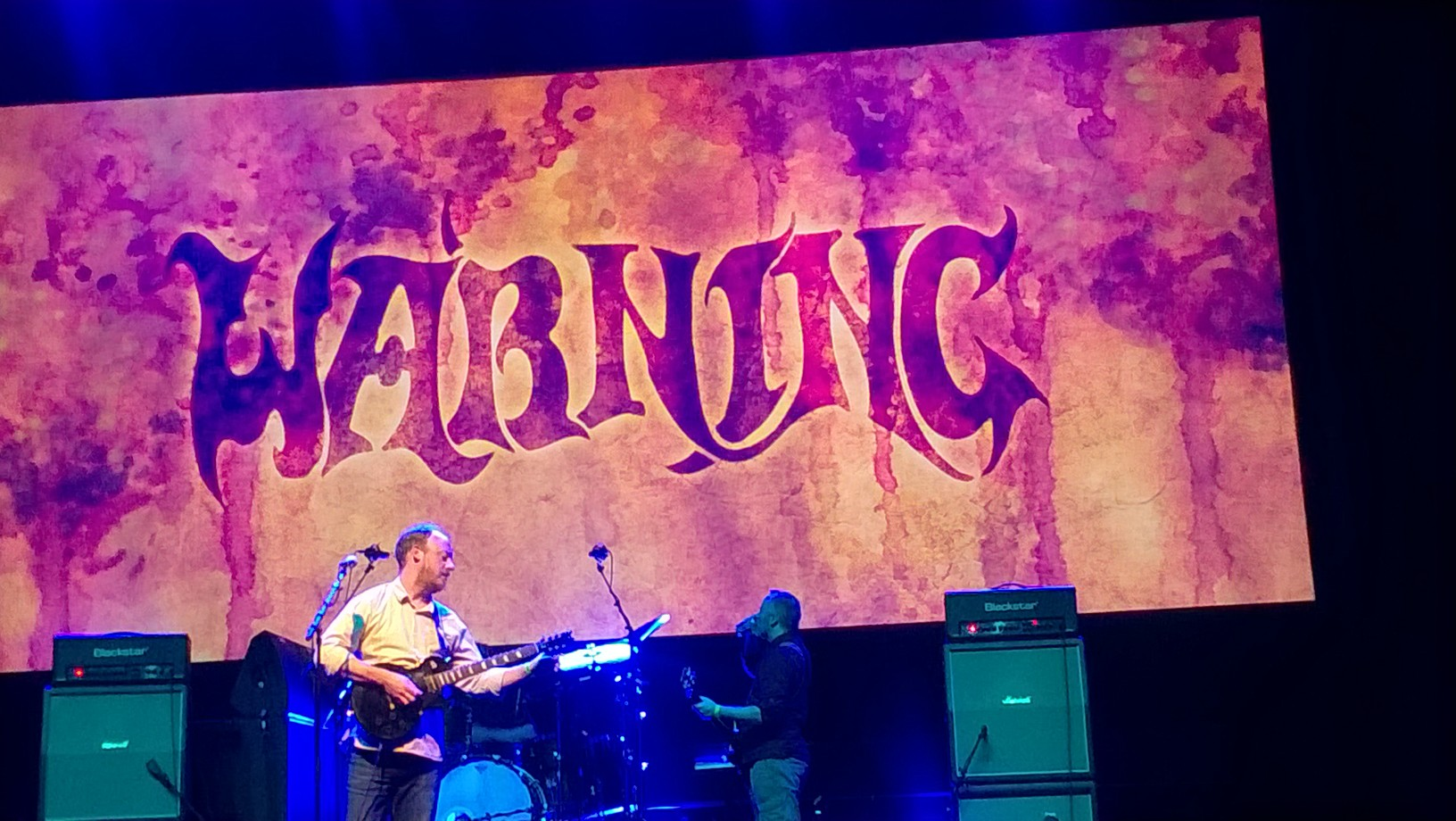
- Warning at 2017 Roadburn Festival

Background information
- Origin: Harlow, England
- Genre: Doom metal
- Years active: 1994–2001, 2005–2009, 2017–2018, 2025–present
- Labels: Relapse Records (current); Svart Records; The Miskatonic Foundation; Cyclone Empire
- Spinoffs: 40 Watt Sun
- Members: Patrick Walker; Marcus Hatfield; Wayne Taylor; Andrew Prestidge
- Past members: Stuart Springthorpe; John Sellings; Christian Leitch
- Website: www.warningband.com

Warning is a British doom metal band founded in Harlow, Essex, in 1994, by vocalist, guitarist and songwriter Patrick Walker, and is regarded as highly influential on the doom metal sound.

Following the band's breakup in 2009, Walker founded the band 40 Watt Sun, with whom he continues to release music.

In 2025, the band officially reunited, signing with Relapse Records and announcing their first studio album in two decades.

== History ==
=== Formation and early years (1994–1999) ===
Warning was formed by Patrick Walker alongside bassist John Sellings and drummer Stuart Springthorpe. After recording the demo releases Revelation Looms (1996) and Blessed by the Sabbath (1997), the band attracted attention within the underground doom metal scene and secured early label interest.

=== The Strength to Dream and disbanding (1999–2001) ===
The band's debut album, The Strength to Dream, was released in 1999 through the Miskatonic Foundation and established Warning within the doom metal underground, developing a cult following. Despite the album's reception, the band disbanded shortly after completing a European tour with fellow doom metal band Jack Frost in 2001. Warning later reunited in 2005 for a performance at the Doom Shall Rise III festival in Göppingen, Germany.

=== Reunion and Watching from a Distance (2005–2009) ===
In early 2006, following a Scandinavian tour with Reverend Bizarre, Warning entered Rosenquarz Studio in Lübeck, Germany, to record their second album, Watching from a Distance. The album was released later that year to widespread critical acclaim and has since been cited as a significant release within the doom metal genre, frequently appearing in retrospective lists of influential albums of the 2000s, and among the high water marks of the genre.

=== Hiatus and 40 Watt Sun (2009–2025) ===
Warning officially disbanded in January 2009. Walker stated "in order to make music that retains some semblance of integrity and wholeness, I realize I need to move on." He subsequently continued recording under the name 40 Watt Sun, initially as a band and later as a solo project, releasing four studio albums over the following years to widespread critical acclaim.

Warning reunited in 2017 to perform Watching from a Distance in its entirety at the Roadburn Festival in the Netherlands, followed by a series of live performances across Europe and North America.

=== Second reunion and Rituals of Shame (2025–present) ===
In 2025, the band signed with Relapse Records, and on June 19 2026, released their first studio album in two decades, Rituals of Shame, to widespread critical acclaim. To accompany the release, filmmaker Geert Braekers made a short documentary chronicling the recording of the album. Rituals of Shame reached No. 4 in the UK Independent Album Breakers Chart, No. 14 in the UK Rock & Metal Albums Chart, and No. 32 in the UK Independent Albums Chart on the week of release. Deaf Forever magazine (Germany) called Rituals of Shame " a threee-quarter hour masterpiece", scoring it 9.5/10, while Kerrang! magazine proclaimed it, "another perfect album of pure emotion… Rituals of Shame is nothing short of miraculous," giving the album 5/5. Blabbermouth described the album as "gorgeous and exhilerating", adding "no one else makes music like this."

== Influence and legacy ==
In 2019, Kerrang! ranked Watching from a Distance first on its list of the "13 Bleakest Rock and Metal Albums Ever", writing that "the depths of anguish conjured by Essex-based frontman Patrick Walker... are still utterly unmatched".

Metal Hammer ranked the album's title track first on its list of "The 10 Most Heartbreaking Doom Metal Songs", and later included Warning in its "Top 50 Greatest Cult Bands" feature.

In A History of Heavy Metal, author Andrew O'Neill described Warning as "the best doom band of the bunch", writing that their 2006 release Watching from a Distance contains "possibly the most emotionally affecting song in all of heavy metal", citing the track "Bridges".

== Line-up ==
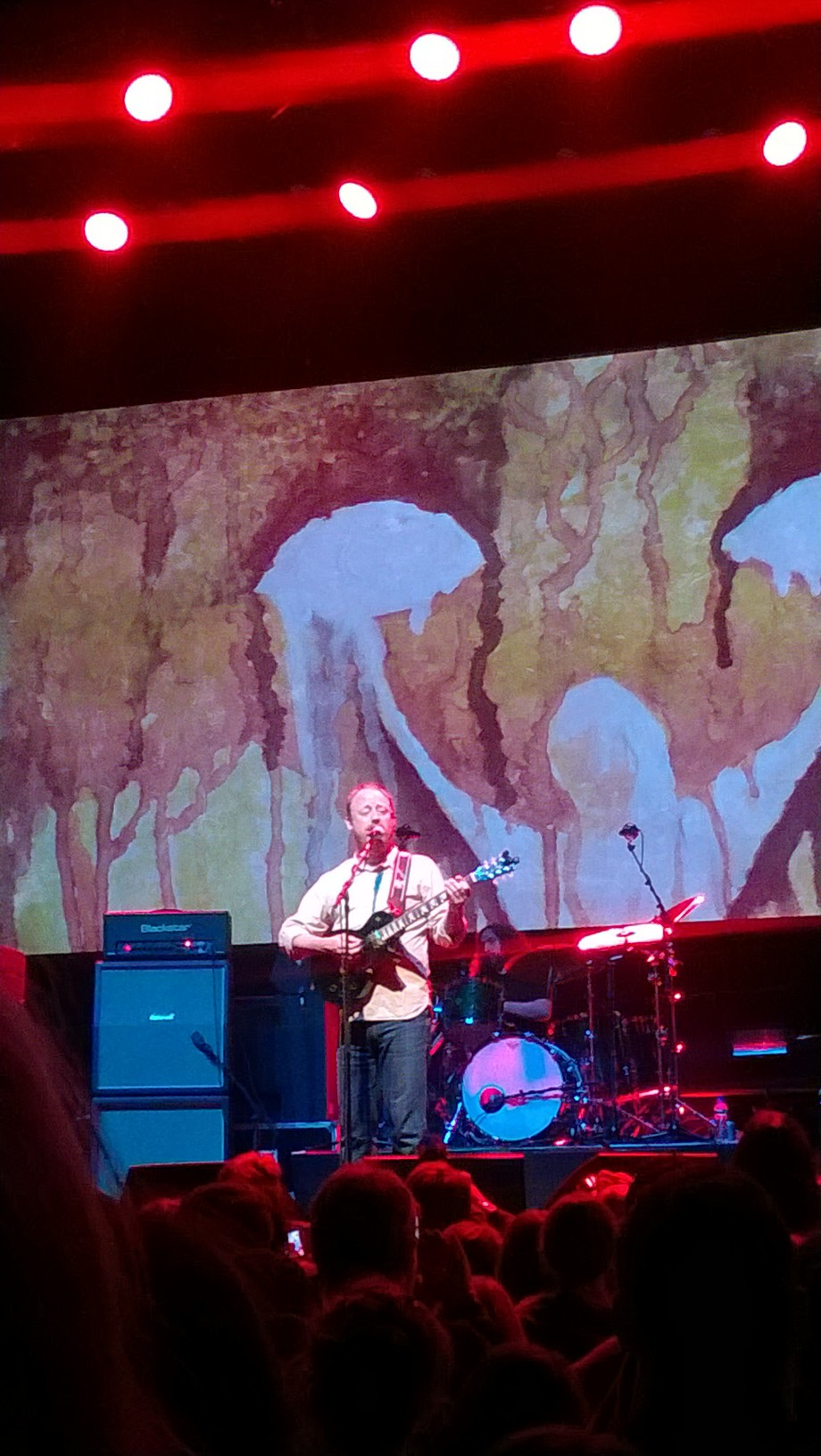
Warning performing in 2017

=== Current members ===
- Patrick Walker – vocals, guitar (1994–present)
- Wayne Taylor – bass (1997–1998), guitar (2016–present)
- Marcus Hatfield – bass (1998–present)
- Andrew Prestidge – drums (2017–present)

=== Former members ===
- John Sellings – bass (1994–1997)
- Stuart Springthorpe – drums (1994–2008)
- Christian Leitch – drums (2008–2017)

== Discography ==
=== Studio albums ===
- The Strength to Dream (1999)
- Watching from a Distance (2006)
- Rituals of Shame (2026)

=== Live albums ===
- Watching from a Distance – Live at Roadburn (2021)

=== Extended plays ===
- Bridges (2010)

=== Demos ===
- Revelation Looms (1996)
- Blessed by the Sabbath (1997)

=== Compilations ===
- The Demo Tapes (2011)
- The Albums (2017)
- Casting Shadows (2019)

=== Compilation appearances ===
- "Cemetery Eyes" on At the Mountains of Madness: International Doom Collection (1999)
