= October File (band) =

- Origin: UK
- Genres: Post-punk, heavy metal, industrial metal
- Labels: Candlelight Records
- Members: Ben Hollyer – Vocals; Matt Lerwill – Guitars; Steve Beatty – Bass Guitar; John Watt – Drums

October File were a British post-punk band, named after the die Kreuzen album. Their debut album was released in 2004; subsequent releases followed on the labels Golf Records and Candlelight Records. Their music uses elements of punk, hardcore and industrial metal, often with political overtones. Jaz Coleman of Killing Joke guests on 2007's Holy Armour from the Jaws of God. The group was scheduled to tour with Prong in January 2008 but pulled out due to illness. The band toured in February 2010 with American band Fear Factory and British band Sylosis, followed closely by an appearance at Hammerfest II in Prestatyn, Wales on the second stage. Additionally, the band appeared as themselves in the zombie comedy Zombie Driftwood, set in the Caymen Isles. The movie soundtrack comprises a selection of heavy metal songs and includes the tracks Falter and Isolation by October File.

The band called it quits on 6 October 2016

== Discography ==
- A Long Walk on a Short Pier (Abstract Sounds, 2004)
- How to Lose Friends and Alienate People EP (Golf Records, 2004)
- Monuments EP(Golf Records, 2005)
- Hallowed By Thy Army EP (Candlelight Records, 2006)
- Holy Armour from the Jaws of God (Candlelight Records, 2007)
- Our Souls to You (Candlelight Records, 2010)
- The Application of Loneliness, Ignorance, Misery, Love and Despair – An Introspective of the Human Condition (Candlelight Records, 2014)
