= Devil Sold His Soul =

British post-hardcore band

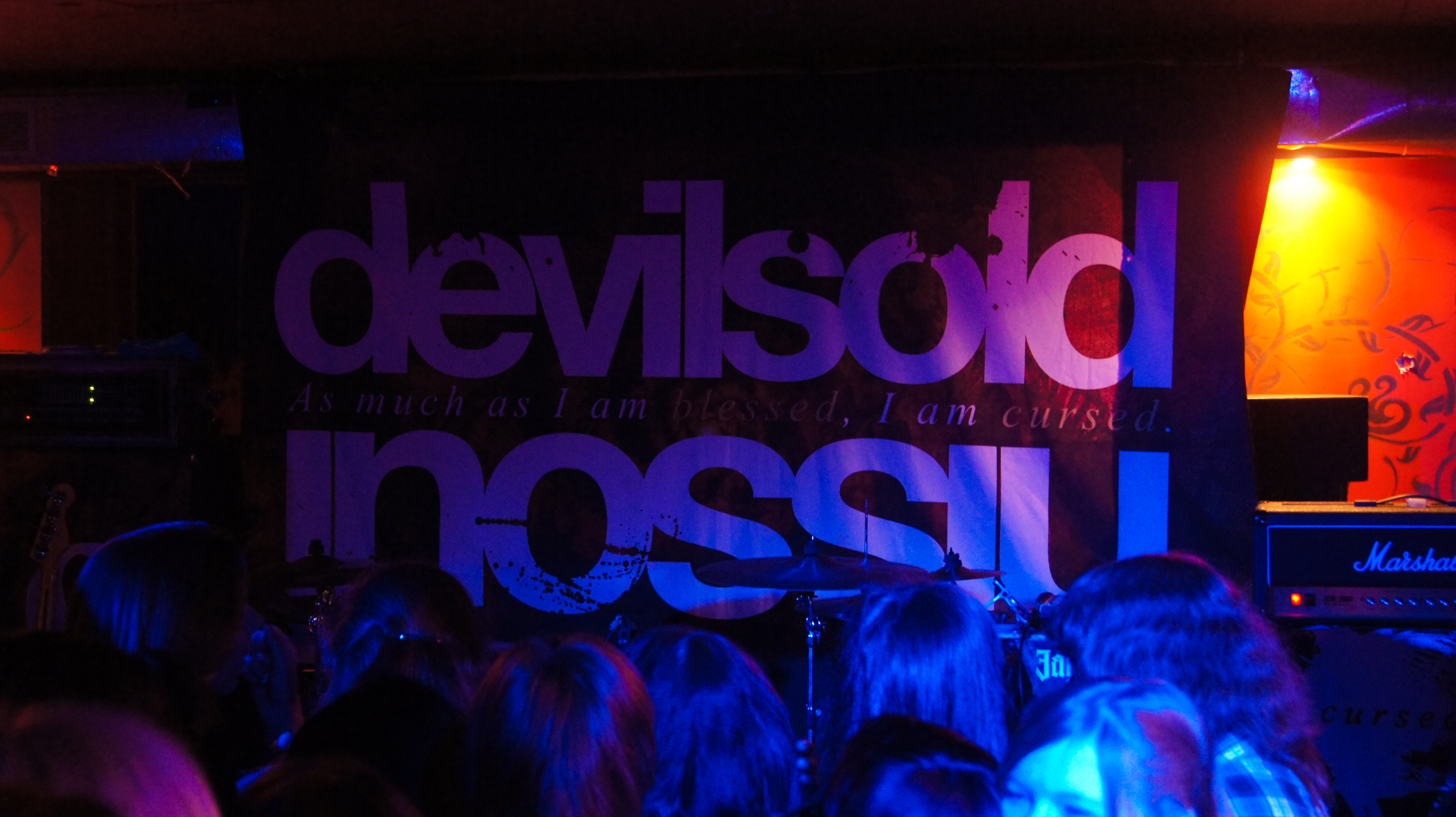
- Devil Sold His Soul

Background information
- Origin: London, England
- Genres: Post-hardcore, post-metal, metalcore
- Years active: 2004–present
- Labels: Eyesofsound, Century Media, Basick, Nuclear Blast
- Spinoff of: Mahumodo
- Members: Rick Chapple; Jonny Renshaw; Ed Gibbs; Leks Wood; Jozef Norocky; Paul Green
- Past members: Tom Harriman; Dave Robinson; Iain Trotter; Paul Kitney
- Website: devilsoldhissoul.com

Devil Sold His Soul are an ambient influenced post-hardcore band from London, formed in 2004 and signed to Nuclear Blast.

== History ==
With three former members of Mahumodo, Devil Sold His Soul formed in 2004. They released their debut studio album A Fragile Hope on 18 June, 2007, after the release of their debut EP Darkness Prevails, The band released their second studio album Blessed & Cursed (mixed by Steve Evetts) on 18 June, 2010. On 8 August, 2010, they played at the Hevy Music Festival held near Folkestone, Kent, before embarking on a UK tour with Architects. In January, 2011, the band announced that bassist Iain Trotter has left the band to pursue a career outside music. He was replaced by Jozef Norocky, former guitarist of Rinoa. In mid-March, 2013, Ed Gibbs announced that he would be leaving the band to also pursue a career outside the band after the upcoming music festivals were over. In April, Paul Green, one of the two vocalists of The Arusha Accord, replaced him as the band's vocalist. Devil Sold His Soul signed a deal with Basick at the end of 2013, coinciding with the release of a music video for their single "Time".

On 23 January, 2017, the band announced they will be playing their debut album A Fragile Hope in full on their upcoming tour and also the return of ‘Master’ Ed Gibbs on vocals alongside current vocalist Paul Green. After touring the UK and Japan in late 2017 and Spring 2018, the band began work on their upcoming 4th studio album titled Loss. Loss, which was released on 9 April, 2021, via Nuclear Blast Records, is the first studio album to feature the dual vocalists Ed Gibbs and Paul Green.

== Musical style and influences ==
Critics have categorised Devil Sold His Soul's music as post-hardcore, post-metal and metalcore They have cited influences including Deftones, Poison the Well, Will Haven, Envy, Underoath, the Dillinger Escape Plan, Norma Jean, Tool, Slipknot, Korn, Rage Against the Machine, Creed, Killswitch Engage, Meshuggah, the Hope Conspiracy and Cold Funeral.

== Members ==
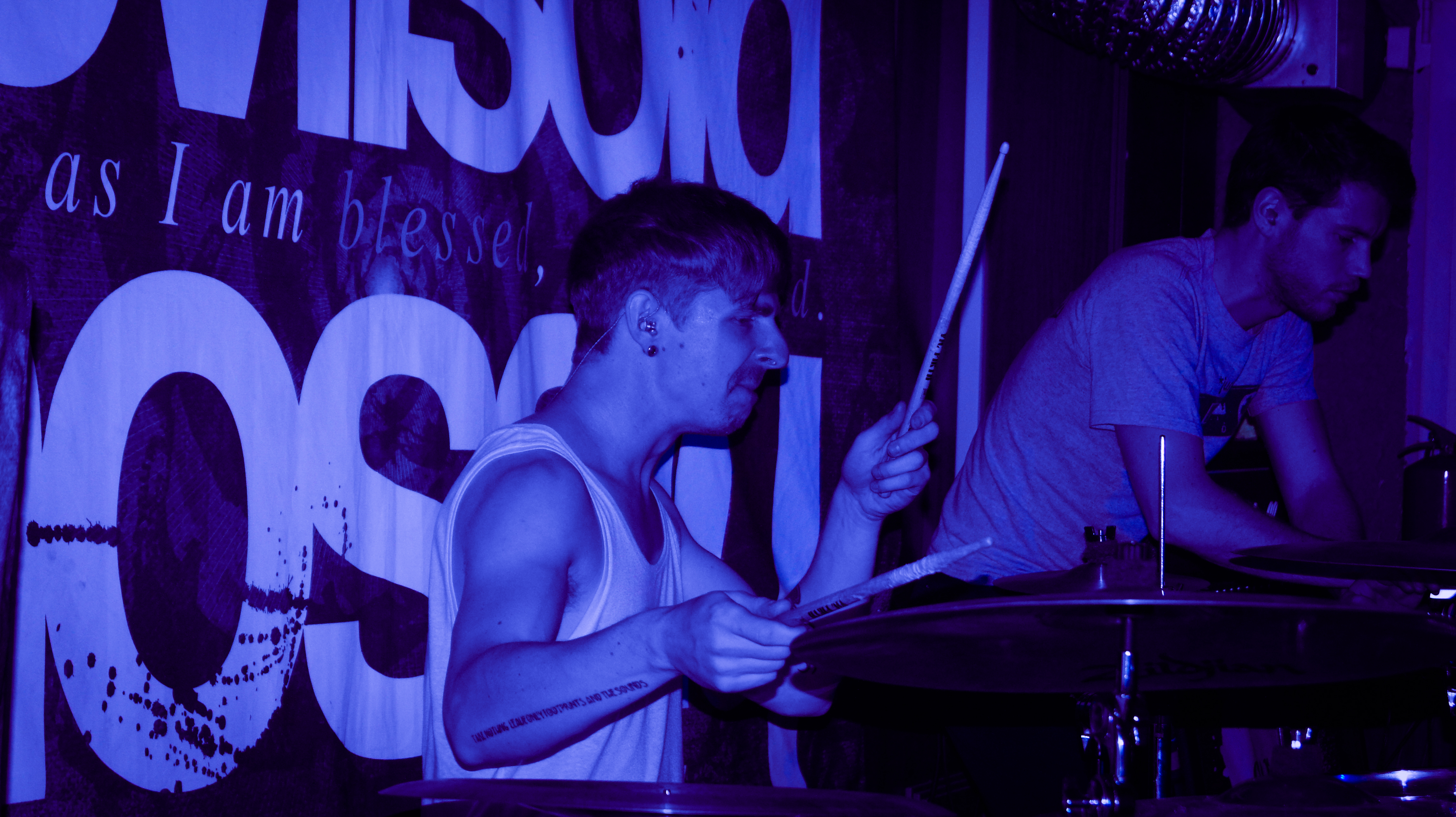
Alex "Leks" Wood

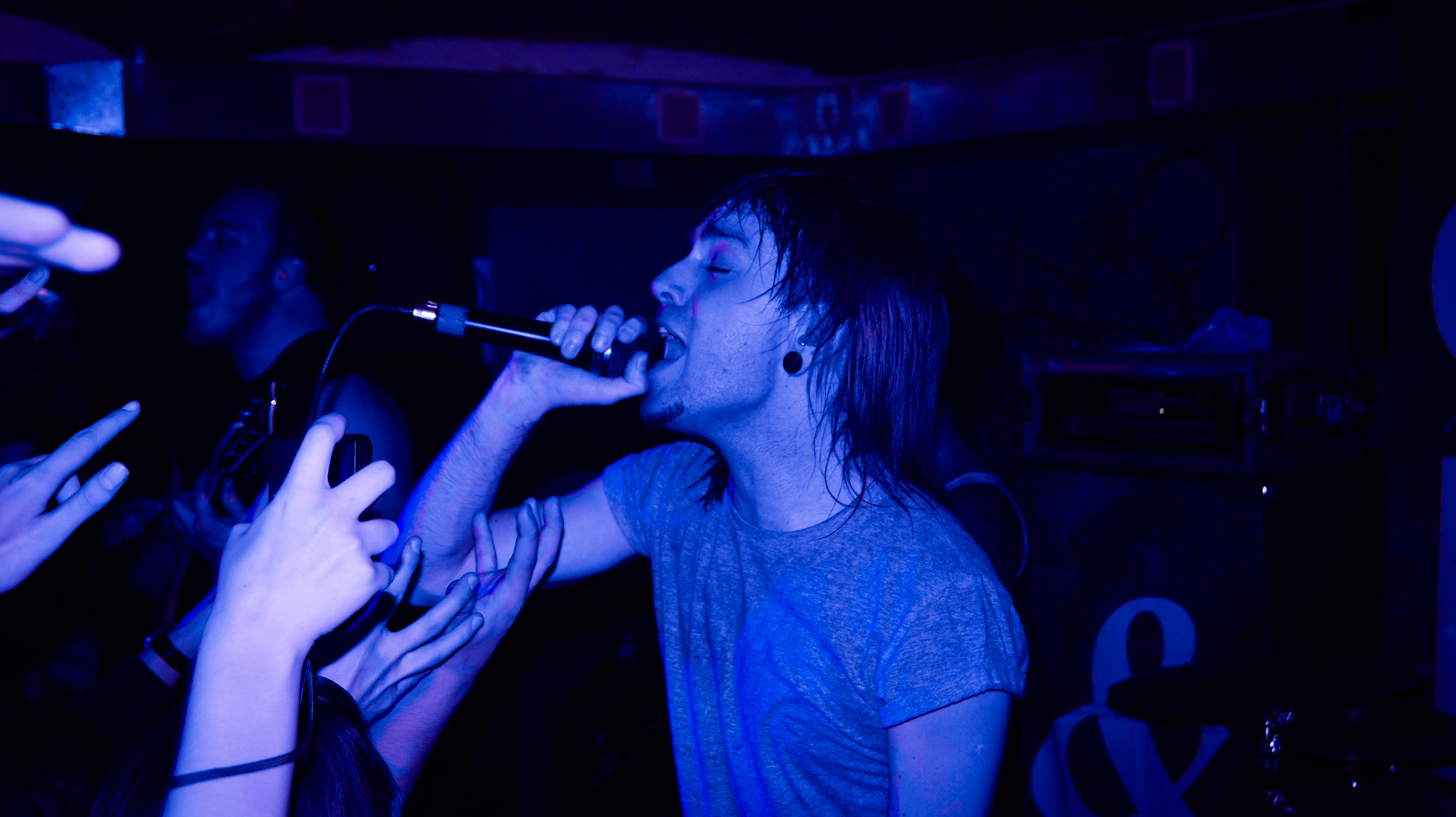
Ed Gibbs

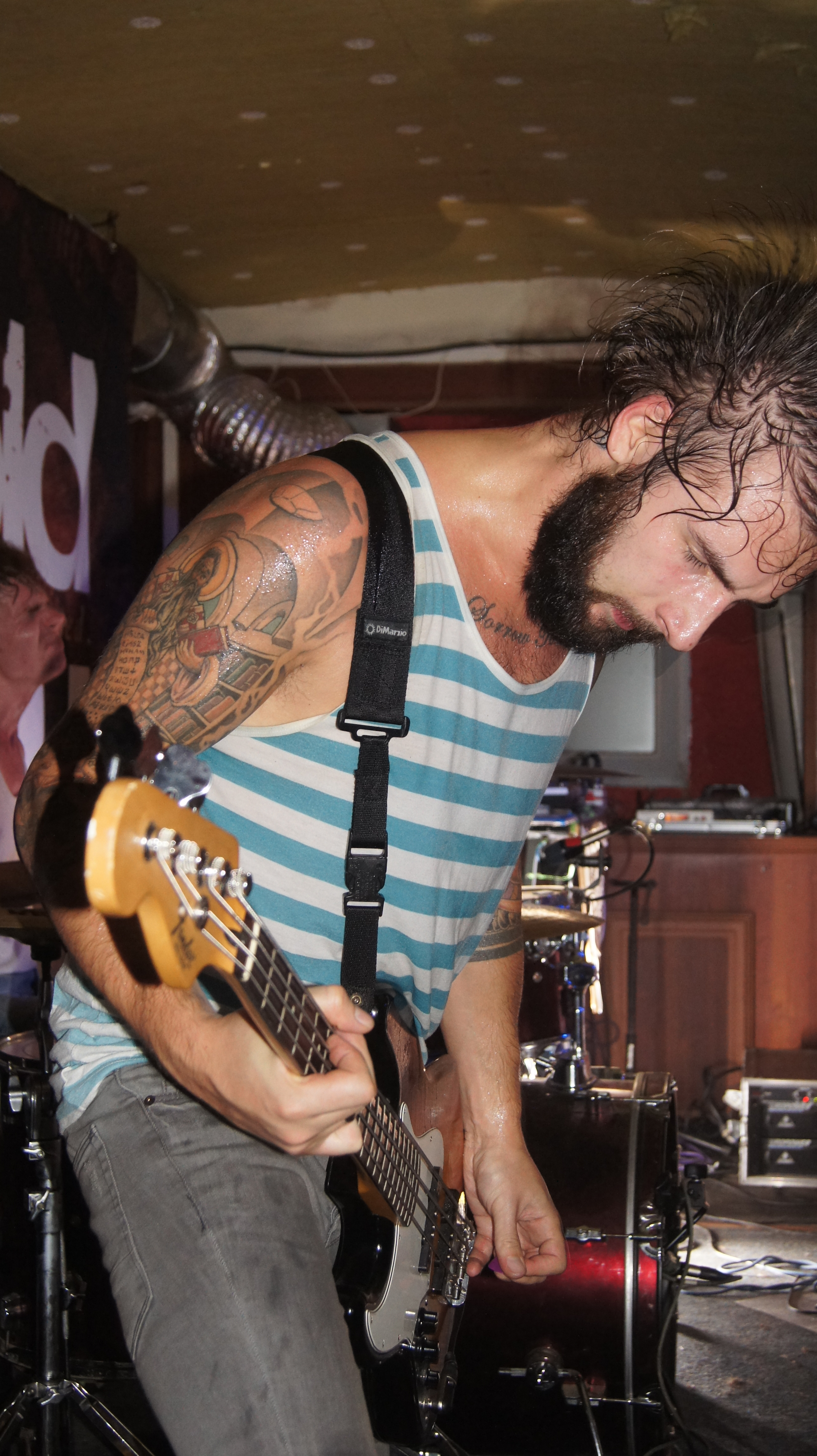
Jozef Norocky

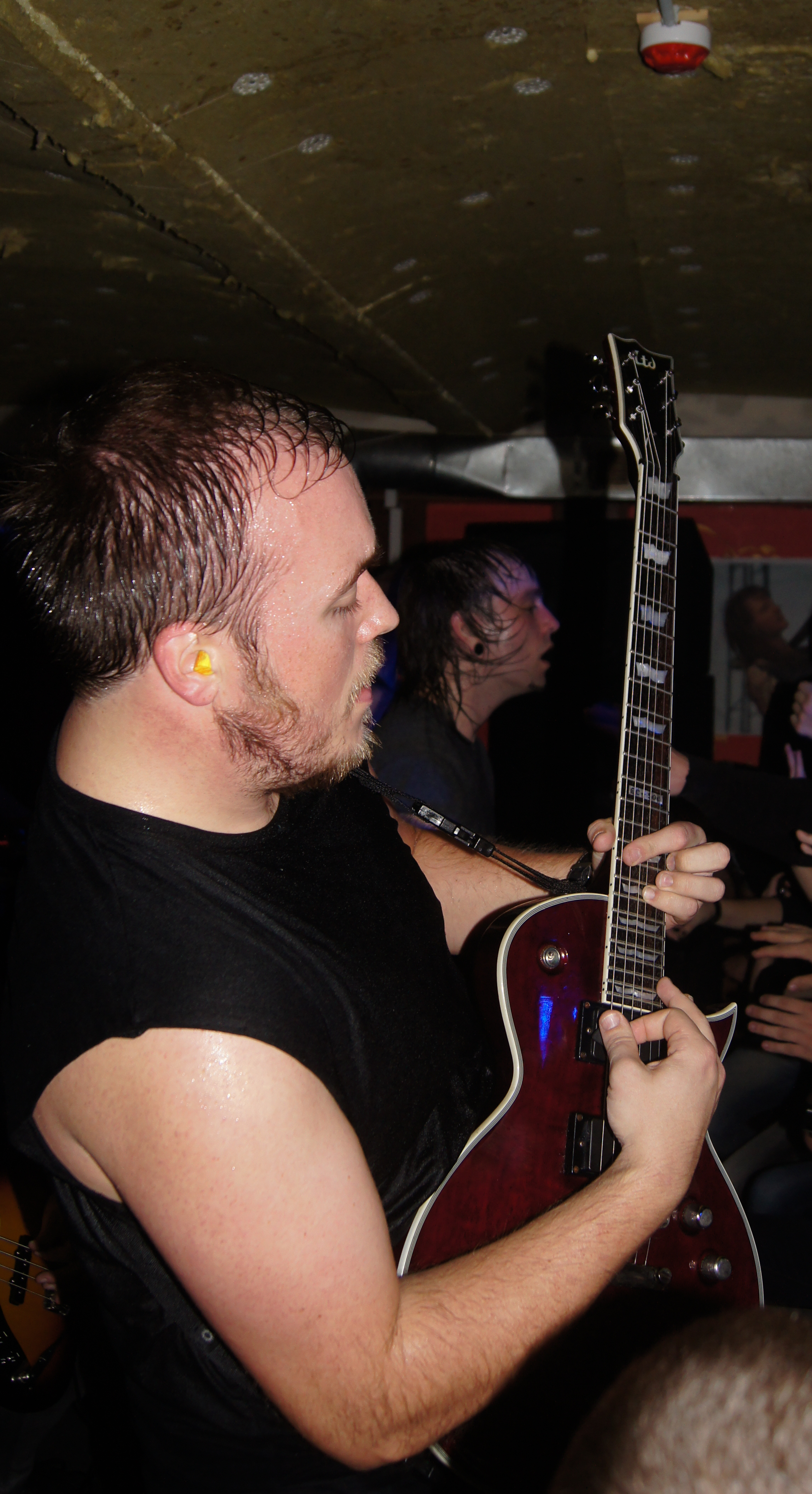
Richard Chapple

Current

- Richard Chapple – guitar (2004–present), samples (2020-present)
- Jonny Renshaw – guitar (2004–present)
- Ed Gibbs – vocals (2004–2013, 2017–present)
- Alex "Leks" Wood – drums (2007–present)
- Jozef Norocky – bass guitar (2011–present)
- Paul Green – vocals (2013–present)

Past

- Tom Harriman – drums (2004–2006)
- Dave Robinson – drums (2006–2007)
- Iain Trotter – bass guitar (2004–2011)
- Paul Kitney – samples (2004–2020)

== Discography ==
=== Studio albums ===
- A Fragile Hope (18 June 2007)
- Blessed & Cursed (12 July 2010)
- Empire of Light (17 September 2012)
- Loss (9 April 2021)

=== EPs ===
- Darkness Prevails (2005)
- Belong ╪ Betray (2014)

=== Splits ===
- Devil Sold His Soul/Tortuga (2008)
