= 2007 in heavy metal music =

This is a timeline documenting the events of heavy metal in the year 2007.

== Newly formed bands ==
- Acid Witch
- Affiance
- Animals as Leaders
- Archspire
- The Atlas Moth
- Attack Attack!
- Barren Earth
- Benevolent
- Black Anvil
- Burn Halo
- Cavalera Conspiracy
- Chelsea Grin
- Coldrain
- The Contortionist
- Cormorant
- The Crimson Armada
- Cross Vein
- Dust Bolt
- Fallujah
- Fleshgod Apocalypse
- Haken
- Hands
- Hooded Menace
- Imperial Circus Dead Decadence
- Iwrestledabearonce
- Krallice
- Kraptor
- Kvelertak
- KYPCK
- Monuments
- Neurotech
- The Night Flight Orchestra
- Northern Kings
- Oranssi Pazuzu
- Panopticon
- Santa Cruz
- Savage Messiah
- Skin
- Striker
- Unleash the Archers
- Versailles
- White Wizzard
- Xerath

== Reformed bands ==
- Artillery
- Carcass
- Crashdïet
- Emperor (for a few shows)
- Extreme
- Rage Against the Machine
- Spinal Tap
- X Japan
- Sacred Reich

== Disbandments ==
- Arcturus
- A Perfect Murder
- The Devin Townsend Band
- I Killed the Prom Queen
- Reverend Bizarre
- Scars of Tomorrow
- Strapping Young Lad
- Send More Paramedics
- Mendeed
- Pungent Stench
- With Passion
- Quiet Riot (reformed in 2010)
- Nodes of Ranvier
- Fall of the Leafe

== Events ==
- Wayne Knupp, original vocalist for Devourment died on September 15.
- Pat Mason of Arsonists Get All The Girls passes away on the morning of November 30, his 21st birthday.
- Extreme reunite for the third time, announcing plans for a world tour next year, as well as a new studio album, which will be their first since 1995's Waiting for the Punchline.
- Led Zeppelin get back together one more time for one concert in London.
- In Sorte Diaboli (Dimmu Borgir) becomes the first extreme metal album ever to hit the No. 1 in a Record chart, achieving that position in Norway.
- Andreas Sydow leaves Darkane, being replaced by Jens Broman.
- Witold Kiełtyka, drummer for Decapitated, is killed in a car crash in October.
- Vocalist, Damo and manager, Andy of The Red Shore, died in December.
- Anette Olzon joins Nightwish as their new lead vocalist.
- Peter Lindgren leaves Opeth.
- Jani Liimatainen is fired from Sonata Arctica.
- Jacob Bredahl leaves Hatesphere.
- Mark St. John, guitarist of Kiss in 1984, dies in April.
- The song Final Six from Slayer won in the Best Metal Performance category at the 50th Grammy Awards.
- Meiju Enho leaves Ensiferum.
- Paul Raven, bassist for Ministry and former Killing Joke bassist, dies in October.
- Kevin DuBrow, lead singer for Quiet Riot, dies in November.
- Matt Barlow returns as lead singer of Iced Earth.
- Ramallah disbands.
- Matte Modin is fired from Dark Funeral, for disrupting their live performance schedule through deceit, according to the band. He is replaced by Nils Fjällström of Aeon, who is given the stage name "Dominator".
- Gaahl and King ov Hell part ways from Gorgoroth founding member Infernus with the intention of using the band's name and assets themselves, igniting the Gorgoroth name dispute.
- Soichiro Umemura, vocalist of Tokyo Yankees, died on December 11.

== Albums released ==
=== January ===
Day	Artist	Album
5	Legion of the Damned	Sons of the Jackal
10	Moonsorrow	Viides Luku - Hävitetty
12	Grave Digger	Liberty Or Death
12	Therion	Gothic Kabbalah
15	Al Atkins	Demon Deceiver
16	Age of Nemesis	Terra Incognita
19	Mnemic	Passenger
22	A Day to Remember	For Those Who Have Heart
22	Destruction	Thrash Anthems
22	Pain of Salvation	Scarsick
22	Rotting Christ	Theogonia
23	Beneath the Sky	What Demons Do to Saints
23	Fear My Thoughts	Vulcanus
26	Metalium	Nothing to Undo – Chapter Six

=== February ===
Day	Artist	Album
6	Car Bomb	Centralia
6	The End	Elementary
6	Impious	Holy Murder Masquerade
7	Dir En Grey	The Marrow of a Bone
7	Swallow the Sun	Hope
12	The Berzerker	Animosity
12	Domine	Ancient Spirit Rising
19	Mendeed	The Dead Live by Love
19	Watain	Sworn to the Dark
20	Aborted	Slaughter & Apparatus: A Methodical Overture
20	Beneath the Massacre	Mechanics of Dysfunction
20	Novembers Doom	The Novella Reservoir
23	Masterplan	MK II
23	Naglfar	Harvest
23	Sirenia	Nine Destinies and a Downfall
26	Charlie Dominici	O3: A Trilogy, Part Two
26	Cirith Gorgor	Cirith Gorgor
26	Manowar	Gods Of War

=== March ===
Day	Artist	Album
1	Buckethead	Pepper's Ghost
3	Arghoslent	Hornets of the Pogrom
5	Onslaught	Killing Peace
5	Saxon	The Inner Sanctum
6	Alabama Thunderpussy	Open Fire
6	Chimaira	Resurrection
6	Emmure	Goodbye to the Gallows
6	Dying Fetus	War of Attrition
6	Megadeth	That One Night: Live in Buenos Aires (CD/DVD) (released on CD September 4, 2007)
6	Sevendust	Alpha
12	Nightrage	A New Disease Is Born
13	Battlelore	Evernight
13	Type O Negative	Dead Again
13	Unsane	Visqueen
14	Naildown	Dreamcrusher
14	Thunderstone	Evolution 4.0
16	Sabaton	Metalizer
19	Morgana Lefay	Aberrations of the Mind
20	Dååth	The Hinderers
20	Haste the Day	Pressure the Hinges
20	In This Moment	Beautiful Tragedy
23	Sun Caged	Artemisia
24	Five Star Prison Cell	Slaves of Virgo
24	The Gathering	A Noise Severe
25	Graveland	Will Stronger Than Death
27	Machine Head	The Blackening
27	Mors Principium Est	Liberation = Termination
28	Finntroll	Ur Jordens Djup
28	Threshold	Dead Reckoning
30	Attila	Fallacy

=== April ===
Day	Artist	Album
1	Abscess	Horrorhammer
1	Kronos	The Hellenic Terror
2	Pro-Pain	Age of Tyranny – The Tenth Crusade
2	Scarve	The Undercurrent
2	Susperia	Cut from Stone
3	All Out War	Assassins In The House Of God
3	The Chariot	The Fiancée
3	Chevelle	Vena Sera
3	Omnium Gatherum	Stuck Here on Snakes Way
3	Shadows Fall	Threads of Life
3	Static-X	Cannibal
3	Virgin Black	Requiem - Mezzo Forte
3	Vital Remains	Icons of Evil
5	Monstrosity	Spiritual Apocalypse
8	Legion	Мифы древности (Myths of Antiquity)
10	Andromeda	Playing Off The Board (DVD)
10	From Autumn to Ashes	Holding a Wolf by the Ears
10	Hellyeah	Hellyeah
13	Dublin Death Patrol	DDP 4 Life
16	Annihilator	Metal
16	Mayhem	Ordo Ad Chao
16	Pain	Psalms of Extinction
16	Shining	Halmstad
16	W.A.S.P.	Dominator
17	Nine Inch Nails	Year Zero
17	Six Feet Under	Commandment
20	Ensiferum	Victory Songs
20	Freedom Call	Dimensions
20	Vomitory	Terrorize Brutalize Sodomize
23	After Forever	After Forever
23	Root	Daemon Viam Invenient
24	At War With Self	Acts of God
24	Dark Tranquillity	Fiction
24	Dimmu Borgir	In Sorte Diaboli
24	Deliverance	As Above - So Below
24	Mammatus	The Coast Explodes
24	Marduk	Rom 5:12
24	Sanctity	Road to Bloodshed
24	Walknut	Graveforests and Their Shadows
26	Angel Corpse	Of Lucifer and Lightning
27	Inveracity	Extermination of Millions
27	Vintersorg	Solens rötter
30	Detonation	Emission Phase

=== May ===
Day	Artist	Album
7	Twilightning	Swinelords
8	Becoming the Archetype	The Physics of Fire
8	Immolation	Shadows In The Light
8	Lord Belial	Revelation: The 7th Seal
8	Neurosis	Given to the Rising
8	With Passion	What We See When We Shut Our Eyes
8	Woe of Tyrants	Behold the Lion
12	Trouble	Simple Mind Condition
14	Hatesphere	Serpent Smiles And Killer Eyes
15	Job for a Cowboy	Genesis
15	Megadeth	United Abominations
15	Secret Chiefs 3	Path of Most Resistance
18	Planet X	Quantum
18	U.D.O.	Mastercutor
21	8 Foot Sativa	Poison of Ages
22	Daysend	The Warning
22	Despised Icon	The Ills of Modern Man
22	Ozzy Osbourne	Black Rain
22	Sonata Arctica	Unia
22	Sonic Syndicate	Only Inhuman
23	Sigh	Hangman's Hymn
25	Altaria	Divine Invitation
25	Caliban	The Awakening
25	Månegarm	Vargstenen
25	Visions of Atlantis	Trinity
28	3 Inches of Blood	Fire Up the Blades
28	Akercocke	Antichrist
28	Turisas	The Varangian Way
29	Cephalic Carnage	Xenosapien
30	Ari Koivunen	Fuel For The Fire
30	Sturm Und Drang	Learning to Rock
31	Buckethead	Acoustic Shards

=== June ===
Day	Artist	Album
4	Dream Theater	Systematic Chaos
4	Iced Earth	Overture of the Wicked
4	Man Must Die	The Human Condition
5	Devin Townsend	Ziltoid the Omniscient
5	Graveworm	Collateral Defect
5	Ion Dissonance	Minus the Herd
5	Kamelot	Ghost Opera
5	Marilyn Manson	Eat Me, Drink Me
5	Nocturnal Rites	The 8th Sin
5	Tesla	Real To Reel
12	A Perfect Murder	War of Aggression
12	Anterior	This Age of Silence
12	Forever in Terror	Restless in the Tides
12	Municipal Waste	The Art of Partying
12	Pig Destroyer	Phantom Limb
17	Abigor	Fractal Possession
19	August Burns Red	Messengers
22	Candlemass	King of the Grey Islands
23	Airbourne	Runnin' Wild
25	Entombed	Serpent Saints
25	Architects	Ruin
26	King Diamond	Give Me Your Soul...Please
26	Korpiklaani	Tervaskanto
26	Symphony X	Paradise Lost
29	At Vance	VII

=== July ===
Day	Artist	Album
3	Velvet Revolver	Libertad
10	Darkest Hour	Deliver Us
11	Galexia	Galexia
12	Carnifex	Dead in My Arms
17	Behemoth	The Apostasy
17	Eyefear	A World Full of Grey
17	Malevolent Creation	Doomsday X
17	Nile	Ithyphallic
18	Blood Stain Child	Mozaiq
24	Evergreen Terrace	Wolfbiker
24	The Red Chord	Prey for Eyes
24	Within Temptation	The Heart of Everything
31	DevilDriver	The Last Kind Words
31	Five Finger Death Punch	The Way of the Fist
31	Korn	Untitled
31	Whitechapel	The Somatic Defilement

=== August ===
Day	Artist	Album
3	Gorefest	Rise to Ruin
7	The Absence	Riders of the Plague
7	AM Conspiracy	Out of the Shallow End
7	Drowning Pool	Full Circle
7	Fuel	Angels & Devils
7	Reverend Bizarre	III: So Long Suckers
7	Still Remains	The Serpent
7	Throwdown	Venom & Tears
8	Alcest	Souvenirs d'un autre monde
9	Agathocles	Senseless Trip
12	Anvil	This Is Thirteen
14	The Agonist	Once Only Imagined
14	Arsonists Get All the Girls	The Game of Life
15	Amoral	Reptile Ride
20	Malefice	Entities
21	As I Lay Dying	An Ocean Between Us
21	Blue Cheer	What Doesn't Kill You...
21	The Devil Wears Prada	Plagues
21	Through the Eyes of the Dead	Malice
22	Andre Matos	Time to Be Free
22	Dimension Zero	He Who Shall Not Bleed
22	Epica	The Divine Conspiracy
22	Galneryus	One for All – All for One
22	Rob Rock	Garden of Chaos
23	Flactorophia, Demonic Dismemberment, Eternal Mystery, Vomitous Discharge, Engravor, Vomitorial Corpulence	6-Way Sin Decomposition
24	Backslash	Trip of Pain
25	Benediction	Killing Music
25	Divine Heresy	Bleed The Fifth
27	Evile	Enter the Grave
28	Obituary	Xecutioner's Return
28	Scorpions	Humanity: Hour I
29	Amorphis	Silent Waters
31	Agent Steel	Alienigma
31	Drudkh	Estrangement

=== September ===
Day	Artist	Album
3	Alchemist	Tripsis
3	Vanishing Point	The Fourth Season
4	Aeon	Rise to Dominate
4	Baroness	The Red Album
4	Chiodos	Bone Palace Ballet
4	Every Time I Die	The Big Dirty
4	Impending Doom	Nailed. Dead. Risen.
4	Zonaria	Infamy and the Breed
5	Ajattara	Kalmanto
5	Disavowed	Stagnated Existence
7	Epica	The Divine Conspiracy
11	Iced Earth	Framing Armageddon: Something Wicked Part 1
14	Apocalyptica	Worlds Collide
14	Elvenking	The Scythe
14	HIM	Venus Doom
18	A Life Once Lost	Iron Gag
18	Between the Buried and Me	Colors
18	The Black Dahlia Murder	Nocturnal
18	Blotted Science	The Machinations of Dementia
18	Brown Brigade	Into the Mouth of Badd(d)ness
18	High on Fire	Death Is This Communion
18	Himsa	Summon in Thunder
18	Ministry	The Last Sucker
18	Suicide Silence	The Cleansing
18	War from a Harlots Mouth	Transmetropolitan
24	Arch Enemy	Rise of the Tyrant
24	Darkthrone	F.O.A.D.
24	Down	Down III: Over the Under
25	The Bled	Silent Treatment
25	Carl Johan Grimmark	Grimmark
25	Dethklok	The Dethalbum
25	Wolves in the Throne Room	Two Hunters
26	Akira Takasaki	Black Brown
26	Nightwish	Dark Passion Play
28	Sodom	The Final Sign of Evil

=== October ===
Day	Artist	Album
1	Axel Rudi Pell	Diamonds Unlocked
2	Animosity	Animal
2	Born of Osiris	The New Reign
2	Skeletonwitch	Beyond The Permafrost
5	Alter Bridge	Blackbird
6	Parkway Drive	Horizons
9	Astral Doors	New Revelation
9	I Declare War	Amidst the Bloodshed
9	Megadeth	Warchest
9	Overkill	Immortalis
9	Puddle of Mudd	Famous
15	Ava Inferi	The Silhouette
15	Taint	Secrets & Lies
16	Behold... The Arctopus	Skullgrid
16	Demiricous	Two (Poverty)
16	The Tony Danza Tapdance Extravaganza	Danza II: The Electric Boogaloo
19	Anabantha	Letanías Capítulo II
23	HammerFall	Steel Meets Steel: Ten Years of Glory
23	Helloween	Gambling with the Devil
23	Oh, Sleeper	When I Am God
23	Serj Tankian	Elect the Dead
23	Soilwork	Sworn to a Great Divide
25	Architects	Ruin
26	Exodus	The Atrocity Exhibition... Exhibit A
29	Anaal Nathrakh	Hell Is Empty and All the Devils Are Here
30	Avenged Sevenfold	Avenged Sevenfold
30	Bloodsimple	Red Harvest
30	Buckethead	Cyborg Slunks
30	Buckethead	Decoding the Tomb of Bansheebot
30	Melechesh	Emissaries
30	The Autumn Offering	Fear Will Cast No Shadow

=== November ===
Day	Artist	Album
5	The Dillinger Escape Plan	Ire Works
5	Novembre	The Blue
5	Opeth	The Roundhouse Tapes
6	Agnostic Front	Warriors
6	Demon Hunter	Storm the Gates of Hell
6	Impaled	The Last Gasp
16	Axxis	Doom of Destiny
16	Gamma Ray	Land of the Free II
16	Primordial	To the Nameless Dead
19	Tarja Turunen	My Winter Storm
20	Sebastian Bach	Angel Down
20	Vesania	Distractive Killusions
20	Electric Wizard	Witchcult Today
21	The Ocean	Precambrian

=== December ===
Day	Artist	Album
7	Blood of Kingu	De Occulta Philosophia

Preceded by 2006	Heavy Metal Timeline; 2007	Succeeded by 2008
