= Anterior (disambiguation) =

In anatomy, anterior refers to the front of the individual.

Anterior may also refer to:

- Anterior (phonetics), a category of speech sounds
- Anterior (band), a Welsh metal band
- Anterior tense, a relative past tense
