= Winternoise Festival =

Annual festival in Germany

- Genre: Heavy metal
- Dates: January
- Locations: Georgsmarienhütte, Germany
- Years active: 2006 – present
- Website: www.burningstage.net

Winternoise Festival is a heavy metal festival held annually in Germany since 2006. It is organized by the BurningStage agency. The 2007 edition took place on 13 January at Eventcenter B 51 in Georgsmarienhütte.

== Lineups ==
=== 2006 ===
- Dissection
- Rotten Sound
- The Duskfall
- The Vision Bleak
- Totenmond
- Sayyadina
- Abrogation

=== 2007 ===
- Moonspell
- Endstille
- Primordial
- Communic
- Sudden Death
- Moonsorrow
- A Life Divided

=== 2008 ===
- Thyrgrim
- Eisregen
- Impaled Nazarene
- Equilibrium
- Necrophobic
- Kampfar
- Tyr
- Manegarm
- Svartsot
- Impious

=== 2009 ===
- Arkona
- Mael Mordha
- Thyrfing
- Turisas
- Moonsorrow
