= Blood Rapture =

Studio album by Vomitory
- Released: May 20, 2002
- Recorded: 2001
- Studios: Berno Studios in Malmö, Sweden
- Genre: Death metal
- Length: 32:41
- Label: Metal Blade
- Producers: Henrik Larsson, Vomitory

Vomitory chronology
Revelation Nausea (2001)	Blood Rapture (2002)	Primal Massacre (2004)

Blood Rapture is the fourth studio album by Swedish death metal band Vomitory. It was released on May 20, 2002, on Metal Blade Records.

== Track listing ==
1. "Chaos Fury" – 3:09
2. "Hollow Retribution" – 2:13
3. "Blessed and Forsaken" – 3:45
4. "Madness Prevails" – 3:51
5. "Redeemed in Flames" – 4:24
6. "Nailed, Quartered, Consumed" – 2:21
7. "Eternity Appears" – 4:12
8. "Rotting Hill" – 3:36
9. "Blood Rapture" – 5:10

== Personnel ==
- Erik Rundqvist – bass guitar, vocals
- Tobias Gustafsson – drums
- Ulf Dalegren – guitar
- Urban Gustafsson – guitar
- Vomitory – production
- Henrik Larsson – production, engineering, mixing, mastering
