= Revelation Nausea =

Studio album by Vomitory
- Released: 2001
- Recorded: August 2000 at Berno Studios in Malmö, Sweden
- Genre: Death metal
- Length: 39:31
- Label: Metal Blade
- Producer: Henrik Larsson, Vomitory

Vomitory chronology
Redemption (1999)	Revelation Nausea (2001)	Blood Rapture (2002)

Revelation Nausea is the third album by Swedish death metal band Vomitory. It was released in 2001 on Metal Blade.

== Track listing ==
1. "Revelation Nausea" – 3:16
2. "The Corpsegrinder Experience" – 4:20
3. "Beneath the Soil" – 4:56
4. "Under Clouds of Blood" – 2:42
5. "The Art of War" – 4:01
6. "When Silence Conquers" – 6:22
7. "Chapter of Pain" – 3:34
8. "The Holocaust" – 4:05
9. "Exhaling Life" – 3:37
10. "9mm Salvation" – 2:38

== Personnel ==
- Erik Rundqvist – bass guitar, vocals
- Tobias Gustafsson – drums
- Ulf Dalegren – guitar
- Urban Gustafsson – guitar
- Cliff – vocals ("The Art of War")
- Vomitory – production
- Henrik Larsson – production
- Göran Finnberg – mastering (at The Mastering Room)
- Peter Wallgren – cover art
- Micke Sörensen – photography
