= Portals to Uphobia =

Studio album by Detonation
- Released: September 12, 2005
- Recorded: 2004–2005
- Genre: Melodic death metal
- Length: 43:50
- Label: Osmose Productions
- Producer: Detonation and Hans Pieters

Detonation chronology
An Epic Defiance (2002)	Portals to Uphobia (2005)	Emission Phase (2007)

Professional ratings
Review scores
Source	Rating
Allmusic	link

Portals to Uphobia is the second full-length studio album Detonation released on the French label Osmose Productions.

The artwork for the album was created by Niklas Sundin of Dark Tranquillity.

== Track listing ==
1. "Into Sulphur I Descend" − 5:13
2. "Portals to Uphobia" − 3:07
3. "Structural Deceit" − 4:44
4. "Chaos Banished" − 3:59
5. "End of Sight, End of Fears" − 4:40
6. "Lost Euphoria Part III (instrumental)" − 3:51
7. "The Loss of Motion Control" − 4:31
8. "Solitude Reflected" − 5:01
9. "Beyond the Margin" − 4:01
10. "The Source to Delve" − 4:44

== Credits ==
=== Band members ===
- Koen Romeijn − Vocals, Guitar
- Mike Ferguson − Guitar
- Thomas Kalksma − Drums
- Otto Schimmelpenninck − Bass guitar

=== Guest appearances ===
- Michiel Bikker − first guitar solo on track 5

=== Other ===
- Niklas Sundin − Cover Artwork
