= The Killer (Impious album) =

Studio album by Impious
- Released: 9 September 2002
- Genre: Death metal
- Length: 40:58
- Label: Hammerheart Records

Impious chronology
Terror Succeeds (2000)	The Killer (2002)	The Deathsquad (2002)

The Killer is a 2002 album by Swedish death metal band Impious.

Professional ratings
Review scores
Source	Rating
Chronicles of Chaos	7/10 stars
Global Domination	6.5/10 stars
Lords of Metal	88/100

== Track listing ==
No.	Title	Length
1.	"Intro"	1:32
2.	"Burn the Cross"	3:25
3.	"Dead Eyes Open"	3:46
4.	"Caught in Flesh"	4:14
5.	"The Deathsquad"	3:30
6.	"Sick Sex Six"	4:12
7.	"The Hitman"	4:51
8.	"Kill For Glory"	3:23
9.	"Stabbed 69 Times"	4:43
10.	"Needles of Sin"	4:46
11.	"Digital Devil"	2:36
