= Breed the Pain =

Breed The Pain

Studio album by 8 Foot Sativa
- Released: 11 January 2005 (NZ); 17 March 2005 (worldwide); 18 April 2005 (Australia)
- Genre: Death metal Thrash metal
- Length: 40:31
- Label: Intergalactic Records (NZ); Black Mark Records (worldwide); Roadrunner Records (Australia)

8 Foot Sativa chronology
Season For Assault (2003)	Breed The Pain (2005)	Poison Of Ages (2007)

Breed The Pain is the third album by New Zealand metal band 8 Foot Sativa. It was released in New Zealand on 11 January 2005 by Intergalactic Records. It was later released worldwide on 7 March 2005 by Black Mark Records, and in Australia on 18 April 2005 by Roadrunner Records. This album was the only album to feature vocalist Matt Sheppard. Sheppard's girlfriend did the artwork for this album.

== Track listing ==
1. "Perpetual Torment" (Gary Smith) – 4:19
2. "Breed the Pain" (Smith) – 3:45
3. "I Live My Death" (Brent Fox, Smith) – 5:13
4. "Mentally Castrated" (Matt Sheppard) – 4:18
5. "Altar of Obscenity" (Smith) – 5:00
6. "Human Abattoir" (Smith) – 3:53
7. "Brutal Revenge" (M. Sheppard) – 5:35
8. "The Punishment Within" (M. Sheppard) – 3:59
9. "Genetic Treason" (M. Sheppard) – 4:29

== Credits ==
- Matt Sheppard - vocals
- Gary Smith - Guitar
- Brent Fox - Bass guitar
- Sam Sheppard - drums
