= Within Dividia =

Studio album by The End
- Released: January 13, 2004
- Genre: Mathcore, metalcore
- Length: 33:31
- Label: Relapse

The End chronology
Transfer Trachea Reverberations from Point: False Omniscient (2002)	Within Dividia (2004)	Elementary (2007)

Professional ratings
Review scores
Source	Rating
Allmusic	4/5 stars

Within Dividia is the second album released by Canadian mathcore band The End.

== Track listing ==
1. "These Walls" – 4:41
2. "Fetesque" – 3:55
3. "The Sense of Reverence" – 3:04
4. "The Scent of Elegance" – 3:13
5. "Organelle (In She We Lust)" – 4:11
6. "Dear Martyr" – 3:43
7. "Orthodox Unparalleled" – 5:25
8. "Of Fist and Flame" – 5:19
