= An Epic Defiance =

Studio album by Detonation
- Released: October, 2002 (original release); June 16, 2003 (re-release)
- Recorded: 2002
- Genres: Death metal Thrash metal
- Length: 45:57
- Label: Osmose Productions
- Producers: Detonation and Hans Pieters

Detonation chronology
Promo (2001)	An Epic Defiance (2002)	Portals to Uphobia (2005)

An Epic Defiance is the debut album by the metal band Detonation. It was initially issued in October 2002 as a self-financed independent release. In January 2003, the band signed a three-album deal with the French Osmose Productions label, who released the album worldwide in June 2003 on CD and limited edition LP.

The artwork for the album was created by Niklas Sundin of Dark Tranquillity.

The album was rated a 5+ out of 5 by The Metal Crypt.

== Track listing ==
1. "The Dawning (intro)" − 0:40
2. "An Epic Defiance" − 3:28
3. "The Prophecy Unfolds" − 3:45
4. "Sword-Carved Skin" − 5:56
5. "Forever Buried Pain" − 3:41
6. "Crawling Through Vile" − 3:41
7. "The Collision of Despair" − 5:31
8. "Deserving Death" − 3:14
9. "Voices Beyond Reason" − 4:34
10. "Lost Euphoria Part II (instrumental)" − 2:17
11. "The Last of My Commands" − 4:08
12. "Starve" − 5:00

== Credits ==
=== Band members ===
- Koen Romeijn − Vocals, Guitar
- Mike Ferguson − Guitar
- Thomas Kalksma − Drums
- Otto Schimmelpenninck − Bass guitar

=== Guest appearances ===
- George Oosthoek − additional speech on track 4 and additional vocals on track 5
- Jorre Jansen − additional vocals on tracks 3 and 11
- Daniel Nak − additional vocals on tracks 6 and 11

=== Other ===
- Niklas Sundin − Cover artwork
