= Portals (Arsonists Get All the Girls album) =

Studio album by Arsonists Get All the Girls
- Released: July 14, 2009
- Recorded: 2009
- Genres: Progressive metalcore, deathcore
- Length: 52:59
- Label: Century Media

Arsonists Get All the Girls chronology
The Game of Life (2007)	Portals (2009)	Motherland (2011)

Portals is the third studio album by Arsonists Get All the Girls. It was released on July 14, 2009 through Century Media Records. In contrast to The Game of Life, Portals features a different sound and an almost completely different line-up, with guitarist Arthur Alvarez and drummer Garin Rosen the only two original members left.

Reviews for Portals were positive, and the album reached high critical acclaim. Arsonists Get All the Girls began their headlining tour in support of Portals in late 2010.

== Background ==
Portals was written and recorded in 2009. It is the first release by the band to feature a major line-up change. Original vocalists Cameron Reed and Remi Rodburg, decided to leave during a tour, and were replaced with Jared Monette. Original bassist, Patrick Mason, died of alcohol poisoning, and was replaced with Jaeson Bardoni.

The song "In the Empyreans" is written about the death of former bassist Mason. It was written by Arthur Alvarez and Rodburg, and features guest vocals by Rodburg. The album's title track is the longest song ever recorded by the band and has been described to combine all of the sounds Portals features together.

== Critical reception ==
Professional ratings
Review scores
Source	Rating
AbsolutePunk	7.5/10 stars
AllMusic	4/5 stars
Rock Sound	6/10 stars

The album was generally praised by reviewers, noting that the new line-up has taken the musical style in a new direction, and that the band is generally "growing up". AbsolutePunk reviewer Dymytry Vance also noted that the band have changed their overall sound. He also stated that the album is "their best work to date".

== Track listing ==
All tracks are written by Arsonists Get All the Girls.

No.	Title	Length
1.	"Interdimensionary"	1:24
2.	"The 42nd Ego"	3:30
3.	"My Cup's Half Empty"	3:02
4.	"Skiff for the Suits"	3:39
5.	"In the Empyreans" (feat. Remi Rodberg)	4:03
6.	"Saturnine"	3:23
7.	"Violence in Fluid: Triceratops"	4:01
8.	"Portals"	7:25
9.	"I Lost My Loss of Ruin"	2:59
10.	"To Playact in Static"	4:50
11.	"Tea Time Tibbons"	14:43
Total length:		52:59

== Personnel ==
- Arthur Alvarez – guitar
- Jaeson Bardoni – bass guitar
- Jared Monette – vocals
- Sean Richmond – keyboards
- Garin Rosen – drums
- Derek Yarra – guitar
