= Carnage Euphoria =

Studio album by Vomitory
- Released: May 8, 2009
- Recorded: 2009 at Leon Music Studio in Karlstad, Sweden
- Genre: Death metal
- Length: 39:04
- Label: Metal Blade
- Producers: Rikard Löfgren, Vomitory

Vomitory chronology
Terrorize Brutalize Sodomize (2007)	Carnage Euphoria (2009)	Opus Mortis VIII (2011)

Professional ratings
Review scores
Source	Rating
Blabbermouth	7.5/10 stars

Carnage Euphoria is the seventh album by Swedish death metal band Vomitory. It was released on May 8, 2009, on Metal Blade.

== Track listing ==
1. "The Carnage Rages On" – 4:30
2. "Serpents" – 3:24
3. "A Lesson in Virulence" – 4:46
4. "Ripe Cadavers" – 4:19
5. "Rage of Honour" – 2:35
6. "The Ravenous Dead" – 4:31
7. "Deadlock" – 3:10
8. "Rebirth of the Grotesque" – 4:04
9. "Possessed" – 2:14
10. "Great Deceiver" – 5:25

== Personnel ==
- Erik Rundqvist – bass guitar, vocals
- Tobias Gustafsson – drums
- Peter Östlund – guitar
- Urban Gustafsson – guitar
- Vomitory – production
- Rikard Löfgren – production, engineering, mixing, mastering

== Release ==
Carnage Euphoria was released in Germany, Austria and Switzerland on May 8, 2009; in Sweden and Finland on May 12, 2009; and in the rest of Europe on May 11, 2009.
