= This War Will Last Forever =

Studio album by Mendeed
- Released: February 6, 2005
- Genre: Metalcore
- Label: Rising Records; Nuclear Blast (Re-release only)
- Producer: Mark Daghorn/Mendeed

Mendeed chronology
From Shadows Came Darkness (2004)	This War Will Last Forever (2005)	The Dead Live By Love (2007)

This War Will Last Forever (Nuclear Blast Re-Release)
- The cover artwork for the Nuclear Blast re-release

Professional ratings
Review scores
Source	Rating
Allmusic	2.5/5 stars
Drowned In Sound	(8/10)

This War Will Last Forever is the debut album by Scottish metalcore band Mendeed.

== Track listing ==
=== Standard version ===
1. "All That We Have Become (Intro)" - 3:38
2. "Beneath a Burning Sky" - 5:08
3. "Stand As One and Fight For Glory" - 4:55
4. "Remains of the Day" - 4:52
5. "Chapel Perilous" - 3:18
6. "The Mourning Aftermath" - 5:55
7. "Poisoned Hearts" - 3:21
8. "Withered and Torn" - 4:11
9. "Resurrecting Hope" - 4:08
10. "For Blasphemy We Bleed" - 6:19
11. "The Reaper Waits" - 3:58
12. "The Black Death" - 10:12

=== Nuclear Blast re-release ===
1. "All That We Have Become (Intro)" - 3:38
2. "Beneath a Burning Sky" - 5:08
3. "Stand As One and Fight For Glory" - 4:55
4. "Remains of the Day" - 4:52
5. "Chapel Perilous" - 3:18
6. "The Mourning Aftermath" - 5:55
7. "Poisoned Hearts" - 3:21
8. "Withered and Torn" - 4:11
9. "Resurrecting Hope" - 4:08
10. "For Blasphemy We Bleed" - 6:19
11. "The Reaper Waits" - 3:58
12. "The Black Death" - 4:42
13. The End of Man" (Bonus Track) - 3:35
14. Divided We Fall" (Bonus Track) - 10:03

=== Japanese release ===
1. "All That We Have Become (Intro)" - 3:38
2. "Beneath A Burning Sky" - 5:08
3. "Stand As One And Fight For Glory" - 4:55
4. "Remains of the Day" - 4:52
5. "Chapel Perilous" - 3:18
6. "The Mourning Aftermath" - 5:55
7. "Poisoned Hearts" - 3:21
8. "Withered And Torn" - 4:11
9. "Resurrecting Hope" - 4:08
10. "For Blasphemy We Bleed" - 6:19
11. "The Reaper Waits" - 3:58
12. "The Black Death" - 4:42
13. "Laid To Waste" - 4:13
14. "Perpetual Sin" - 5:25
15. "Messiah" - 4:12
