= Meta (Car Bomb album) =

Studio album by Car Bomb
- Released: October 28, 2016
- Recorded: 2015–2016
- Genres: Mathcore; djent
- Length: 48:20
- Label: Independent
- Producers: Joe Duplantier, Greg Kubacki

Car Bomb chronology
w^w^^w^w (2012)	Meta (2016)	Mordial (2019)

Meta is the third album by the American mathcore band Car Bomb. The album was produced by Gojira's Joseph Duplantier and guitarist Greg Kubacki and released independently on digital and CD formats on 28 October 2016.

In September, the band released five second fragments of the song "From the Dust of This Planet" through music sharing for fans to assemble in any order to form a complete song. Tracks "From the Dust of This Planet", "Sets", and "Gratitude" were released as previews, and "Black Blood" as a video.

The album features guest vocals from Joe Duplantier on "The Oppressor" and Suffocation's Frank Mullen on "Sets".

== Reception ==
The album was praised in a review for its originality and how "paralyzing and oppressively heavy" it is. Axl Rosenberg of MetalSucks exclaimed "My mind is too blown by this record."

== Track listing ==
No.	Title	Length
1.	"From the Dust of This Planet"	3:09
2.	"Secrets Within"	4:58
3.	"Nonagon"	3:15
4.	"Gratitude"	4:22
5.	"Constant Sleep"	4:17
6.	"The Oppressor"	4:42
7.	"Black Blood"	4:18
8.	"Sets"	4:10
9.	"Cenotaph"	5:08
10.	"Lights Out"	4:18
11.	"Infinite Sun"	5:39

== Personnel ==
- Michael Dafferner – lead vocals
- Elliot Hoffman – drums
- Greg Kubacki – guitar
- Jon Modell – bass
- Joe Duplantier – guest vocals on "The Oppressor"
- Frank Mullen – guest vocals on "Sets"
- Produced by Joe Duplantier and Greg Kubacki
- Mixed and mastered by Josh Wilbur
- Engineered by Alexis Berthelot
