= From Shadows Came Darkness =

Album by Mendeed

EP by Mendeed
- Released: 2004
- Genre: Metalcore
- Length: 36mins
- Label: Rising Records
- Producer: Mark Daghorn

Mendeed chronology
As We Rise EP (2003)	From Shadows Came Darkness (2004)	This War Will Last Forever (2005)

From Shadows Came Darkness is an EP by metal band Mendeed.

== Track listing ==
1. "Hope Lies in The Heart of Even the Darkest Soul"
2. "Act of Sorrow"
3. "Blood Laced Tears"
4. "Ignite the Flames"
5. "Fatal Poison Whisper"
6. "Perpetual Sin"
7. "Glory Be Thy Name"

== Personnel ==
- Dave Proctor - Vocals
- Steve Nixon - Lead Guitar
- Steph Gildea - Rhythm Guitar
- Chris Lavery - Bass, Vocals, Backing Vocals
- Kevin Mathews - Drums
- Additional Vocals on tracks 2, 4, 6 provided by Sarah Jane
- Produced, Engineered and mixed by Mark Daghorn
- Mastered by Nigel Palmer at Lowland Masters.
- Recorded at New Rising Studios, Peldon, Essex and The Chapel, South Thoresby, Lincolnshire
- Mixed at New Rising Studios
