= Primal Massacre =

Studio album by Vomitory
- Released: April 19, 2004
- Recorded: 2004
- Genre: Death metal
- Length: 34:21
- Label: Metal Blade
- Producer: Henrik Larrson, Vomitory

Vomitory chronology
Blood Rapture (2002)	Primal Massacre (2004)	Terrorize Brutalize Sodomize (2007)

Primal Massacre is the fifth album by Swedish death metal band Vomitory. It was released on April 19, 2004, on Metal Blade.

== Track listing ==
1. "Primal Massacre" – 3:30
2. "Gore Apocalypse" – 3:54
3. "Stray Bullet Kill" – 4:06
4. "Epidemic (Created to Kill)" – 3:45
5. "Demons Divine" – 3:45
6. "Autopsy Extravaganza" – 2:58
7. "Retaliation" – 2:55
8. "Condemned by Pride" – 3:49
9. "Cursed Revelations" – 2:21
10. "Chainsaw Surgery" – 3:11

== Personnel ==
- Erik Rundqvist – bass guitar, vocals
- Tobias Gustafsson – drums
- Ulf Dalegren – guitar
- Urban Gustafsson – guitar
- Vomitory – production
- Henrik Larrson – production
