= Transfer Trachea Reverberations from Point: False Omniscient =

Studio album by The End
- Released: September 14, 2002
- Genre: Mathcore, metalcore
- Length: 22:05
- Label: Relapse

The End chronology
Transfer Trachea Reverberations from Point: False Omniscient (2002)	Within Dividia (2004)

Professional ratings
Review scores
Source	Rating
Allmusic	3/5 stars

Transfer Trachea Reverberations from Point: False Omniscient is the debut album from Canadian mathcore band The End. The album was first released on Re-define Records in 2001, and was re-released on Relapse Records a year later.

== Track listing ==
1. "Her (Inamorata)" – 2:43
2. "Opalescence.I" – 2:38
3. "Opalescence.II" – 2:52
4. "The Asphyxiation of Lisa-Claire" – 4:16
5. "For Mankind, Limited Renewal" – 2:00
6. "Sonnet" – 3:54
7. "Entirety in Infancy" – 3:42
