= Death Domination =

Studio album by Impious
- Released: November 23, 2009 in Europe; November 24, 2009 in North America
- Recorded: 2009
- Genre: Thrash metal Death metal
- Length: 36:11
- Label: Metal Blade Records

Impious chronology
Holy Murder Masquerade (2007)	Death Domination (2009)

Death Domination is an album by Swedish band Impious. It was released on November 23, 2009, in Europe and on November 24, 2009, in North America through Metal Blade Records.

AllMusic stated in its review of the album, "this album is full of material that could send a mosh pit into overdrive."

== Track listing ==
Death Domination track listing
No.	Title	Length
1.	"Abomination Glorified"	2:29
2.	"The Demand"	2:55
3.	"I Am the King"	3:07
4.	"And the Empire Shall Fall"	5:30
5.	"Dead Awakening"	3:33
6.	"Hate Killing Project"	3:34
7.	"Rostov Ripper"	4:24
8.	"Legions"	3:09
9.	"As Death Lives in Me"	4:18
10.	"Irreligious State of War"	3:12
Total length:		36:11
