= W^w^^w^w =

w^w^^w^w

Studio album by Car Bomb
- Released: September 25, 2012
- Recorded: 2012
- Genres: Mathcore; djent
- Length: 49:56
- Label: Self-released

Car Bomb chronology
Centralia (2007)	w^w^^w^w (2012)	Meta (2016)

w^w^^w^w is the second studio album by the American mathcore band Car Bomb, released in 2012. The album was first published online, reaching the #2 spot on Bandcamp's top sellers list during the first week of October 2012.

In a statement at the time of the album's release, the band described their approach as involving fractal patterning that many may find to be chaotic: "Most people will hear just random noise when listening to this record, but to us it's all really simple ideas. We're fascinated by the book Gödel, Escher, Bach by Douglas Hofstadter and we try to make music that is recursive. We try to establish certain themes and then shape and reuse them in different ways to create songs that have common threads within them. Patterns repeat, but not in ways you'd expect."

Reviews praise the album's rhythmic ferocity and chaotic nature. Doug Moore, in a positive review for Invisible Oranges, argues that "Most of Car Bomb’s riffs boil down to alien percussive sounds, mapped onto Byzantine rhythms." Andy O'Connor, writing for Pitchfork.com, compares Car Bomb to the influential Swedish metal band Meshuggah: "You’d be forgiven for thinking that New York experimental metal quartet Car Bomb were a Meshuggah tribute band. [… but] There are imitators, and there are groups who understand the essence, the soul of a group and build upon that distinctive sound. Car Bomb fall in the latter group."

== Track listing ==
No.	Title	Length
1.	"The Sentinel"	3:18
2.	"Auto-Named"	0:50
3.	"Finish It"	2:35
4.	"Lower The Blade"	4:26
5.	"Garrucha"	5:43
6.	"Third Revelation" (feat. Joe Duplantier)	4:23
7.	"Recursive Patterns"	3:12
8.	"Spirit of Poison"	5:40
9.	"Magic Bullet"	5:39
10.	"Crud"	4:06
11.	"This Will Do The Job"	5:40
12.	"The Seconds"	4:32

== Credits ==
- Michael Dafferner – lead vocals
- Elliot Hoffman – drums
- Greg Kubacki – guitar
- Jon Modell – bass
