= Hell Sweet Hell =

Studio album by Fear My Thoughts
- Released: 2005
- Genre: Melodic death metal
- Label: Lifeforce Records
- Producer: Jacob Hansen

Fear My Thoughts chronology
The Great Collapse (2004)	Hell Sweet Hell (2005)	Vulcanus (2007)

Hell Sweet Hell is Fear My Thoughts' fourth album, released in 2005.

== Track listing ==
1. "Intro" – 0:56
2. "Windows for the Dead" – 4:46
3. "In the Hourglass" – 4:28
4. "My Delight" – 4:40
5. "Sweetest Hell" – 3:48
6. "Dying Eyes" – 3:32
7. "Sadist Hour" – 4:14
8. "The Masters Call" – 4:14
9. "Ghosts of Time" – 4:11
10. "Satisfaction Guaranteed" – 4:22
11. "Tie Fighting" – 3:53
12. "...Trying to Feel" – 6:25

== Reception ==
Professional ratings
Review scores
Source	Rating
Allmusic	3.5/5 stars

While Jason Macneil of Allmusic praised Fear My Thoughts, Macneil said the subject matter behind Hell Sweet Hell at times overshadowed the band's musical performance.
