= Cut Up =

Swedish death metal band

- Origin: Sweden
- Genre: Death metal
- Years active: 2014–present
- Label: Metal Blade
- Spinoff of: Vomitory
- Members: Erik Rundqvist; Andreas Björnson; Anders Bertilsson; Tobias Gustafsson
- Website: www.cutupofficial.com

Cut Up is a Swedish death metal band formed by former members of Vomitory in 2014, and is currently signed to Metal Blade Records.

== Members ==
- Erik Rundqvist – bass guitar, vocals
- Andreas Björnson – guitar, vocals
- Anders Bertilsson – guitar
- Tobias Gustafsson – drums

== Discography ==
List of studio albums
Year	Album details
2015	Forensic Nightmares: Released: 29 June 2015; Label: Metal Blade
2017	Wherever They May Rot: Released: 24 March 2017; Label: Metal Blade
