= Echoes of the Fallen =

Studio album by Anterior
- Released: August 26, 2011
- Genres: Melodic death metal, thrash metal, progressive metal
- Length: 44:23
- Label: Metal Blade
- Producer: Scott Atkins

Anterior chronology
This Age of Silence (2007)	Echoes of the Fallen (2011)

Echoes of the Fallen is the second and final studio album of heavy metal band, Anterior. It was released by Metal Blade Records and the production was done by Scott Atkins.

== Track listing ==
1. "To Live Not Remain" – 4:42
2. "Blood in the Throne Room" – 5:08
3. "Tyranny" – 5:02
4. "Of Gods and Men" – 4:44
5. "By Horror Haunted" – 4:36
6. "Echoes of the Fallen" – 1:27
7. "The Evangelist" – 3:57
8. "Sleep Soundly No More" – 5:11
9. "Venomous" – 4:12
10. "Senora de las sombras" – 5:24

== Personnel ==
- Luke Davies – Vocals
- Leon Kemp – Guitar
- Steven Nixon – Guitar
- James Britton – Bass
- James Cook – Drums
