= Motherland (Arsonists Get All the Girls album) =

Studio album by Arsonists Get All the Girls
- Released: May 17, 2011
- Recorded: 2010
- Genre: Progressive metalcore, mathcore
- Length: 38:05
- Label: Century Media
- Producer: Arsonists Get All the Girls, Zack Ohren

Arsonists Get All the Girls chronology
Portals (2009)	Motherland (2011)	Listen to the Color (2013)

Motherland is the fourth studio album by Arsonists Get All the Girls. It was released on May 17, 2011.

== Background ==
Motherland was written and recorded in 2010. The song "Avdotya" was released on the band's Facebook page on March 24, 2011. The song "Dr. Teeth" was released through the band's Facebook page on April 7, 2011. The band began streaming the entire album to fans via the band's Myspace on May 10, 2011.

== Track listing ==
All tracks are written by Arsonists Get All the Girls.

No.	Title	Length
1.	"Rise to Fall"	3:34
2.	"Neck of the Contrast"	2:13
3.	"Gooseknuckle"	3:47
4.	"It Was a Memoir"	1:34
5.	"Dr. Teeth"	4:03
6.	"Avdotya"	2:31
7.	"Waiting for the War to Die"	0:44
8.	"West Cliffs"	2:52
9.	"Hemlock Like This"	3:03
10.	"Woebegone"	3:21
11.	"Our Super Symmetry"	1:27
12.	"Will Someone Please Turn Down the Ocean?"	3:13
13.	"Tempest"	5:43
Total length:		38:05

== Personnel ==
All personnel is listed as on Allmusic:

Arsonists Get All the Girls

- Arthur Alvarez – guitar
- Jaeson Bardoni – guitar
- Jared Monette – vocals, composition
- Sean Richmond – keyboards, backing vocals, lyrics
- Garin Rosen – drums
- Greg Howell – bass guitar

Additional personnel

- Kyle Stacher – fonts
- Zack Ohren – engineering, mastering, mixing, production
- Joshua Belanger – artwork design
