= Sinate =

New Zealand death/thrash metal band

- Origin: Auckland, New Zealand
- Genres: Death metal, Thrash metal
- Years active: 2001–present
- Labels: MGS Records
- Members: Matt Sheppard - vocals, guitar Matt Fawcett - guitar Brent Fox - bass Sam Sheppard - drums
- Past members: Antony Folwell; Steve Dogg; Bruce Klingenberg; Sean Parkinson; Munro Goodwin

Sinate is a New Zealand death/thrash metal band.

== History ==
The band was formed in 2001 (and went under the name 'Desecrator') but did not release their debut album, Beyond Human, until September 2005.

The band had disbanded in 2003 when Sam Sheppard joined 8 Foot Sativa, followed by Matt Sheppard. Both then left 8 Foot Sativa to reform Sinate in June 2005, joined by 8 Foot Sativa guitar technician Sean Parkinson and former member Antony "The Colonel" Folwell.

In 2006 they released their second album, Violent Ambitions, which was recorded in Sweden.

In 2007 the band performed at the Big Day Out music festival.

In 2009 Sean Parkinson was replaced by Matt Fawcett on guitar. Fawcett had supported Sinate in shows around New Zealand as the frontman for his band 'Damned Age', for which he performed vocals and guitar. Sinate left New Zealand to live & work in Europe. Some time previous to their departure, Folwell left the band. They initially based themselves in Stockholm, Sweden. They found a new bass player & settled in Berlin, Germany.

In early 2010 they toured Europe supporting Marduk & Vader on many dates of their 'Funeral Nation Tour', establishing their name across Europe.

In November 2010 they returned to New Zealand to do a national tour and spend time with relatives.

On 23 November 2010 Sinate announce signing to San Francisco label Apocrypha Records to release their 3rd full-length album 'To The Death' in 2011.

Late 2010 saw the departure of bassist Munro Goodwin. Brent Fox, formerly the bassist for 8 Foot Sativa, joined as a permanent member to fill in bass duties.

== Line-ups ==
=== Early line-up ===
- Matt Sheppard - vocals, guitar
- Steve Dogg - guitar
- Bruce Klingenberg - bass
- Sam Sheppard - drums

=== Line up from 2005-2008 ===
- Matt Sheppard - vocals, guitar
- Sean Parkinson - guitar
- Antony "Colonel" Folwell - bass
- Sam Sheppard - drums

=== Current line-up ===
- Matt Sheppard - vocals, guitar
- Matt Fawcett - lead guitar
- Brent Fox - Bass
- Sam Sheppard - drums

== Discography ==
Date of Release	Title	Label
27 September 2005	Beyond Human	MGS Records
20 October 2006	Violent Ambitions	MGS Records
2011	To the Death	
