= Redemption (Vomitory album) =

Studio album by Vomitory
- Released: 1999
- Recorded: July 1998 at Berno Studios in Malmö, Sweden
- Genre: Death metal
- Length: 33:11
- Label: Fadeless Records
- Producer: Vomitory, Henrik Larsson

Vomitory chronology
Raped in Their Own Blood (1996)	Redemption (1999)	Revelation Nausea (2001)

Redemption is the second album by Swedish death metal band Vomitory. It was released in 1999 on Fadeless Records. It is their first album with Erik Rundqvist, who would later also become vocalist for the band, on the bass and their first and only album with Jussi Linna on vocals.

== Track listing ==
1. "The Voyage" – 5:02
2. "Forty Seconds Bloodbath" – 3:48
3. "Forever in Gloom" – 2:51
4. "Heaps of Blood" – 4:37
5. "Embraced by Pain" – 3:45
6. "Redemption" – 4:11
7. "Ashes of Mourning Life" – 4:26
8. "Partly Dead" – 4:31

== Personnel ==
- Erik Rundqvist – bass guitar
- Tobias Gustafsson – drums
- Ulf Dalegren – guitar
- Urban Gustafsson – guitar
- Jussi Linna – vocals
- Jan-Tryggve Axelsson – guitar ("Ashes of Mourning Life")
- Henrik Larsson – production
- Peter "Wölf" Wallgren – artwork
- Micke Sörensen – photography
