= Season for Assault =

Season For Assault

Studio album by 8 Foot Sativa
- Released: 14 July 2003 (NZ); 12 April 2004 (Australia); 13 September 2004 (world)
- Genre: Death metal Thrash metal
- Length: 39:23
- Label: Intergalactic Records (NZ); Roadrunner Records (Australia); Black Mark Records (world)

8 Foot Sativa chronology
Hate Made Me (2002)	Season For Assault (2003)	Breed The Pain (2005)

Alternative Cover
- Australia Release Cover

Season For Assault is the second album by New Zealand metal band 8 Foot Sativa. It was released in New Zealand on 14 July 2003 by Intergalactic Records. It was later released in Australia on 12 April 2004 by Roadrunner Records, and worldwide on 13 September 2004 by Black Mark Records. This album was the last album to feature vocalist Justin 'Jackhammer' Niessen, and the first to feature drummer Sam Sheppard.

Some copies of the album feature a hidden track of "Hate Made Me".

== Track listing ==
1. What's Lost Is Tomorrow – 4:15
2. Escape from Reality – 4:54
3. For Religions to Suffer – 4:13
4. Destined to Be Dead – 3:47
5. Hatred Forever – 3:25
6. Season for Assault – 4:09
7. Chelsea Smile – 3:08
8. The Abused – 2:26
9. Disorder – 4:22
10. Gutless – 4:44

=== Bonus track ===
1. Hate Made Me - 3:14

== Credits ==
- Justin 'Jackhammer' Neissen - vocals
- Gary Smith - Guitar
- Brent Fox - Bass guitar
- Sam Sheppard - drums

== Charts ==
Year	Chart	Position
2003	New Zealand Billboard	6
October 2003	IMNZ Chart	1
