= Raped in Their Own Blood =

Studio album by Vomitory
- Released: 1996
- Recorded: April 1996 at Studio Prima Volta
- Genre: Death metal
- Length: 40:30
- Label: Fadeless Records
- Producer: Living Skull, Vomitory

Vomitory chronology
Raped in Their Own Blood (1996)	Redemption (1999)

Raped in Their Own Blood is the first album by Swedish death metal band Vomitory. It was released in 1996 on Fadeless Records.

== Track listing ==
1. "Nervegasclouds" – 5:19
2. "Raped in Their Own Blood" – 3:22
3. "Dark Grey Epoch" – 3:15
4. "Pure Death" – 3:11
5. "Through Sepulchral Shadows" – 4:56
6. "Inferno" – 2:44
7. "Sad Fog over Sinister Runes" – 4:50
8. "Into Winter Through Sorrow" – 4:22
9. "Perdition" – 2:50
10. "Thorns" – 5:41

== Personnel ==
- Ronnie Olson – vocals
- Thomas Bergqvist – bass guitar, backing vocals
- Tobias Gustafsson – drums
- Ulf Dalegren – guitar
- Urban Gustafsson – guitar
- Daniel "Zakk Wylde" Engström – guitar solo ("Pure Death")
- Vomitory – production
- Living Skull – production
- Volcanic Wolf – cover art
- H.P. Skoglund – photography
