= Vulcanus (album) =

Studio album by Fear My Thoughts
- Released: 2007
- Recorded: August 2006
- Genre: Melodic death metal
- Label: Century Media Records
- Producer: Jacob Hansen

Fear My Thoughts chronology
Hell Sweet Hell (2005)	Vulcanus (2007)	Isolation (2008)

Vulcanus is a studio album by Fear My Thoughts, released on January 15, 2007 in Europe, via Century Media.

== Background ==
The album encompasses elements of death metal, thrash metal and progressive rock. It features production contribution from Jacob Hansen.

== Track listing ==
No.	Title	Length
1.	"Accompanied by Death"	3:52
2.	"Blankness"	3:46
3.	"Culture of Fear"	6:43
4.	"Accelerate or Die"	4:11
5.	"Stamp of Credence"	5:57
6.	"Survival Scars"	4:17
7.	"Vulcanus"	5:13
8.	"Soul Consumer"	4:17
9.	"Both Blood"	4:05
10.	"Gates to Nowhere"	4:48
11.	"Lost in Black"	4:43
12.	"Wasteland"	5:04
Total length:		57:56
