= Fear My Thoughts =

German melodic death metal band

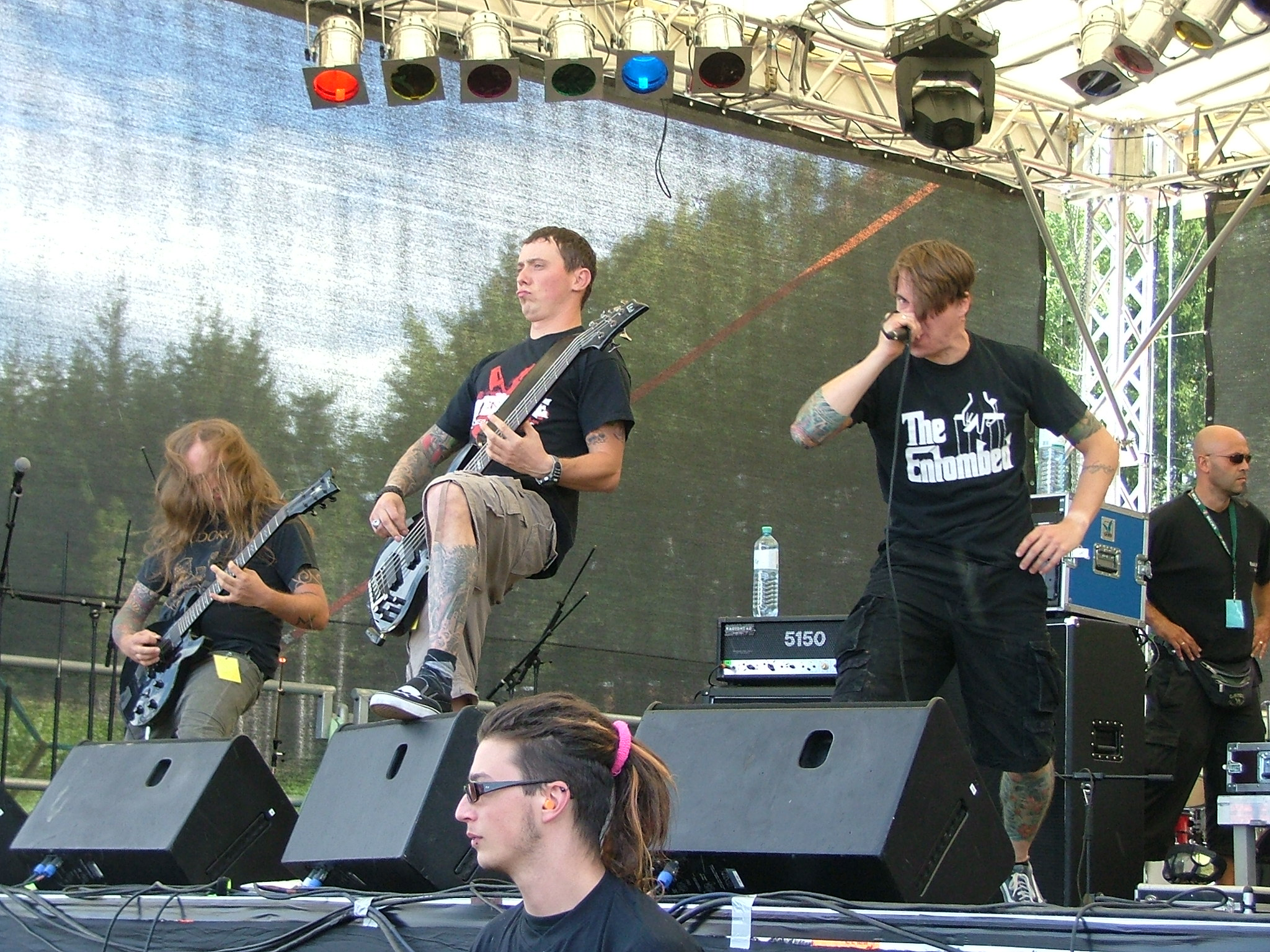
- Fear My Thoughts at 'Rock the Lake' in Finkenstein am Faaker See

Background information
- Origin: Freiburg, Germany
- Genres: Melodic death metal; metalcore (early)
- Years active: 1998–2010
- Labels: Century Media; Lifeforce; Let It Burn
- Members: Markus Ruf; Patrick Hagman; Bartosz Wojciechowski; Norman Lonhard; Martin Fischer
- Past members: Marco Allenstein; Lisa Graf; Alexander Kovats; Mathias Benedikt von Ockl

Fear My Thoughts was a German melodic death metal band from Rheinfelden, founded in 1997. Their album Vulcanus was produced by Jacob Hansen and was released on January 15, 2007. In November 2009, the band announced that they were planning to split up. A farewell show was set for February 2010 in Lörrach, Germany.

== Members ==
=== Current ===
- Markus Ruf - guitar
- Patrick Hagman - guitar
- Bartosz Wojciechowski - bass
- Norman Lonhard - drums
- Martin Fischer - vocals (since 2007)

=== Former ===
- Marco Allenstein - guitar
- Lisa Graf - violin
- Alexander Kovats - drums
- Mathias Benedikt von Ockl - vocals (1998–2007)

== Discography ==
- Sapere Aude (EP, 1999)
- 23 (2001)
- This Machine Runs on Fear (split, 2002)
- Vitriol (2003)
- The Great Collapse (2004)
- Hell Sweet Hell (2005)
- Smell Sweet Smell 2001-2002 (compilation, 2005)
- Vulcanus (2007)
- Isolation (2008)
