= Arsonists Get All the Girls =

American metal band

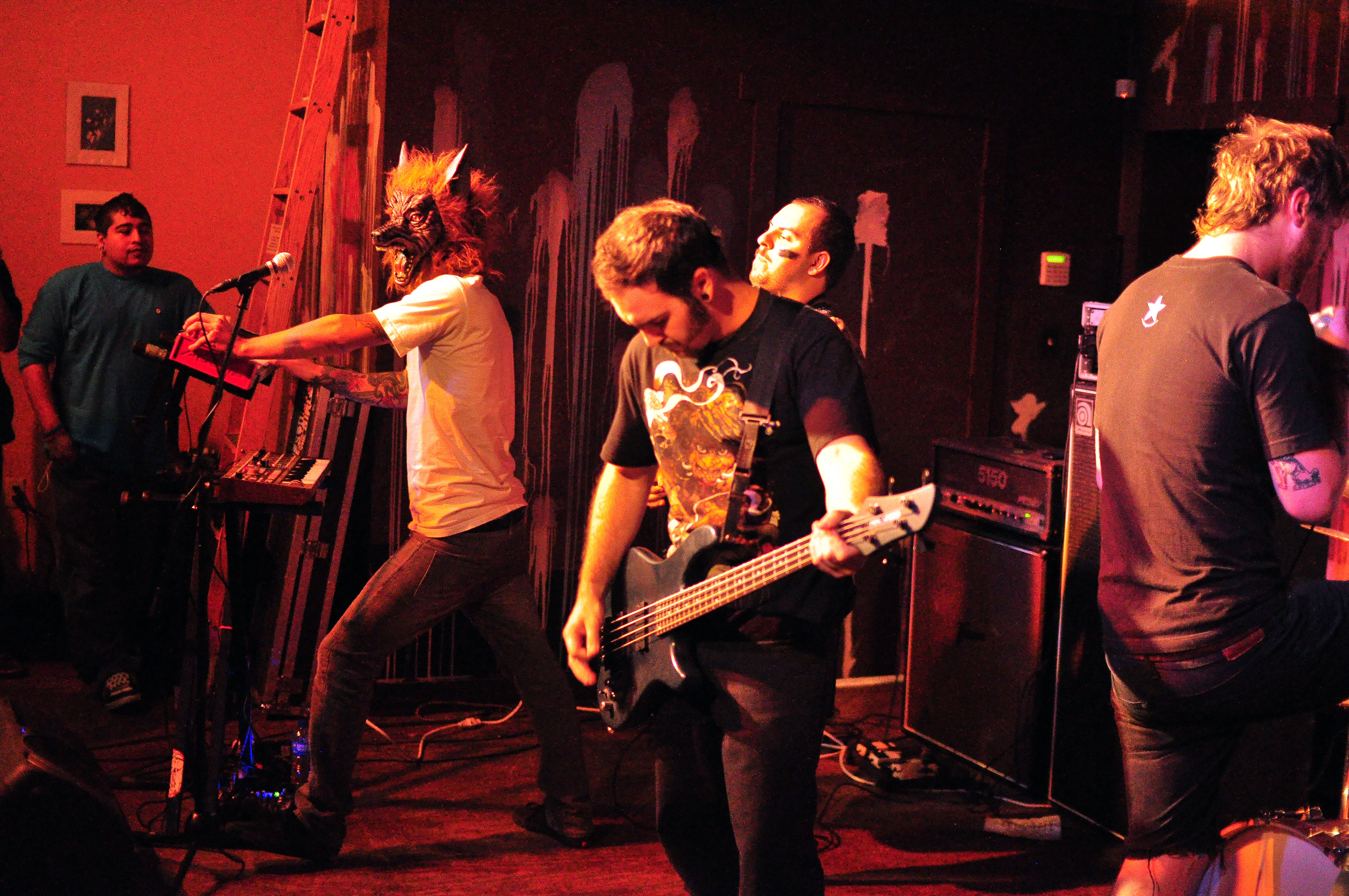
- Arsonists Get All the Girls performing in 2011

Background information
- Origin: Santa Cruz, California, U.S.
- Genres: Metalcore; deathcore; progressive metal; mathcore
- Years active: 2005–2015; 2016–2019; 2024–present
- Labels: Process; Century Media
- Past members: Sean Richmond; Sam Hafer; David Cubine; King Zabb; Garin Rosen; Jaeson Bardoni; Jared Monnette; Patrick Mason; James Lucas; Nick Cardinelli; Arthur Alvarez; Greg Howell; Remi Rødberg
- Website: Arsonists Get All the Girls on Facebook

Arsonists Get All the Girls is an American metalcore band from Santa Cruz, California. Founded in 2005, the band was noted for taking influence from varying genres, particularly in their early years for fusing deathcore with various electronic music influences while the band employed dual keyboardists. They were previously signed to Century Media Records and have released five studio albums: Hits from the Bow, The Game of Life, Portals, Motherland, and Listen to the Color.

== History ==
Arsonists Get All the Girls was founded in Santa Cruz, California, in 2005. The band first wanted to develop a sound similar to Horse the Band.

In November 2007, bassist Patrick Mason died of alcohol poisoning.

Arsonists Get All the Girls toured with Darkest Hour, Carnifex, and Bleeding Through, among others, in the Thrash and Burn European Tour 2009 in April and May 2009. The band was also scheduled to support It Dies Today on a North American tour in October 2009 but It Dies Today were denied access into Canada.

Their vocalist Cameron Reed left and was replaced by Jared Monnette. Reed returned as a guest vocalist alongside other founding vocalist Remi Rodberg on their fifth studio album, Listen To The Color which was released on August 1, 2013.

== Band members ==
Current

- Cameron Reed – lead vocals, keyboards (2005–2009, 2019)
- Sean Richmond – keyboards (2008–2015, 2016–2019), co-lead vocals (2008–2009, 2013–2015, 2019), lead vocals (2016–2019)
- Sam Hafer - guitar (2017–2019)
- King Zabb - bass (2017–2019)
- David Cubine – drums (2017–2019)

Former

- James Lucas – guitar (2005–2006)
- Adam Trowbridge – guitar (2005–2006)
- Derek Yarra – guitar (2008–2009)
- Garin Rosen - drums (2005-2015, 2016–2017)
- Jaeson Bardoni - guitar (2008-2009, 2009–2014), bass (2008, 2009)
- Adam Swan – bass (2007)
- Steve Dean – bass (2008)
- Kyle Stacher – bass (2014–2015)
- Ronnie Smith – guitar (2014–2015)
- Francesco Presotto – guitar (2016–2017)
- Brett Roos – guitar (2017)
- Joey Souza – bass (2017)
- Jared Monette – lead vocals (2009–2013)
- Travis Levitre – lead vocals (2014–2015)
- Patrick Mason – bass (2005–2007, died 2007)
- Nick Cardinelli – guitar (2006–2008)
- Arthur Alvarez – guitar (2005–2013)
- Greg Howell - bass (2009-2014, 2016-2017)
- Geoffrey Montague - keyboards (2005)
- Remi Rødberg - keyboards (2005-2008,2013-2015), co-lead vocals (2005–2008), lead vocals (2013–2015)

== Discography ==
Year	Album	Label
2005	3 Song Demo	Self-released
2006	Hits from the Bow	Process
2007	The Game of Life	Century Media
2009	Portals	Century Media
2011	Motherland	Century Media
2013	Listen to the Color	Self-released

== Music videos ==
Year	Song	Director
2007	"Shoeshine for Neptune"	Joey Betran
2009	"The 42nd Ego"	Jeremy Weiss
