= Holy Murder Masquerade =

Studio album by Impious
- Released: February 6, 2007
- Genre: Thrash metal
- Length: 37:37
- Label: Metal Blade Records

Impious chronology
Born to Suffer (2004)	Holy Murder Masquerade (2007)	Death Domination (2009)

Holy Murder Masquerade is an album by Swedish band Impious. It was released on February 6, 2007, through Metal Blade Records.

== Track listing ==
1. "The Confession"
2. "Bound to Bleed (For a Sacred Need)"
3. "T.P.S."
4. "Bloodcraft"
5. "Holy Murder Masquerade"
6. "Death on Floor 44"
7. "Slaughtertown Report"
8. "Three of One"
9. "Everlasting Punishment"
10. "Purified by Fire"
11. "Dark Closure"
