= This Age of Silence =

Studio album by Anterior
- Released: June 12, 2007
- Recorded: November 2006 – March 2007
- Genre: Melodic death metal, thrash metal, progressive metal
- Length: 43:08
- Label: Metal Blade
- Producer: Tim Hamill / Anterior

Anterior chronology
This Age of Silence (2007)	Echoes of the Fallen (2011)

Professional ratings
Review scores
Source	Rating
AllMusic	4/5 stars
Metal.de	5/10 stars
Rock Hard	8/10 stars
Sea of Tranquility	3.5/5 stars
Metal Crypt	2.5/5 stars

This Age of Silence is the debut album by heavy metal band, Anterior. It was released by Metal Blade Records and the production was done by Tim Hamill and the band itself.

== Track listing ==
1. "Ghosts of Dawn" - 1:36 (Instrumental)
2. "The Silent Divide" - 6:31
3. "Dead Divine" - 5:58
4. "Days of Deliverance" - 4:06
5. "Human Hive" - 5:31
6. "Stir of Echoes" - 2:14 (Instrumental)
7. "Scar City" - 6:12
8. "Seraph" - 6:32
9. "This Age of Silence" - 4:29
10. "Technical Difficulties" (Instrumental; Racer X cover; Japanese bonus track)

=== Notes ===
- All lyrics written and arranged by Leon Kemp and Luke Davies.
- All music written and arranged by Leon Kemp.
- All songs recorded and mixed at Sonic One Studios. Track 6, recorded in Gardener's Bathroom.

== Personnel ==
Anterior

- Luke Davies - Vocals
- Leon Kemp - Guitar
- James Britton - Bass
- Ross Andrews - Drums

Touring personnel

- Steven Nixon - Guitar - Nixon joined the band as a full-time member in September 2007, after the album had been released. Guitarist Leon Kemp recorded all guitar parts on the album.

Additional personnel

- Tim Hamill - Engineer, Producer, Album Mix
- Brad Vance - Album Mastering
- Brian Ames - Cover Artwork & Layout
