= The Dead Live by Love =

The Dead Live By Love

Studio album by Mendeed
- Released: February 19, 2007
- Genre: Metalcore
- Label: Rising Records/Nuclear Blast
- Producer: Mark Daghorn/Mendeed

Mendeed chronology
This War Will Last Forever (2005)	The Dead Live By Love (2007)

Professional ratings
Review scores
Source	Rating
Allmusic	3.5/5 stars
Sputnik Music	(3.5/5)

The Dead Live By Love is the second and final full-length album by Scottish metalcore band Mendeed.

== Track listing ==
1. "Burning Fear" - 4:15
2. "The Fight" - 3:30
3. "The Dead Live By Love" - 5:35
4. "Fuel the Fire" - 3:23
5. "Gravedigger" - 6:19
6. "Our War" - 3:10
7. "Blood Brothers" - 4:56
8. "Through Dead Eyes" - 3:16
9. "Reload 'n' Kill" - 5:15
10. "Take Me As I Am" - 4:36
11. "It's Not Over Yet" - 4:32
12. "Thirteen" - 4:54

== Bonus tracks ==
=== European Digipack ===
1. "Masquerade" - 3:52
- Enhanced CD features include:
  - Mendeed Media Player
  - The Dead Live By Love Music Video

=== Japanese edition ===
1. "Childplay" - 3:40
2. "Masquerade" - 3:52
- Enhanced CD features include:
  - The Dead Live By Love Music Video
