= Give Me Your Soul...Please =

Studio album by King Diamond
- Released: 26 June 2007
- Genre: Heavy metal
- Length: 53:58
- Label: Massacre

King Diamond chronology
Deadly Lullabyes: Live (2004)	Give Me Your Soul...Please (2007)	The Institute (TBA)

Give Me Your Soul...Please is the twelfth studio album by Danish heavy metal band King Diamond, released on 26 June 2007. The album's concept and cover art are both based on a painting titled "My Mother's Eyes". The black cat featured in the album is based on King's own cat, Magic. This was the last album to feature bassist Hal Patino, who was fired from the band in 2014, and guitarist Andy LaRocque who departed from the band in 2026.

In the July/August issue of UK metal magazine Zero Tolerance, King elaborated on the themes of the album, being a story of two dead children, murdered by their father, relating their tale to him. He stated that cases of parents killing their children and then themselves were a large influence, citing such an incident which occurred in Dallas four days before the interview took place. Coincidentally, the music video for "Give Me Your Soul" was also released the day after the highly publicized Chris Benoit double-murder and suicide.

== Plot summary ==
At the beginning, a sister and brother are waiting in the afterlife. The brother is to go to Hell, so the sister decides to find another soul for him so that he can follow her to Heaven ("The Dead"). She takes off to a house in Neverending Hill, where King Diamond lives with his black cat, Magic ("Neverending Hill"). The girl tries to contact him for help but she only manages to haunt him ("Is Anybody Here?", "Black of Night"). As the darkness grows, objects are moving on their own, lights flicker ("Shapes of Black") and the temperature drops to freezing levels ("Cold as Ice"), and haunted by the bodyless ghost with only a head ("The Floating Head"), King uses black magic to contact the girl ("The Cellar", "Pictures in Red"). She reveals that her father chopped up her brother with an axe, splashing her with his blood, then choked her to death before shooting himself in the head. The "Thirteen Judges" mistakenly think that the brother committed suicide, so she needs to find a soul free of sin for him ("Give Me Your Soul"). She wants Diamond's soul but, since she finds him full of sin when she gazes at him, he pleads with her to leave and find another soul before sunrise ("The Girl in the Bloody Dress"). The girl decides to come to "THIS house" (implying a visit at the listener's home) ("Moving On").

== Reception ==
The track "Never Ending Hill" was nominated for a 2008 Grammy Award for Best Metal Performance but lost to Slayer's "Final Six". The album peaked at #174 on the Billboard 200. Also the album charted in the Finnish Charts (peaked at #25) and in the Swedish Charts (peaked at #28).

A music video was filmed for "Give Me Your Soul". Depicting King and his bandmates as ghosts, it tells the story of the girl and her brother being killed by the father. It premiered on MTV's Headbanger's Ball on Wednesday 27 February 2008.

Professional ratings
Review scores
Source	Rating
AllMusic	3.5/5 stars
Lords of Metal	(75/100)
Digital Steel	(80/100)
About.com	3.5/5 stars

== Track listing ==
All songs written by King Diamond, except where noted.

No.	Title	Writer(s)	Length
1.	"The Dead"		1:56
2.	"Never Ending Hill"	Diamond, Andy LaRocque	4:36
3.	"Is Anybody Here?"		4:12
4.	"Black of Night"	Diamond, LaRocque	4:00
5.	"Mirror, Mirror"		4:59
6.	"The Cellar"	Diamond, LaRocque	4:30
7.	"Pictures in Red"	Diamond, LaRocque	1:27
8.	"Give Me Your Soul"	Diamond, LaRocque	5:28
9.	"The Floating Head"	Diamond, LaRocque	4:46
10.	"Cold as Ice"		4:29
11.	"Shapes of Black"		4:22
12.	"The Girl in the Bloody Dress"		5:07
13.	"Moving On"		4:06

== Personnel ==
- King Diamond - vocals, keyboards
- Andy LaRocque - guitars, keyboards
- Mike Wead - guitars
- Hal Patino - bass
- Matt Thompson - drums
- Livia Zita - additional vocals

== Charts ==
Chart performance for Give Me Your Soul Please
Chart (2007)	Peak position
Finnish Albums (Suomen virallinen lista)	25
Swedish Albums (Sverigetopplistan)	28
