= Emission Phase =

Studio album by Detonation
- Released: April 30, 2007
- Recorded: January 2007
- Genre: Melodic death metal
- Length: 49:22
- Label: Osmose Productions
- Producer: Jochem Jacobs; Bouke Visser

Detonation chronology
Portals to Uphobia (2005)	Emission Phase (2007)	Reprisal (2010)

Emission Phase is the third full-length studio album by the band Detonation and was released by the French label Osmose Productions. The artwork was made by Eliran Kantor.

== Track listing ==
1. "Invoking the Impact" − 4:07
2. "When Stone Turns to Ash" − 4:53
3. "Craven Ablaze" − 4:14
4. "Chokedamp" − 5:34
5. "Defects of the Isolated Mind" − 4:17
6. "Modulate" − 3:54
7. "Into the Emission Phase" − 5:30
8. "Infected" − 3:52
9. "2nd Sun Ascending (instrumental)" − 1:57
10. "Soul Severance" − 3:53
11. "Reborn from the Radiance" − 4:38
12. "Fallout (instrumental)" − 2:33

== Credits ==
=== Band members ===
- Koen Romeijn − Vocals, Guitar
- Mike Ferguson − Guitar, Backing vocals on "Infected"
- Thomas Kalksma − Drums, Backing vocals
- Otto Schimmelpenninck − Bass guitar

=== Other ===
- Eliran Kantor − Cover Artwork
