= Kraptor =

Venezuelan thrash metal band

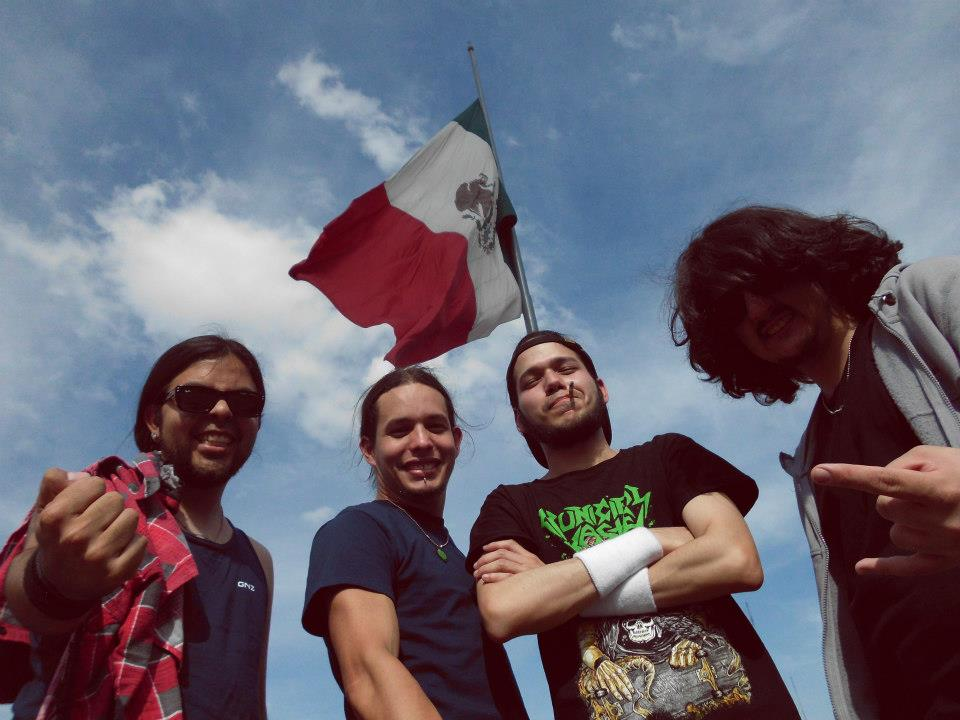
- Kraptor in Mexico in 2012

Background information
- Origin: San Cristóbal, Venezuela
- Genre: Thrash metal
- Years active: 2007–2021
- Labels: Violent Solution (EU); Cadaver (MX); Chainsaw Distro (EU); Faminttus (BR)
- Members: Phill Alvarez; Eddie Cañizares; Angel Moreno; Jessy Jaimes
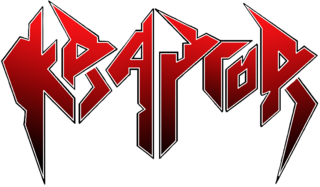

Kraptor is a thrash metal band from San Cristóbal, Venezuela.

== History ==
Formed in 2007 in San Cristóbal by Felipe "Phill" Alvarez and Jessy Jaimes, who were later joined by Angel Moreno and Edward Cañizares.

In 2010, Kraptor opened Monsters of Rock in Maracay, Venezuela, with German band Tankard.

After four years in the underground, the band signed with Mexican label Cadaver Productions, and released their debut EP, Fucking Liar.

They shared stages with national and international bands such as Violator (Brazil), Tungsteno (Argentina), Pendejo (Netherlands), Tankard (Germany), Yaotl Mictlan (United States), Intoxxxicated, Inquisidor, Brain Wash, Anabantha (Mexico), Natastor, Krueger, Blasphemy Moshpit (Venezuela), Legacy, Hedor, Patazera, Terminal War, Guerra Total, Enemy, War thrashed, Cuentos de los Hermanos Grind (Colombia), among others.

In 2012, they released their first studio album, Night of the Living Dead, on Cadaver Productions. This album contains guest vocals from Pedro Poney of Brazilian band Violator and Rick Rangel of American band Fueled by Fire.

In August 2012, they toured Mexico on the Kraptor's Undead Chronicles Tour Mexico 2012, visiting the main cities of the country.

Later in 2012, Kraptor supported Violator at Metal Warrior Fest VI, in Bogotá, Colombia.

In late 2012, record label Melomaniac Metalmedia Records awarded Kraptor "Best Revelation Band" in the Premios Melomaniac for that year in Caracas, Venezuela.

For May 2013, the band signed with Greek label Chainsaw Distro and announced the release of their album Night of the Living Dead on a new European version under this label.

In mid-2013, the band released a split called N.F.T.F.T. (New Forces Together for Thrash) with Brazilian thrash metal band Angry. This album was made in São Paulo under the label Faminttus Records.

For June 2015, Kraptor plays beside Violator from (Brazil) and Tungsteno from (Argentina) in the city of Bogotá, Colombia; at the music festival Bogothrash Festival Open Air in their third edition, made for first time with the "open air format" to this stage.

== Musical style ==
The Moshville Times described the group's sound as "pure, simple and old school [thrash]. No tweeks, changes or attempts to come up with a new sub-genre. Just lovely fast riffs, pounding beats and sneering vocals", and compared them to German band Sodom.

== Band members ==
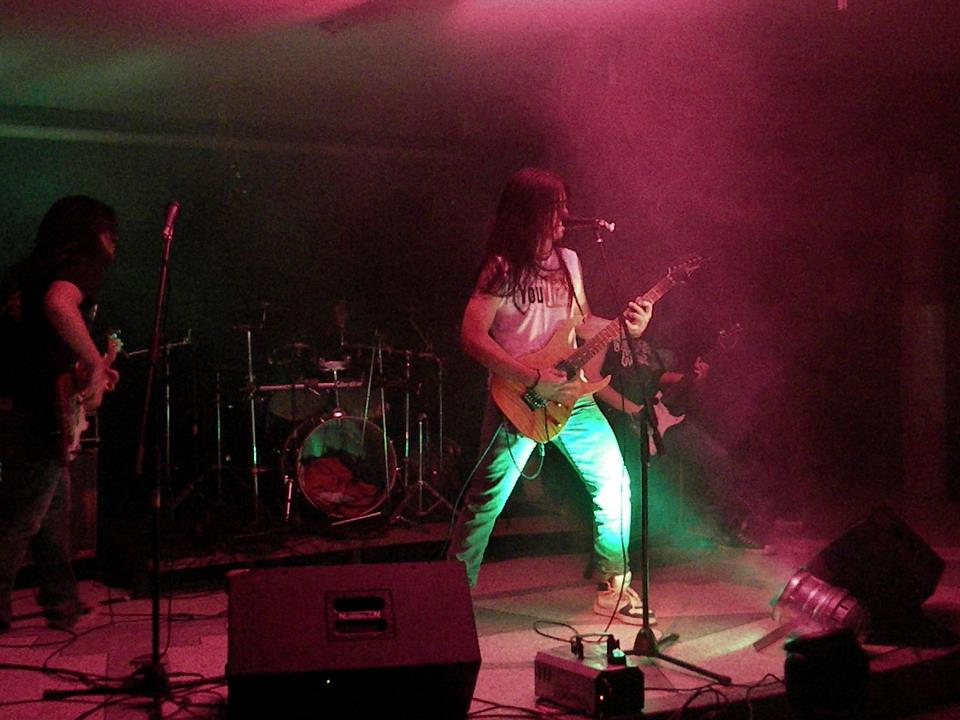
Kraptor performing in 2011

- Phill Alvarez – vocals, guitar
- Angel Moreno – guitar
- Eddie Cañizares – bass
- Jessy Jaimes – drums

=== Past members ===
- Leo Yañez – guitar
- Andres Calafat – bass
- Angel Moreno – guitar
- Jessy Jaimes – drums

== Discography ==
=== Studio releases ===
| Release date | Title | Label |
|---|---|---|
| 2011 | Fucking Liar (EP) | Cadaver Productions |
| 2012 | Night of the Living Dead | Cadaver Productions |
| 2013 | N.F.T.F.T. (New Forces Together for Thrash), Kraptor & Angry (split) | Faminttus Records |
