= Car Bomb (band) =

American mathcore band

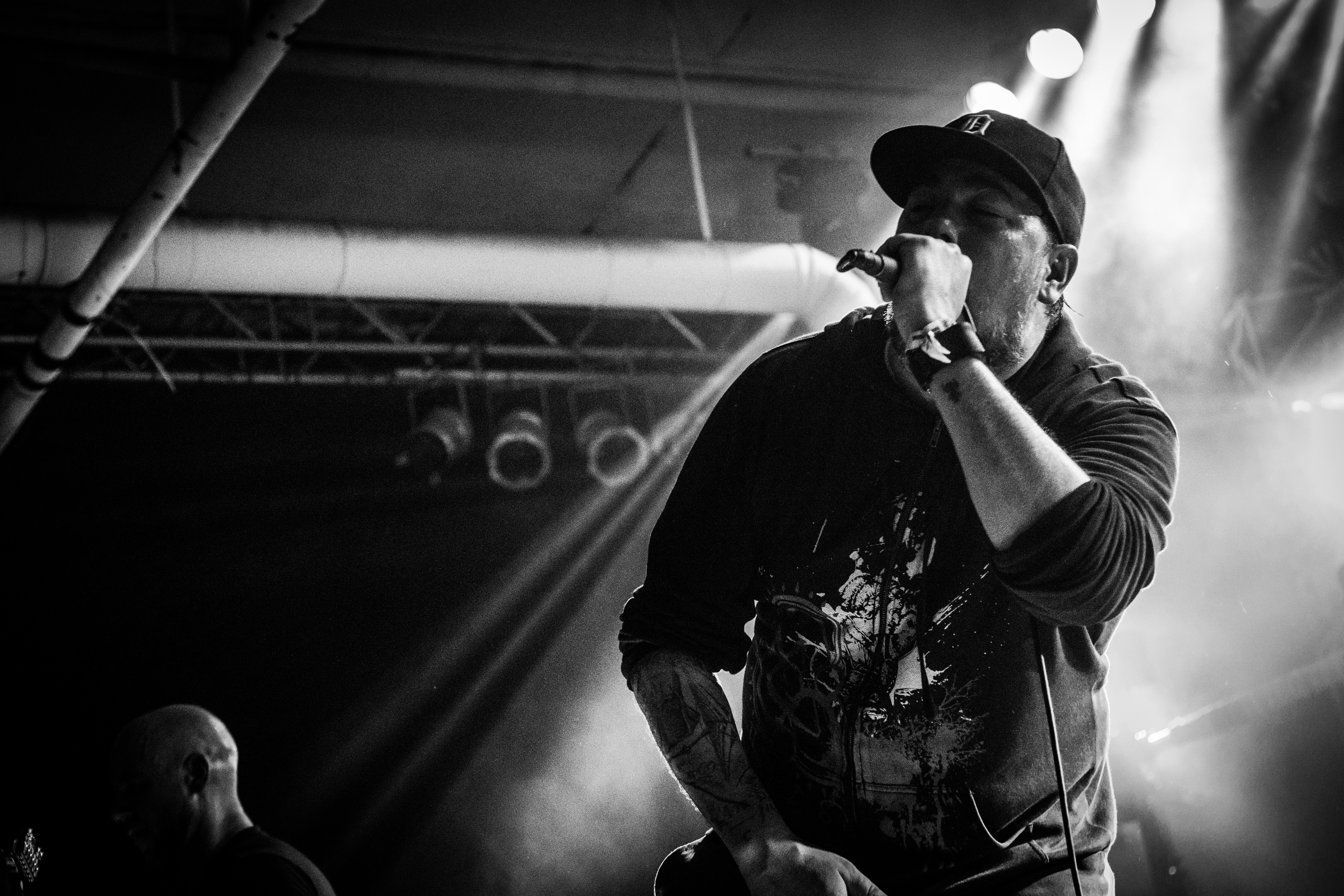
- Car Bomb at Euroblast Festival 2017

Background information
- Origin: Rockville Centre, New York, U.S.
- Genres: Mathcore; djent
- Years active: 2000–present
- Labels: Relapse, Holy Roar Records
- Members: Michael Dafferner; Elliot Hoffman; Greg Kubacki; Jon Modell
- Website: carbombcult.com

Car Bomb (sometimes stylized as [Car_Bomb]) is an American mathcore band from Rockville Centre, New York that was initially formed in 2000. Their debut album, Centralia, was released through Relapse Records on February 6, 2007.

== History ==
Car Bomb first came to be around the year 2000, when Bushwick residents Greg Kubacki and Michael Dafferner of the band Neck shared a rehearsal space under a Rockville Centre, New York butcher with Elliot Hoffman and Jon Modell of the band Spooge. Over time, the bands became great friends and frequently visited each other's practices. In 2002, Modell, previously a touring bassist for Soilent Green, unsatisfied with the music his band was making, recruited Kubacki and Dafferner to form a side project called Car Bomb.

The band released a three track demo in 2004 which featured early versions of songs "Rid", "M^6" and "His Eyes". Car Bomb collaborated with a split 7-inch with Burnt by the Sun in 2007, featuring the track "Pieces of You". Their first full-length album Centralia was released on February 6, 2007, via Relapse Records. In 2011, the band was dropped from the Relapse Records label and their subsequent albums were independently released through Bandcamp. According to Doug Moore, writing for Invisible Oranges, "Each member [of the band] works a technologically-inclined professional day job, which restricts their schedules but offers them uncommon financial resources. Some bands build their own studios; Car Bomb built their own microphones from scratch." In addition to buying or making equipment to create their own studio, this means that the band does not depend on the resources of a record label to finance recordings and production costs.

Car Bomb showcased a number of new songs from w^w^^w^w on their May 2009 tour with Gojira and The Chariot, viewable on YouTube.

Singer Michael Dafferner premiered his first independently released film [Why_You_Do_This], a feature-length documentary about "money, touring, and technical metal", at the Queen's World Film Festival in August 2011. The band's New York rehearsal space was flooded in early 2012, with most of the equipment being lost or damaged.

The band released their second full-length album w^w^^w^w in 2012, featuring a guest vocal appearance from Joseph Duplantier of the band Gojira. w^w^^w^w is officially pronounced "w click w", but guitarist Greg Kubacki mentioned "a lot of people are now calling it the 'waveform record,' which works too."

In September 2016, the band released a new track "From the Dust of This Planet" on Bandcamp from their forthcoming album Meta. Through October, the band previewed the tracks "Gratitude" and "Sets", and the video for "Black Blood". Meta was released on October 28, 2016. Duplantier had a guest vocal appearance for the second Car Bomb album in a row, and Frank Mullen from Suffocation joined the band in the studio for the first time.

The band accompanied the release with gigs starting with Gojira and the Dillinger Escape Plan in November 2016, and followed with a world tour including the US, Europe, and the UK supporting Gojira in early 2017.

The album Mordial was released on September 27, 2019. It was recorded at Silvercord Studios, written/produced by Greg Kubacki and mixed by Adam "Nolly" Getgood (Periphery, Devin Townsend, Animals as Leaders). The first single off the album, "Dissect Yourself", was released on May 30, 2019. Two other singles were released prior to the release of the full album: "Scattered Sprites" and "HeLa".

The band headlined their own European tour starting in September 2019, before returning to the US in October to support Periphery and Animals as Leaders.

== Musical style ==
Car Bomb's style is marked by an experimental and extremely aggressive approach to metal. Describing a 2014 Car Bomb performance supporting Meshuggah, Amit Sharma of Kerrang! said of the band: "Long Island experimentalists Car Bomb sound absolutely ferocious. Their psychotic turbo-thrash is disgustingly disorientating, 'Frankensteining' Meshuggah and The Dillinger Escape Plan into one relentless onslaught of time-chopping violence."

== Band members ==
- Michael Dafferner – vocals (2000–present)
- Jon Modell – bass (2000–present)
- Greg Kubacki – guitar (2002–present)
- Elliot Hoffman – drums (2002–present)

Former members

- Mike Fortin – guitar (2000–2002)
- unknown name – drums (2000–2002)

== Discography ==
=== Studio albums ===
- Centralia (2007), Relapse Records
- w^w^^w^w (2012), independent
- Meta (2016), independent
- Mordial (2019), independent/Holy Roar Records

=== Live albums ===
- Live in Santa Cruz (2023), independent

=== Other releases ===
- Demo – Three Song Sampler (2004), independent
- Burnt by the Sun / Car Bomb Split 7″ (2007), Relapse Records
- Tiles Whisper Dreams (2025), independent
