= Anterior (band) =

British heavy metal band

- Origin: Tredegar, South Wales, Wales
- Genres: Melodic death metal,thrash metal,progressive metal
- Years active: 2003–2012
- Labels: Metal Blade
- Past members: Ross Andrews; Andrew Cairns; Luke Davies; Leon Kemp; Steven Nixon; James Britton; James Cook
- Website: www.myspace.com/Anterior

Anterior was a Welsh heavy metal band from Tredegar, Wales. They were signed to Metal Blade Records, although they were also approached by Manowar's Joey DeMaio. They released two albums through Metal Blade Records: This Age of Silence in 2007 and Echoes of the Fallen in 2011.

== History ==
Originally a four-piece band formed in 2003, Anterior began playing covers of the bands that inspired them to play and immediately adopted a serious approach to music. After realizing their combined potential they started to compose their own music and style and set out to record a demo of their first original songs. They completed the self-funded disc in just a few days in the summer of 2004 and started sending copies to local promoters in search of shows.

The demo gained the band many shows in the area and many promoters had great interest in their music. Still playing their very first songs and selling their demo at shows, they landed an opening slot for DragonForce, which spurred on further shows. Soon after, Anterior were playing alongside bands such as The Black Dahlia Murder, Himsa, and 3 Inches Of Blood. As the band continued growing they started writing new material with the goal of recording a studio quality disc. When the new material was ready Anterior headed to Sonic One studios with producer Tim Hamill to record their first real studio effort. They put two of the new songs on their MySpace page which attracted considerable attention. One of the managers offered Anterior a provisional period to work together on finding the band a record label. They received several offers from different labels over the period and finally signed a worldwide deal with Metal Blade Records. The band soon began to work on their debut album with producer Tim Hamill.

During the writing process, vocalist Luke Davies encountered medical problems forcing him to no longer be able to play guitar. During the recording all guitars were recorded by guitarist Leon Kemp, as Davies' condition was more permanent than the band had once thought. They overcame the complications and recorded 10 tracks, 9 being original songs and the tenth a Racer X cover. The album was named This Age of Silence. Just days after the album's completion the band were finishing their UK tour with 3 Inches of Blood. Anticipating the album release, Anterior continued to keep playing live with the help of a friend on rhythm guitar duties with Davies providing vocals.

In May 2007, bassist James Britton left the band for personal reasons, but re-joined the band in September 2007.

The band were sharing stages with bands such as As I Lay Dying and Sanctity. The album was released 12 June 2007 and they embarked on a UK tour with label mates The Black Dahlia Murder and The Ocean. The album was generally well received by various magazines such as Kerrang!, Metal Hammer and Rocksound, as well as online magazines "Room 13" and "Power Play".

With Davies still unable to play, the band were looking for a full-time guitarist to become an official part of the band. During many of their shows, Anterior had played with the Scottish metalcore band Mendeed many times and had a very close relationship with them. The summer of 2007 saw the breakup of Mendeed and the addition of their lead guitarist, Steven Nixon, completing the band as a new five-piece line up.

Throughout 2008, the band toured extensively. On 25 February 2008 they completed their five-day Indian tour where they headlined "AVALANCHE" – the rock show at Netaji Subhas University of Technology, New Delhi, with Dutch melodic thrash band Detonation and also performed at East Wind Festival. The band then embarked on a European tour with Himsa and DevilDriver. The band also supported Dying Fetus on a UK tour in June 2008. The band were also the sole support for the two UK/Ireland shows in June with Children Of Bodom on the 11th in Dublin and the 12th in Glasgow.

On 31 March 2008, it was announced that drummer Ross Andrews would be leaving the band to pursue an alternative career path once a suitable replacement could be found. However, he left at the end of 2008 before any replacement was arranged.

On 29 January 2009, it was announced through the band's Myspace, that a replacement drummer had been found in Andrew Cairns, and that he too would be contributing to the new album due some time in 2010.

On 4 February 2010, it was announced through the band's MySpace that another drummer had been announced by the name of James Cook to contribute to the new album.

On 26 August 2011, after much delay, Echoes of The Fallen was released.

On Monday, 30 January 2012, the band announced from their Facebook profile page that they would "call it a day", and they are no longer continuing as a band. Their last show was on 2 March 2012 in London, England.

== Discography ==
- This Age of Silence (2007)
- Echoes of the Fallen (2011)

== Band members ==
- Luke Davies – vocals (2003–2012)
- Leon Kemp – guitar (2003–2012)
- Steven Nixon – guitar (2007–2012)
- James Britton – bass (2003–2012)
- James Cook – drums (2010–2012)
- Ross Andrews – drums (2003–2008)
- Andrew Cairns – drums (2009–2010)

Timeline
