= 8 Foot Sativa =

New Zealand-based extreme metal band

- Origin: Auckland, Auckland Region, New Zealand
- Genres: Death metal Thrash metal Melodic death metal
- Years active: 1998 – present
- Labels: 8 Foot sativa ltd Intergalactic Records; Roadrunner Records; Black Mark Records
- Members: Justin Niessen; Nik Davies; Corey Friedlander; Gary Smith; Paul Lawrence
- Website: www.8footsativa.co.nz

8 Foot Sativa is a New Zealand–based extreme metal band formed in 1998. Their most famous single is their self-titled song, "8 Foot Sativa", which was number one on the M2 (a late night New Zealand music show) top 12 list for 12 weeks, and stayed on the chart for seven months. The band has toured and released albums internationally, and played alongside Fear Factory, Soulfly, Korn, Slipknot, System of a Down, Children of Bodom, Disturbed, Motörhead, Pungent Stench, Shihad and Corrosion of Conformity. 8 Foot Sativa are a household name in New Zealand.

== History ==
=== Early days (1998–2002) ===
8 Foot Sativa formed when Brent Fox and Gary Smith met at Massey High School in Auckland, New Zealand. They enjoyed metal music and played music together. Peter 'Speed' Young from Kelston Boys' High School joined the band as the drummer. 'Fat' Dave was on the bass guitar. In their early days, they were a cover band that played music by Pantera, Iron Maiden, Judas Priest, Sepultura, Limp Bizkit, Metallica, and Slayer.

'Fat' Dave often did not turn up to practices, so Fox moved from guitar to bass. The band met their next vocalist, Ari, at a music school, where he was training as a drummer. Ari was the first vocalist to write original songs for the band. He wrote "Fuel Set", "Kick It All Away" and "Engine", which appeared on the band's debut album.

During this time, the band met Justin 'Jackhammer' Niessen. According to Gary Smith: "He used to sneak into the gigs and we'd sneak him beers". After Ari left the band (the other members didn't see him for several years), Niessen became the new vocalist.

Niessen is known for occasionally collapsing on-stage due to the strain of his vocal performances, most notably during a performance of "Destined to be Dead" on a New Zealand music show, Space. NZMusician.com claims that these collapses were due to "shortage of breath attributed to a lack of vocal training".

=== Hate Made Me (2002) ===
In 2002, 8 Foot Sativa released their debut album, Hate Made Me, which later received gold status in New Zealand for selling over 7,500 copies Shortly after the release of Hate Made Me, Young left the band, reportedly citing 'musical differences'. Sinate drummer Sam Sheppard replaced him.

This album features arguably 8 Foot Sativa's most well-known song, the eponymous "8 Foot Sativa", which is a staple of their live shows. It appeared in an episode of Monster Garage.

=== Season For Assault (2003) ===
In 2003, 8 Foot Sativa released their second album, Season for Assault. It neared gold status in New Zealand. The album features the songs "Chelsea Smile" and "Season For Assault".

Niessen resigned from the band two weeks before they were set to fly to Sweden to record their third album. The singer position was vacant for two days before Sam Sheppard's brother (and fellow Sinate member), Matt Sheppard, became 8 Foot Sativa's new vocalist.

=== Breed The Pain (2005) ===
With a new vocalist, 8 Foot Sativa released their third album Breed the Pain in 2005. They recorded it at Studio Underground in Sweden. Matt Sheppard wrote or co-wrote six of the songs on the album. His girlfriend provided the artwork.

Matt and Sam Sheppard left 8 Foot Sativa after the Breed the Pain tour. They reformed their previous band, Sinate. They joined forces with 8 Foot Sativa's guitar technician, Sean Parkinson, and Antony "Colonel" Folwell from the band Reprobate.

Justin 'Jackhammer' Niessen toured with the band from 9 September until 17 September, playing a four-concert tour around New Zealand. This tour saw newcomers William Cleverdon and Corey Friedlander joining the band. For the tour, Niessen and the band played songs mainly from Hate Made Me and Season for Assault, the albums which Niessen performed on.

=== Poison of Ages (2007) ===
Ben Read, from New Zealand death metal band Ulcerate and formerly of hardcore band Kill Me Quickly, joined the band as the new vocalist. 8 Foot Sativa went back to Studio Underground in Sweden to record their fourth album, Poison of Ages. Corey Friedlander did not perform drums on the album. He would leave the band to focus on his other project, Final Eve. Steven Westerberg of Carnal Forge stepped in as a session musician. Jamie Saint Merat, also of Ulcerat, ultimately replaced Friedlander.

Poison of Ages was meant to be released on 8 May 2006, but it was postponed due to a breached contract. Ben Read stated on the official forum's that the album would not be released until the band could raise NZ$20,000. The album was released on 21 May 2007.

Several band members departed in the meantime. In October 2006, Brent Fox left the band, leaving Gary Smith as the only original member. Rommily Smith replaced Fox. Guitarist William Cleverdon, who had earlier taken a hiatus of several months, was forced to leave in January 2007 after he was required to undergo a series of surgeries on his left wrist and forearm. Christian Humphreys, a member of Rommily's other band, New Way Home, replaced Cleverdon

Ben Read and Gary Smith wrote the lyrics on Poison of Ages. The album was influenced by blackened death metal.

=== 2009 ===
Gary Smith returned from injury to rejoin the band. Jamie Saint Merat left the band to relocate with his other band, Ulcerate.

8 Foot Sativa, still working on a new unnamed album, released a new single called "Sleepwalkers." The controversial video to this single follows a calf from the farm to the freezing works showing it being killed, then chopped up by butchers, before being sold to a family in a supermarket. It does this in graphical disturbing way. It also shows pigs and chickens held in cages. A message at the end of the video states "Thousands of animals were harmed in the making of this video."

In July 2009, bassist Romilly Smith left the band. Steve Boag, of In Dread Response, took his spot. Before heading to the studio to record the new still unnamed album, 8 Foot Sativa tour New Zealand performing shows with In Dread Response, New Way Home, Bloodletting, The Rest Is Silence.., and other various local acts across New Zealand.

=== 2010 ===
In January 2010, 8 Foot Sativa went into hiatus due to the continued effects of Smith's injury. The remaining members formed a new band, The Mark of Man, while Smith continued his recovery.

=== 2011 ===
After a couple of years on hiatus, the social media connected fan base started talking and rumours began when the band's Facebook page was stripped back and saturated by their original theme and imagery, including "Dopeman," the band's mascot and logo seen in their early music videos, a Sativa plant pulling himself in and around war zones and heated political situations with his large leafy arms.

With the return of Justin "Jackhammer" Niessen and the addition of Nik Davies from Death Metal band Perditionist, the band released a greatest hits compilation entitled 10 Years of Sativa in 2012. This campaign saw the band touring right up until the recording and release of what would become The Shadow Masters.

=== The Shadow Masters (2013) ===
8 Foot Sativa entered Quicksand Studio in Christchurch, New Zealand in early 2013 to record their 5th studio album, The Shadow Masters. The line up for this album was:

- Vocals – Justin "Jackhammer" Niessen
- Drums – Corey Friedlander
- Guitar – Gary Smith
- Guitar – Nik Davies
- Bass – Brent Fox

Clint Murphy from Modern World Studio in the UK produced this album. The Shadow Masters was released on 30 August 2013.

=== Hate Re-Made Me (2015) ===
The line up consisted of the three original members plus Nik Davies and Corey Friedlander.

With Clint Murphy back on board, the less than $1000 produced HMM record got a complete re-amp as the band dropped 40k into studio time for a re-recording.

A recent interview with Nik Davies brought light upon the situation where he simply stated that "its there, we are proud of it and it will be released when we feel it's right to do so. 8 Foot Sativa will always exist, we're not going anywhere"

== Band personnel ==
=== Current ===
- Justin "Jackhammer" Niessen – vocals (2002–2003, 2005, since 2011)
- Corey Friedlander – drums (2005–2006, since 2009)
- Nik Davies – guitars (since 2011)
- Paul Jason Lawrence – Bass (since 2017)
- Gary Smith - Guitars (since 1999)

=== Former ===
- Peter "Speed" Young – drums (1998–2001)
- Sam Sheppard – drums (2001–2004)
- Matt Sheppard – vocals (2003–2004)
- Brent Fox – bass (1998–2006, 2012–2014, 2014–2015)
- Ben Read – vocals (2006–2009)

== Discography ==
=== Studio albums ===
- Hate Made Me (2002)
- Season for Assault (2003)
- Breed the Pain (2005)
- Poison of Ages (2007)
- Ten Years of Sativa (2012)
- The Shadow Masters (2013)

=== Tracks on various compilations ===
Date	Title	Label	Track(s) Featured
2003	Red Surf: Godzone Surfer's Soundtrack		Fuel Set from Hate Made Me
9 October 2003	The Locals Soundtrack	Locals Films	Believer from Hate Made Me
3 February 2005	The Axe Attack Volume 1	Intergalactic Records	Chelsea Smile from Season for Assault
2 May 2005	Crusty Demons X: A Decade of Dirt	Collision Records	I Live My Death from Breed the Pain
2013	10 Years of Sativa	Independent	
