= Centralia (album) =

Studio album by Car Bomb
- Released: February 6, 2007
- Recorded: 2006
- Genre: Mathcore
- Length: 31:54
- Label: Relapse

Car Bomb chronology
Centralia (2007)	w^w^^w^w (2012)

Professional ratings
Review scores
Source	Rating
About.com	link

Centralia is the debut studio album by the American mathcore band Car Bomb. This was the band's first full-length release following a 2004 demo; it is also the band's only release through Relapse Records.

The album's title was named after the town of Centralia, Pennsylvania, which was abandoned during an underground mine fire. The track's lyrical content and titles cover various topics: "Cielo Drive" (also known as "Bloodbath Orgy") was named after the road on which one of the infamous Manson Family spree-killings were committed (10050 Cielo Drive), "H5N1" is the medical abbreviation for the then-recent outbreak strain of Bird Flu, and "M^6" covers neglect of a mother.

== Reception ==
Critics praised the album's complex and ferocious rhythms. Keith Bergman, writing for Blabbermouth.net, argues in a highly positive 8/10 review that the album is "a lurching start-stop mélange of tempos that switch back and forth fast enough to give you whiplash, even more brutal for its lack of cohesion and unsettling, jittery rhythmic convulsions."

== Track listing ==
No.	Title	Length
1.	"Pieces of You"	2:58
2.	"Gum Under the Table"	3:27
3.	"Rid"	0:27
4.	"Cellophane Stiletto"	2:53
5.	"Best Intentions"	4:26
6.	"M^6"	2:15
7.	"His Eyes"	4:18
8.	"Hypnotic Worm"	3:19
9.	"Cielo Drive"	2:27
10.	"Solid Grey"	2:12
11.	"H5N1"	3:14

Japanese release included the song "Bra-C-Ket".

== Personnel ==
- Michael Dafferner – lead vocals
- Elliot Hoffman – drums
- Greg Kubacki – guitar
- Jon Modell – bass
