= Elementary (The End album) =

Studio album by The End
- Released: February 6, 2007
- Genre: Math rock, post-hardcore, alternative metal, metalcore
- Length: 51:04
- Label: Relapse

The End chronology
Within Dividia (2004)	Elementary (2007)

Elementary is the third and final album released by the Canadian band The End. This album is a departure from their mathcore sound present on their first two albums and is more rock-oriented, featuring lighter melodies and clean vocals mixed with growling.

Professional ratings
Review scores
Source	Rating
Metal Hammer	7/10 stars
somethingFM	link
Allmusic	3/5 stars

== Track listing ==
1. "Dangerous" - 6:08
2. "The Never Ever Aftermath" - 4:45
3. "Animals" - 3:26
4. "The Moth and I" - 5:29
5. "Throwing Stones" - 3:29
6. "My Abyss" - 4:50
7. "Awake?" - 3:43
8. "A Fell Wind" - 4:02
9. "In Distress" - 5:54
10. "And Always..." - 9:18
