= Poison of Ages =

Studio album by 8 Foot Sativa
- Released: May 21st 2007
- Recorded: Studio Underground, Sweden
- Genre: Death metal Thrash metal
- Length: 41:42
- Label: Self Released

8 Foot Sativa chronology
Breed The Pain (2005)	Poison of Ages (2007)	The Shadow Masters (2013)

Poison of Ages is an album by New Zealand metal band 8 Foot Sativa. The official release date was May 21, 2007.

A two-minute demo of 'For the Birds' could be found on their website 8footsativa.com. The band premiered 'For the Birds' in August 2006 at The Rack and Ruin bar in Napier. They also premiered 'Thumbs, Eye Sockets, Love' not long afterwards. The band played at least three of the songs live before they released Poison of Ages.

== Recording ==
8 Foot Sativa's drummer at the time, Corey Friedlander, was planned to play the drums for this album but was unable to perform to the standard required of the album's producer. Steven Westerberg from Carnal Forge ended up doing the drumming on this album. Petri Kuusisto, also from Carnal Forge, performed the guitar solos on the songs Crosses For Eyes and For The Birds.

On the Official Forums Ben Read, the lead vocalist, stated that due to a breached contract Poison of Ages would not be able to be released until the band put together NZD 20,000. He however promised that the album would be released at some stage.

== Track listing ==
1. Emancipate – 3:26
2. Thumbs, Eye-Sockets, Love – 4:36
3. We, the Termites – 3:20
4. Exeunt – 4:43
5. Crosses for Eyes – 4:48
6. Pirates & Capitalists – 6:06
7. The Great Western Cliff-Hanger – 4:55
8. For the Birds – 4:29
9. Napalm Existence – 5:13

== Credits ==
- Ben Read - Vocals
- Gary Smith - Guitar
- William Cleverdon - Guitar
- Brent Fox - Bass
- Steven Westerberg - Drums
