= Imperial Circus Dead Decadence =

Japanese doujin music group

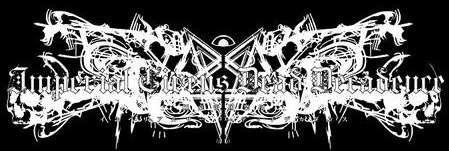

Background information
- Origin: Fukuoka, Japan
- Genres: Symphonic metal; melodic death metal; metalcore; deathcore; power metal; Doujin music
- Years active: 2007–present: Independent (2007-2025) Radtone Music
- Members: Akira Natsuki; Kohei Iyoda; Motoishi Hisayuki; Hull; Rib:Y(uhki); Kim; Shūhei Kamada
- Past members: Hellnear; Kimiko; Kylie; Tome; Emotional 6 Dirge Inferno; Shimo; Reino; Yuto Lizuka
- Website: www.icddecadence.com

Imperial Circus Dead Decadence is a Japanese heavy metal group formed in Fukuoka in 2007 mixing different styles of metal music genres including melodic death metal, symphonic metal and power metal.

== History ==
The doujin project was formed in 2007 in Fukuoka. After several line-up changes, the group now consists of female vocalist Akira Natsuki, male vocalist Rib:y(uhki), guitarists Kim and Kohei Iyoda, as well as drummer Shūhei Kamada and bassist Motoishi Hisayuki. Since Imperial Circus Dead Decadence's inception, they have been supported by other musicians such as Kimiko, vocalist of power metal band Bridear, and Shuhei, former musician of the visual kei band Asriel.

In 2008, the group self-released their debut album Sangeki no Chi ni Akaku Somatta Ai to Zetsubou no Kuroi Shi to ga Tsumugu Saigo no Monogatari. In 2010 and 2011, Imperial Circus Dead Decadence published their Haishita Shoujo wa, Haiyoru Konton to Kaikousu. EP and Kuruoshiku Saita Seisan na Mukuro wa Kanade, Itooshiku Saita Shoujo wa Seisan no Uta wo Utau. album, respectively. In 2014 and 2017, the group published their next two EPs, Yomi yori Kikoyu, Koukoku no Hi to Honoo no Shoujo. and Fushoku Ressentiment, Fushi Yoku no Sarugakuza..

In April 2022, Imperial Circus Dead Decadence announced they would release their third full-length album called MOGARI――Shi e Fukeru Omoi wa Rikujoku Sura Kurai, Kanata no Sei wo Aisuru Tame ni Inochi wo Tataeru――. on June 1, 2022. The album is their first full-length in 11 years. Despite being produced by an independent group, the album managed to rank at 61 in the Japanese Albums Chart.

In December of 2025, Imperial Circus Dead Decadence released the single called Yuuaku no Inori - Anima immortalis est. on December 7th, 2025. This single was different from their previously released EPs which teased upcoming songs in their 2022 release MOGARI――Shi e Fukeru Omoi wa Rikujoku Sura Kurai, Kanata no Sei wo Aisuru Tame ni Inochi wo Tataeru――. because of its usage in the osu! World Cup of 2025.

== Music ==
The music of Imperial Circus Dead Decadence is a mixture of different types of metal, including elements of melodic death metal, symphonic metal, and power metal, as well as metalcore and deathcore. In an album review on Angrymetalguy.com, Eldritch Elitist described the music as a death metal hybrid of Chthonic, the brutal symphonics of Fleshgod Apocalypse and the gothic dramatical touch of Cradle of Filth.

Many of the group’s songs reach lengths of eight minutes or more, and are entirely written in Japanese and a fictional language called Taihaisekai by the musicians. The lyrics tell a conceptional plot using eerie, dark fantastical themes.

== Discography ==
Studio albums

Year	Album details	Peak Oricon chart positions
2008	Sangeki no Chi ni Akaku Somatta Ai to Zetsubou no Kuroi Shi to ga Tsumugu Saigo no Monogatari: Released: December 30, 2008; Label: Independent; Format: CD, Download	—
2011	Kuruoshiku Saita Seisan na Mukuro wa Kanade, Itooshiku Saita Shoujo wa Seisan no Uta wo Utau.: Released: August 13, 2011; Label: Independent; Format: CD, Download	—
2022	MOGARI――Shi e Fukeru Omoi wa Rikujoku Sura Kurai, Kanata no Sei wo Aisuru Tame ni Inochi wo Tataeru――.: Released: June 1, 2022; Label: Radtone Music ((RADC-154)); Format: CD, Download	61

Extended Plays

Year	Album details	Peak Oricon chart positions
2010	Haishita Shoujo wa, Haiyoru Konton to Kaikousu.: Released: December 30, 2010; Label: Independent; Format: CD, Download	—
2014	Yomi yori Kikoyu, Koukoku no Hi to Honoo no Shoujo.: Released: December 28, 2014; Label: Independent; Format: CD, Download	—
2017	Fushoku Ressentiment, Fushi Yoku no Sarugakuza.: Released: December 31, 2017; Label: Independent; Format: CD, Download	—

Singles

Year	Track details	Peak Oricon chart positions
2025	Yuuaku no Inori - Anima immortalis est.: Released: December 7, 2025; Label: Independent; Format: Download	—
