= Benevolent (band) =

Experimental metal band

- Origin: founded in Kuwait; presently in United Arab Emirates
- Genres: Experimental metal, progressive metal
- Years active: 2007–present
- Members: Hadi Sarieddine; Fadi Sarieddine; Mohammed Gad
- Past members: Adel Al-Qattan; Bader Nana; Khalid Al-Mansour; Hisham Khalil
- Website: Benevolent's YouTube channel Benevolent's Facebook page Benevolent's Official Bandcamp page

Benevolent is an extreme/experimental metal band formed in 2007 by Lebanese brothers Hadi and Fadi Sarieddine. Formerly based in Kuwait, the band is now based in the United Arab Emirates.

== History ==
=== Formation and lineup changes (2007–2009) ===
Benevolent was founded by brothers Hadi Sarieddine and Fadi Sarieddine in May 2007 under the name Eminence. The band had initially started as a cover band. In 2008, the band released its first single titled "Solace".

In mid-2009, the band was joined by Adel Al-Qattan on guitars, and Bader Nana on drums. The band soon began writing original material. Soon after the release of "Augmented" in early 2010, Adel Al-Qattan and Bader Nana had departed from the band.

=== Recording Divided EP (December 2009–August 2010) ===
Benevolent entered the studio to begin work on record material for what has become the band's debut EP, titled Divided. "The Tyrant" was previously released as "Augmented" in late January, 2010.

The second single of the EP was the song "Haunting Shores". which showcased a new and more focused direction in the band's sound. Involving elements of poly rhythmic beats, low tuned guitars, and a general move toward what is referred to as djent.

The songs "Clairvoyant Transmission", "Purgatory", and "The Quantum Paradox" were all finalized toward the end of the recording process across the summer of 2010.

=== Divided EP ===
On November 5, 2010, the band released its debut EP titled Divided. The EP featured five songs including "Haunting Shores" and "The Tyrant".

Divided was released exclusively for free download on the band's Bandcamp page.

On January 10, 2011, Benevolent announced through their Facebook page that the line up of the band has been completed with the addition of Mohammed Gad on bass guitar. The band also confirmed their appearance in shows promoting Divided in February 2011 in the Middle East.

It was officially announced on the band's Official Facebook page that the band will return to the studio on May 27, 2011 to commence work on a single which will be released through the summer of 2011.

On July 10, 2011, Benevolent debuted their first official music video which features a guitar play-through of the song Clairvoyant Transmission. Hadi Sarieddine worked with the designer of the artwork from Divided as a director and producer for the video.

=== The Covenant and working with Andols Herrick ===
'The Covenant' is Benevolent's first full-length album, the record was released digitally on March 18, 2014 independently by the band. Andols Herrick (formerly of Chimaira) was announced as the guest drummer on the album.

== Discography ==
=== Divided EP (2010) ===
==== Track list ====
1. "Clairvoyant Transmission"
2. "Purgatory"
3. "The Tyrant"
4. "Haunting Shores"
5. "The Quantum Paradox"
- Co-produced, mixed, and engineered by Sajid "Sarj" Masoud at Sarj's Studio, Kuwait.
- Drums written by Hadi Sarieddine and Bader Nana, digitized by Sajid "Sarj" Masoud
- Guitars recorded by Hadi Sarieddine (Adel al-Qattan appears on "The Tyrant" and "The Quantum Paradox")
- Bass recorded by Hadi Sarieddine
- Vocals recorded by Fadi Sarieddine (growls, and cleans on "The Tyrant") and Hadi Sarieddine (cleans)
- Keyboards and pianos digitized and engineered by Hadi Sarieddine

=== The Covenant (2014) ===
==== Track list ====
1. "Void"
2. "Asphyxia"
3. "The Seeker"
4. "Radiate"
5. "Illusion"
6. "Heathen"
7. "The Collector"
8. "Dissipate"
9. "Metamorphosis"
10. "Ascension"
11. "Rebirth"
- Produced, mixed, and arranged by Hadi Sarieddine at Haven Studio
- Guitars recorded by Hadi Sarieddine and Mohammed Gad
- Bass recorded by Mohammed Gad
- Drums recorded by Andols Herrick at Studio D Productions
- Keyboards and pianos digitized and arranged by Hadi Sarieddine
- Mastered by Acle Kahney at 4D Sounds
- Album artwork by Edidong Udo

== Band members ==
=== Current members ===
- Hadi Sarieddine - guitar, clean vocals
- Fadi Sarieddine - growling
- Mohammed Gad - guitar, bass

=== Session members ===
- Prasad Jayaruwan - drums

=== Past members ===
- Adel al-Qattan - guitars
- Bader Nana - drums
- Khalid al-Mansour - drums
- Hisham Khalil - guitars
