= Mendeed =

Scottish heavy metal band

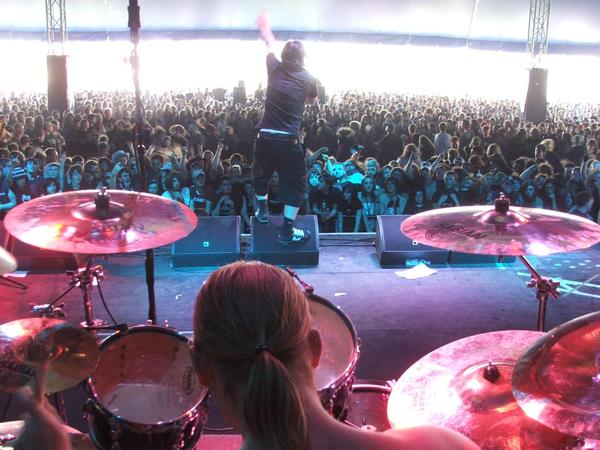
- Mendeed live at Download festival

Background information
- Origin: Dumbarton, Scotland
- Genre: Metalcore
- Years active: 2000–2007
- Labels: Rising Records; Nuclear Blast Records
- Members: Dave Proctor; Chris Lavery; Steven Nixon; Steph Gildea; Kevin Matthews

Mendeed were a Scottish heavy metal band formed in Dumbarton, in 2000 and disbanded in 2007.

== History ==
The band's members met at school in Dumbarton. In 2002, they self-released their first EP, Killing Something Beautiful. In 2003, the band released their second EP, As We Rise.

In December 2003, Mendeed signed with UK Label Rising Records. The band's first release on that label was the EP From Shadows Came Darkness in September 2004. The band toured, supporting DragonForce, Slipknot, Avenged Sevenfold, and Napalm Death.

In December 2004, the video "Ignite the Flames" was added to the playlists of MTV2 shows Headbangers Ball and 120 Minutes, and the catalogue of Scuzz TV.

Mendeed released their first album, This War Will Last Forever, in 2005 on Rising Records. In 2006, the album was rereleased by Nuclear Blast, at which point Mendeed were nominated for "Best Newcomer" at the Kerrang and Metal Hammer Awards. The band contributed to Kerrang's Remastered: Master of Puppets Revisited album, covering Metallica's "The Thing That Should Not Be". This earned them a Gold Disc at the Kerrang Awards in 2006.

They headlined their own tour in between dates supporting other bands, and performed on the Gibson/MySpace Stage at Download in 2006.

Their second album, The Dead Live By Love, was released in February 2007, recorded at Rising Studios. It debuted at no.4 in the British Rock charts.

The band split up in 2007. Lead guitarist Steve Nixon joined Welsh metalcore band Anterior. Drummer Kevin Matthews continued playing, joining Glasgow metal band Madman is Absolute, various studio sessions and producing other musicians.

Kevin was endorsed by Pearl Drums, Sabian Cymbałs, Remo skins & Vic Firth sticks.

== Band members ==
=== Final lineup ===
- Dave Proctor – vocals (2000–2007)
- Steve Nixon – lead guitar (2000–2007)
- Steph Gildea – rhythm guitar (2000–2007)
- Chris Lavery – bass (2000–2007)
- Kevin Matthews - drums (2000–2007)

== Discography ==
=== Albums ===
Year	Title	Label
2005	This War Will Last Forever	Rising / Nuclear Blast
2007	The Dead Live By Love	Rising / Nuclear Blast
2008	Shadows, War, Love: The Best of Mendeed	Rising / Nuclear Blast

=== EPs ===
Year	Title	Label
2002	MeNdEeD	Self-Released
2002	Killing Something Beautiful	Self-Released
2003	As We Rise	Self-Released
2004	From Shadows Came Darkness	Rising
2006	Positive Metal Attitude	Rising

=== Singles ===
Year	Title	Label
2004	Ignite the Flames	Rising
2005	Act of Sorrow	Rising
2005	Beneath a Burning Sky	Rising

=== Other ===
- "The Thing That Should Not Be" (Metallica Cover)

To celebrate the 20th anniversary of Metallica's Master of Puppets album in August 2006, Kerrang magazine selected Mendeed to contribute to a tribute album. They opted to record "The Thing That Should Not Be". The CD, titled Remastered: Master of Puppets Revisited, was given away free with the magazine. Other artists selected to cover songs on the album were Machine Head, Trivium, Bullet for My Valentine, Chimaira, Fightstar, Mastodon and Funeral for a Friend.
