= Vomitory (band) =

Swedish death metal band

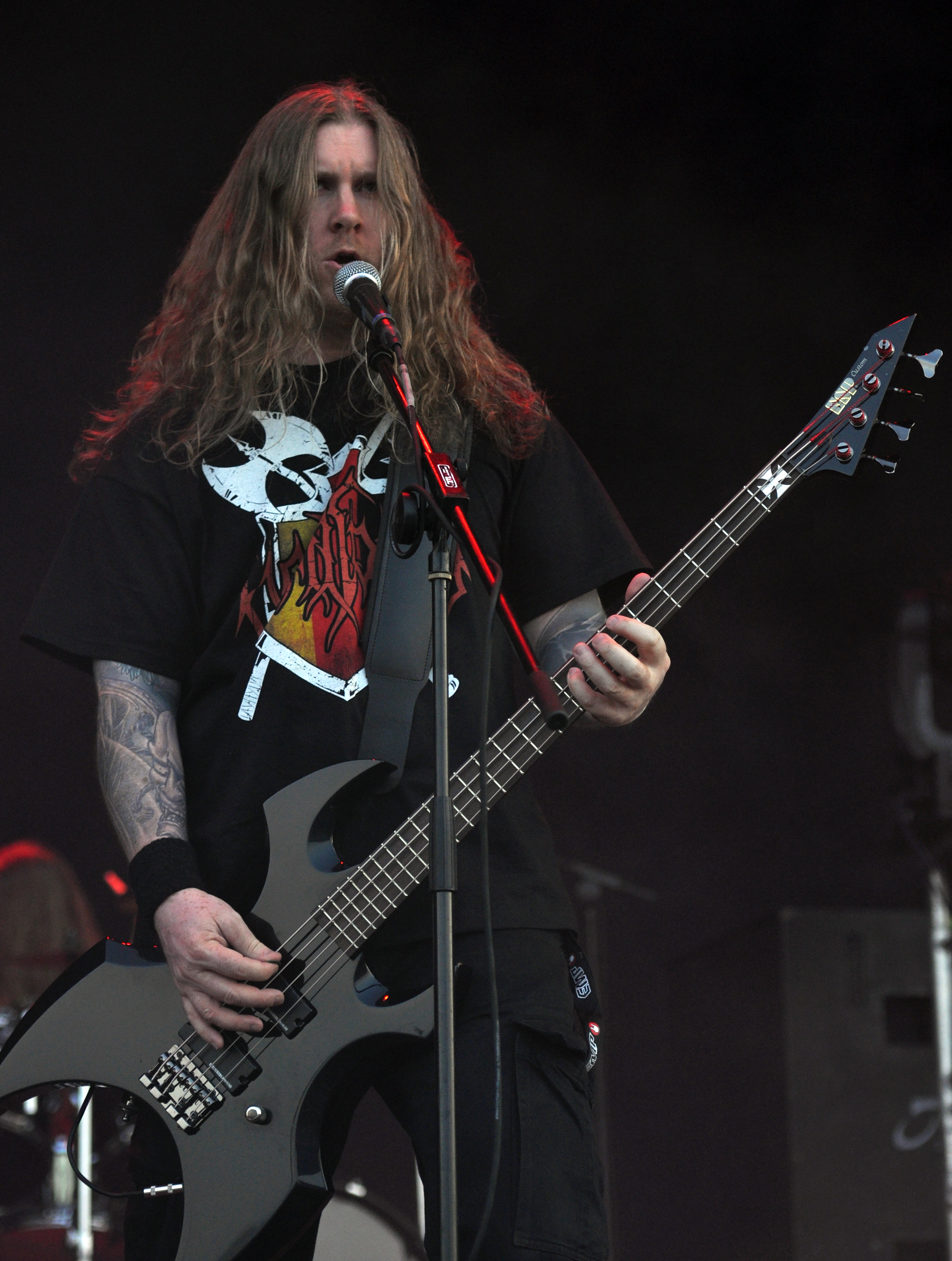
- Erik Rundqvist performing with Vomitory in 2013

Background information
- Origin: Forshaga, Sweden
- Genres: Death metal
- Years active: 1989–2013, 2017, 2018–present
- Label: Metal Blade
- Spinoffs: Cut Up
- Members: Urban Gustafsson; Tobias Gustafsson; Erik Rundqvist; Christian Fredriksson
- Past members: Ronnie Olson; Bengt Sund; Ulf Dalegren; Thomas Bergqvist; Jussi Linna; Peter Östlund
- Website: www.vomitory.net

Vomitory is a Swedish death metal band formed in 1989 by guitarist Urban Gustafsson and bassist Ronnie Olson. The band has released a total of ten albums, all released on Metal Blade Records. After breaking up in 2013 and reuniting for a one-off show in 2017, Vomitory officially reformed in 2018.

== History ==
The band formed in 1989, and initially played as a three-piece, comprising Urban Gustafsson, Ronnie Olson, and drummer Tobias Gustafsson. They soon added Bengt Sund on bass guitar, with Olson focusing on vocals. Ulf Dalegren joined on guitar in 1991. After releasing a demo, the band had their debut single, "Moribund", released by Swiss label Witchhunt Records.

Thomas Bergqvist replaced Sund on bass, and the band released their second demo in 1994. They were signed by Fadeless Records of the Netherlands, who released their debut album, Raped in Their Own Blood.

Vocalist Jussi Linna and bassist Erik Rundqvist replaced Olson and Bergqvist prior to the recording of the band's second album, Redemption, the first to be released in the United States when it was issued on the Pavement label.

The band signed to Metal Blade Records, who released their next two albums: Revelation Nausea (2001) and Blood Rapture (2002). Primal Massacre followed in 2004, the final release to feature guitarist Dalegren, who left in 2005, to be replaced by Peter Östlund.

The band released three further albums — Terrorize Brutalize Sodomize (2007), Carnage Euphoria (2009), and Opus Mortis VIII (2011).

In February 2013, Vomitory announced that it would be disbanding by the end of that year. The band's final show was on 27 December 2013. Rundqvist and Tobias Gustafsson went on to form Cut Up.

On 2 April 2018, after reuniting the year before for "one show to honor an old friend", Vomitory announced that they reformed and celebrated their 30th anniversary together in 2019. After another 2-year hiatus following the COVID-19 pandemic, the band announced a return to touring in June 2022.

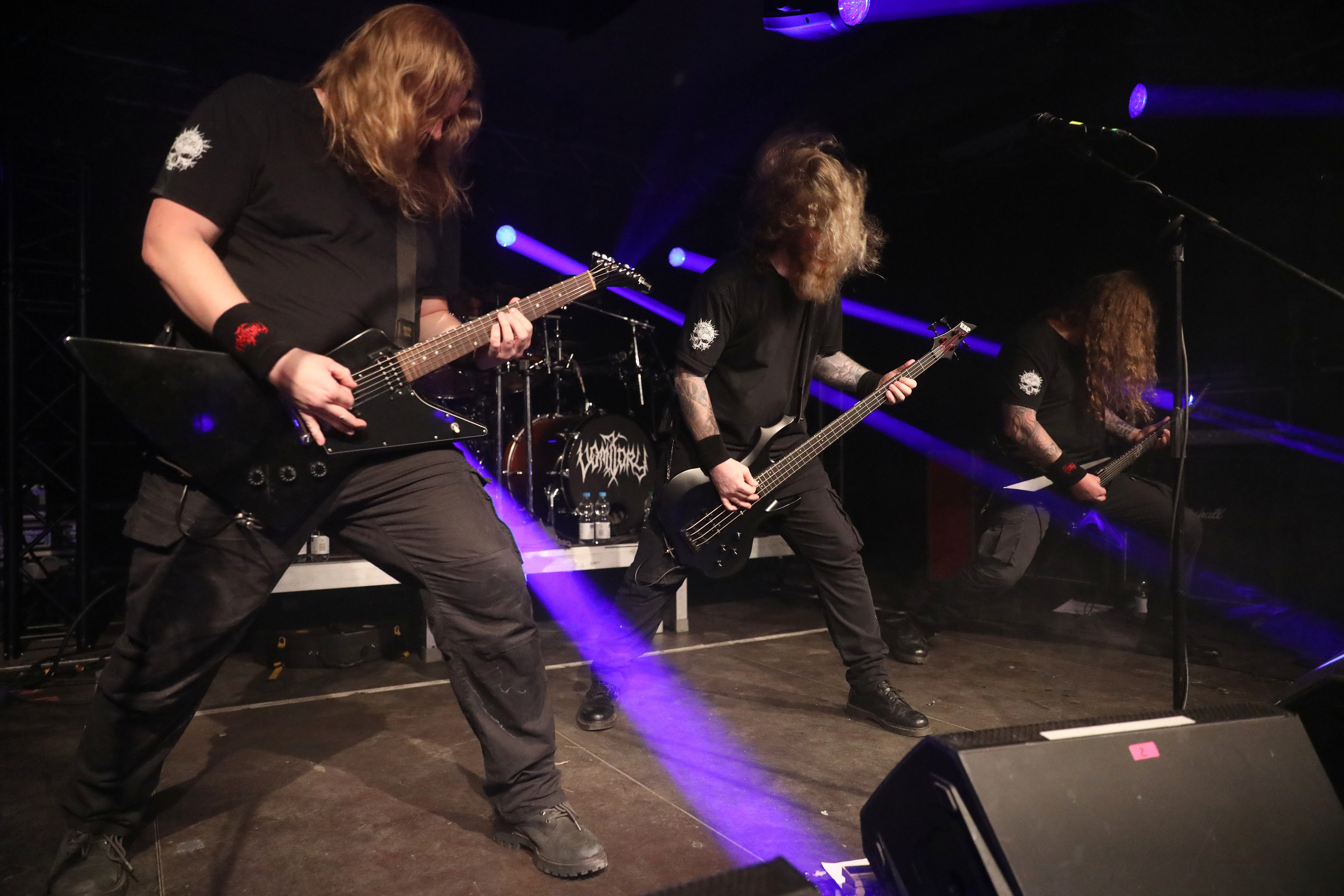
Vomitory in ORWOhaus in 2023

On 12 April 2023, the band announced their first album in 12 years, All Heads Are Gonna Roll, released on May 26.

== Members ==
=== Current members ===
- Urban Gustafsson – rhythm guitar (1989–2013, 2017, 2018–present)
- Tobias Gustafsson – drums (1989–2013, 2017, 2018–present)
- Erik Rundqvist – bass (1997–2013, 2017, 2018–present), vocals (1999–2013, 2017, 2018–present)
- Christian Fredriksson – lead guitar, backing vocals (2025–present; live 2023–2025)

=== Former members ===
- Bengt Sund – bass (1990–1993)
- Thomas Bergqvist – bass (1993–1996)
- Ronnie Olson – vocals (1989–1996), bass (1989–1990)
- Jussi Linna – vocals (1996–1999)
- Ulf Dalegren – lead guitar (1991–2005)
- Peter Östlund – lead guitar (2005–2013, 2017, 2018–2025)

=== Live musicians ===
- Danny Tunker – guitar (2012)
- Anders Bertilsson – guitar (2012–2013)

== Discography ==
=== Albums ===
- Raped in Their Own Blood (Metal Blade, 1996)
- Redemption (Metal Blade, 1999)
- Revelation Nausea (Metal Blade, 2001)
- Blood Rapture (Metal Blade, 2002)
- Primal Massacre (Metal Blade, 2004)
- Terrorize Brutalize Sodomize (Metal Blade, 2007)
- Carnage Euphoria (Metal Blade, 2009)
- Opus Mortis VIII (Metal Blade, 2011)
- All Heads Are Gonna Roll (Metal Blade, 2023)
- In Death Throes (Metal Blade, 2026)

=== Demos and rarities ===
- Vomitory demo (1992)
- Promo (1993)
- Moribund 7" (1993)
- Through Sepulchral Shadows (1994)
- Anniversary Picture Disc (1999)
