= The Game of Life (album) =

Studio album by Arsonists Get All the Girls
- Released: August 14, 2007
- Genre: Progressive deathcore
- Length: 38:27
- Label: Century Media
- Producer: Zack Ohren

Arsonists Get All the Girls chronology
Hits from the Bow (2006)	The Game of Life (2007)	Portals (2009)

Professional ratings
Review scores
Source	Rating
AllMusic	2.5/5 stars

The Game of Life is the second studio album by American deathcore band Arsonists Get All the Girls. The album was released on August 14, 2007. This is the last Arsonists Get All The Girls album to feature bassist Patrick Mason due to his death in November 2007 from alcohol poisoning.

A music video was produced for the song "Shoeshine for Neptune".

== Track listing ==
No.	Title	Length
1.	"Business in the Front" (instrumental)	1:14
2.	"Save the Castle, Screw the Princess"	5:11
3.	"Mantipede"	1:17
4.	"Cuffed to Your Ankles"	4:18
5.	"Shoeshine for Neptune"	2:52
6.	"To Get Eaten by the Rats"	0:47
7.	"Tourtasia"	3:47
8.	"Claiming Middle Age a Decade Early"	3:05
9.	"Taiwanese Troft Trouble"	3:30
10.	"Thirteen Year Old Ruby"	3:48
11.	"Robando de los Muertos"	4:45
12.	"So You Think You Know About the Game of Life (Party in the Rear)"	3:53

== Personnel ==
Arsonists Get All the Girls

- Cameron Reed – vocals, keyboards
- Remi Rodberg – vocals, keyboards
- Arthur Alvarez – guitar
- Patrick Mason – bass
- Nick Cardenelli – guitar
- Garin Rosen – drums

Additional musicians

- Jon Rosen – piano on "So You Think You Know About the Game of Life (Party in the Rear)"
- Derek Rydquist (ex The Taste of Blood / The Faceless) – guest vocals on "Robando de los Muertos"
- Taylor Young (Moria) – guest vocals on "Claiming Middle Age a Decade Early"
