= The End (Canadian band) =

Canadian metal band

- Origin: Mississauga, Ontario, Canada
- Genres: Mathcore; Metalcore; Math rock (later); Alternative metal (later)
- Years active: 1999–2007
- Label: Relapse
- Past members: Aaron Wolff; Steve Watson; Sean Dooley; Anthony Salajko; Tyler Semrick-Palmateer; Andrew Hercules
- Website: myspace.com/theendmusic

The End were a Canadian mathcore/metalcore band based in Mississauga, Ontario. Their sound has been compared to that of The Dillinger Escape Plan and deathgrind group Discordance Axis, as well as Neurosis.

== History ==
The End formed in 1999; band creation began with members; lead singer Tyler Semrick-Palmateer, guitarists Steve Watson and Andrew Hercules, bassist Sean Dooley, and percussionist Anthony Salajko.

The band's debut full-length album Transfer Trachea Reverberations from Point: False Omniscient was released in 2001, and won a Canadian independent music award for metal album of the year in 2002. The band then went on a summer tour in the US with The Abandoned Hearts Club, followed by a Canadian and US tour with Between the Buried and Me and Life Once Lost.

Their second album, Within Dividia was released in January, 2004 through Relapse Records. The band than toured Canada with The Abandoned Hearts Club again. Their third album, Elementary, was released on Relapse Records in February, 2007. The band made some changes in their musical style for this album, including some partially sung vocals and more melodic song structure. Their song "Throwing Stones" appeared on the soundtrack for the 2007 film The Hills Have Eyes 2.

The band has been dormant since 2008, with little information available as to what happened, though rumors spread that the sudden departure of guitarist Andrew Hercules in 2007 caused a rift within the band.

== Members ==
=== Last known lineup ===
- Aaron Wolff - vocals/percussion
- Steve Watson - guitar
- Sean Dooley - bass
- Anthony Salajko - drums
- Andrew Hercules - guitar, songwriter

=== Former ===
- Tyler Semrick-Palmateer - vocals

== Discography ==
Studio albums

- Transfer Trachea Reverberations from Point: False Omniscient (2002)
- Within Dividia (2004)
- Elementary (2007)

== Singles and music videos ==
- "Her (Inamorata)" (2002)
- "Throwing Stones" (2007)
