= Terrorize Brutalize Sodomize =

Studio album by Vomitory
- Released: April 20, 2007
- Recorded: 2006 at Leon Music Studio in Karlstad, Sweden
- Genre: Death metal
- Length: 41:10
- Label: Metal Blade
- Producer: Rikard Löfgren, Vomitory

Vomitory chronology
Primal Massacre (2004)	Terrorize Brutalize Sodomize (2007)	Carnage Euphoria (2009)

Professional ratings
Review scores
Source	Rating
About.com	4/5 stars
Allmusic	3.5/5 stars
Blabbermouth	8.5/10 stars
Metal Hammer	7/10 stars

Terrorize Brutalize Sodomize is the sixth album by Swedish death metal band Vomitory. It was released on April 20, 2007, on Metal Blade.

== Track listing ==
1. "Eternal Trail of Corpses" – 2:38
2. "Scavenging the Slaughtered" – 3:52
3. "Terrorize Brutalize Sodomize" – 3:44
4. "The Burning Black" – 5:23
5. "Defiled and Inferior" – 3:07
6. "March into Oblivion" – 4:50
7. "Whispers from the Dead" – 4:25
8. "Heresy" – 3:27
9. "Flesh Passion" – 4:19
10. "Cremation Ceremony" – 5:22

== Personnel ==
- Erik Rundqvist – bass guitar, vocals
- Tobias Gustafsson – drums
- Peter Östlund – guitar
- Urban Gustafsson – guitar
- Vomitory – production
- Rikard Löfgren – backing vocals on "Terrorize Brutalize Sodomize", production, engineering, mixing, mastering
- Henrik Hedlund – design, cover concept, photography, layout

== Release history ==
Terrorize Brutalize Sodomize was released on April 20, 2007, in Germany, Austria and Switzerland; on April 23, 2007, in the rest of Europe; and on May 1, 2007, in North America.
