= Impious =

Swedish thrash/death metal band

- Origin: Sweden
- Genres: Thrash metal, death metal, melodic death metal
- Years active: 1994–present
- Labels: Black Sun Records; Karmageddon Media; Metal Blade Records
- Members: Valle Adzic; Martin Åkesson; Robin Sörqvist; Mikael Norén; Erik Peterson
- Website: www.impious.net

Impious is a Swedish thrash/death metal band.

== History ==
Valle Adzic and Martin Åkesson formed Swedish thrash/death metal band Impious in April 1994. The band had difficulty finding a permanent drummer, so they used a session drummer. Shortly after, bassist Robin Sörqvist joined the band. Impious recorded their debut demo in the summer of 1995, called Infernal Predomination.

Shortly after the recording session, the session drummer quit the band. They hired another session drummer. In May 1996, the band recorded their second demo, The Suffering, at Los Angered Recording with Andy La Rocque.

Shortly after the recording, permanent drummer Ulf Johansson joined the band to complete the lineup. In the summer of 1997, Impious recorded their third demo, Promo '97. This demo was not released. At the same recording session, the band covered the Sepultura song "Inner Self" for the tribute album Sepulchral Feast. Promo '97 resulted in a record deal with Swedish label Black Sun Records, and in December 1997, Impious recorded their debut album, Evilized, in Sunlight Studios with producer Tomas Skogsberg. The album was released in the summer of 1998. In October 1998, the band entered Los Angered Recording to cover the Metallica song "One" for the tribute album Metal Militia III.

In January 2000, the band recorded their second album in Studio Mega with engineer Chris Silver. Black Sun took almost a year to release the album. In the summer of 2000, singer Åkesson quit the guitar to concentrate on vocals. Sörqvist switched from bass to lead guitar. Erik Peterson joined the band on bass.

In March 2001, Impious recorded a four-song promo in Studio Mega and sent it to different labels to get a new deal. Impious signed with Hammerheart Records.

In February 2002, drummer Ulf Johansson left the band five weeks before recording a new album. Impious hired in Mikael Norén, who quickly learned 10 songs for the album. In March 2002, the band recorded their third album, The Killer, at Studio Mega with Chris Silver. An MCD was recorded later that year, including "The Deathsquad" from the album The Killer, plus a re-recorded version of "Extreme Pestilence" from Evilized, plus three covers from Metallica, Running Wild and Mötley Crüe, along with two songs from their Promo 2001. This MCD was released in January 2003 when the band went on a European tour with Necrophobic and Satariel.

In February 2004, Impious paid respect to death metal pioneers Possessed on the tribute album Seven Gates of Horror with bands such as Cannibal Corpse, Sadistic Intent, Vader, Sinister, Angel Corpse and Amon Amarth. Also in February 2004, Impious signed a worldwide deal with Metal Blade Records.

The band released its fourth studio album, Hellucinate, in October 2004 via Metal Blade Records.

== Line-up ==
- Valle Adzic – guitar
- Martin Åkesson – vocals
- Robin Sörqvist – lead guitar
- Mikael Norén – drums
- Erik Peterson – bass

== Discography ==
- Infernal Predomination (Demo) – 1995
- Let There Be Darkness (Demo) – 1995
- The Suffering – 1996
- Evilized – 1998
- Terror Succeeds – 2000
- The Killer – 2002
- The Deathsquad EP – 2002
- Hellucinate – 2004
- Born To Suffer (Compilation) – 2004
- Holy Murder Masquerade – 2007
- Death Domination – 2009
