= Detonation (band) =

Dutch death metal band

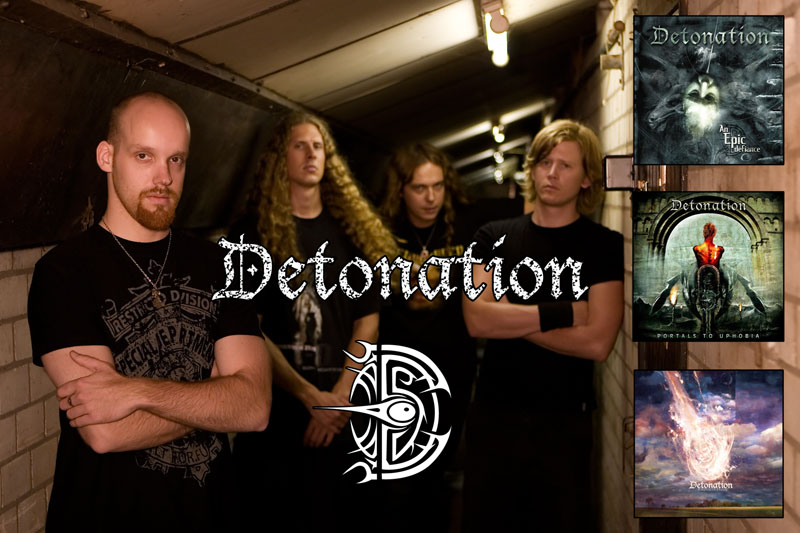

Background information
- Also known as: Infernal Dream (1997–1998)
- Origin: Utrecht, Netherlands
- Genres: Death metal, melodic death metal, thrash metal (early)
- Years active: 1997–2012, 2013-present
- Label: Osmose
- Members: Koen Romeijn; Mike Ferguson Mike Hill; Otto Schimmelpenninck van der Oije; Matthieu Boer
- Past members: Fedor Tieleman; Thomas Kalksma
- Website: detonation.nl

Detonation is a Dutch death metal band with members from the Netherlands and the United States. In recent years, the band has moved towards a less thrashy melodic death metal sound.

== History ==
Detonation was founded in 1997 as Infernal Dream. The band started with Koen Romeijn on vocals/guitar, Mike Ferguson on guitar, and Thomas Kalksma on drums. In August 1998, bassist Otto Schimmelpenninck van der Oije joined the band. The band renamed to Detonation in 1998 and entered a studio to record two songs for the Crushed Skull Compilation Volume 1 CD. A month later, Detonation performed live for the first time. The Crushed Skull compilation was released in January 1999 through Skull Crusher Records.

In October of that same year, the band entered the studio to record the four-song MCD Lost Euphoria, released in January 2000 through Skull Crusher Records. After the release, Detonation played ten shows as the supporting act for the Dutch metal band Orphanage.

In March 2001, Detonation entered the studio to record three new songs to be released as a promo CD for labels and venues. After playing numerous shows, which included Detonation's first show outside The Netherlands (Open Hell Fest in the Czech Republic), the band recorded their debut studio album, An Epic Defiance. The 12-song album was recorded within two weeks at Studio Excess. The artwork was done by Niklas Sundin (Dark Tranquillity) for Cabin Fever Media.

On 19 October 2002, An Epic Defiance was self-released and sent to record labels. The album caught the attention of French record label Osmose Productions, and Detonation signed a three-album contract. An Epic Defiance was officially re-released worldwide on CD and limited LP on 19 June 2003. In July 2003, Detonation completed their first foreign tour, playing three shows throughout England. After promoting the album in the Netherlands, the band headed to the UK to complete a ten-day tour throughout the country.

In February 2004, Detonation took part in a thirteen-day European tour as a support act for Dimension Zero along with Immemorial. In August 2004, the band recruited Fedor Tieleman of the Dutch band M-90's as a session drummer due to an arm injury that Kalksma sustained.

In December 2004, Detonation entered Excess Studios to record their second studio album, Portals to Uphobia. Due to numerous problems, the official release date was delayed until 12 September 2005. Detonation toured with Decapitated, Gorerotted, and Dam. Over 30 shows were scheduled throughout Europe, but due to a breakdown of the rented tour bus, Detonation had to cancel several shows. The band completed about half of the shows with their own transportation.

In January 2007, Detonation recorded their third studio album, Emission Phase, released at the end of April 2007. The artwork was made by Eliran Kantor and the production was taken care of by Bouke Visser and Jochem Jacobs from Split Second Sound. The release was promoted by an eight-day tour throughout the UK and several individual shows (festival) in the Netherlands.

On 17 March 2008, the band announced their first line-up change. Koen Romeijn who had been playing rhythmic guitar/vocals since 1997 decided to focus on vocals. He was replaced with Danny Tunker from Fuelblooded and The Saturnine.

On 3 May 2008, Detonation announced that drummer and founding member Kalksma left the band because of differences of opinion about the future of Detonation. He left in good terms and mentioned that he would continue his drumming career.

In November 2008, Michiel van der Plicht joined the band as the permanent new drummer, after doing a couple of shows as session member. At the end of 2011, the band recorded their fourth studio effort, Reprisal, produced by Harry van Breda. It was released in April 2011. Before the album was released, Michiel van der Plicht, Danny Tunker and Otto Schimmelpenninck van der Oije left the band to focus on their other bands (God Dethroned and Delain, respectively). Harry van Breda filled out as bass guitar player while Allard van der Kuip joined as drummer.

In 2012, the band announced a hiatus for an undetermined period of time, but reformed in 2013 with an original bassist and a new drummer.

== Line-up ==
=== Current members ===
- Koen Romeijn – vocals, rhythm guitar (1997–2012, 2013–present)
- Mike van den Heuvel (Hill) - vocals 2025-present
- Mike Ferguson – lead guitar (1997–2012, 2013–present)
- Otto Schimmelpenninck van der Oije – bass (1998–2011, 2013–present)
- Matthieu Boer – drums (2013–present)

=== Session members ===
- Fedor Tieleman – drums (2004)

=== Former members ===
- Thomas Kalksma – drums (1997–2008)
- Danny Tunker – rhythm guitar (2008–2011)
- Michiel van der Plicht – drums (2008–2011)
- Harry van Breda – bass (2011–2012)
- Allard van der Kuip – drums (2011–2012; died 2021)

== Discography ==
=== Studio albums ===
- An Epic Defiance (2002, re-released in 2003)
- Portals to Uphobia (2005)
- Emission Phase (2007)
- Reprisal (2010)

=== Other releases ===
- Crushed Skull Volume 1 (compilation, 1999)
- Lost Euphoria (MCD, 2000)
- Promo 2001 (promo CD, 2001)
