= Summer Breeze Open Air =

Annual German heavy metal music festival

- Genre: Heavy metal, extreme metal, hardcore punk
- Dates: Summer
- Locations: Dinkelsbühl, Germany
- Years active: 1997–present
- Website: www.summer-breeze.de

Summer Breeze Open Air is an annual German heavy metal music festival. It was first held in 1997. The festival had been held in Abtsgmünd until 2006 when it was moved to its new location of Dinkelsbühl, Bavaria. The festival draws around 40,000 attendees annually.

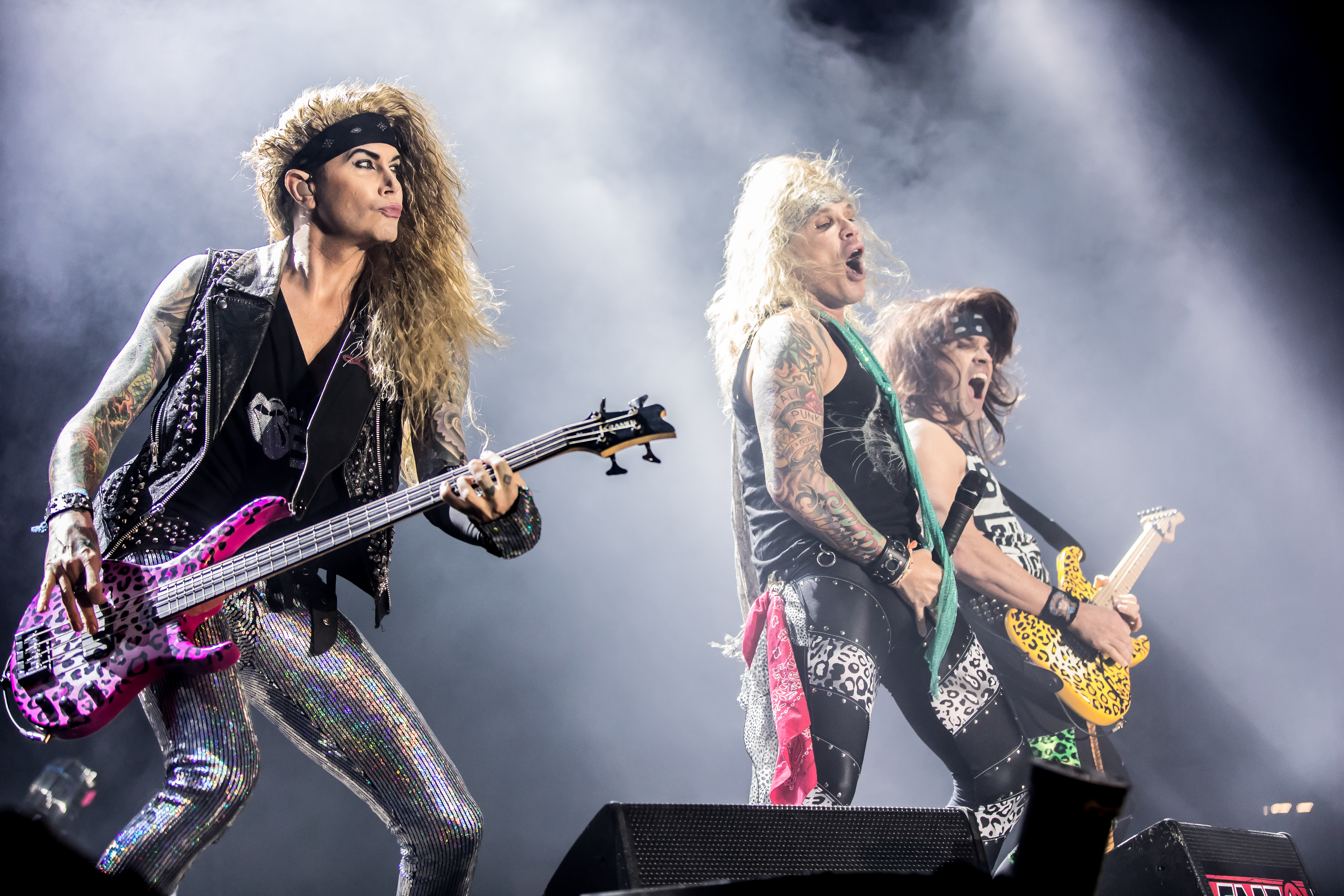
Steel Panther live at Summer Breeze 2016

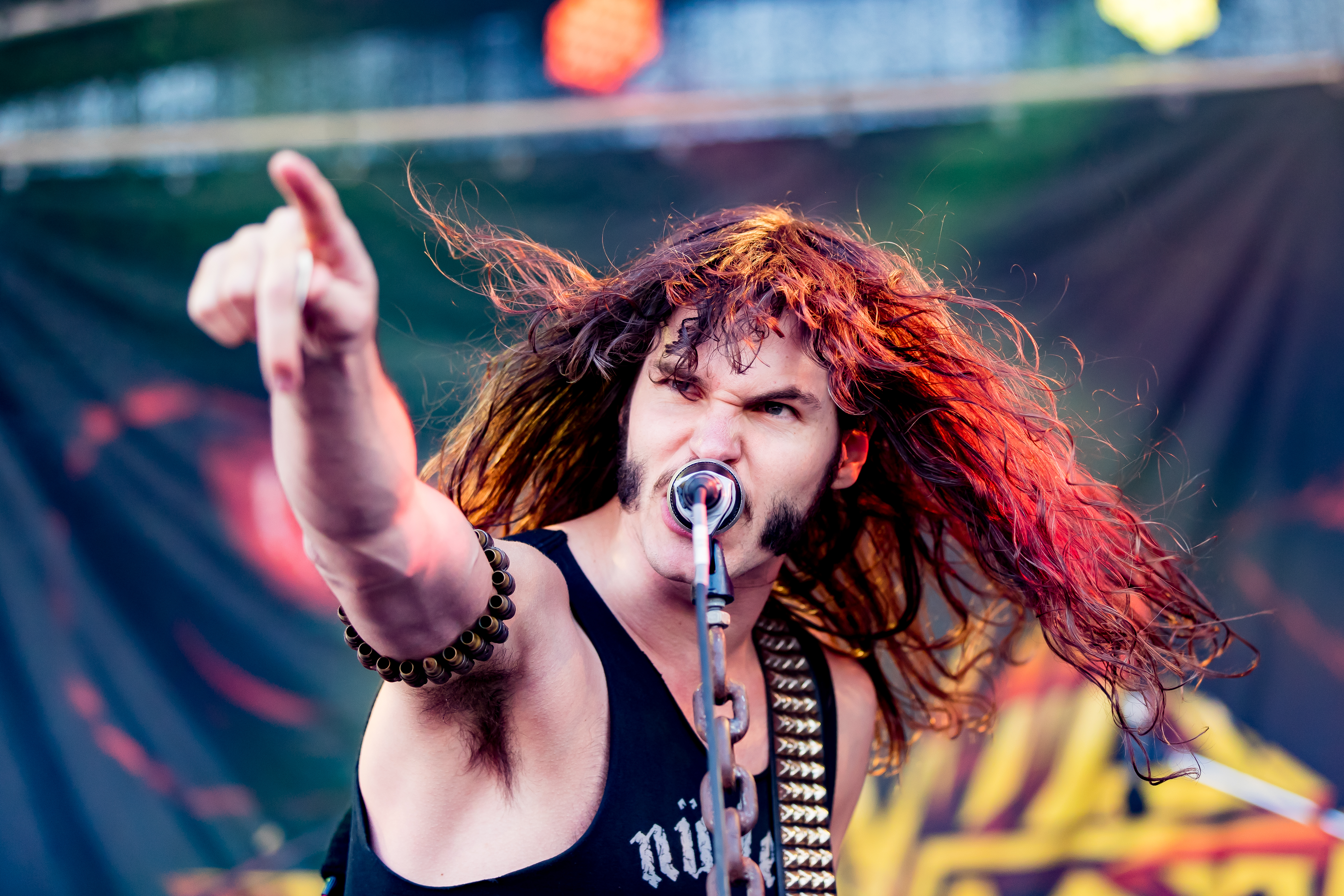
Evil Invaders live at Summer Breeze 2016

== Lineup history ==
=== 2004 ===
Summer Breeze Open Air 2004 was held from Thursday, 19 August to Saturday, 21 August.

Lineup
Thursday	Friday	Saturday
Crematory; Fleshcrawl; Fragments of Unbecoming; Goddess of Desire; Gorerotted; Hypocrisy; Lake of Tears; Lords of Decadence; Mörk Gryning; Rawhead Rexx; Saltatio Mortis; Sentenced; Sonata Arctica; Vomitory	Alev; Beseech; Criminal; Dark Fortress; Die Happy; Evergrey; Green Carnation; Katatonia; Leaves' Eyes; Mental Amputation; Mercenary; Sirenia; Six Feet Under; Sleepingodslie; Sodom; Tankard; Vintersorg; Xandria	Brainstorm; Busta Hoota; Cataract; Danzig; Deadsoul Tribe; Disillusion; Ensiferum; Equilibrium; Finntroll; Hatesphere; Honigdieb; Immortal Rites; Mnemic; Paragon; Primordial; Psychopunch; Schandmaul; U.D.O.

=== 2005 ===
Summer Breeze Open Air 2005 was held from Thursday, 18 August to Saturday, 20 August.

Main Stage
Thursday	Friday	Saturday
Midnattsol; Born from Pain; The Bones; Pink Cream 69; Schandmaul; Therion; Amon Amarth	Powerwolf; Korpiklaani; Koroded; Krisiun; Emil Bulls; Die Apokalyptischen Reiter; Dark Tranquillity; Opeth; In Extremo	Barcode; Draconian; Lacrimas Profundere; Orphaned Land; Caliban; Such A Surge; Subway to Sally; JBO; Lacuna Coil

Pain Stage
Thursday	Friday	Saturday
Final Breath; Anorexia Nervosa; Impious; Macabre; God Dethroned; Ektomorf; Haggard	Maroon; Aborted; Nocte Obducta; Skindred; Norther; Behemoth; Atrocity; The Exploited; Wintersun	Suidakra; Enthroned; Endstille; Disbelief; The Vision Bleak; Symphorce; End of Green; Tristania; Pain

=== 2006 ===
Summer Breeze Open Air 2006 was held from Thursday, 17 August to Saturday, 19 August.

Main Stage
Thursday	Friday	Saturday
Subconscious; Volbeat; Neaera; The Haunted; Moonspell; Finntroll; Kreator	Apostasy; Leng Tch'e; Trail of Tears; Potentia Animi; Rebellion; Exilia; Amorphis; Morbid Angel; Lacrimosa	The Other; Lumsk; Visions of Atlantis; Necrophagist; Totenmond; Corvus Corax; Negative; Gamma Ray; Fear Factory

Pain Stage
Thursday	Friday	Saturday
Tourettes Syndrome; Undertow; Angel Blake; Saltatio Mortis; 1349; ASP; Katatonia	Exrementory Grindfuckers; The Ocean; Fragments of Unbecoming; Scar Symmetry; One Man Army and the Undead Quartet; Turisas; Heaven Shall Burn; Liv Kristine; Deathstars	Perzonal War; Gojira; Legion of the Damned; Carnal Forge; Psychopunch; Thyrfing; Bloodflowerz; Unleashed; My Dying Bride

=== 2007 ===
16 – 18 August 2007

Absolute – After Forever – Amon Amarth – Black Messiah – Blitzkid — Bolt Thrower – Caliban — Communic – Crematory – Dagoba – Dark Fortress – Dark Funeral – Dark Tranquillity – Deadlock – Die Apokalyptischen Reiter – Disillusion – Dornenreich – Doro – Eisbrecher – End of Green – Eluveitie – Before the Dawn — Fall of Serenity – Fear My Thoughts – Finntroll – Hardcore Superstar – Helrunar – Hevein – Illdisposed – Immolation – Impious – In Extremo – Justice – Karakadan – Koldbrann – Krypteria – Lacrimas Profundere – L'Âme Immortelle – Machinemade God – Maroon – Moonsorrow – Necrophobic – Nevermore – Nightrage – Oomph! – Pain – Poisonblack – Powerwolf – President Evil – Rage – Secrets of the Moon – Sirenia – Soulfly – Squealer A.D. – Suffocation – Swallow the Sun – Tankard – Tanzwut – The Black Dahlia Murder – Volbeat – War from a Harlot's Mouth – Xandria

=== 2008 ===
14–16 August 2008

Cradle of Filth, Helloween, Subway to Sally, Six Feet Under, Paradise Lost, Arch Enemy, As I Lay Dying, Heaven Shall Burn, ASP, Kataklysm, H-Blockx, Soilwork, Exodus, Ensiferum, Anathema, Primordial, Primal Fear, Marduk, End of Green, Korpiklaani, Destruction, Pro-Pain, Eluveitie, Sonic Syndicate, the Wildhearts, Dismember, Behemoth, Neaera, Saltatio Mortis, Emil Bulls, The Vision Bleak, Graveworm, Keep of Kalessin, Cult of Luna, Megaherz, Mad Sin, Autumn, Endstille, Orphaned Land, Born from Pain, 3 Inches of Blood, Hollenthon, Aborted, Schelmish, All Ends, Týr, Hail of Bullets, Onslaught, Mustasch, The Rotted, Novembre, Dark Fortress, Cephalic Carnage, Jesus on Extasy, Shadow Reichenstein, Blood Red Throne, Rotten Sound, Diablo Swing Orchestra, Midnattsol, Misery Speaks, Fleshcrawl, Despised Icon, Lay Down Rotten, Hackneyed, Sworn, Debauchery, Textures, Månegarm, Negură Bunget, Dark Age, XIV Dark Centuries, Heidevolk, Enemy of the Sun, Ahab, The Old Dead Tree, Anima, Beloved Enemy, Nmemine, Hacride, Agrypnie, Drone, Misanthrope, Kissin' Dynamite

=== 2009 ===
13–15 August 2009

- Amon Amarth
- Amorphis
- Anaal Nathrakh
- Backyard Babies
- Battlelore
- Before the Dawn
- Beneath the Massacre
- Benighted
- Black Messiah
- Born from Pain
- Brainstorm
- Callejon
- Corvus Corax
- Cataract
- Cynic
- Dagoba
- Deadlock
- Deathstars
- Elvenking
- Entombed
- Epica
- Equilibrium
- Evocation
- The Faceless
- Firewind
- Ghost Brigade
- God Dethroned
- Grand Magus
- Grave
- Haggard
- Hate
- Hate Eternal
- The Haunted
- J.B.O.
- Jack Slater
- Katatonia
- Katra
- Koldbrann
- Kreator
- Legion of the Damned
- Life of Agony
- Misery Index
- Moonspell
- Narziss
- The New Black
- One Way Mirror
- Opeth
- The Other
- Powerwolf
- Protest the Hero
- Psychopunch
- Psycroptic
- Raunchy
- The Red Chord
- Sabaton
- Sacred Steel
- Schandmaul
- Skyforger
- The Sorrow
- The Storm
- Suffocation
- Suicide Silence
- Sylosis
- Unearth
- Unheilig
- Unlight
- Unsun
- Urgehal
- Vader
- Voivod
- Volbeat
- Vomitory
- Vreid
- Waylander

=== 2010 ===
19–21 August 2010

- 1349
- The 69 Eyes
- Ahab
- Anathema
- Annotations of an Autopsy
- Asphyx
- Barren Earth
- Be'lakor
- Callisto
- Cannibal Corpse
- Children of Bodom
- The Crown
- Cumulo Nimbus
- Dark Funeral
- Dark Tranquillity
- Deadstar Assembly
- Despised Icon
- The Devil's Blood
- Die Apokalyptischen Reiter
- Dying Fetus
- Eisbrecher
- Eisregen
- Endstille (replacement act for Behemoth)
- Equilibrium
- FeuerschwanzFejd
- Fiddler's Green
- Frei.Wild
- Hacride
- Hail of Bullets
- Hypocrisy
- Ill Niño
- InMe
- Insomnium
- Korpiklaani
- Kylesa
- Leaves' Eyes
- Letzte Instanz
- Long Distance Calling
- Maroon
- Milking The Goatmachine
- Mono Inc.
- My Dying Bride
- Necrophagist
- Obituary
- Origin
- Orphaned Land
- Parkway Drive
- Poisonblack
- Rage
- Rebellion
- Sólstafir
- Sepultura
- Subway to Sally
- Suicidal Angels
- Swallow the Sun
- The Foreshadowing
- Tracedawn
- Unleashed
- Van Canto
- Velero
- War from a Harlot's Mouth
- We Butter the Bread with Butter

=== 2011 ===
18–20 August 2011

- 9mm Assi Rock'n'Roll
- A Pale Horse Named Death
- Amorphis
- Arch Enemy
- Arcturon
- Blitzkid
- Bolt Thrower
- Caliban
- Corvus Corax
- Criminal
- Davidian
- Deadlock
- Decapitated
- Demonical
- Der Weg Einer Freiheit
- Destruction
- Devil Sold His Soul
- Einherjer
- Engel
- Enslaved
- Excrementory Grindfuckers
- Facebreaker
- Farmer Boys
- Farewell to Arms
- Hail of Bullets
- HammerFall
- Hatebreed
- Hell
- Imperium Dekadenz
- In Extremo
- Internment
- J.B.O.
- Kalmah
- Kampfar
- Kvelertak
- Marduk
- Melechesh
- Moonsorrow
- Neaera
- Primordial
- Rev 16.8
- ReVamp
- Rotting Christ
- Saltatio Mortis
- Scar Symmetry
- Shear
- Skeletonwitch
- Smoke Blow
- Sodom
- Sonic Syndicate
- Steve from England
- Suicidal Tendencies
- Swashbuckle
- Sylosis
- Týr
- Tarja Turunen
- The Haunted
- The Ocean
- The Sorrow
- Trigger the Bloodshed
- Turisas
- Vader
- Vomitory
- Vreid
- Witchery
- Wolf

=== 2012 ===
16–18 August 2012

- Agrypnie
- Ahab
- Alcest
- Amoeba
- Amon Amarth
- Anaal Nathrakh
- Arsirius
- ASP
- Asphyx
- Audrey Horne
- Be'lakor
- Before the Dawn
- Behemoth
- Black Sun Aeon
- Bleed from Within
- Born from Pain
- Buffet of Fate
- Cattle Decapitation
- Corvus Corax
- Crowbar
- Dark Tranquillity
- Darkest Hour
- Deathstars
- Deez Nuts
- Desaster
- Dew-Scented
- Die Apokalyptischen Reiter
- Die Kassierer
- Eisregen
- Eluveitie
- Entrails
- Epica
- Eskimo Callboy
- Every Time I Die
- Excrementory Grindfuckers
- Farsot
- Ghost Brigade
- Glorior Belli
- Goodbye to Gravity
- Hatesphere
- Heidevolk
- Helheim
- Iced Earth
- Immortal
- In Solitude
- Incantation
- Insomnium
- Jasta VS. Windstein
- Katatonia
- Krisiun
- Lacuna Coil
- Manegarm
- Menhir
- Mono Inc.
- Morgoth
- Mystic Prophecy
- Naglfar
- Napalm Death
- Nifelheim
- Night In Gales
- Nile
- Norma Jean
- Obscure Sphinx
- Oomph!
- Paradise Lost
- Peter Pan Speedrock
- Rotterfeld
- Sepultura
- Shining
- Sick of It All
- Six Feet Under
- Subway to Sally
- Tanzwut
- Terror
- The Foreshadowing
- The Rotted
- The Unguided
- Toxic Holocaust
- Unearth
- Unleashed
- Vallenfyre
- We Butter the Bread with Butter
- While She Sleeps
- Within Temptation
- Without Words

=== 2013 ===
15–17 August 2013

- Agnostic Front
- Amorphis
- Alestorm
- Anthrax
- Architects
- Benediction
- Bury Tomorrow
- Carach Angren
- Cliteater
- Dark Funeral
- Der Weg Einer Freiheit
- Destruction
- Divide
- Dr. Living Dead
- Dying Fetus
- Eisbrecher
- Emmure
- Ensiferum
- Fear Factory
- Feuerschwanz
- Fiddler's Green
- Finntroll
- Firewind
- First Blood
- Fleshgod Apocalypse
- Grand Supreme Blood Court
- Grave
- Haggard
- Hate
- Hammercult
- Hatebreed
- In Flames
- Knorkator
- Korpiklaani
- Lamb of God
- Letzte Instanz
- Long Distance Calling
- Marduk
- Merrimack
- Moonspell
- Mustasch
- Nachtblut
- Neaera
- Necrophobic
- Orden Ogan
- Orphaned Land
- Powerwolf
- Primordial
- Pro-Pain
- Rotten Sound
- Sabaton
- Saltatio Mortis
- Sister Sin
- Soilwork
- Tiamat
- The Bones
- Tristania
- Vader
- Van Canto
- Walls of Jericho
- We Came as Romans
- Winterfylleth
- Witchcraft

=== 2014 ===
14–16 August 2014

- Aborted
- Ahab
- Alcest
- Alpha Tiger
- Anneke van Giersbergen
- Annisokay
- Arch Enemy
- August Burns Red
- Behemoth
- Benediction
- Biohazard
- Blasmusik Illenschwang
- Blues Pills
- Bodyfarm
- Brainstorm
- Caliban
- Callejon
- Carcass
- Carnal Ghoul
- Children of Bodom
- Chrome Division
- Cripper
- Crucified Barbara
- Cyrcus
- Deadlock
- Death Angel
- Decapitated
- Delain
- Devin Townsend Project
- Die Kassierer
- Down
- Eat the Gun
- Einherjer
- Eluveitie
- Enforcer
- Equilibrium
- Ereb Altor
- Eskimo Callboy
- Excrementory Grindfuckers
- Fjoergyn
- Gamma Ray
- Gingerpig
- Gothminister
- Grand Magus
- Gutalax
- Hail of Bullets
- Hamferð
- Heaven Shall Burn
- Heretoir
- His Statue Falls
- Hypocrisy
- Ignite
- Impaled Nazarene
- Imperium Dekadenz
- Insomnium
- In Extremo
- Iwrestledabearonce
- JBO
- Kampfar
- Kärbholz
- Lay Down Rotten
- Legion of the Damned
- Lost Society
- Machine Head
- Malrun
- Mantar
- Maroon
- Master
- Mono Inc.
- Mors Principium Est
- Motorjesus
- My Sleeping Karma
- Obituary
- Omega Massif
- Omnium Gatherum
- Pentagram Chile
- Primal Fear
- Rise of the Northstar
- Rotting Christ
- Sahg
- Science of Sleep
- Screamer
- Secrets of the Moon
- Skeletonwitch
- Stahlmann
- Supercharger
- Tarja Turunen
- Tenside
- Testament
- Texas in July
- The Agonist
- The Haunted
- The Idiots
- The Ocean
- The Unguided
- The Very End
- The Vintage Caravan
- Thyrfing
- Todtgelichter
- Tracy Ate a Bug
- Tragedy
- Twilight of the Gods
- Undertow
- Waldgeflüster
- Watain
- Winter of Sin
- Wintersun
- Wolfheart
- Wound

=== 2015 ===
12-15 August 2015

- Agalloch
- Alestorm
- Amorphis
- Antropomorphia
- Any Given Day
- Autumnal
- Avatarium
- Battle Beast
- Be'lakor
- Below
- Belphegor
- Betraying the Martyrs
- Black Stone Cherry
- Bloodbath
- Blutengel
- Breakdown of Sanity
- Cannibal Corpse
- Carach Angren
- Carnifex
- Chapel of Disease
- Combichrist
- Corvus Corax
- Cradle of Filth
- CROWN
- Dark Fortress
- Dark Tranquillity
- Death Angel
- Death to All
- Demonical
- Deserted Fear
- Destruction
- Devilment
- Diablo Blvd.
- Die Apokalyptischen Reiter
- Dornenreich
- Dreamshade
- Drescher
- Dust Bolt
- Eisregen
- Ektomorf
- Emil Bulls
- Ensiferum
- Finsterforst
- Fire Red Empress
- Fuck You and Die
- Ghost Brigade
- Gloryhammer
- Hackneyed
- Hämatom
- Hark
- Hatebreed
- Haudegen
- Heidevolk
- Hour of Penance
- Inquisition
- Isole
- John Coffey
- Kadavar
- Kataklysm
- Kissin’ Dynamite
- Knorkator
- Kreator
- Kyle Gass Band
- Lantlôs
- Lifeless
- Majesty
- Marduk
- Megaherz
- Milking the Goatmachine
- Morgoth
- Nachtgeschrei
- Nailed to Obscurity
- Ne Obliviscaris
- Neaera
- Necrotted
- Nervosa
- Nightwish
- Obey the Brave
- Opeth
- Ost+Front
- Panzer
- Paradise Lost
- Powerwolf
- Pripjat
- Pyogenesis
- Rectal Smegma
- Reliquiae
- Revel in Flesh
- Rogash
- Saltatio Mortis
- Schirenc plays Pungent Stench
- Sepultura
- Serum 114
- Severe Torture
- Sick of It All
- Sister Sin
- Sodom
- Sonic Syndicate
- Steve 'n' Seagulls
- Suicidal Angels
- Suicide Silence
- Tankard
- Temple of Baal
- Terror Universal
- The Duskfall
- The Gogets
- The Green River Burial
- The Sirens
- Thränenkind
- Thy Art Is Murder
- To the Rats and Wolves
- Trivium
- Troldhaugen
- TrollfesT
- Venom
- Vitja
- Walls of Jericho

=== 2016 ===
17-20 August 2016

- Abbath
- Accu§er
- Aeverium
- Agnostic Front
- Airbourne
- Almanac
- Arch Enemy
- Argyle Goolsby and The Roving Midnight
- Arkona
- Arktis
- Asenblut
- Asking Alexandria
- At the Gates
- Batushka
- Beyond the Black
- Bliksem
- Blues Pills
- Bömbers
- Bombus
- Burning Down Alaska
- Bury Tomorrow
- Carcass
- Cattle Decapitation
- Cliteater
- Coheed and Cambria
- Conan
- Coppelius
- D-A-D
- Deadlock
- Deez Nuts
- Downfall of Gaia
- Dying Fetus
- Dyscordia
- Eisbrecher
- Emmure
- Entombed A.D.
- Equilibrium
- Evil Invaders
- Exodus
- Fäulnis
- Fear Factory
- Feuerschwanz
- Goitzsche Front
- Gorod
- Grailknights
- Grand Magus
- Graveyard
- GYZE
- H_{2}O
- Harakiri for the Sky
- Heart of a Coward
- Hell City
- High Fighter
- Illdisposed
- Implore
- In the Woods…
- Insanity Alert
- Iron Reagan
- Kärbholz
- Katatonia
- Ketzer
- Kneipenterroristen
- Korpiklaani
- Letzte Instanz
- Lord of the Lost
- Lost Society
- Mantar
- Mastodon
- Monuments
- Moonsorrow
- Mr. Hurley & Die Pulveraffen
- My Dying Bride
- Napalm Death
- Nasty
- Nim Vind
- Nocte Obducta
- Novelists
- Obscura
- Obscure Infinity
- Ohrenfeindt
- Omnium Gatherum
- One I Cinema
- Pain
- Parasite Inc.
- Parkway Drive
- Primordial
- Psychopunch
- Queensrÿche
- Randale
- Rotten Sound
- Sabaton
- Saille
- Satyricon
- Skálmöld
- Slaughterday
- Slayer
- Soilwork
- Stallion
- Steak Number Eight
- Steel Panther
- Stepfather Fred
- Stick to Your Guns
- Subway to Sally
- Swallow the Sun
- Testament
- The Black Dahlia Murder
- The New Roses
- The Other
- The Word Alive
- Thundermother
- Toxpack
- Tragedy
- Traitor
- Tribulation
- Undertow
- Unearth
- Unleashed
- Vader
- Versengold
- Winterstorm
- Wolfheart
- Zodiac

=== 2017 ===
16–19 August 2017

- 1349
- Amon Amarth
- Amorphis
- Architects
- Asphyx
- August Burns Red
- Aversions Crown
- Battle Beast
- Belphegor
- Cellar Darling
- Chelsea Grin
- Children of Bodom
- Corvus Corax
- Crowbar
- Cryptopsy
- Cypecore
- Dark Tranquility
- Decapitated
- Delain
- Devin Townsend Project
- Eisregen
- Eluveitie
- Emil Bulls
- End of Green
- Ensiferum
- Epica
- Erdling
- Fiddler's Green
- Finntroll
- Gorguts
- Haggard
- Hatebreed
- Heaven Shall Burn
- In Extremo
- Insomnium
- Knorkator
- Korn
- Kreator
- Life of Agony
- Megadeth
- MGLA
- Miss May I
- Mono Inc.
- Moonspell
- Nile
- Obituary
- Overkill
- Possessed
- Sacred Reich
- Sister
- Sonata Arctica
- Steve 'n' Seagulls
- Suffocation
- Terror
- Tiamat
- Wardruna
- Whitechapel
- Wintersun

=== 2018 ===
15–18 August 2018

- Alestorm
- Amaranthe
- Annisokay
- Any Given Day
- Arch Enemy
- At the Gates
- Backyard Babies
- Bannkreis
- Beartooth
- Behemoth
- The Black Dahlia Murder
- Blasmusik
- Bloodbath
- Broken Teeth
- Cannibal Corpse
- Caliban
- Die Apokalyptischen Reiter
- Dirkschneider
- Dying Fetus
- Eisbrecher
- Eskimo Callboy
- Farmer Boys
- Feuerschwanz
- Goatwhore
- Graveyard
- Illenschwang
- Jasta Kadavar
- JBO
- Kataklysm
- Korpiklaani
- Metal Allegiance
- Misery Index
- Mr. Hurley & Die Pulveraffen
- The Night Flight Orchestra
- Obscura
- Orange Goblin
- Orden Ogan
- Origin
- Paradise Lost
- Ross the Boss
- Saltatio Mortis
- Schandmaul
- Sepultura
- Sirenia
- Sick of It All
- Solstafir
- Tankard
- Toxic Holocaust
- Wolfheart

=== 2019 ===
14–17 August 2019

- All Hail the Yeti
- Anomalie
- Death Angel
- Endseeker
- Enslaved
- Evil Invaders
- Eyes Set to Kill
- Hate Squad
- Hollywood Burns
- Hypocrisy
- Ingested
- Knasterbart
- Letters From the Colony
- Loathe
- Midnight
- Nailed to Obscurity
- Soilwork
- Thron
- Windhand
- Anaal Nathrakh
- Avantasia
- Avatar
- Battle Beast
- Bembers
- Brymir
- Caspian
- Clawfinger
- Cradle of Filth
- Decapitated
- Deicide
- Downfall of Gaia
- Déluge
- Fear of Domination
- Frosttide
- Get the Shot
- In Flames
- Iron Reagan
- Kambrium
- Krisiun
- Kvelertak
- Lik
- Lionheart
- Lord of the Lost
- Meshuggah
- Mustasch
- Of Mice and Men
- Slaughter Messiah
- Testament
- The Contortionist
- The Dogs
- Twilight Force
- Unearth
- Versengold
- Xenoblight
- Aborted
- After the Burial
- Airbourne
- Beast in Black
- Crippled Black Phoenix
- Cypecore
- Deserted Fear
- Dornenreich
- DragonForce
- Dust Bolt
- Dyscarnate
- Décembre Noir
- Emperor
- Hamferð
- HammerFall
- Harpyie
- Heavysaurus
- Izegrim
- King Apathy
- King Diamond
- Kissin' Dynamite
- Legion of the Damned
- Napalm Death
- Parkway Drive
- Promethee
- Queensrÿche
- Rotting Christ
- Skindred
- Turbobier
- Teethgrinder
- The Lazys
- Thy Art Is Murder
- Une Misère
- Unprocessed
- Zeal and Ardor
- Ahab
- Begging for Incest
- Brainstorm
- Bullet for My Valentine
- Burning Witches
- Bury Tomorrow
- Carnal Decay
- Dimmu Borgir
- Eluveitie
- Equilibrium
- Evergreen Terrace
- Final Breath
- Gaahls Wyrd
- Grand Magus
- Gutalax
- Higher Power
- Hämatom
- Leprous
- Lordi
- Mr. Irish Bastard
- Nasty
- Oceans of Slumber
- Orphalis
- Ost+Front
- Pighead
- Rectal Smegma
- Rise of the Northstar
- Skálmöld
- Soen
- Subway to Sally
- The Ocean
- Unleashed
- Van Canto
- Winterstorm

=== 2020–2021 ===
Unfortunately, Summer Breeze Open Air 2020 - 2021 did not take place as the festival was cancelled due to the COVID-19 pandemic. However, the organizers have already announced the planned line-up, which was scheduled for August 12–15, 2020, but was canceled at the request of the authorities.

== Publications ==
=== DVDs ===
- Summer Breeze – All Areas 2002 (Warner Music Group, 2002)

Tracks

1. Gurd – Older But Wiser
2. Brainstorm – Blind Suffering
3. Die Apokalyptischen Reiter – Gone
4. Amon Amarth – Bleed For Ancient Gods
5. Soilwork – Flame Out
6. End of Green – Highway 69
7. Bloodflowerz – Diabolic Angel
8. Emil Bulls – Symphony Of Destruction
9. Sentenced – Blood & Tears
10. Hypocrisy – The Final Chapter
11. Vader – Xeper
12. Ektomorf – Fire
13. Pro-Pain – Fuck It
14. Prime Sth. – From The Inside
15. Paradise Lost – True Belief
16. Nightwish – End Of All Hope
17. Stormwitch – Tears By The Firelight
18. Samael – Jupiterian Vibe

=== CDs ===
- Various Artists – Summer Breeze vs. Metal Blade (Promo CD, 2004)

(This CD was given out at the 2004 festival.) Tracks

1. Six Feet Under – Blind & Gagged
2. Brainstorm – Doorway To Survive
3. Vomitory – Gore Apocalypse
4. Disillusion – And The Mirror Cracked
5. Fleshcrawl – Flesh Bloody Flesh
6. Criminal – Aberration
7. Fragments Of Unbecoming – The Seventh Sunray Enlights My Pathway
8. Gorerotted – Masticated By The Spasticated
9. Monstrosity – The Exordium
10. Nasty Savage – Psycho, Psycho
11. Torchbearer – Sown Are The Seeds Of Death
12. Cannibal Corpse – Decency Defied
13. Symphorce – Tears
14. Shining Fury – Speed Of Life
- Various Artists – Summer Breeze 2005 (Promo CD, 2005)

(This CD was given out at the 2005 festival.)

Tracks

1. End of Green – Dead End Hero
2. Born From Pain – The New Hate
3. Korpiklaani – Hunting Song
4. Powerwolf – Kiss Of The Cobra King
5. Wintersun – Beyond The Dark Sun
6. Enthroned – Crimson Legions
7. Ektomorf – Show Your Fist
8. Midnattsol – Another Return
9. Koroded – T.A.B.O.B.A.
10. Disbelief – Rewind It All
11. Symphorce – No Shelter
12. Anorexia Nervosa – Worship Manifesto
13. Such A Surge – Was jetzt?
14. Draconian – Death, Come Near Me
15. Impious – Wicked Saints
16. Die Apokalyptischen Reiter – Eruption
17. God Dethroned – Last Zip Of Spit
18. Barcode – No Lust For Life
19. Therion – Typhon
