= Epysode =

Belgian progressive metal band

Epysode was a Belgian progressive metal project. The band issued two albums on AFM Records.

A project made by Samuel Arkan from Virus IV, he used guest musicians as to be called a supergroup. The group featured a range of different vocalists, both male and female. They released two albums, Obsessions (2011) and Fantasmagoria (2013).

== Reception ==
In reviewing Obsessions, Metal.de found that the songs were "consistently good and listenable"; complex, but still catchy. The sound was good, the mixing and mastering "impeccable". The lyrics also had considerable depth, the reviewer found. Still, Epysode fell short of Symphony X, and received the score 8 out of 10. Powermetal.de were sitting somewhat higher, at 8.5. Epysode was among the "imitators" of Ayreon, but managed to put out "consistently high" quality on Obsessions. The album would invoke "intense emotions", though sometimes it "veers a little too far into excessive pathos". Norway's Scream Magazine praised the album as "as good as free of dead spots". It was one of the surprises of the year, received the score 5 out of 6 and could safely be bought without previewing. The reviewer especially lauded the vocals of Kelly Sundown Carpenter.

Denmark's Heavymetal.dk gave 7 out of 10, calling the album "a solid progressive power metal opera". Rock Hard only scored the album 6.5 out of 10.

Heavymetal.dk praised 2013's Fantasmagoria as "no less than a masterpiece". Rock Hard was more reserved, though improving their rating to 7.5 for this album. Powermetal.de decreased their rating to the same number, though "The fourteen tracks are almost entirely filled with fantastic, powerful riffs, melodic highlights, and superb vocals. The current material sounds incredibly fresh, heavy, and varied". Epysode could however have omitted two or three tracks, the reviewer opined.

== Personnel ==
On Obsessions:

- Samuel Arkan – guitar
- Rick Altzi – vocals (At Vance)
- Kelly Sundown Carpenter – vocals (Beyond Twilight)
- Oddleif Stensland – vocals (Communic)
- Magali Luyten– vocals (Beautiful Sin)
- Liselotte Hegt – vocals (Cirrha Niva)
- Christophe Godin – guitar
- Kristoffer Gildenlöw – bass (Pain of Salvation)
- Léo Margarit – drums (Pain of Salvation)
- Julien Spreutels – keyboard (Ethernity)
- Tommy Hansen – keyboard, track 14

On Fantasmagoria:

- Samuel Arkan – guitar
- Tom S. Englund – vocals (Evergrey)
- Ida Haukland – vocals (Triosphere)
- Henning Basse – vocals (Metalium)
- Matt Marinelli – vocals (Borealis)
- Tezzi Persson – vocals
- Simone Mularoni – lead guitar (DGM)
- Mike LePond – bass (Symphony X)
- Léo Margarit – drums (Pain of Salvation)
- Julien Spreutels – keyboard (Ethernity)
