= AFM Records =

German music label

- Founded: 1996
- Founder: Andreas Allendörfer; Axel Fischer
- Status: Active
- Distributor: Soulfood Music
- Genre: Heavy metal, hard rock
- Country of origin: Germany
- Location: Schwalmstadt
- Official website: afm-records.com

AFM Records GmbH is a music label based in Schwalmstadt, Germany. They focus on the heavy metal musical genre, signing bands such as U.D.O., Doro, Lordi, Kotipelto, Masterplan, Nostradameus, Redlight King, and Annihilator.

In 2005, Candlelight Records signed a cooperative deal with AFM to mutually release and market several titles.

The exclusive distribution in Greece is being carried out by Infinity Entertainment IKE.

== Current and former artists ==
=== A ===
- Absolute
- Almah
- Alterium
- Annihilator
- Anvil
- Arion
- Armored Dawn
- At Vance
- Avantasia
- Axxis

=== B ===
- Beautiful Sin
- Betzefer (2010–present)
- Black Messiah
- Blackmore's Night
- Bloodbound
- Borealis
- Brainstorm
- Brothers of Metal

=== C ===
- Circle II Circle
- Cruachan
- Crystal Viper
- Communic
- Crystal Ball

=== D ===
- Dalriada
- Danko Jones
- Dark Age
- Dark at Dawn
- Dead City Ruins
- DeadRisen
- Debauchery
- Destruction
- Dezperadoz
- Dionysus
- Doro
- Dragonland
- Dust Bolt
- Dymytry
- Dynazty

=== E ===
- Eden's Curse
- Edguy
- Eisbrecher
- Ektomorf
- Elvenking
- Epysode
- Evergrey
- Evidence One

=== F ===
- Fear Factory

=== G ===
- Gama Bomb
- Gwar
- Gothminister

=== H ===
- Headhunter
- Heavenly
- Helion Prime
- Helstar

=== I ===
- Iron Mask
- Iron Savior
- Illdisposed

=== J ===
- Jon Oliva's Pain
- Jorn

=== K ===
- Korzus
- Kotipelto
- Krokus
- Kryptos (band)

=== L ===
- Leaves' Eyes
- Lion's Share
- Lansdowne
- Lordi
- Lyriel

=== M ===
- Made of Hate
- Magica
- Masterplan
- Mekong Delta
- Metalite
- Michelle Darkness
- Ministry
- Mister Misery
- Motorjesus
- Mob Rules
- Mors Principium Est
- Morton

=== N ===
- Neverland
- Nightmare
- Nocturnal Rites
- Nostradameus

=== O ===
- Oz
- Onslaught
- Orden Ogan (2008–2024)

=== P ===
- Paradox
- Personal War
- President Evil
- Pro-Pain
- Pure Inc.
- Pyogenesis
- Pyramaze

=== R ===
- Rawhead Rexx
- Rhapsody of Fire
- Rob Rock
- Redemption
- Redlight King

=== S ===
- Schattenmann
- Sencirow
- Serious Black
- Shaaman
- Shakra
- Silent Force
- Silent Skies
- SOiL
- Solution .45
- Squealer
- Steel Attack

=== T ===
- Tankard
- Tarantula
- The Poodles
- Theatre of Tragedy
- Tracee Lords

=== U ===
- U.D.O.

=== V ===
- Voice
- Vanishing Point

=== W ===
- We Butter the Bread with Butter
- Whitesnake
- Wicked Wisdom
- Wolfpack

=== Y ===
- Yargos
