= Magali Luyten =

Belgian singer (born 1978)

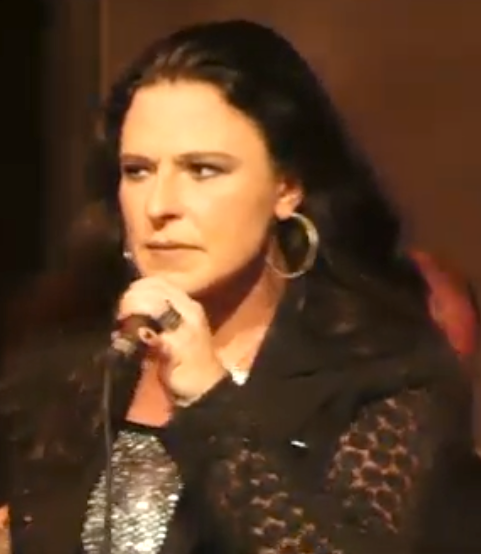
- Performing in 2019

Background information
- Also known as: Maggy Luyten
- Born: 16 July 1978 (age 48); Brussels, Belgium
- Origin: Belgium
- Genres: Heavy metal, power metal
- Occupations: Musician, songwriter
- Instrument: Vocals
- Website: www.maggyluyten.com

Magali Luyten (born 16 July 1978), also known as Maggy Luyten, is a Belgian female rock singer. She is also a vocal coach and voice teacher at MYRIAD VOIC. She was raised in Leuven and then moved to the South of Belgium, where she still lives today.

She played in several local bands before joining forces with the progressive metal band Over Us Eden from Aachen, Germany in 2003, produced by Uli Kusch, (ex-drummer of Helloween and Masterplan). Three years later, she was asked by Kusch, with whom she already collaborated in the past, to be the vocalist on his solo project Beautiful Sin. She recorded her vocals in Belgium and then flew to Norway to finish the work at Kusch's studio, together with guitarist Jørn Viggo Lofstad (Pagan's Mind, Jorn). Beautiful Sin debut album The Unexpected was acclaimed by heavy metal fans and specialized press worldwide. The tracks "Lost" and "Closer to My Heart" were featured on Nuclear Blast compilations Beautiful Voices II and III, AFM Records compilations All for Metal, and Gothic Melancholy Vol. XIX.

She is a contributing author in the 2nd edition of the book Raise Your Voice, by renowned vocal coach Jaime Vendera.

2008 - She performed guest vocals for different projects, including Ayreon's 01011001. Arjen Lucassen told about her: "I kept bumping into Magali’s name in different bands, and I was so impressed with her voice every time I heard her. I knew I’d like to work with her one day… she is just amazing". She performed live acoustically the song "Ride the Comet" at the Stairway to Heaven in Utrecht, Netherlands for Ayreon's release party in January 2008 with Floor Jansen (ex-After Forever, ex-ReVamp, Nightwish) and Robert Soeterboek.

That same year, Luyten joined Renaut van Oeyen, François Brisk (ex-Dyslesia) and Christophe Babin (ex-Headline and Eradicate) in the Belgian classic metal band Virus IV for their debut album Dark Sun, released on Thundering Records. In 2009, the songs "Frightening Lanes" and "Such a Shame" (cover of Talk Talk hit single) were selected by EMI Records to appear on the 3-CD compilation album I Love New Wave in France and in 2010 by Femme Metal Records for the compilation Beauty and Brutality in United Kingdom. Virus IV performed at many festivals including PPM Fest, Alcatraz, Raismes Festival, Namrock, Loaf, Rocksound and Durbuy and opened for Scorpions, Saxon and Evergrey among others.

Luyten proved her talents as vocal coach and singer in the concept album Obsessions, released in 2011 by Virus IV guitarist Samuel Arkan's side project Epysode. The album was recorded by Gerald Jans at Noise Factory Studio in Belgium and mixed and mastered by Tommy Hansen at Jailhouse Studios in Denmark. Epysode boasted an outstanding cast of musicians and vocalists, including Kristoffer Gildenlöw, Léo Margarit (Pain of Salvation), Christophe Godin (Gnô, Metal Kartoon), Julien Spreutels (Ethernity), Kelly Sundown (Beyond Twilight, Darkology, Adagio), Oddleif Stensland (Communic), Liselotte Hegt (Ayreon, Dial) and Rick Altzi (At Vance, Thunderstone). The official videoclip for the song "Obsessions" was directed by Damien Brunet where Luyten plays the character "Esh - The Soul".

2014 - She was the last minute replacement for female singer Dilenya Mar in the band Beyond the Bridge with Herbie Langhans (Sinbreed, Voodoo Circle, Avantasia), which was the opening act for Serenity's "War of Ages European Tour".

Oct 2015 - She's announced as the new vocalist of French band Nightmare. Their new album Dead Sun was released by AFM Records on 26 November 2016.

September 2017 - She once again joined Arjen Lucassen and performed live for the 3-night live Ayreon Universe concert.

Sept 2018 - Maggy & friends exclusive acoustic show as opening act for Kip Winger April 2019 - Announcement of Maggy leaving Nightmare

July 2020 - Announcement of her new band "THE PRIZE" with Christophe Godin

== Discography ==
- Spirittales - The Dreambookseller (2001)
- Over Us Eden - Over Us Eden (2003)
- Beautiful Sin - The Unexpected (2006)
- Jaime Vendera – Voices of Rock, compilation (2007)
- Rooky - Extended (2007)
- Ayreon - 01011001 (2008)
- Virus IV - Dark Sun (2008)
- Ayreon vs. Avantasia - Elected (EP) (2008)
- Ayreon - Timeline (2008)
- Epysode - Obsessions (2011)
- Nightmare - The Burden of God, The Dominion Gate (Part II) (2012)
- Flaming Row - Mirage - A Portrayal of Figures (2014)
- Nightmare - Dead Sun (2016)
- Ayreon - Ayreon Universe – The Best of Ayreon Live (2018)
- The Prize - The Prize (2022)
- Ayreon - 01011001 – Live Beneath the Waves (2024)
