= Dust Bolt =

German thrash metal band

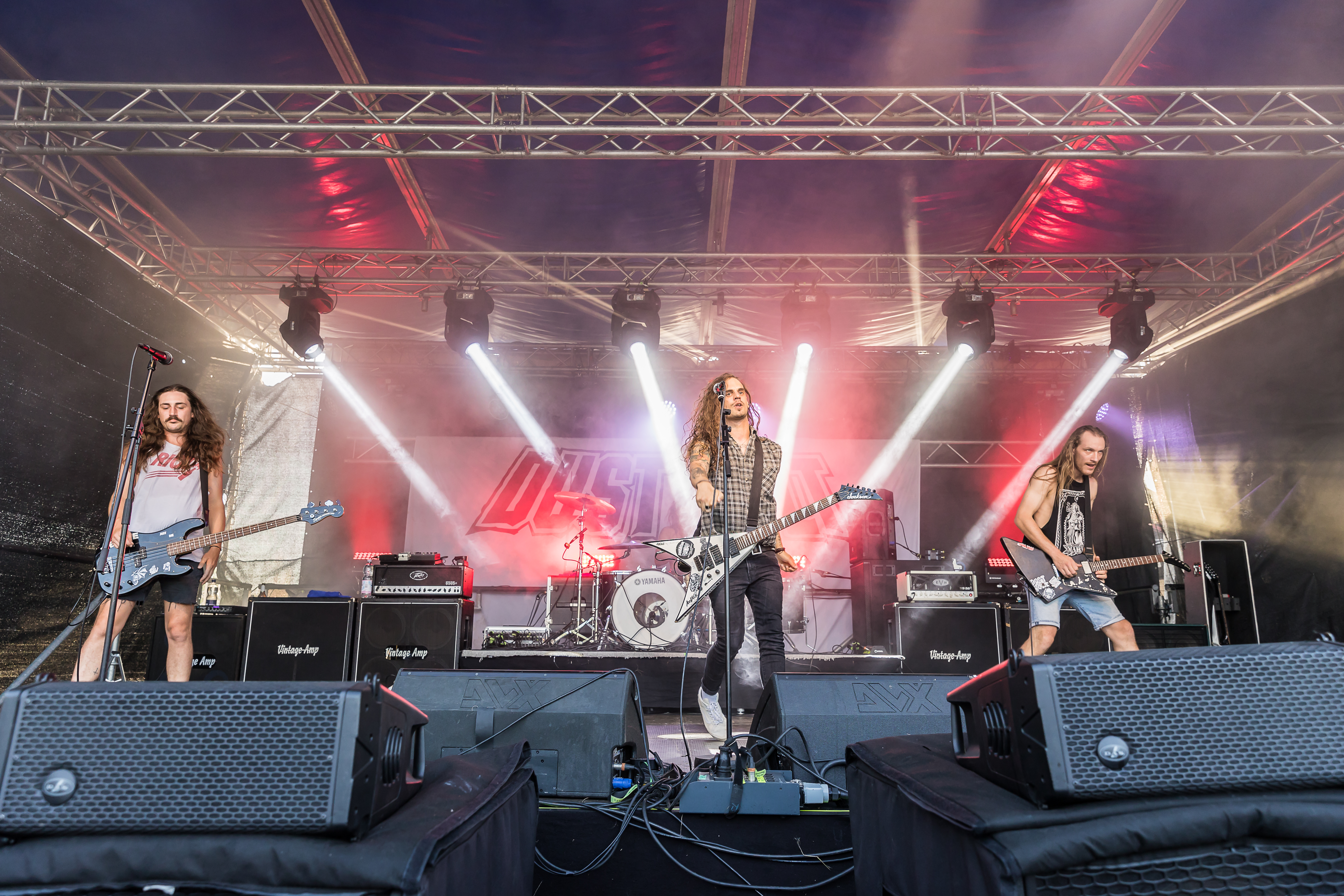
- Dust Bolt at Rock & Metal Day'z 2026, Germany

Background information
- Origin: Landsberg am Lech, Bavaria, Germany
- Genres: Thrash metal
- Years active: 2007–present
- Labels: Napalm, AFM
- Members: Nico Remann; Flo Dehn; Lenny Breuss; Tom Liebing
- Past members: Bene Münzel
- Website: dustbolt.com
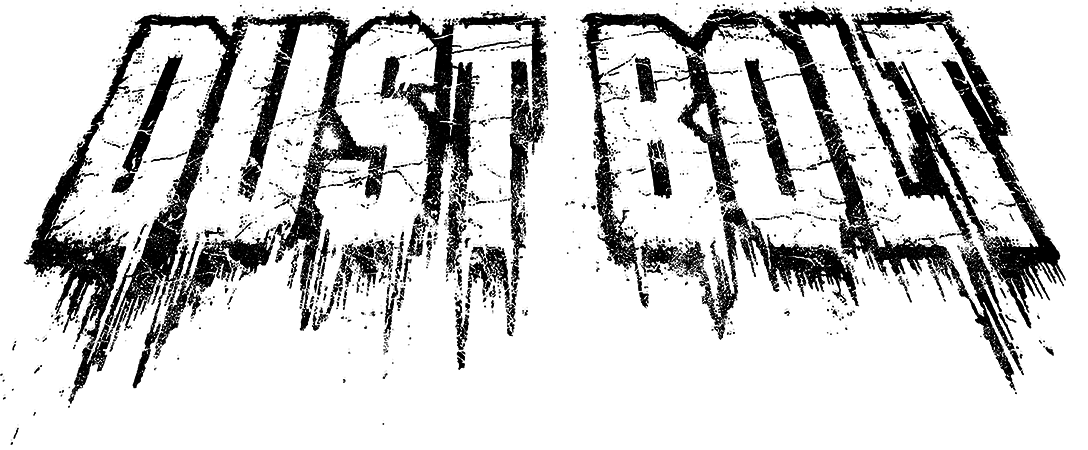

Dust Bolt is a German thrash metal band from Landsberg am Lech, Bavaria, that was formed in 2007. They have released five studio albums.

== History ==
=== Early years ===
The band was founded as a school band in 2007 under the name Die Letzten. Initially, they played cover versions of punk songs before changing their name to Dust Bolt shortly thereafter. Their first live performances followed, including shows with Sepultura and Napalm Death. In November 2009, they recorded their first demo, Chaos Possession, which was released in April 2010. Metal Hammer named the release "Demo of the Month". More concerts followed with bands such as Disbelief, Circle II Circle, Obituary, Hypocrisy, and Hackneyed, as well as a tour with Six Feet Under and Debauchery.

In 2011, the band won the German "Metal Battle" preliminaries and participated in the finals at Wacken Open Air. After initially recording their debut album independently, they signed a record deal with Napalm Records. Their debut album, Violent Demolition, was released in late July 2012 via Napalm and received a rating of 5 out of 7 points from Metal Hammer.

=== Breakthrough ===
Following numerous live shows and tours with bands such as Heathen, Generation Kill, and Dr. Living Dead, the band released their second studio album, Awake the Riot, in May 2014. With this album, they achieved their breakthrough in German-speaking countries and gained international recognition. After the release, the band headlined shows across Germany, Austria, the Czech Republic, and Switzerland, performed at festivals such as the Out & Loud Festival, and was hailed by the press as a promising new act in thrash metal.

In 2015, Dust Bolt joined the Inked in Blood European Tour 2015 as a support act for Obituary, touring all across Europe. Later that year, additional shows with Sepultura and festival appearances at events like Summer Breeze Open Air were confirmed. In early 2016, the band entered the studio to record their third album, Mass Confusion, which was released worldwide on 8 July 2016. The album was promoted through numerous festival performances and a subsequent headlining tour throughout the year.

=== Mainstream recognition ===
2017 marked a major milestone for Dust Bolt as they joined the Battle of the Bays 2017 Tour, touring the entire United States alongside Obituary, Exodus, and Power Trip. In winter 2017, they began working on their follow-up album, Trapped in Chaos, before heading back to the U.S. in spring to tour with Obituary, Skeletonwitch, and Pallbearer. During this tour, frontman Lenny "Bruce" Breuss even stepped in as lead guitarist for Obituary for two shows. That same year, Dust Bolt performed at major festivals like Wacken and Bloodstock Open Air and embarked on a headlining tour across Asia.

Their fourth album, Trapped in Chaos, was released on 18 January 2019, supported by an extensive tour and support shows for bands like Hatebreed and Testament. In 2020, bassist Bene Münzel left the band and was replaced by Tom Liebing. Dust Bolt completed a European tour with Unearth and Prong before taking a break during the COVID-19 pandemic to work on new material. Their fifth studio album, Sound & Fury, produced by Lenny Bruce himself, was released on 23 February 2024 via AFM Records. It aimed to showcase a musical evolution and stylistic shift, incorporating new elements, more clean vocals, and a modernized sound.

== Musical style ==
The band plays old-school thrash metal, with their music being inspired by classic Bay Area thrash metal while also incorporating some modern sounds and influences from other genres. Their style, which blends elements of bands like Slayer and Kreator, also features noticeable crossover and hardcore-influenced sections. In addition to their fast and aggressive thrash metal, which is also characterized by melodic elements in both vocals and guitars, the band is particularly known for their energetic live shows. AllMusic called the band "thrash revivalists in the vein of Kreator, Tankard, and Destruction."

== Members ==
Current members

- Lenny Breuss ("Lenny Bruce") – vocals, guitars
- Flo Dehn – guitars
- Nico Remann – drums
- Tom Liebing – bass (2022–present)

Former members

- Bene Münzel – bass (?–2022)

== Gallery ==
Band members at Rock & Metal Day'z 2026

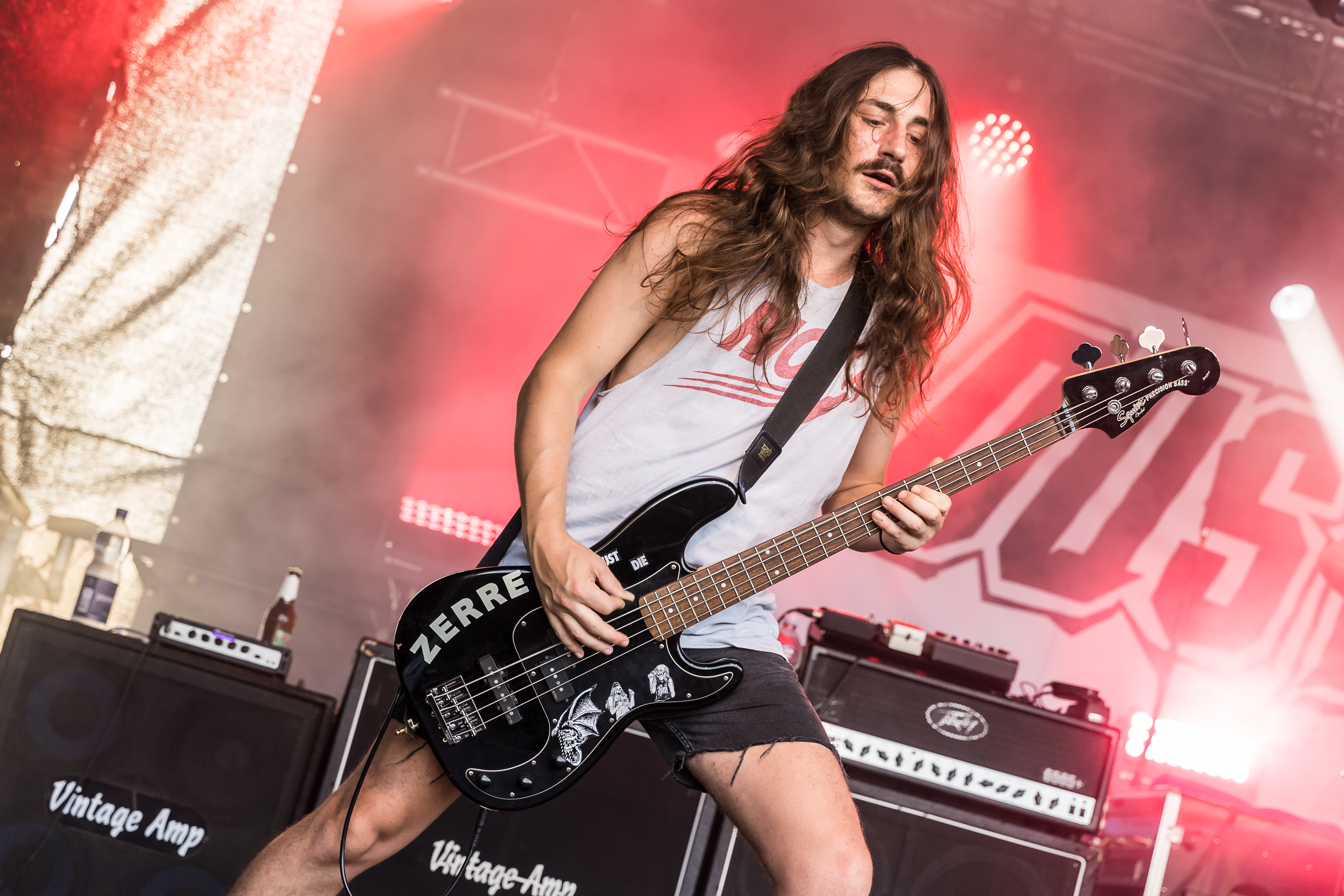
Jannik Berg, bass

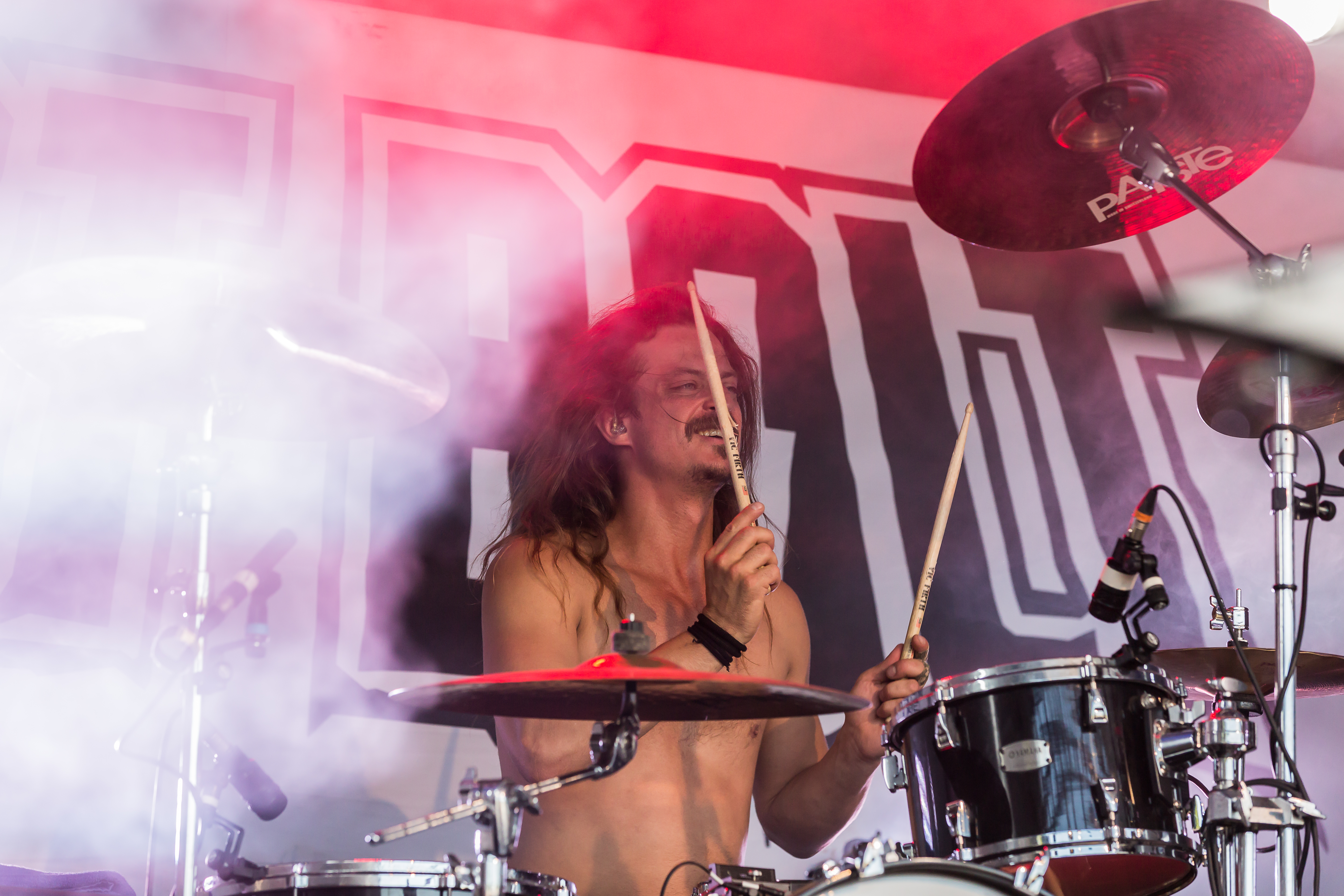
Nico Remann, drums

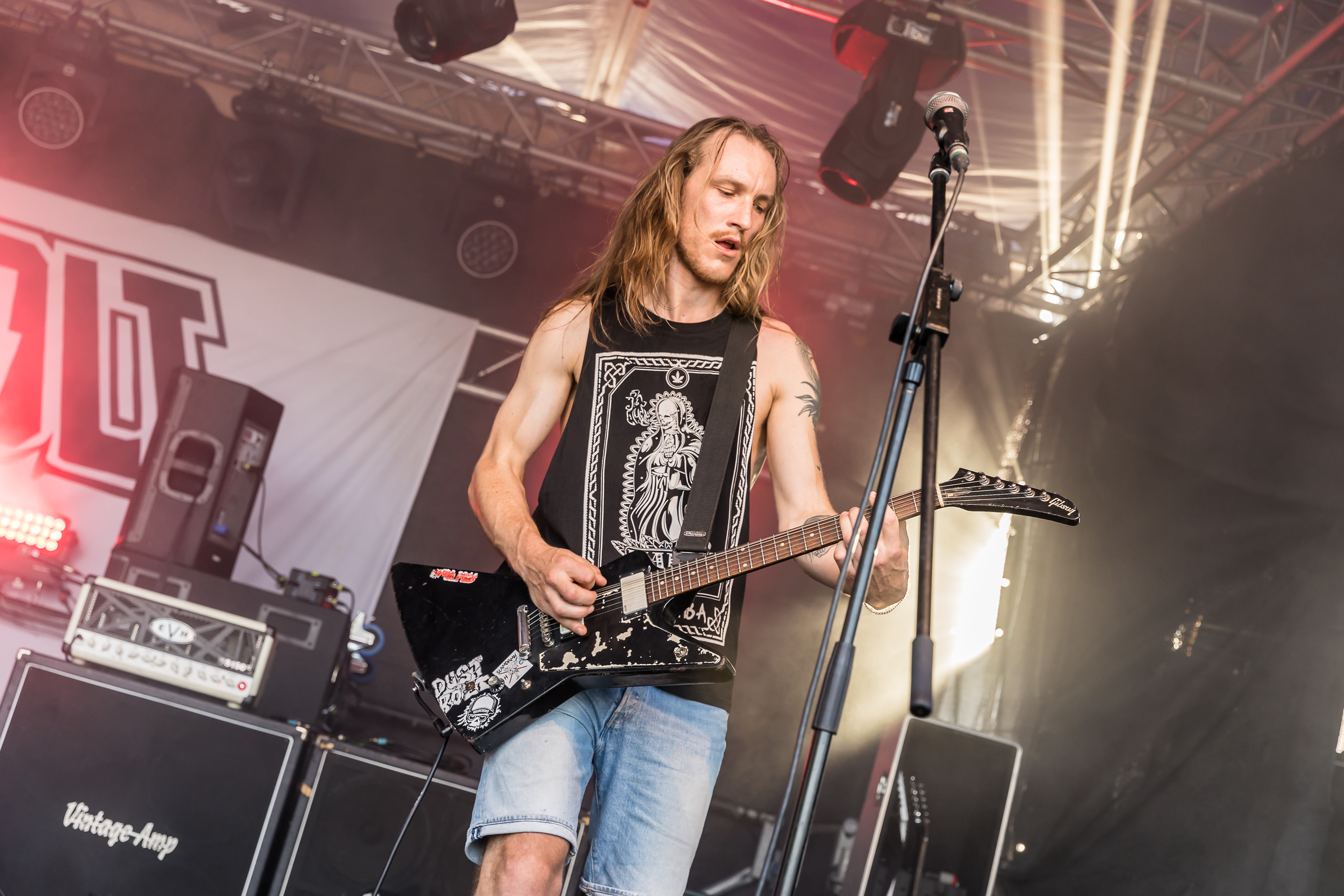
Flo Dehn, guitars

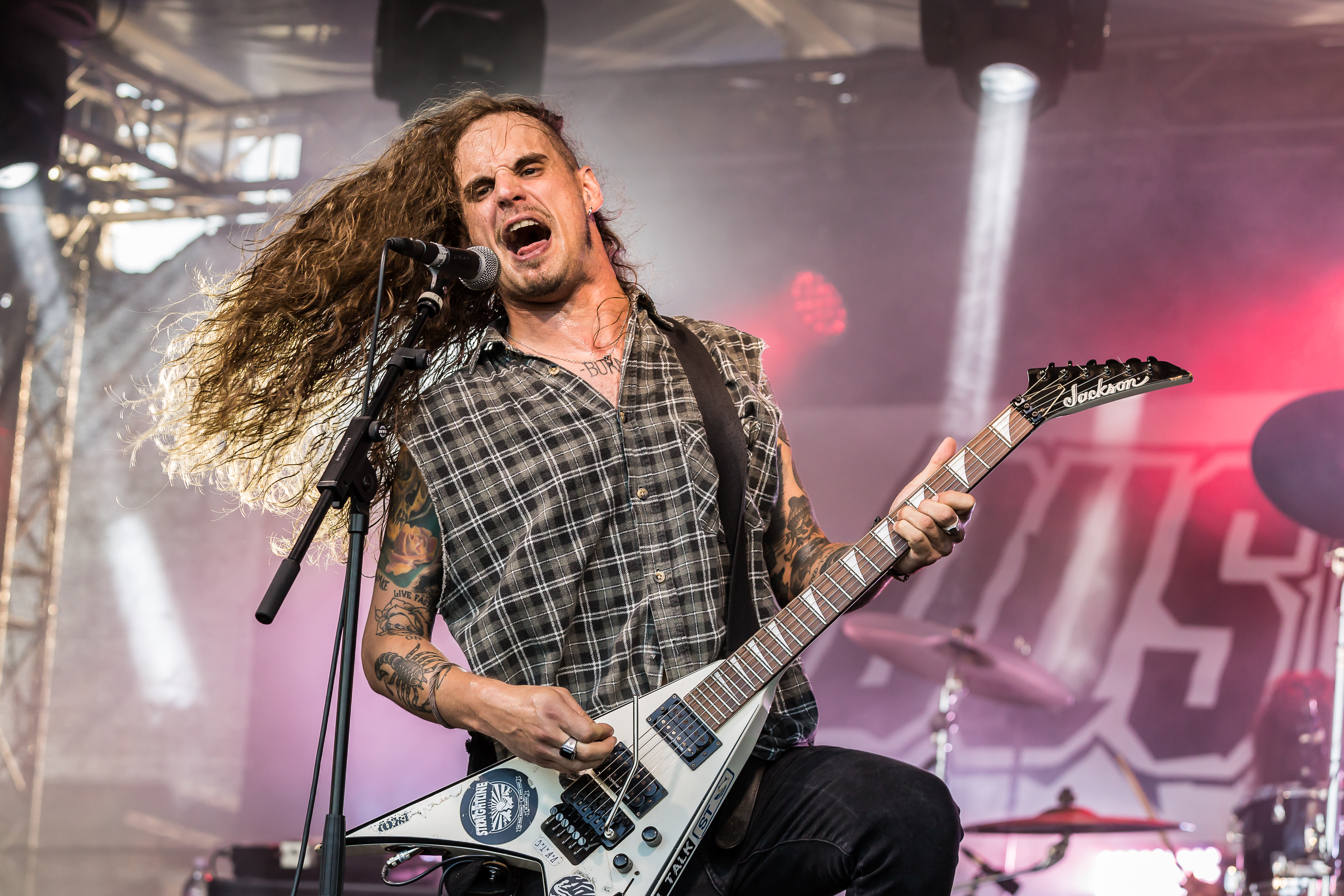
Lenny Breuss, vocals, guitars

== Discography ==
Studio albums

- 2012: Violent Demolition (Napalm Records)
- 2014: Awake the Riot (Napalm Records)
- 2016: Mass Confusion (Napalm Records)
- 2019: Trapped in Chaos (Napalm Records)
- 2024: Sound & Fury (AFM Records)

Demos

- 2010: Chaos Possession (self-released)
