= Nostradameus =

Swedish power metal band

- Origin: Gothenburg, Sweden
- Genres: Power metal, heavy metal, speed metal
- Years active: 1998–2010
- Labels: AFM Records
- Members: Freddy Persson; Jake Fredén; Lennart Specht; Thomas Antonsson; Esko Salow
- Past members: Michael Åberg; Erik Söderman; Gustav Nahlin; Jesse Lindskog

Nostradameus was a Swedish power metal band from Gothenburg. They were formed in 1998 and disbanded in 2010. Their latest release is Illusion's Parade.

== Members ==
=== Current ===
- Freddy Persson – vocals
- Jake Fredén – guitar
- Lennart Specht – guitar
- Thomas Antonsson – bass
- Esko Salow – drums

=== Former ===
- Michael Åberg – guitar
- Erik Söderman – guitar
- Gustav Nahlin – drums
- Jesse Lindskog – drums

== Discography ==
- Words of Nostradameus (2000)
- The Prophet of Evil (2001)
- The Third Prophecy (2003)
- Hellbound (2004)
- Pathway (2007)
- Illusion's Parade (2009)
