= Nightmare (French band) =

French power metal band

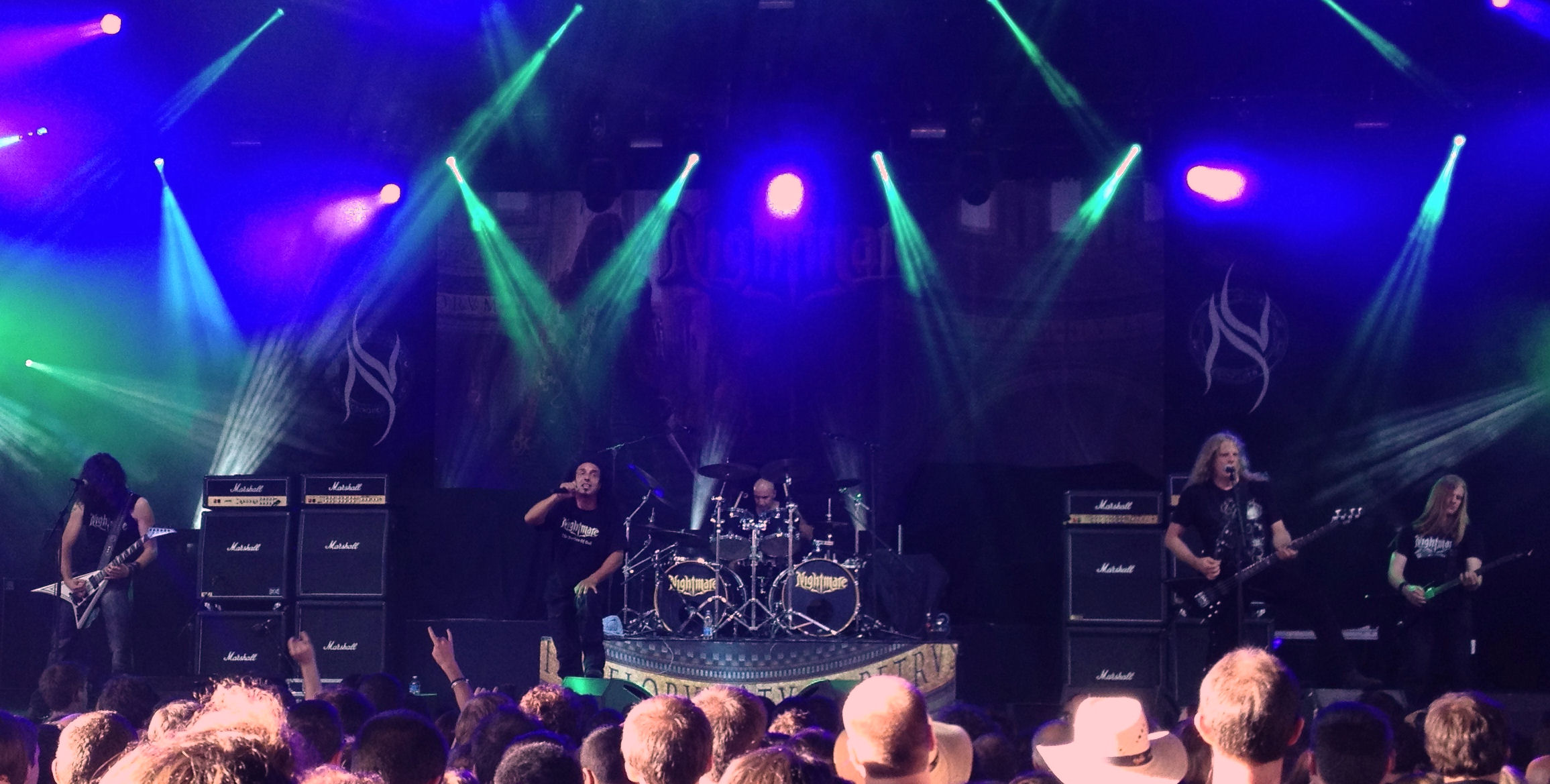
- Nightmare live in 2012

Background information
- Origin: Grenoble, France
- Genres: Heavy metal, power metal
- Years active: 1979–1987, 1999–present
- Labels: Ebony (1983–1985); Dream (1985–1987); Adipocere (1999–2000); Napalm (2000–2004); Regain (2005–2008); AFM (2009-present)
- Members: Jo Amore; Franck Milleliri; JC "Jess" Lefevre; Yves Campion; David Amore
- Past members: Madie; Christophe Houpert; Jean-Marie Boix; Magali Luyten; Tom Jackson; Nicolas De Dominicis; Jean Stripolli; Alex Hilbert; Stéphane Rabilloud; Matt Asselbergs; Barbara Mogore; NialsQuiais; Olivier Casula
- Website: www.nightmare-metal.com

Nightmare is a French power metal band, from Grenoble. The band was influenced by the new wave of British heavy metal phenomenon developing in the UK in the 1980s and started their career playing classic heavy metal, that later changed to power metal with death metal and thrash metal influences.

== Biography ==
=== Early career ===
Nightmare was formed in 1979 and became known when they opened for Def Leppard at the Alpexpo of Grenoble in 1983, in front of an audience of more than 4000. They signed for the label Ebony Records, which published the album Waiting for the Twilight. The LP entered the charts in Japan and was distributed in Greece by Virgin Records. Nightmare replaced singer Christophe Houpert with Jean-Marie Boix to record their second album Power of the Universe. Shortly after, the band terminated its partnership with Ebony Records and the album was reissued in France by Dream Records. Their new label was soon subjected to financial difficulties, which delayed the release of an LP the band was working on. In addition, Jean-Marie Boix was forced to leave the band because of health problems. He was replaced by Scottish singer Tom Jackson (ex- Praying Mantis), hoping that his vocal qualities and his mastery of the English language could help the success of Nightmare on the other side of the Channel. This incarnation of Nightmare produced a demo with two songs and did a few shows in France and England, with moderate success. However, dissension between the musicians about the musical direction for the band, whose music was veering toward AOR, led to disbandment in 1987, closing for more than a decade the career of Nightmare.

=== Reformation ===
Nightmare was reborn in 1999 with a revised line-up. Jo Amore, former drummer, took the singer position and left the sticks to his younger brother, David.

The band signed a contract with Adipocere Records and released the mini-album Astral Deliverance, recorded in tribute to Jean-Marie Boix deceased a few months before. Moreover, the old albums were reissued by Brennus Records. Nightmare released also the double-live album Live Deliverance, recorded at the reunion concert held on 30 October 1999 at the Summum of Grenoble. It was the first double-live album ever made by a French metal band. In 2000, Nightmare performed at the festival of Artifacts in Strasbourg and at the prestigious Wacken Open Air Festival.

At the end of the year, Nightmare formalized their collaboration with Napalm Records and in June 2001 began recording the album Cosmovision at Soundsuite Studio, changing their music to melodic power metal. The album was produced by Terje Refnes, known for his work with Theatre of Tragedy, Enslaved, Carpathian Forest and others. The famous French guitarist Patrick Rondat made a guest appearance on the first song "Spirit of the Sunset". The band then left for a short tour with Saxon in France and Italy and opened in Grenoble for Grave Digger, who played on this occasion their first concert in France. At the end of the tour, Alex Hilbert replaced at the guitar Jean Stripolli, who left the band along with keyboardist Stephane Rabilloud. The following year, Nightmare flew to the United States to participate to the Metal Meltdown Festival, which included in the roster Manowar and Saxon. Back in Europe, they opened for Blind Guardian on the dates of Lyon and Paris and were featured in several festivals, including again the Wacken Open Air.

In 2003, Nightmare returned to Soundsuite Studio to record the concept album Silent Room and started the year 2004 with a European tour (France, Spain and Belgium), supporting After Forever and Dark Moor, that brought them to festivals such as the Rotunda Festival and Raismes Fest. Some time later, Nightmare ended amicably their collaboration with Napalm Records. At the end of the year, Nicolas De Dominicis, historical member of Nightmare, left the band and was replaced by guitarist Franck Milleliri. A contract was signed with Regain Records for the album The Dominion Gate, recorded again at Soundsuite Studio with Terje Refnes. A long tour followed in 2006, supporting After Forever, as in the previous one. The band visited France, Spain, the United Kingdom, Belgium, the Netherlands and Italy. The group also played a show in Tel Aviv. Nightmare were present at many summer festivals, including the Hellfest, where Alex Hilbert was unable to play and was substituted at the guitar by JC Jess. In August 2008, Alex Hilbert decided to leave the group for "personal reasons" after 6 years of service. He was permanently replaced by JC Jess.

In September 2009, Nightmare released their seventh album, Insurrection, with AFM Records. This album, heavier and more direct than its predecessors, earned the group many good reviews from press and fans. On 31 October 2009 the band held a concert for their 30th anniversary at the Edmond Vigne Hall in Grenoble, where the group originated. The concert was filmed for a DVD released in 2011. The group participated to the 2010 edition of the Wacken Open Air Festival and toured in South America the same year.

In July 2015, Jo and David Amore decided to quit Nightmare and "stop any collaboration with Yves Campion".

In August 30th 2022 on their Facebook page, Nightmare announced the departure of singer Madie, who was the vocalist for their 2020 album Aeternam. In October 2022, they announced their new vocalist Barbara Mogore.

On March 8, 2024, the band announced that their new album, Encrypted, would be released on June 7.

On March 19, 2026, the band announced the return of singer Jo Amore, drummer David Amore, and guitarist JC "Jess" Lefevre, while also announcing the departure of singer Barbara Mogore, drummer Nials Quiais, and guitarist Matt Asselbergs.

== Discography ==
=== Studio albums ===
- Waiting for the Twilight (1984)
- Power of the Universe (1985)
- Cosmovision (2001)
- Silent Room (2003)
- The Dominion Gate (2005)
- Genetic Disorder (2007)
- Insurrection (2009)
- The Burden of God (2012)
- The Aftermath (2014)
- Dead Sun (2016)
- Aeternam (2020)
- Encrypted (2024)

=== EPs ===
- Astral Deliverance (1999)
- Divine Nemesis (2020)

=== Live albums ===
- Live Deliverance (2000)
- One Night of Insurrection (2011)

== Current members ==
- Jo Amore- vocals
- Franck Milleliri - guitars
- JC "Jess" Lefevre - guitars
- Yves Campion - bass
- David Amore - drums
