= Dark at Dawn =

Band

Dark at Dawn is a power metal band from Germany, formed in 1993.

== Discography ==
=== Demos ===
- The Awakening (1993)
- As Daylight Fades (1994)
- Oceans of Time (1995)

=== EPs ===
- Noneternal (2012)

=== Albums ===
- Baneful Skies (1999)
- Crimson Frost (2001)
- First Beams of Light/Rediscovered Tracks (2002)
- Of Decay and Desire (2003)
- Dark at Dawn (2006)
