= Gutalax =

Czech goregrind band

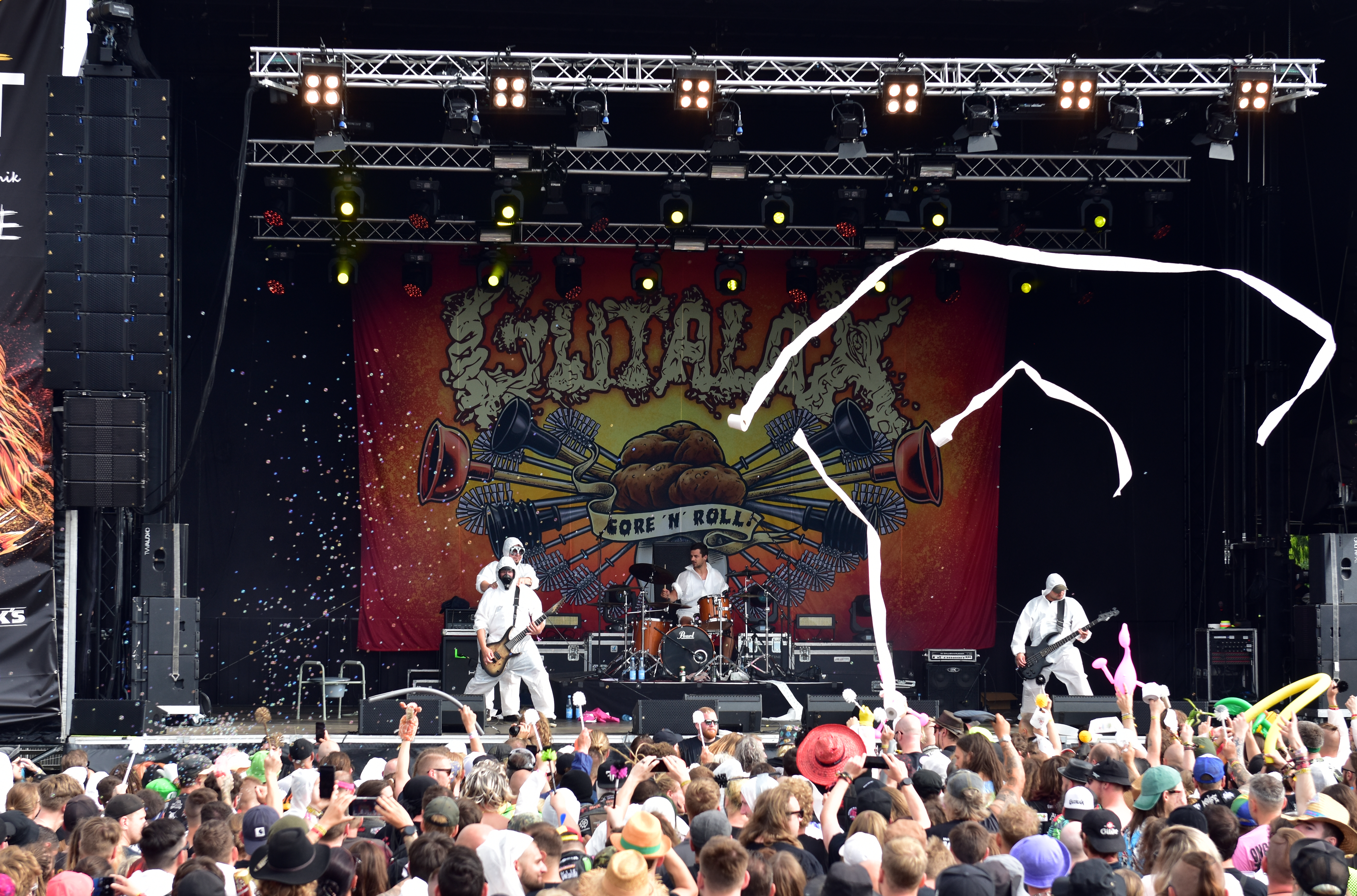
- Gutalax at Reload Festival in 2024

Background information
- Origin: Křemže, Czech Republic
- Genres: Grindcore; goregrind; pornogrind
- Years active: 2009–present
- Labels: Bizarre Leprous Production; Rotten Roll Rex
- Members: Martin "Maty" Matoušek; Pavel "Kebab" Troup; Tomáš "Kojas" Anderle; Petr "Mr. Free" Svoboda
- Past members: Petr "Průduch" Pour; Lukáš "Pouřík" Pour; Míra "Kohy" Kohout

Gutalax is a Czech goregrind band formed in 2009.

Průduch, Pouřík, Kebab, and Maty formed Gutalax in the spring of 2009. The band is named after the laxative Guttalax. By September of the same year, seven tracks were recorded for their debut split album with Italian band Cannibe. Their debut studio album, Shit Beast, was recorded in January 2011 and released on Czech label Bizarre Leprous Production. In early 2014, the band recorded their second album, Shit Happens, released in 2015 on German label Rotten Roll Rex. In 2021, they released their third album, The Shitpendables, via Rotten Roll Rex.

The band describes their style as "gore 'n' roll," a humorous mix of goregrind, groove metal and pornogrind. Their songs deal with feces and sex.

== Band members ==
=== Current ===
- Martin "Maty" Matoušek – vocals (2009–present)
- Pavel "Kebab" Troup – bass (2009–present)
- Tomáš "Kojas" Anderle – guitar (2010–present)
- Petr "Mr. Free" Svoboda – drums (2010–present)

=== Past ===
- Petr "Průduch" Pour – guitar (2009–2012)
- Lukáš "Pouřík" Pour – drums (2009–2012))
- Míra "Kohy" Kohout – guitar (2012–2019)

== Discography ==
=== Albums ===
- Shit Beast (2011)
- Shit Happens (2015)
- The Shitpendables (2021)

=== Split albums ===
- Telecockies (with Cannibe; 2010) — features material from the 2009 EP
- Shit Evolution (with Haemorrhage; 2013)
- The Anal Heros (with Spasm; 2017)

=== Live albums ===
- Live at Brutal Assault 2019 (2024)
- Live at Bloodstock 2023 (2025)

=== Video albums ===
- Art of Shitting (2017)

=== EPs ===
- Telecockies (2009)

=== Singles ===
- Dislocated Purple Stoma (Rompeprop cover) (2017)
- Shitbusters (2019)
- We Are What We Shit (2026)

=== Compilations ===
- Stinking Collection (2015)
- The Best (S)hits (2025)
