= Beautiful Sin =

Multinational power metal band

- Origin: Germany/Norway/Belgium/Sweden
- Genres: Power metal Heavy metal
- Years active: 2005–present
- Labels: AFM Records
- Members: Magali Luyten; Jørn Viggo Lofstad; Carl Johan Grimmark; Steinar Krokmo; Axel Mackenrott; Uli Kusch

Beautiful Sin was a European power metal band. It consisted of Jørn Voggo Lofstad, Steinar Krokmo, Magali Luyten, and Axel Mackenrott.

They were heavily influenced by the popular power metal band Helloween.

Beautiful Sin began when Uli Kusch met Belgian singer Magali Luyten, and wanted to record an album with her band. He agreed to produce a demo-CD for the band, but the recordings were never released.

A few years later, Uli was considering creating a new project next to Masterplan in which he would write all the music himself. In autumn of 2004 he began talking to Magali – this time about forming a band together.

Rounding out the rest of the line-up would be Pagan's Mind's Jørn Viggo Lofstad and Steinar Krokmo (coming from Uli's adopted home, Norway), and also Kusch's Masterplan-mate, Axel Mackenrott.

After the release of The Unexpected, Carl Johan Grimmark was added as a second guitarist.

== Line-up ==
- Magali Luyten – vocals
- Jørn Viggo Lofstad – guitars
- Steinar Krokmo – bass
- Axel Mackenrott – keyboards
- Uli Kusch – drums

== Discography ==
- The Unexpected (2006)
