= Kärbholz =

German punk/rock band

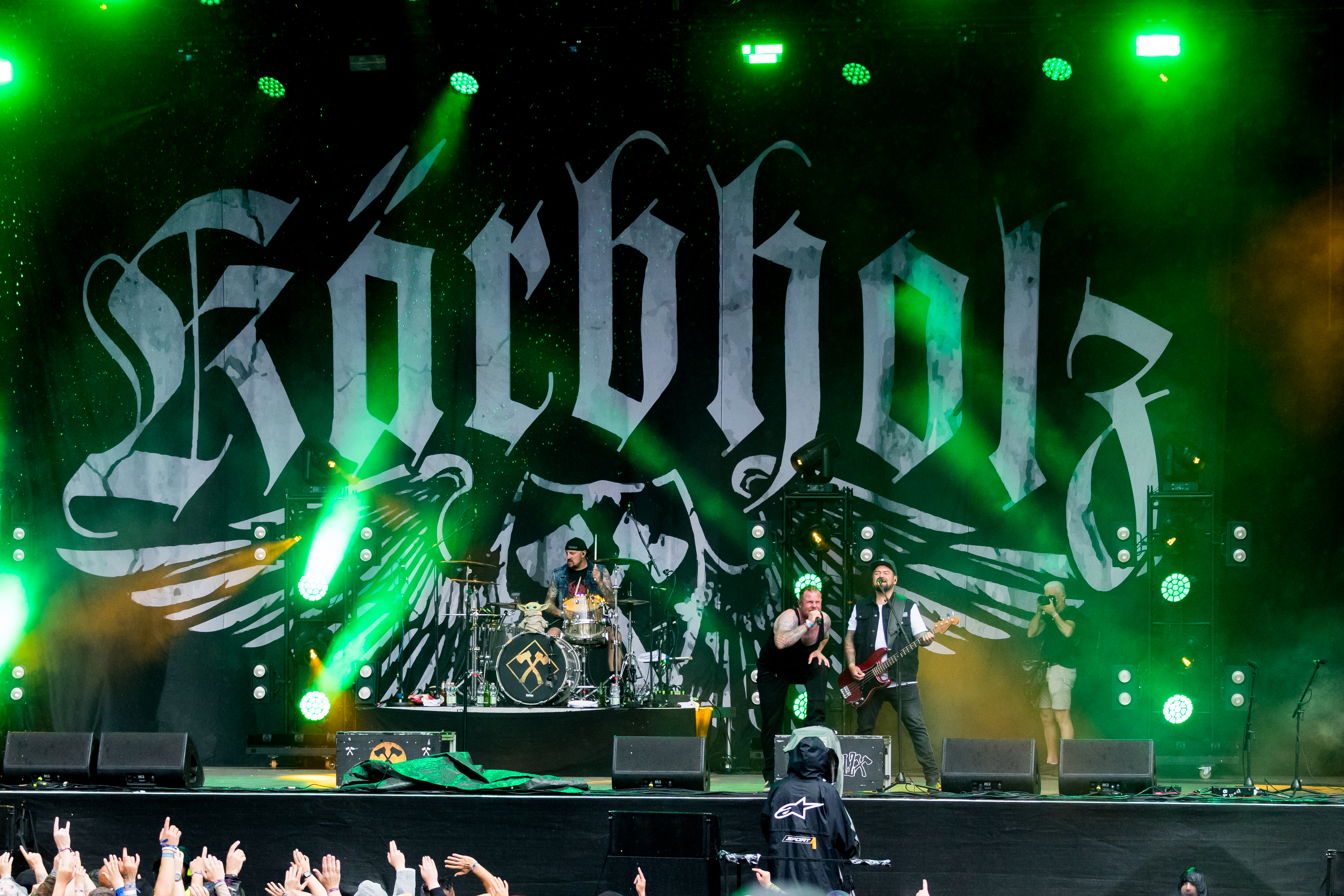
- Kärbholz performing in 2024

Background information
- Origin: Ruppichteroth, Germany
- Genres: Punk, German rock
- Years active: 2003–present
- Labels: Metalville
- Members: Torben Höffgen; Adrian Kühn; Stefan Wirths; Henning Münch
- Past members: Christian Steffens
- Website: kaerbholz.de

Kärbholz are a German indie-punk and rock band from Ruppichteroth, formed in 2003. The group has released seven albums.

== Band members ==
Kärbholz live at Rockharz Open Air 2019

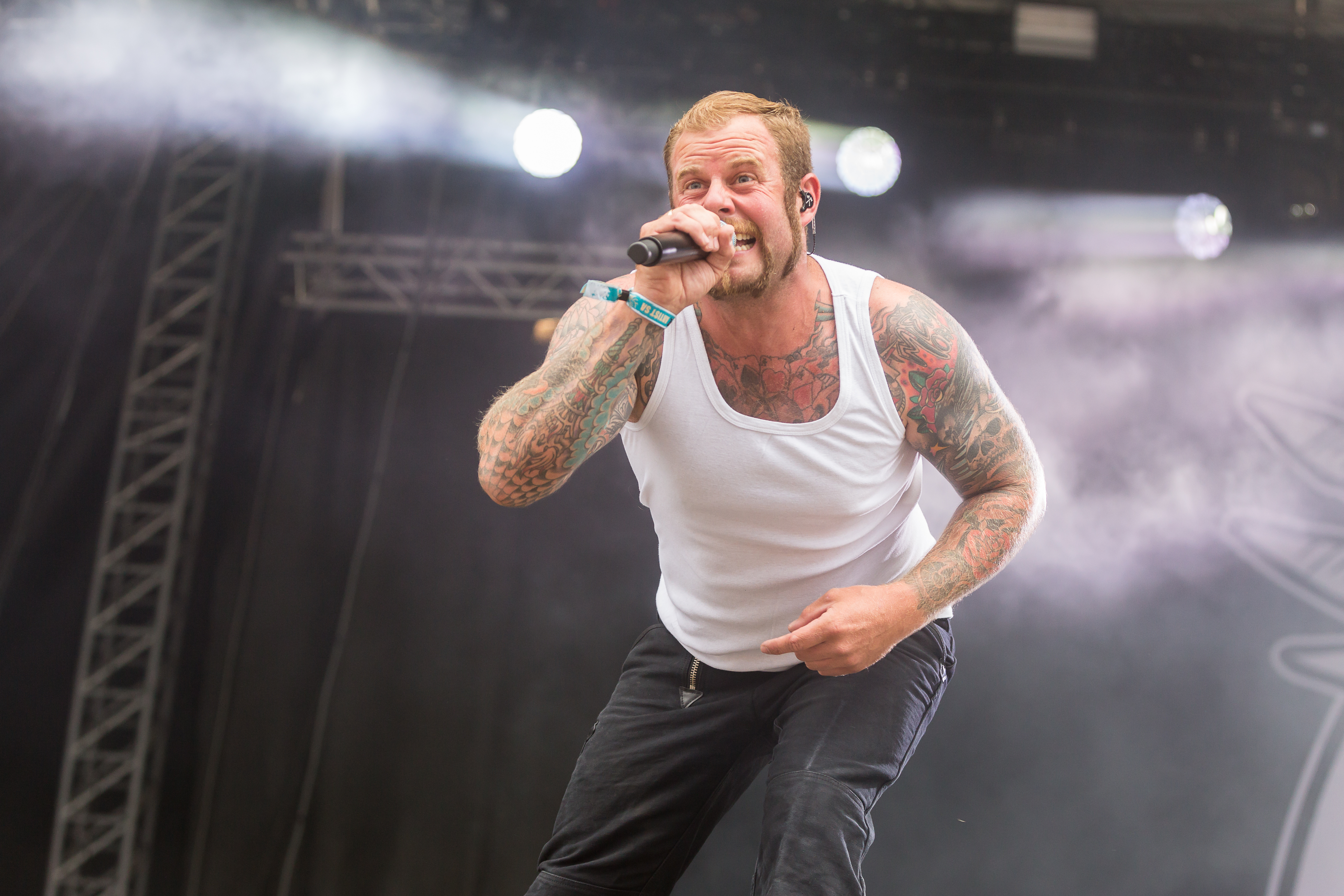
Singer Torben Höffgen

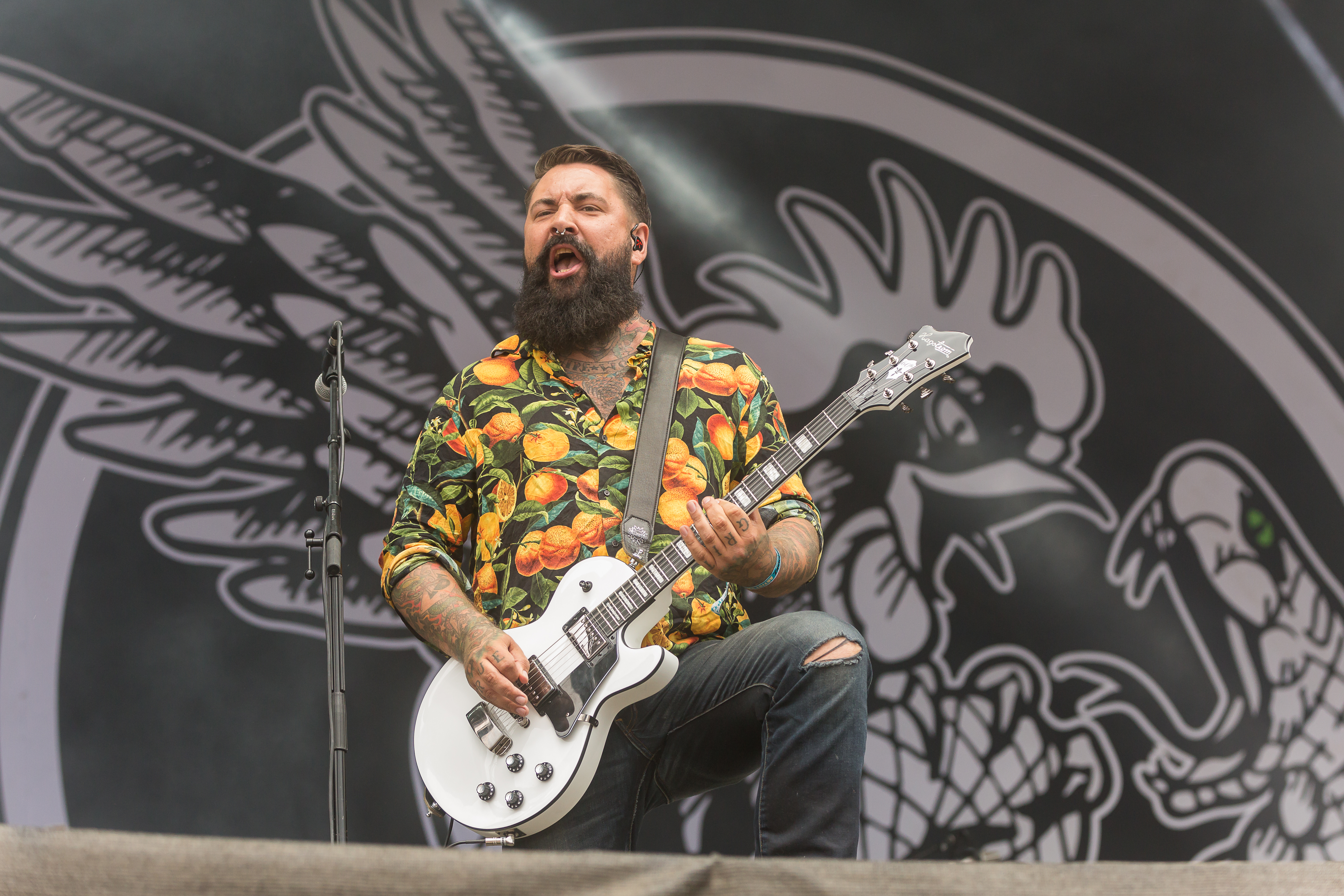
Guitarist Adrian Kühn

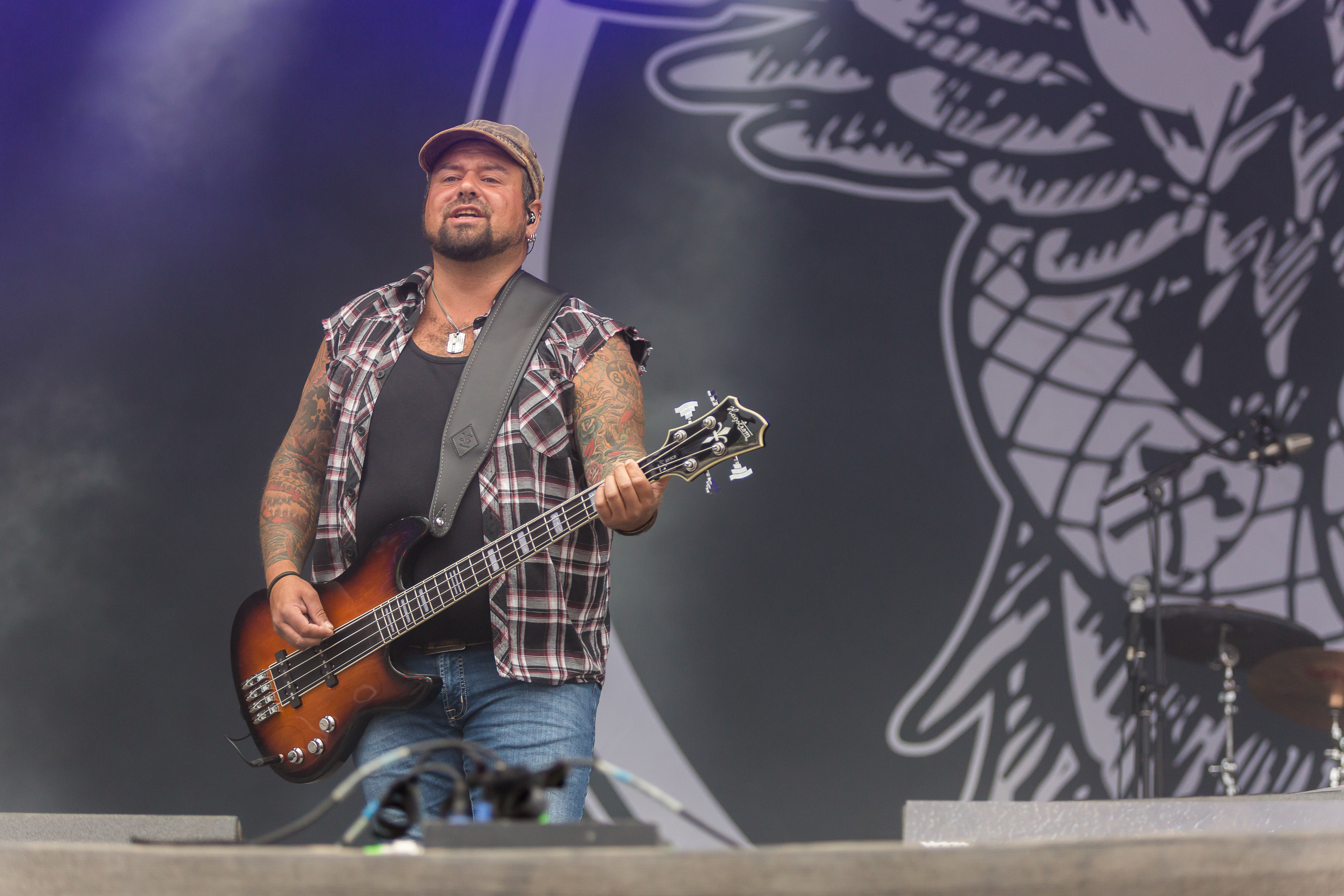
Bassist Stefan Wirths

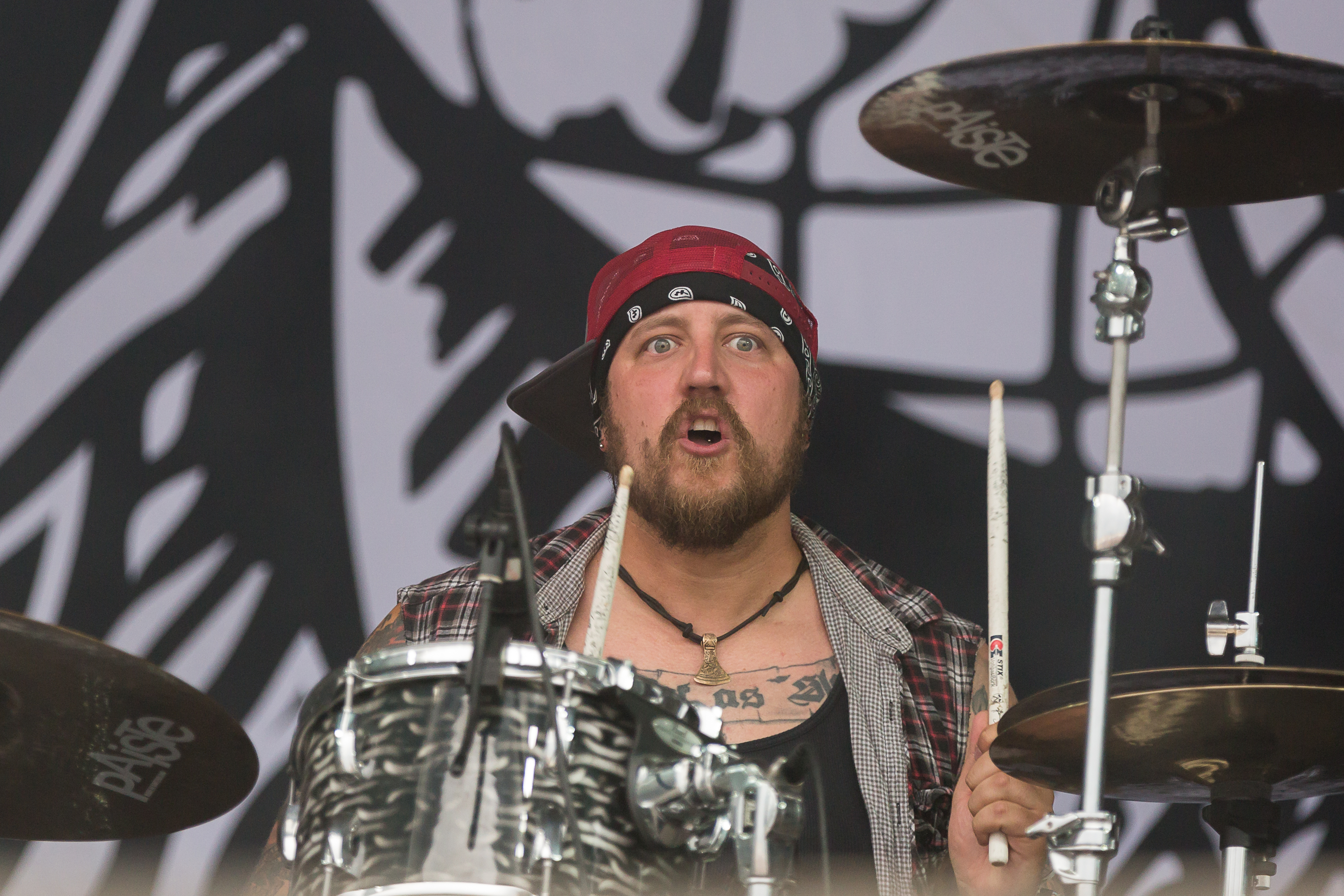
Drummer Henning Münch

== Discography ==
=== Albums ===
- 2006: Heimvorteil, split EP
- 2007: Spiel des Lebens (Asphalt Records), debut album
- 2008: Zurück nach vorn (Asphalt Records)
- 2008: Vollgas Rock'n'Roll (Asphalt Records), EP, reedition of Heimvorteil EP
- 2009: Mit Leib und Seele (Asphalt Records)
- 2011: 100% (Asphalt Records)
- 2013: Rastlos (Better Than Hell)
- 2015: Karma (Metalville)
- 2015: Karma – Live (Metalville)
- 2017: Überdosis Leben
- 2017: Spiel des Lebens – Alles neu (Metalville); reedition of Spiel des Lebens
- 2023: Kapitel 11: Barrikaden

=== Singles ===
- 2010: "Du bist König" (Asphalt Records)
- 2012: "Fallen & Fliegen" (Better Than Hell)
