= Armored Dawn =

Brazilian power metal band

Armored Dawn is a Brazilian power metal band from São Paulo.

== Select discography ==
- Power of Warrior (2016)
- Barbarians in Black (2018)
- Viking Zombie (2019)
- Brand New Way (2023)
