= Steve 'n' Seagulls =

Finnish bluegrass rock band

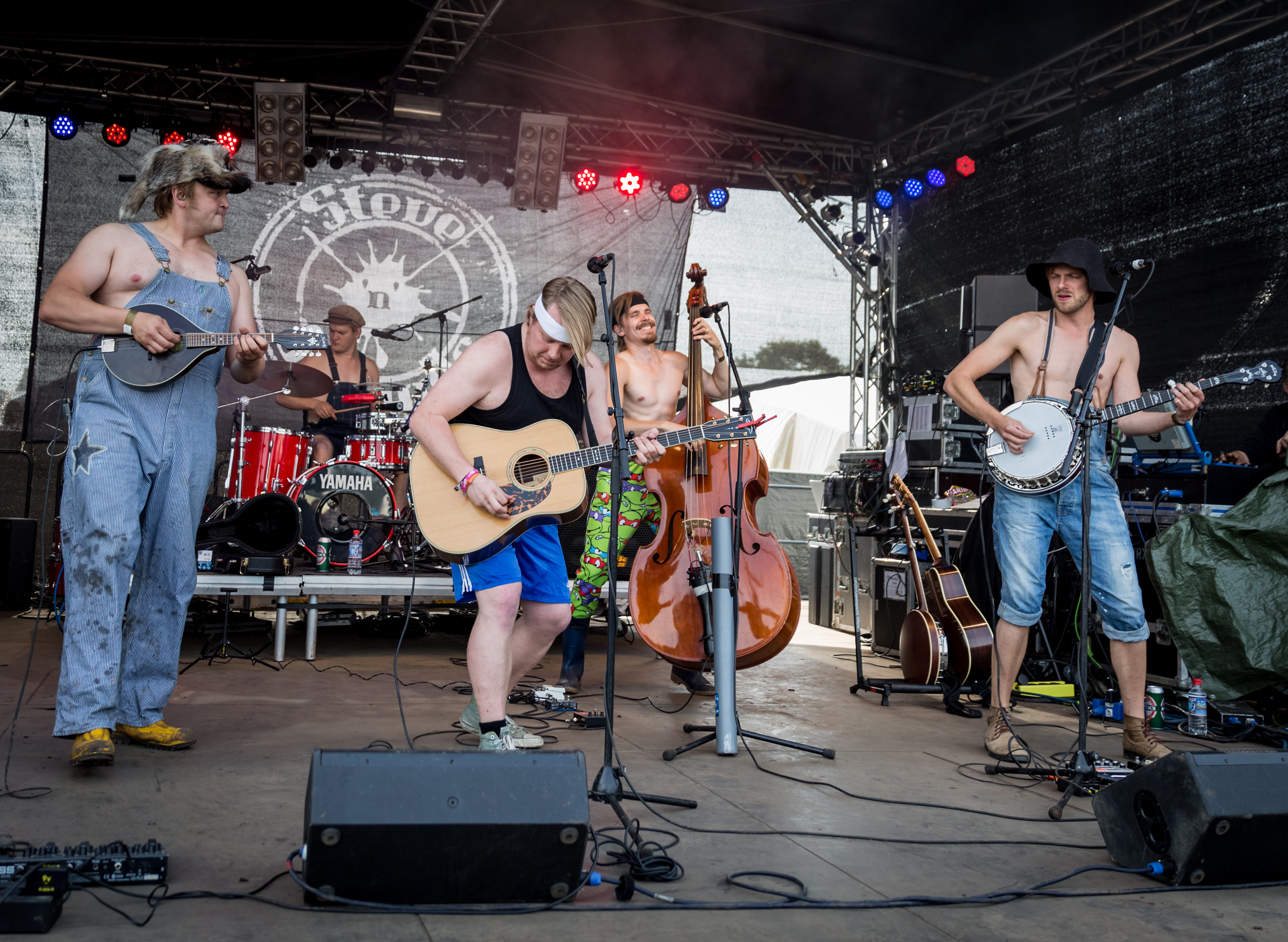
- Steve 'n' Seagulls live at Wacken Open Air 2015

Background information
- Origin: Jyväskylä, Finland
- Genres: Blues rock; hard rock; rockabilly
- Years active: 2011–present
- Label: Spinefarm Records
- Members: Remmel; Herman; Hiltunen; Luigi; Skubu
- Website: stevenseagulls.com

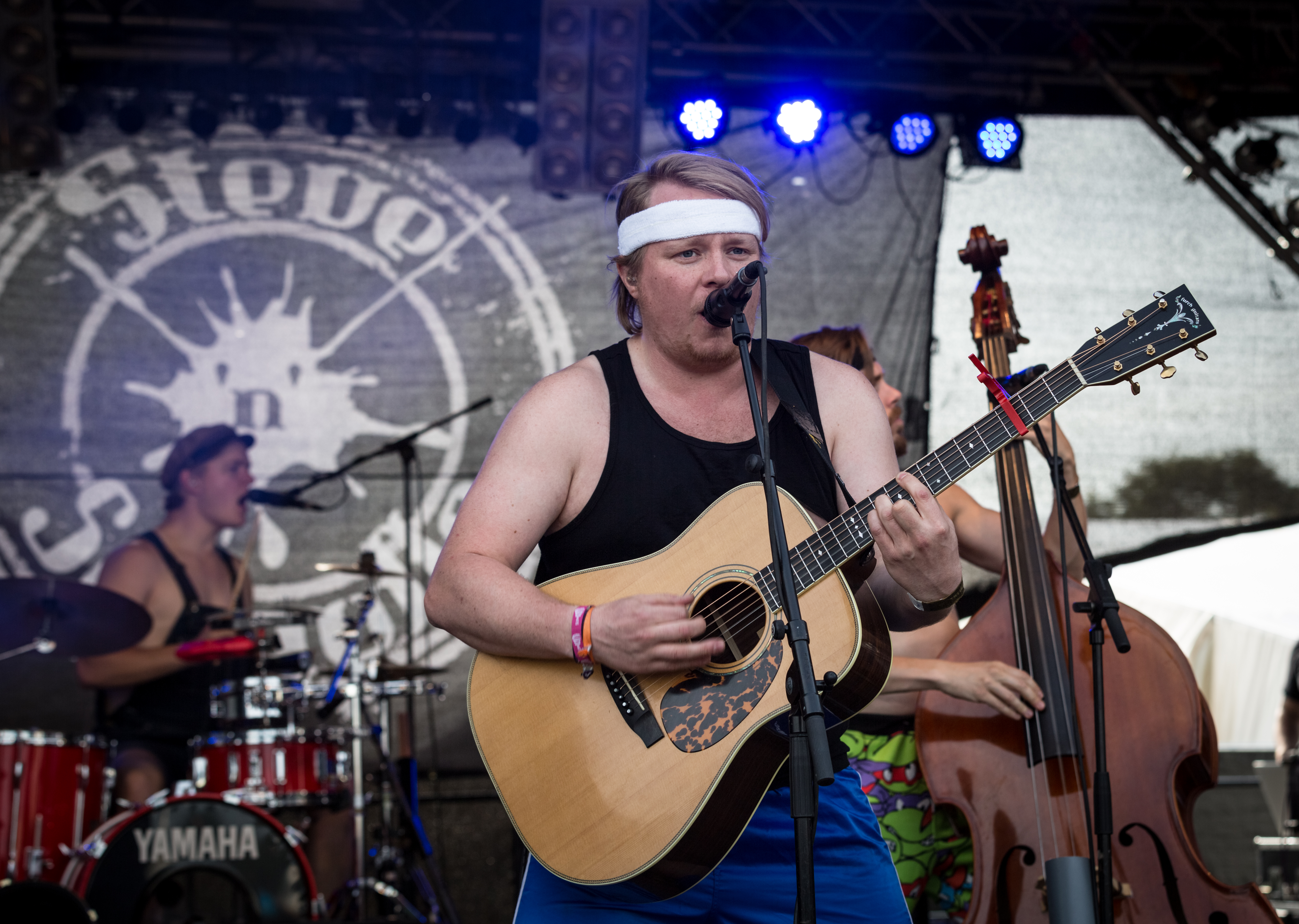
Steve 'n' Seagulls live at Wacken Open Air 2015

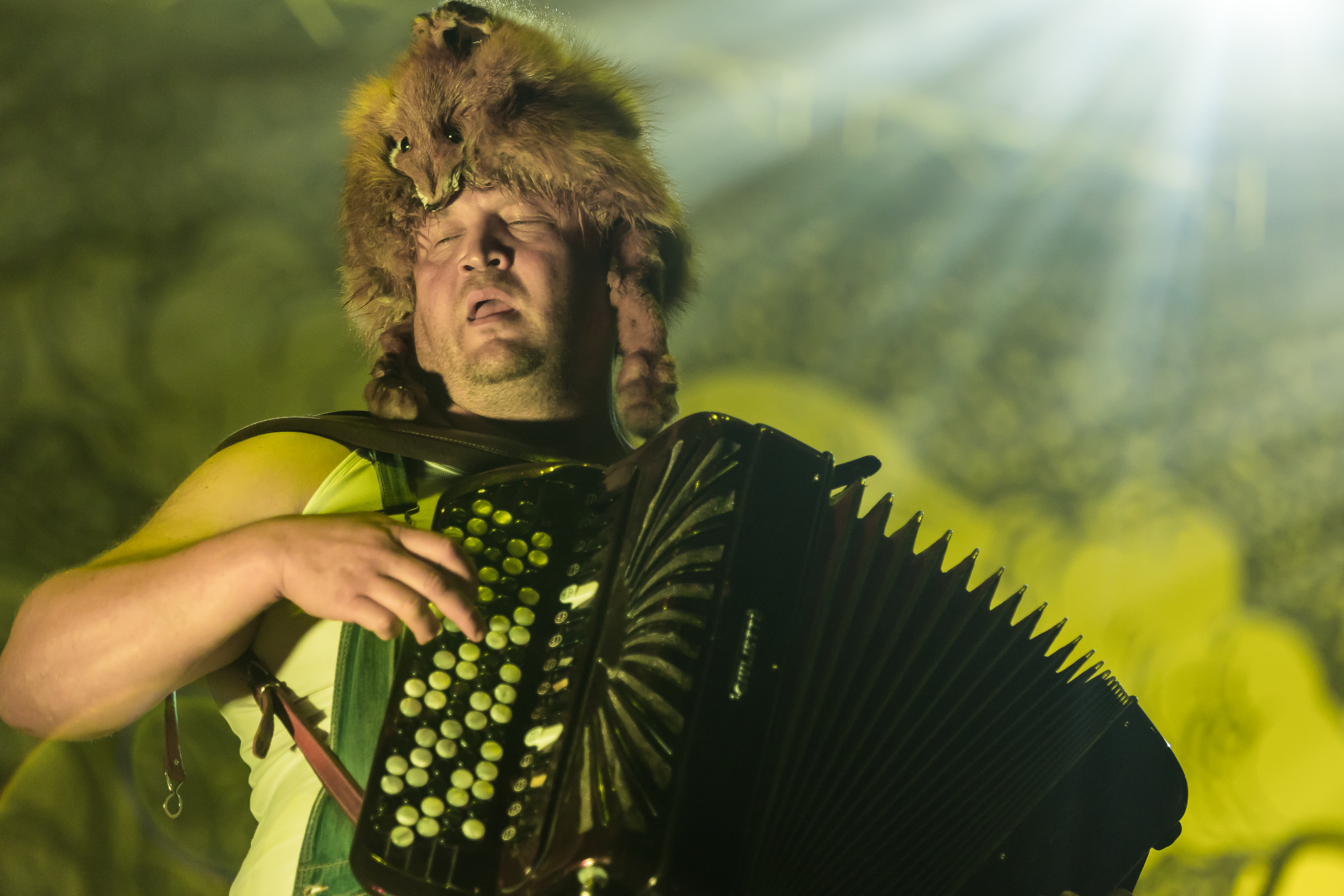
Wild Till Hiltunen at Rockharz 2026

Steve 'n' Seagulls is a Finnish country rock band, playing bluegrass versions of well-known hard rock and metal songs. The band became known in the summer of 2014 with the publication of videos on YouTube. Especially popular was the band's version of "Thunderstruck" by AC/DC, which has over 180 million views on YouTube. The band's debut album Farm Machine was released through Spinefarm Records on 8 May 2015. In November 2015, Steve 'n' Seagulls were featured on A.V. Undercover covering "Sabotage" by the Beastie Boys. On 3 August 2016 they released a cover of "Aces High" promoting their second album Brothers in Farms.

== Band members ==
Current members

- Remmel – vocals, acoustic guitar, balalaika, mandolin, anvil
- Herman – banjo, vocals, acoustic guitar
- Hiltunen – accordion, kantele, mandolin, keyboards, flute
- Luigi - Bass, vocals, accordion (2025 - present)
- Skubu – drums, percussion, vocals (2019–present)

Former members

- Pukki – double bass, vocals (until May 2019)
- Puikkonen – drums, percussion, vocals (until August 2019)
- Jamppa – double bass, fiddle, vocals (2019–2025)

== Discography ==
Albums

- Farm Machine (2015)
- Brothers in Farms (2016)
- Grainsville (2018)
- Another Miracle (2020)
- The Dark Side of the Moo (October 3, 2025)

Singles

- "The Trooper" (2014)
- "Holy Diver" (2014)
- "Thunderstruck" (2014)
- "You Shook Me All Night Long" (2015)
- "Seek and Destroy" (2015)
- "Run to the Hills" (2015)
- "Nothing Else Matters" (2015)
- "Cemetery Gates" (2015)
- "Black Dog" (2016)
- "Aces High" (2016)
- "November Rain" (2016)
- "Self Esteem" (2016)
- "It's a Long Way to the Top (If You Wanna Rock 'n' Roll)" (2017)
- "You Could Be Mine" (2017)
- "Antisocial" (2017)
