= Christophe Godin =

French guitarist and singer (born 1968)

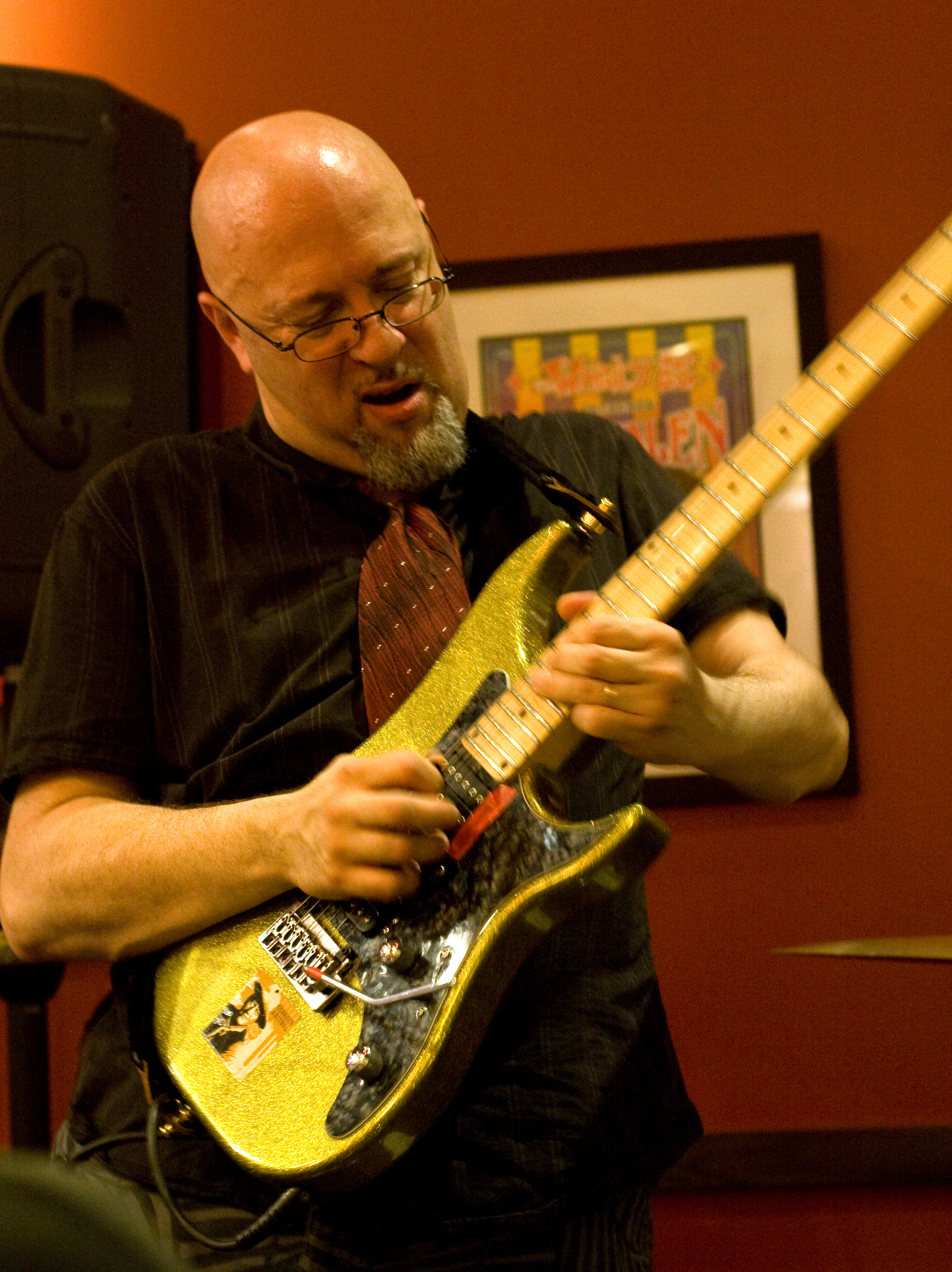
- Christophe Godin onstage with Morglbl somewhere in central New Jersey, May 2009.

Background information
- Born: 1968 (age 57–58); Annecy, France
- Genres: Blues rock Heavy metal Instrumental rock Jazz metal Classical rock
- Occupation: Guitarist
- Instruments: Guitar, Vocals

Christophe Godin (born 1968) is a French guitarist and singer, known for his work with the French bands Metal Kartoon, Gnô and Mörglbl. Godin plays a variety of styles, including heavy metal, jazz rock, blues rock and more.

== Biography ==
Christophe Godin was born in Annecy, France. He has toured with some famous musicians, like Ron "Bumblefoot" Thal (Guns N' Roses), Andy Timmons (Danger Danger), Mattias Eklundh (Freak Kitchen), Kiko Loureiro (Angra, Megadeth), Guthrie Govan, etc. Mörglbl shared the stage with Liquid Tension Experiment (3/5 of Dream Theater plus Tony Levin on bass) at US biggest indoor prog festival, NEARfest in 2008 for the festival's 10th anniversary. He also played with Paul Gilbert (Mr. Big), Frank Gambale (Chick Corea), Jennifer Batten (Michael Jackson).

Godin's performances often incorporate humor and high-tempo guitar techniques. In live covers of "Little Wing," he has been noted for using sweep picking to play arpeggiated chords while simultaneously performing vocals. In addition to his solo career, he works as a guitar clinician and instructor internationally. His compositions and session work span multiple genres, including metal and jazz.

Christophe Godin began his musical journey as a local guitar hero in several bands which, unfortunately, never left any trace.

In 1995, with Temple, Christophe played on an album that was properly distributed in France and received a wave of positive reviews.

In 1996, he took part on Guitare Attitudes, a compilation featuring French guitarists, that allowed him to regularly appear on the French TV show Nulle Part Ailleurs (Canal +) as a guest guitarist.

In 1997, he created, along with Ivan Rougny and Jean-Pierre Frelézeau, the Mörglbl Trio !! and released two albums ("The Mörglbl Trio !!" in 1998 and "Bienvenue à Mörglbl Land" in 1999). With this band, the doors to international distribution finally opened. In the meantime, Christophe, who's been a teacher at the E.T.M. of Geneva, Switzerland, since 1994, acquired a solid reputation as a guitar instructor with the release of an instructional video (Heavy metal : les techniques) and the multitude of articles he wrote for dozens of guitar magazines in France, Germany and the UK. He became a regular guest at the prestigious M.A.I. of Nancy in France, and runs master-classes everywhere on the planet.

In 2001, he created Gnô, with Gabriel Vegh (bass/vocals) and Peter Puke (drums/vocals), and released "Trash Deluxe". Gnô was on tour intensively throughout France until 2003. Finally, simultaneously with his duo with Pierrejean Gaucher (the 2G, playing Frank Zappa covers alongside their original material), Christophe, released his solo project named Christophe Godin's Metal Kartoon, where all the ingredients that made the career of the guitarist what it is are to be found on this record: humour, virtuosity, and a mix of jazz, funk and metal.

Now simply named "Morglbl", the band released their sixth album Tea Time For Pünks on 26 May 2015. Christophe has toured intensively with the band all over the world including è US Tours, one China Tour, and performances all over the world. In 2018, the band releases their last album entitled "The Störy of Scott Rötti". In 2020, Christophe Godin launches a new project with Belgian singer extraordinaire Maggy Luyten, also feat Ivan Rougny and Aurel Ouzoulias. The band begins touring in 2021, and their first album "The Prize" is released in 2022.

Godin also performs in an acoustic guitar duo with guitarist Oliver-Roman Garcia.

In November 2024, The Prize disbanded and Christophe went solo in 2025 with the release of Dancing in a Minefield Vol 1 & 2, and in 2026 the LP Dancing in a Minefield (MezigRec and Laser CD for the US). His current band, Christophe Godin & The Odd Souls includes Lynn Marring (Bass, vocals), Pierre Michel (Guitar, vocals) and Peter Puke (Drums, vocals).

Godin was voted fifth best international guitarist by Guitar Part magazine. He also ranked 74 in Guitar Xtreme Magazine's list of 100 of the most influential guitarists in 2024.

Christophe is an official international ambassador and tours worldwide for the following companies : Laney amps (UK), Vigier guitars (France), Savarez Strings (France), Right on Straps (Spain), Cole Clark acoustic guitars (Australia), Zoom effects (Japan), Palmer effects (Germany), Sommer Cables (Germany).

== Discography ==
Temple

- Temple (1995)

Mörglbl

- The Mörglbl Trio!! (1998)
- Bienvenue à Mörglbl Land (1999)
- Grötesk (2007)
- Toon Tunes from the Past (2008)
- Jäzz for the Deaf (2009)
- Brütal Römance (2012)
- Tea Time For Pünks (2015)
- The Story of Scott Rötti (2019)

The Prize

- The Prize (2022)

Wax'In

- Wax'In (2016)

Gnô

- Trash Deluxe (2001)
- Cannibal Tango (2011)
- Crass Palace (2013)

Christophe Godin

- Christophe Godin's Metal Kartoon (2005)
- Dancing in a Minefield Vol.1 EP (2025)
- Dancing in a Minefield Vol.2 EP (2025)
- Dancing in a Minefield LP (MezigRec - 2026)

Collaborations / Duos

- Christophe Chambert - The Family (1999)
- Rob Van Der Loo's Freak Neils Inc. (2004)
- 2G - Pierrejean Gaucher / Christophe Godin (2007)
- Samuel Arkan's Origins (2010)
- Christophe Godin & Olivier-Roman Garcia (2014)

Compilations

- Guitare attitudes rock influences (1996)
- Pour une Terre sans mines (1998)
