= Debauchery (band) =

German death metal band

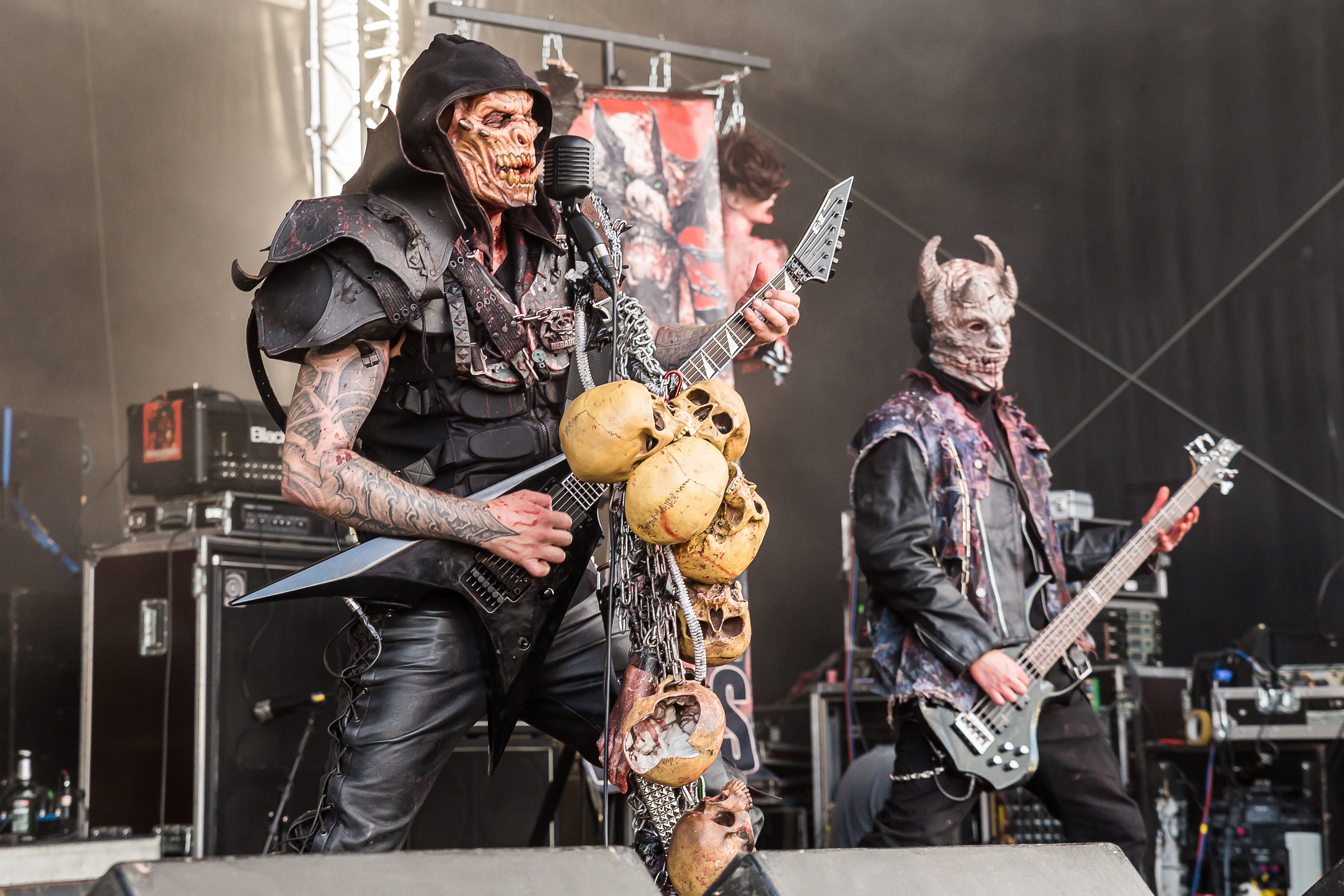
- Debauchery live in 2018

Background information
- Also known as: Maggotcunt
- Origin: Stuttgart, Germany
- Genres: Death metal, death 'n' roll
- Years active: 2000–present
- Labels: Nuclear Blast, Massacre Records
- Website: debauchery.de

Debauchery is a German death metal band from Stuttgart.

== History ==
Founded in 2000 as Maggotcunt before changing their name in 2002, Debauchery was formed by current vocalist, guitarist and bass guitarist Thomas Gurrath and former drummer Dani.

The band's themes of war and death often involve the fictional god Khorne, from the science fiction universe Warhammer 40,000, and its followers.

Gurrath was a philosophy teacher at a Stuttgart high school until his role in Debauchery was discovered in May 2010. Given the choice between keeping his teaching job or his band, he chose the latter.

== Members ==
Debauchery live at Metal Frenzy 2018 in Gardelegen

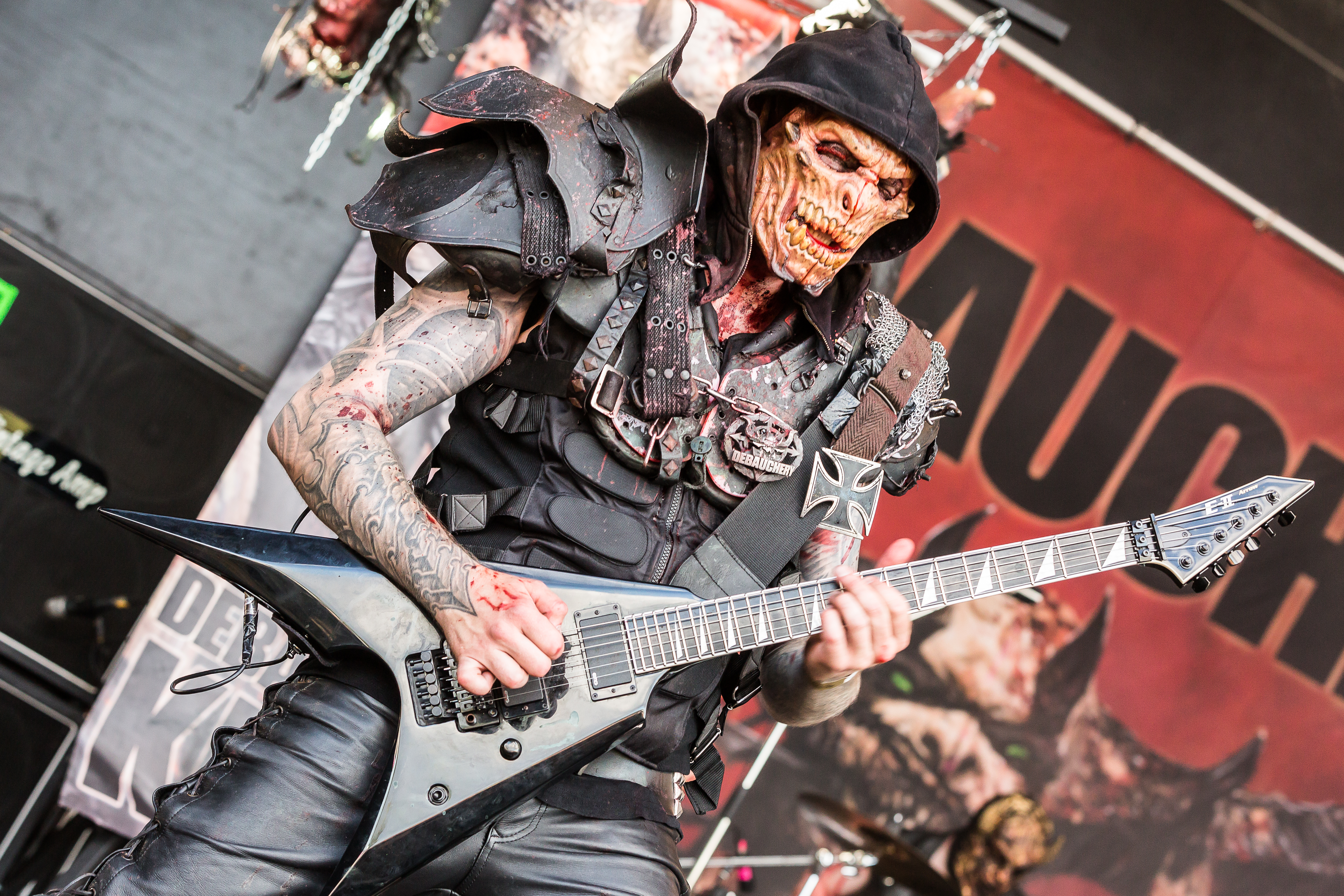
Thomas Gurrath

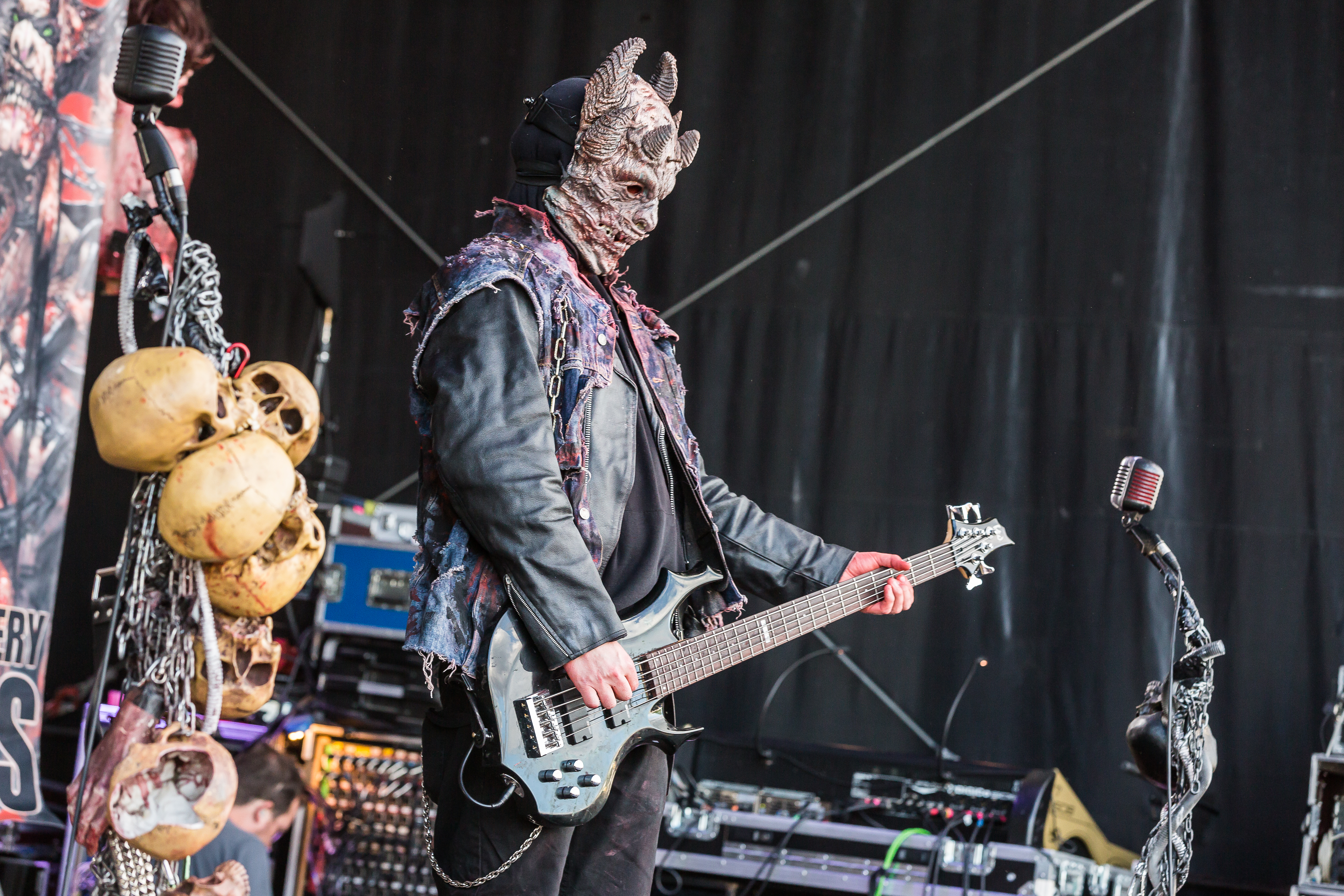
Dennis Ward

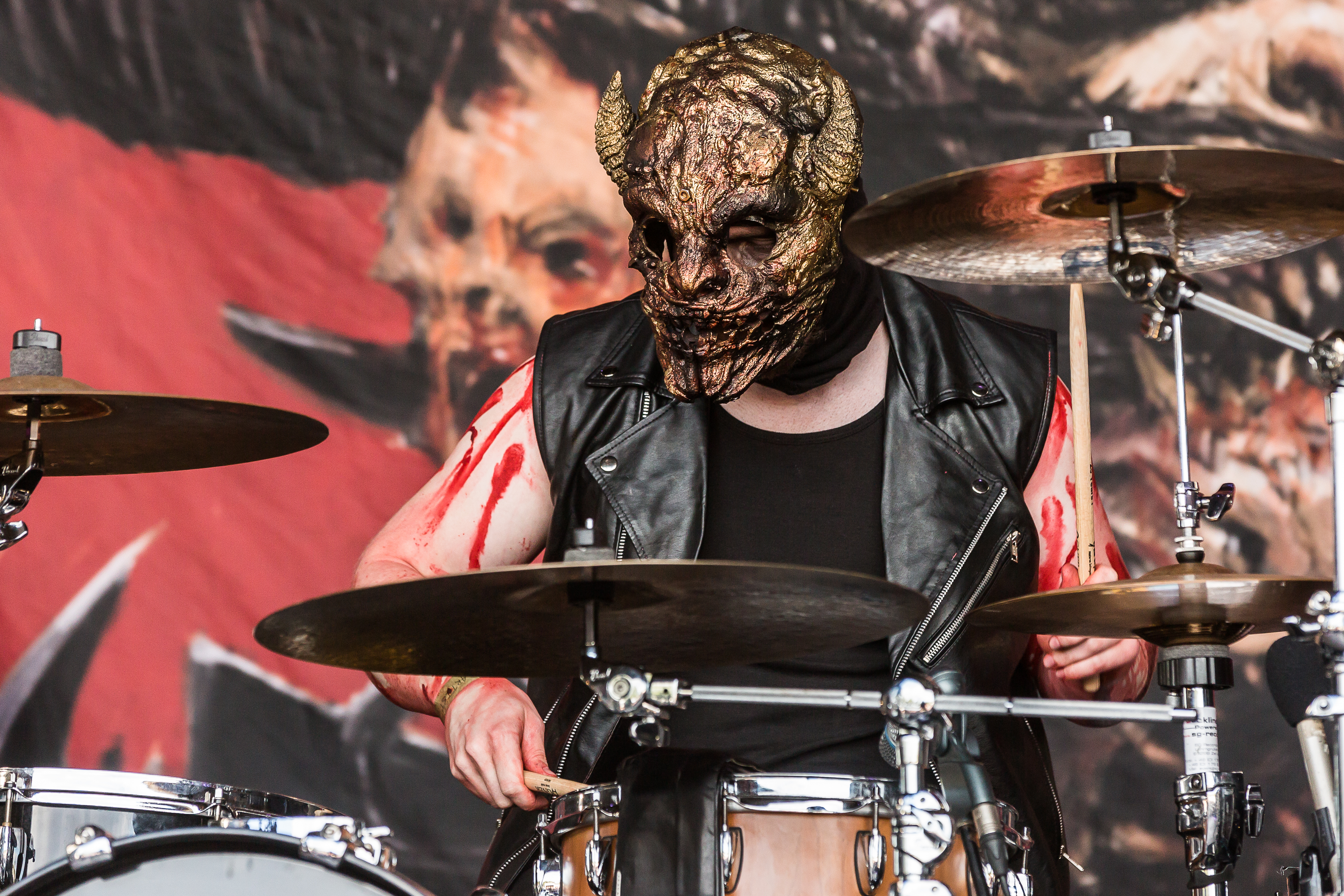
Oliver Zellmann

Current

- Thomas "The Bloodbeast" Gurrath – vocals, guitars
- Dennis "The Bloodpriest" Ward – bass guitar
- Oliver "The Bloodhammer" Zellmann – drums

Former

- Ronald Squier – drums
- Dani – drums

Additional musicians

- Tomasz – drums
- Joshi – guitars
- Simon Dorn – guitars
- Marc Juttner – bass guitar
- Thomas Naumann – guitars
- Günther Werno – keyboards

== Discography ==
- Kill Maim Burn, 2003
- Rage of the Bloodbeast, 2004
- Torture Pit, 2005
- Kill Maim Burn Re-Release, 2006
- Back in Blood, 2007
- Continue to Kill, 2008
- Rockers & War, 2009
- Germany's Next Death Metal, 2011
- Kings of Carnage, 2013
- Fuck Humanity, 2015
- Thunderbeast, 2016
- Blood for the Blood God, 2019 (compilation)
- Monster Metal, 2021
- Demons of Rock 'n' Roll, 2022
- Dragongods, 2024
