= 2008 in heavy metal music =

This is a timeline documenting the events of heavy metal in the year 2008.

== Bands formed ==
- A Sound of Thunder
- A Storm of Light
- Aeon Zen
- Allegaeon
- Amaranthe
- Arkaea
- Austrian Death Machine
- Betraying the Martyrs
- Bölzer
- Bombus
- Cain's Offering
- Chickenfoot
- Christian Mistress
- City of Fire
- Clown Core
- Code Orange
- Ex Deo
- From Fall to Spring
- God Seed
- Hamferð
- Heldmaschine
- Holy Grail
- Imagine Dragons
- King of Asgard
- Krypts
- Lustre
- Pallbearer
- Power Trip
- Revolution Renaissance
- Solution .45
- The Empire Shall Fall
- Triptykon
- Uneven Structure

== Reformed bands ==
- At the Gates (for a few shows)
- Carcass (for touring)
- Einherjer (for touring)
- Exhorder (for a few tours and some new material)
- Forbidden (for a few shows)
- Krokus
- Living Sacrifice
- Spineshank

== Disbandments ==
- Alabama Thunderpussy
- Beneath the Sky
- Byzantine
- Celtic Frost
- Dead to Fall
- Demigod
- The Duskfall
- Flactorophia (sole member died)
- From Autumn to Ashes
- Himsa
- Knorkator
- Ministry
- Sieges Even
- Sikth
- Still Remains
- The Red Death
- The Agony Scene
- Remove the Veil
- Vomitorial Corpulence

== Events ==
- Twiggy Ramirez rejoins Marilyn Manson in early January.
- Mikael Åkerfeldt rejoins Bloodbath in late January.
- Ola Frenning leaves Soilwork in February.
- Chris Broderick joins Megadeth in February.
- Timo Tolkki leaves Stratovarius after some internal troubles in March.
- Thomas Gabriel Fischer leaves Celtic Frost in April.
- Singer Lisa Middelhauve leaves Xandria in April.
- On April 19, during a gothic rock and culture celebration, the Factory nightclub fire in Quito kills 19 and injures at least 24.
- On May 11, original Rush drummer John Rutsey died in his sleep from an apparent heart attack.
- Blasphemer leaves Mayhem in May.
- Mike Kimball leaves Dying Fetus in May.
- On July 27, former White Spirit and Tank drummer Graeme Crallan died after a fall in a London street.
- Wes Borland joins Marilyn Manson's lineup in mid-August.
- D.R.I. guitarist Spike Cassidy makes a full recovery from cancer.
- Snot reforms with ex-Divine Heresy vocalist Tommy Vext.
- Michael Nicklasson leaves Dark Tranquillity in August.
- Jeff Singer leaves Paradise Lost in August.
- Christian "Witchhunter" Dudek, ex-drummer of Sodom, dies of liver failure on September 7.
- Christian Älvestam leaves Scar Symmetry in September.
- Peter Wichers rejoins Soilwork in September.
- Tormentor rejoins Gorgoroth in September, as does Pest in December.
- Denny Axelsson, vocalist of Blinded Colony, leaves the band.
- Former Marilyn Manson bassist Gidget Gein dies of a heroin overdose.
- Josh Freese plans to depart from Nine Inch Nails by the end of 2008.
- John Kempainen leaves The Black Dahlia Murder in December.
- Job For A Cowboy founding member and guitarist Ravi Bhadriraju leaves the band in late 2008.
- Al Glassman leaves Despised Icon to join Job For A Cowboy.
- Gaahl (ex-Gorgoroth) reveals his homosexuality.

== Albums released ==
=== January ===
Day	Artist	Album
2	In Mourning	Shrouded Divine
8	For the Fallen Dreams	Changes
11	Benedictum	Seasons of Tragedy
22	Byzantine	Oblivion Beckons
22	The Red Death	Godmakers
22	With Blood Comes Cleansing	Horror
25	Alestorm	Captain Morgan's Revenge
25	Avantasia	The Scarecrow
25	Ayreon	01011001
25	Brainstorm	Downburst
28	Bullet for My Valentine	Scream Aim Fire
28	Heaven Shall Burn	Iconoclast
29	Decrepit Birth	Diminishing Between Worlds
29	Protest the Hero	Fortress

=== February ===
Day	Artist	Album
4	Baptism	Grim Arts of Melancholy
4	Hate	Morphosis
4	Iron Maiden	Live After Death
4	Sworn Enemy	Maniacal
5	Black Tusk	Passage Through Purgatory
5	Brain Drill	Apocalyptic Feasting
5	Salt the Wound	Carnal Repercussions
5	Warbringer	War Without End
5	Winds of Plague	Decimate the Weak
8	Behexen	My Soul for His Glory
12	Texas Hippie Coalition	Pride of Texas
13	Norther	N
15	Eluveitie	Slania
18	Hellhammer	Demon Entrails
18	To-Mera	Delusions
19	Ascension of the Watchers	Numinosum
19	Dead to Fall	Are You Serious?
19	Genghis Tron	Board Up the House
19	Hate Eternal	Fury & Flames
19	Sculptured	Embodiment: Collapsing Under the Weight of God
19	Virgin Black	Requiem – Fortissimo
22	Exciter	Thrash Speed Burn
22	Metalium	Incubus - Chapter Seven
22	Nortt	Galgenfrist
22	Steel Attack	Carpe DiEnd
22	Stormwarrior	Heading Northe
22	Rage	Carved in Stone
22	Unheilig	Puppenspiel
25	Architects and Dead Swans	Spilt (EP)
25	Dark Fortress	Eidolon
25	Dark Suns	Grave Human Genuine
26	Death Angel	Killing Season
26	MyChildren MyBride	Unbreakable
26	myGRAIN	Signs of Existence
29	Agalloch	The White
29	Draconian	Turning Season Within

=== March ===
Day	Artist	Album
2	Nine Inch Nails	Ghosts I–IV
3	Azaghal	Omega
4	Nasum	Doombringer
4	Our Last Night	The Ghosts Among Us
7	Boris	Smile
7	Meshuggah	obZen
8	Scarlet Sins	Scarlet Sins
9	Buckethead	From the Coop
10	Bloodbath	Unblessing the Purity
11	Zimmer's Hole	When You Were Shouting at the Devil...
12	Shade Empire	Zero Nexus
18	Black Tide	Light from Above
18	Bury Your Dead	Bury Your Dead
19	The Black Mages	The Black Mages III: Darkness and Starlight
19	Hypocrisy	Catch 22 (V2.0.08) (Re-release)
20	Cataract	Cataract
21	Firewind	The Premonition
21	Jon Oliva's Pain	Global Warning
21	Korpiklaani	Korven Kuningas
24	Cavalera Conspiracy	Inflikted
25	Mercenary	Architect of Lies
28	Illdisposed	The Prestige
28	Kamelot	Ghost Opera: The Second Coming
29	Dream Theater	Greatest Hit (...and 21 Other Pretty Cool Songs)
31	Strapping Young Lad	1994–2006 Chaos Years

=== April ===
Day	Artist	Album
1	Dismember	Dismember
1	Origin	Antithesis
1	Sevendust	Chapter VII: Hope & Sorrow
1	Septic Flesh	Communion
1	The Sword	Gods of the Earth
1	Theory of a Deadman	Scars & Souvenirs
4	In Flames	A Sense of Purpose
7	Children of Bodom	Blooddrunk
8	P.O.D.	When Angels & Serpents Dance
14	Mirrorthrone	Gangrene
15	Arsis	We Are the Nightmare
15	Belphegor	Bondage Goat Zombie
15	Destroy the Runner	I, Lucifer
15	The Ghost Inside	Fury and the Fallen Ones
15	Embrace the End	Ley Lines
15	Thine Eyes Bleed	Thine Eyes Bleed
18	Tiamat	Amanethes
21	Grave	Dominion VIII
22	Dominici	O3: A Trilogy, Part Three
22	Story of the Year	The Black Swan
22	Whitesnake	Good to be Bad
22	Long Suffering, Rehumanize, Corpse Under Construction, Eternal Mystery	4-Way Noise Explosion
23	Kalmah	For the Revolution
25	Def Leppard	Songs from the Sparkle Lounge
25	Warrel Dane	Praises to the War Machine
28	Deicide	Till Death Do Us Part
28	My Dying Bride	An Ode to Woe
29	Sea of Treachery	At Daggers Drawn
29	Testament	The Formation of Damnation
30	Moonsorrow	Tulimyrsky

=== May ===
Day	Artist	Album
5	Nine Inch Nails	The Slip
5	Scott Kelly	The Wake
5	Textures	Silhouettes
6	Kayo Dot	Blue Lambency Downward
6	Revocation	Empire of the Obscene
6	Russian Circles	Station
13	Abysmal Dawn	Programmed To Consume
13	Aletheian	Dying Vine
13	Emmure	The Respect Issue
13	Mourning Beloveth	A Disease for the Ages
14	Diablo	Icaros
16	Moonspell	Night Eternal
23	Cryptopsy	The Unspoken King
23	Kataklysm	Prevail
26	Ihsahn	angL
26	Shai Hulud	Misanthropy Pure
30	Communic	Payment of Existence
30	Hollenthon	Opus Magnum
30	Opeth	Watershed
30	Pyramaze	Immortal
30	Sabaton	The Art of War

=== June ===
Day	Artist	Album
2	Bloodbath	The Wacken Carnage
2	Disturbed	Indestructible
2	Satyricon	My Skin Is Cold
9	Gama Bomb	Citizen Brain
9	Unleashed	Hammer Battalion
9	Venom	Hell
10	Inhale Exhale	I Swear...
10	Nachtmystium	Assassins: Black Meddle, Part 1
11	Ari Koivunen	Becoming
13	Grand Magus	Iron Will
13	Judas Priest	Nostradamus
16	Cult of Luna	Eternal Kingdom
16	Exit Ten	Remember the Day
17	Mötley Crüe	Saints of Los Angeles
20	Scar Symmetry	Holographic Universe
24	Aborted	Strychnine.213
24	Beneath the Sky	The Day the Music Died
24	Carnifex	The Diseased and the Poisoned
27	Equilibrium	Sagas
29	Khold	Hundre År Gammal
30	Raunchy	Wasteland Discotheque

=== July ===
Day	Artist	Album
1	Lamb of God	Walk with Me in Hell
7	Blaze Bayley	The Man Who Would Not Die
7	Stone Gods	Silver Spoons & Broken Bones
8	Cannibal Corpse	Centuries of Torment: The First 20 Years
8	Whitechapel	This Is Exile
14	Daylight Dies	Lost to the Living
18	Chrome Division	Booze, Broads and Beelzebub
18	Fear My Thoughts	Isolation
21	Krisiun	Southern Storm
22	Misery Signals	Controller
22	Neuraxis	The Thin Line Between
22	Nine Inch Nails	The Slip
22	War of Ages	Arise and Conquer
25	Argoz (MX)	Argoz (EP)
27	Chelsea Grin	Chelsea Grin (EP)
29	Soulfly	Conquer
29	Dr. Acula	Below Me

=== August ===
Day	Artist	Album
5	Norma Jean	The Anti Mother
12	Extreme	Saudades de Rock
19	The Acacia Strain	Continent
19	The Human Abstract	Midheaven
19	Machinae Supremacy	Overworld
19	The Showdown	Back Breaker
19	Staind	The Illusion of Progress
20	DragonForce	Ultra Beatdown
20	Slipknot	All Hope Is Gone
22	Oomph!	Monster
25	Into Eternity	The Incurable Tragedy
26	Motörhead	Motörizer
29	Angband	Rising from Apadana
29	Destruction	D.E.V.O.L.U.T.I.O.N.
29	Haggard	Tales of Ithiria
25	Acid Drinkers	Verses of Steel

=== September ===
Day	Artist	Album
1	The Berzerker	The Reawakening
1	Volbeat	Guitar Gangsters & Cadillac Blood
1	Welicoruss	WinterMoon Symphony
2	Blessed by a Broken Heart	Pedal to the Metal
5	All Shall Perish	Awaken the Dreamers
5	Iced Earth	The Crucible of Man
9	Brian "Head" Welch	Save Me From Myself
12	Metallica	Death Magnetic
16	All That Remains	Overcome
16	Andromeda	The Immunity Zone
16	Avenged Sevenfold	Live in the LBC & Diamonds in the Rough
16	Intronaut	Prehistoricisms
16	Obituary	Left to Die
17	Amon Amarth	Twilight of the Thunder God
17	Swallow the Sun	Plague of Butterflies
17	The Haunted	Versus
19	Evergrey	Torn
19	Falchion	Chronicles of the Dead
19	Sonic Syndicate	Love and Other Disasters
22	Omnium Gatherum	The Redshift
23	Metal Church	This Present Wasteland
24	Battlelore	The Last Alliance
26	Holy Moses	Agony of Death
26	Psycroptic	Ob(Servant)
29	Bring Me the Horizon	Suicide Season
29	Enslaved	Vertebrae
29	Dagoba	Face The Colossus
30	Bleeding Through	Declaration
30	Dream Theater	Chaos in Motion 2007–2008
30	In This Moment	The Dream
30	Jeff Loomis	Zero Order Phase
30	Megadeth	Anthology: Set the World Afire
30	Misery Index	Traitors
30	Suspyre	When Time Fades...
30	Trivium	Shogun

=== October ===
Day	Artist	Album
6	Bloodbath	The Fathomless Mastery
7	tesla	Forever More
13	Gojira	The Way of All Flesh
14	Haste the Day	Dreamer
14	Unearth	The March
14	Winterfylleth	The Ghost of Heritage
14	Yngwie Malmsteen	Perpetual Flame
17	Zonaria	The Cancer Empire
20	The Amenta	n0n
20	Darkthrone	Dark Thrones and Black Flags
21	Disciple	Southern Hospitality
21	See You Next Tuesday	Intervals
22	Thyrfing	Hels vite
22	AC/DC	Black Ice
23	Lordi	Deadache
24	Darkane	Demonic Art
24	Catamenia	VIII - The Time Unchained
24	Sylosis	Conclusion of an Age
25	Cradle of Filth	Godspeed on the Devil's Thunder
28	Beneath the Massacre	Dystopia
28	Exodus	Let There Be Blood

=== November ===
Day	Artist	Album
3	Satyricon	The Age of Nero
3	Turisas	A Finnish Summer With Turisas
10	The Red Shore	Unconsecrated
11	Attack Attack!	Someday Came Suddenly
11	Behemoth	Ezkaton
11	Dance Club Massacre	Circle of Death
11	Dir En Grey	Uroboros
11	The Faceless	Planetary Duality
11	Light This City	Stormchaser
11	Six Feet Under	Death Rituals
11	Sympathy	Anagogic Tyranny
11	Pig Destroyer	Natasha (EP)
14	Edguy	Tinnitus Sanctus
14	Elvenking	Two Tragedy Poets (...and a Caravan of Weird Figures)
14	Hortus Animae	Funeral Nation / 10 Years Of Hortus Animae
17	Cynic	Traced in Air
18	Mononc' Serge & Anonymus	Musique Barbare
18	Mudvayne	The New Game
24	Arch Enemy	Tyrants of the Rising Sun
25	Becoming the Archetype	Dichotomy

=== December ===
Day	Artist	Album
18	Tankard	Thirst

Preceded by 2007	Heavy Metal Timeline; 2008	Succeeded by 2009
