= Chad Fjerstad =

American musician

Chad Fjerstad is an American musician. He has composed music scores for feature-length films such as Dark Cloud and released synthesizer-based albums under his surname. He is the songwriter and front person of synth-pop band More Ephemerol, and is one of the key songwriters and players in progressive rock trio K'mono and avant punk band Ass Life. He's also toured extensively and internationally as the bassist in bands such as Dead to Fall, VR Sex, Nehemiah, and The Primals

== Early life, family, and education ==
Chad Fjerstad grew up in the Twin Cities (St. Paul/Minneapolis), Minnesota. His music career began as the bassist in Midwest-based metalcore bands Nehemiah, and Dead to Fall.

== Music ==
After Dead to Fall's break-up in 2008, Fjerstad relocated to Los Angeles, California, where he formed industrial metal duo Chiildren, Ass Life, and More Ephemerol, which was initially a solo vehicle and drew inspiration from electronic acts like Front 242, Cabaret Voltaire, the Human League and Orchestral Manoeuvres in the Dark.

In 2014, Fjerstad launched the imprint Ephemerol Night Terrors, through which he would release a great quantity of his projects including music albums and paperback books, as well as releases by other notable artists such as underground icon Geneva Jacuzzi.

In 2018, Fjerstad joined Darkest Hour's frontman John Henry in the side project The Primals.

Though generally functioning as a complementary player to other songwriters in the past, Fjerstad began receiving favorable reviews between 2019 and 2023, for his own compositional works heard through releases by K'mono, More Ephemerol, and under his surname.

== Discography ==
Chad Fjerstad

- Warship - Original Soundtrack (Ephemerol Night Terrors, 2025)
- Dark Cloud - Original Motion Picture Score (Ephemerol Night Terrors, 2022)

Fjerstad

- Promiscuous Sects (Ephemerol Night Terrors, 2024)
- 8-Circuit Neurorgasmic Trigger (Ephemerol Night Terrors, 2019)

More Ephemerol

- Apotheosis Pageant (Ephemerol Night Terrors, 2023)
- Fertile Energy (Oraculo Records, 2023)
- Fractal Bath (Ephemerol Night Terrors, 2015)

K'mono

- Mind Out of Mind (Ephemerol Night Terrors, 2023)
- Return To The 'E' (Ephemerol Night Terrors, 2021)

Ass Life

- Ass Life (Ephemerol Night Terrors, 2023)
- Damn, Dude (self-released, 2017)
- A Couple Cold Ones (Ephemerol Night Terrors/Wiener Records, 2015)

The Primals

- All Love is True Love (Southern Lord Records, 2018)

Chiildren

- The Circle Narrows EP (Records Ad Nauseam, 2015)
- The Other People EP (Bit Riot Records, 2012)

Dead to Fall

- Are You Serious? (Victory Records, 2008)
- The Phoenix Throne (Victory Records, 2006)

Nehemiah

- Lenore EP (Uprising Records, 2005)
- The Asphyxiation Process (Uprising Records, 2003)
- Nehemiah EP (self-released, 2001)
