= The Day the Music Died (disambiguation) =

The Day the Music Died is a line from the 1971 song "American Pie" by Don McLean, referring to a 1959 plane crash in which musicians Buddy Holly, Ritchie Valens, and The Big Bopper died.

The Day the Music Died may also refer to:

- The Day the Music Died (album), an album by Beneath the Sky
- The Day the Music Died (radio programme), a BBC musical/comedy series
- The Day the Music Died, a novel by Joseph C. Smith
