= Enslaved =

Enslaved may refer to:

- Slavery, the socio-economic condition of being owned and worked by and for someone else
- Enslaved (band), a progressive black metal band from Haugesund, Norway
- "Enslaved", a song by Mötley Crüe on their Greatest Hits album
- Enslaved (Soulfly album), 2012
- Enslaved (Steel Attack album), 2004
- Enslaved: Odyssey to the West, a 2010 video game developed by Ninja Theory
- Bottom (BDSM), people playing the 'slave' part in BDSM
- Enslaved (TV series), a British-Canadian TV documentary series
