= Redemption of the Flesh =

EP by Flactorophia
- Released: July 4, 2006
- Genre: Christian metal, goregrind
- Length: 8:58

Flactorophia chronology
Redemption of the Flesh (2006)	6-Way Sin Decomposition (2007)

Redemption of the Flesh is the debut EP by the Ecuadorian goregrind project Flactorophia, released on 4 July 2006. Flactorophia consisted solely of José Barragán. Two years after the EP's release, Barragán was killed in the Factory nightclub fire on 19 April 2008. The recording was re-released ten years later in April 2018, by Bearded Dragon Productions.

== Release history ==
The EP was originally released independently by Flactorophia on 4 July 2006. In April 2018, the Indiana, United States–based label Bearded Dragon Productions posthumously re-released the EP. The re-release includes a separate, hidden bonus instrumental track.

== Style and lyrics ==
The music on Redemption of the Flesh is described as grindcore and, more specifically, goregrind. Reviewer Lloyd Harp labeled the style on the recording as "proper" grindcore, without any obvious death metal, hardcore, deathcore, or noisecore elements. The songs consistently utilize heavily distorted and downtuned guitar, "machine gun" blastbeats from the drum machine, and, excepting the final instrumental track, growling, guttural vocals. The vocals on "In the Heart of God" devolve into squeals. As typical for grindcore, the vocals are completely unintelligible. Andy Shaw of Cross Rhythms considered the vocal style "otherworldly". Attilio Rizzoli of Whitemetal.it remarked that Barragán's "classically gore grunt" made them a "little peckish" for "cannibalistic banquets of insipid origin." John Jackson of The Metal Resource described the vocals as sounding "as if someone is actively tearing out Jose Barragan's throat" but noted that their underlying melody can sometimes be discerned. The production was handled by Barragán himself and is simple and raw. Jackson called the style on the release "raw, demo-quality grindcore". Harp similarly described the production as raw and lo-fi. The songs are brief, and some of them incorporate samples.

== Critical reception ==
Professional ratings
Review scores
Source	Rating
Cross Rhythms	6/10 stars
The Metal Resource	6/10
White Metal	80/100

Andy Shaw of Cross Rhythms rated the EP six out of ten. He remarked that with eight tracks packed into nine minutes of run-time, the record "is like an audio ambush, hitting you with ferocity and intensity and then it's over before you have time to work out what is going on." He felt if the production was punchier, it would have emphasized the music's intensity, but conceded it is hard to criticize the production quality of a low-budget one-man project from 2008. He praised Barragán for his passion for Christianity throughout the recording, "creating positive music bringing light to a genre that is so often bleak and dark." Shaw considered the decennial re-release "a fitting tribute to be putting it out to commemorate his contribution to the Christian grindcore scene."

Lloyd Harp, writing for Indie Vision Music, felt that the production on the re-release was spot on, balancing lo-fi aesthetic with listenability and allowance, though he added the caveat that, not having access to the original 2006 issue, he could not compare the two versions. Harp highly recommended the EP. Conversely, John Jackson from The Metal Resource considered the production poor, obscuring the interesting aspects of the music. He rated the album six out of ten. Attilio Rizzoli from WhiteMetal.it rated the album eighty out of one hundred; they noted in particular the drum machine programming as exceptional.

== Track listing ==
2006 original release edition
No.	Title	Length
1.	"Regurgitation Demons Outside the Human Flesh"	1:46
2.	"In the Heart of God"	1:02
3.	"Where Is Your Daughter"	1:20
4.	"One Question & One Answer" (Vomitorial Corpulence cover)	0:05
5.	"Provider of Love"	1:05
6.	"The Sin Eater"	0:44
7.	"Scream in the Darkness"	1:19
Total length:		7:21

2018 re-release edition
No.	Title	Length
8.	Untitled (Hidden instrumental track)	1:37
Total length:		8:58

== Personnel ==
- José Barragán – All instruments
