= Are You Serious =

Are You Serious may refer to:

== Music ==
=== Albums ===
- Are You Serious? (Richard Pryor album), 1976
- Are You Serious? (Dead to Fall album), 2008
- Are You Serious (Andrew Bird album), 2016

=== Songs ===
- "Are You Serious", a 1982 song by Tyrone Davis, composed by Leo Graham
- "Are You Serious", a 1985 song by 'Til Tuesday; the B-side of "Voices Carry"
- "Are You Serious", a song by Andrew Bird from the 2016 album Are You Serious
- "Are You Serious", a song by Filthy Frank from the 2017 album Pink Season
- "Are You Serious?", a 2022 song by K.Flay from Inside Voices / Outside Voices, 2022
