= 6-Way Sin Decomposition =

2007 Christian goregrind compilation album

Compilation album (Split album) by Flactorophia, Demonic Dismemberment, Eternal Mystery, Vomitous Discharge, Engravor, Vomitorial Corpulence
- Released: August 23, 2007
- Recorded: 2006–2007
- Genres: Christian metal; grindcore; goregrind; noisecore
- Length: 1:10:32
- Languages: English; Spanish
- Labels: Christ Core; Vomit Bucket
- Compilers: Eternal Mystery; Demonic Dismemberment; José Barragán; Gag; Chris Valentine

Flactorophia chronology
Redemption of the Flesh (2006)	6-Way Sin Decomposition (2007)	Whorevisceration (2008)

Demonic Dismemberment chronology
6-Way Sin Decomposition (2007)	Human Depravity (2008)

Eternal Mystery chronology
2-Way Perversion Holocaust (2007)	6-Way Sin Decomposition (2007)	4-Way Noise Explosion (2008)

Vomitous Discharge chronology
Festering Carcass Covered in Rot (2007)	6-Way Sin Decomposition (2007)	Insomnia Isterica / Vomitous Discharge (2008)

Engravor chronology
Manifestation (2007)	6-Way Sin Decomposition (2007)

Vomitorial Corpulence chronology
Karrionic Hacktician (2006)	6-Way Sin Decomposition (2007)

6-Way Sin Decomposition is a split album between six Christian goregrind artists, released on August 23, 2007, jointly by Christ Core Records and Vomit Bucket Productions. The album contains tracks from the Ecuadorian band Flactorophia, the American bands Demonic Dismemberment and Eternal Mystery, the German band Vomitous Discharge, and the Australian bands Engravor and Vomitorial Corpulence.

== Recording and release ==
Gag, the sole individual behind Vomitous Discharge, stated in a 2015 interview that initially the recording was planned as a four-way split between his band and Flactorophia, Demonic Dismemberment, and Eternal Mystery after those three projects invited him to join a split recording with them. Gag created the title and an initial draft for the cover art, but work on the release stalled as the artists looked for someone to release it. At about that time Chris Valentine of Vomitorial Corpulence contacted the four artists about joining the release with newly recorded material from the band from a planned album that had fallen through. Valentine then helped with the planning of the album, suggested bringing in Engravor, and financed most of the CD pressing. Gag of Vomitous Discharge and José Barragán of Flactorophia covered the remaining pressing costs. The final product was released jointly on Christ Core Records and Gag's Vomit Bucket Productions. The final release contained 83 songs, (Note: Heaven's Metal mentions 82 songs in its review, and 82 songs are listed in the album liner notes. However, the Vomit Bucket Production and Vomitorial Corpulence website both mention 83 songs; Gag from Vomit Bucket Productions and Vomitous Discharge has explained the existence of a track hidden before the 82 songs listed in the liner notes.) ranging in length from only 4 seconds (from Vomitous Discharge) to 3:26 (from Flactorophia).

== Musical style ==
Lloyd Harp of Heaven's Metal noted that while the majority of the recording is in the goregrind style, there still is more variety than expected for an exclusively grindcore compilation. Jamie Lee Rake of The Phantom Tollbooth likewise felt that the half a dozen goregrind acts provide more variety than might be expected for a musical style on the outermost fringe of extremity.

Harp, writing in 2025 for Indie Vision Music, described the style of Demonic Dismemberment as heavily influenced by experimental noise, performing a subgenre of grind known as "noisecore". Rake found Eternal Mystery's vocals to be the deepest in pitch on the recording, likening them to an incomprehensible Darth Vader. Demonic Dismemberment's vocals Rake thought sound the least human, more comparable to a malfunctioning vacuum cleaner. Engravor use percussive sounds and little else, the after-effects of the noise functioning similar to bass. Vomitorial Corpulence, the only band with more than one member, perform heavy guitar tones, a range of percussion, and vocals ranging from screeched gargles to mumbles to death growls.

== Reception ==
Professional ratings
Review scores
Source	Rating
The Phantom Tollbooth	3.5/5 stars

The compilation was noted for the contributions from Vomitorial Corpulence, who were veterans in the Christian grindcore scene and, of the artists on the compilation, the closest to being a classic Christian metal act. Lloyd Harp considered the release a great introduction to the Christian grindcore scene, although he warned that the lyrics and music "are not for the faint of heart." In a 2025 article on Christian grindcore, Jason McLaren of Heaven's Metal opined that the recording is "ridiculously extreme" and would only be enjoyed by "those who like the most grotesque noise possible".

Jamie Lee Rake questioned the utility of the incomprehensible vocals as a means to evangelize but felt that the music could work as a means of fun cacophonous exaltation of God. Flactorophia they felt stood out not only for being from Ecuador, writing some songs in Spanish, and for the vocals, but also for the "most berserk drum machine of the lot." Demonic Dismemberment they said deserve praise for its boldness in placing "Excremental Human Offal" right before "He Died For You And Me", as well as likely the only usage of "spewagly" in a gospel song title that the reader would hear that decade. Rake praised Eternal Mystery's guitar work and the theological intelligence of the band's lyrics. Regarding Vomitous Discharge, Rake expressed some skepticism given that the band had appeared on some pornogrind compilations but respected that band's use of found sounds and sampling. They gave the album an overall score of three-and-a-half out of five.

== Tracklisting ==
No.	Title	Artist	Length
0.	"Sin Decomposition"	Flactorophia, Demonic Dismemberment, Eternal Mystery, Vomitous Discharge, Engravor, Vomitorial Corpulence	3:02
1.	"Desmembrado en el Mausoleo"	Flactorophia	1:49
2.	"Disfigured"	Flactorophia	1:00
3.	"Alive"	Flactorophia	0:05
4.	"In the Heart of God"	Flactorophia	1:01
5.	"Patética Frustración Escondida en la Inseguridad del Conocimiento"	Flactorophia	1:46
6.	"Catastrophic Death"	Flactorophia	0:46
7.	"El Calvario de la Salvación"	Flactorophia	0:48
8.	"Exhumation of the Mutilated Corpse"	Flactorophia	0:12
9.	"Where is Your Daughter?"	Flactorophia	1:19
10.	"Eternal Anguish"	Flactorophia	3:26
11.	"Disembowelment Satanicide"	Demonic Dismemberment	0:20
12.	"Slow Down and Puke Out Your Bowels for the Master"	Demonic Dismemberment	0:45
13.	"Gluttonic Spewage"	Demonic Dismemberment	0:27
14.	"Blended Into Putrid Flesh Bile"	Demonic Dismemberment	0:52
15.	"Divine Tribulation"	Demonic Dismemberment	0:49
16.	"Exhumed Visceral Abominated Rot"	Demonic Dismemberment	1:30
17.	"Horrific Mass Sin Mutilation"	Demonic Dismemberment	0:16
18.	"Live Gore"	Demonic Dismemberment	1:01
19.	"Acto Plasmic Entities of the Flesh and Horrific Entrails"	Demonic Dismemberment	0:44
20.	"Dismemberment"	Demonic Dismemberment	0:40
21.	"Spewagly Engrossed Tumour of Sin"	Demonic Dismemberment	0:57
22.	"Maggot Infested Carcassile"	Demonic Dismemberment	0:52
23.	"Tear Down False Gods"	Demonic Dismemberment	1:04
24.	"Excremental Human Offal"	Demonic Dismemberment	1:05
25.	"He Died for You and Me"	Demonic Dismemberment	1:08
26.	"Intro - From Peace to Destruction"	Eternal Mystery	0:23
27.	"Blind to Reality"	Eternal Mystery	1:07
28.	"Death to the Flesh"	Eternal Mystery	0:16
29.	"Blinded by Hatred"	Eternal Mystery	0:49
30.	"The Time is Now"	Eternal Mystery	0:05
31.	"The Choice"	Eternal Mystery	1:12
32.	"The Choice Pt. 2 (The Right Choice)"	Eternal Mystery	0:06
33.	"The Choice Pt. 3 (The Wrong Choice)"	Eternal Mystery	0:46
34.	"Cry for Liberty"	Eternal Mystery	0:44
35.	"Severed"	Eternal Mystery	0:18
36.	"Left Behind"	Eternal Mystery	1:29
37.	"Decomposition"	Eternal Mystery	0:15
38.	"Human Sacrifice"	Eternal Mystery	0:16
39.	"Death's Face"	Eternal Mystery	1:47
40.	"Burnt to a Crisp"	Eternal Mystery	0:47
41.	"Spiritual Decay"	Eternal Mystery	1:34
42.	"Diagnosis - Sepsia of Sin"	Vomitous Discharge	3:17
43.	"Therapy - Jesus Injection"	Vomitous Discharge	0:53
44.	"Holocaustic Dismemberment of Perversion"	Vomitous Discharge	1:27
45.	"Snorting Out the Nasal Mucous"	Vomitous Discharge	0:08
46.	"Homo Dementus"	Vomitous Discharge	0:39
47.	"Insalubrious Pus Discharged from the Oral Cavity"	Vomitous Discharge	0:31
48.	"Regurgitate the Rotting Flesh"	Vomitous Discharge	2:07
49.	"Torturous Death of Pornography"	Vomitous Discharge	0:19
50.	"Carrionic Mutilated Demon-Waste"	Vomitous Discharge	0:15
51.	"Gore to the World" (cover of Joy to the World)	Vomitous Discharge	1:05
52.	"Maggot's Feast on Lusty Carcass"	Vomitous Discharge	0:05
53.	"Sacrificial Splatterfeast at Golgatha Leading to Salvation"	Vomitous Discharge	1:01
54.	"The Vomitous Discharge Pt. II"	Vomitous Discharge	0:04
55.	"VomitGore ChristCore"	Vomitous Discharge	2:33
56.	"Lured"	Engravor	0:16
57.	"Devestation"	Engravor	0:26
58.	"Ruin"	Engravor	0:15
59.	"Memory"	Engravor	0:15
60.	"Lifeless Corpse"	Engravor	0:09
61.	"Your Face"	Engravor	0:18
62.	"Betrayed"	Engravor	0:11
63.	"Mockery"	Engravor	0:13
64.	"Reason"	Engravor	0:15
65.	"Calamity"	Engravor	0:14
66.	"Earth"	Engravor	0:20
67.	"Depend"	Engravor	0:14
68.	"Useless"	Engravor	0:28
69.	"Bed of Maggots"	Vomitorial Corpulence	0:12
70.	"Why?"	Vomitorial Corpulence	0:56
71.	"Christian Does Not Equal Stupid"	Vomitorial Corpulence	0:38
72.	"Spiritual Savagery"	Vomitorial Corpulence	0:35
73.	"End of the Age"	Vomitorial Corpulence	0:44
74.	"The Clone Machine"	Vomitorial Corpulence	1:27
75.	"Dead Faith"	Vomitorial Corpulence	1:07
76.	"God of Your Own Making"	Vomitorial Corpulence	0:43
77.	"Religion of the Heart"	Vomitorial Corpulence	0:49
78.	"Gospel Death Squad"	Vomitorial Corpulence	0:42
79.	"Burn Forever"	Vomitorial Corpulence	0:59
80.	"Perpetual Inner Conflict"	Vomitorial Corpulence	1:16
81.	"Dissolution of Divine Injustice"	Vomitorial Corpulence	1:19
82.	"Plastic Saviour"	Vomitorial Corpulence	1:49
Total length:			1:10:32

== Personnel ==
- José Barragán – All instruments and vocals (tracks 1 to 10); vocals (track 0)
- Hayden Edwards – Music and performance (tracks 11 to 25); vocals (track 0)
- Broc Toney – Vocals, guitar, drum programming (tracks 26 to 41); guitar (track 0)
- Brandon – Bass (tracks 26 to 41)
- Gag – Vocals (tracks 0; 42 to 55), guitar, drums, recording, and mixing (tracks 42 to 55)
- Alspal – Music and performance (tracks: 56 to 68); vocals (track 0)
- Mark Hamilton – Bass, vocals (tracks 69 to 82)
- Chris Valentine – Drums (tracks 0; 69 to 82), vocals (tracks 69 to 82); bass (track 0)
- Paul Green – Guitar (tracks 69 to 82)
