= In Loving Memory =

In Loving Memory may refer to:

- In Loving Memory (TV series), a 1979–1986 British period sitcom
- In Loving Memory (Beneath the Sky album) or the title song, 2010
- In Loving Memory (compilation album), a gospel compilation, 1968
- In Loving Memory (Sean Leon album), 2023
- In Loving Memory (Blackbear album), 2022
- "In Loving Memory", a song by Alter Bridge from One Day Remains, 2004
- "In Loving Memory", a song by Bullet for My Valentine from Venom, 2015

== See also ==
- In Loving Memory Of..., an album by Big Wreck, 1997
