= At Daggers Drawn =

At Daggers Drawn may refer to:

- At Daggers Drawn (album), debut album by metalcore band Sea of Treachery
- At Daggers Drawn (novel), fifth novel by Russian author Nikolai Leskov
