= Carriers of Dust =

Studio album by Mirrorthrone
- Released: 2006
- Recorded: 2005
- Genre: Extreme metal symphonic metal Avant-garde metal
- Length: 46:03
- Label: Red Stream Inc.
- Producer: Vladimir Cochet

Mirrorthrone chronology
Of Wind and Weeping (2003)	Carriers of Dust (2006)	Gangrene (2008)

Carriers of Dust is the second studio album by the one man symphonic black metal band Mirrorthrone.

== Track listing ==
1. "A Scream to Express the Hate of a Race" – 9:22
2. "Mortphose" – 4:49
3. "De l'Échec Et De Son Essentialité [Point 1. Marginalité Démystifiée]" – 10:22
4. "Ils Brandiront leurs Idoles" – 22:10

== Credits ==
- Vladimir Cochet - Vocals, Guitars, Bass, Synthesizer & drum programming.
