= Ares (Salt the Wound album) =

Studio album by Salt the Wound
- Released: September 15, 2009
- Recorded: 2009 in Lakewood, Ohio at Conquistador Studios
- Genre: Deathcore
- Length: 40:49
- Label: Rotten
- Producer: Cole Martinez

Salt the Wound chronology
Carnal Repercussions (2008)	Ares (2009)	Kill the Crown (2011)

Ares is the second album by American deathcore band Salt the Wound. It was released on September 15, 2009, through Rotten Records.

== Promotion and background ==
Promoting the release of the album, the band performed at a show in Cleveland at the Grog Shop on August 29, 2009, releasing copies of the album during the show, two weeks before the scheduled release. The song "Take a Bow" is the longest Salt the Wound song ever recorded. The band broke up months after the record's release and reformed nearly a year later with original members following Ares with the release of their third album Kill the Crown.

== Track listing ==
No.	Title	Length
1.	"Mutations"	2:31
2.	"From My Hands"	4:01
3.	"Foot of the Thrown"	3:22
4.	"An Era of Revolution"	3:23
5.	"When People are Shameless"	3:47
6.	"Jafar"	3:13
7.	"Hail the Locusts"	3:55
8.	"Take a Bow"	16:35
Total length:		40:49

== Personnel ==
Salt the Wound

- Matt Wesoly – vocals
- Jake Scott – guitar
- Vince Stropki – guitar
- Brian Martinez – bass guitar
- Robert Walters – drums

Production

- Cole Martinez – producer, engineer
