= Spirit Bound Flesh =

Studio album by Scott Kelly
- Released: Aug 7, 2001
- Recorded: Jun 2000 – Feb 2001
- Genre: Country/Folk
- Label: Neurot Recordings
- Producer: Scott Kelly

Scott Kelly chronology
Spirit Bound Flesh (2001)	The Wake (2008)

Professional ratings
Review scores
Source	Rating
AllMusic	3/5 stars

Spirit Bound Flesh is the first solo CD by Scott Kelly from Neurosis, consisting mostly of acoustic country/folk music influenced by Johnny Cash. This was the last album Scott performed on before going sober.

== Track listing ==
1. "I Don't Feel You Anymore" – 3:44
2. "The Passage" – 4:11
3. "In Her Room" – 3:05
4. "Return to All" – 4:51
5. "Sacred Heart" – 4:16
6. "Flower" – 3:23
7. "Through My Existence" – 6:37
8. "The Honor of My Prisoner" – 4:55
