= Diabolic Symphony =

Studio album by Steel Attack
- Released: April 21, 2006
- Recorded: Black Lounge Studios, Sweden
- Genre: Power metal
- Length: 52:02
- Label: Massacre Records in Europe; Locomotive Records in USA
- Producer: Jonas Kjellgren; Steel Attack

Steel Attack chronology
| Enslaved (2004) | Diabolic Symphony (2006) | Carpe DiEnd (2008) |

Diabolic Symphony is the fifth album by the Swedish power metal band Steel Attack.

== Track listing ==
All lyrics are written by Ronny Hemlin; all music is composed by Steel Attack.

| No. | Title | Length |
|---|---|---|
| 1. | "Diabolic Symphony" | 4:18 |
| 2. | "Dead Forever" | 4:58 |
| 3. | "Shallow Seas of Hatred" | 3:55 |
| 4. | "Dreaming" | 4:47 |
| 5. | "Embraced by Fear" | 4:34 |
| 6. | "Invisible God" | 4:43 |
| 7. | "Sanctimonious" | 4:01 |
| 8. | "Haunting" | 3:58 |
| 9. | "Show Me the Way" | 3:57 |
| 10. | "Winter Hell" | 3:55 |
| 11. | "I Bow My Head in Shame" | 5:10 |
| 12. | "The Other Side" | 3:46 |

== Personnel ==
- Ronny Hemlin – vocals
- John Allan – guitar
- Johan Jalonen – guitar
- Anden Andersson – bass
- Tony Elfving – drums
