= What Demons Do to Saints =

Studio album by Beneath the Sky
- Released: January 23, 2007
- Recorded: Boston, Massachusetts
- Genre: Metalcore, deathcore
- Length: 45:57
- Label: Victory Records
- Producer: Jason Suecof

Beneath the Sky chronology
More Than You Can Handle... (2006)	What Demons Do to Saints (2007)	The Day the Music Died (2008)

Professional ratings
Review scores
Source	Rating
About.com	3.5/5 stars
Decoymusic	1.5/5 stars
Geekburger	3/10 stars
Hardcore Sounds	3/5 stars
Loudside	8/11
Metal Rage	75/100
Not Popular	1/5 stars
Planet Loud	7/10 stars
Punknews.org	1.5/4 stars

What Demons Do to Saints is the debut album of metalcore band Beneath the Sky. It was released on January 23, 2007.

== Track list ==
1. "Goodfellas" – 3:56
2. "For Each Remembered Name" – 4:18
3. "A Grave Mistake" – 3:41
4. "Last Call" – 2:15
5. "7861" – 4:51
6. "How the Times Have Changed" – 4:36
7. "Our Last Road" – 3:25
8. "The Reason" – 3:51
9. "Being in a Coma Is Hell Carried On" – 5:13
10. "Falling in Love with Cold Hands" – 4:56
11. "The Glamour of Corruption" – 4:52

== Personnel ==
Beneath the Sky

- Joey Nelson – unclean vocals
- Jeff Nelson – guitar
- Chris Profitt – guitar
- Nick Scarberry – bass, clean vocals
- Brandon Sowder – drums
- Matt Jones – keytar

== Album Notes ==
- "7861", "Our Last Road", and "Being in a Coma Is Hell Carried On" are slower-paced renditions of the tracks that appeared on More Than You Can Handle....
- "Falling in Love with Cold Hands" was rewritten, and shortened compared to the old demo version recorded in 2005.
- "How the Times Have Changed" is sometimes erroneously referred to as "No Such Thing as Control".
- A music video was shot for "7861".
