= Everything I Touch Falls to Pieces =

Studio album by Dead to Fall
- Released: September 10, 2002
- Genre: Metalcore
- Length: 38:21
- Label: Victory

Dead to Fall chronology
Everything I Touch Falls to Pieces (2002)	Villainy & Virtue (2004)

Everything I Touch Falls to Pieces is the debut full-length album from influential Chicago-based metalcore band Dead to Fall. The band shows a style in the vein of Swedish-influenced melodic death metal. The album's general theme deals with personal struggle and conflict with a loved one, often due to betrayal. The album is said to resemble the music of "At The Gates, The Haunted, with a touch of Killswitch Engage and Shadows Fall being added to the mix".

== Track listing ==
No.	Title	Length
1.	"Prologue"	1:12
2.	"Memory"	3:44
3.	"Eternal Gates of Hell"	3:16
4.	"Like A Bullet"	3:33
5.	"Graven Image"	3:58
6.	"Words Ignored"	2:52
7.	"Cost Of A Good Impression"	3:08
8.	"Tu Se Morta"	3:45
9.	"Doraematu"	2:54
10.	"Preying On The Helpless"	4:45
11.	"The Balance Theory"	5:04
Total length:		38:21

== Members ==
- Jonathan Hunt - vocals
- Bryan Lear - lead guitar
- Seth Nichols - rhythm guitar
- Justin Jakimiak - bass
- Dan Craig - drums

== Reception ==
- Allmusic
- Punknews.org

== Miscellanea ==
- The song Tu Se Morta is a translated cover of a song from L'Orpheo by Claudio Monteverdi.
- The song Eternal Gates of Hell is actually about a moment the band had at a toll booth where the attendant actually said "...and then I saw the blood coming." The "Carnage" and "Demise" parts were added because they thought it sounded cool.
- Parts of the song Doraematu are an altered form of the Anonymous Spanish classical guitar work Romanza
