= Golgotha (With Blood Comes Cleansing album) =

Studio album by With Blood Comes Cleansing
- Released: August 22, 2006
- Recorded: 2006
- Genre: Deathcore
- Length: 25:05
- Label: Blood and Ink

With Blood Comes Cleansing chronology
The Dern EP (2005)	Golgotha (2006)	Horror (2008)

Professional ratings
Review scores
Source	Rating
About.com	3.5/5 stars
Indievisionmusic.com	9/10 stars

Golgotha is the debut studio album by American deathcore band With Blood Comes Cleansing. It was released in 2006 on Blood and Ink Records. Vocalist Michael Sasser left shortly after the recording of this album, and original vocalist Dean Atkinson returned.

== Track listing ==
1. "An Introduction to Death" — 0:39
2. "Golgotha" — 2:31
3. "Mark Your Words" — 2:39
4. "Fearless Before Opposition" — 2:52
5. "Take Everything" — 3:40
6. "My Help" — 2:30
7. "Persecution" — 2:58
8. "Bring Out Your Dead" — 2:35
9. "Betrayed" — 2:25
10. "Hypocrisy" — 2:16

== Personnel ==
- Michael Sasser - vocals
- Scott Erickson - guitar
- Jeremy Sims - guitar
- Greg Titus - bass
- Spence Erickson - drums
