= Villainy & Virtue =

Studio album by Dead to Fall
- Released: September 14, 2004
- Recorded: April 19 - May 7, 2004
- Genre: Metalcore
- Length: 31:18
- Label: Victory

Dead to Fall chronology
Everything I Touch Falls To Pieces (2002)	Villainy & Virtue (2004)	The Phoenix Throne (2006)

Villainy & Virtue is the second full-length album released by Chicago, Illinois-based metalcore band Dead to Fall.

== Track listing ==
No.	Title	Length
1.	"Torn Self"	2:31
2.	"Bastard Set Of Dreams"	4:21
3.	"Stand Your Ground"	2:16
4.	"You’ve Already Died"	3:26
5.	"Villainy and Virtue"	3:04
6.	"Little Birds"	1:22
7.	"Blood Of The Moon"	5:30
8.	"Cross Section"	2:01
9.	"Master Exploder"	3:02
10.	"Epilogue"	3:45
Total length:		31:18

== Members ==
- Jonathan Hunt - Vocals
- Matthew Matera - Rhythm Guitar
- Logan Kelly - Lead Guitar
- Justin Jakimiak - Bass guitar
- Evan Kaplan - Drums

== Reception ==
- Punknews.org link
- Lambgoat link|

== Miscellanea ==
- This album marked the introduction of Paul A. Romano as the band's artwork designer.
