= Where Mankind Fails =

Studio album by Steel Attack
- Released: June 21, 1999
- Recorded: Studio Underground, Sweden; September/October 1998
- Genre: Power metal
- Length: 50:37
- Label: AFM Records
- Producer: P.O.Saether and Steel Attack

Steel Attack chronology
Where Mankind Fails (1999)	Fall Into Madness (2001)

Professional ratings
Review scores
Source	Rating
Rock Hard	5.5/10

Where Mankind Fails is the debut studio album by Swedish power metal band Steel Attack. It was released on June 21, 1999.

== Track listing ==
All tracks are written by Steel Attack.

No.	Title	Length
1.	"Dragon's Skull"	5:47
2.	"Where Mankind Fails"	4:11
3.	"Island of Gods"	5:41
4.	"Heading For the Lair"	4:47
5.	"Village of Agabha"	4:31
6.	"The Furious Spirit of Death"	3:21
7.	"The Creation of Be-Lou (The Tragic Kingdom Part I)"	8:01
8.	"The Awakening (The Tragic Kingdom Part II)"	5:24
9.	"Thunder Knight"	5:10
10.	"Forgotten Land"	4:45
11.	"Holy Sea of Gold" (Japan bonus track)

== Personnel ==
- John Allan – guitar
- Andreas de Vera – drums
- Steve Steel – vocals, bass
- Dennis Vestman – guitars
- Daniel Nummelin – keyboards (guest)
- Peter Kronberg – choir vocals
- Adrian Maleska - cover art
