= Sombre Romantic =

Studio album by Virgin Black
- Released: 14 October 2000
- Recorded: 2000
- Genre: Doom metal, classical music, opera, gothic metal, industrial metal
- Length: 44:38
- Label: Crestfallen Records

Virgin Black chronology
Trance (EP) (1998)	Sombre Romantic (2000)	Elegant... and Dying (2003)

Professional ratings
Review scores
Source	Rating
Allmusic	link
Lords of Metal	70/100 link
Metal Storm	9.2/10 link
Metal.de	link (in German)
Powermetal.de	link (in German)

Sombre Romantic is the debut studio album from Australian gothic metal band Virgin Black. The album was originally released on 14 October 2000 in a very limited pressing within Australia only by Crestfallen Records. It was then re-released on 12 February 2001 on The End Records in the United States and in Europe by German label Massacre Records. A 2002 re-pressing of this album by The End also included the Trance EP as a bonus disk. In 2021, Virgin Black signed the first official worldwide streaming release of Sombre Romantic with the Australian distributor Dark Escapes Music.

== Track listing ==
1. "Opera de Romanci I. - Stare" - 3:57
2. "Opera de Romanci II. - Embrace" - 3:52
3. "Walk Without Limbs" - 4:26
4. "Of Your Beauty" - 4:00
5. "Drink the Midnight Hymn" - 5:14
6. "Museum of Iscariot" - 7:41
7. "Lamenting Kiss" - 5:25
8. "Weep for Me" - 1:52
9. "I Sleep with the Emperor" - 2:40
10. "A Poet's Tears of Porcelain" - 5:20
11. "Outro" - 0:11 *

* hidden track

== Credits ==
- Samantha Escarbe - lead guitar
- Rowan London - lead vocals, keyboards, piano
- Craig Edis - vocals, guitar
- Dino Cielo - drums
- Ian Miller - bass, vocals
- Aaron Nicholls - bass
- Chris Handley (guest) - cello
