= Fall Into Madness =

Studio album by Steel Attack
- Released: June 16, 2001
- Genre: Power metal
- Length: 45:36
- Label: AFM Records
- Producer: Steel Attack and Pelle Saether

Steel Attack chronology
Where Mankind Fails (1999)	Fall Into Madness (2001)	Predator of the Empire (2003)

Fall Into Madness is Steel Attack's second album, released in June 2001. It was recorded in Studio Underground in May 2000.

Rock Hard printed two reviews, one giving 8 out of 10 points but the other only 5.

In the Norwegian press, Fall Into Madness received a dice throw of 5 from Østlendingen, praising the "real goods" presented by "boys who know how music should be played". Jærbladet was more reserved, calling Steel Attack "a band in the myriad of 80s clone groups".

== Track listing ==
All tracks are written by Steel Attack.

No.	Title	Length
1.	"Fall Into Madness"	4:22
2.	"The Beast"	4:59
3.	"Guardians"	4:13
4.	"Holy Swordsmen"	5:28
5.	"Judgement Day"	5:50
6.	"Wings of Faith"	6:15
7.	"Clearing the Mind"	4:34
8.	"Fireballs"	4:31
9.	"Defender of the Crown"	5:24

== Personnel ==
- Steve Steel – vocals, bass
- Dennis Vestman – guitar
- John Allan – guitar
- Roger Raw – drums
- guest: Petri Kuusisto – keyboards

== Production ==
- Produced by Steel Attack and Pelle Saether
- Recorded in Studio Underground by Pelle Saether
- Mixed in Studio Underground by Pelle Saether
- Mastered in Cutting Room by Peter In de Betou
- Artwork by JP Fournier
