= Predator of the Empire =

Predator Of The Empire

Studio album by Steel Attack
- Released: April 15, 2003
- Genre: Power metal
- Length: 49:43
- Label: Arise Records

Steel Attack chronology
Fall Into Madness (2001)	Predator Of The Empire (2003)	Enslaved (2004)

Predator of the Empire is Steel Attack's third album, released in 2003 via Arise Records.

The album was rated a 6.5 out of 10 by Rock Hard, and four out of six by Scream Magazine.

== Track listing ==
All lyrics are written by Steel Attack and Ronny Bengtsson; all music is composed by Steel Attack.

No.	Title	Length
1.	"Predator Of The Empire"	5:18
2.	"Cursed Land"	5:05
3.	"The Darkness"	4:18
4.	"Point Of No Return"	4:54
5.	"Heavy Metal God"	4:27
6.	"The Holy Sign"	4:24
7.	"Arise"	4:51
8.	"Nightmare"	5:20
9.	"One Way To Heaven One Way To Hell"	5:21
10.	"Reality Unknown"	5:45

Bonus Tracks
No.	Title	Length
11.	"Paradise"	5:19
12.	"Dr. Stein" (Helloween cover)	5:20

== Personnel ==
- Dick Johnson – vocals
- John Allan – guitar
- Dennis Vestman – guitar
- Peter Späth – bass
- Mike Stark – drums
