= This World They'll Drown =

Exit Ten

EP by Exit Ten
- Released: 2006
- Recorded: Backstage Studios
- Genre: Post-hardcore; Progressive metal
- Length: 23:30
- Label: Deep Burn Records(UK)
- Producer: Andy Sneap

Exit Ten chronology
Exit Ten (2004)	Exit Ten (2006)	Remember the Day (2008)

Professional ratings
Review scores
Source	Rating
Rock Sound	8/10 link
Metal Hammer	9/10 link
Power Play Magazine	8/10 link

This World They'll Drown is a mini-album by Exit Ten, released in 2006.

The Skinny rated it one star, noting "On top of the metal packaging comes torturous vocals that occasionally growl but descend into nonsensical emo whining, thus making This World... not only completely unlistenable but also completely non cred considering the hardball ballpark. Avoid!"

== Track listing ==
1. "Softwatch" - 4:46
2. "Fine Night" - 4:18
3. "Resume Ignore" - 4:46
4. "A Path To Take" - 4:36
5. "My Great Rebellion" - 5:04

== Credits ==
- Ryan Redman - Vocals
- Stuart Steele - Guitar
- Joe Ward - Guitar
- James Steele - Bass
- Chris Steele - Drums
- Andy Sneap - Production
