= Requiem – Mezzo Forte =

Requiem - Mezzo Forte

Studio album by Virgin Black
- Released: April 3, 2007
- Genre: Christian metal, classical, opera, doom metal, symphonic gothic metal
- Length: 52:08
- Label: US:The End Records; EU:Massacre Records
- Producer: Rowan London, Samantha Escarbe

Virgin Black chronology
Elegant... and Dying (2003)	Requiem - Mezzo Forte (2007)	Requiem – Fortissimo (2007)

Professional ratings
Review scores
Source	Rating
AllMusic	4/5 stars
Cross Rhythms	10/10 stars
Lords of Metal	94/100
Metal.de	(no rating)
Metal Hammer	9/10 stars
Metallus.it	6/10
PopMatters	(no rating)
Powermetal.de	(no rating)

Requiem – Mezzo Forte is the centerpiece of Virgin Black's Requiem trilogy. The album was released on April 3, 2007 in North America on The End Records and April 13, 2007 in Europe on Massacre Records. The Massacre release includes a special 2-disc version.

The album builds on the styles Virgin Black used in their previous albums, with the band and the Adelaide Symphony Orchestra complimenting one another's sound and given roughly equal prominence.

== Track listing ==
1. "Requiem, Kyrie" – 7:42
2. "In Death" – 8:00
3. "Midnight's Hymn" – 4:57
4. "...And I Am Suffering" – 10:55
5. "Domine" – 8:06
6. "Lacrimosa (I Am Blind with Weeping)" – 9:59
7. "Rest Eternal" – 2:29

Bonus retrospective CD + video (on Massacre special edition only)

1. "Mother of Cripples" (Virgin Black demo)
2. "Whispers of Dead Sisters" (Trance)
3. "Museum of Iscariot" (Sombre Romantic)
4. "Our Wings Are Burning" (Elegant... and Dying)
5. "Our Wings Are Burning" (video clip)

== Personnel ==
- Rowan London – keyboard, tenor
- Samantha Escarbe – cello, guitar
- Grayh – bass
- Luk Faz – drums
