= Counting Hallways to the Left =

Studio album by Embrace the End
- Released: June 28, 2005
- Genre: Metalcore, mathcore, deathcore
- Length: 38:30
- Label: Abacus, Man Alive Records
- Producer: Zach Ohren

Embrace the End chronology
| It All Begins With One Broken Dream (2001) | Counting Hallways to the Left (2005) | Ley Lines (2008) |

Professional ratings
Review scores
| Source | Rating |
|---|---|
| AllMusic | |

Counting Hallways To The Left is Embrace the End's first full-length album. It was released on June 28, 2005 on the independent label Abacus Recordings. It was also released on colored vinyl by Man Alive.

== Track listing ==
All tracks by Embrace the End

1. "It Ate Everybody" – 0:27
2. "Biography of a Fever" – 5:46
3. "Carbombs and Conversations" – 4:21
4. "Headlines and Deathtolls" – 1:37
5. "Memento Mori" – 5:50
6. "The Devil Rides a Pale Horse" – 0:55
7. "Frankie is a Cutter" (featuring guest vocals by vocalist Leo Miller and drummer Navene Koperweis of Animosity) – 1:55
8. "Tempest, Tried, and Tortured (The Bloodening)" – 6:52
9. "After Me The Floods" – 5:13
10. "The Father's Right Hand (My Lai)" – 5:34

== Credits ==
- Jesse Alford – vocals
- Pat Piccolo – vocals
- Joel Adams – guitar
- Kyle Dixon – guitar
- Ryan Lewis – bass
- Bart Mullis – drums

== Trivia ==
- The song "After Me The Floods" was originally released on Embrace The End's demo tape as "Apres Moi le Deluge" which is the same title in French.
- The song "Frankie is a Cutter" features guest vocals from Leo Miller and Navene Koperweis, the singer and drummer of Animosity.
