= Elegant... and Dying =

Studio album by Virgin Black
- Released: June 2003
- Genre: Avant-garde metal, classical, doom metal, gothic metal, neoclassical dark wave
- Length: 71:27/74:33
- Label: The End Records; Massacre Records
- Producer: Rowan London

Virgin Black chronology
| Sombre Romantic (2001) | Elegant... and Dying (2003) | Requiem – Mezzo Forte (2007) |

Professional ratings
Review scores
| Source | Rating |
|---|---|
| Allmusic | 4.5/5 stars |
| Brave Words & Bloody Knuckles | 6.5/10 |
| Chronicles of Chaos | 7/10 |
| Exclaim! | |
| Powermetal.de | |

Elegant... and Dying is the second studio album by Australian Gothic-doom band Virgin Black. The album was released in June, 2003, on The End Records and Massacre Records. Various publications including The Village Voice praised the album.

Prior to the release of the album, the vocalist Rowan London trained with a professional opera singer, bolstering the album's operatic elements further.

== Track listing ==
- All songs written By Rowan London and Samantha Escarbe, except where otherwise noted.
1. "Adorned in Ashes" – 6:18
2. "Velvet Tongue" – 8:03/8:25 (Rowan London)
3. "And the Kiss of God's Mouth (Part I)" – 1:26 (Samantha Escarbe)
4. "And the Kiss of God's Mouth (Part II)" – 6:19
5. "Renaissance" – 7:02
6. "The Everlasting" – 17:13/19:57
7. "Cult of Crucifixion" – 9:03
8. "Beloved" – 7:27 (Samantha Escarbe)
9. "Our Wings Are Burning" – 8:26

== Personnel ==
=== Virgin Black ===
- Rowan London – lead vocals, keyboards, piano, choir and chorus
- Samantha Escarbe – guitar, cello, choir and chorus
- Craig Edis – guitar, vocals
- Ian Miller – bass, choir and chorus
- Dino Cielo – drums, choir and chorus

=== Additional personnel ===
- Sonia Wilkie (guest) – violin
- Brad and Stephanie Bessel, Carmen Harm, Terella Rosen – choir and chorus vocals

== Production ==
- Produced By Rowan London
- Recorded By Carmen Harm and Aaron Nichols
- Mixed By Carmen Harm
