= Of Wind and Weeping =

Studio album by Mirrorthrone
- Released: 2003
- Recorded: 2002
- Genre: Symphonic black metal, avant-garde metal
- Length: 50:22
- Label: Red Stream Inc.
- Producer: Vladimir Cochet

Mirrorthrone chronology
Of Wind and Weeping (2003)	Carriers of Dust (2006)

Of Wind and Weeping is the first album by the one-man metal band Mirrorthrone.

== Track listing ==
1. "Racines Dénudées" – 11:05
2. "Florilège Lunatique Occultement Révélateur et Néantisation Caduque Engendrée" – 8:07
3. "The Four Names of the Living Threatening Stone" – 8:29
4. "Aborted" – 3:23
5. "Beyond the Mirrorthrone" – 6:53
6. "The Notion of Perfect" – 5:38
7. "Moi Mort..." – 5:43
8. "Of Wind and Weeping" – 3:20

== Credits ==
- Vladimir Cochet - Vocals, Guitars, Bass, Synthesizer & drum programming
- Marthe - Female Vocals
