= Lustre (musical project) =

Swedish black metal band

- Origin: Östersund, Sweden
- Genres: Ambient black metal, ambient, electronic
- Years active: 2008 – present
- Labels: Nordvis Produktion
- Members: Nachtzeit
- Website: www.facebook.com/lustresweden

Lustre is a Swedish black metal band; the musical project of Henrik Sunding who goes under the pseudonym "Nachtzeit". Lustre began in 2008 after the dissolve of The Burning. Prior to both, Sunding also used to be a drummer of the band Hypothermia.

Unlike most black metal artists, Lustre uses guitars and vocals as background instruments and instead uses keyboards and synths as the primary instrument. Lustre's lyrical themes include nature, darkness, mysticism, and spirituality.

== Discography ==
Title	Released
Serenity (EP)	November 2008
Night Spirit	May 2009
Neath The Black Veil (Demo)	September 2009
Welcome Winter (EP)	December 2009
A Glimpse of Glory	September 2010
They Awoke To The Scent of Spring	March 2012
Of Strength and Solace (EP)	April 2012
Feigur / Lustre (Split with Feigur)	October 2012
Lost In Lustrous Night Skies (Compilation)	February 2013
Wonder	September 2013
A Spark of Times Old (EP)	September 2013
Vixerunt (Split with Aus der Transzendenz)	November 2013
Through The Ocean To The Stars (Split with Elderwind)	February 2014
Neath Rock and Stone (Single)	April 2014
Phantom (EP)	February 2015
Blossom	April 2015
Still Innocence	November 2017
The Ashes of Light	April 2020
A Thirst for Summer Rain	August 2022
