= King of Asgard =

Swedish metal band

- Origin: Mjölby/Vadstena/Skänninge/Motala – Östergötland, Sweden
- Genres: Viking metal, melodic death metal, melodic black metal
- Years active: 2008–present
- Labels: Trollmusic, Metal Blade
- Members: Karl Beckman, Jonas Albrektsson, Ted Sjulmark, Mathias Westman
- Website: King of Asgard on Facebook

King of Asgard is a Swedish Viking metal band from Östergötland, formed in 2008. The band has released one demo and four full-length albums, most recently svartrviðr in 2021, and is currently signed to Trollmusic.

== History ==
=== Formation, Prince of Maerings demo, and Fi'mbulvintr ===
King of Asgard was formed in 2008 by Karl Beckman and Karsten Larsson, former members of Viking metal act Mithotyn. Following the release of their 2009 demo, Prince of Maerings, King of Asgard signed with Metal Blade Records. The band's debut album, Fi'mbulvintr, was released in 2010.

=== ... to North ===
The band's second record, ... to North, was released by Metal Blade Records in 2012. In early 2012, bassist Jonas Albrektsson was quoted on Blabbermouth as saying, "... to North takes off pretty much where Fi'mbulvintr left off, so to say, with a natural development, more varied songs and structures. It's a development of our sound which will be recognized by old fans." Albrektsson went on to say, "this time around I've been more involved in the writing process along with Karl, which kind of shines through, giving the songs a wider perspective." A video was released for the album's lead single, "The Nine Worlds Burn".

Digipak versions of the album feature a bonus cover of Isengard's "Winterskugge".

=== Karg ===
Karg followed in 2014. It would be King of Asgard's final release through their longtime label, Metal Blade Records.

Karg's release was preceded on 19 May 2014 by the debut of its first single, "The Runes of Hel", which featured an accompanying video.

Metal Injection noted a shift in the band's musical direction from the style of King of Asgard's previous outings, stating that Karg "continues to elaborate on their traditional Viking metal, but looming within it is an ominous forecast of the black metal variety".

The album features a cover of Bathory's "Total Destruction".

=== Signing with Trollmusic, taudr ===
In 2016, King of Asgard announced they had left Metal Blade Records to join Swedish label Trollmusic. According to the label, the band's fourth release, taudr, was recorded in June, and was expected to see release in October 2016.

On 16 August 2016, King of Asgard announced that the mastering of taudr had been completed at Kalthallen Studios. The album was recorded and mixed by Magnus Andersson at Sweden's Endarker Studios. It was released on 17 March 2017.

=== svartrviðr ===
King of Asgard's second album with Trollmusic, svartrviðr, was released in 2021. It continued their development towards longer songs and towards black metal.

== Personnel ==
=== Current members ===
- Karl Beckman (2008–present) (guitar/vocals)
- Jonas Albrektsson (2009–present) (bass)
- Ted Sjulmark (2015–present) (guitar)
- Matthias Westman (2015–present) (drums)

=== Former members ===
- Karsten Larsson (2008–2015) (drums)
- Lars Tängmark (2010–2015) (guitars)

== Discography ==
=== Studio albums ===
- Fi'mbulvintr (Metal Blade Records, 2010)
- ... to North (Metal Blade Records, 2012)
- Karg (Metal Blade Records, 2014)
- taudr (Trollmusic, 2017)
- svartrviðr (Trollmusic, 2021)

=== Demos ===
- Prince of Maerings (self-released, 2009)
