= Mirrorthrone =

Swiss band

- Origin: Montreux, Switzerland
- Genres: Symphonic black metal, avant-garde metal
- Years active: 2000–present
- Label: Red Stream Inc.
- Members: Vladimir Cochet
- Website: mirrorthrone.com

Mirrorthrone is a Swiss one-man symphonic black metal band formed by Vladimir Cochet in 2000.

== Biography ==
Mirrorthrone was formed in 2000 by Vladimir Cochet, the only member of the one-man project. In late 2001 and 2002, two demo CDs were recorded, which drew the attention of label Red Stream Inc. After signing with them, Cochet released three albums.

== Controversy ==
The song "A Scream to Express the Hate of a Race" (2006) drew criticism for lyrics that were perceived as racist. Cochet contested this in a public statement where he explained that the song is intended to target "nihilism" and "the human race in its entirety."

== Band members ==
- Vladimir Cochet – vocals, guitars, bass, synthesizer, drum programming

== Discography ==
- Of Wind and Weeping (Red Stream Inc., 2003)
- Carriers of Dust (2006)
- Gangrene (2008)
