= Enslaved (Steel Attack album) =

Studio album by Steel Attack
- Released: October 8, 2004
- Studios: Black Lounge Studios, Sweden
- Genre: Power metal
- Length: 47:04
- Labels: Arise Records in Europe, King Records in Asia
- Producer: Steel Attack

Steel Attack chronology
Predator of the Empire (2003)	Enslaved (2004)	Diabolic Symphony (2006)

Professional ratings
Review scores
Source	Rating
Rock Hard	8/10 stars
Scream Magazine	4/6 stars
Powermetal.de	
Vampster	

Enslaved is the fourth studio album by Swedish power metal band Steel Attack.

== Track listing ==
All lyrics are written by Ronny Hemlin; all music is composed by Steel Attack.

No.	Title	Length
1.	"Gates Of Heaven"	5:28
2.	"Out Of The Flames"	4:46
3.	"Forsaken"	6:13
4.	"Bless My Sins"	5:24
5.	"Immortal Hate"	5:09
6.	"Son Of A Thousand Souls"	5:12
7.	"Enslaved"	4:18
8.	"Voices"	4:44
9.	"When You Dream"	4:50
10.	"Afraid No More" (Digipack Bonus Track)	6:37
11.	"Ease My Pain" (Japanese Bonus Track)

== Personnel ==
- Ronny Hemlin – vocals
- John Allan – guitar
- Johan Jalonen – guitar
- Anden Andersson – bass
- Mike Stark – drums
