= The Phoenix Throne =

Studio album by Dead to Fall
- Released: April 4, 2006
- Genre: Metalcore
- Length: 42:27
- Label: Victory

Dead to Fall chronology
Villainy & Virtue (2004)	The Phoenix Throne (2006)	Are You Serious? (2008)

The Phoenix Throne is the third studio album from Chicago-based metalcore band Dead to Fall. The album contains some of the longest songs the band has recorded to date, with "Guillotine Dream" and "Doomed to Failure" each going over 6 minutes in length.

The album was rated a 6.5 out of 10 by Blabbermouth.net.

== Track listing ==
No.	Title	Length
1.	"All My Heroes Have Failed Me"	3:22
2.	"Womb Portals"	4:45
3.	"Smoke and Mirrors"	2:58
4.	"Servant of Sorrow"	3:29
5.	"Chum Fiesta"	2:23
6.	"Guillotine Dream"	6:15
7.	"Doomed to Failure"	6:07
8.	"Corpse Collector"	3:05
9.	"The Reptile Lord"	5:06
10.	"Death and Rebirth"	4:57
Total length:		42:27

== Credits ==
Performers

- Chad M. Fjerstad – Bass
- Jonathan D. Hunt – Vocals
- Timothy Java – Drums
- Logan Kelly – Guitars
- Aaron Nelson – Guitars

Additional Credits

- Art Direction, Artwork and Design - Paul A. Romano
- Produced by Eric Rachel and Dead to Fall.

== Reception ==
- HCS.net
- Punknews.org link

== Trivia ==
- Some digital media players, such as iTunes, recognize the track Smoke and Mirrors as "Pawns."
- Michael Romeo of Symphony X provides the orchestra/choir present in "Death and Rebirth."
