= The Wake (Scott Kelly album) =

Studio album by Scott Kelly
- Released: 2008
- Genre: Country/Folk
- Label: Neurot Recordings
- Producer: Scott Kelly

Scott Kelly chronology
Spirit Bound Flesh (2001)	The Wake (2008)

Professional ratings
Review scores
Source	Rating
Pitchfork Media	(6.5/10)
Allmusic	4.5/5 stars

The Wake is the second solo album by Scott Kelly from Neurosis. It is largely acoustic guitar music which is much different stylistically from the output of his primary band.

== Track listing ==
1. The Ladder in My Blood
2. Figures
3. Saturn's Eye
4. The Searcher
5. Catholic Blood
6. In My World
7. Remember Me
