= Flactorophia =

Ecuadorian grindcore band

Background information
- Origin: Quito, Ecuador
- Genre: Christian metal • goregrind
- Years active: 2006–2008
- Past members: José Barragán

Flactorophia was an Ecuadorian Christian goregrind band. Consisting solely of José Barragán, the band was active from 2006 until 2008, when Barragán was killed in the Quito Ultratumba nightclub fire. The band produced a single EP, Redemption of the Flesh. It also contributed to two split albums and a compilation album.

== History ==
José Barragán, the sole member of Flactorophia, performed all of the instruments and vocals as well as the project's production. The band debuted with the EP Redemption of the Flesh on 4 July 2006. Drum machine beat tracks for two songs were included on Drum Machine Compilation #3 from Einsteinium later that year. In On 20 August 2007, the band appeared on a split album, 6-Way Sin Decomposition, alongside Demonic Dismemberment, Eternal Mystery, Vomitous Discharge, Engravor, and Vomitorial Corpulence. The split had originally been planned as a four-way but, after work on it stalled, it was expanded to six artists after Vomitorial Corpulence's drummer, Chris Valentine, approached the artists about joining on with newly recorded material as well as bringing on Engravor. Flactorophia also signed on to Christ Core Records, a label run by Chris Valentine. In December of 2007, Flactorophia announced another split album, with Nothin' Suss, Smallpox Aroma, and Lacerated Tissue; the recording, Whorevisceration, was released 31 March 2008. Barragán was killed less than a month later in the Quito Ultratumba nightclub fire. John Jackson of The Metal Resource attributes Flactorophia's obscurity to it managing only one solo release before Barragán's untimely demise. Ten years and a day later than the fire, The Bearded Dragon label reissued Redemption of the Flesh.

== Style and lyrics ==
The musical style of Flactorophia was grindcore, specifically goregrind, with a Christian message. Reviewer Lloyd Harp labeled Flactorophia "proper" grindcore, without obvious death metal, hardcore, deathcore, or noisecore elements. Barragán's vocals were variously described as pukes, gutturals, squeals, and growls. The drum machine programming was also noted in reviews for both frenzy and creativity. In addition to English, some songs from the project were written in Spanish.

== Discography ==
- 2006 – Redemption of the Flesh – EP
- 2006 – Drum Machine Compilation #3 – contributed "Regurgitation Demons Outside the Flesh" and "The Sin Eater"
- 2007 – 6-Way Sin Decomposition (split album with Demonic Dismemberment, Eternal Mystery, Vomitous Discharge, Engravor, and Vomitorial Corpulence)
- 2008 – Whorevisceration (split album with Nothin' Suss, Smallpox Aroma, and Lacerated Tissue)
