= Virgin Black =

Australian metal band

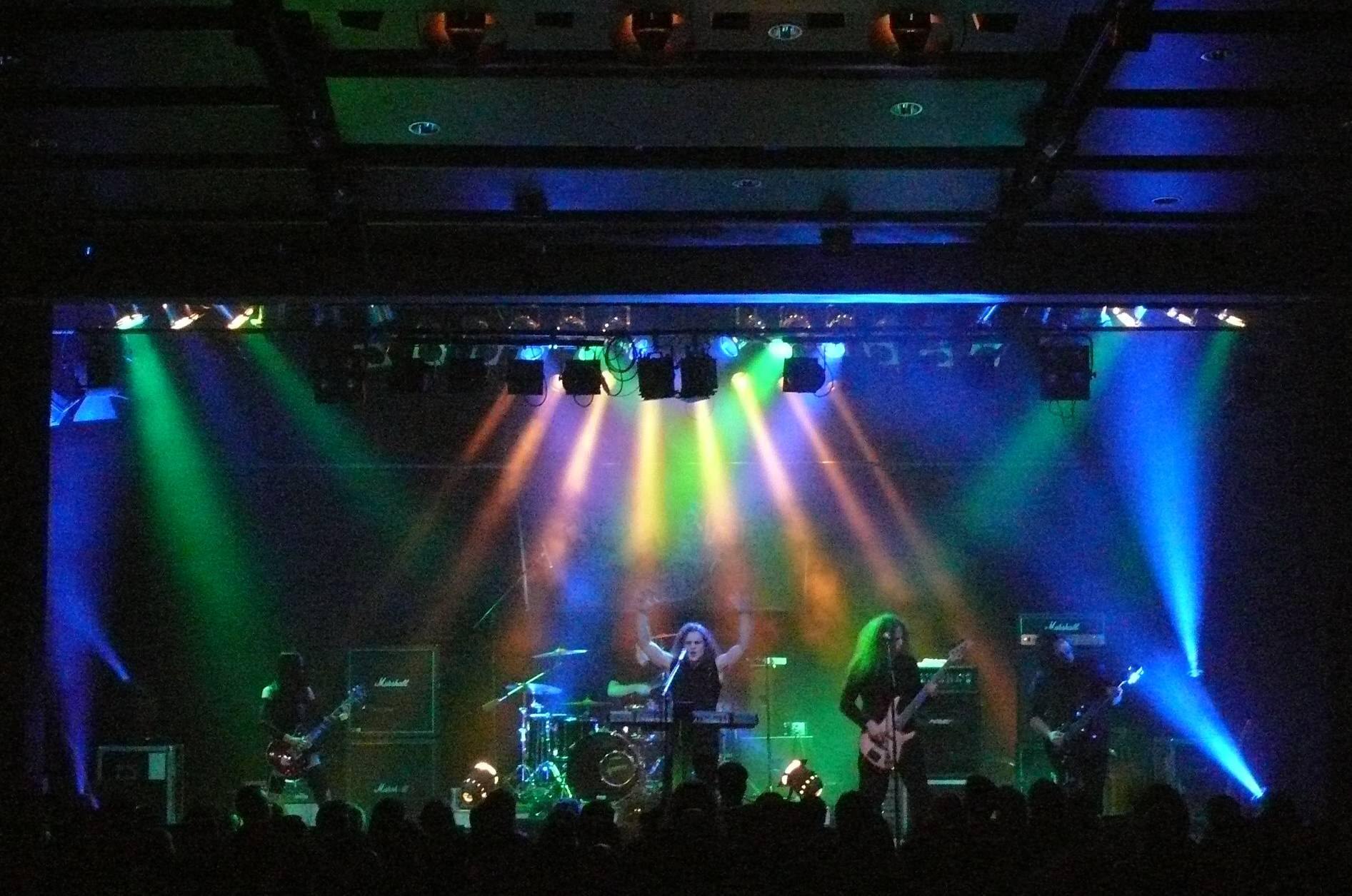
- Virgin Black at Elements of Rock in 2007

Background information
- Origin: Adelaide, Australia
- Genres: Doom metal, gothic metal, symphonic gothic metal, avant-garde metal
- Years active: 1995–2009 (hiatus); 2018–present
- Labels: Massacre; The End; Dark Escapes
- Members: Rowan London; Sesca Scaarba
- Past members: Grayh; Luke Faz; Dino Cielo; Craig Edis; Ian Miller; Aaron Nicholls; Brad Bessel

Virgin Black is an Australian symphonic gothic doom metal band. The band was signed to The End Records (for the United States) and Germany's Massacre Records (for Europe), through which it released four albums and one EP. A fifth album, originally planned for release in 2006, was released independently in 2018. As of 2021, they are signed to Australian record label, Dark Escapes Music. Formed in 1995 in Adelaide, they have achieved international acclaim during their career, receiving praise from such magazines as Orkus, Metal Hammer, Legacy and The Village Voice.

Having changed their line-up several times, Virgin Black currently consists of the founding members and main songwriters: Sesca Scaarba (formerly Samantha Escarbe) (guitar) and Rowan London (keyboard, vocals), with Grayh (bass) and Luke Faz (drums) joining in 2007. The group explains the meaning of its name as "the juxtaposition of purity and humanity's darkness".

== History ==
=== Early days ===
Virgin Black was originally formed in Adelaide by guitarist Sesca Scaarba, and vocalist and keyboards-player Rowan London. In 1995, Virgin Black recorded a four-track self-titled demo in a doom/death style. Due to the rarity and demand for this recording, the band has speculated that it may be re-released at some point. Their Trance EP was released in 1998, and the group began gaining international recognition with that recording. This EP was later included as part of a special limited edition (U.S. only) with the band's debut album, Sombre Romantic.

=== Record deal ===
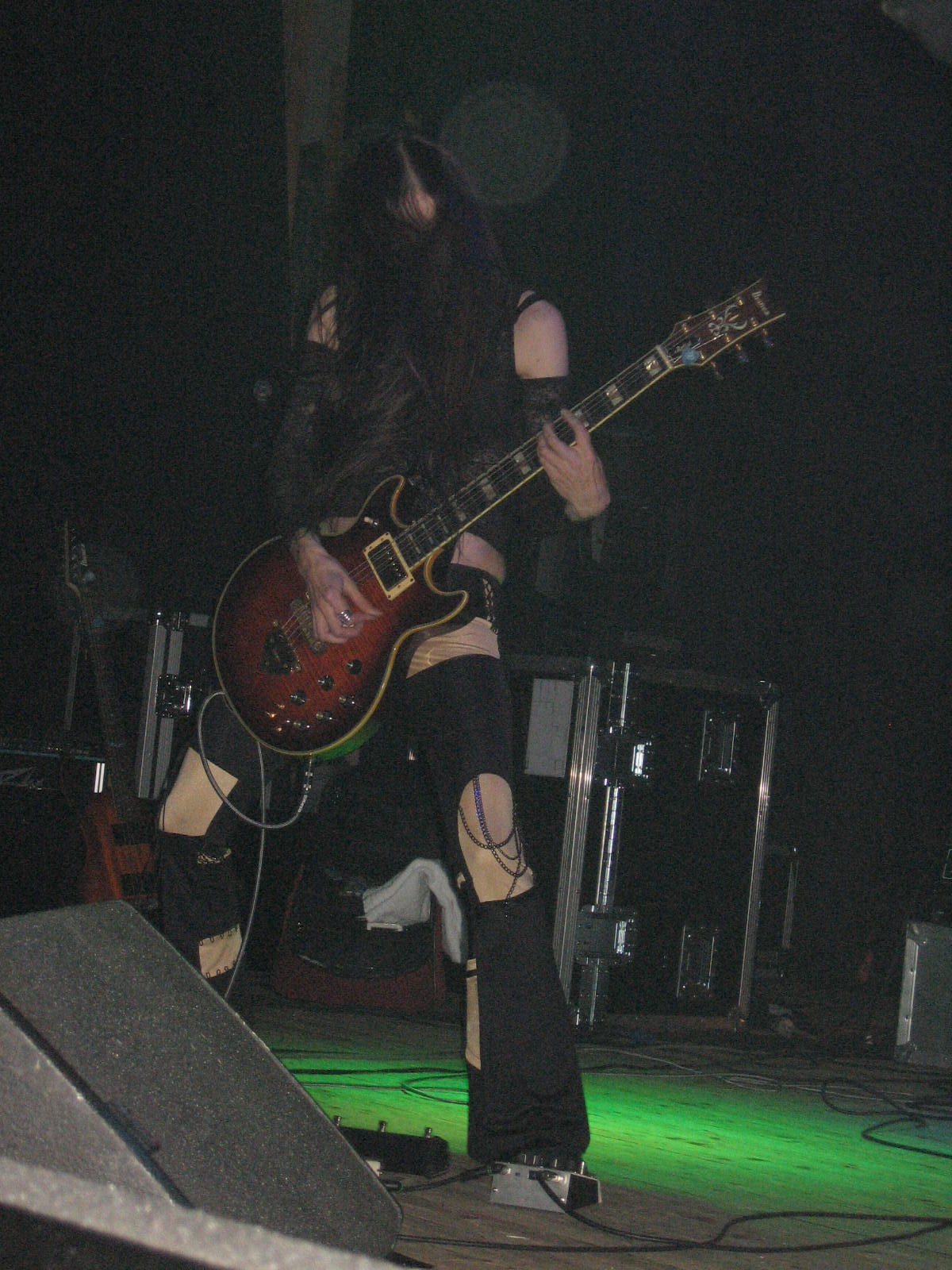
Sesca Scaarba

The group began recording their first full-length album Sombre Romantic in 1999. The album displays an expansively cinematic, symphonic style with London contributing a diverse vocal style from shrieks and growls to soaring melodies and choral chants. On the strength of this self-released debut, Virgin Black signed to Germany's Massacre Records for Europe and also to the U.S. label The End. Both labels then released Sombre Romantic in their territories.

After completing their second album during 2002, Virgin Black played at Germany's Wave-Gotik-Treffen festival in 2003 and did a tour through the US west coast with Agalloch and Antimatter before returning to Australia and conducting a national tour. Elegant... and Dying featured Escarbe contributing cello and guest musician Sonia Wilkie playing flute. It was released in November and a month later the band appeared at the Metal for the Brain festival in Canberra. Early the following year, Virgin Black toured alongside Opeth in Australia, and later did a tour of the Australian east coast capitals with Sydney black metal band Nazxul before making a start on their next recordings.

=== Requiem trilogy ===
Virgin Black's next project began with London and Escarbe composing a series of scores for what was to become the three-volume Requiem set. On 10 March 2006, The End Records issued a press release explaining the upcoming releases. The first part of the trilogy, Requiem - Pianissimo, is a strictly classically oriented album featuring the Adelaide Symphony Orchestra, choral singing, and solo singers. Requiem - Mezzo Forte features music similar to the band's previous releases with the last part Requiem - Fortissimo primarily having a death/doom metal sound. The albums were recorded primarily as the duo of London and Escarbe over the course of almost two years, during which Rowan London suffered the death of his father. Originally designed to be released simultaneously in 2006, on 23 July, The Labels announced that the albums would instead be released during 2007 in a staggered time scale. The second part of the trilogy, Requiem - Mezzo Forte was issued first, on 3 April 2007.

With a new line-up of Escarbe, London, Grayh on bass and drummer Luke Faz. Virgin Black played some Australian shows with Arcturus in March and headlined the Elements of Rock Festival in Switzerland in April. Virgin Black announced a US tour for June and July 2007, and played shows on the east and west coast of the U.S. with To/Die/For and headlined shows in Mexico City, Monterrey, and Guadalajara.

The third part and the second installment in the Requiem trilogy, Requiem - Fortissimo was released on 19 February 2008 by The End Records. The Massacre Records release date remains unknown. Virgin Black played with Amorphis and Samael for a North American tour in fall 2008. Readers of the website Metal Storm voted Requiem Fortissimo for "the best doom metal album of 2008".

On 2 November 2012 it was announced on the band's official Facebook page that "...Virgin Black is still on an extended hiatus but preparing themselves for a return at some stage, and the release of Pianissimo when that happens", and went on to say that "...it might not be for some time yet, but thank you for your patience and continued enthusiasm for the band regardless".

On 4 September 2018, after 10 years of silence, the band posted the first two songs from their long-awaited Pianissimo release. The songs are titled Requiem Aeternum and Dies Irae, with a total duration of 13:12. On 27 September 2018, the band speculated the date for the release of the complete album, scheduled for 30 November of that year, said in its official website that Virgin Black has broken ties with former record companies. In December 2018 the album appeared on YouTube.

On signing with new label Dark Escapes Music, Virgin Black's Requiem trilogy was slated for release to streaming services globally. Requiem - Pianissimo, the first of the trilogy, was released on 30 June 2023 and is to be followed by Requiem - Mezzo Forte on 28 July 2023 and Requiem - Fortissimo on 18 August 2023. While the latter two albums were available on some streaming services in North America, this is the first time they will be available globally.

=== Virgin Black Return ===
On 25 November 2021, Virgin Black released Sombre Romantic on streaming services globally after signing with independent record label Dark Escapes Music. A cinematic music video for Walk Without Limbs was released on YouTube to accompany the release.

This was followed by Elegant... and Dying a year later on 25 November 2022, and Requiem - Pianissimo on 30 June 2023. This is the first time Requiem - Pianissimo has been available on streaming services since its original release in 2018.

== Musical style ==
Virgin Black's sound has been described as doom metal, gothic metal, symphonic gothic metal, avant-garde metal. A critic described their style as having influences of "dark wave with gothic atmosphere" and "symphonic gothic-doom".

== Members ==
Current

- Sesca Scaarba - guitars, cello (1995–present)
- Rowan London - keyboards, vocals (1995–present)

Former

- Aaron Nicholls - bass (1996–1998)
- Brad Bessell - bass
- Ian Miller - bass
- Craig Edis - guitar (1995–2005), bass (2008), vocals
- Grayh - bass, vocals
- Luke Faz - drums
- Dino Cielo - drums, vocals
- Kelvin Sugars - drums
- David Mason - guitar
- Matt Enright - drums

Live

- Mark Kelson - guitar (2007)
- Matthew Phillips - bass

== Discography ==
=== Demos and EPs ===
- Virgin Black (1996)
- Trance (1998)

=== Albums ===
- Sombre Romantic (2001)
- Elegant... and Dying (2003)
- Requiem – Mezzo Forte (2007)
- Requiem – Fortissimo (2008)
- Requiem – Pianissimo (2018)
