= Gangrene (album) =

Studio album by Mirrorthrone
- Released: 2008
- Recorded: 2007
- Genre: Extreme metal, symphonic metal, avant-garde metal
- Length: 64:41
- Label: Red Stream
- Producer: Vladimir Cochet

Mirrorthrone chronology
| Carriers of Dust (2006) | Gangrene (2008) |

Professional ratings
Review scores
| Source | Rating |
|---|---|
| SputnikMusic | 3.5/5 stars |

Gangrene is the third album by Mirrorthrone. The song, "So Frail", is featured in the video game, Brütal Legend.

== Track listing ==
1. Dismay - 11:34
2. No One By My Side - 10:26
3. The Fecal Rebellion - 15:03
4. Ganglion - 8:52
5. Une Existence dont plus Personne ne Jouit - 12:06
6. So Frail - 6:40

== Credits ==
- Vladimir Cochet - Vocals, Guitars, Bass, Synthesizer & drum programming.
