= Carnal Repercussions =

Studio album by Salt the Wound
- Released: February 5, 2008
- Recorded: August–September 2007
- Genres: Deathcore, melodic death metal
- Length: 36:30
- Label: Rotten Records
- Producer: Cole Martinez

Salt the Wound chronology
Salt the Wound (2007)	Carnal Repercussions (2008)	Ares (2009)

Carnal Repercussions is the debut full-length album by American deathcore band Salt the Wound. The album was released on February 5, 2008 through Rotten Records.

== Track listing ==
No.	Title	Length
1.	"The Beginning"	1:37
2.	"Better Than This"	2:45
3.	"The Conformist"	2:56
4.	"We'll Sleep Until Sunset"	2:25
5.	"Gloves"	3:07
6.	"Gannon"	2:39
7.	"A Slight Burning Sensation"	2:29
8.	"Peas and Carrots"	4:10
9.	"I Swear The Visine Is For My Allergies"	3:39
10.	"The Rape and Pillage of Spisville"	3:20
11.	"Carnal Repercussions"	3:56
12.	"The End"	3:32
Total length:		36:30

== Reception ==
- About.com link

== Personnel ==
Salt the Wound

- Jake Scott – guitar
- Vince Stropki – guitar
- Brian Martinez – bass
- Kevin Schaefer - vocals
- Brandon Tabor - drums

Production

- Produced by Cole Martinez
