= Steel Attack =

Swedish power metal band

- Also known as: Mayers Eve (1995–1997)
- Origin: Sala, Västmanland Sweden
- Genres: Power metal, heavy metal
- Years active: 1997–present
- Label: Massacre Records
- Members: John Allan, Ronny Hemlin, Johan Jalonen, Johan Löfgren, Peter Morén
- Past members: Andreas De Vera (1997-2001), Dennis Vestman (1997-2004), Michhael Bohlin (1997-1998), Roger Raw (drums, 1999-2000), Dick Johnson (vocals, 2000-03), Patrick Späth (bass, 2001-04), Mike Stark (drums, 2001-05)Anden Andersson (bass, 2004-07), Tony Elfving (drums, 2005-07), Simon Johansson (guitar, 2007-09)

Steel Attack is a Swedish power metal band from Sala, formed in 1995.

== Biography ==
Stefan Westerberg and Dennis Vestman formed Mayer's Eve in 1995. The band changed their name to Steel Attack in 1997 due to many coming and going members.

The band started out with the style of European power metal bands, with lyrical content about epic battles, dragons and swords mixed with high-pitched vocals. Albums from that time is Where Mankind Fails (1999), Fall into Madness (2001) and the album Predator of the Empire (2003). However, with a change of vocalist in 2003 (Ronny Hemlin), the band and the 2004 album Enslaved got a new "direction," both musically and lyrically. Their old power metal sound was re-wrought to be more aggressive, and the standard lyrical content of most power metal bands (dragons, swords, etc.) was no longer used. Ronny brought more mystical, mature, religion-related lyrics, in order to fit the band's new heavier sound.

With the 2006 release Diabolic Symphony, the band developed further to include more progressive metal elements. Diabolic Symphony is their most diverse album to date. New to the album was the use of keyboards, which helped to take a big step forward in creating a bigger, epic sound.

During 2007 three members decided to leave the band, Anden Andersson, Tony Elfving and Johan Jalonen. Since then, all three positions have been replaced, namely Johan Löfgren (bass), Peter Morén (drums) and Simon Johansson (guitars).

This new line-up of the band recorded their new album "Carpe DiEnd" during end of 2007/beginning of 2008 and the album was released 22 February 2008 by Massacre Records.

In the beginning of 2009 guitarist Simon Johansson quit the band for personal reasons, and his replacement was the returning guitarist Johan Jalonen Penn.

On 23 November, Steel Attack parted ways with Hemlin, Löfgren, and Morén for reasons beyond their control.

On 29 November, the original line up got back to where it all started with from the albums "Where Mankind Fails" and "Fall into Madness."

== Band members ==
=== Current line-up ===
- Steve Steel (Stefan Westerberg) (1995–2001, 2009–) – vocals & bass (Carnal Forge, In Thy Dreams, Leech, Asperity, Kryptillusion, World Below)
- John Allan – guitar (1998–)
- Dennis Vestman – guitar (1995–2003, 2009–) (Carnal Forge, Soulskinner, Grand Design)
- Andreas Vollmer – drums (1996–1999, 2000–2001, 2009–)

=== Former members ===
Vocals:

- Dick Johnson (2002–2003)
- Ronny Hemlin (2003–2009) Tad Morose

Guitar:

- Johan Jalonen (2004–2007, 2009)
- Simon Johansson (2007–2009) (Abstrakt Algebra, Memory Garden, Fifth Reason, Bibleblack, Wolf, Soilwork)

Bass:

- Freddie (1995–1996)
- Patrick Späth (2002–2003) (Soulskinner)
- Anden Andersson (2003–2007)
- Johan Löfgren (2007–2009)

Drums:

- Roger Raw (1999–2000) (Wombbath)
- Mike Stark (2001–2005) (Into Desolation)
- Tony Elfving (2005–2007)
- Peter Morén (2007–2009) Tad Morose

== Discography ==
| Title | Release date | Label |
|---|---|---|
| Where Mankind Fails | 6 June 1999 | AFM Records |
| Fall Into Madness | 16 June 2001 | AFM Records |
| Predator Of The Empire | 15 April 2003 | Arise Records |
| Enslaved | 8 October 2004 | Arise Records |
| Diabolic Symphony | 21 April 2006 | Massacre Records |
| Carpe DiEnd | 22 February 2008 | Massacre Records |
