= Carpe DiEnd =

Studio album by Steel Attack
- Released: February 22, 2008
- Recorded: Sonic Train Studios, Gothenburg and SolnaSound Studio, Solna
- Genre: Power metal
- Length: 48:27
- Label: Massacre Records
- Producers: Simon Johansson, Ronny Hemlin & Mike Wead

Steel Attack chronology
Diabolic Symphony (2006)	Carpe DiEnd (2008)

Capre DiEnd is Swedish power metal band Steel Attack's sixth and last studio album. It was released on February 22, 2008, through Massacre Records. Three new members (Simon Johansson, Johan Löfgren, and Peter Morén) joined with this album. A video was shot for the song "Angels" with director Owe Lingvall from Nocturnal Rites.

Scream Magazine praised the style of power metal, "with voluminous vocals, good tunes and manly choruses". Furthermore, the guitar work was "snacks". The rating was a strong 5 out of 6. Metal.de only rated it slightly lower, 8 out of 10.

== Track listing ==
All lyrics are written by Ronny Hemlin; all music is composed by Steel Attack.

No.	Title	Length
1.	"Carpe DiEnd" (intro)	0:51
2.	"The Evil in Me"	5:09
3.	"I Keep Falling"	4:52
4.	"Holy Is Evil"	5:02
5.	"Perpetual Solitude"	4:35
6.	"For Whom I Bleed?"	3:58
7.	"Angels"	5:13
8.	"Entrance to Heaven Denied"	4:35
9.	"Crawl"	5:08
10.	"Never Again"	4:34
11.	"Beyond the Light"	4:30

== Personnel ==
- Ronny Hemlin - Vocals
- John Allan - Guitar
- Simon Johansson - Guitar
- Johan Löfgren - Bass
- Peter Morén - Drums
