= Dead to Fall =

American metalcore band

- Origin: Gurnee, Illinois, U.S.
- Genres: Metalcore
- Years active: 1999–2008, 2015, 2017–present
- Label: Victory
- Members: Jonathan Hunt; Justin Jakimiak; Antone Jones; Bryan Lear; Timothy Java
- Past members: Aaron Cosgrove; Andy Dalen; Matt Hartman; Brad King; Evan Kaplan; Seth Nichols; Matt Matera; Aaron Nelson; Chris Nolan; Logan Kelly; Phil Merriman; Chad Fjerstad; Daniel Craig

Dead to Fall is an American metalcore band from Gurnee, Illinois. Formed in 1999, it drew influences from Gothenburg metal, death metal, and other genres. Their first two albums reached combined sales of 60,000 copies in the US alone.

Dead to Fall broke up on April 6, 2008 due to financial and personal problems. In 2015, The band did a small reunion tour with the remaining previous members of the band. The tour was supporting Darkest Hour for the tenth anniversary of their album Undoing Ruin. The band announced April 5, 2017 that they are planning to release a new album in 2018.

== Members ==
Current members

- Jonathan Hunt – lead vocals (1999–2008, 2015, 2017–present)
- Timothy Java – drums (2004–2008, 2015, 2022–present)
- Justin Jakimiak – bass (1999–2005, 2017–present)
- Antone Jones – guitar (1999, 2003, 2017–present)
- Bryan Lear – guitar (1999–2003, 2017–present)

Former members

- Aaron Cosgrove – vocals (1999)
- Andy Dalen – vocals (1999)
- Matt Hartman – guitar (1999–2002)
- Daniel Craig – drums (1999–2002, 2003, 2017–2022)
- Brad King – drums (2002–2003)
- Ryan Smith - drums (2003)
- Jeff Lohrber - drums (2003)
- Evan Kaplan – drums (2003–2004)
- Seth Nichols – guitar (2002–2003)
- Matt Matera – guitar (2003–2005)
- Aaron Nelson – guitar (2005–2007)
- Chris Nolan – bass (2005)
- Logan Kelly – lead guitar (2004–2008, 2015)
- Phil Merriman – rhythm guitar (2007–2008, 2015)
- Chad Fjerstad – bass guitar (2005–2008, 2015)

Timeline

== Discography ==
- Everything I Touch Falls to Pieces (September 10, 2002)
- Villainy & Virtue (September 14, 2004)
- The Phoenix Throne (April 4, 2006)
- Are You Serious? (February 19, 2008)
