= Remember the Day (album) =

Studio album by Exit Ten
- Released: 16 June 2008
- Recorded: Criterion Studios
- Genre: Post-hardcore; Metalcore; Progressive metal
- Producer: Mark Williams

Exit Ten chronology
This World They'll Drown (2006)	Remember the Day (2008)

Professional ratings
Review scores
Source	Rating
Rock Sins	5/5 stars
Kerrang	KKKK
Metal Hammer	9/10 stars
RockSound	8/10 stars
Total-Guitar	3/5 stars
Subba-Cultcha	4/5 stars
Ultimate Reviewer	9/10 stars

Remember the Day is the first full-length album by the British Progressive metal band Exit Ten.

== Track listing ==
1. "Technically Alive" – 3:51
2. "Godspeed" – 3:37
3. "Resume Ignore" – 3:40
4. "Warriors" – 3:42
5. "Remember the Day" – 3:59
6. "Perish in the Flames" – 3:48
7. "Reveal Yourself" – 3:23
8. "Out of Sight" – 4:42
9. "Fine Night" – 4:25
10. "Something to Say" – 6:30

== Credits ==
- Ryan Redman - Vocals
- Stuart Steele - Guitar, backing vocals
- Joe Ward - Guitar
- James Steele - Bass
- Chris Steele - Drums
- Mark Williams - Production

== Critical response ==
The album received a "KKKK" (equivalent to 4/5) rating in Kerrang! magazine. Reviewer Steve Beebee described the album as "a mighty firm introductory handshake", singling out the tracks Technically Alive and Resume Ignore for specific praise and suggesting that the album might appeal to fans of Deftones and Still Remains.
