= Ley Lines (album) =

2008 album by Embrace the End

Studio album by Embrace the End
- Released: April 15, 2008
- Recorded: 2007
- Genre: Metalcore, mathcore, deathcore
- Length: 37:47
- Label: Century Media
- Producer: Alan Douches

Embrace the End chronology
Counting Hallways to the Left (2005)	Ley Lines (2008)

Professional ratings
Review scores
Source	Rating
Allmusic	link

Ley Lines is the second full-length album by Sacramento metalcore band Embrace the End. It was released on April 15, 2008, through Century Media Records. This is the first album by Embrace The End to only feature one vocalist. In February 2009, a video was released for the track, "Denim on Denim Hate Crime". The name refers to ley lines, the paranormal concept of geographic lines of energy based on the placement of landmarks.

== Track listing ==
1. "Cop in a Cage" - (3:32)
2. "Denim on Denim Hate Crime" - (2:06)
3. "Intensity in Ten Cities" - (4:08)
4. "Trainwreck on the John Galt Line" - (4:30)
5. "Ride It Like You Stole It" (featuring guest vocals by former vocalist Pat Piccolo of Embrace The End) - (3:33)
6. "Pity and the Road To Bimini" - (4:19)
7. "Overnighter" - (3:57)
8. "Sport The New Plague" - (1:00)
9. "Ley Lines" - (6:04)
10. "The God Stitch" - (4:38)

== Credits ==
- Jesse Alford – Vocals
- Chris Topher – Guitar
- Spencer Daly – Guitar, Vocals
- Addison Quarles – Bass
- Bart Mullis – Drums
