= Horror (With Blood Comes Cleansing album) =

Studio album by With Blood Comes Cleansing
- Released: January 22, 2008
- Recorded: 2007
- Genre: Deathcore
- Length: 31:07
- Label: Victory

With Blood Comes Cleansing chronology
Golgotha (2006)	Horror (2008)	With Blood Comes Cleansing (2025)

Professional ratings
Review scores
Source	Rating
Indie Vision Music	9/10
Sputnikmusic	3.0/5

Horror is the second studio album by American deathcore band With Blood Comes Cleansing. Released on January 22, 2008, by Victory Records to mixed reviews, it deals with the subject of the end of days or Armageddon.

== Track listing ==
1. "Intro" — 0:36
2. "Hematidrosis" — 3:10
3. "Lash Upon Lash" — 2:33
4. "Forsaken" — 2:35
5. "Filthy Stains" — 2:47
6. "The Suffering" — 2:52
7. "Blood and Fire" — 2:47
8. "Abaddon's Horde" — 3:04
9. "Horror" — 2:19
10. "Carnivorous Consumption" — 3:41
11. "Damnation" — 2:17
12. "Eternal Reign" — 2:27

== Personnel ==
- Dean Atkinson – vocals
- Jeremy Sims – guitar
- Scott Erickson – guitar
- Dennis Frazier – bass
- Matt Fidler – drums
- Zeuss – Producer
