= Embrace the End =

American metalcore band

- Origin: Sacramento, California, United States
- Genres: Metalcore, mathcore
- Years active: 1999–present (on hiatus since 2008)
- Label: Century Media Records
- Members: Jesse Alford; Christopher McMahon; Addison Quarles; Bart Mullis; Spencer Daly
- Website: www.embracetheendoftheworld.com

Embrace the End is a metalcore band from Sacramento, California, formed in 1999. Originally consisting of only four members, the band went through several line-up changes, at one point having as many as six members, including two vocalists. However, shortly after the departure of vocalist Pat Piccolo following the release of their major label debut in 2005, they decided to continue with only Jesse Alford on vocals. Throughout their history, they featured members of the bands First Blood, Killing the Dream, and Alcatraz. After a series of small independent releases with various line-ups, Counting Hallways to the Left was released on CD in summer 2005 on Abacus Records. Steady touring for band occurred in the years that followed across the United States, through the release of their second and final album Ley Lines in 2008. The band has since been on indefinite hiatus, engaging in various independent musical projects.

== Band members ==
- Jesse Alford – vocals
- Christopher McMahon – Guitar
- Addison Quarles – Bass
- Bart Mullis – drums
- Spencer Daly – Guitar, vocals

== Former members ==
(from most recent to oldest)

- Daniel Borman – Bass
- Joel Adams – Guitar
- Pat Piccolo – Vocals
- Karl Metts – Guitar
- Louie Giovanni – Bass
- Kyle Dixon – Guitar
- Josh Akers – Vocals
- Ryan Hayes - Drums

== Discography ==
=== Full lengths ===
- It All Begins With One Broken Dream (2001) Dark Vision Records
- Counting Hallways to the Left (2005) Abacus Records
- Ley Lines (2008) Century Media Records

=== Demos ===
- S/T Demo Tape (2000)

=== Vinyl ===
- S/T 7" (2003) Mokita Records

=== Splits ===
- Embrace The End vs. The End of Six Thousand Years (2006) Still Life Records
