= In Loving Memory (Beneath the Sky album) =

Studio album by Beneath the Sky
- Released: May 11, 2010
- Genre: Metalcore, deathcore
- Length: 43:06
- Label: Victory Records

Beneath the Sky chronology
The Day the Music Died (2008)	In Loving Memory (2010)

Professional ratings
Review scores
Source	Rating
AllMusic	3/5 stars

Beneath the Sky's third and final studio album, titled In Loving Memory, was released on May 11, 2010. The album's release came after the band's short break up starting in August 2008, and ending in March 2009.

== Track listing ==
All music is composed by Beneath the Sky.

No.	Title	Length
1.	"The Opening"	0:48
2.	"Sorry, I'm Lost"	3:11
3.	"Tears, Bones, and Desire"	3:18
4.	"Terror Starts at Home"	3:10
5.	"A Tale from the Northside"	3:11
6.	"In Loving Memory"	5:05
7.	"To Die For"	4:02
8.	"Blood and Separation"	2:37
9.	"Static"	2:51
10.	"Embrace" (The song "Embrace" ends at 4:30. An untitled hidden track begins at 9:30, after 5 minutes of silence. In the hidden track you can hear a snore and a piece of music accompanied by a guitar.)	14:53
Total length:		43:06

== Personnel ==
Beneath the Sky

- Joey Nelson – unclean vocals
- Jeff Nelson – guitar
- Kevin Stafford – guitar/clean vocals
- Randy Barnes – bass
- Bryan Cash – drums

Production and design

- Produced, engineered, and mixed by Josh Schroeder of Random Awesome recording studio.

== Notes ==
The song "Terror Starts at Home" takes its name from an episode of Six Feet Under where a main character paints those words on her bedroom wall. The story in the song's music video is inspired by the 2005 film Hard Candy.
