= With Blood Comes Cleansing =

American Christian deathcore band

Background information
- Origin: Albany, Georgia, United States
- Genres: Deathcore; Christian metal
- Years active: 2005–2010, 2022–present
- Labels: Blood & Ink, Victory
- Members: Jeremy Sims; Scott Erickson; Michael Crain; Zach Lewis; Robert Manzone
- Past members: Dean Atkinson; Josh Pearson; Doug McMillan; Darrell Bentley; Hank Day; Michael Sasser; Spence Erickson; Jon Stripling; Matt Fidler; Tyler Holt; Greg Titus; Dennis Fraizer

With Blood Comes Cleansing is an American Christian deathcore band from Albany, Georgia, United States.

== History ==
With Blood Comes Cleansing started in February 2005. After touring, several member changes, and releasing a six-song EP, With Blood Comes Cleansing signed on with Virginia-based Blood & Ink Records in February 2006. That summer they released their first full-length album, Golgotha. Since then, the band has been touring, and recently moved to a bigger record label, Victory Records, in February 2007. They released their second album, Horror, in January 2008, through Victory Records.

On 10 July 2008, With Blood Comes Cleansing decided to stop touring full-time and focus on their personal endeavors. Dean moved to Chicago, Illinois, with his wife, but has recently returned to South Georgia. Dennis, Scott, and Spence are all living in Albany, Georgia. Michael and Jeremy currently live in Atlanta, Georgia. The band continues to play shows whenever possible but has no future plans to make a comeback or release any new records. Michael and Dean will be sharing the responsibility of vocalist.

In November 2022, the band announced they would be reuniting in 2023 sans Dean, as well announcing they had pressed 300 copies of their debut album "Golgotha" on vinyl via Secret Swarm Records which sold out in less than two minutes.

They have been announced to play at Furnace Fest 2023.

On February 4, 2024, it was announced Michael Sasser had once again departed the band and was replaced by Robert Manzone.

On January 10, 2025, the band announced their self-titled third album would be released on February 14. It is the band's first album in 17 years.

== Members ==
Current line-up

- Jeremy Sims – guitar (2005–2010, 2022–present)
- Scott Erickson – guitar (2005–2010, 2022–present)
- Michael Crain – bass (2022–present)
- Zach Lewis – drums (2022–present)
- Robert Manzone – vocals (2024–present)

Past members

- Dean Atkinson – vocals (2005, 2006–2010)
- Josh Pearson – guitar (2005)
- Doug McMillan – bass (2005)
- Darrell Bentley – drums (2005)
- Hank Day – drums (2005), guitar (2005)
- Michael Sasser – vocals (2005–2006, 2022–2024)
- Spence Erickson – drums (2005–2006)
- Jon Stripling – bass (2005–2006)
- Matt Fidler – drums (2006–2010)
- Tyler Holt – guitar (2005–2006)
- Greg Titus – bass (2006–2007)
- Dennis Fraizer – bass (2007–2010)

Timeline

== Discography ==
Studio albums

- Golgotha (2006)
- Horror (2008)
- With Blood Comes Cleansing (2025)

EPs

- The Dern EP (2005)

Demos

- The Last Shall Be the First (2005)

Singles

- "Pericardial Effusion" (2023)
- "Euangelion" (2023)
