= Salt the Wound =

American deathcore band

- Origin: Cleveland, Ohio, U.S.
- Genres: Deathcore, melodic death metal
- Years active: 2001–2010, 2011–2015
- Label: Rotten Records
- Members: Kevin Schaefer; Jake Scott; Brian White; Cole Martinez; Brandon Tabor

Salt the Wound was an American deathcore band from Cleveland, Ohio, formed in 2001. The band is signed to Rotten Records and have released three full-length studio albums. After releasing their debut album, Carnal Repercussions, the band toured to an overwhelming extent, leading to their disbandment during the first half of 2010. The group reformed in 2011 with original and new members, and released the album Kill the Crown.

== Biography ==
=== Formation ===
Drummer James Anthony Agrippe and guitar player Mike Kawkabany founded Salt the Wound on September 11, 2001. The group remained a duo until 2003, when they formed a full band with additional members. Vocalist Kevin Schafer joined that year, and the three recruited bassist Abe Zieleniec and Jake Scott as another guitar player.

=== Rotten Records and disestablishment ===
The band released two EPs in 2004 and 2005 respectively, but did not record and release their demo that had them searching for a label until 2007, which led to Salt the Wound being signed to Rotten Records. Salt the Wound achieved underground success in 2008 through their debut studio album, Carnal Repercussions which attracted radio airplay as well as touring requests. By 2009, the album collectively sold 75,000 copies worldwide. By mid of 2009, the group finished recording their second full-length album, entitled Ares, which was released September 15, 2009 and features Matthew Wessoly, their final vocalist incepted into the band before their disbandment.

On October 30, 2009, Salt the Wound announced that they were "hanging up the towel". They held a farewell tour at the beginning of 2010, holding their final show in the states in their hometown of Cleveland.

=== Reformation and second disestablishment ===
Salt the Wound announced in November, 2010 that they have officially reformed (with original vocalist Kevin Schaefer, original guitar player Jake Scott, and The Analyst drummer Brandon Tabor). The band released their third full-length album entitled Kill the Crown in March 2011, which was produced by Brian White. Their next studio album was supposedly confirmed to have been in the works as stated by guitarist Scott, although its status has been unknown since 2014. Their social media pages have been inactive since 2015 as well, thus leading to the presumption of their second disbandment.

== Musical style ==
Salt the Wound's musical style is essentially deathcore but also includes influences of melodic death metal in their music. Their vocal style contains death metal-stylized death growl vocals along with metalcore screaming and "pig squeal" vocals in earlier albums. The drumming is described as "ultra-fast" and includes blast beats. The guitar work features a lower tuning for the rhythm guitar position, but a higher tuning for the lead position, and is usually played at intricate riffs. Salt the Wound have stated that they are primarily influenced by bands such as All Shall Perish, The Black Dahlia Murder, and The Dillinger Escape Plan.

== Band members ==
Current members

- Jake Scott - guitars (2003-2010, 2010–2015)
- Kevin Schaefer - vocals (2003-2008, 2010–2015)
- Brandon Tabor - drums (2008-2009, 2010–2015)
- Brian White - guitars (2011–2015)
- Cole Martinez - bass (2011–2015)

Former members

- James Anthony Agrippe - drums (2001-2006)
- Mike Kawkabany - guitars, vocals (2001-2004)
- Abe Zieleniec - bass (2003)
- Vince Stropki - bass, guitars (2003-2004, 2005–2010)
- Nick Cetrone - drums (2007-2008)
- Brian "Brooklyn" Martinez - bass (2008-2009)
- Tim McCullough - drums (2008-2009)
- Matthew Tanner - vocals (2008-2009)
- Rob Walters - drums (2009-2010)
- Mat Wessoly - vocals (2009-2010)
- Dave Mihalik - bass (2010-2011)

== Discography ==
Albums

- Carnal Repercussions (2008, Rotten)
- Ares (2009, Rotten)
- Kill the Crown (2011, Rotten)

Demos and EPs

- Perceiving the Beauty of Nothing (2003, demo)
- Of Martyrdom (2003, demo)
- It's Taken Too Long (December 2004, demo)
- 3 Song Demo (2004, demo)
- Bedsprings and Bloodshed (2005, self-released EP)
- Demo 2007 (2007, demo)
