= Beneath the Sky =

American metalcore band

- Origin: Cincinnati, Ohio, United States
- Genres: Metalcore, melodic deathcore
- Years active: 2004–2008, 2009–2011, 2012–2014
- Label: Victory
- Past members: Joey Nelson; Jeff Nelson; Nick Scarberry; Chris Profitt; Brandon Sowder; Matt Jones; Kevin Stafford; Randy Barnes; Bryan Cash
- Website: www.myspace.com/beneaththesky

Beneath the Sky was an American metalcore band from Cincinnati, Ohio. The band originally formed in 2004 and disbanded in 2014, having released 3 studio albums through Victory Records.

== Background ==
Beneath the Sky formed in mid-2004 after the collapse of their previous bands Makeshyft and Blind Judgment. Through constant promotion and regional touring, Beneath The Sky have gained fans across the United States and in other parts of the world, including Lithuania. In January 2005, Beneath The Sky released a four-song demo that distributed over 5000 copies before its retirement in late 2005.

Beneath The Sky completed work on a new album at Track Six Recording, Inc. in Cleveland, Ohio with producer Don Debiase and producer/mixer/engineer Brandon Youngs.

Towards the end of 2007, Beneath The Sky were nominated for a Cincinnati Music Award in the Hard rock/Metal category by CityBeat Magazine.

On March 22, 2008 in a MySpace blog, the band confirmed the addition of two new members, guitarist/vocalist Kevin Stafford and drummer Bryan Cash, who both replaced guitarist Chris Profitt and drummer Brandon Sowder. The blog confirmed the departure of keytarist Matt Jones. The band's second album was released on June 24, 2008.

On August 15, 2008 in a Myspace blog, the band announced that they had broken up. The band was signed to Victory Records until 2008.

As of March 13, 2009, Beneath The Sky had been separated due to a problem with their finances but, in a MySpace blog, confirmed that they had reunited and are set to start touring again.

On May 11, 2010, they released their album, "In Loving Memory."

A post on their Facebook page on August 1, 2011 stated that they have nothing to report: "There is nothing to update unfortunately. No new album in the works. But we still like you guys and hopefully you guys still like us! so let's keep posting and sharing good stuff!"

They played a reunion show on January 26, 2013, and according to Chris, there are so far 6 new songs in the works. He said that if a new album is not right for the band, then they will simply release the songs online. The band posted a video of the first test post hiatus, the video shows some members of the original lineup. On July 23, 2014, however, they shared a statement by Chris from the day before via their Facebook page, announcing a breakup and a farewell show in Covington, Kentucky set for September 20.

== Band members ==
Final lineup

- Joey Nelson – unclean vocals (2004–2008, 2009–2014)
- Jeff Nelson – guitars (2004–2008, 2009–2014)
- Nick Scarberry – bass, clean vocals (2004–2008, 2012–2014)
- Chris Profitt – guitar (2004–2007, 2012–2014)
- Brandon Sowder – drums, percussion (2004–2007, 2012–2014)

Former members

- Matt Jones – keytar (2004–2007)
- Kevin Stafford – guitars, clean vocals, keyboards (2007–2008, 2009–2011)
- Bryan Cash – drums (2008, 2009–2011)
- Finn – guitars, keyboards (2009–2011)
- Randy Barnes – bass (2009–2011)

Timeline

== Discography ==
=== Studio albums ===
Date of release	Title	Label	U.S Billboard Heatseekers peak	weeks on chart
January 23, 2007	What Demons Do to Saints	Victory Records	n/a	0
June 24, 2008	The Day the Music Died	Victory Records	28	2
May 11, 2010	In Loving Memory	Victory Records	31	1

=== EPs ===
Date of release	Title	Label
2005	Demo 2005 (demo)	none
May 13, 2006	More Than You Can Handle... (EP)	none
