= Sea of Treachery =

American metal and deathcore band

- Also known as: At Daggers Drawn
- Origin: Hebron, Kentucky, United States
- Genres: Melodic metalcore, deathcore, melodic death metal
- Years active: 2004–present
- Labels: Sumerian, BlkHeart Group
- Members: Alex Huffman; Cody Patton; Tyler Monell; Christian McManama; Aaron Hoover
- Past members: Chris Lawrence; Jonas Ladekjaer; Chris Paterson; Tommy Dalhover; Josh Trenkamp; Mike Dalhover; Cory Knight; Jon Wells; Kevin Butler; Voice Gajic; Drew Thomason
- Website: www.myspace.com/seaoftreachery

Sea of Treachery (formerly known as At Daggers Drawn) is an American metalcore/deathcore band from Hebron, Kentucky, United States, formed in 2004. Since forming, they have released three EPs and two full-length studio albums, the first being At Daggers Drawn, which was released on April 29, 2008, on Sumerian Records, and the second being Wonderland, released on December 14, 2010, on Blkheart Group. The digital version of Wonderland, featuring a bonus track, was released January 4, 2011. In early 2012, the band had reformed with the original line-up who were on the At Daggers Drawn record, played a reunion show in Newport, Kentucky, and have also announced more shows around the tri-state area.

== Musical style ==
The band showcases many forms of extreme metal in their overall delivery. On At Daggers Drawn, the songs contained elements from metalcore (breakdowns, screamed vocals, etc.), deathcore (blast beats, deep growls, highs, etc.), and post-hardcore (clean vocals, choruses, etc.). Wonderland showed even more musical progression, taking the elements from At Daggers Drawn and combining more technical guitar work and an overall technical song structure. The clean vocals on Wonderland also had more of a rougher, hard rock sound to it than the clean vocals on At Daggers Drawn.

== History ==
=== Formation, Sumerian Records, and At Daggers Drawn (2004–2008) ===
Their debut album, At Daggers Drawn, was released April 29, 2008. Prior to this, under the name At Daggers Drawn, the band had released an EP in 2006 entitled All Hope Is Lost and an 11 track CD entitled The First Eulogy. Many of the songs from The First Eulogy were re-released on At Daggers Drawn following a line-up change and subsequent signing to Sumerian Records. All of these early recordings were produced by Joey Sturgis in Connersville, Indiana. After several lineup changes, that included the return of original vocalist, Alex Huffman, the band relocated to San Diego, California. In September 2009, Sumerian dropped Sea of Treachery from the roster after the label had lost confidence in the band. The band began writing their second album while in Southern California.

=== BlkHeart Group and Wonderland (2008–2012) ===
On the June 15, 2009, the band released a demo of the song "Skin Deep" (featuring Johnny Plague of Winds of Plague) on their MySpace. This was followed by another upload of another song (titled "The Comedian Is Dead") on the June 27, 2009. Both of these songs were re-recorded and appear on Wonderland. The album version of "Skin Deep" does not feature Johnny Plague.

On October 7, 2010, the band announced that they had signed to BlkHeart Group and that their second album Wonderland would be released December 14, 2010. In November 2010, BlkHeart Group released the album art for Wonderland and on November 16, the band released the album's first single, "A Lifetime Ago". On December 3, 2010, the band released a second track from Wonderland, entitled "Who's Winning, You or You?" on their Facebook page.

=== Return of old line-up, new EP (2012–present) ===
It was announced on March 17, 2012, that the original Sea of Treachery lineup had re-formed to write new music and tour.

In April 2012, Sea of Treachery was declared unsigned once again due to BlkHeart Group closing its doors.

Shortly before the band's scheduled headlining tour in December 2012, brothers Michael and Tommy Dalhover abruptly left the band, which forced the band to scramble to recruit new members. Without enough time to do so, the band was forced to cancel the tour but quickly added Cody Patton and Josh Wells to play drums and guitar, respectively. Both Patton and Wells played their first show with Sea of Treachery in March 2013.

They released a single, "Palindrome", on April 6, 2013, their first release since 2010's Wonderland. The band embarked on their first tour of 2013 in late May.

Currently, the band is not touring, due to vocalist Alex Huffman having a tumor in his stomach, disabling him from performance duties as a frontman.

== Members ==
Current

- Alex Huffman – lead vocals (2004–present)
- Christian McManama – lead guitar (2012–present)
- Cody Patton – drums (2013–present)
- Aaron Hoover – rhythm guitar (2019–present)
- Tyler Monell – bass, clean vocals (2019–present)

Former

- Josh Trenkamp – vocals (2008, never recorded with band)
- Jordan Reinhart – lead guitar (2004–2005)
- Jonas Ladekjaer – lead guitar, clean vocals, keyboards, programming (2005–2008)
- Voice Gajic – lead guitar (2009–2010)
- Cory Knight – rhythm guitar (2004–2008, 2012)
- Mike Dalhover – rhythm guitar (2007–2008, 2012)
- Chris Simmons – rhythm guitar (2009–2010)
- Jon Wells – rhythm guitar (2013)
- Drew Thomason – rhythm guitar (2013–2015)
- Chris Lawrence – rhythm guitar (2016–2018)
- Corey Howell – bass guitar (2004–2007)
- Justin Lewis – bass guitar (2005)
- Kevin Butler – bass guitar, clean vocals (2009)
- Chris Paterson – bass guitar, clean vocals, programming, keyboard (2009–2013)
- Nathan Blasdell – bass guitar (2014–2019)
- Cory Baker – drums (2004–2007)
- Tommy Dalhover – drums (2007–2008, 2012)
- Adam Pierce – drums (2009–2010)
- Jake Green – drums (2010–2011)

== Discography ==
=== Studio albums ===
- The First Eulogy (As At Daggers Drawn) (2006)
- At Daggers Drawn (2008)
- Wonderland (2010)

=== EPs ===
- Black Hearts and Burial Shrouds (2005)
- All Hope is Lost (2006)
- Album Demos (2006)
- "Demo 2007" (2007)

=== Singles ===
- "Misery Business" (Paramore Cover) (2008)
- "Purging of the Wicked" (2008)
- "Skin Deep (Feat Johnny Plague of Winds Of Plague) [Demo]" (2009)
- "The Comedian is Dead [Demo]" (2009)
- "A Lifetime Ago" (2011)
- "Who's Winning You or You" (2011)
- "Palindrome" (2013)
- "Hell on Earth" (2019)
- "Echo" (2019)
- "Deathproof" (2023)
- "What's Past is Prologue" (2024)
- "FEARBOMB" (2024)
