= Requiem – Fortissimo =

Studio album by Virgin Black
- Released: February 19, 2008
- Length: 43:53
- Label: The End Records; Massacre Records
- Producer: Rowan London, Samantha Escarbe

Virgin Black chronology
| Requiem - Mezzo Forte (2007) | Requiem – Fortissimo (2008) | Requiem - Pianissimo (2018) |

Professional ratings
Review scores
| Source | Rating |
|---|---|
| Chronicles of Chaos | 8/10 link |
| Exclaim! | link |
| Metal Storm | 92/100 link |
| Metal Sucks | 4/5 link |
| Rockfreaks.net | 5^{1/2}/10 link |
| Sputnikmusic | link |

Requiem – Fortissimo is the third part of Virgin Black's Requiem album trilogy and its second installment since Requiem - Mezzo Forte. The album was released on February 19, 2008. Metal Storm voted Requiem - Fortissimo as The Best Doom Metal Album of 2008.

== Recording ==
Vocalist-keyboardist Rowan London has stated about the album:

I should feel a sense of dread offering up something so atypical for us to be interrogated and scrutinized. But the fearlessness that we inhabited while writing Fortissimo and the Requiem series survives to see its unveiling. An album not so much about death as the absence of life; it's damn heavy but its countenance is far more brutal than its sound could ever be. Long live the "death choir".

== Track listing ==
1. "The Fragile Breath" - 5:49
2. "In Winters Ash" - 7:23
3. "Silent" - 6:42
4. "God in Dust" - 8:39
5. "Lacrimosa (Gather Me)" - 2:21
6. "Darkness" - 11:45
7. "Forever" - 1:14
