= Exit Ten =

English band

- Origin: Reading, Berkshire, England
- Genres: Post-hardcore; alternative rock; alternative metal; progressive metal
- Years active: 2003–2014
- Labels: Deep Burn
- Past members: James Steele; Stuart Steele; Chris Steele; Joe Ward; Ryan Redman
- Website: www.exitten.net

Exit Ten was an English post-hardcore/rock band with metal influences. Their debut album, Remember the Day, was released in 2008. Their second studio album, Give Me Infinity, was released in October 2011.

== Biography ==
Exit Ten are a post-hardcore and alternative band with post-metal influences from Reading, Berkshire, England. Their influences are as diverse as Killswitch Engage, In Flames, Tool, Deftones, Muse, Radiohead and Jeff Buckley.

The band was originally conceived as a four-piece composed of twins Stuart and James 'Jza' Steele, their older brother Chris and the family's lifelong friend Joe Ward. After playing as a more traditional metalcore band, the current line up came together in 2003 with the addition of more melodic vocalist Ryan Redman. Redman had until that point been singing for indie-funk band Ant Salon.

2004 was the year the band, while still teenagers, began to pick up international recognition. April saw them record their début self-titled EP with Mark Williams (Sikth, Oceansize, yourcodenameis:milo).

In summer 2004, the band was involved in an American TV show, Richard Branson: Rebel Billionaire. Aired globally, Exit Ten were picked from 15 other acts during the show which eventually led to them playing on the NME stage at the UK's V Festival.

This World They'll Drown, produced by Andy Sneap, was released through Deep Burn Records only in the UK on 12 June 2006. On the weekend of the release the band played the Gibson Guitars stage at Download Festival 2006.

In the first quarter of 2007, Exit Ten spent a week with Justin Hill and Dan Weller (Sikth/WellerHill Productions) demoing new material. In April 2007, two of these demos – Piece by Piece by Piece and Perish in the Flames – appeared on the band's MySpace page to stream in their entirety, to coincide with the band's début headline tour of the UK (dubbed 'The Great Rebellion Tour 2007').

In 2008, the band released début album Remember the Day, recorded with Mark Williams, through Pinnacle imprint Deep Burn Records, spawning two videos – 'Technically Alive' and 'Warriors' (also a single). That year the band appeared at the UK's Download Festival and toured with 36 Crazyfists.

On 3 December 2008, Pinnacle Entertainment Ltd announced that it was going in to administration so effectively all activities as a record label and distributor of music ceased. Exit Ten's label Deep Burn was signed to Pinnacle, so the initial disaster for the band was that as stocks of their album Remember the Day and EP This World They'll Drown ran out, they would not be replenished whilst the album remained the property of the label's administrators.

Exit Ten finally recorded their second studio album in Reading, at Outhouse Studios (Enter Shikari, You Me at Six, Funeral for a Friend) in 2010. On 4 July 2011 a track from the album, "Curtain Call", was made available to stream from the Jägermeister UK Facebook page. On Wednesday 20 July, Exit Ten revealed, via www.rocksound.tv, that their upcoming album would be called Give Me Infinity. The artwork and track listing for the album were also made known. On 25 August 2011, the band announced, via their Facebook page, that the album release would be delayed until 10 October 2011, to coincide with their touring schedule. Give Me Infinity was released on 10 October to a big reception. The second promo video, "Suggest a Path", following "Curtain Call", also coincided with the release. Kerrang! claimed with Give Me Infinity – "Exit Ten have officially arrived" 4k. While Metal Hammer called it "A beautiful and powerful work" 8/10. They garnered various radio plays and a positive critical reaction and began touring. In April 2012, the band headed out on a European run to coincide with the European release. The third single and promo video were for the track "Sunset". In February 2012, they supported Theory of a Deadman and in October 2012, they supported Shinedown on their European Tour.

The group disbanded in 2014.

Following the end of Exit Ten, Ryan Redman joined I Am Giant, with whom he appeared on The X-Factor New Zealand. He left the band in late 2015. As of 2017, Redman was frontman of London/Reading-based rock band Chekhov's Gun.

Chris Steele currently plays drums for Big Spring.

== Members ==
- Ryan Redman – vocals
- Stuart Steele – guitar, backing vocals
- Joe Ward – guitar
- James Steele – bass
- Chris Steele – drums

== Discography ==
=== Albums ===
- Remember the Day (2008)
- Give Me Infinity (2011)

=== EPs ===
- Exit Ten (2004)
- This World They'll Drown (2006)
- Sunset (2012)

=== Demos ===
- "RunningFrog Demo" (2005)

"Deny" and "Better Than You" (A Path to Take Demo)

- "Wellerhill Demo" (2007)

"Perish in the Flames", "Piece by Piece by Piece" and "Something to Say"

- "JM Demo" (2009)

"Lay Down", "Time Has Been Lost", "Universe"

- "EMI Studios Demo" (2010)

"Lion", "How Will We Tire", "Suggest a Path"
