= 4-Way Noise Explosion =

2008 grindcore compilation

Compilation album (Split album) by Long Suffering, Rehumanize, Corpse Under Construction, Eternal Mystery
- Released: April 22, 2008
- Genres: Christian metal; grindcore; deathgrind; death metal; goregrind; noisegrind
- Length: 57:20
- Languages: English, Spanish
- Label: Sewersound Records

4-Way Noise Explosion is a split album by four Christian grindcore artists, released on April 22, 2008, through Sewersound Records. The album contains tracks from the American projects Long Suffering, Rehumanize, and Eternal Mystery, and the Danish project Corpse Under Construction.

== Artists ==
Long Suffering was a one-man band from California, performed by Raymond Banda. Rehumanize consisted of Broc Toney of Louisiana-based Eternal Mystery and the Panamanian-American Phil Diez from the Rhode Island-based projects Sorrowstorm and Encryptor. Corpse Under Construction, a project from Denmark by Martin and David Svinth (the latter of the post-hardcore band Magtesløs) released no other material than that found on this split. Eternal Mystery was at this time a solo project by Broc Toney.

== Style and lyrics ==
Reviewer Jason McClaren described the style performed by Long Suffering on its quarter of the split as highly abrasive and caustic white noise. The vocals are screeches and rasps. The use of sound clips from sermons and testimony were considered by reviewer Lloyd Harp to be eerie with an almost other worldly effect. The instrumentation involves "ICE beat blasts" on a drum kit with no bass drum, extremely distorted single-note riffs, and similarly distorted gargling screams. The production value is very high-pitched. Rehumanize was described both as goregrind and classic grindcore with more guttural vocals. The drumming is programmed; in the case of "Prayer Unto Holiness", a jazzy pattern is used. The riffs are low, incorporating punk and death metal influences. McLaren considered the style a punkier take on the deathgrind sound of Phil Diaz's Encryptor. Vocals are very low-pitched, Diaz's low growls contrasting with Broc Toney's distorted, even lower-end vocalizations on the songs. Production on the Rehumanize tracks is bass-heavy. The lyrics of Rehumanize focus on corruption in American Christian churches, televangelists, heresies, hypocrisy, and secularism. Corpse Under Construction performs minimalist noisegrind, eschewing guitar and bass and instead utilizing only screeching, ultra-distorted vocals, a drum machine, and electronic noise. The vocals involve grunts, screams, roars, and squeals. McLaren called the project "the very definition of anti-music." Eternal Mystery is of similar style to Rehumanize in the music and production styles, but is more death metal-oriented, groovier in the riffing, and less experimental with the drum machine. The Eternal Mystery songs also make extensive use of spoken word sampling from sermons and news broadcasts. The lyrics are of the same focus as those of Rehumanize.

== Reception ==
Lloyd Harp of Heaven's Metal noted that the split was released amidst a then-recent underground "insurgence" of Christian grind bands. He found the songs by Corpse Under Construction to be more interesting than might be thought given the minimalist approach. On February 4, 2022, he highlighted "Worms of the Underground" for Indie Vision Music's "Song of the Day", praising the group for its entertainment and creativity. Regarding Eternal Mystery, Harp found the use of sampling to be excessive, not leaving much space for the actual music.

Tobias Audersch of the German youth ministry Crossover AGM had a mixed opinion of the split. He considered Long Suffering to be interesting in the short span of its songs, especially because of the drumming. He likewise enjoyed the Eternal Mystery side of the album, considering it more entertaining than Rehumanize. He appreciated the variety of the audio samples, though stated that the listener may or may not agree with the reactionary sentiment of the samples. Audersch was less appreciative of Rehumanize, considering the project among the kind he finds completely uninteresting. He felt the attempts at variety in the tempo changes to be trying too hard. For instance, the more jazz style programming on "Prayer Unto Holiness" does not work, in Audersch's opinion. He was harshly critical of Corpse Under Construction, finding the group infuriating, with no songs or talent, just "pure noise". He quipped that the duo, and the other artists on the release, were sure to provoke a wave of individuals leaving the Church. He concluded regarding the Corpse Under Construction side: "I don't know what else to say. I think it's crap." He summarized overall that the split was not particularly special but saved by the Long Suffering and Eternal Mystery sides.

Retrospectively, Jason McLaren of Heaven's Metal in 2025 opined that the album is a definitive classic among Christian grindcore split albums, and that the split "stands out above all the rest in its variety, quality and overall consistency". In a full retrospective review of the split, he called the recording an essential for understanding Christian grindcore and a "long-lost cult classic" that is now legendary due to its content and the scarcity of physical copies. Rehumanize he labeled "ineffable"; Long Suffering produced some of the most intense grind he has ever listened to. Corpse Under Construction he stated is perhaps the most extreme Christian band in existence, with music "so ridiculous, so absurd, so absolutely ludicrous that I can’t help but laugh." Per McLaren, some hate the group, others love it, and for him it is a "strange bit of abstract anti-art, the last entrails of grind’s ethos and purpose reduced to the point where there’s nothing left but primal noise." Regarding Eternal Mystery, McLaren opined that, while he never understood why the project was as revered as it was in the Christian grindcore scene, on 4-Way Noise Explosion he felt that the material is "light years beyond the band’s other stuff, actually sounding much more full-fleshed."

== Track listing ==
Long Suffering

All tracks are written by Raymond Banda.

| No. | Title | Length |
|---|---|---|
| 1. | "Sing to the Lord" | 1:57 |
| 2. | "Mother Ruth" | 0:57 |
| 3. | "Ancient of Days" | 0:46 |
| 4. | "Give it to the Lord" | 1:15 |
| 5. | "1 Corinthians 15" | 3:04 |
| 6. | "Steadfast" | 0:36 |
| 7. | "Great is the Lord" | 0:40 |
| 8. | "You Your Trespasses" | 1:14 |

Rehumanize

All tracks are written by Broc Toney and Phil Diez except for "Hammering Satan's Head".

| No. | Title | Writer(s) | Length |
|---|---|---|---|
| 9. | "He Ate With Sinners" | | 1:05 |
| 10. | "ACLU - Shame on You" | | 0:38 |
| 11. | "Godless Culture" | | 1:17 |
| 12. | "Experiencia Sobrenatural" | | 1:42 |
| 13. | "Lukewarm and Getting Colder" | | 2:10 |
| 14. | "Televandalism" | | 1:07 |
| 15. | "Dirty Business Epidemic" | | 1:50 |
| 16. | "Prayer Unto Holiness" | | 1:49 |
| 17. | "Enfermedad Grave" | | 0:50 |
| 18. | "Seasons at the Ward" | | 1:22 |
| 19. | "Contra Ti, Satan" | | 1:34 |
| 20. | "Critically Ill" | | 0:31 |
| 21. | "For Cross and Judgement" | | 1:20 |
| 22. | "Joel Osteen's Heresy" | | 0:50 |
| 23. | "Aborrecidos Por Su Nombre" | | 0:55 |
| 24. | "God or Nothing" | | 0:35 |
| 25. | "Greed in the Flesh" | | 1:00 |
| 26. | "What May Await You" | | 0:41 |
| 27. | "Radio Unfriendly" | | 0:35 |
| 28. | "Hammering Satan's Head" (Vomitorial Corpulence cover (in Spanish)) | Vomitorial Corpulence | 0:42 |

Corpse Under Construction

All tracks are written by Martin and David Svinth.

| No. | Title | Length |
|---|---|---|
| 29. | "Definitely not Human" | 0:46 |
| 30. | "A Foretaste of" | 0:55 |
| 31. | "Anacondachrist" | 0:12 |
| 32. | "Worms of the Underground" | 0:44 |
| 33. | "Bag of Sweets" | 0:21 |
| 34. | "Unnatural Order" | 0:26 |
| 35. | "Flaming Bonfire" | 0:55 |
| 36. | "Suffering on My Feet" | 0:41 |
| 37. | "Gore Party" | 0:43 |
| 38. | "Blasting World of Temptations" | 0:55 |
| 39. | "Why is He Laughing?" | 0:52 |
| 40. | "Hanging on Hooks" | 0:36 |
| 41. | "More than Musick" | 0:53 |
| 42. | "Esajas" | 1:21 |

Eternal Mystery

All tracks are written by Broc Toney.

| No. | Title | Length |
|---|---|---|
| 43. | "Intro" | 0:55 |
| 44. | "A Taste of What is to Come" | 0:26 |
| 45. | "Crushed" | 2:18 |
| 46. | "Insanity Plea" | 1:08 |
| 47. | "Infanticide" | 0:35 |
| 48. | "Pseudo-Christianity Pt. 1" | 1:50 |
| 49. | "Pseudo-Christianity Pt. 2" | 1:34 |
| 50. | "USA (United States of Absurdity)" | 1:38 |
| 51. | "The Actor" | 1:44 |
| 52. | "The New Face of Communism Pt. 1" | 1:05 |
| 53. | "The New Face of Communism Pt. 2" | 0:45 |
| Total length: | | 57:20 |

== Personnel ==
- Ray Banda - tracks 1-8: all vocals and instrumentation
- Broc Toney - tracks 9-28: vocals, all instrumentation and programming; tracks 43-53: all vocals, instrumentation, and programming
- Phil Diez - tracks 9-28: vocals
- Martin Svinth - tracks 29-42: vocals, noise
- David Svinth - tracks 29-42: vocals, programming
