= At Daggers Drawn (album) =

Studio album by Sea of Treachery
- Released: April 29, 2008
- Recorded: 2006–2007
- Studio: Foundation Recording Studios, Connersville
- Genre: Metalcore, deathcore, melodic death metal
- Length: 42:36
- Label: Sumerian
- Producer: Joey Sturgis

Sea of Treachery chronology
At Daggers Drawn (2008)	Wonderland (2010)

Singles from At Daggers Drawn
- 1. "Purging of the Wicked" Released: June 20, 2008

Professional ratings
Review scores
Source	Rating
AllMusic	(positive)

At Daggers Drawn is the debut album by American metalcore band Sea of Treachery, released on April 29, 2008, through Sumerian Records. The title of the album comes from the band's old name, before breaking up, regrouping, and changing labels.

== Track listing ==
No.	Title	Length
1.	"The First Eulogy"	0:51
2.	"Purging of the Wicked"	4:42
3.	"Unleash the Serpents"	3:34
4.	"Endless Cycle of Torture"	3:26
5.	"Eyes of the Ranger"	3:57
6.	"On the Wings of Pegasus"	4:12
7.	"Raise the Banner"	3:03
8.	"Interlude"	1:43
9.	"Back to the Surface"	4:28
10.	"And the Angels were Silent"	5:05
11.	"I Never was a White Picket Fence Sorta Guy"	4:23
12.	"Their Own Hell"	3:13
Total length:		42:36

== Personnel ==
Sea of Treachery

- Alex Huffman – unclean vocals
- Jonas Ladekjaer – lead guitar, keyboards, programming, clean vocals
- Cory Knight – guitars
- Jon Wells – bass, backing vocals
- Tommy Dalhover – drums, backing vocals

Additional musicians

- Mike Dalhover – vocals, guitars, programming
- Cory Baker – drums
- Corey Howell – bass, backing vocals
- Joey Sturgis – keys, engineer, mixer
- Qbert R. Seiter – sousaphone, harmonica, ocarina
