= The Day the Music Died (album) =

Studio album by Beneath the Sky
- Released: June 24, 2008
- Recorded: Cleveland, Ohio
- Genres: Metalcore, deathcore
- Length: 60:21
- Label: Victory
- Producers: Don Debiase; Brandon Youngs

Beneath the Sky chronology
What Demons Do to Saints (2007)	The Day the Music Died (2008)	In Loving Memory (2010)

Professional ratings
Review scores
Source	Rating
AbsolutePunk.net	69%
SmartPunk.com	4.5/5 stars
Thrash Magazine	8.8/10

The Day the Music Died is the second studio album by Beneath the Sky, released on June 24, 2008.

== Track listing ==
No.	Title	Length
1.	"Nature of the Beast"	5:19
2.	"True Friends Stab You in the Front"	3:22
3.	"With a Gun Smoke Kiss"	4:54
4.	"Misery With a Delicate Voice"	5:36
5.	"Option for the Lonely"	3:57
6.	"The Belle of the Ball"	9:40
7.	"It All Ends With a Smile"	4:56
8.	"I'll Call This My Own"	4:38
9.	"Respect for the Dead"	5:37
10.	"Another Day"	4:56
11.	"The Pursuit of ???"	3:53
Total length:		60:21

== Personnel ==
- Joey Nelson – lead vocals
- Jeff Nelson – guitar
- Kevin Stafford – guitar
- Nick Scarberry – bass, vocals
- Bryan Cash – drums
