= Quito Ultratumba nightclub fire =

2008 fire in Ecuador

Factory nightclub fire
- Date: April 19, 2008
- Time: 4:30 PM (ECT)
- Location: Factory nightclub, Quito, Ecuador; 0°15′40″S 78°31′25″W
- Cause: Pyrotechnics accident
- Deaths: 19
- Injuries: 24+ (Note: Some news reports state at least 24 injured, others state over 35 injured)

The Quito Ultratumba nightclub fire was a fire that occurred on April 19, 2008, at the Factory nightclub in Quito, Ecuador, during the gothic rock concert Ultratumba 2008. A pyrotechnics accident during the show by Vendimia ignited a fire leading to the entire building burning. Of the over 300 people present, between both musicians and attendees, nineteen were killed with at least twenty-four injured. Among the deceased were five of the seven members of the gothic rock band Zelestial, which was scheduled to be honored at the event.

== Incident ==
The fire began at approximately 4:30 p.m. ECT (UTC−05:00) during the performance from the band Vendimia. The pyrotechnics show from the band included Patricio Nogales firebreathing into a mesh containing lettering with the band's name. The climax of the show was set to involve four fireworks and flares set off simultaneously. At 4:30, during the fifth song performance from the band, Vendimia's singer, Patricio Lestat, ordered the stage crew to launch the flares. The sparks from the flares struck the ceiling, leading to some of them igniting portions of foam. The ceiling was then engulfed in flames while portions of the burning foam began landing on the audience. The stage fabrics and decorations were then ignited by the flames. There was only one door in and out of the building due to the emergency exit being locked, which lead to a human crush as audience members and musicians tried to escape. A metal ring inside the venue, blocking the center pathway, also hindered escape. Some of those who escaped, along with firefighters, broke a hole into a wall through which they managed to extricate two people from the building. Other individuals escaped through the bathrooms of the venue after breaking through the cement and brick walls.

== Casualties ==
Nineteen people were killed due to the fire, including five who died from their injuries at the hospital. Five of the seven members of the band Zelestial died: bassist Andrés Rivadeneira, vocalists Claudia Noboa and Mauricio Machado, guitarist Pablo Bernal, and coordinator Paola Fletcher. Guitarist Daniel Calderón and drummer Andrés Cárdenas survived. José Barragán, sole member of the grindcore project Flactorophia, was also killed. At least an additional twenty-four, if not thirty-five, individuals were injured.

== Investigation and aftermath ==
The day following the fire, Paco Moncayo, mayor of Quito, decreed three days of mourning, and tendered his resignation; which the local city council rejected. President Rafael Correa made a floral offering and urged that such accidents not be repeated. On April 27, a fundraising concert to benefit the family and friends of the victims was held in the city, which was attended by 10,056 people. Bands from throughout Ecuador performed at the event, along with Obituary from Florida; Obituary had originally been scheduled to perform at the Factory that date and performed at the fundraiser at cost only for lodging and travel expenses.

Public outcry was directed at the venue promoters, security personnel, the administrator of the south zone of the city, Jorge Velásquez, the municipality councilor, and the president of the board of directors of the fire department. The mayor and deputy mayor were also blamed for a larger issue of marginalizing public youth activities and events and denying them public permits. Years of public media debate followed, discussing causes of the fire, the individuals responsible, rock music, "gothic Satanism", and the alleged irresponsibility of the rock artists.

Investigation into the disaster revealed inconsistencies in the legality of the building's operation as an entertainment venue. The permit from the fire department expired on December 2007, yet Factory was still in operation up to the day of the disaster the following April. Factory was also registered with the municipality as functioning for a year, but according to two locals of the area, the nightclub had been operating for two years. Police and civil defense presence were both also legally required for an event such as Ultratumba 2008; and while police were present, they allowed the event to proceed despite an expired permit. A six month long independent investigation found multiple failure points and discrepancies. Due to its proximity to three educational centers, the business had been denied a land use permit, but the owner, Paul Jauregui, convinced the commission to grant the permit anyway. Due to continuing noise complaints, the venue stuffed the ceiling with mattresses. The fire department allowed the venue to continue operating despite the addition of flammable material, despite there being fewer entrances and exits than legally required for the venue's capacity, and despite the lack of a firefighting pipe connected to the water main. The metal ring which had impeded the escape of many attendants was installed for a planned female mud-wrestling event later in the evening of April 19 and was done so without knowledge of the fire department.

The city offered reparations to surviving victims and family members of the deceased, but after six months began insisting that claimants sign a document absolving the city of any responsibility for the disaster. Seven years later, only two individuals were convicted – Patricia C., organizer of the event, and Gabriel R., the individual who allegedly lit the flare which sparked the conflagration – despite some twenty-five initially being accused. The two convicted individuals had their sentences reduced to two years; they continued to contest their sentencing and by 2011 the two years had passed without either serving time. Ernesto Machado, the brother of the deceased Mauricio Machado, claimed that municipal authorities, the fire department, and the police office were among the accused. Ten years after the incident, lawsuits were still pending.

In 2013, the Regional Foundation for Human Rights Advice (INREDH) published the Report of the Regional Foundation for Human Rights Advice on the Factory case. A survivor of the fire, Marcelo Negrete Morales, who lost two friends to the incident, co-authored the report. According to Vice, the report was one of the most detailed documentations of an incident of this kind for Latin America. According to the report, the incident highlighted the marginalization and exclusion of the youth scene of which the concert was part. Pedro Subía, who lost his son Diego Subia to the incident, was motivated to become an activist. In 2016, a park memorializing the victims of the fire, Parque de las Diversidades (Park of Diversities) was opened to the public.
