= Are You Serious? (Dead to Fall album) =

Are You Serious

Studio album by Dead to Fall
- Released: February 19, 2008
- Recorded: 2007–2008
- Genre: Metalcore
- Length: 39:48
- Label: Victory
- Producer: Mike Schleibaum

Dead to Fall chronology
| The Phoenix Throne (2006) | Are You Serious (2008) |

Professional ratings
Review scores
| Source | Rating |
|---|---|
| allmusic | (Not Rated) |

Are You Serious? is the fourth and final full-length release from Chicago-based metalcore band Dead to Fall. It was leaked in early February 2008. It is the band's only studio album with rhythm guitarist Phil Merriman.

== Track listing ==
- All songs written by Dead to Fall
1. "IQ Test" - 0:59
2. "Stupid?" - 2:22
3. "The Future" - 4:19
4. "Sleeping Bag" - 3:18
5. "Major Rager" - 3:11
6. "Loch Ness" - 5:08
7. "Brainmelter" - 4:08
8. "Cropgrower" - 4:12
9. "Robo-Destro" - 3:07
10. "Doombox" - 3:02
11. "Astral Projection / Dream J(ourney)" - 5:32

== Song information ==
- "Stupid?" is a sarcastic take on what the band should be doing at this point in their career, and the music scene they are involved with.
- "Sleeping Bag" is about the band's touring van which is still barely functioning.
- The lyrics to "Brainmelter" were written by bassist Chad Fjerstad and are heavily influenced by Ken Russell's 1980 film Altered States.
- "Cropgrower" was influenced by Jonathan Hunt's time working in the corn fields in Iowa.
- "Doombox" is about the female sex organ and the women who use, abuse, and manipulate men with its powers.

== Personnel ==
=== Dead to Fall ===
- Jonathan Hunt: Vocals
- Logan Kelly: Lead guitar
- Phil Merriman: Rhythm guitar, Narration on "IQ Test"
- Chad Fjerstad: Bass
- Timothy Java: Drums

=== Additional musicians ===
- Arthur Harrison: Theremin

== Production ==
- Arranged By Dead To Fall
- Produced By Mike Schleibaum
- Recorded, Engineered & Mixed By Brian McTernan
- Assistant Recording Engineer: Phil Merriman
- Digital Editing: Paul Leavitt
- Mastered By UE Nastasi
