= 2009 in heavy metal music =

This is a timeline documenting the events of heavy metal in the year 2009.

== Reformed bands ==
- Accept
- Arcturus
- Ark
- Autopsy
- Beherit
- Beneath the Sky
- Creed
- The Crown
- Decapitated
- Faith No More
- Gorguts
- Saint Vitus (few shows only)
- Steel Attack
- To/Die/For
- Unanimated
- Year of Desolation

== Disbandments ==
- After Forever
- Angelcorpse
- Animosity
- Battle of Mice
- Burnt by the Sun
- Burst
- Divinity Destroyed
- Falchion
- God Seed
- Gorefest
- Grief
- Lock Up
- Lord Belial
- Metal Church
- Nothingface
- The Old Dead Tree
- Opiate for the Masses
- Running Wild
- Subzero
- To/Die/For
- Twilightning
- xDEATHSTARx

== Events ==
- Iron Maiden complete their globe-trotting Somewhere Back in Time World Tour, playing 90 shows in 38 countries.
- Iron Maiden become the first heavy metal band to win a Brit Award, winning the Best Live Act at the awards ceremony.
- Former Arsis guitarist Ryan Knight joins The Black Dahlia Murder in late January, replacing John Kempainen.
- Guitarist Doug Weber leaves Terror in January and is replaced by former No Warning guitarist Jordan Posner.
- Metallica is inducted into the Rock and Roll Hall of Fame on 4 April.
- Metallica's 2008 album Death Magnetic is nominated for four Grammy categories, winning Best Recording Package and Best Metal Performance for "My Apocalypse".
- Cannibal Corpse wins "Greatest Death Metal Song" with "Hammer Smashed Face" in a poll on the Metal Hammer website. Arch Enemy places second with "We Will Rise", Death third with "Crystal Mountain".
- Finnish metal band Norther parts ways with longtime singer/guitarist Petri Lindroos and announces Aleksi Sihvonen (Medicated, ex-Imperanon) as the replacement vocalist.
- Varg Vikernes is released from prison after 16 years of incarceration for the murder of Øystein Aarseth (aka Euronymous).
- The Gorgoroth name dispute concludes with a court verdict recognising Gorgoroth founding member Infernus as the legitimate user of the band name. Contestants Gaahl and King ov Hell form God Seed, but Gaahl retires from metal within a few months and King forms Ov Hell with Shagrath.
- Susperia vocalist Athera suffers a heart attack, and is diagnosed with a rare genetic disorder that requires a triple heart bypass. Athera successfully undergoes open heart surgery at Rikshospitalet University Hospital in Oslo on 16 March 2009.
- Dimmu Borgir's Dariusz "Daray" Brzozowski ranks No. 1 drummer in Poland's "Top Drummer" magazine.
- Shadows Fall announces the formation of its own label in conjunction with Warner Music Group's Independent Label Group and Ferret Music.
- Sonic Syndicate vocalist Roland Johansson quits the band.
- Original Arsis drummer Michael VanDyne returns to the band full-time.
- God Forbid confirms the departure of rhythm guitarist Dallas Coyle and announces former Darkest Hour guitarist Kris Norris as his replacement.
- Former Sentenced guitarist Miika Tenkula is found dead in his home from a heart attack due to a genetic condition. His overall health was presumably worsened by his heavy drinking problem.
- Satyricon bassist Victor Brandt quits the band in April.
- Venom drummer Antton leaves the band to focus on his other musical projects.
- Megadeth and Slayer co-headline "Canadian Carnage" with Machine Head and Suicide Silence.
- Alexi Laiho of Children of Bodom breaks arm on tour.
- Rigor Mortis guitarist Mike Scaccia is set to undergo emergency neck surgery. The MRI scan noticed Scaccia has a Cervical Herniated Disc in his lower neck, which could make him paralyzed without immediate surgery.
- Dead to Fall announces farewell show.
- Carpathian Forest guitarist/bassist Tchort leaves the band in May.
- Kataklysm guitarist Jean-Francois Dagenais is detained and arrested under the presumption of being on the FBI international most wanted list.
- Every Time I Die parts ways with drummer Mike "Ratboy" Novak, who had been with the band for 11 years.
- Deep Purple are issued a fine in Russia for "illegally" playing their own songs in Rostov-on-Don in October 2008.
- Brainstorm sign with AFM Records.
- Founding member and original Crimson Glory frontman Midnight dies on 8 July 2009.
- Jørn Lande returns to Masterplan.
- Megadeth frontman Dave Mustaine undergoes neck surgery.
- The Bled signs to Rise Records.
- Before There Was Rosalyn and Wrench in the Works at the Cornerstone Festival.
- Sonic Syndicate announces new vocalist Nathan James Biggs.
- ICS Vortex and Mustis leaves Dimmu Borgir.
- Destruction guitarist Mike Sifringer breaks his ring finger in Belgium.
- Former 3 Inches of Blood bassist Brian Redman dies on Saturday 27 September in a car crash near his home in Tacoma, Washington.
- Evile bassist Mike Alexander falls ill and dies at the age of 32 on 5 October in Luleå, Sweden.
- In a partnership between Earache Records and RapidShare, Irish thrash metal band Gama Bomb makes its third studio album, Tales from the Grave in Space, available for free download on 5 November 2009.
- Steven Tyler is laid off from Aerosmith on 14 November 2009. The lay-off was due to multiple factors, namely redundancies in the singing-songwriting division and rising rehab fees that have cost the group millions.
- Mercenary parts ways with drummer Mike Park, vocalist Mikke Sandager and keyboardist Morten Sandager.
- Former Death and Control Denied guitarist Shannon Hamm suffers a heart attack at home on 1 October.
- Ronnie James Dio is diagnosed with stomach cancer and is being treated at the Mayo Clinic.
- The Rev, drummer of Avenged Sevenfold, is found dead at his home in Huntington Beach on 28 December.

== Books ==
- ECW Press released a book looking at the work of producer Rick Rubin, entitled Rick Rubin: In the Studio, written by biographer Jake Brown on 11 August.
- Former Stratovarius member Timo Tolkki published his autobiography, Hymn to Life – Entr'acte, on 2 November, through Goldenworks Ltd./Blacksmith Ltd.
- At the End of the Day, a book charting the career of Blaze Bayley, was released on 25 September.
- All That Matters, a Metallica biography written by Paul Stenning, was released in October via Plexus Publishing.
- Led Zeppelin: Good Times, Bad Times: A Visual Biography, a book examining the public and private lives of the members of Led Zeppelin, was released on 1 October, via Abrams Publishing.
- Rock photographer Neil Zlozower releases Mötley Crüe: A Visual History, 1983–2005 via Chronicle Books.
- A limited-edition book, Vintage Kiss Photos: 1974–1981, compiled by Marc Scallatino, was released, charting Kiss's early days.
- Cradle of Filth frontman Dani Filth and Gavin Baddeley release The Gospel of Filth, a book exploring the history of the band and more general topics of the dark side of humanity, on 31 October.
- New book announced on the history of metal titled Louder Than Hell: The Unflinching Oral History of Metal.
- Rudolf Schenker of the Scorpions released his autobiography, entitled Rock Your Life, in Germany on 14 October.
- Heavy metal magazine Decibel released Precious Metal: The Stories Behind 25 Extreme Metal Masterpieces in July. The book pays tribute to the 25 most influential extreme metal albums of all time. Some of the albums listed include Slayer's Reign in Blood, Cannibal Corpse's Tomb of the Mutilated, Converge's Jane Doe and Meshuggah's Destroy Erase Improve.
- All Pens Blazing, a heavy metal writer's handbook containing interviews and a history of heavy metal publications, is released on 16 August.
- Ozzy Osbourne released his autobiography, I Am Ozzy, on 1 October.
- Bazillion Points Books released Only Death Is Real: An Illustrated History of Hellhammer and Early Celtic Frost, a book exploring the bands Hellhammer and Celtic Frost written by band members Tom Fischer and Martin Eric Ain, in November 2009.
- Two books came from author Joel McIver, the first called The 100 Greatest Metal Guitarists with a foreword by Glen Benton of Deicide and the second titled To Live Is to Die: The Life and Death of Metallica's Cliff Burton, with a foreword by Kirk Hammett.

== Films ==
On 8 December, Bill Zebub will release Pagan Metal: A Documentary, the first documentary about pagan and folk metal.

== Albums released ==
=== January ===
Day	Artist	Album
5	Vreid	Milorg
6	Destroy Destroy Destroy	Battle Sluts
9	Bourbon Crow	Long Way to the Bottom
9	Grave Digger	Ballads of a Hangman
9	Iron Fire	To the Grave
13	Kreator	Hordes of Chaos
13	Saxon	Into the Labyrinth
20	Cattle Decapitation	The Harvest Floor
20	Rumpelstiltskin Grinder	Living for Death, Destroying the Rest
23	Sepultura	A-Lex
23	Napalm Death	Time Waits for No Slave
23	Sirenia	The 13th Floor
23	Vision Divine	9 Degrees West of the Moon
26	Architects	Hollow Crown
26	Dark Moor	Autumnal
26	Ephel Duath	Through My Dog's Eyes
30	Buckethead	Slaughterhouse on the Prairie
30	Deathstars	Night Electric Night

=== February ===
Day	Artist	Album
3	Cannibal Corpse	Evisceration Plague
3	This Ending	Dead Harvest
9	Adagio	Archangels in Black
10	Luna Mortis	The Absence
10	Red	Innocence & Instinct
16	God Forbid	Earthsblood
17	Psyopus	Odd Senses
17	Saros	Acrid Plains
17	Wolves in the Throne Room	Malevolent Grain (EP)
17	Obscura	Cosmogenesis
20	HammerFall	No Sacrifice, No Victory
20	Suidakra	Crógacht
23	Autumn	Altitude
23	Rotting Christ	Non Serviam — A 20 Year Apocryphal Story (live DVD/CD)
23	The Agonist	Lullabies for the Dormant Mind
23	Wolf	Ravenous
24	Absu	Absu
24	August Burns Red	Lost Messengers: The Outtakes (EP)
24	Lamb of God	Wrath
25	Impellitteri	Wicked Maiden
27	Arch Enemy	Manifesto of Arch Enemy (compilation)
27	The Burning	Rewakening
27	Isole	Silent Ruins
27	Lunatica	New Shores
27	Malefice	Dawn of Reprisal
27	The Sorrow	Origin of the Storm

=== March ===
Day	Artist	Album
2	Solitude Aeturnus	Hour of Despair
3	Buried Inside	Spoils of Failure
6	Nightwish	Made in Hong Kong (And in Various Other Places) (live CD/DVD)
6	Samael	Above
9	The Haunted	Warning Shots (compilation)
10	Dope	No Regrets
10	Fortaleza (MX)	Una Luz Entre Las Sombras
10	The Number Twelve Looks Like You	Worse Than Alone
10	Red Fang	Red Fang
10	Yngwie Malmsteen	Angels of Love
11	Dark The Suns	All Ends in Silence
13	Domain	The Chronicles of Love, Hate and Sorrow
15	Thanatos	Justified Genocide
16	Pestilence	Resurrection Macabre
17	Believer	Gabriel
17	Kylesa	Static Tensions
17	Static-X	Cult of Static
20	Agathodaimon	Phoenix
20	Black Messiah	First War of the World
20	Ektomorf	What Doesn't Kill Me...
20	Delain	April Rain
23	My Dying Bride	For Lies I Sire
23	Revolution Renaissance	Age of Aquarius
24	Mastodon	Crack the Skye
25	Fairyland	Score to a New Beginning
25	Raven	Walk Through Fire
27	Candlemass	Death Magic Doom
30	Hatesphere	To The Nines
31	Impending Doom	The Serpent Servant
31	Queensrÿche	American Soldier
31	Wolves in the Throne Room	Black Cascade

=== April ===
Day	Artist	Album
3	Success Will Write Apocalypse Across the Sky	The Grand Partition and the Abrogation of Idolatry
6	Cauldron	Chained to the Nite
6	Code	Resplendent Grotesque
7	The Color of Violence	Youthanize
7	Ignominious Incarceration	Of Winter Born
9	Beherit	Engram
10	Eluveitie	Evocation I - The Arcane Dominion
14	Agoraphobic Nosebleed	Agorapocalypse
14	Brutal Truth	Evolution Through Revolution
14	Karl Sanders	Saurian Exorcisms
15	Ajattara	Noitumaa
15	Rudra	Brahmavidya: Transcendental I
15	Soilent Green	Inevitable Collapse in the Presence of Conviction
16	Emperor	Live Inferno (live CD/DVD)
17	Death Angel	Sonic German Beatdown – Live in Germany (live album)
17	Disbelief	Protected Hell
17	Endstille	Verführer
17	Maroon	Order
19	Mastercastle	The Phoenix
20	Earth Crisis	To the Death
20	Hacride	Lazarus
20	Lacuna Coil	Shallow Life
21	Black Label Society	Skullage (compilation/DVD)
21	Bloodbound	Tabula Rasa
21	Chimaira	The Infection
21	Dååth	The Concealers
22	National Napalm Syndicate	Devolution of Species
24	God Dethroned	Passiondale
24	Powerwolf	Bible of the Beast
24	Wolfchant	Determined Damnation
27	Blood Tsunami	Grand Feast for Vultures
27	Heaven and Hell	The Devil You Know
27	Nadja	When I See the Sun Always Shines on TV (cover album)
27	OSI	Blood
28	Animals as Leaders	Animals as Leaders
29	Impiety	Terroreign (Apocalyptic Armageddon Command)
29	Jungle Rot	What Horrors Await

=== May ===
Day	Artist	Album
1	Buckethead	A Real Diamond in the Rough
4	Edenbridge	LiveEarthDream
4	The Gathering	The West Pole
5	The Chariot	Wars and Rumors of Wars
5	The Devil Wears Prada	With Roots Above and Branches Below
5	Hatebreed	For the Lions (cover album)
5	Isis	Wavering Radiant
5	Nachtmystium	Doomsday Derelicts (EP)
5	Necrodeath	Phylogensis
5	Zao	AWAKE?
6	Obliterate	Something Wrong
8	Epica	The Classical Conspiracy (live album)
8	Lacrimosa	Sehnsucht
8	Slough Feg	Ape Uprising!
9	Lacrimae (MX)	White Pest
11	Devils Whorehouse	Blood & Ashes
11	Nattefrost	Engangsgrill
11	Vomitory	Carnage Euphoria
12	Sacred Oath	Sacred Oath
12	The Black Dahlia Murder	Majesty (DVD)
13	Spiritus Mortis	The God Behind The God
15	Tim "Ripper" Owens	Play My Game
18	Old Man's Child	Slaves of the World
18	Stratovarius	Polaris
18	Sunn O)))	Monoliths and Dimensions
18	Susperia	Attitude
19	Warbringer	Waking into Nightmares
20	Mystic Prophecy	Fireangel
20	Marilyn Manson	The High End of Low
22	Cage	Science of Annihilation
22	Devin Townsend	Ki
22	Neaera	Omnicide – Creation Unleashed
22	Primal Fear	16.6 (Before the Devil Knows You're Dead)
22	Skyclad	In The... All Together
22	Therion	The Miskolc Experience (Live Album)
22	Unanimated	In the Light of Darkness (The Covenant of Death)
25	Ava Inferi	Blood of Bacchus
25	Heaven Shall Burn	Bildersturm – Iconoclast II (The Visual Resistance) (DVD)
25	Pathosray	Sunless Skies
25	Xasthur	All Reflections Drained
26	Bury Your Dead	It's Nothing Personal
26	Khanate	Clean Hands Go Foul
26	Minsk	With Echoes in the Movement of Stone
26	Nahemah	A New Constellation
27	Alestorm	Black Sails at Midnight
27	Glittertind	Landkjenning
27	Stream of Passion	The Flame Within
27	Trail of Tears	Bloodstained Endurance
29	Amorphis	Skyforger
29	Andreas Kisser	Hubris I & II
29	Devourment	Unleash the Carnivore
29	Necrophobic	Death To All
29	Týr	By the Light of the Northern Star
29	UFO	The Visitor

=== June ===
Day	Artist	Album
1	Avulsed	Nullo (The Pleasure of Self-Mutilation)
1	Buckethead	Forensic Follies
1	Pantheon I	Worlds I Create
2	1349	Revelations of the Black Flame
4	Pelican	Ephemeral (EP)
8	Hate	The Litanies of Satan (DVD)
8	Steel Panther	Feel the Steel
9	Amoral	Show Your Colors
9	The Autumn Offering	Requiem
9	Coalesce	OX
9	Darkness Dynamite	The Astonishing Fury of Mankind
9	Mortification	The Evil Addiction Destroying Machine
15	Artillery	When Death Comes
15	Riverside	Anno Domini High Definition
16	Graveworm	Diabolical Figures
16	Madder Mortem	Eight Ways
16	Sworn Enemy	Total World Domination
19	Deströyer 666	Defiance
19	Ex Deo	Romulus
19	Goatwhore	Carving Out The Eyes of God
19	RAM	Lightbringer
22	Asphyx	Death...The Brutal Way
22	Drudkh	Microcosmos
22	Nightrage	Wearing a Martyr's Crown
22	Spinal Tap	Back from the Dead
23	Darkest Hour	The Eternal Return
23	Dream Theater	Black Clouds & Silver Linings
23	Seventh Angel	The Dust of Years
23	Voivod	Infini
24	Elias Viljanen	Fire-Hearted
26	Korpiklaani	Karkelo
26	U.D.O.	Infected (EP)
29	Amberian Dawn	The Clouds of Northland Thunder
29	Anaal Nathrakh	In the Constellation of the Black Widow
30	Blood Red Throne	Souls of Damnation
30	Killswitch Engage	Killswitch Engage
30	Obituary	Darkest Day
30	Shining	Shining VI: Klagopsalmer
30	Suicide Silence	No Time to Bleed

=== July ===
Day	Artist	Album
6	The Project Hate	The Lustrate Process
6	Skyfire	Fractal (EP)
7	Born of Osiris	A Higher Place
7	Church of Misery	House of the Unholy
7	Grief of War	Worship
7	Job for a Cowboy	Ruination
7	Moss	Tombs of the Blind Drugged (EP)
7	Novembers Doom	Into Night's Requiem Infernal
7	Suffocation	Blood Oath
14	Arkaea	Years in the Darkness
14	Arsonists Get All the Girls	Portals
14	August Burns Red	Constellations
14	DevilDriver	Pray for Villains
14	Jorn	Spirit Black
14	Judas Priest	A Touch of Evil: Live
14	We Were Gentlemen	Living Hell
17	Horna	Musta Kaipuu
17	Manowar	Thunder in the Sky (EP)
17	Merauder	God is I
20	Onslaught	Live Damnation (live album)
21	Atheist	Unquestionable Presence: Live at Wacken (live album)
21	Stryper	Murder by Pride
21	For the Fallen Dreams	Relentless
21	The Word Alive	Empire (EP)
22	Ahab	The Divinity of Oceans
22	Persefone	Shin-Ken
24	Leaves' Eyes	My Destiny (EP)
24	Narnia	Course of a Generation
27	Dismember	Under Bloodred Skies (DVD)
27	Nazxul	Iconoclast
28	Divine Heresy	Bringer of Plagues

=== August ===
Day	Artist	Album
3	Ghost Brigade	Isolation Songs
4	Man Must Die	No Tolerance for Imperfection
6	Dead and Divine	The Machines We Are
7	Behemoth	Evangelion
10	Chthonic	Mirror of Retribution
11	Bloody Panda	Summon
11	Winds of Plague	The Great Stone War
18	Goreaphobia	Mortal Repulsion
18	Gwar	Lust in Space
18	Otep	Smash the Control Machine
21	U.D.O.	Dominator
21	Vader	Necropolis
24	Caliban	Say Hello to Tragedy
24	Municipal Waste	Massive Aggressive
25	Azaghal	Teraphim
25	Burnt by the Sun	Heart of Darkness
25	Oh, Sleeper	Son of the Morning
25	Skillet	Awake
26	Leaves' Eyes	Njord
26	Warmen	Japanese Hospitality
28	Axxis	Utopia
28	Guilt Machine	On This Perfect Day
28	Illdisposed	To Those Who Walk Behind Us
28	Jorn	The Dukebox (best of)
28	Krypteria	My Fatal Kiss
28	Saltatio Mortis	Wer Wind Sat
28	The 69 Eyes	Back in Blood

=== September ===
Day	Artist	Album
8	3 Inches of Blood	Here Waits Thy Doom
8	Advent	Naked And Cold
8	Dethklok	The Dethalbum II
9	Ablaze My Sorrow	The Suicide Note (EP)
9	Candiria	Toying with the Insanities
9	Ensiferum	From Afar
9	Insomnium	Across the Dark
9	Thunderstone	Dirt Metal
11	Secrets of the Moon	Privilegivm
11	Threat Signal	Vigilance
13	The Gates of Slumber	Hymns of Blood & Thunder
14	Skyfire	Esoteric
15	Asking Alexandria	Stand Up and Scream
15	The Black Dahlia Murder	Deflorate
15	Dream Theater	Wither (EP)
15	Dying Fetus	Descend into Depravity
15	Every Time I Die	New Junk Aesthetic
15	It Dies Today	Lividity
15	Kittie	In The Black
15	Living Colour	The Chair in the Doorway
15	Megadeth	Endgame
15	Meliah Rage	Masquerade
15	Ministry	The Last Dubber (Re-mix Album)
15	Protest the Hero	Gallop Meets the Earth (live CD/DVD)
15	Salt the Wound	Ares
15	Shadows Fall	Retribution
15	Skinlab	The Scars Between Us
18	At Vance	Ride the Sky
18	Danger Danger	Revolve
18	Europe	Last Look at Eden
18	Lynch Mob	Smoke And Mirrors
18	Sonata Arctica	The Days of Grays
18	Theatre of Tragedy	Forever Is the World
21	Diablo Swing Orchestra	Sing Along Songs for the Damned & Delirious
21	Evile	Infected Nations
21	Ronny Munroe	The Fire Within
21	Sinister	Prophecies Denied (DVD)
22	Children of Bodom	Skeletons in the Closet
22	Despised Icon	Day of Mourning
22	Echoes of Eternity	As Shadows Burn
22	Five Finger Death Punch	War Is the Answer
22	Parkway Drive	The DVD (DVD)
22	Skindred	Shark Bites and Dog Fights
22	Three Days Grace	Life Starts Now
24	Buckethead	Needle in a Slunk Stack
24	Marduk	Wormwood
25	Destruction	The Curse of the Antichrist – Live in Agony (live album)
25	Immortal	All Shall Fall
25	Metalium	Grounded – Chapter Eight
25	Paradise Lost	Faith Divides Us - Death Unites Us
26	Tyrants Blood	Crushing Onward into Oblivion
28	Arch Enemy	The Root of All Evil
28	Dalriada	Arany-Album
28	Redemption	Snowfall on Judgment Day
29	Alice in Chains	Black Gives Way to Blue
29	Austrian Death Machine	Double Brutal
29	Black Cobra	Chronomega
29	Breaking Benjamin	Dear Agony
29	Doomriders	Darkness Come Alive
29	Evergreen Terrace	Almost Home
29	Hatebreed	Hatebreed

=== October ===
Day	Artist	Album
2	Scar Symmetry	Dark Matter Dimensions
5	Marionette	Enemies
6	Ancestors	Of Sound Mind
6	Hirax	El Rostro de la Muerte
6	HORSE the band	Desperate Living
6	Inhale Exhale	Bury Me Alive
6	Kiss	Sonic Boom
6	Powerman 5000	Somewhere on the Other Side of Nowhere
9	Belphegor	Walpurgis Rites – Hexenwahn
9	Lifelover	Dekadens (EP)
9	Mob Rules	Astral Hand (EP)
10	Massacration	Good Blood Headbanguers
10	Pythia	Beneath the Veiled Embrace
12	Ram-Zet	Neutralized
12	Slowmotion Apocalypse	Mothra
12	W.A.S.P.	Babylon
13	Baroness	Blue Record
13	Dawn of Azazel	Relentless
13	Saviours	Accelerated Living
13	Skeletonwitch	Breathing the Fire
14	Decadence	Chargepoint
14	Waltari	Below Zero
16	Brainstorm	Memorial Roots
16	Epica	Design Your Universe
16	Fragments of Unbecoming	The Everhaunting Past/Chapter IV – A Splendid Retrospection
16	Rammstein	Liebe ist für alle da
16	Winger	Karma
19	Skitliv	Skandinavisk Misantropi
20	Converge	Axe to Fall
20	Portal	Swarth
21	Freak Kitchen	Land of the Freaks
21	Gorgoroth	Quantos Possunt ad Satanitatem Trahunt
21	Russian Circles	Geneva
22	Månegarm	Nattväsen
23	Hypocrisy	A Taste of Extreme Divinity
23	Savage Circus	Of Doom and Death
23	Transatlantic	The Whirlwind
24	To-Mera	Earthbound (EP)
26	Dark Tranquillity	Where Death Is Most Alive (live CD/DVD)
26	Hellbastard	Eco-War (mini-CD)
26	Hellbastard	The Need to Kill
26	My Dying Bride	Bring Me Victory (EP)
26	Rob Halford	Halford III - Winter Songs
26	Shadow Gallery	Digital Ghosts
27	Atreyu	Congregation of the Damned
27	Before There Was Rosalyn	The Fuhrer: An Allegory of a History of Deception
27	Between the Buried and Me	The Great Misdirect
27	Creed	Full Circle
27	Pelican	What We All Come to Need
27	The Red Chord	Fed Through The Teeth Machine
27	Suffocation	Live in Quebec – The Close of a Chapter (live album)
27	Whiplash	Unborn Again
28	Arkona	Goy, Rode, Goy!
28	Coldrain	Final Destination
28	Hollenthon	Tyrants and Wraiths (EP)
30	Annihilator	Live at Masters of Rock (Video album)
30	Nile	Those Whom the Gods Detest
30	Ruins	Front The Final Foes
30	Within Temptation	An Acoustic Night at the Theatre (Live Album)
31	Welicoruss	Apeiron

=== November ===
Day	Artist	Album
2	Katatonia	Night Is the New Day
2	Slayer	World Painted Blood
3	Defiance	The Prophecy
3	Genitorturers	Blackheart Revolution
3	We Came as Romans	To Plant a Seed
5	Gama Bomb	Tales from the Grave in Space
6	Brainstorm	Just Highs No Lows (12 Years of Persistence) (best-of)
6	Impious	Death Domination
6	Sonic Syndicate	Rebellion (EP)
10	Jacobs Dream	Beneath the Shadows
10	Krallice	Dimensional Bleedthrough
10	Swallow the Sun	New Moon
10	Throwdown	Deathless
10	Witchmaster	Trücizna
11	Lonewolf	The Dark Crusade
13	Mob Rules	Radical Peace
13	Nostradameus	Illusion's Parade
13	Running Wild	ReUnation – A Tribute to Running Wild (tribute album)
16	Miseration	The Mirroring Shadow
16	Urgehal	Ikonoklast
17	Devin Townsend	Addicted
17	The Empire Shall Fall	Awaken
17	Helix	Vagabond Bones
17	Rush	Working Men (Live Album)
17	Vektor	Black Future
18	Dark Funeral	Angelus Exuro pro Eternus
18	Nightwish	Lokikirja (box set)
19	Obituary	Live Xecution – Party. San 2008 (live DVD)
23	Metallica	Français Pour Une Nuit (live DVD)
24	Scorpions	Amazonia – Live in the Jungle (live DVD)
25	Elis	Catharsis
25	Outrage	Outrage
27	Manowar	Hell on Earth V (DVD)
30	Metallica	Orgullo, Pasión Y Gloria - Tres Noches En La Ciudad De México (DVD)

=== December ===
Day	Artist	Album
1	Carcass	Pungent Excruciation: Live (live album)
3	Master's Hammer	Mantras
7	Yngwie Malmsteen	High Impact (compilation)
8	Nonpoint	Cut the Cord (EP)
8	Puddle of Mudd	Volume 4: Songs in the Key of Love & Hate
9	Disarmonia Mundi	The Isolation Game
16	Helloween	Unarmed - Best of 25th Anniversary
18	Coronatus	Fabula Magna
18	Heavenly	Carpe Diem
18	Tankard	Open All Night – Reloaded (DVD)
22	Mudvayne	Mudvayne
23	Heathen	The Evolution of Chaos
26	Nokturnal Mortum	The Voice of Steel

Preceded by 2008	Heavy Metal Timeline; 2009	Succeeded by 2010
