= Darkness Dynamite =

French metalcore band

- Origin: Paris, France
- Genres: Metalcore, thrash metal, stoner rock, deathcore (early)
- Years active: 2006–present
- Labels: Musicast, Metal Blade
- Members: Junior Rodriguez; Nelson Angelo Martins; Zack Larbi; Christophe De Oliveira; Vincent Wallois
- Past members: Eddie Czaicki; Julien Granger; Desmonts Alexander; Nicolas Sarrouy
- Website: https://m.facebook.com/darknessdynamite

Darkness Dynamite is a French metalcore band from Paris, founded in 2006.

== Biography ==
With the success of their debut EP Through the Ashes of the Wolves Darkness Dynamite toured extensively with many internationally well-known band such as Korn, Sevendust, The Chariot, Becoming the Archetype, Bring Me the Horizon, Architects, Blessed by a Broken Heart, Inhatred, Maroon and Job for a Cowboy. After that, Darkness Dynamite began composing their first album. Stéphane Buriez, former singer of Loudblast and producer of bands like The Spirit of the Clan, Loudblast and Behemoth, contacted them and decided to produce their upcoming album. They were joined by a new vocalist, Junior Rodriguez and a new drummer, Julien Granger, shortly after. The Astonishing Fury of Mankind was released 6 June 2009.

The band's fourth studio album, Under the Painted Sky, received a 3.5-star rating from Metal Hammer.

== Band members ==
=== Current ===
- Chris de Oliveira – bass (2007–present)
- Zack Larbi – guitar, vocals (2007–present)
- Nelson Martins – guitar, vocals (2007–present)
- Junior Rodriguez – vocals (2008–present)
- Vincent Wallois – drums (2009–present)

=== Former ===
- Eddie Czaicki – vocals (2007–2008)
- Alexandre Desmonts – drums (2007–2009)

Timeline

== Discography ==
- Darkness Dynamite – 2006
- Through the Ashes of the Wolves – 2007
- The Astonishing Fury of Mankind – 2009
- Under the Painted Sky – 2013
