= Fables & Dreams =

Studio album by Lunatica
- Released: October 18, 2004
- Recorded: 2004
- Genre: Symphonic metal
- Length: 51:39
- Label: Frontiers Records
- Producer: Sascha Paeth

Lunatica chronology
Atlantis (2001)	Fables & Dreams (2004)	The Edge of Infinity (2006)

Professional ratings
Review scores
Source	Rating
Metal Storm	8/10 stars
Scream	5/6 stars

Fables & Dreams is the second studio album from the Swiss symphonic metal band Lunatica. It was released on October 18, 2004.

== Track listing ==
All lyrics are written by Andrea Dätwyler, except where indicated.

No.	Title	Lyrics	Music	Length
1.	"The Search Goes On"		Alex Seiberl	4:15
2.	"Avalon"		Seiberl	3:42
3.	"Elements"		Seiberl, André Leuenberger	6:54
4.	"Fable of Dreams"	Dätwyler, Seiberl	Seiberl	5:22
5.	"Still Believe"		Seiberl, Sandro D’Incau	6:11
6.	"The Spell"		Seiberl, D’Incau, Leuenberger	4:48
7.	"The Neverending Story"		Seiberl, Dätwyler	5:36
8.	"Hymn" (Ultravox cover)	Chris Cross, Warren Cann, Billy Currie, Midge Ure	Chris Cross, Warren Cann, Billy Currie, Midge Ure	4:30
9.	"Silent Scream (2004)"		Seiberl, D’Incau	5:23
10.	"A Little Moment of Desperation"		Seiberl, D’Incau	4:58
