= Atlantis (Lunatica album) =

Studio album by Lunatica
- Released: 2001
- Recorded: 2001
- Genre: Symphonic metal, gothic metal
- Length: 36:41
- Label: Frontiers Records

Lunatica chronology
Atlantis (2001)	Fables & Dreams (2004)

Atlantis is the first studio album by the Swiss Symphonic metal band Lunatica, released in 2001.

== Track listing ==
Track	Name	Length
01	"The Search Begins..."	2:09
02	"World Under Ice"	4:54
03	"The Landing"	4:06
04	"Atlantis"	5:23
05	"Silent Scream"	6:28
06	"Garden of Delight"	6:02
07	"Time"	4:01
08	"Between Love and Hate"	5:41
