= Buried in the Front Yard =

Studio album by Rumpelstiltskin Grinder
- Released: October 11, 2005
- Genre: Thrash metal
- Length: 34:35
- Label: Relapse

Rumpelstiltskin Grinder chronology
Raped by Bears (2003)	Buried in the Front Yard (2005)	Living for Death, Destroying the Rest (2009)

Professional ratings
Review scores
Source	Rating
AllMusic	3/5 stars
Blabbermouth.net	8/10

Buried in the Front Yard is the debut full-length studio album by thrash metal band Rumpelstiltskin Grinder.

== Track listing ==
- All songs written by Rumpelstiltskin Grinder, except where noted.
1. "Stealing E.T." – 4:11
2. "Orange & Black Attack" - 5:01
3. "Grab a Shovel (We've Got Bodies to Bury)" – 4:50
4. "The Day Merman Met Todd "The Harpoon" Wilson" – 4:26 (Lyrics: Jason Sidote; music: R.G.)
5. "Unleash the Troll" – 3:46
6. "Grinder" – 4:17 (Lyrics: Sidote; music: R.G.)
7. "Let the Fools Cheer" - 3:41
8. "Ode to Tanks" - 4:10 (Lyrics: Sidote; music: R.G.)

== Personnel ==
- Eli Shaika - Vocals
- Melissa Moore - Guitars
- Ryan Moll - Guitars
- Shawn Riley - Bass
- Patrick Battaglia - Drums
