= IV - One With the Storm =

Studio album by Ghost Brigade
- Released: November 7, 2014
- Genre: Melodic death metal, doom metal, post-metal
- Length: 66:08
- Label: Season of Mist
- Producer: Tuomas Kokko

Ghost Brigade chronology
Until Fear No Longer Defines Us (2011)	IV - One With the Storm (2014)

IV - One With the Storm is the fourth and final studio album of the Finnish doom metal band Ghost Brigade. The album peaked at No. 16 on the Finnish Albums Chart.

== Track listing ==
No.	Title	Length
1.	"Wretched Blues"	6:19
2.	"Departures"	4:58
3.	"Aurora"	6:56
4.	"Disembodied Voices"	5:36
5.	"Electra Complex"	10:34
6.	"Stones and Pillars"	4:47
7.	"Anchored"	5:38
8.	"The Knife"	6:19
9.	"Long Way to the Graves"	7:39
10.	"Elämä on Tulta" (Life is a Fire)	7:22
Total length:		66:08
