= Guided by Fire =

Guided By Fire

Studio album by Ghost Brigade
- Released: September 25, 2007
- Recorded: 2007 At Seawolf Studios In Helsinki, Finland
- Genre: Post-metal, progressive metal, melodic death metal, doom metal, gothic metal
- Label: Season of Mist
- Producer: Mikko Kartano, Aaro Seppovaara

Ghost Brigade chronology
Guided By Fire (2007)	Isolation Songs (2009)

Alternative Cover

Professional ratings
Review scores
Source	Rating
Allmusic	3.5/5 stars

Guided By Fire is the first studio album of the Finnish doom metal band Ghost Brigade. It features Aleksi Munter of Swallow the Sun fame providing guest keyboards and Fredrik Nordin of the band Dozer providing backing vocals.

== Track listing ==
No.	Title	Length
1.	"Rails At The River"	4:48
2.	"Hold On Thin Line"	4:10
3.	"Horns"	3:52
4.	"Minus Side"	4:10
5.	"Away And Here"	4:09
6.	"Along The Barriers"	3:29
7.	"Based On You"	4:15
8.	"Disgusted By The Light"	4:32
9.	"Autoemotive"	6:15
10.	"Deliberately"	5:08
Total length:		44:55

== Personnel ==
=== Band members ===
- Manne Ikonen – lead vocals
- Tommi Kiviniemi – guitar
- Wille Naukkarinen – guitar
- Veli-Matti Suihkonen – drums, percussion
- Janne Julin – bass

=== Guests ===
- Aleksi Munter (Swallow the Sun) – keyboard
- Fredrik Nordin (Dozer) – guest vocals

=== Production ===
- Mikko Poikolainen - production, mastering, mixing, engineering
- Aaro Seppovaara - mixing, mastering
- Tommi Kiviniemi - photography
- Benjamin Farwicker - photography
- Hollowman - cover art
