= Until Fear No Longer Defines Us =

Studio album by Ghost Brigade
- Released: August 19, 2011 (Europe)
- Genre: Melodic death metal, gothic metal, death-doom
- Label: Season of Mist

Ghost Brigade chronology
Isolation Songs (2009)	Until Fear No Longer Defines Us (2011)	IV - One With the Storm (2014)

Professional ratings
Review scores
Source	Rating
Allmusic	Positive
Savon Sanomat	4/5 stars

Until Fear No Longer Defines Us is the third studio album of the Finnish doom metal band Ghost Brigade, released on August 19, 2011 in Europe and on August 22, 2011 in North America. The album peaked at No. 7 on the Finnish Albums Chart.

== Track listing ==
No.	Title	Length
1.	"In the Woods"	4:17
2.	"Clawmaster"	6:34
3.	"Chamber"	6:39
4.	"Traces of Liberty"	4:00
5.	"Divine Act of Lunacy"	5:01
6.	"Grain"	5:25
7.	"Breakwater"	8:50
8.	"Cult of Decay"	4:45
9.	"Torn"	4:43
10.	"Soulcarvers"	7:52
Total length:		58:13

== Personnel ==
=== Band members ===
- Manne Ikonen – lead vocals
- Tommi Kiviniemi – guitar
- Wille Naukkarinen – guitar
- Veli-Matti Suihkonen – drums, percussion
- Janne Julin – bass

=== Guests ===
- Aleksi Munter (Swallow the Sun) – keyboard

=== Production ===
- Antti Malinen – mixing, engineering, recording
- Jaakko Viitalähde – mastering
- Jussi Ratilainen – photography
