= The Edge of Infinity =

Studio album by Lunatica
- Released: August 28, 2006
- Recorded: 2006
- Genre: Symphonic metal, power metal
- Length: 45:25
- Label: Frontiers Records

Lunatica chronology
Fables & Dreams (2004)	The Edge of Infinity (2006)	New Shores (2009)

Professional ratings
Review scores
Source	Rating
Allmusic	2.5/5 stars
Melodic.net	4/5 stars

The Edge of Infinity is the third full-length album by the Swiss band Lunatica. It was released on August 28, 2006. A release party took place at Schützi in Olten (Switzerland) on September 23, 2006.

The band had originally held a poll to pick a cover song to include on the album, although they decided not to include any cover song after all, having enough of their own compositions for the album.

== Track listing ==
1. "Introduction" - 1:56
2. "The Edge of Infinity" - 4:08
3. "Sons of the Wind" - 5:25
4. "Who You Are" - 3:41
5. "Out!" - 3:42
6. "Song for You" (featuring John Payne) - 4:09
7. "Together" - 4:02
8. "The Power of Love" - 5:17
9. "Words Unleashed" - 4:15
10. "EmOcean" - 8:50 (featuring Oliver Hartmann in some versions)

== Videos ==
A video for Song for You was released in early 2007 in the band's official website.

== Charts ==
Chart (2009)	Peak position
Japanese Albums (Oricon)	188
Swiss Albums (Schweizer Hitparade)	76
