= Order (album) =

Studio album by Maroon
- Released: 17 April 2009
- Recorded: 2009
- Studio: Klangschmiede Studio E, Mellrichstadt, Germany
- Genre: Metalcore
- Length: 45:11
- Label: Century Media

Maroon chronology
The Cold Heart of the Sun (2007)	Order (2009)

Order is the fifth and final studio album by the German metalcore band Maroon. It was released on 17 April 2009 though Century Media Records. The album debuted at number 63 on the German Media Control Charts.

== Track listing ==
1. "Morin Heights" – 1:22
2. "Erode" – 4:00
3. "Stay Brutal" – 3:47
4. "A New Order" – 3:26
5. "Bleak" – 6:23
6. "This Ship Is Sinking" – 4:23
7. "Call of Telah" – 0:54
8. "Leave You Scared & Broken" – 4:40
9. "Children of the Next Level" – 3:18
10. "Bombs Over Ignorance" – 3:22
11. "Wolves at the End of the Street" – 4:01
12. "Schatten" – 7:35
13. "Under the Surface" (Bonus Track) – 4:29
14. "Wider Allem" (Bonus Track) – 2:53
15. "Teenage Kicks" (Bonus Track) – 2:23
16. "Maschinerie" (Bonus Track) – 3:51

The song "Schatten" is the longest track on the album and is completely written in German.

== Personnel ==
- Andre Moraweck – vocals
- Sebastian Grund – guitar
- Sebastian Rieche – guitar
- Tom Eric Moraweck – bass guitar
- Nick Wachsmuth – drums
