= The Grand Partition and the Abrogation of Idolatry =

Studio album by Success Will Write Apocalypse Across the Sky
- Released: May 5, 2009
- Recorded: 2008–2009
- Genre: Death metal
- Length: 38:01
- Label: Nuclear Blast

Success Will Write Apocalypse Across the Sky chronology
Subhuman Empire (2007)	The Grand Partition and the Abrogation of Idolatry (2009)

Professional ratings
Review scores
Source	Rating
Allmusic	3/5 stars

The Grand Partition and the Abrogation of Idolatry is the debut album by American death metal band Success Will Write Apocalypse Across the Sky, Produced, Mixed and Mastered by James Murphy, and released on May 5, 2009 through Nuclear Blast.

== Track listing ==
1. "10,000 Sermons, One Solution" - 2:29
2. "The Realization That Mankind Is Viral in Its Nature" - 1:40
3. "Cattle" - 2:17
4. "Agenda" - 2:47
5. "Pity the Living, Envy the Dead" - 0:52
6. "Despot" - 3:10
7. "A Path" - 2:11
8. "Automated Oration and the Abolition of Silence" - 2:53
9. "One Must Imagine Sisyphus Happy" - 3:18
10. "Colossus" - 1:33
11. "Retrograde and the Anointed" - 2:37
12. "Of Worms, Jesus Christ, and Jackson County, Missouri" - 3:15
13. "The Tamagotchi Gesture" - 3:14
14. (Untitled hidden track) - 8:34

== Personnel ==
- John Collett – vocals
- Aaron Haines – guitar
- Ian Sturgill – guitar
- Matt Simpson – bass
- Jen Muse – samples
- Mike Heller – Session drums
- James Murphy - Producer
