= The Astonishing Fury of Mankind =

Studio album by Darkness Dynamite
- Released: June 9, 2009
- Recorded: August 2008
- Genre: Metalcore, thrash metal, stoner rock
- Label: Metal Blade

Darkness Dynamite chronology
The Astonishing Fury of Mankind (2009)	Under The Painted Sky (2013)

Professional ratings
Review scores
Source	Rating
AllMusic	2.5/5 stars
About.com	3/5 stars
Rock Sound	8/10

The Astonishing Fury of Mankind is the debut studio album by French metal band Darkness Dynamite.

== Track listing ==
All tracks by Darkness Dynamite

1. "Supernatural" – 3:17
2. "Hell Eve Hate" – 2:59
3. "Immersion Inner-Nation" – 3:54
4. "$15" – 4:33
5. "Chasing Inside" – 3:56
6. "A Simple Taste of..." – 0:59
7. "Vice!" – 3:19
8. "By My Own" – 3:17
9. "Dare I Say" – 2:56
10. "The Everlasting Grace of Mind" – 3:18
11. "The Astonishing Fury of Mankind" – 5:52

== Personnel ==
- Junior Rodriguez – lead vocals
- Nelson Angelo Martins – lead guitar, backing vocals, keyboards
- Zack Larbi – rhythm guitar, backing vocals
- Christophe De Oliveira – bass guitar
- Julien «Power» Granger – drums

Production

- Engineered by Stephane Buriez (Guitars), Olivier T'servranex (Drums), Nelson Martins and Junior Rodriguez, at Elektricbox Studio, Lille
- Mixed and mastered by Remyboy, at Ahddenteam Studio, Lille
