= Altitude (Autumn album) =

Studio album by Autumn
- Released: 13 February 2009
- Recorded: 2008, Graveland Studio & SplitSecondSound studios
- Genre: Gothic metal Alternative metal
- Length: 50:26
- Label: Metal Blade
- Producer: Arno Krabman & Jochem Jacobs

Autumn chronology
My New Time (2007)	Altitude (2009)	Cold Comfort (2011)

Professional ratings
Review scores
Source	Rating
AllMusic	3.5/5 stars
Sputnikmusic	2.5/5 stars

Altitude is the fourth studio album by the Dutch gothic metal band Autumn, released in Europe 13 February 2009 and on 23 February 2009 in North America.

== Track listing ==
No.	Title	Length
1.	"Paradise Nox"	5:31
2.	"Liquid Under Film Noir"	3:59
3.	"Skydancer"	3:42
4.	"Synchro-Minds"	4:19
5.	"The Heart Demands"	4:58
6.	"A Minor Dance"	5:24
7.	"Cascade (For a Day)"	3:54
8.	"Horizon Line"	4:44
9.	"Sulphur Rodents"	3:35
10.	"Answers Never Questioned"	4:01
11.	"Altitude"	6:18
Total length:		50:26

Bonus tracks
No.	Title	Length
12.	"One Word Reminder"	4:03
13.	"Closure"	5:05
Total length:		59:34

== Charts ==
Chart (2009)	Peak position
Dutch Albums (Album Top 100)	94
