= New Shores =

Studio album by Lunatica
- Released: February 27, 2009
- Recorded: August – October 2008
- Genre: Symphonic metal
- Label: Napalm Records

Lunatica chronology
The Edge of Infinity (2006)	New Shores (2009)

Professional ratings
Review scores
Source	Rating
The Metal Crypt	3.75/5

New Shores is the fourth full-length album by the Swiss band Lunatica. It was released on February 27, 2009.

== Track listing ==
1. "New Shores" – 5:19
2. "Two Dreamers" – 4:19
3. "How Did It Come to This?" – 3:56
4. "The Incredibles" – 3:55
5. "My Hardest Walk" – 5:59
6. "Farewell My Love" – 4:23
7. "The Chosen Ones" – 5:17
8. "Heart of a Lion" – 3:52
9. "Into the Dissonance" – 4:11
10. "Winds of Heaven" – 3:52
11. "The Day the Falcon Dies" – 5:00
12. "Timekeeper (Japanese Edition Bonus Track)" - 4:02

== Charts ==
Chart (2009)	Peak position
Japanese Albums (Oricon)	257
Swiss Albums (Schweizer Hitparade)	20
