= Isolation Songs =

Album by Ghost Brigade

Studio album by Ghost Brigade
- Released: August 3, 2009 (Europe); August 25, 2009 (North America)
- Recorded: Seawolf Studios, Helsinki, Finland
- Genre: Melodic death metal, doom metal, post-metal, alternative metal
- Label: Season of Mist
- Producer: Antti Malinen

Ghost Brigade chronology
Guided By Fire (2007)	Isolation Songs (2009)	Until Fear No Longer Defines Us (2011)

Professional ratings
Review scores
Source	Rating
Lambgoat	8/10 stars

Isolation Songs is the second studio album of the Finnish doom metal band Ghost Brigade.

== Track listing ==
No.	Title	Length
1.	"Suffocated"	5:28
2.	"My Heart Is A Tomb"	4:27
3.	"Into The Black Light"	5:27
4.	"Lost In A Loop"	5:03
5.	"22:22 - Nihil"	5:48
6.	"Architect Of New Beginnings"	4:32
7.	"Birth"	9:01
8.	"Concealed Revulsions"	5:30
9.	"Secrets Of The Earth"	5:04
10.	"A Storm Inside"	6:20
Total length:		56:40

Limited Edition Bonus Tracks
No.	Title	Length
11.	"Liar"	4:00
Total length:		1:00:40

== Personnel ==
=== Band members ===
- Manne Ikonen - lead vocals
- Tommi Kiviniemi - guitar
- Wille Naukkarinen - guitar
- Veli-Matti Suihkonen - drums, percussion
- Janne Julin - bass

=== Guests ===
- Aleksi Munter (Swallow the Sun) – keyboard
- Richard Humphries - sound sample on “Secrets Of The Earth”
- Ilari Autio - cello

=== Production ===
- Antti Malinen - mixing, engineering, recording
- Pelle Henricsson - mastering
