= Dark the Suns =

Finnish melodic death/gothic metal band

- Origin: Finland
- Genres: Gothic metal, melodic death metal
- Years active: 2005–2013, 2020–present
- Label: Inverse Records

Dark the Suns is a melodic death/gothic metal band formed in 2005 in Jyväskylä, Finland. They are signed to Inverse Records.

== History ==
Founded as a solo project by vocalist and guitarist Mikko Ojala in 2005, a demo was followed by the release of the full-length In Darkness Comes Beauty in 2006 once Dark the Suns became a full band. 2007 and 2008 brought local gigs, and a short Baitian mini-tour in May 2008. Some line-up changes occurred, including drummer Eino and keyboardist Pinja replacing Markus and Juha respectively. Later in the year Juha returned as a second guitarist.

The second album was called All Ends In Silence and got enthusiastic reviews.

The EP The Dead End was released in autumn 2008, and it features a cover of HIM's "When Love and Death Embrace". The first web-single from All Ends In Silence, "Rimed With Frost", was released in January 2009. It was followed by a further web-single, "Everlasting", in February. The album itself was planned for 11 March 2009, but was pushed back a week by the label, and then another week to 25 March, the date it was actually released.

Drummer Eino moved to Helsinki in March 2009, and original drummer Markus returned to the band.

In February 2010 Dark The Suns released their very first video for the track 'Unbroken Silence' from their 2009 album All Ends in Silence.

Dark the Suns' third album Sleepwalking in a Nightmare was supposed to be released in Autumn 2010. It was released on November 24, 2010, in Finland by Firebox Records, and then reissued on March 27, 2012, in U.S. by Metalhit.

The band made an announcement that it was splitting up in early 2013.

Following a 7-year hiatus, the band released a teaser for their upcoming single "Suru Raivosi Sydämeni Pimeydessä", on March 30, 2020, indicating their return.

== Line-up ==
Current Members

- Mikko Ojala: vocals, guitar, drums
- Inka Ojala: bass, keyboards, synthesizers, backing vocals
- Jani Moilanen: guitar (with 2023 years)

== Discography ==
- In Darkness Comes Beauty (2007)
- The Dead End (EP, 2008)
- All Ends in Silence (2009)
- Sleepwalking in a Nightmare (2010)
- Life Eternal (Compilation, 2015)
- Suru Raivosi Sydämeni Pimeydessä (2021)
- Raven and the Nightsky (2023)
