= Black Messiah (band) =

German metal band

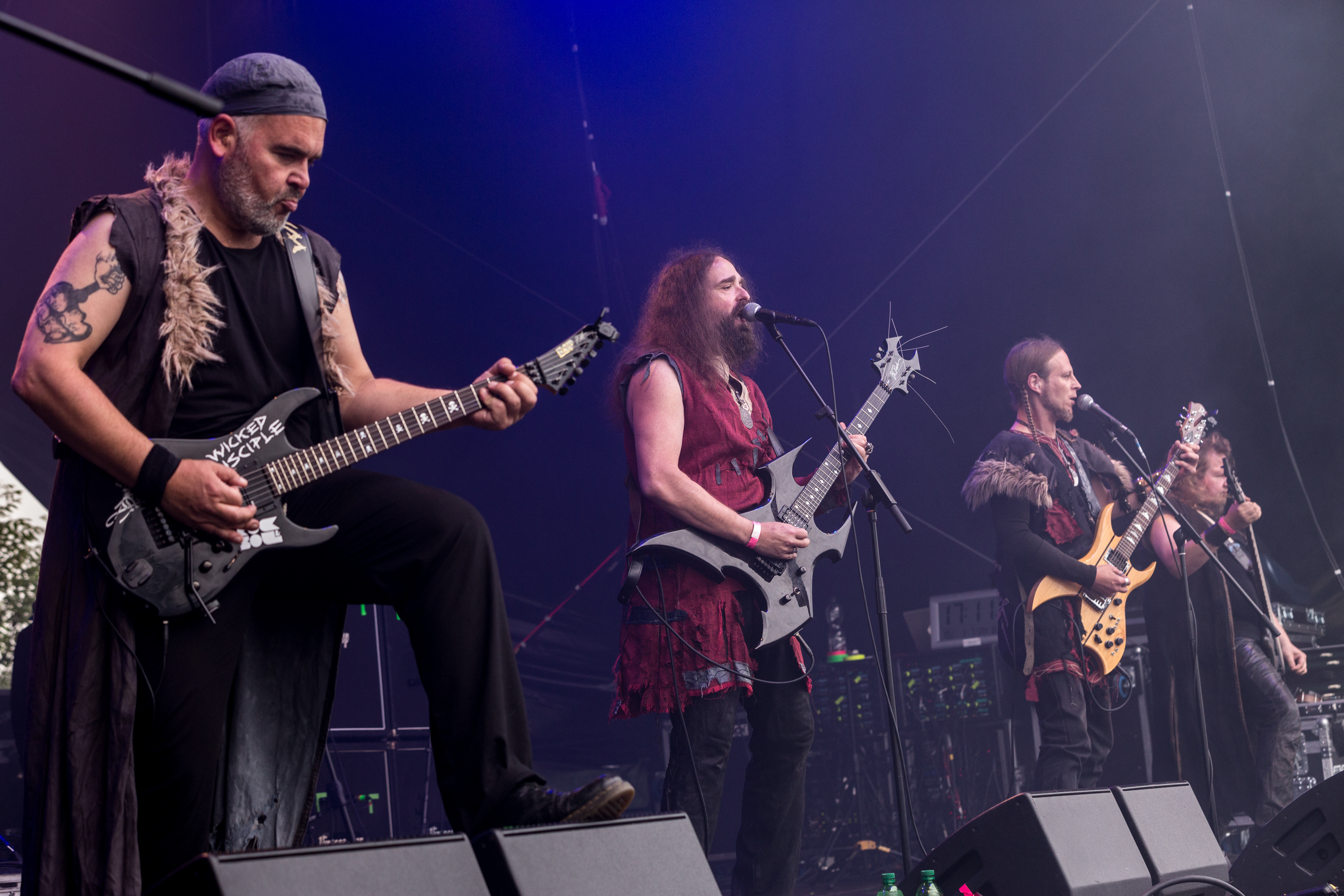
- Black Messiah at Metal Frenzy Festival 2017 in Gardelegen

Background information
- Origin: Gelsenkirchen, Germany
- Genres: Viking metal Symphonic black metal
- Years active: 1992—present
- Labels: Last Episode Productions; Einheit Produktionen; AFM Records
- Members: Zagan RD; Zoran; Meldric; Agnar; Garm; Mike 'Brööh' Bröker
- Website: blackmessiah.de

Black Messiah is a German Viking / symphonic black metal band, founded in 1992.

== History ==
Having started as a pure black metal band, Black Messiah's sound evolved to Viking metal with the release of their Oath of a Warrior album. They have released seven full-length albums.

== Members ==
=== Current line-up ===
- Zagan RD - bass (1992–2000), vocals (1992-present), guitars, violin, mandolin (1996–present)
- Garm - bass (2001–2004, 2006–present)
- Ymir - guitars (2012–present)
- Ask - keyboard (2014–present)
- Donar (Patrick Donath) - guitars (2015–present)
- Surtr - drums (2015–present)
Black Messiah, current line-up live at Metal Frenzy 2017, Gardelegen

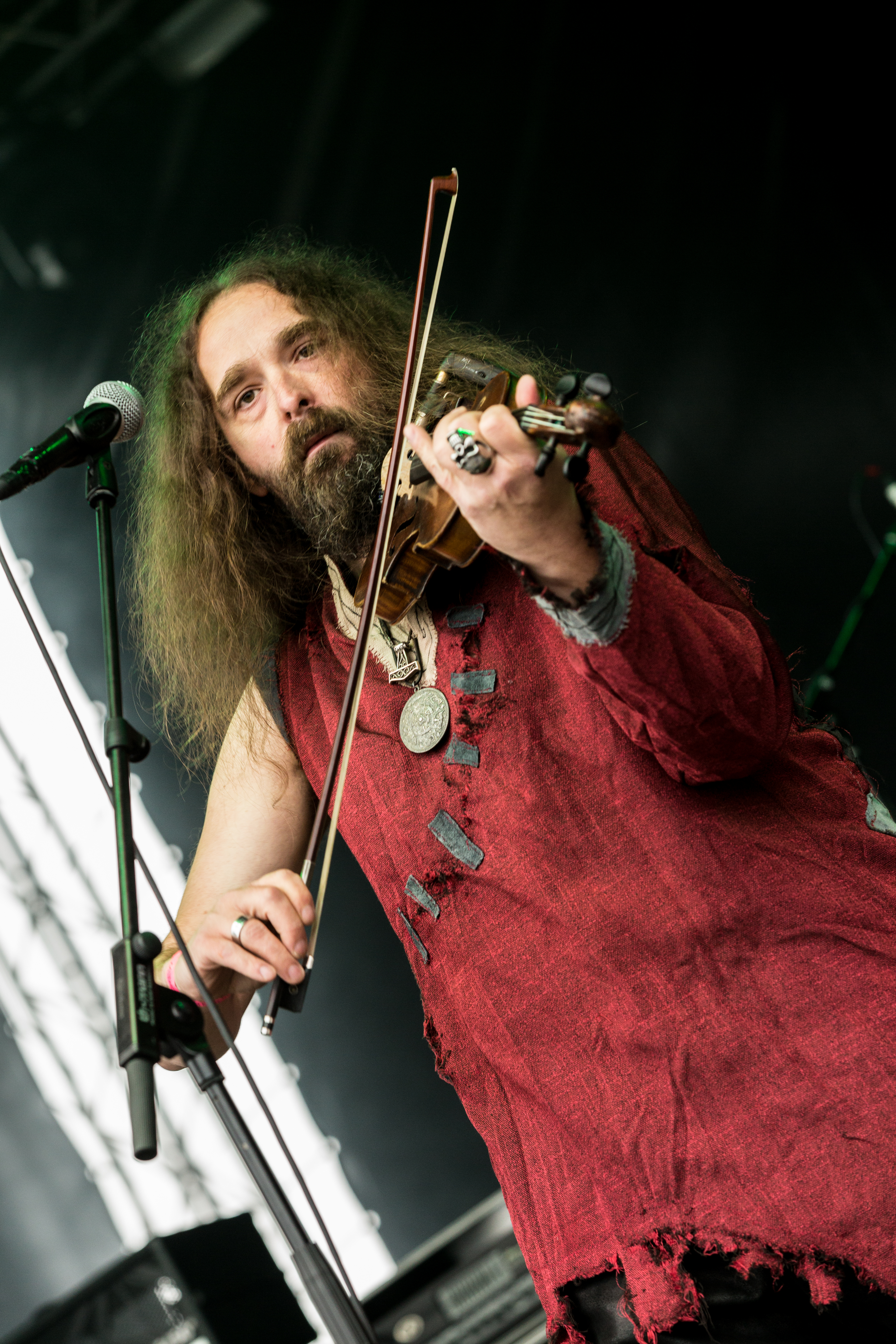
Zagan

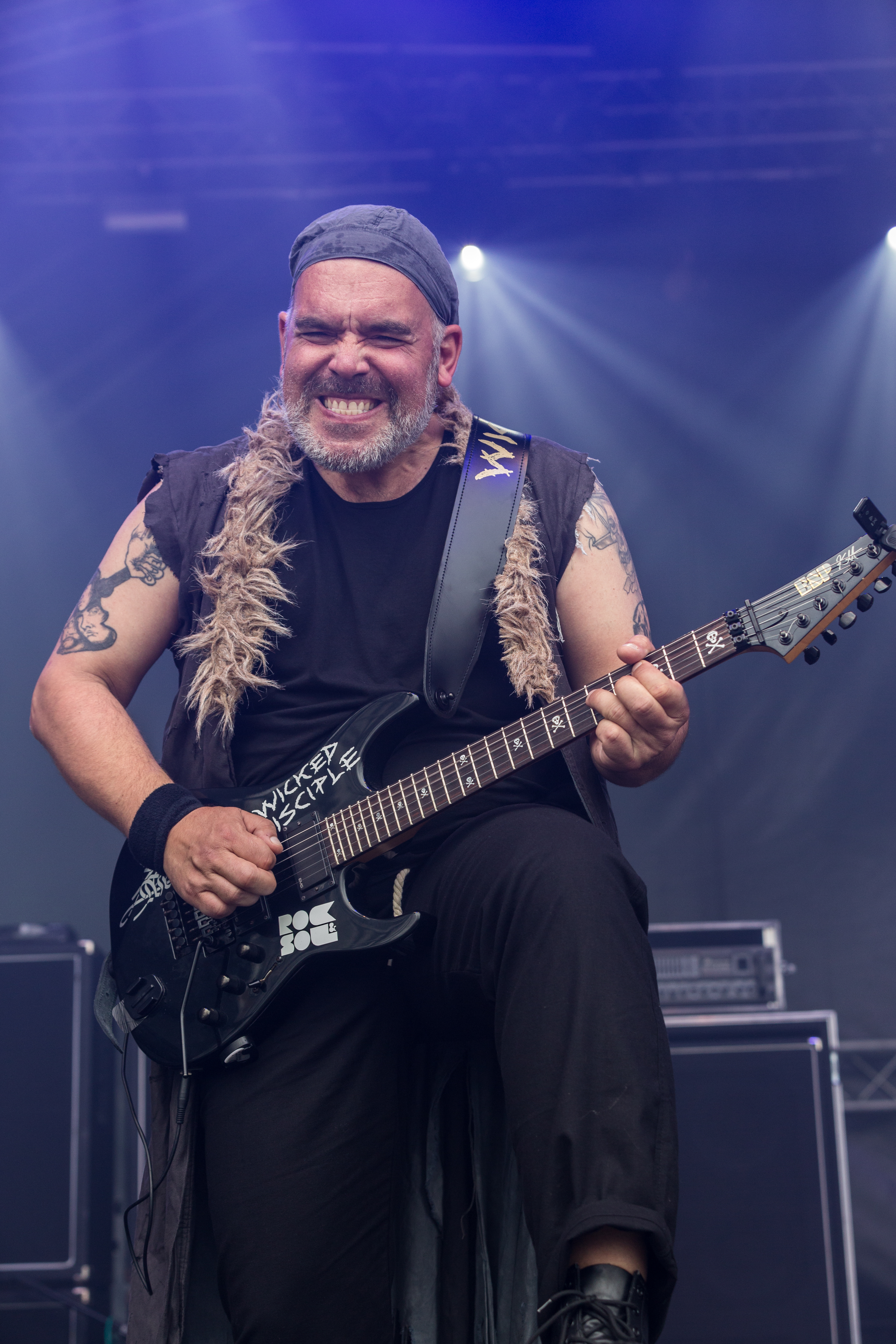
Donar

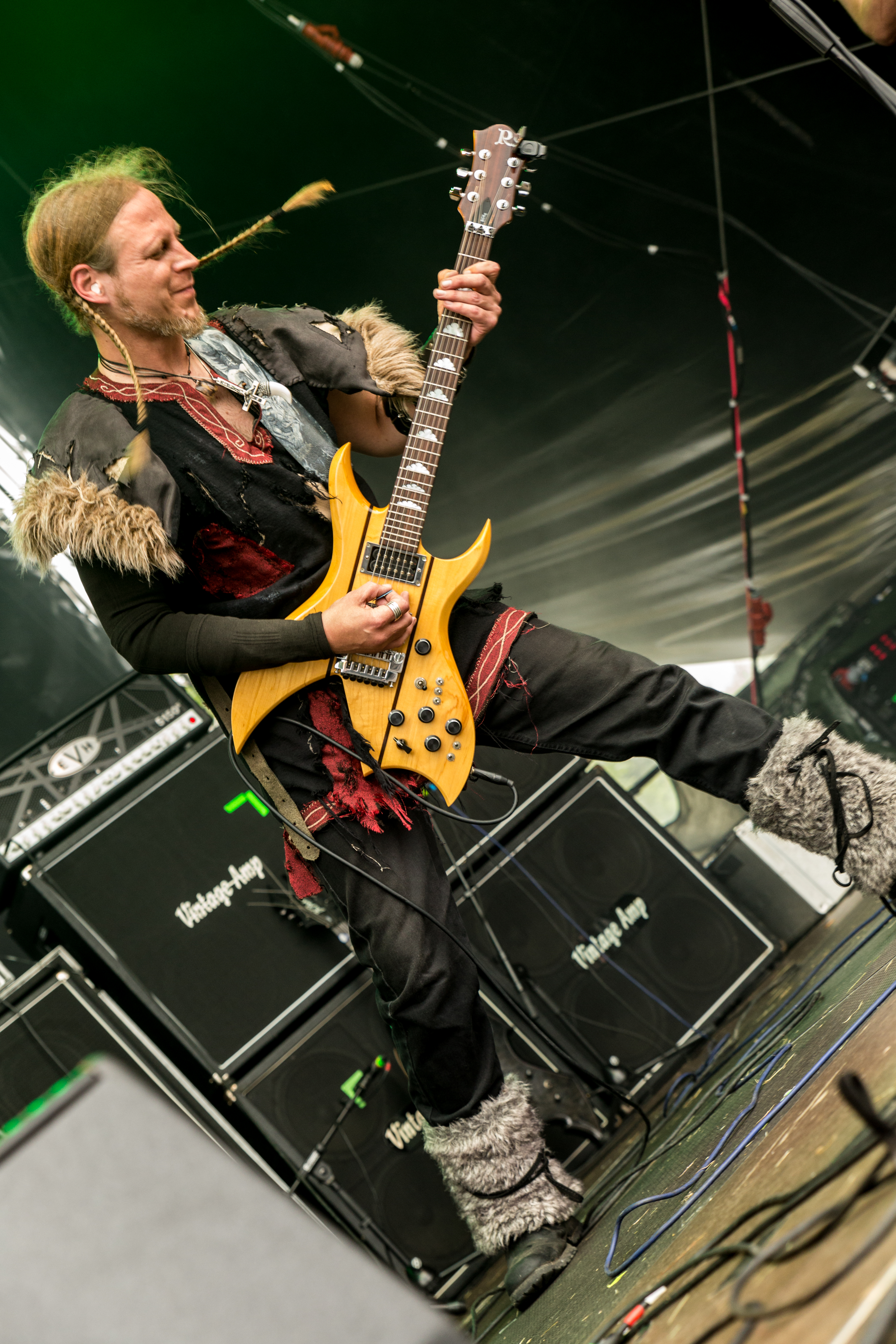
Pete

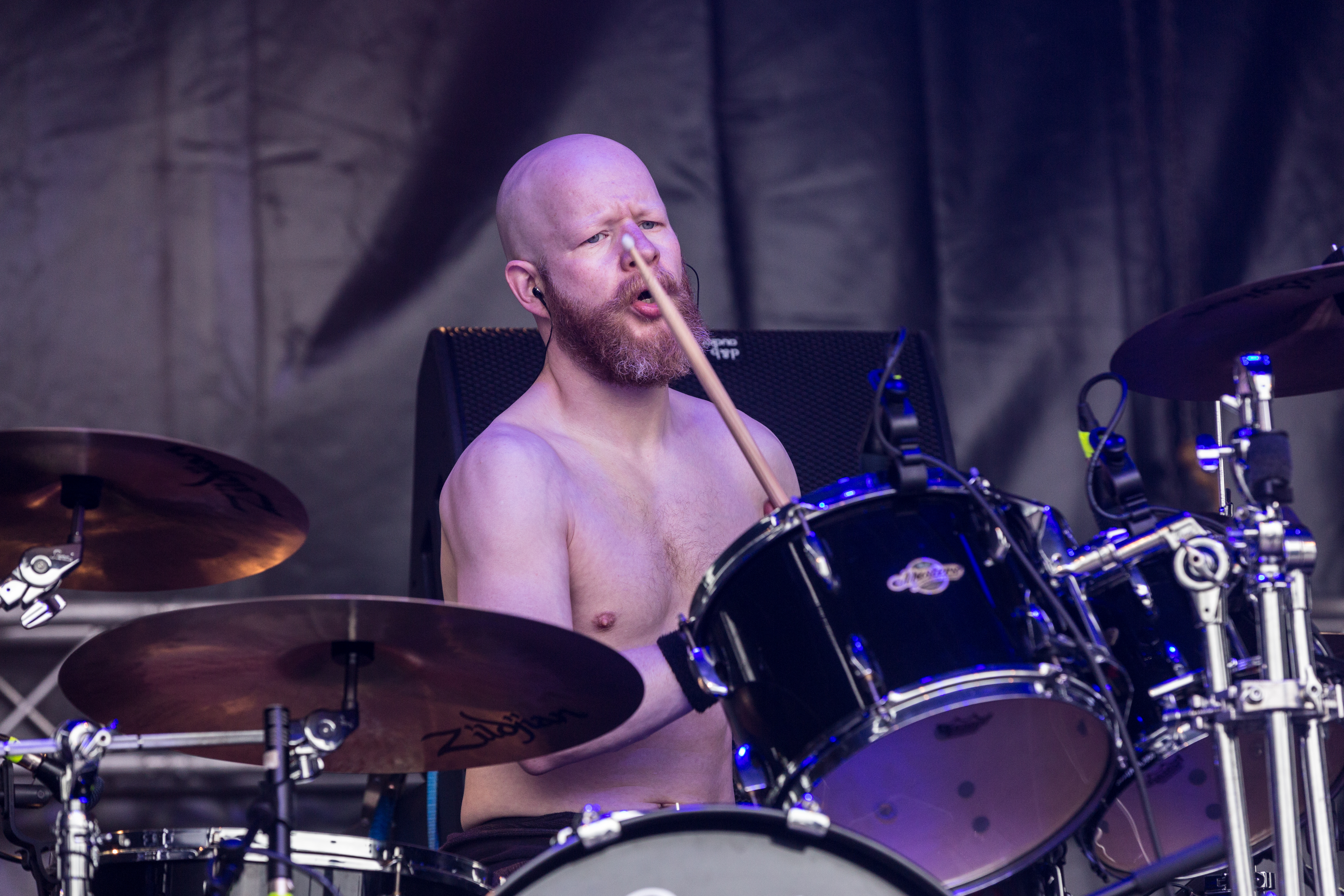
Surtr

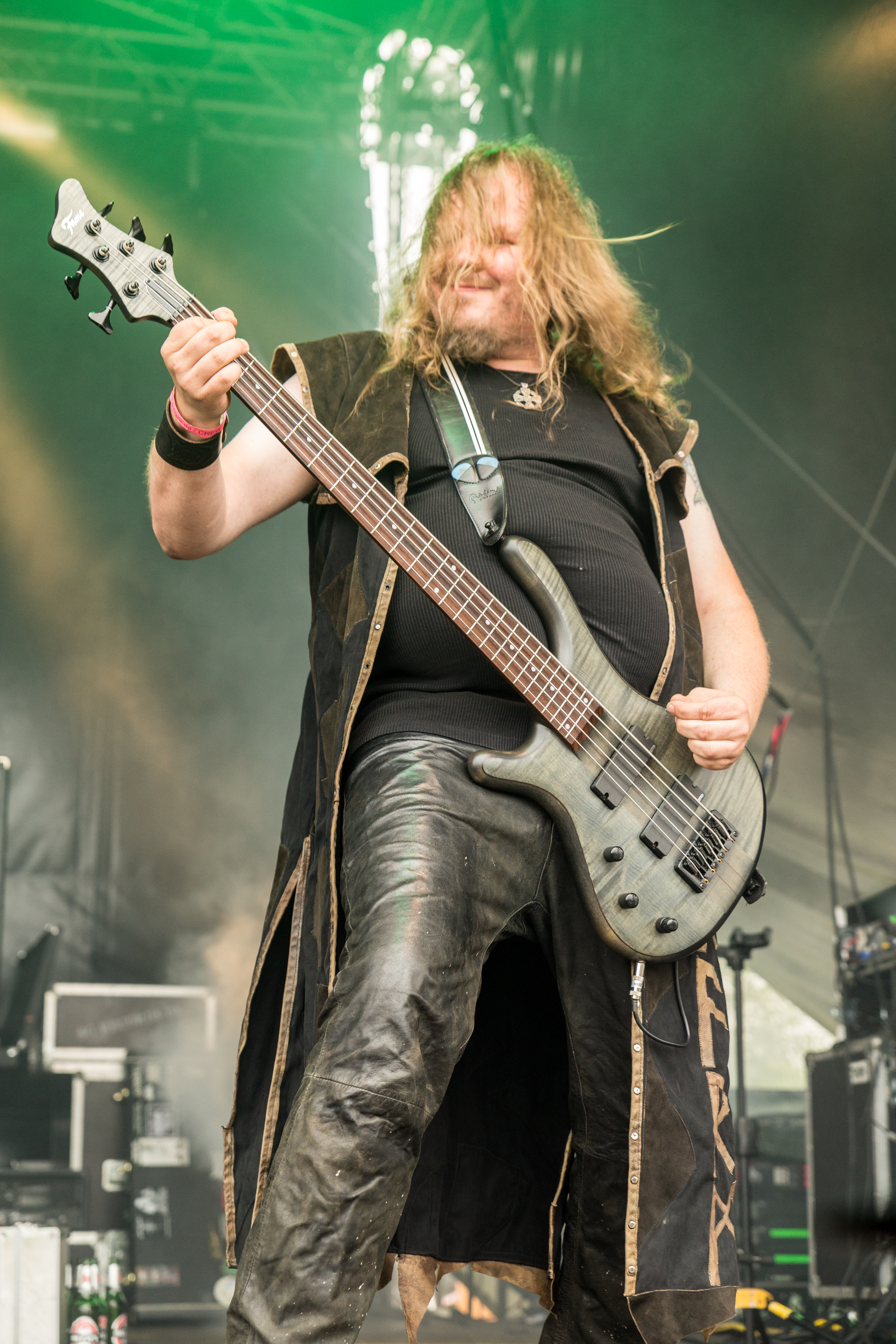
Garm

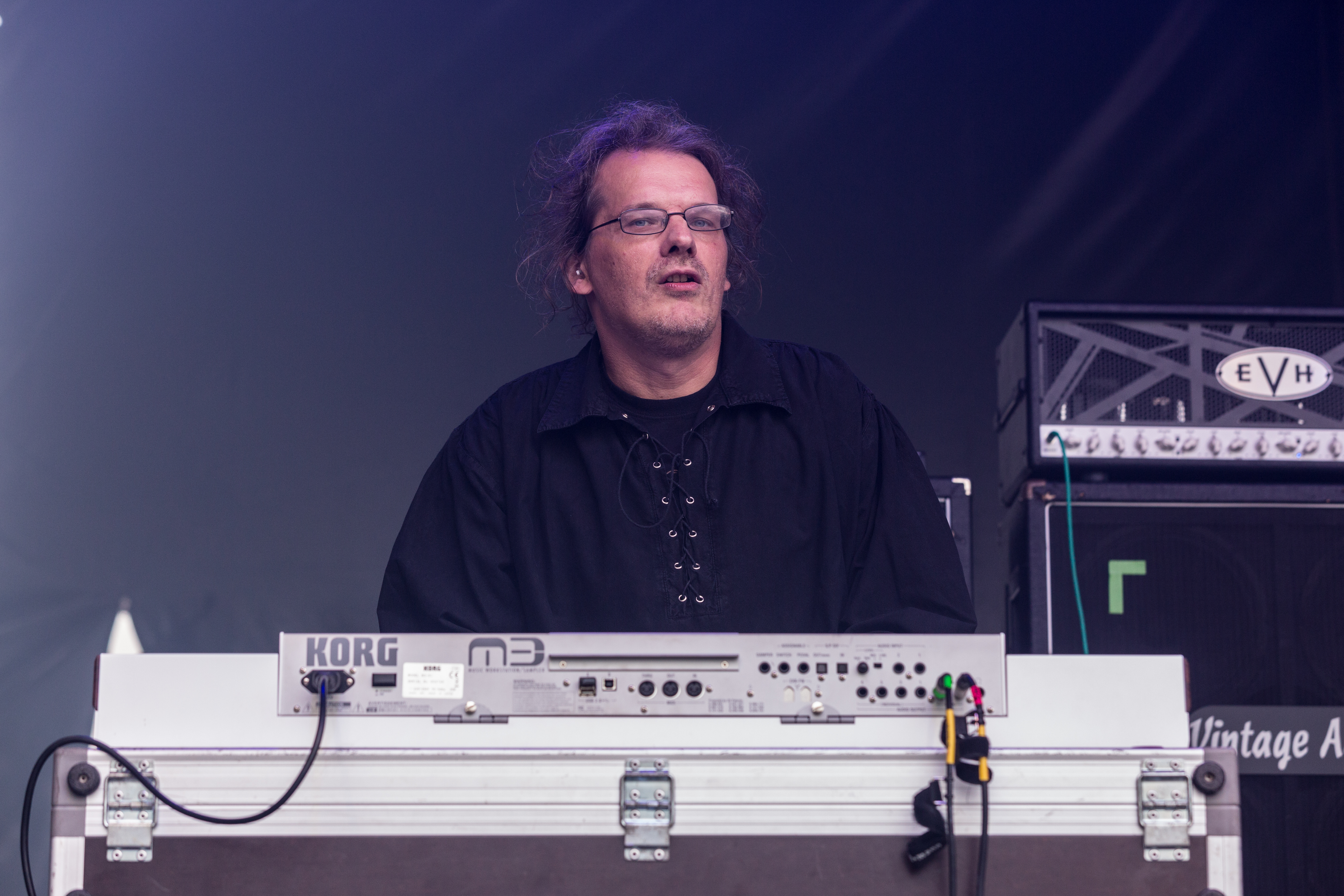
Ask

=== Former members ===
- Reverend Heidenbluth - drums (1992–1996)
- Frohnleichnam - guitars (1992–1996)
- Nabahm - drums (1997–2001)
- Drahco - bass (2004–2005)
- Surthur - drums (2004–2006)
- Zoran Novak - guitars (2004–2010)
- Meldric - guitars (2004–2012)
- Hrym - keyboards (2004–2006)
- Niörd - bass (2005–2006)
- Agnar - keyboards (2001–2004, 2006–2014)
- Fringes - guitars (2010–2014)
- Mike 'Brööh' Broker - drums (2001–2004, 2006–present)

== Discography ==
=== Albums ===
- Sceptre of Black Knowledge (1998)
- Oath of a Warrior (2005)
- Of Myths and Legends (2006)
- First War of the World (2009)
- The Final Journey (2012)
- Heimweh (2013)
- Walls of Vanaheim (2017)

=== Demos ===
- Southside Golgotha (1995)
- Demo 2001 (2001)
- Roughmix 2004 (2004)
- Futhark (2004)
