= Success Will Write Apocalypse Across the Sky =

American death metal band

- Origin: Tampa, Florida, United States
- Genres: Death metal
- Years active: 2006–present
- Label: Nuclear Blast
- Spinoff of: Bodies in the Gears of the Apparatus
- Members: John Collett; Ian Sturgill; Matt Simpson; Jennifer Muse; Shaun DeLeon
- Past members: Pete Lamb; Mike Petrak; Jesse Jolly; Chris Woodall; JR Daniels; Aaron Haines

Success Will Write Apocalypse Across the Sky (SWWAATS) is an American death metal band from Tampa, Florida, formed in 2006. The group was founded by guitarists Aaron Haines and Ian Sturgill, shortly after the disbandment of their previous band, Bodies in the Gears of the Apparatus. The band's name was inspired by a 1989 text titled "Apocalypse", written by William S. Burroughs (in which "he describes art and creative expression taking a literal and physical form"), and also "inspired and supported by a healthy amount of paranoia," as guitarist Sturgill stated in an interview with About.com.

The group's first release, an EP entitled Subhuman Empire, was released in July 2007 through Debello Recordings. In December 2007, Success Will Write Apocalypse Across the Sky signed a deal with German label Nuclear Blast. The band's full-length debut, The Grand Partition and the Abrogation of Idolatry, was produced, mixed and mastered by guitarist James Murphy, and released on April 3, 2009, in Europe and on May 5, 2009, in the United States.

The lyrical themes of Success Will Write Apocalypse Across the Sky, which were defined by Exclaim! magazine as "a big 'fuck you' to all of humanity," address topics like "wage slavery, psychological warfare, 'denial and contortion' of human rights, globalism, and eugenics". Vocalist John Collett cites authors such as H. P. Lovecraft, Mark Twain, Bram Stoker, and Ambrose Bierce as some of his lyrical influences.

== Members ==
=== Current members ===
- Ian Sturgill – guitars, backing vocals (2006–present)
- John Collett – lead vocals (2007–present)
- Jennifer Muse – samples (2008–present)
- Matt Simpson – bass (2008–present)
- Shaun De Leon – guitars (2012–present)

=== Former members ===
- JR Daniels – drums
- Aaron Haines – guitars
- Chris Woodall – bass
- Mike Petrak – drums
- Jesse Jolly – bass
- Pete Lamb – drums

=== Session and touring members ===
- Mike Heller – drums (2009)
- Sally Gates – guitar (2009)
- Angel Cotte – drums (2013)

== Discography ==
- Subhuman Empire EP (2007)
- The Grand Partition and the Abrogation of Idolatry (2009)
