= Tyrants Blood =

Canadian thrash/death metal band

Tyrants Blood are a thrash/death metal band from Vancouver, British Columbia, Canada.

== History ==
Tyrants Blood was created in 2005 by former members of black metal band Blasphemy, along with members of cult thrash bands Witches Hammer, Infernäl Mäjesty, Omega Crom, and grind act Abuse. In 2006, the band's self-titled first album was released.

In 2009, with new lead vocalist Brian Langley, who had recently left Infernäl Mäjesty, they released Crushing Onward into Oblivion, and in 2013 "Into the Kingdom of Graves". The fast pace of their later albums gained them a reputation as a "speed metal" band.

== Band members ==
- Brian Langley – vocals
- Vinnie Borden – bass and vocals
- Marco Banco – guitar
- Matt Modder – drums

=== Former members ===
- Tom Lewko – guitar (2006–2010)
- Andrew Russell – vocals (2006–2008)
- Shawn Darksoul – vocals (2006)
- Mike Wetherick – bass (2006)
- Kevin O'Driscoll – drums (2006–2007)

== Discography ==
- Tyrants Blood (full-length, 2006)
- Tyrannous Mutations of Sathanas (split, 2008)
- Prophecy (EP, 2008)
- Crushing Onward Into Oblivion (full-length, 2009)
- Into The Kingdom Of Graves (full-length, 2013)
