= Ghost Brigade (band) =

Finnish band

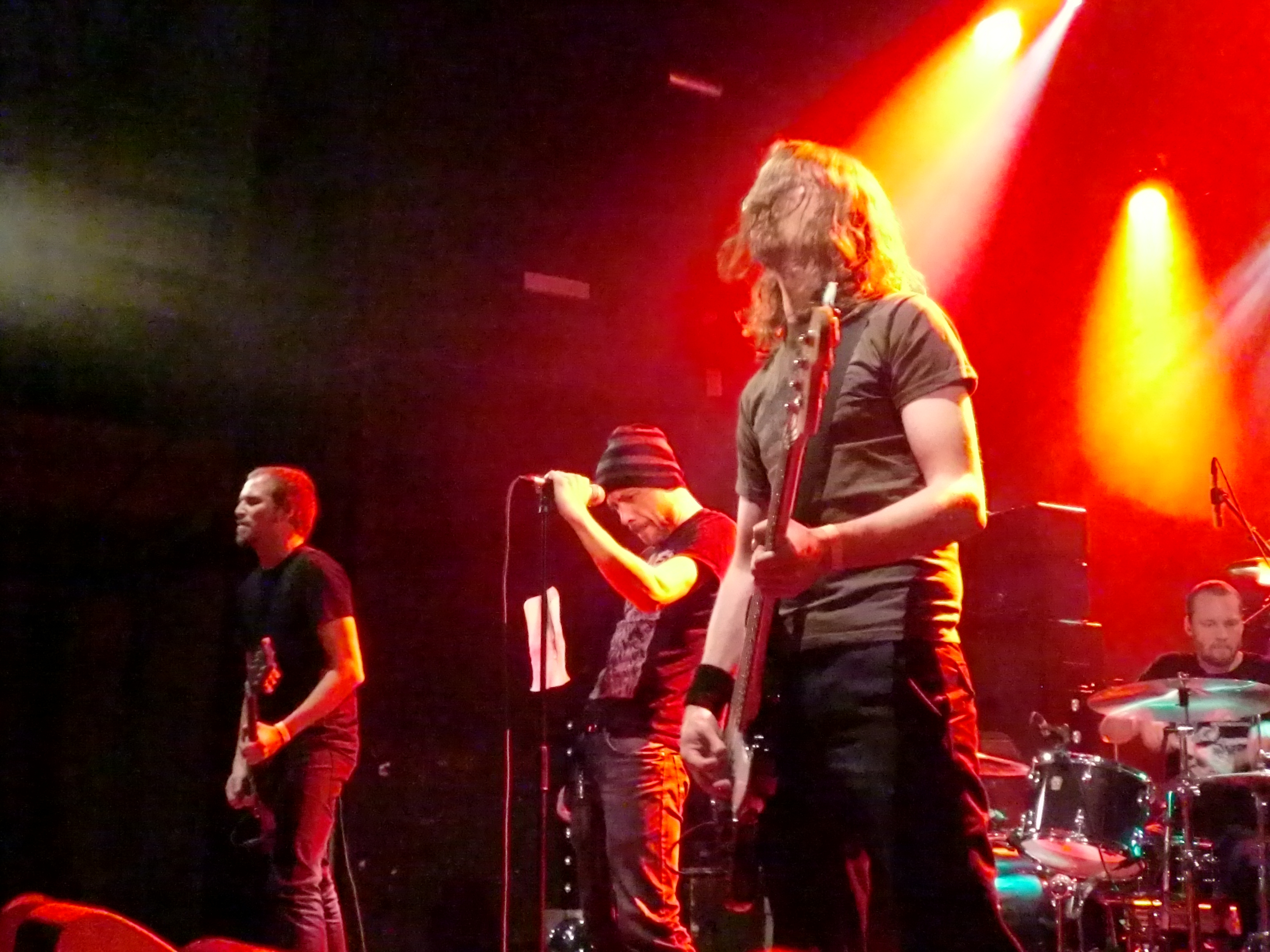
- Ghost Brigade at Tivoli (The Netherlands), 10 November 2009

Background information
- Origin: Jyväskylä, Finland
- Genres: Melodic death metal, doom metal, post-metal, alternative metal
- Years active: 2005–2020
- Label: Season of Mist
- Past members: Manne Ikonen; Tommi Kiviniemi; Wille Naukkarinen; Veli-Matti Suihkonen; Joni Saalamo; Joni Vanhanen; Janne Julin; Tapio Vartiainen
- Website: https://ghostbrigade.bandcamp.com/

Ghost Brigade were a six-piece alternative metal band from Finland, that formed in 2005 and disbanded in 2020.

== History ==
=== Formation and Guided By Fire (2007) ===
Former members of the stoner rock band Sunride (Wille Naukkarinen, Veli-Matti Suihkonen and Janne Julin) and Zerocharisma (Manne Ikonen and Tommi Kiviniemi) formed Ghost Brigade in 2005. They recorded four songs that were gathered in a demo, released in 2006. The following year, they started to record several songs, such as "Along The Barriers" and "Horns", which led to the band recording their first proper studio album, Guided By Fire, with Mikko Poikolainen. Season Of Mist released it on 17 September 2007 as a digital download, later reissued in 2012 in a clear vinyl edition. It was the band's first album to feature guest member Aleksi Munter, the keyboardist of melodic death metal band Swallow The Sun, and the only to feature Fredrik Nordin, vocalist of stoner metal band Dozer, on guest vocals.

The band toured with Insomnium in Finland to promote the album between April and October 2007.

=== Isolation Songs (2009–2010) ===
Two years after Guided By Fire, Ghost Brigade released their second album, Isolation Songs, on 3 August 2009 via Season Of Mist. Antti Malinen recorded and mixed the second album.

About this album, Wille Naukkarinen stated, "We had a few different working titles for this record but 'Isolation Songs' was the one that we collectively felt good about. I remember reading through the lyrics of this album just before we went to the studio in order to come up with an album title and the word 'isolation' came to mind several times. The songs themselves aren't directly about that at all but I think that having a feeling of being isolated has been an inspiration or a driving force to at least some of the content of these lyrics. And if you think about our songwriting process in general, Isolation Songs is probably the best possible title to characterize that as well. I, for example, have to be completely isolated from the outside world to write riffs, melodies and songs for Ghost Brigade; it just doesn't work any other way. We can't go to our rehearsal room and jam until we come up with something 'pretty cool.' This band digs deeper than that. And besides, Isolation Songs sounds like it's a title of a country album and that of course, is a big bonus. It was a lot of work to get this album done, it took almost two years to write these songs, but now that it's 100% ready I can only say that I feel privileged to be a member of GHOST BRIGADE. I have a strong feeling we have created something very special with 'Isolation Songs' and it is by far my personal favorite of all recordings I've ever been a part of. I hope people will enjoy these songs as much as we do once they get the chance to hear them."

After the release of Isolation Songs, the band opened for Amorphis during their 2010 tour in Europe.

=== Lineup changes, hiatus, disbandment and the birth of Ceresian Valot (2011–2020) ===
Ghost Brigade released their third studio album, Until Fear No Longer Defines Us, on 19 August 2011. The band played several European tours. One supporting Enslaved, another one supporting Paradise Lost, and also a co-headline tour with Insomnium. They headlined two European tours. The first was with Intronaut and A Storm Of Light as openers and another one with Talbot and Agrimonia.

In 2013, bassist Janne Julin left the band Joni Saalamo replaced him. The band acquired new permanent keyboardist Joni Vanhanen. This new lineup recorded their fourth studio album, IV: One with the Storm. Season of Mist released it on 7 November 2014. The band produced the album with Tuomas Kokko. In December of the following year, the band announced an indefinite hiatus in a Facebook post.

In 2019, bassist Tapio Vartiainen (Endstand, On A Solid Rock, Sons Of Aeon) replaced Joni Saalamo. On 7 November 2019, the band announced their reactivation and scheduled a concert at the Tanssisali Lutakko venue for 10 April 2020 with a second show on the 11th added later that month. Due to the COVID-19 pandemic, these shows were pushed back to August, and later cancelled. On 20 August 2020, the band announced their disbandment in a Facebook post.

After the break-up, Wille Naukkarinen, Veli-Matti Suihkonen, Joni Vanhanen and Tapio Vartiainen formed Ceresian Valot.

== Band members ==
Final line-up:

- Manne Ikonen – vocals
- Tommi Kiviniemi – rhythm guitar
- Wille Naukkarinen – lead guitar
- Veli-Matti Suihkonen – drums
- Tapio Vartiainen – bass
- Joni Vanhanen – keyboards

Former members:

- Janne Julin – bass
- Joni Saalamo – bass

Guest musicians:

- Aleksi Munter of Swallow The Sun – keyboards on Guided by Fire, Isolation Songs & Until Fear No Longer Defines Us
- Fredrik Nordin of Dozer – backing vocals on Guided by Fire

== Gallery ==
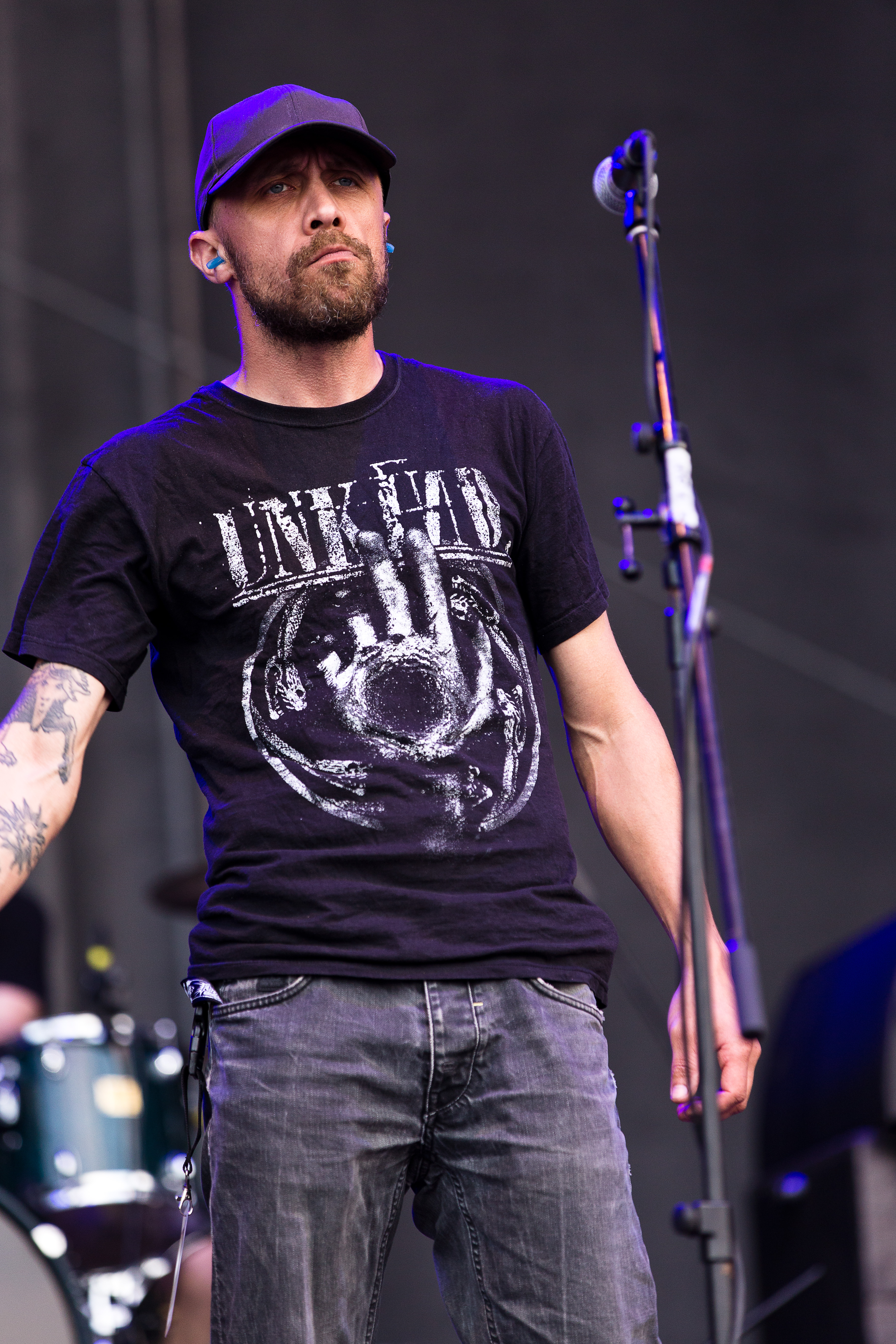
Manne Ikonen at Party.San Open Air 2015

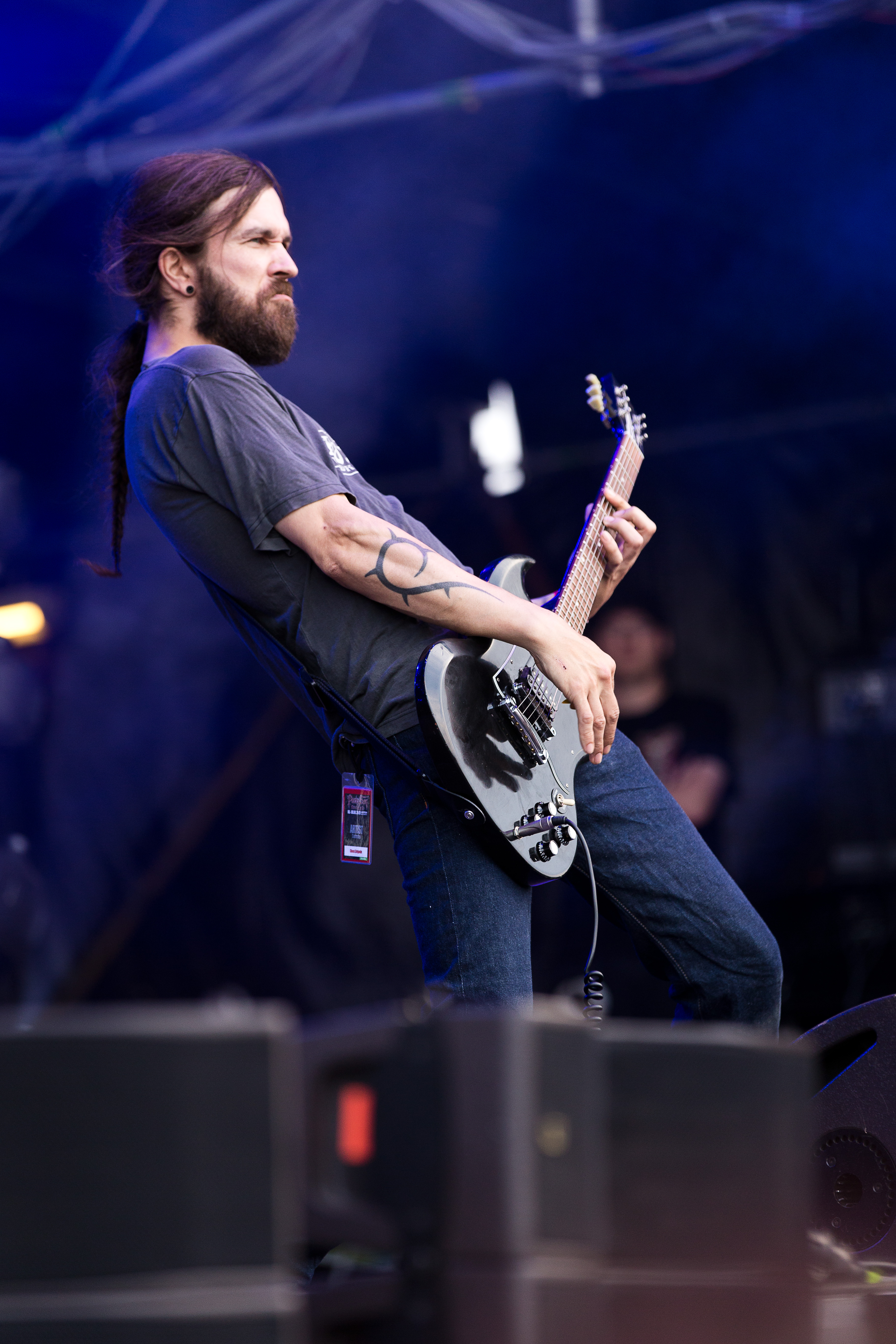
Tommi Kiviniemi 2015

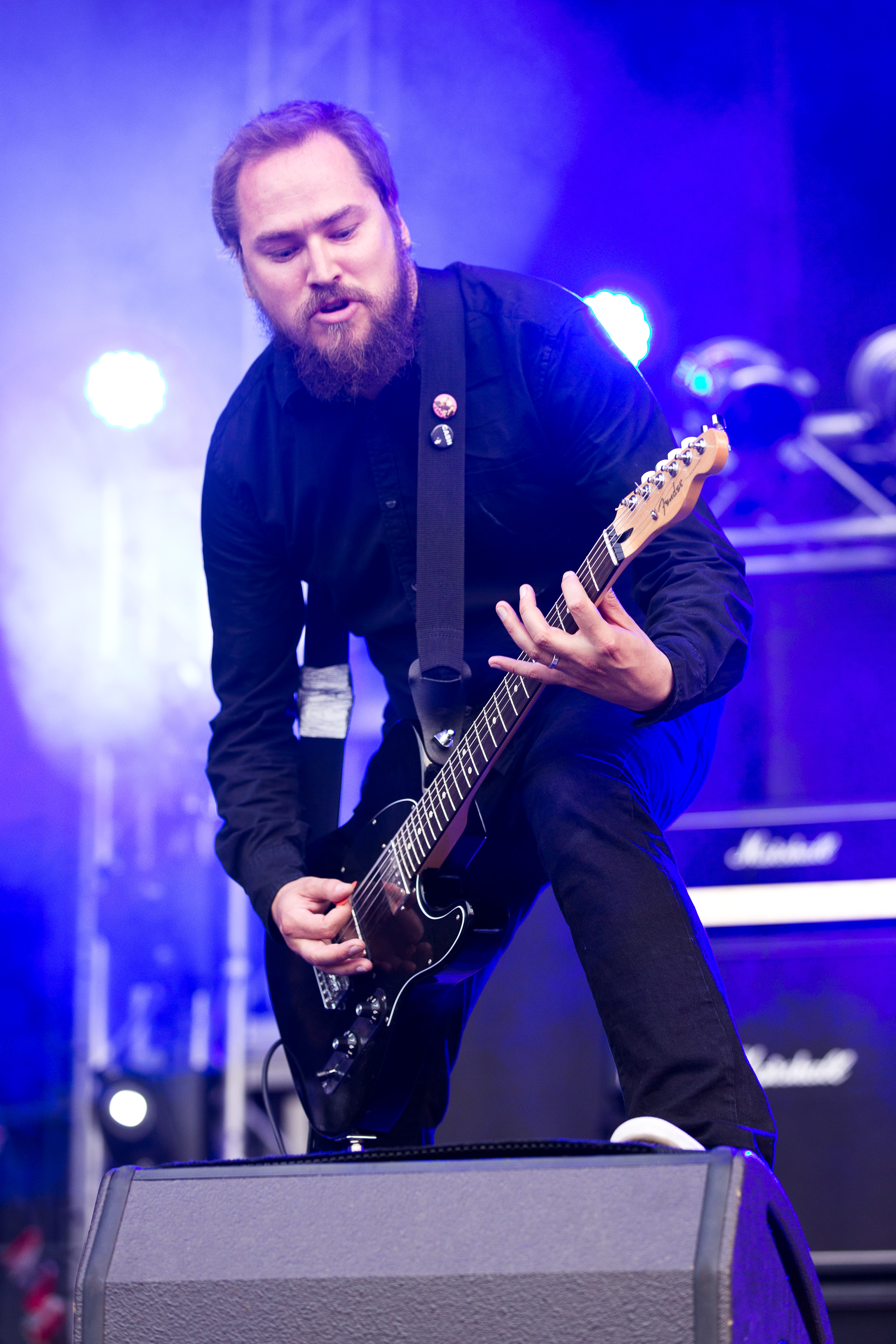
Wille Naukkarinen 2015

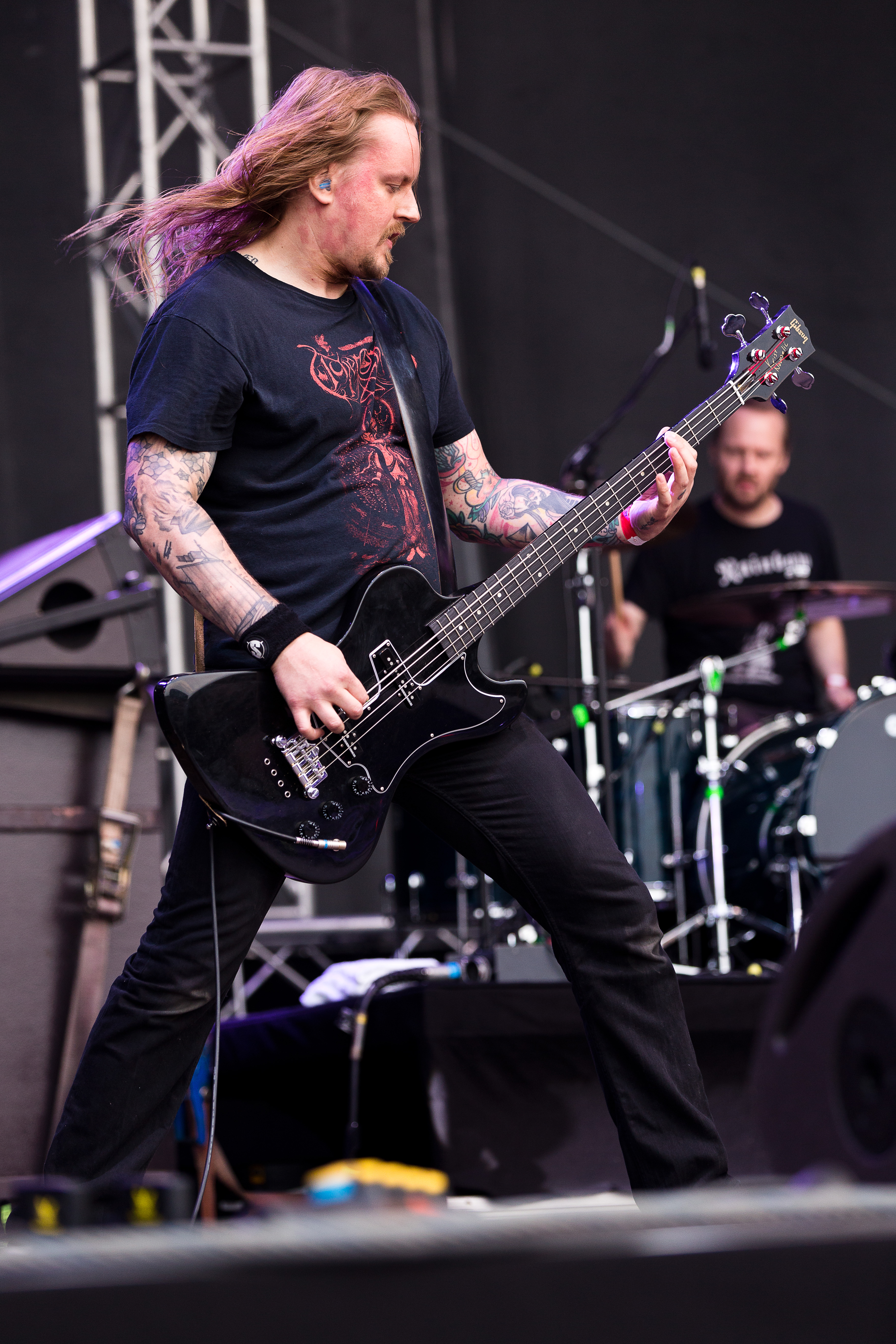
Joni Saalamo 2015

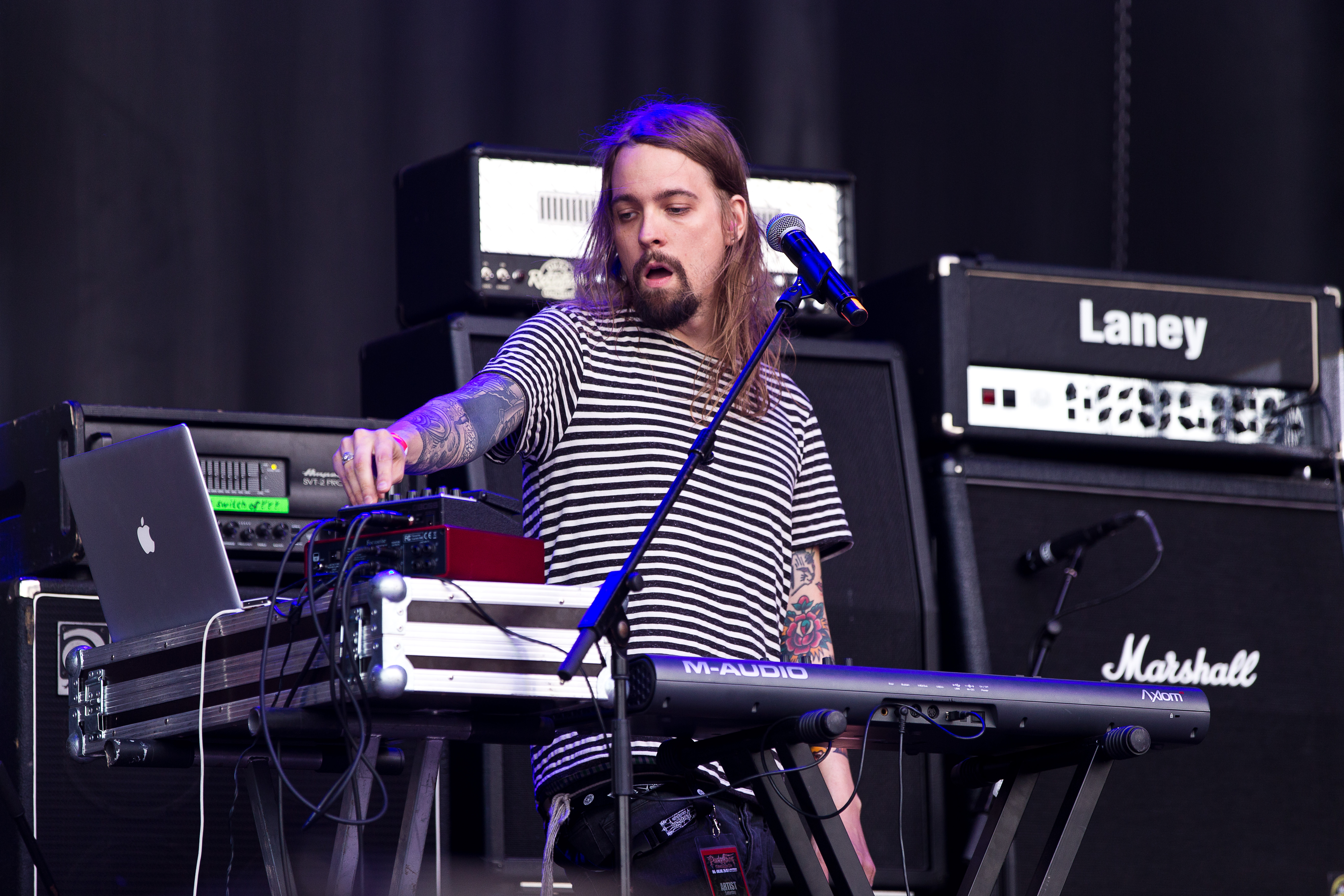
Joni Vanhanen 2015

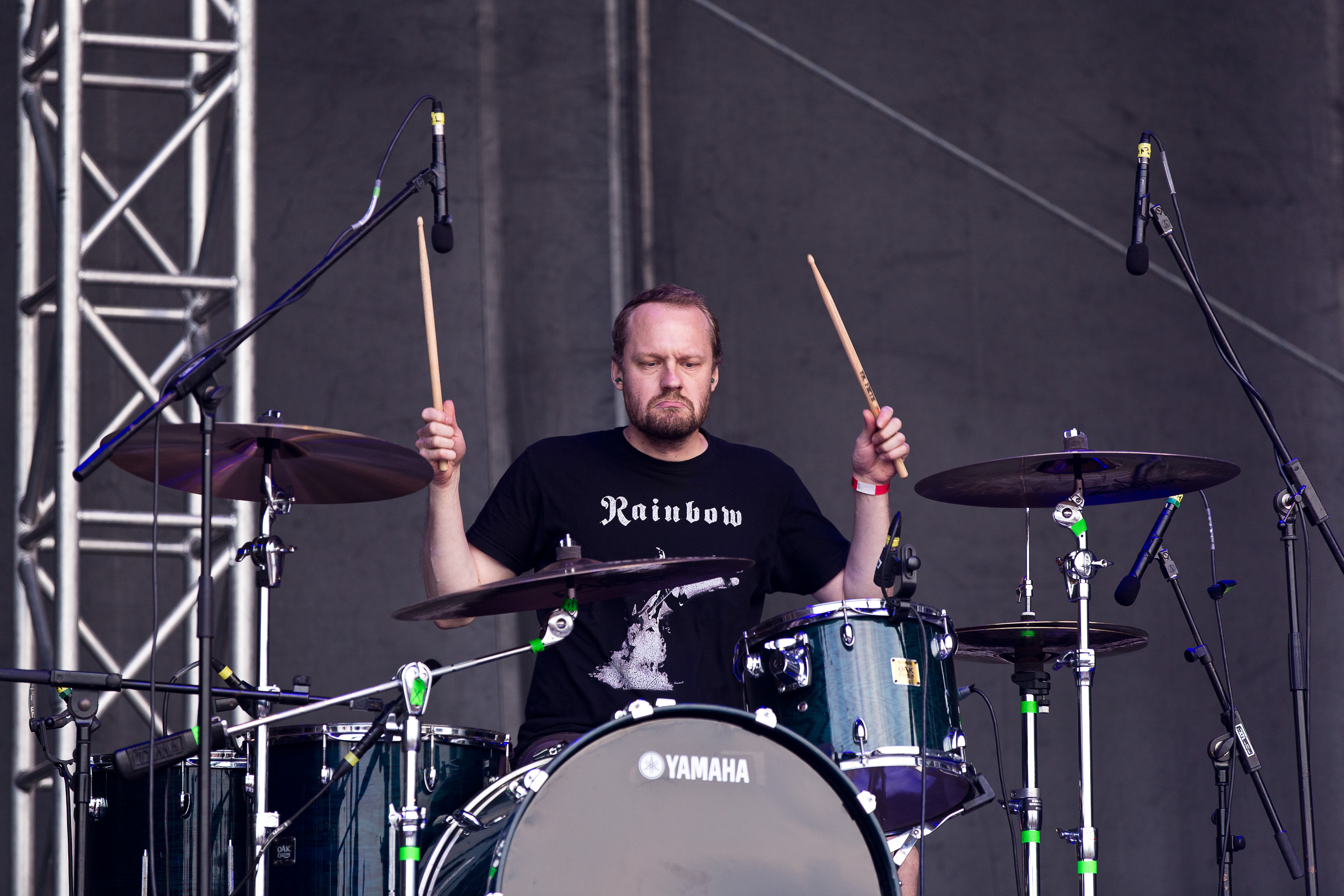
Veli-Matti Suihkonen 2015

== Discography ==
=== Studio albums ===
- Guided By Fire, 2007
- Isolation Songs, 2009
- Until Fear No Longer Defines Us, 2011
- IV - One With the Storm, 2014

=== Demos ===
- Demo, 2006
