= Lunatica =

Swiss symphonic metal band

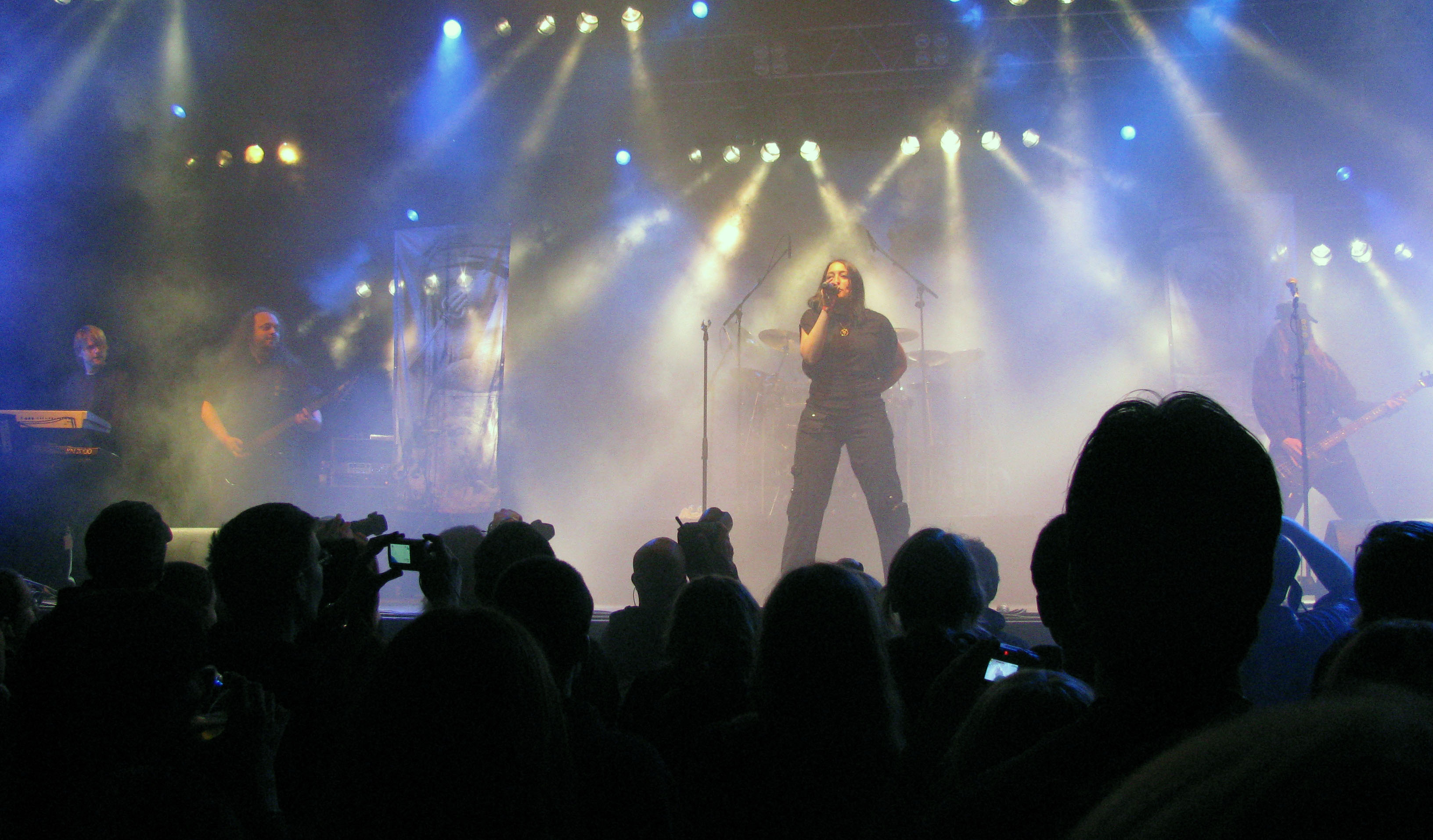
- Promo image of Lunatica.

Background information
- Origin: Suhr, Switzerland
- Genres: Symphonic metal Power metal
- Years active: 1998–2020
- Labels: Frontiers Records; Napalm Records
- Members: Andrea Dätwyler; Sandro D’Incau; Emilio MG Barrantes; Alex Seiberl; Marc Torretti; Ronnie Wolf
- Past members: Beat Brack; Ermes Di Prisco; André Leuenberger

Lunatica was a Swiss symphonic metal band, formed in Suhr in 1998.

== Biography ==
=== Formation ===
Founded by keyboardist Alex Seiberl and guitarist Sandro D'Incau, lead vocalist Andrea Dätwyler joined the band in 2001.

=== Atlantis ===
Their debut album Atlantis was released later that year. A series of concerts and festival appearances followed, and Lunatica was named "Best Newcomers" at the Swiss metal festival, Metaldayz.

=== Fables & Dreams ===
Their second album Fables & Dreams followed in February 2004, produced by Sascha Paeth, renowned for his work with numerous successful European acts. Fables & Dreams debuted at #13 on the Swiss Internet Charts.

=== The Edge of Infinity ===
Their third studio album The Edge of Infinity followed in August 2006.

In 2008, guitarist André Leuenberger left the band, and was replaced by Marc Torretti.

=== New Shores ===
Lunatica's fourth studio album New Shores was released in February 2009.

=== Return and upcoming fifth studio album ===
An as-yet untitled fifth album has been in production since 2010.

On 14 March 2019 the band shared a pre-production version of the upcoming song Luna on their SoundCloud site.

== Band members ==
=== Current ===
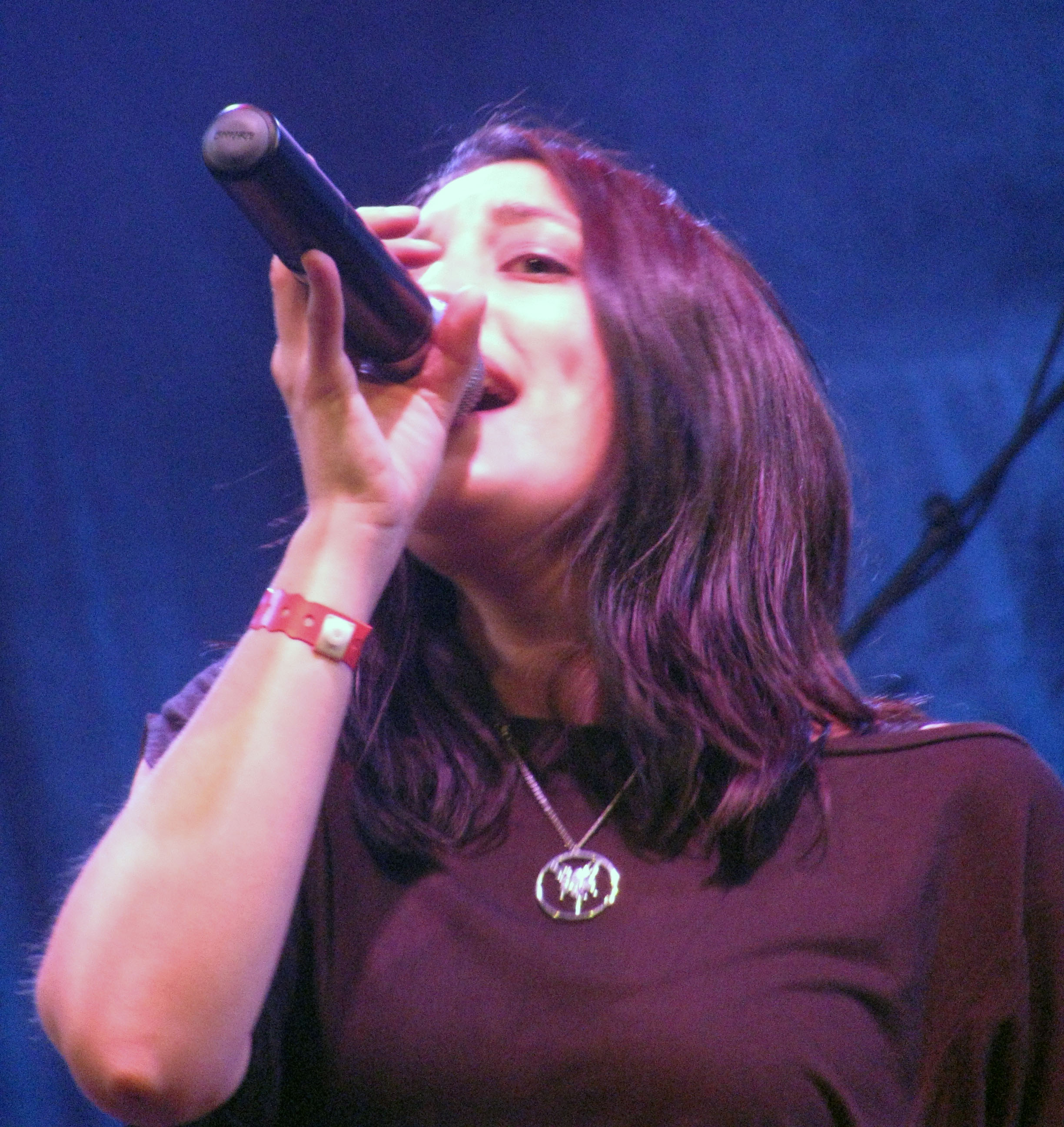
Andrea Dätwyler

- Sandro D’Incau - guitars (1998–present)
- Alex Seiberl - keyboards (1998–present)
- Andrea Dätwyler - vocals (2001–present)
- Emilio "MG" Barrantes - bass (2001–present)
- Ronnie Wolf - drums (2001–present)

=== Former ===
- Beat Brack - bass (1998–2001)
- Ermes Di Prisco - drums (1998–2001)
- André Leuenberger - guitars (2001–2008)
- Marc Torretti - guitars (2008–2009)
- Zoltan Daraban - guitars (2009–2012)

Timeline

== Discography ==
=== Studio albums ===
- Atlantis (2001)
- Fables & Dreams (2004)
- The Edge of Infinity (2006)
- New Shores (2009)

=== Singles ===
- Fable of Dreams (2004)
- Who You Are (2005)

=== Music videos ===
- Song for You (2007)
