= Mob Rules (band) =

German power metal band

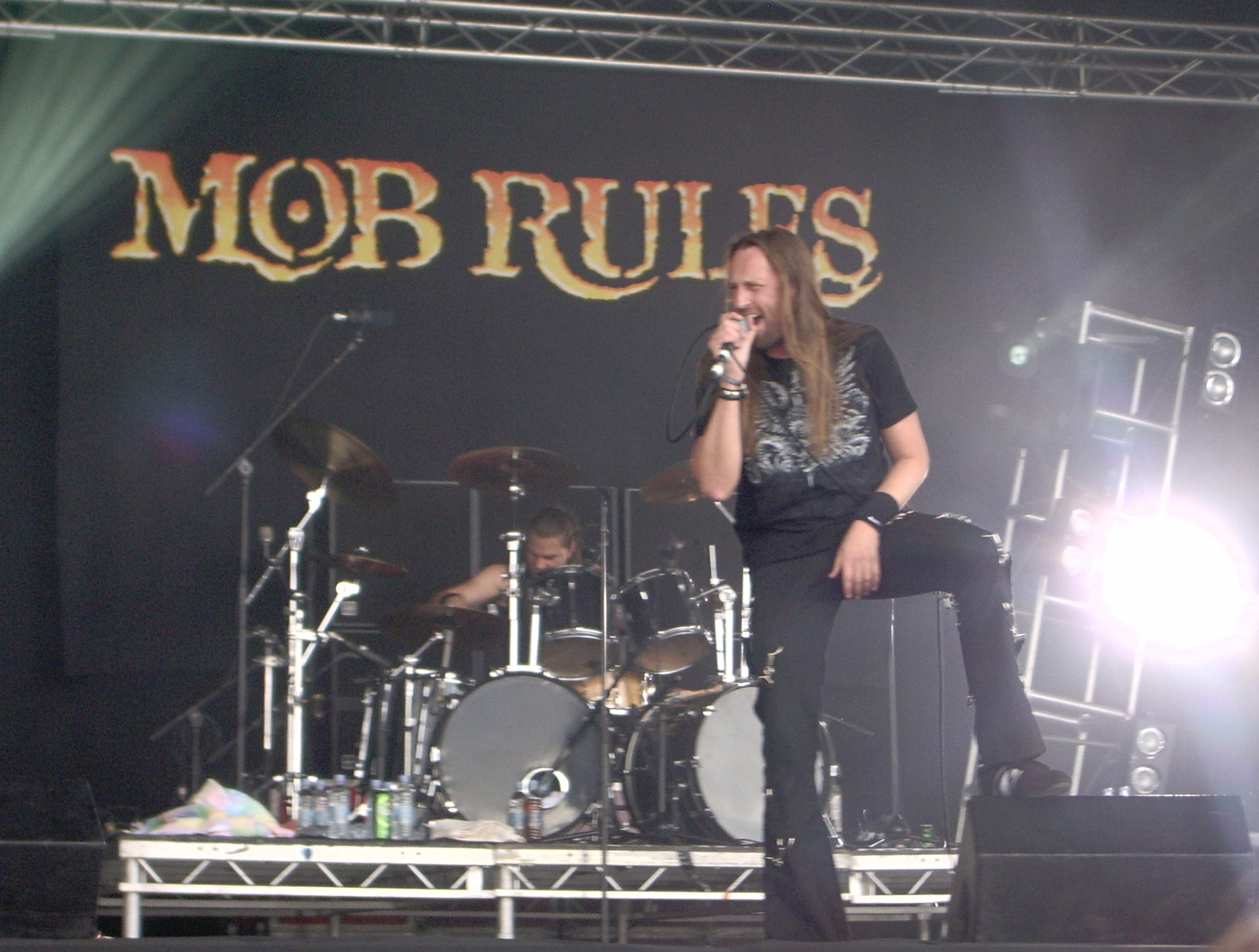
- Mob Rules performing in 2008

Background information
- Origin: Germany
- Genres: Power metal
- Years active: 1994–present
- Labels: Limb Music (1999 – 2002); SPV (2002 – 2009); AFM Records (2009 – present)
- Members: Klaus Dirks (vocals); Florian Dyszballs (guitar); Sven Lüdke (guitar); Markus Brinkmann (bass); Sebastian Schmidt (drums); Jan Christian Halfbrodt (Keyboard)
- Past members: Oliver Fuhlhage (guitar); Thorsten Plorin (bass); Arved Mannott (drums); Nikolas Fritz (drums); Sascha Onnen (Keyboard) Matthias Mineur (guitar); Sönke Janssen (guitar)

Mob Rules are a German power metal band. They were founded in 1994 by erstwhile Van Blanc guitarist Matthias Mineur and bassist Thorsten Plorin. Pulling in vocalist Klaus Dirks and drummer Arved Mannott, the quartet began to gig. Opening slots included shows with Pink Cream 69, C.I.T.A. and Crossroads.

During the spring of 1996, Mob Rules added second guitarist Oliver Fuhlhage and a self-financed mini album prompted a deal with Limb Music Productions for the March 1999 Savage Land. The reaction in Europe was encouraging and the band toured Germany on a co-headline jaunt with Ivory Tower. Other shows witnessed valuable support slots to Overkill and Scorpions as well as an appearance at the Wacken Open Air festival in 2000.

In 2000, the band released their second album Temple of Two Suns, Thomas Rettke of Heavens Gate and Susanne Möhle of Heavens Gate and Hyperchild providing backing vocals. Live work had the band crossing Europe in 2001 with Company of Snakes.

Mob Rules then returned to live action during July 2002 acting as support to Savatage, topping this activity off with an appearance at the Wacken Open Air festival. The band's third album arrived in September 2002 Hollowed Be Thy Name. Guests include Peavy Wagner of Rage on the track "How the Gypsy Was Born" and ex-Helloween guitarist Roland Grapow on both "All Above the Atmosphere" and "Way of the World".

Among the Gods, arrived in May 2004 through SPV. Guitarist Oliver Fuhlhage was replaced by Sven Lüdke of Murder One in October as the band geared up for European dates supporting Europe. The band recorded a live album and DVD, billed Signs of the Time LIVE, at a hometown gig at the Wilhelmshaven Pumpwerk.

In 2006, Markus Brinkmann replaced Thorsten Plorin, and their album Ethnolution A.D. was released in October through SPV. The band has then released several more albums including the latest one, Stories from the Verdant Vale, scheduled for release on 21 August 2026.

== Discography ==
Albums

- Savage Land (1999)
- Temple of Two Suns (2000)
- Hollowed Be Thy Name (2002)
- Among the Gods (2004)
- Ethnolution A.D. (2006)
- Radical Peace (2009)
- Cannibal Nation (2012)
- Timekeeper (2014)
- Tales from Beyond (2016)
- Beast Reborn (2018)
- Rise of the Ruler (2025)
- Stories from the Verdant Vale (2026)

Singles

- "Lord of Madness" (2002)
- "Black Rain" (2004)
- Ice & Fire (2012)
- My Kingdom Come (2013)

EPs

- Savage Land Pt. 1 (1996)
- Astral Hand (2009)

Live album

- Signs of the Time (2005)
