= Autumn (Dutch band) =

Dutch heavy rock band

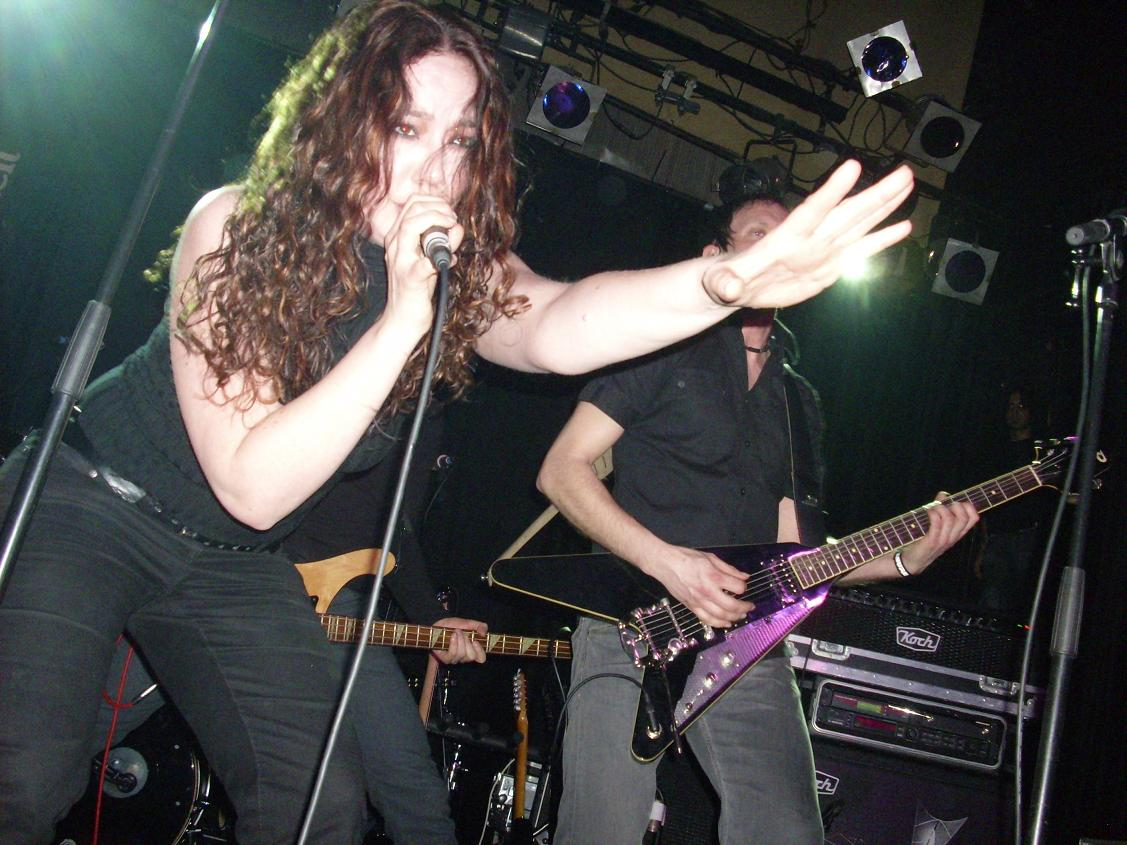
- Autumn in Madrid, February 2010

Background information
- Origin: Groningen, Netherlands
- Genres: Gothic metal, alternative metal
- Years active: 1995–present
- Labels: Metal Blade, Pink/Sony Music, The Electric Co./Universal Music
- Members: Jan Grijpstra; Jens van der Valk; Mats van der Valk; Jan Munnik; Maurice van der Es; Marjan Welman; Ronald Landa
- Past members: Meindert Sterk; Bert Ferweda; Hildebrand van de Woude; Menno Terpstra; Welmoed Veersma; Nienke de Jong; Jeroen Bakker; Jasper Koenders; Jerome Vrielink; Kevin Storm
- Website: www.autumn-band.com

Autumn is a Dutch female fronted heavy rock band formed in 1995.

== Members ==
Current members

- Jan Grijpstra – drums (1996–present)
- Jens van der Valk – guitars, backing vocals (2002–present)
- Mats van der Valk – guitars, backing vocals (2005–present)
- Jan Munnik – keyboards, programming (2006–present)
- Maurice van der Es – bass (2018–present)
- Marjan Welman – vocals (2008–present)
- Ronald Landa - guitars, backing vocals (2018–present)

Former members

- Meindert Sterk – bass, vocals (1995–2006)
- Bert Ferweda – guitars (1995–2001)
- Hildebrand van de Woude – drums (1995–1996)
- Menno Terpstra – keyboards (1996–2006)
- Welmoed Veersma – lead vocals, flute (1996–1999)
- Nienke de Jong – vocals (1999–2008)
- Jeroen Bakker – guitars (1999–2004)
- Jasper Koenders – guitars, flute (2004–2007)
- Jerome Vrielink – bass (2006–2012)
- Kevin Storm - bass (2012-2018)

== Discography ==
=== Studio albums ===
Title	Year	Label	NLD chart
When Lust Evokes the Curse	2002	Pink Records/Sony Music	—
Summer's End	2004	The Electric Co./Universal Music	60
My New Time	2007	Metal Blade Records	72
Altitude	2009	Metal Blade Records	94
Cold Comfort	2011	Metal Blade Records	—
Stacking Smoke	2019	Painted Bass Records	—

=== Other releases ===
Title	Year	Type	Label
Samhain	1997	demo	self-released
Gallery of Reality	2005	single	The Electric Co./Universal Music
