= Rumpelstiltskin Grinder =

American crossover thrash band

- Origin: Philadelphia, Pennsylvania, USA
- Genres: crossover thrash, hardcore punk
- Years active: 2002–2012
- Labels: Relapse Records, Candlelight Records
- Members: Melissa Moore; Shawn Riley; Pat Battaglia; Ryan Moll
- Past members: Eli Shaika; Mike Hrubovcak; Jason Sidote
- Website: rumpelstiltskingrinder.com (archived)

Rumpelstiltskin Grinder (or RsG) was a crossover thrash band from the U.S. state of Pennsylvania. Rumpelstiltskin Grinder contained former members of the metal bands Solace in the Shadows, Evil Divine and XXX Maniak. They first released their live album "Raped by Bears". After that, they released a single song split 7-inch entitled "Equipment Crusher" with Jumbo's Kill Crane on Red Candle Records. They then released a live CD-R entitled Raped By Bears-Live At The Dungeon 6/21/03. Their debut album Buried In The Front Yard was released on Relapse Records. Their second album entitled Living for Death, Destroying the Rest was released in January 2009. RsG played their first North American tour that year. Their third album Ghostmaker was released in 2012.

== Members ==
Current members

- Melissa Moore (rhythm guitar, vocals)
- Shawn Riley (bass, vocals)
- Pat Battaglia (drums, percussion)
- Ryan Moll (lead guitar)

Former members

- Eli Shaika (vocals)
- Mike Hrubovcak (vocals)
- Jason Sidote (vocals)

== Discography ==
=== Studio albums ===
- Buried in the Front Yard (2005)
- Living for Death, Destroying the Rest (2009)
- Ghostmaker (2012)

=== Live albums ===
- "Raped by Bears" (2003)

=== Split albums ===
- "Jumbo's Killcrane / Rumpelstiltskin Grinder" (2004)
- "Speed n' Spikes Vol. II" (2008)
- "Urine Trouble / Nothing Defeats the Skull" (2008)
- "Jason Gross / Guitar Rumplestiltskin Grinder" (2004)

=== Videography ===
- Stealing E.T. (music video) (2006)
- Nothing Defeats the Skull (music video) (2009)
