= Maroon (band) =

German band

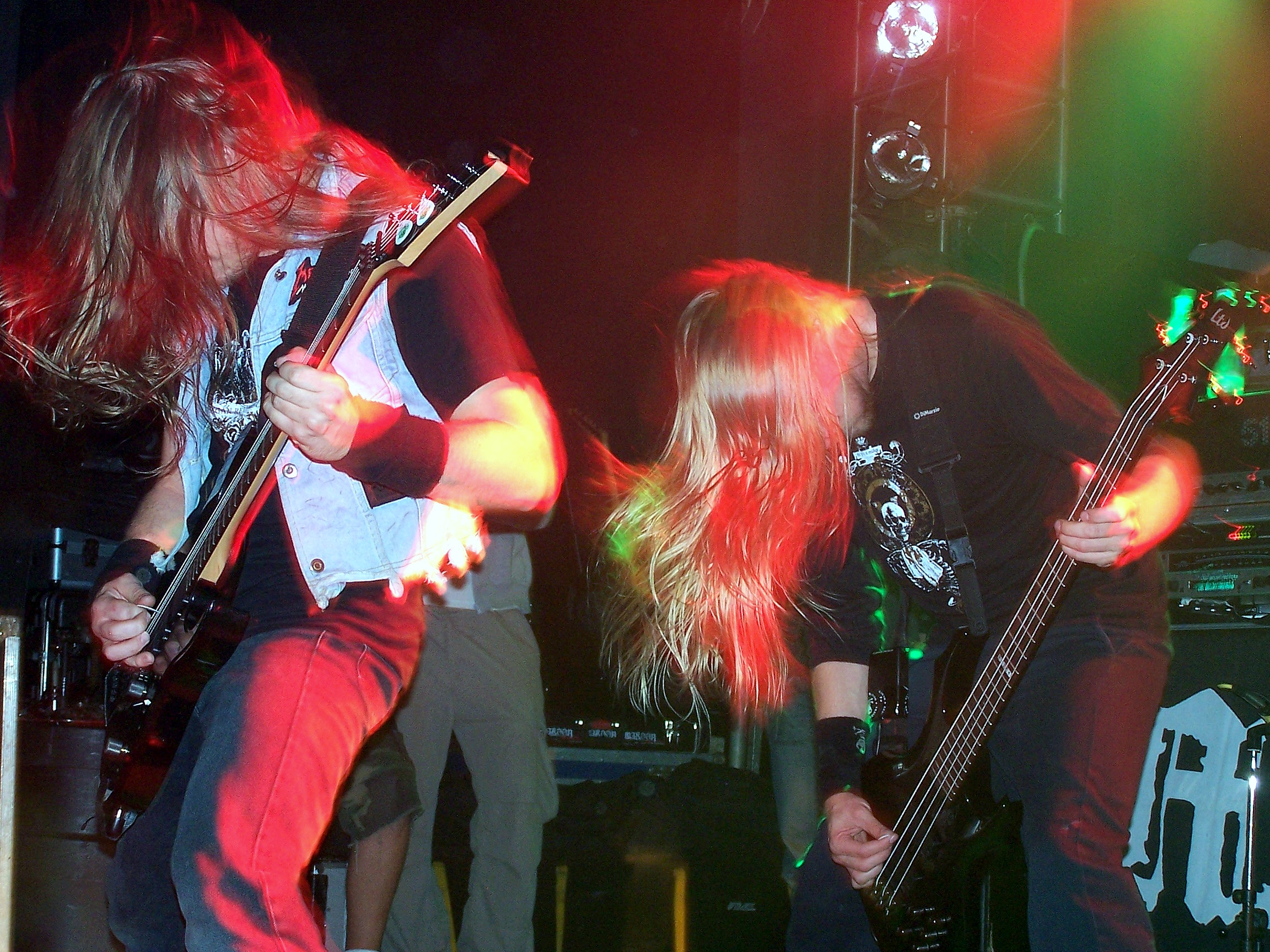
- Sebastian Rieche and Tom Eric Moraweck of Maroon

Background information
- Also known as: xMaroonx
- Origin: Nordhausen, Germany
- Genre: Metalcore
- Years active: 1998-2014
- Labels: Kerosene, Catalyst, Alveran, Century Media
- Members: Andre Moraweck; Sebastian Grund; Tom-Eric Moraweck; Steven Holl; Benjamin Kühnemund
- Past members: Marc Zech; Uwe Gruse; Nick Wachsmuth; Sebastian Rieche
- Website: www.maroon-hate.com

Maroon was a German metalcore band based in Nordhausen. They were formed in 1998.

== History ==
Maroon released a demo cassette in 1999 entitled The Initiate although all four songs can be found on later releases. Their first CD, Captive in the Room of the Conspirator, was recorded at Headquarters Studion in Berlin in spring 2000 and released that year on the (now-defunct) Kerosene Recordings label, featuring such songs as "The Solution' which strongly advocated a vegan lifestyle and support for animal liberation and earth liberation. The band began touring Europe, opening for hardcore acts including Earth Crisis and Morning Again, which were cited as major influences.

Later that year, Maroon released a 7" split with Absidia on the Crap Chords label, featuring the song "Wasted" from The Initiate. That winter the band went back to the studio to record a split album with Self Conquest entitled The Key, this time using 101 Studios, also in Berlin. Afterwards the band toured Europe and opened for bands including Heaven Shall Burn and Caliban.

In November 2001, Maroon entered Rape of Harmonies Studios to record their debut full-length, Antagonist, released on US vegan straight edge hardcore label Catalyst Records.

After some line-up changes Maroon switched labels to Alveran Records in 2003, who then re-released Antagonist. February 2004 saw the band at Denmark's Antfarm Studio recording a new full-length album entitled Endorsed by Hate. Following the recording, original guitarist Marc Zech left the band, and was replaced by Sebastian Rieche. The album was released in Europe in June, and between June and December 2004 Maroon played 60 shows across Europe, including major festivals such as With Full Force and Pressure Fest. In October, the band switched labels again, signing to Century Media Records. In early 2005, Century Media/Abacus released Endorsed by Hate in North America.

In March 2006, Century Media released Maroon's fourth full-length album When Worlds Collide. October 2007 saw the release of their second album for Century Media titled The Cold Heart of the Sun, and their latest, Order, was released on April 20, 2009.

After Sebastian Rieche and Nick Wachsmuth left in April 2011, the band was on a hold. Despite announcing a new album, they split up after a final tour in 2014.

Their songs "Wake up in Hell", "The Omega Suite Pt. II" and "At the Gates of Demise" were featured in the movie Zombie Strippers.

== Band members ==
=== Final Lineup ===
- Andre Moraweck – vocals (1998-2014)
- Sebastian Grund – guitar (1998-2014)
- Tom-Eric Moraweck – bass guitar (1998-2014)
- Steven Holl – guitar (2013-2014)
- Benjamin Kühnemund - drums (2013-2014)

Former members

- Uwe Gruse - drums (1998-2001)
- Marc Zech – guitar (1998-2005)
- Nick Wacksmuth – drums (2001-2011)
- Sebastian "Riechtor" Rieche – guitar (2005-2011)

Timeline

== Discography ==
Maroon discography
- Studio albums: 5
- Extended plays: 1
- Music videos: 3
- Demo albums: 1
- Split albums: 2

Studio albums

List of studio albums, with chart positions
Year	Album details	Peak chart positions	Notes
Year	Album details	GER	Notes
2002	Antagonist: Released: 2002; Label: Catalyst; Format: CD, digital download	—	Re-released through Century Media in 2005
2004	Endorsed by Hate: Released: 2004; Label: Alveran; Format: CD, digital download	—	Re-released through Century Media
2006	When Worlds Collide: Released: March 24, 2006; Label: Century Media; Format: CD, digital download	—	
2007	The Cold Heart of the Sun: Released: October 19, 2007; Label: Century Media; Format: CD, digital download	—	
2009	Order: Released: April 17, 2009; Label: Century Media; Format: CD, digital download	63	

EPs

Year	Album details
2000	Captive in the Room of the Conspirator: Released: 2000; Label: Kerosene; Format: CD

Split albums

Year	Album details
2001	The Key (with Selfconquest): Released: 2001; Label: Beniihana; Format: CD

Demo albums

Year	Album details
1999	The Initiate: Released: 1999; Label: independent; Format: Cassette

Music videos

Title	From the album
"Wake up in Hell"	When Worlds Collide
"(reach) The Sun"	The Cold Heart of the Sun
"Stay Brutal"	Order
