= Timeline (The Vision Bleak album) =

Timeline: An Introduction to The Vision Bleak

Compilation album by The Vision Bleak
- Released: 3 June 2016
- Genre: Gothic metal
- Label: Prophecy Productions
- Producer: Martin Koller

The Vision Bleak chronology
The Unknown (2016)	Timeline: An Introduction to The Vision Bleak (2016)

Timeline (subtitled An Introduction to The Vision Bleak) is the first compilation album by German gothic metal band The Vision Bleak. Their first compilation album ever, it was announced on 27 March 2016 and released on 3 June (the same release date of their sixth studio album, The Unknown) by Prophecy Productions. Intended to celebrate the band's 16th anniversary, and to introduce newcomers to their music, the album contains an assortment of songs ranging from their 2004 debut The Deathship Has a New Captain to their most recent release, 2016's The Unknown.

== Track listing ==
No.	Title	Original release	Length
1.	"Into the Unknown"	The Unknown (2016)	6:35
2.	"The Kindred of the Sunset"	The Unknown (2016)	4:55
3.	"From Wolf to Peacock"	The Unknown (2016)	7:11
4.	"The Wood Hag"	Witching Hour (2013)	3:57
5.	"Cannibal Witch"	Witching Hour (2013)	6:06
6.	"Descend into Maelstrom"	Set Sail to Mystery (2010)	5:26
7.	"I Dined with the Swans"	Set Sail to Mystery (2010)	4:19
8.	"By Our Brotherhood with Seth"	The Wolves Go Hunt Their Prey (2007)	5:08
9.	"The Black Pharaoh (Part III: The Vault of Nephren-Ka)"	The Wolves Go Hunt Their Prey (2007)	6:02
10.	"Kutulu!"	Carpathia: A Dramatic Poem (2005)	4:40
11.	"Carpathia"	Carpathia: A Dramatic Poem (2005)	5:15
12.	"The Charm Is Done"	Carpathia: A Dramatic Poem (2005)	9:38
13.	"Elizabeth Dane"	The Deathship Has a New Captain (2004)	5:07
14.	"The Lone Night Rider"	The Deathship Has a New Captain (2004)	5:04

== Personnel ==
- Ulf Theodor Schwadorf (Markus Stock) – vocals, guitars, bass, keyboards
- Allen B. Konstanz (Tobias Schönemann) – vocals, drums, keyboards
- Martin Koller – production
