= Club Single =

EP by The Vision Bleak
- Released: 23 July 2007
- Genre: Gothic metal, doom metal
- Length: 20:10
- Label: Prophecy Productions
- Producer: Martin Koller

The Vision Bleak chronology
Carpathia: A Dramatic Poem (2005)	Club Single (2007)	The Wolves Go Hunt Their Prey (2007)

Club Single is the third EP by German gothic metal band The Vision Bleak, released on 23 July 2007, through Prophecy Productions. It was intended to be a teaser for the band's then-upcoming studio album The Wolves Go Hunt Their Prey, released one month later on 31 August and features two tracks that would ultimately appear on the album, plus other two taken from their older releases Carpathia: A Dramatic Poem and The Deathship Has a New Captain. As evidenced by its title, the EP was given by Prophecy exclusively for members of its club; thus being, it is not available for sale, and is currently out of print.

== Track listing ==
All tracks are written by The Vision Bleak.

No.	Title	Length
1.	"By Our Brotherhood with Seth"	5:11
2.	"She-Wolf"	5:13
3.	"Kutulu!"	4:43
4.	"The Lone Night Rider"	5:03

== Personnel ==
=== The Vision Bleak ===
- Ulf Theodor Schwadorf (Markus Stock) – guitars, bass
- Allen B. Konstanz (Tobias Schönemann) – vocals, drums

=== Miscellaneous staff ===
- Martin Koller – production
