= Grave Human Genuine =

Studio album by Dark Suns
- Released: February 22, 2008
- Recorded: 2007
- Genre: Progressive metal
- Length: 58:04
- Label: Prophecy Productions

Dark Suns chronology
Existence (2005)	Grave Human Genuine (2008)	Orange (2011)

Professional ratings
Review scores
Source	Rating
Metal Storm	8/10 stars

Grave Human Genuine is the third studio album by German progressive metal band Dark Suns. It was released in a jewel- case packaging, and in a limited edition Digipak, with a bonus song. The album was released on 22 February 2008 through German record label Prophecy productions.

Andy Schmidt of Disillusion performed guest vocals on the song "Flies in Amber".

"The Chameleon Defect" was made into a music video, under the name "The Chameleon Conflict".

== Track listing ==
1. "Stampede" – 3:07
2. "Flies in Amber" – 9:52
3. "Thornchild" – 7:11
4. "Rapid Eye Moment" – 7:20
5. "Amphibian Halo" – 5:16
6. "The Chameleon Defect" – 6:08
7. "Free of You" – 8:42
8. "Papillon" – 10:28

=== Bonus tracks ===
9. "29" – 6:22

== Credits ==
- Niko Knappe – vocals, drums
- Maik Knappe – Guitars
- Torsten Wenzel – Guitars
- Kristoffer Gildenlöw – Bass
- Thomas Bremer – Keyboards
- Vurtox (Andy Schmidt) – Guest vocals on "Flies in Amber"
