= The Liberation =

Studio album by Disillusion
- Released: September 6, 2019
- Recorded: 2017–2018
- Genres: Progressive metal Melodic death metal
- Length: 57:40/62:35
- Label: Prophecy Productions
- Producer: Vurtox

Disillusion chronology
Gloria (2006)	The Liberation (2019)

Professional ratings
Review scores
Source	Rating
Metal Injection	9/10
Metal Storm	8.7/10
Sputnikmusic	1.5/5

The Liberation is the third full-length album by German metal band Disillusion. It was released on September 6, 2019, via Prophecy Productions. It is the band's first album in 13 years, due to creative, personal, and legal issues band members encountered since the release of Gloria.

== Background ==
In March 2017, Disillusion announced that they would begin writing a third album. To aide with the writing process, Andy Schmidt isolated himself to a small cabin in the woods somewhere in the Czech Republic for 3 weeks to work undisturbed on new songs. Simultaneously the band asked for fan support via Patreon to finance the production. The first goal – support for Andy – was reached within two days. The band then announced to complete the third album within 12 months, but later extended that deadline to another year as the band didn't want to feel rushed to provide their fans with an inadequate and incomplete experience. During this time, the band announced another line-up change. This time, Bass player, Benn Haugg, would be moving on to third guitar and the band announced 2 new members. Josh Saldanha, a drummer from Dubai, and Felix Tilemann who would be replacing Ben on the Bass.

== Track listing ==
No.	Title	Length
1.	"In Waking Hours"	2:04
2.	"Wintertide"	12:36
3.	"The Great Unknown"	5:51
4.	"A Shimmer in the Darkest Sea"	7:14
5.	"The Liberation"	11:55
6.	"Time to Let Go"	5:42
7.	"The Mountain"	12:18

Special edition bonus track
No.	Title	Length
8.	"Between"	4:55

== Personnel ==
- Vurtox (Andy Schmidt) − vocals, guitars, bass, keyboards
- Sebastian Hupfer − guitars
- Ben Haugg − guitars, bass
- Felix Tilemann − bass
- Josh Saldanha − drums
