= Nicht um zu sterben =

Nicht Um Zu Sterben

Studio album by Dornenreich
- Released: February 1998
- Recorded: September 1997
- Studio: CCP-Studio
- Genre: Melodic black metal
- Length: 43:38
- Labels: CCP Records, Prophecy Productions
- Producer: Claus Prellinger

Dornenreich chronology
Mein flügelschlag (1997)	Nicht Um Zu Sterben (1998)	Bitter ist's dem Tod zu dienen (1999)

Nicht um zu sterben (translation: Not in Order to Die) is the debut studio album by Austrian melodic black metal band Dornenreich. The album was recorded in four days during September 1997 at CCP Studios. It was re-released through Prophecy Productions in 2003. Only the re-release contains the full, uncut booklet.

== Track listing ==
1. "Hasses Freigang" (translation: "Hatred's Free Roaming") - 5:50
2. "In die Nacht" (translation: "Into the Night") - 6:47
3. "Verlorenes gefunden, Gefundenes empfunden" (translation: "Lost Things Found, Found Things Felt") - 3:33
4. "Schlaflos träumend" (translation: "Sleeplessly Dreaming") - 4:43
5. "Im flatternden Schleier der Vergänglichkeit" (translation: "In the Fluttering Veil of Perishability") - 4:52
6. "Und wie ein Kind in deiner hand" (translation: "And Like a Child in Your Hand") - 9:22
7. "Durch die Schluchten der Kälte" (translation: "Through the Gorges of Coldness") - 6:06
8. "Hofesfest" (translation: "Court Festival") - 2:25

== Personnel ==
Adapted from Discogs.

- Eviga - harsh vocals, acoustic guitar, keyboard, bass guitar
- Dragomir - guitar, drums, soprano flute
- Dunkelkind - guitar, keyboard, clean vocals
- Claus Prellinger - producing, mixing
- Cindi - photography
