= Swanlike =

Studio album by Dark Suns
- Released: 2002
- Recorded: 2001–2002
- Genre: Progressive metal Death/doom
- Length: 62:08
- Label: Prophecy Productions

Dark Suns chronology
Suffering the Psychopathic Results of Daily Blasphemy EP (1999)	Swanlike (2002)	Existence (2005)

Professional ratings
Review scores
Source	Rating
Allmusic	4/5 stars

Swanlike is the first album by German progressive metal band Dark Suns. It is their only album to employ death vocals. It was originally self-released, but on February 21, 2005, it was re-released through Prophecy Productions, with a bonus track. The bonus track, "Suffering", was a rewritten version of the band's 1999 demo, Suffering the Psychopathic Results of Daily Blasphemy.

== Track listing ==
No.	Title	Length
1.	"Swanlike"	11:31
2.	"Infiltration"	5:35
3.	"The Sun Beyond Your Eden"	8:52
4.	"Virtuous Dilemma"	4:51
5.	"Inside Final Dreams"	8:19
6.	"The Neverending"	5:27
7.	"In Silent Harmony II"	3:09
8.	"Suffering" (Bonus track)	14:24
Total length:		62:08

== Credits ==
- Niko Knappe - vocals, drums
- Maik Knappe - Guitars
- Torsten Wenzel - Guitars
- Christoph Bormann - Bass
- Thomas Bremer - keyboards
