= Wanderlust (Finnr's Cane album) =

Studio album by Finnr's Cane
- Released: 2010
- Studio: Sardonic Moon Studio
- Genre: Black metal, atmospheric black metal, doom metal
- Length: 47:36
- Label: Frostscald Records

Finnr's Cane chronology
Wanderlust (2010)	A Portrait Painted by the Sun (2013)

Prophecy Productions 2011 re-release

Wanderlust is the debut studio album by Canadian atmospheric black metal band Finnr's Cane. It was released in 2010 by Frostscald Records and re-released in 2011 by Prophecy Productions. The re-release includes a demo version of the song Snowfall, one of the first tracks composed by the band.

The album was recorded by The Bard at Sardonic Moon Studio in Sudbury, Ontario, Canada. Wanderlust has been compared to the music of Agalloch, Wolves in the Throne Room, and early Ulver, while maintaining a sound unique to Finnr's Cane.

== Track listing ==
No.	Title	Length
1.	"The Healer"	3:00
2.	"Snowfall"	4:51
3.	"A Winter for Shut-Ins"	6:14
4.	"The Lost Traveller"	6:29
5.	"Glassice"	8:21
6.	"The Hope for Spring"	6:03
7.	"Eternal"	7:03
8.	"House of Memory"	6:15
9.	"Snowfall (demo 2008) (Prophecy Productions 2011 re-release only)"	4:43

== Personnel ==
- The Peasant – Drums
- The Slave – Cello, synth
- The Bard – Guitar, vocals

2011 re-release:

- Benjamin König – cover art and layout
- Jeremey Swanson – photography
- Trey Corikern – photography
