= A Portrait Painted by the Sun =

Studio album by Finnr's Cane
- Released: 2013
- Recorded: Sardonic Moon Studio
- Genre: Black metal, atmospheric black metal, doom metal
- Length: 40:36
- Label: Prophecy Productions

Finnr's Cane chronology
Wanderlust (2010)	A Portrait Painted by the Sun (2013)	Elegy (2018)

A Portrait Painted by the Sun is the second studio album by Canadian atmospheric black metal band Finnr's Cane. It was released in 2013 by Prophecy Productions.

Like the band's debut album, Wanderlust, A Portrait Painted by the Sun was recorded by The Bard at Sardonic Moon Studio in Sudbury, Ontario, Canada, and the artwork and layout were handled by Benjamin König.

The cyclical nature of the seasons and the powerful sunshine of spring have been cited as thematic influences for the album. The digipak release features a two-panel photo of a piece of birch bark with etchings of the album's lyrics.

== Track listing ==
No.	Title	Length
1.	"This Old Oak"	5:40
2.	"Gallery Of Sun And Stars"	7:19
3.	"A Promise In Bare Branches"	5:33
4.	"Wind In The Wells"	3:18
5.	"A Great Storm"	6:51
6.	"Time Is A Face In The Sky"	5:41
7.	"Tao"	6:14

== Personnel ==
- The Peasant
- The Slave
- The Bard

Other

- Benjamin König – paintings and layout
- Dan and Alex – musical contributions
