= Songs of Good Taste =

EP by The Vision Bleak
- Released: 31 January 2001
- Genre: Gothic metal, doom metal
- Length: 17:51
- Label: Self-released

The Vision Bleak chronology
Songs of Good Taste (2001)	The Vision Bleak (2003)

Songs of Good Taste is the first EP by German gothic metal band The Vision Bleak, as well as their first official studio release overall. It was self-released by the band on 31 January 2001, and re-released by their long-time label Prophecy Productions on 1 January 2004.

== Track listing ==
All tracks are written by The Vision Bleak unless noted.

No.	Title	Length
1.	"To the Silent Water"	4:45
2.	"Nights in White Satin" (The Moody Blues cover)	5:01
3.	"The World Today"	4:18
4.	"The Sleepy Song"	3:55

== Personnel ==
=== The Vision Bleak ===
- Ulf Theodor Schwadorf (Markus Stock) – guitars, bass
- Allen B. Konstanz (Tobias Schönemann) – vocals, drums
