= The Fog =

1980 film directed by John Carpenter

- Theatrical release poster
- Directed by: John Carpenter
- Written by: John Carpenter; Debra Hill
- Produced by: Debra Hill
- Starring: Adrienne Barbeau; Jamie Lee Curtis; John Houseman; Janet Leigh; Hal Holbrook
- Cinematography: Dean Cundey
- Edited by: Charles Bornstein; Tommy Lee Wallace
- Music by: John Carpenter
- Production company: Debra Hill Productions
- Distributed by: AVCO Embassy Pictures
- Release date: February 1, 1980
- Running time: 90 minutes
- Country: United States
- Language: English
- Budget: $1.1 million
- Box office: $21.3 million

The Fog is a 1980 American supernatural horror film directed and scored by John Carpenter, who co-wrote it with its producer Debra Hill. It stars Adrienne Barbeau, Jamie Lee Curtis, Tom Atkins, Janet Leigh and Hal Holbrook. It tells the story of a strange, glowing fog that sweeps over a small coastal town in Northern California.

Filmed in the spring of 1979, The Fog was scheduled to be released at Christmas that year by independent studio AVCO Embassy Pictures, but its release date was delayed to February 1, 1980. The film divided critics upon release, receiving praise for its visuals and acting, and criticism for its structure and screenplay. Despite mixed reviews, the film grossed $21.3 million domestically.

The Fog contains themes of revenge and repressed corrupt historical events resurfacing in contemporary small-town America. In the years since its original release, it has established a cult following. A remake was released in 2005.

== Plot ==
On the eve of the centennial of the small coastal town of Antonio Bay in Northern California, old Mr. Machen tells ghost stories to children by a campfire on the beach. One story is about a clipper ship that crashed against the rocks nearby, causing all of its crew to drown after mistaking a campfire for a lighthouse while sailing through an unearthly fog. Machen finishes the story as midnight strikes and paranormal activity begins occurring around the town. Town priest, Father Patrick Malone, discovers his grandfather's diary when a stone spontaneously falls from a wall in the church, revealing a hidden cavity behind. The journal reveals that a century earlier, on April 21, 1880, the six founders of Antonio Bay, including Malone's grandfather, deliberately wrecked a clipper ship named the Elizabeth Dane, so that its wealthy, leprosy-afflicted owner, Blake, would not establish a leper colony nearby. The conspirators used the gold plundered from the ship to establish the town.

Meanwhile, out at sea, a strange, glowing fog envelops a fishermen's trawler. The fog brings with it the Elizabeth Dane, carrying the vengeful revenants of Blake and his crew, who kill the three fishermen. The following morning, local radio DJ Stevie Wayne is given a piece of driftwood by her son Andy, who found it on the beach. It is inscribed with the word "DANE". Stevie carries it to the lighthouse, where she broadcasts her radio show. As she is listening to music on a cassette, the driftwood begins to seep water. As the water touches her cassette player, a man's voice is inexplicably heard on the tape, vowing revenge, and the words "6 must die" appear on the wood before it bursts into flames. Stevie extinguishes the fire and sees that the wood once again reads "DANE" and the tape is playing normally.

Town resident Nick Castle and hitchhiker Elizabeth Solley find the lost fishing trawler adrift and the corpse of one of the fishermen. Later, while Elizabeth is in the autopsy room alone, the fisherman's corpse briefly comes to life and accosts her before collapsing. Nick and coroner Dr. Phibes see that the now lifeless corpse has carved the number "3" on the floor with a scalpel. That evening, as the town begins its celebrations, local weatherman Dan O'Bannon is killed by the revenants at the weather station. The fog has returned and starts moving inland, disrupting the town's telephone and power lines. Using a backup electric generator, Stevie begs her listeners to go to her house and save her son. The revenants kill her son's babysitter, but Nick and Elizabeth rescue Andy.

Stevie advises her listeners to head to the town's church, but then finds herself trapped and under siege by the revenants when the fog envelops her lighthouse. Seeking refuge inside the church, a group of townsfolk finds a large gold cross in the wall cavity, fashioned from the remaining stolen gold from the Elizabeth Dane, just as the fog begins to envelop the church and the revenants begin their attack. Malone understands that the revenants have returned to take six lives to match the six original conspirators, and feels guilty that his ancestor was one of them. He offers the gold and himself in exchange for sparing the others. Blake's revenant seizes the gold cross, and he and his crew disappear in a blinding flash of light as the fog miraculously vanishes. Stevie, now alone again at the lighthouse, warns her listeners that the fog could come again and instructs any ships that can hear her to keep an eye out for it.

After everyone leaves the church, Malone remains inside and wonders why he was spared, given that there were five deaths. The fog then reappears along with the revenants, and Blake decapitates Malone.

== Cast ==
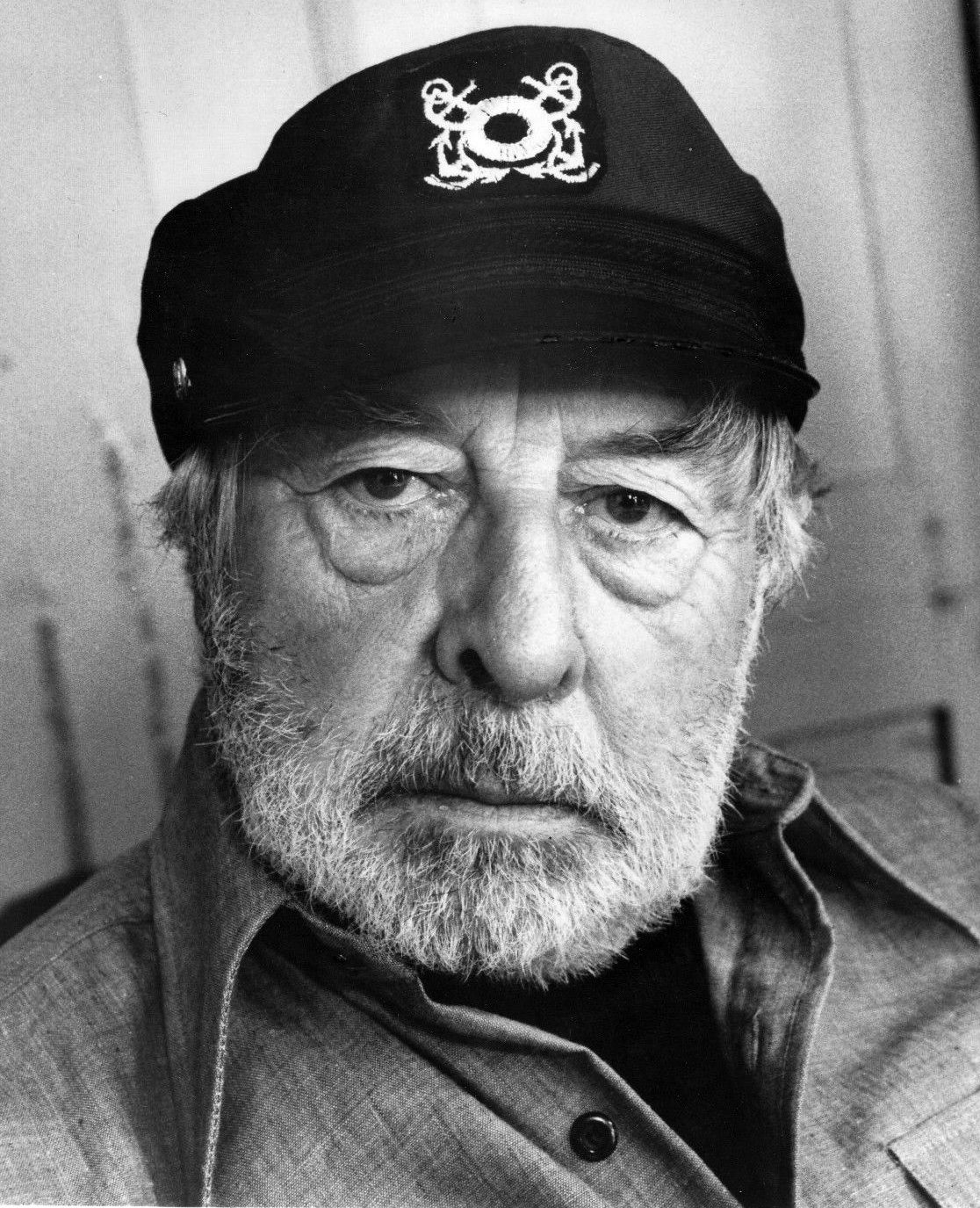
John Houseman as Mr. Machen in The Fog

=== Starring ===
- Adrienne Barbeau as Stevie Wayne
- Jamie Lee Curtis as Elizabeth Solley
- Janet Leigh as Kathy Williams
- Hal Holbrook as Father Patrick Malone
- Tom Atkins as Nicholas "Nick" Castle

==== Also starring ====
- James Canning as Dick Baxter
- Charles Cyphers as Dan O'Bannon / Dan the Weather Man
- Nancy Loomis as Sandy Fadel
- Ty Mitchell as Andrew "Andy" Wayne

==== Special appearance ====
- John Houseman as Mr. Machen

==== Additional roles ====
- John F. Goff as Al Williams
- George Buck Flower as Tommy Wallace
- Regina Waldon as Mrs. Kobritz
- Darwin Joston as Dr. Phibes
- Rob Bottin as Blake
- John Carpenter as Bennett Tramer (uncredited)

== Themes and interpretations ==
The Fog's central themes are revenge and the resurfacing of "repressed past events" in small-town America, as it focuses on the supernatural vengeance inflicted on the residents of a community that has prospered from looted salvage. William Fischer of Collider describes the film as one preoccupied with "an all-American town getting ready to celebrate its founding, a founding marred by a dark crime. When Father Patrick Malone discovers the horrible truth and brings it to the attention of Mayor Kathy Williams, she shrugs it off and dismisses any impact or introspection it might cast over the centennial. It was so long ago, she reasons, and what is there to do about it? And she has a point; there's no changing the past, and at a certain distance, there's no rectifying it."

Writer Peter Hutchings notes that, while the film contains these implicit themes, that Carpenter is "more interested in conjuring up a sinister atmosphere than he is in exploring some of the social ramifications of such a story".

== Production ==
=== Development ===
The initial inspiration for The Fog came to Carpenter when he and his collaborator and then-girlfriend, Debra Hill, were promoting their film Assault on Precinct 13 (1976) in England; the two visited Stonehenge during the trip, where they witnessed an eerie fog rolling over the landscape from a distance. Carpenter stated that he drew additional inspiration for the story from the British film The Trollenberg Terror (1958), which dealt with monsters hiding in the clouds.

In the DVD audio commentary for the film, Carpenter noted that the story of the deliberate wreckage of a ship and its subsequent plundering was based on an actual event (the wrecking of the Frolic) that took place in the 19th century near Fort Bragg, California (this event was portrayed more directly in the 1975 Tom Laughlin film, The Master Gunfighter). The premise also bears strong resemblances to Massimo Pupillo's 1965 Terror-Creatures from the Grave as well as the John Greenleaf Whittier poem The Wreck of the Palatine which appeared in The Atlantic Monthly in 1867, about the wreck of the ship Princess Augusta in 1738, at Block Island, within Rhode Island.

Carpenter named characters in the screenplay after people with whom he had collaborated on previous projects. Among them are Dan O'Bannon, a screenwriter who worked with Carpenter on Dark Star (1974); Nick Castle, who portrayed Michael Myers in Halloween; Tommy Wallace, an editor, sound designer and art designer who worked on Dark Star and Assault on Precinct 13, as well as several other subsequent projects. The babysitter in the film, Mrs. Kobritz, is named after Richard Kobritz, who produced Carpenter's 1978 television film Someone's Watching Me!.

Other references that are interwoven into the film include the name of the John Houseman character "Mr. Machen" (a reference to Welsh horror fantasist Arthur Machen); a radio report that mentions Arkham Reef; and the town's coroner Dr. Phibes was named after the titular character of the horror films starring Vincent Price from the early 1970s.

The Fog was part of Carpenter's two-picture deal with AVCO Embassy Pictures, along with Escape from New York (1981).

=== Casting ===
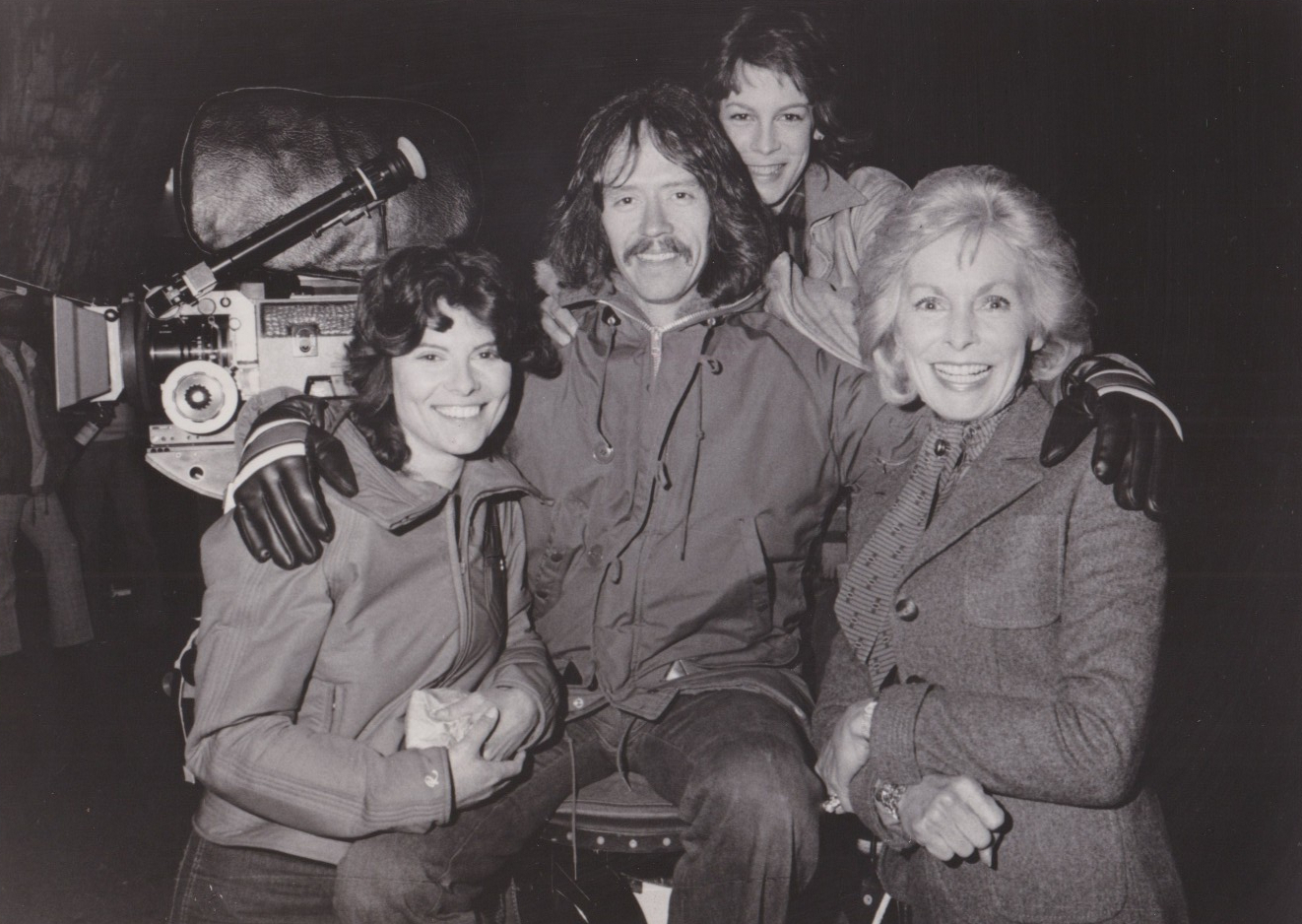
John Carpenter (center) with Adrienne Barbeau, Jamie Lee Curtis, and Janet Leigh during the filming of The Fog (1979)

Cast as the female lead was Adrienne Barbeau, Carpenter's wife, who had appeared in Carpenter's TV movie Someone's Watching Me! in 1978. This was her first feature film. Barbeau also appeared in Carpenter's next film, Escape from New York (1981).

Tom Atkins, a friend of Barbeau, was cast as Nick Castle. The Fog was Atkins' first appearance in a Carpenter film, and he also appeared in Carpenter's next film, Escape from New York (1981) as well as Halloween III: Season of the Witch (1982), which was produced and scored by Carpenter.

Jamie Lee Curtis, who was the main star of Carpenter's 1978 hit Halloween, appeared as Elizabeth. Commenting on the role and on appearing in another of Carpenter's films, she said: "That's what I love about John. He's letting me explore different aspects of myself. I'm spoiled rotten now. My next director is going to be almost a letdown." In a retrospective interview, Curtis stated that her part was written into the film by Carpenter, who felt sympathy for her after the success of Halloween had failed to lead to her obtaining other roles.

This was the first collaboration between Carpenter and character actor George Buck Flower, who would go on to appear in four more films directed by Carpenter: Escape from New York (1981), Starman (1984), They Live (1988) and Village of the Damned (1995).

=== Filming ===
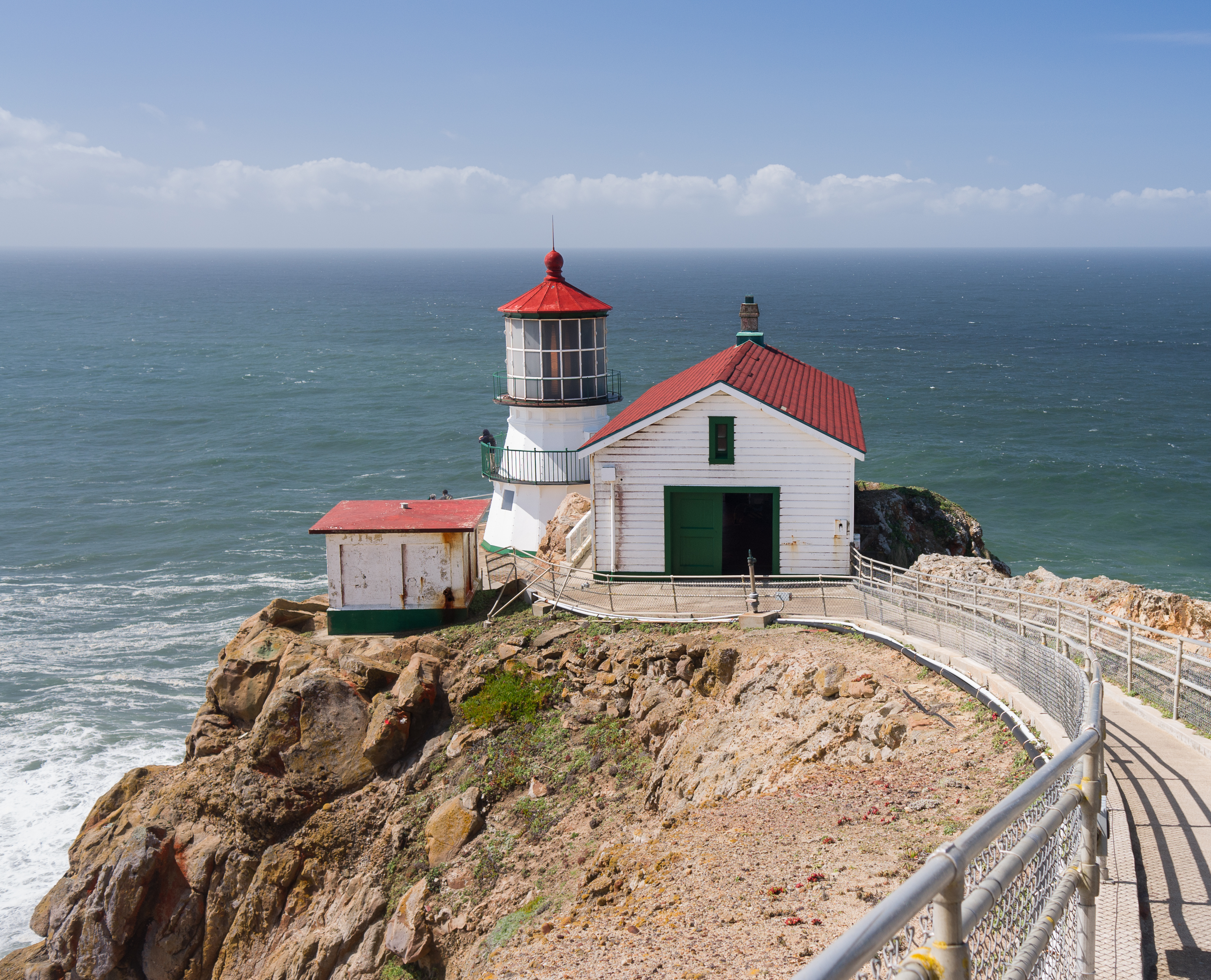
The Point Reyes Lighthouse is featured prominently in the film

Filming took place from April to May 1979 at Raleigh Studios in Hollywood, California (interior scenes) and on location at several other cities in California, including Point Reyes, Bolinas, Inverness, and the Episcopal Church of the Ascension in Sierra Madre. The original production budget was approximately $900,000.

The film was shot by cinematographer Dean Cundey, and Carpenter stated the appearance of the film was inspired by the Val Lewton-produced horror films I Walked with a Zombie (1943) and Isle of the Dead (1945), which he described as "very shadowy, all suggestion, and he has all sorts of melodrama going. I was a real fan of that sort of thing." Although a lower-budget independent film, Carpenter chose to shoot in the anamorphic 2.35:1 format to elevate its visual appearance.

=== Post-production ===
After viewing a rough cut of the film, Carpenter was dissatisfied with the results. Recalling the experience, Carpenter commented: "It was terrible. I had a movie that didn't work, and I knew it in my heart".

Carpenter subsequently added the prologue with Mr. Machen (John Houseman) telling ghost stories to fascinated children by a campfire. The scene was filmed on a soundstage rather than on location. Houseman played a similar role in the opening of the 1981 film Ghost Story. Carpenter added several other new scenes and re-shot others in order to make the film more comprehensible, more frightening and gorier. Among the additions were the sequence in which Curtis's character is approached by a walking-dead corpse in the morgue, as well as the finale in which Barbeau's character ascends to the roof of the lighthouse to escape the mariner ghosts.

Carpenter and Debra Hill said the necessity of a re-shoot became especially clear to them after they realized that The Fog would have to compete with horror films that had higher gore content. Approximately one-third of the finished film is the additional footage completed during reshoots. The reshoots increased the film's budget from $900,000 to $1.1 million.

== Music ==
Carpenter's musical score for The Fog features prominent synthesizer and elements of drone music, and was largely composed in the key of A minor. As the film progresses, its score shifts to the key of B major and features a flatter pitch. The score has been released on compact disc and vinyl in several different editions since the film's release.

== Release ==
=== Marketing ===
In addition to the final $1.1 million production budget, AVCO Embassy spent over $3 million solely on advertising, which included television and radio spots, print ads and even the placement of fog machines (costing £350 each) in the lobbies of selected theaters where the film was showing. A further undisclosed amount was spent on 600 prints of the film, 540 of which were distributed to American cinemas. Originally, the film was set for release during Christmas 1979, but AVCO Embassy president Bob Rehme opted to wait until February 1980, when there would be less major box office competition from other films and more theater screens available.

=== Box office ===
The film was given a staggered release in various cities by AVCO Embassy Pictures beginning February 1, 1980, before expanding to further locations later that month. Its theatrical run lasted a total of 152 weeks, and it ultimately grossed $21.3 million in the United States and Canada, with $11 million of that total being "rentals" (i.e. the share of the film's box office gross that goes to the film's distributors/studio).

=== Home media ===
The Fog has been released on various home video formats since the early 1980s: Magnetic Video released it on Betamax and VHS in the fall of 1980, Embassy Home Entertainment reissued the film again on VHS in 1985. MGM Home Entertainment released the film on VHS in 2000 before issuing a special edition DVD in August 2002. Another special edition DVD was released in Europe in 2004.

Scream Factory released the film on Blu-ray in July 2013, before reissuing it on 4K UHD on September 13, 2022, in both standard and limited SteelBook editions.

== Reception and legacy ==
=== Contemporaneous ===
Upon its original release, The Fog received mixed responses from film critics. Ernest Leogrande of the New York Daily News gave the film a middling two out of four-star review, praising the performances but writing that "Carpenter obviously is entranced by ghost stories, but he seems willing to sacrifice story for effect." Kevin Thomas of the Los Angeles Times similarly lauded the acting, and complimented the film as "an elegant and scary thriller of the supernatural that's far more impressive and satisfying than Carpenter's grisly and pointless (but profitable) Halloween."

The New York Times's Vincent Canby praised the film's visual elements, but felt it ultimately paled in comparison to Carpenter's Halloween, describing it as "neither a rewarding ghost story nor ... science-fiction, though it borrows freely from both genres ... Unlike Halloween, which was a model of straight-forward terror and carefully controlled suspense, The Fog is constructed of random diversions. There are too many story lines, which necessitate so much cross-cutting that no one sequence can ever build to a decent climax." In his 1980 review, Roger Ebert gave the film two out of four stars, commenting: "The movie's made with style and energy, but it needs a better villain. This isn't a great movie but it does show great promise from Carpenter." Similarly, Leonard Maltin rated the film 21/2-stars-out-of-4 and called it a "well-directed but obvious ghost story."

=== Reassessment ===
In the years following its release, The Fog has amassed a cult following, and later came to be considered, as Carpenter opined regarding his creation, "a minor horror classic," though he also stated it was not his favorite film due to re-shoots and low-production values. This is one of the reasons he agreed to the 2005 remake.

On the review aggregator website Rotten Tomatoes, 77% of 74 critics' reviews are positive, with an average rating of 6.6/10. The website's consensus reads: "A well-crafted return to horror for genre giant John Carpenter, The Fog rolls in and wraps viewers in suitably slow-building chills." Metacritic, which uses a weighted average, assigned the film a score of 55 out of 100, based on 11 critics, indicating "mixed or average" reviews.

In a 2002 review (for the DVD release of the film), Slant reviewer Ed Gonzalez gave the film 3.5 stars out of four, and stated that "Carpenter's use of 2.35:1 anamorphic widescreen is beyond legendary and his compositions evoke a town that may as well be the last remaining one on the face of the earth." In 2018, The Guardian called it "one of the director's most atmospheric, the shots of a wave-lashed cove and fog-choked headland making the town's impending reckoning almost poetic."

In the early 2010s, Time Out conducted a poll of over 100 authors, directors, actors and critics who have worked within the horror genre to vote for their top horror films. The Fog placed at number 77 on their top 100 list.

Zombiemania: 80 Movies to Die For author Arnold T. Blumberg wrote that the film was "a very effective small scale chiller" and "an attempt to capture the essence of a typical spooky American folktale while simultaneously paying homage to the EC Comics of the 1950s and the then very recent Italian zombie influx."

== Novelization ==
A novelization of the movie, written by Dennis Etchison, was published by Bantam Books in January 1980. The novel clarifies the implication in the film that the six who must die were not random, but descendants of the six original conspirators.

== Remake ==
In 2005, the film was remade under the direction of Rupert Wainwright with a screenplay by Cooper Layne and starring Tom Welling and Maggie Grace. Though based on Carpenter and Hill's original screenplay, the remake was made more in the vein of a "teen horror film" and given a PG-13 rating, whereas the original film was rated R. Green-lit by Revolution Studios with just eighteen pages of script written, the film was panned for its poor script and acting and has a Rotten Tomatoes rating of 4%.

== In other media ==
- German metal band The Vision Bleak covered the soundtrack's title song on their 2004 album The Deathship Has a New Captain. They titled the song "Elizabeth Dane" and overlaid the instrumental with Houseman's campfire ghost story as spoken word vocals.

== See also ==
- List of ghost films
- 1980 in film

== Sources ==
- Blumberg, Arnold (2006). Zombiemania: 80 Movies to Die For. Tolworth, England: Telos Publishing. ISBN 978-1-845-83003-8.
- Boulenger, Gilles (2003). John Carpenter: Prince of Darkness. Los Angeles, California: Silman-James Press. ISBN 978-1-879-50567-4.
- Conrich, Ian; Woods, David, eds. (2004). The Cinema of John Carpenter: The Technique of Terror. New York City, New York: Wallflower Press. ISBN 978-1-904-76414-4.
- Cumbow, Robert (2002). Order in the Universe: The Films of John Carpenter. Lanham, Maryland: Scarecrow Press. ISBN 978-0-585-38302-6.
- Donnelly, K. J. (2009). "Hearing Deep Seated Fears: John Carpenter's The Fog (1980)". In Lerner, Neil (ed.). Music in the Horror Film: Listening to Fear. New York City, New York: Routledge. pp. 152–167. ISBN 978-1-135-28044-4.
- Hutchings, Peter (2017). Historical Dictionary of Horror Cinema. Lanham, Maryland: Rowman & Littlefield. ISBN 978-1-538-10243-5.
- Maltin, Leonard (2013). 2014 Movie Guide. New York City, New York: Signet. ISBN 978-0-451-41810-4.
- Newman, Kim (2011). Nightmare Movies: Horror on Screen Since the 1960s (Revised ed.). London, England: Bloomsbury. ISBN 978-1-408-80503-9.
- Olson, Christopher J. (2018). 100 Greatest Cult Films. Lanham, Maryland: Rowman & Littlefield. ISBN 978-1-442-21104-9.
