= The Unknown (The Vision Bleak album) =

Studio album by The Vision Bleak
- Released: 3 June 2016
- Genre: Gothic metal
- Label: Prophecy Productions
- Producer: Martin Koller

The Vision Bleak chronology
The Kindred of the Sunset (2016)	The Unknown (2016)	Timeline (2016)

The Unknown is the sixth studio album by German gothic metal band The Vision Bleak, released on 3 June 2016 through Prophecy Productions. The album was announced by the band on their official Facebook page on 31 October 2015, and a teaser EP containing two tracks that eventually appeared in it, entitled The Kindred of the Sunset, came out on 25 March 2016. A deluxe two-CD box set, containing two bonus tracks, was also released.

The album's cover was provided by Dan Seagrave and was unveiled on 20 March 2016.

== Track listing ==
The album's track list was unveiled on 24 March 2016. "The Whine of the Cemetery Hound" and "The Kindred of the Sunset" originally appeared on the teaser EP The Kindred of the Sunset; a lyric video for the latter was uploaded to Prophecy's official YouTube channel on 24 March. On 31 May 2016, "From Wolf to Peacock" was released online (via Prophecy's YouTube channel). A music video for "Into the Unknown" was released on 14 June 2016.

All tracks are written by The Vision Bleak unless noted.

No.	Title	Length
1.	"Spirits of the Dead" (lyrics by Edgar Allan Poe)	1:19
2.	"From Wolf to Peacock"	7:11
3.	"The Kindred of the Sunset"	4:55
4.	"Into the Unknown"	6:35
5.	"Ancient Heart"	5:34
6.	"The Whine of the Cemetery Hound"	6:39
7.	"How Deep Lies Tartaros?"	5:40
8.	"Who May Oppose Me?" (instrumental)	2:49
9.	"The Fragrancy of Soil Unearthed"	7:35

Deluxe edition bonus tracks
No.	Title	Length
10.	"The Ghost in Me"	5:25
11.	"Luster Nocturnal"	5:23

=== Trivia ===
- The lyrics to "Spirits of the Dead" were taken from the first stanza of Edgar Allan Poe's poem of the same name.

== Personnel ==
- Ulf Theodor Schwadorf (Markus Stock) – vocals, guitars, bass, keyboards
- Allen B. Konstanz (Tobias Schönemann) – vocals, drums, keyboards
- Martin Koller – production
- Dan Seagrave – cover art
- Łukasz Jaszak – photography
