= The Vision Bleak (EP) =

EP by The Vision Bleak
- Released: 20 August 2003
- Genre: Gothic metal, doom metal
- Length: 10:04
- Label: Prophecy Productions
- Producer: Martin Koller

The Vision Bleak chronology
Songs of Good Taste (2001)	The Vision Bleak (2003)	The Deathship Has a New Captain (2004)

The Vision Bleak is the second EP by German gothic metal band The Vision Bleak. It was released through Prophecy Productions on 20 August 2003, to serve as a teaser for their then-upcoming debut studio album, The Deathship Has a New Captain. It contains two early versions of tracks that would ultimately appear on the album, "The Lone Night Rider" and "Elizabeth Dane".

== Track listing ==
All tracks are written by The Vision Bleak.

No.	Title	Length
1.	"The Lone Night Rider"	5:02
2.	"Elizabeth Dane"	5:02

== Personnel ==
=== The Vision Bleak ===
- Ulf Theodor Schwadorf (Markus Stock) – guitars, bass
- Allen B. Konstanz (Tobias Schönemann) – vocals, drums

=== Miscellaneous staff ===
- Martin Koller – production
