= Orange (Dark Suns album) =

Studio album by Dark Suns
- Released: 2 December 2011
- Recorded: 2010
- Genre: Progressive rock
- Length: 59:51
- Label: Prophecy Productions

Dark Suns chronology
Grave Human Genuine (2008)	Orange (2011)

Orange is the fourth studio album by German progressive metal band, Dark Suns. It was released on 2 December 2011. According to audience reviews, the album largely abandons the band's previous style to create a 1970s progressive rock vibe, similar to Opeth's Heritage, which was released the same year as Orange.

== Track listing ==
Orange
No.	Title	Length
1.	"Toy"	3:54
2.	"Eight Quiet Minutes"	3:54
3.	"Elephant"	4:56
4.	"Diamond"	3:14
5.	"Not Enough Fingers (instrumental)"	4:59
6.	"Ghost"	6:26
7.	"This Is Why They All Hate You in Hell"	4:31
8.	"Vespertine"	8:26
9.	"Scaleman"	5:21
10.	"Antipole"	14:13
Total length:		59:51

Re-Orange (acoustic EP included in the 2CD+DVD Digipak Edition)
No.	Title	Length
1.	"The Devil Fingers' Piece"	6:21
2.	"Megalomaniacs"	5:12
3.	"The Sad Song of the Elephant Man"	5:54
4.	"Four Quieter Minutes"	4:19
Total length:		21:41

== Personnel ==
- Niko Knappe – vocals, drums
- Maik Knappe – guitars
- Torsten Wenzel – guitars
- Jacob Muller – bass
- Ekkehard Meister – organ, piano, keyboards

Guests

- Evgeny Ring – alto sax
- Govinda Abbott – trumpet
