= The Water Sprite =

Debut album by the Empyrium reunion band Noekk

Studio album by Noekk
- Released: May 2005
- Genre: Progressive rock, doom metal
- Length: 46:20
- Label: Prophecy Productions

Noekk chronology
The Water Sprite (2005)	The Grimalkin (2006)

The Water Sprite is the debut album by the Empyrium reunion band Noekk. Along with a standard single-CD version, the album was also released in a digipak 2-CD version.

== Track listing ==
1. "The Watersprite" - 6:33
2. "T.B.'s Notion" - 5:05
3. "Strange Mountain" - 7:01
4. "How Fortunate the Man with None" - 7:51
5. "The Fiery Flower" - 5:01
6. "Moonface is Dead" - 4:28
7. "The Riddle Seeker" - 10:24
- "T.B.'s Notion" has lyrics by J.R.R. Tolkien.
- "How Fortunate the Man with None" is a cover of a song by Dead Can Dance.
