= Hexenwind =

Studio album by Dornenreich
- Released: November 18, 2005
- Recorded: at Studio E and Wallbach Studio
- Genre: Melodic black metal
- Length: 42:57
- Label: Prophecy Productions

Dornenreich chronology
Her von welken Nächten (2001)	Hexenwind (2005)	Durch Den Traum (2006)

Hexenwind is the fourth studio album by the Austrian black metal band Dornenreich. This album is available in a jewel case, and as a digipak with silver text on the cover. An additional hour of music was recorded during the sessions for this album. The music was added on their next album, Durch Den Traum.

== Track listing ==
1. "Von Der Quelle" – 2:11
2. "Der Hexe Flammend' Blick" – 11:38
3. "Der Hexe Nächtlich' Ritt" – 11:45
4. "Aus Längst Verhalltem Lied" – 4:10
5. "Zu Träumen Wecke Sich, Wer Kann" – 13:13

== Personnel ==
- Eviga: voices, guitars, tambourin
- Valnes: synths, vocals
- Michael Stein: session drums
