= Grimalkin (disambiguation) =

A grimalkin (or greymalkin) is an old or evil-looking female cat.

Grimalkin may also refer to:

- The Grimalkin, the 2006 album by Noekk
- SV Grimalkin, a yacht that competed but failed to finish in the 1979 Fastnet race
- Grimalkin, a witch assassin in the Spook's series by Joseph Delaney
- "Grimalkin", a poem by Thomas Lynch
- Grimalkin, the 1811 winner of the Doncaster Cup horse race
- Grimalkin, a comic strip by Louis Wain
- Grimalkin, a cat in the book "King of the Wind" by Marguerite Henry (1948)
- The Grimalkin is a malk in The Dresden Files; a species of feline fae allied with the Winter court, about the size of a bobcat, but stronger, faster and smarter than most humans.
- Grimalkin, a record label and nonprofit organization (and an official internship employer for students of VCUarts Kinetic Imaging department) based in Richmond, Virginia

Graymalkin may refer to:

- the familiar, presumably a cat, of one of the three witches in Shakespeare's Macbeth
- Graymalkin, a fictional character in the X-Men series of comics
- Graymalkin Industries, a front for X-Men activities in comics
- Graymalkin, a space station dismantled and used as material for the island of Providence in Marvel comics
- Graymalkin, a demonic cat in the 1957 British film Curse of the Demon
