= The Kindred of the Sunset =

EP by The Vision Bleak
- Released: 25 March 2016
- Genre: Gothic metal, doom metal
- Label: Prophecy Productions
- Producer: Martin Koller

The Vision Bleak chronology
Witching Hour (2013)	The Kindred of the Sunset (2016)	The Unknown (2016)

The Kindred of the Sunset is the fourth EP by German gothic metal band The Vision Bleak, released on 25 March 2016 through Prophecy Productions. It served as a teaser for the band's sixth studio album, The Unknown, which was released on 3 June 2016. The EP was announced on the band's official Facebook page on 21 February 2016, and four days later, on 25 February, the track listing was unveiled.

It contains four tracks; the first two were eventually featured on The Unknown, while the remaining two are EP-exclusive. A lyric video for the EP's eponymous track was uploaded to Prophecy's official YouTube channel on 24 March.

"The Sleeping Beauty" is a cover of the song by Swedish band Tiamat, originally present on their 1992 album Clouds.

== Track listing ==
All tracks are written by The Vision Bleak unless noted.

No.	Title	Length
1.	"The Kindred of the Sunset"	4:55
2.	"The Whine of the Cemetery Hound"	6:39
3.	"The Sleeping Beauty" (Tiamat cover)	4:13
4.	"Purification Afterglow" (instrumental)	2:36

== Personnel ==
=== The Vision Bleak ===
- Ulf Theodor Schwadorf (Markus Stock) – guitars, bass
- Allen B. Konstanz (Tobias Schönemann) – vocals, drums

=== Miscellaneous staff ===
- Martin Koller – production
- Łukasz Jaszak – cover art
