= Witchrot =

Canadian doom metal band

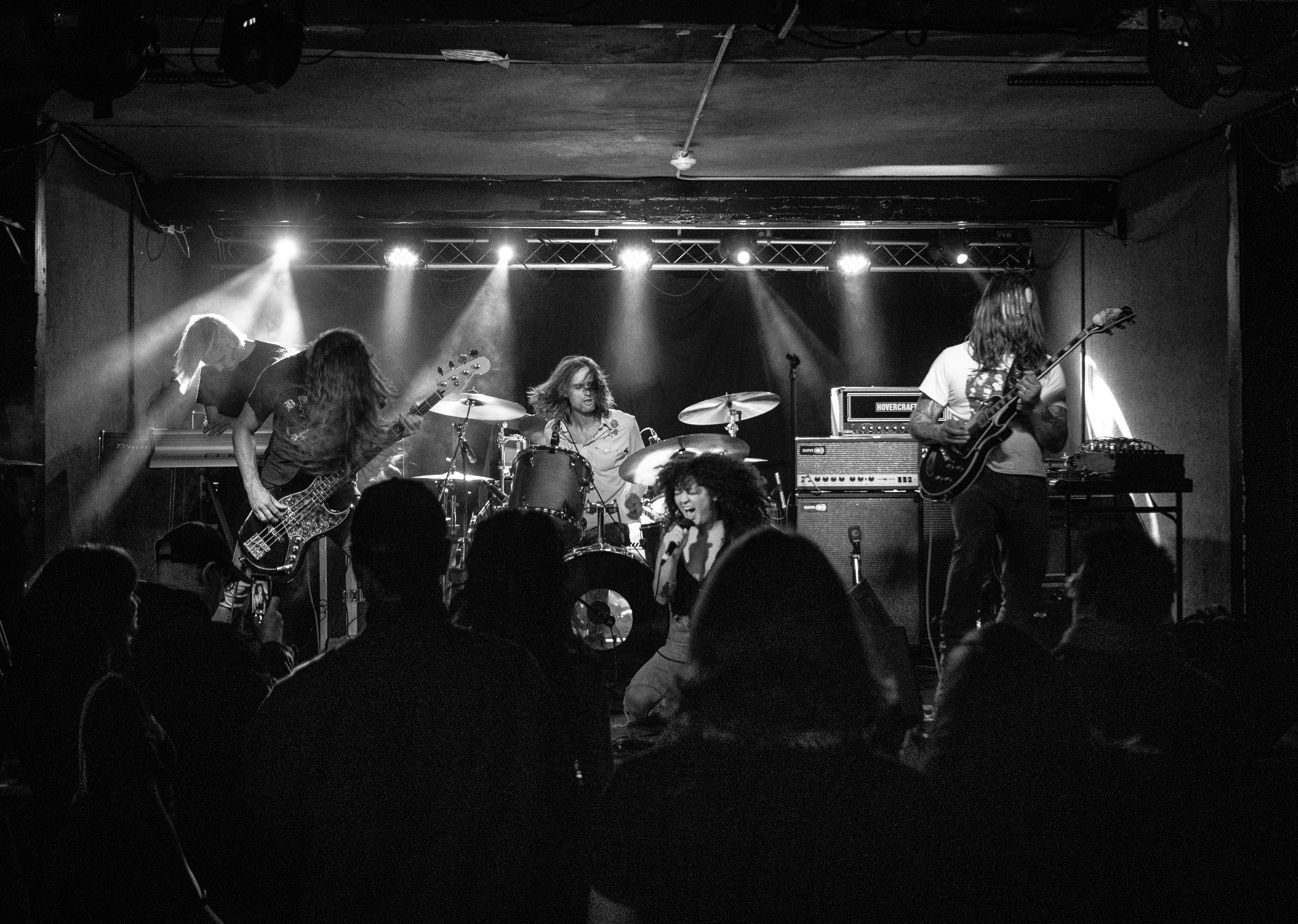
- Witchrot performing in April 2025 opening for REZN

Background information
- Origin: Toronto, Ontario, Canada
- Genre: Doom metal
- Years active: 2018–present
- Labels: Fuzzed and Buzzed Records; DHU Records; Majestic Mountain Records
- Members: Lea Alyssandra Reto; Peter Turik; Patrick Sherrard; Jon Ferreira; Myles Deck
- Past members: Simon Kou; Nick Kervin; Cam Alford

Witchrot is a Canadian doom metal band from Toronto, Ontario. The band consists of vocalist Lea Alyssandra Reto, guitarist Peter Turik, bassist Jon Ferreira, keyboardist Patrick Sherrard, and drummer Myles Deck.

The group gained international media attention in 2018 after a breakup announcement posted to Facebook went viral, attracting coverage from outlets including Vice, Kerrang!, and Sky News. Despite the announcement, the band continued performing and recording.

Witchrot released their debut studio album Hollow in 2021, followed by the album Soul Cellar in 2025.

== History ==
=== Viral breakup post and continuation (2018) ===
In late 2018, Witchrot drew widespread attention following viral coverage of a breakup announcement. The band later stated it would continue, clarifying that the drummer's reported death was not factual.

=== Hollow (2021) ===
Witchrot released its debut studio album, Hollow, in 2021.

=== Live in the Hammer (2022) ===
The band released the live album Live in the Hammer in 2022. According to the album notes, it was recorded on November 21, 2021 at Boxcar Sound in Hamilton, Ontario, and featured guest appearances by Daniel DeKay (Exciter) and Laura C. Bates (Völur).

=== Soul Cellar (2025) ===
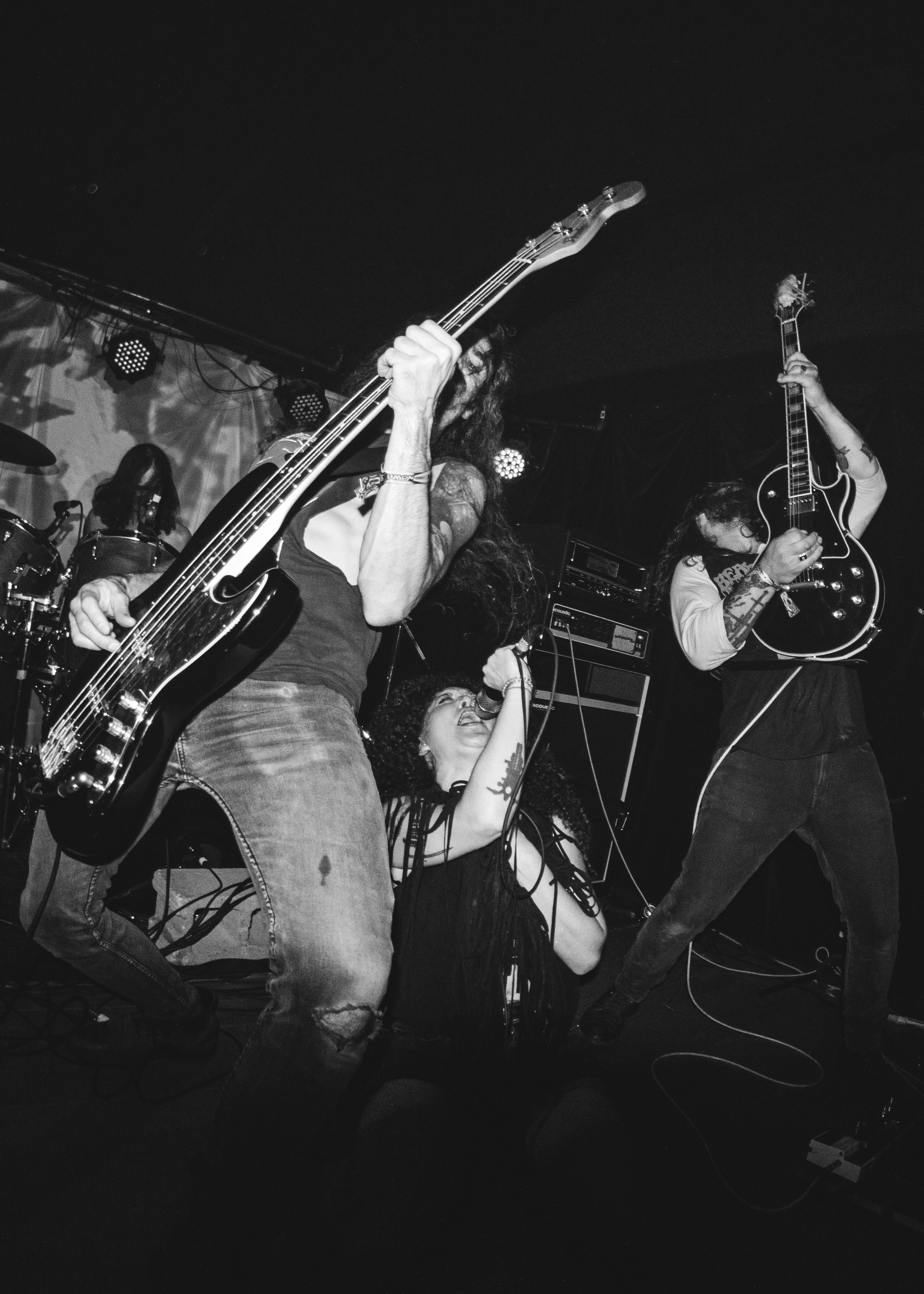
Witchrot performing at Project Nowhere Fest, 2025

Soul Cellar is the second studio album by Canadian doom metal band Witchrot, released on May 23, 2025, through Fuzzed and Buzzed Records in North America and Majestic Mountain Records in Europe. The album was recorded at Simcoe Mechanical by Nixon Boyd and at Palace Sound by Dylan Frankland, mixed by Frankland, and mastered by Tony Reed (Pentagram), at Heavy Head Recording Company. The artwork was created by ZZ Corpse.

The album consists of seven tracks: "Possession Deepens", "Tombstoned", "Throat Cutter", "Die Alone", "Green River", "Spineless", and the title track "Soul Cellar".

Two singles were released to promote the album, including "Possession Deepens" and "Throat Cutter", both of which premiered through online metal publications ahead of the album's release.

Following its release, Soul Cellar reached number six on the Doom Charts for May 2025.

In interviews promoting the album, members of the band stated that the material was written after a planned tour with The Obsessed was cancelled, which provided unexpected time to develop new songs.

The album marked a continued expansion of Witchrot's sound, incorporating psychedelic and ambient elements alongside their traditional doom metal foundation.

== Musical style ==
Witchrot has primarily been described as a doom metal band. Coverage has also characterized the band's sound as incorporating elements of sludge metal and psychedelic influences; Metal Hammer described Witchrot as a "psychedelic sludge" act, and referred to their style as "doom-meets-sludge-meets-gaze".

== Members ==
=== Current ===
- Lea Alyssandra Reto – vocals
- Peter Turik – guitar
- Jon Ferreira – bass
- Patrick Sherrard – keyboards
- Myles Deck – drums

=== Former ===
- Simon Kou – drums
- Nick Kervin – drums
- Cam Alford – bass
- Ky Ull – guitar

== Discography ==
=== Studio albums ===
- Hollow (2021)
- Soul Cellar (2025)

=== Live albums ===
- Live in the Hammer (2022)
