= Existence (Dark Suns album) =

Studio album by Dark Suns
- Released: February 21, 2005
- Recorded: 2004
- Genre: Progressive metal
- Length: 77:57
- Label: Prophecy Productions

Dark Suns chronology
Swanlike (2002)	Existence (2005)	Grave Human Genuine (2008)

Professional ratings
Review scores
Source	Rating
Metal Storm	(8.5/10)
Tartarean Desire	(8.0/10)

Existence is the second album by the German progressive metal band Dark Suns. It was released on 21 February 2005 through Prophecy records. For this release, the band dropped the harsh vocals that were used for the band's previous album Swanlike.

== Track listing ==
No.	Title	Length
1.	"Zero"	2:09
2.	"A Slumbering Portrait"	2:32
3.	"The Euphoric Sense"	5:54
4.	"Her and the Element"	6:39
5.	"Daydream"	4:40
6.	"Anemone"	6:27
7.	"You, a Phantom Still"	11:17
8.	"Gently Bleeding"	7:19
9.	"Abiding Space"	7:19
10.	"Patterns of Oblivion"	10:50
11.	"One Endless Childish Day"	12:59
Total length:		77:57

== Personnel ==
- Niko Knappe – vocals, drums
- Maik Knappe – Guitars
- Torsten Wenzel – Guitars
- Christoph Bormann – Bass
- Thomas Bremer – Keyboards
