= The Vision Bleak =

German gothic metal band

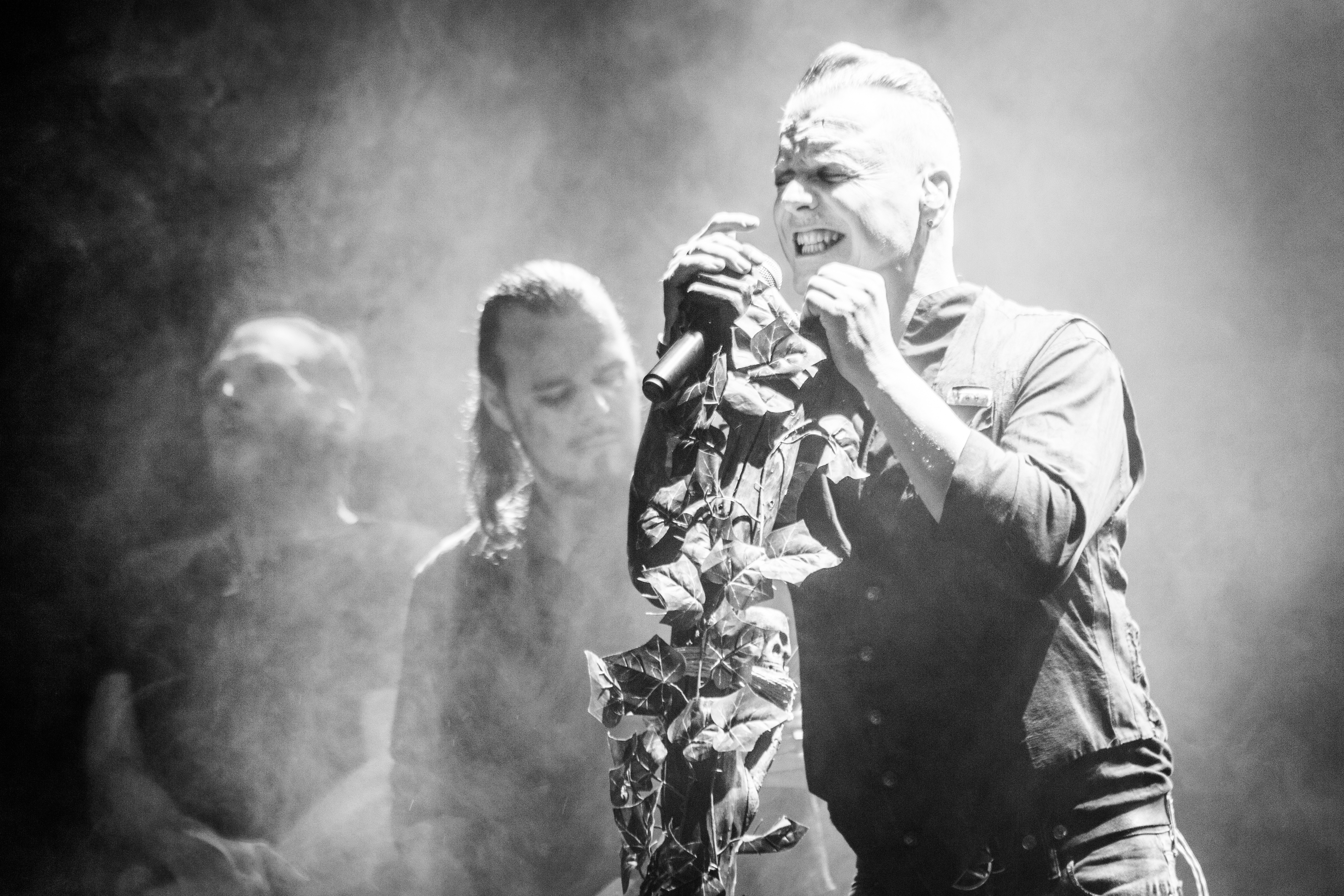
- The Vision Bleak performing at Prophecy Fest 2017

Background information
- Origin: Mellrichstadt, Bavaria, Germany
- Genres: Gothic metal
- Years active: 2000–present
- Label: Prophecy Productions
- Members: Ulf Theodor Schwadorf; Allen B. Konstanz
- Website: the-vision-bleak.de

The Vision Bleak is a German gothic metal band comprising Ulf Theodor Schwadorf (famous for his work with Empyrium and Noekk) and Allen B. Konstanz. The group's lyrics are noted for their horror themes and heavily allude to works of classic writers/filmmakers of the genre, such as H. P. Lovecraft, Edgar Allan Poe, George A. Romero and John Carpenter, among others. They self-describe their musical style, which mixes gothic metal, doom metal, symphonic metal and horror punk aesthetics, as "horror metal".

== History ==
The Vision Bleak was formed in 2000, in the Bavarian city of Mellrichstadt, by Markus Stock (a.k.a. Ulf Theodor Schwadorf) and Tobias Schönemann (a.k.a. Allen B. Konstanz). Their first release was the independent extended play Songs of Good Taste, which came out in 2001 and contained, among other tracks, a cover of The Moody Blues' "Nights in White Satin". The EP caught the attention of Prophecy Productions, who approached them to record their first full-length, The Deathship Has a New Captain, on 23 February 2004; counting with a guest appearance by Dark Sanctuary vocalist Dame Pandora, it would be their first of many releases under the Prophecy label. A teaser EP containing two tracks which would eventually appear on the album was released the year prior.

In 2005 the band released "Carpathia", a promotional single for their then-upcoming second full-length, Carpathia: A Dramatic Poem, which came out on 29 August 2005.

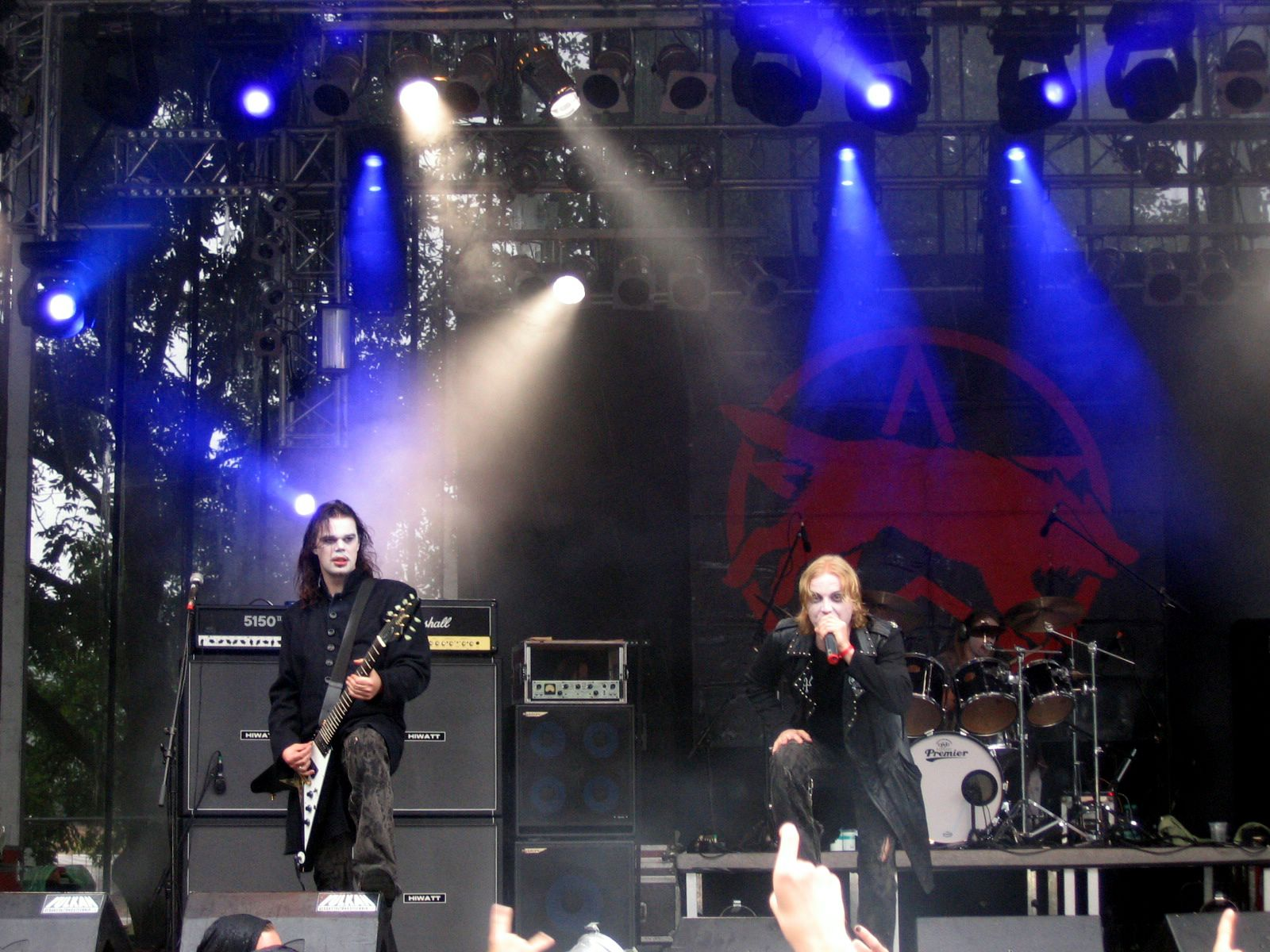
The Vision Bleak performing at Summer Breeze 2005

On 31 August 2007, the band released their third studio album, The Wolves Go Hunt Their Prey – it is a loose concept album whose first part is based on the story of the Indian feral girls Amala and Kamala, and its second part is mostly composed of the "Black Pharaoh Trilogy", a series of three songs based on H. P. Lovecraft's short story "The Haunter of the Dark". A promo EP which served as a teaser for the album, Club Single, was released the month prior.

The band's fourth album, Set Sail to Mystery, came out on 2 April 2010; it would be their first album (and so far only) to not feature a teaser released before it. It is a concept album loosely based on the writings of Romantic poets such as Edgar Allan Poe, Heinrich Heine and Lord Byron (its opening track, "A Curse of the Grandest Kind", takes its lyrics from an excerpt of Byron's 1817 dramatic poem Manfred, while "Descend into Maelstrom" references in its lyrics and title Poe's short story "A Descent into the Maelström"), and also of H. P. Lovecraft and Clark Ashton Smith. Niklas Kvarforth of Shining was a guest musician on the album.

The band's fifth album, Witching Hour, came out on 27 September 2013. A stop motion music video for the track "The Wood Hag", directed and animated by Fursy Teyssier, was uploaded on Prophecy's official YouTube channel as a teaser on 4 September.

On 31 October 2015, The Vision Bleak announced that they would begin a tour around Europe, accompanied by John Haughm of Agalloch and Danish death-doom band Saturnus, to promote their sixth album, The Unknown, which was released on 3 June 2016. The "Into the Unknown Tour" lasted from 25 March to 20 August 2016. A four-track EP that served as a teaser to The Unknown, entitled The Kindred of the Sunset, was announced on 21 February 2016 and eventually released on 25 March. As a means to celebrate their 16th anniversary, and to introduce newcomers to their music, the band also released a compilation album entitled Timeline: An Introduction to The Vision Bleak as a companion to The Unknown.

On 27 December 2015, the band stated that Fursy Teyssier officially joined them as bassist for future live performances. Teyssier stayed with the band until 2017.

The Vision Bleak's first studio album in eight years, Weird Tales, was released on April 12, 2024.

== Band members ==
=== Line-up ===
- Ulf Theodor Schwadorf (a.k.a. "Markus Stock") – vocals, electric guitars, electric bass guitar, electronic keyboards (2000–present)
- Allen B. Konstanz (a.k.a. "Tobias Schönemann") – vocals, drum kit, electronic keyboards (2000–present)

Band members live at Dark Troll festival 2025, Germany

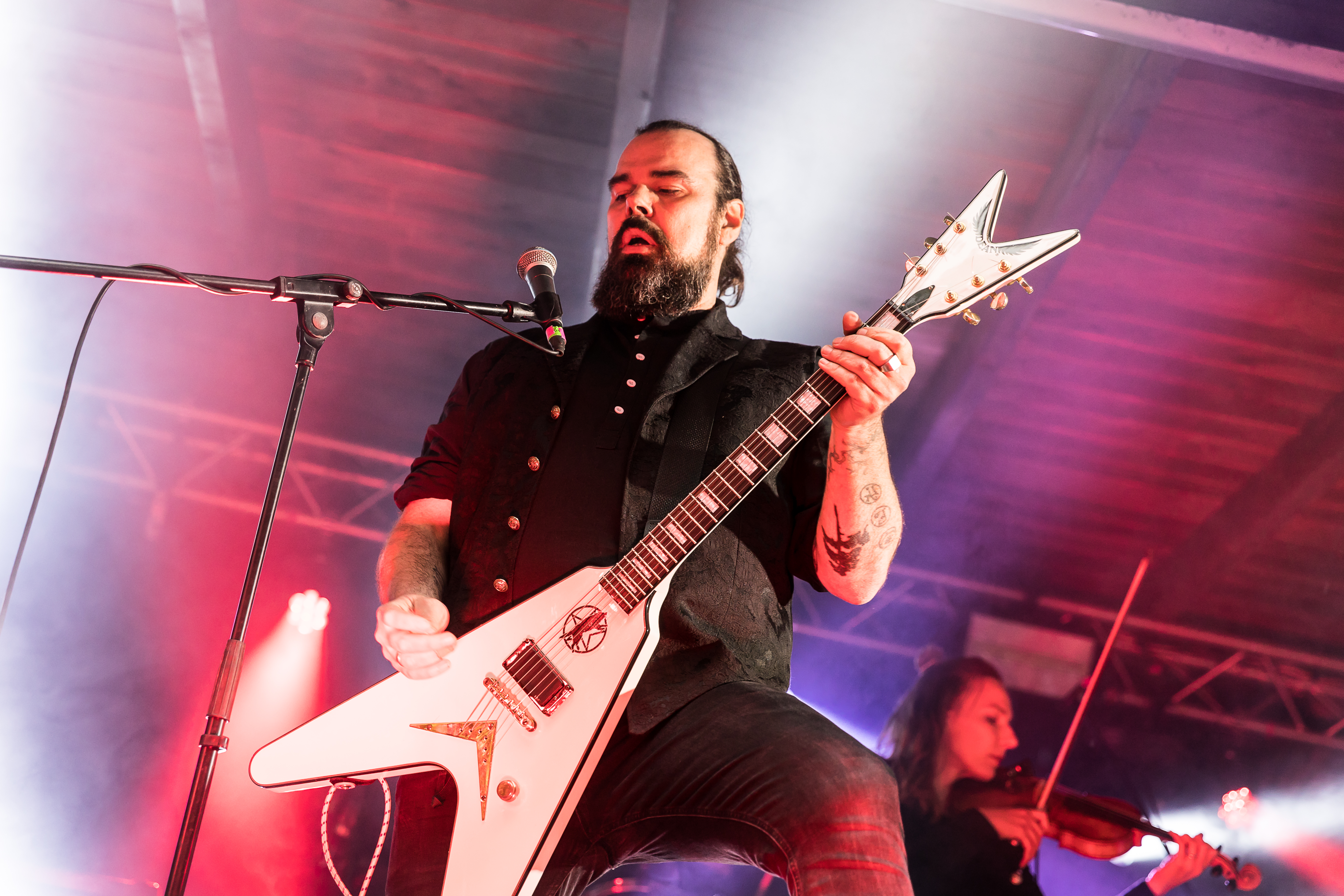
Ulf Theodor Schwadorf

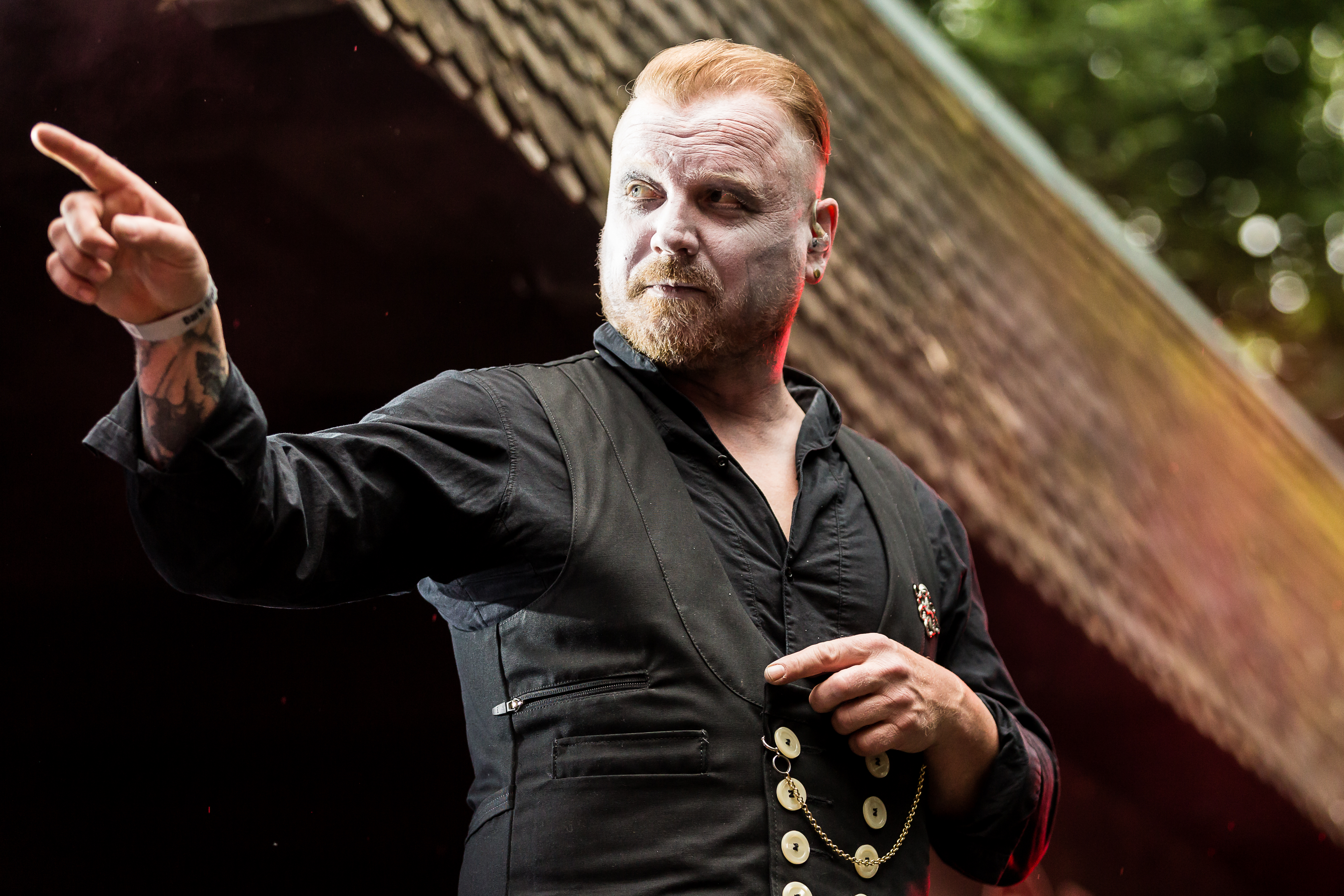
Allen B. Konstanz

=== Live musicians ===
- Fursy Teyssier – electric bass guitar (2015–2017)

== Discography ==
=== Studio albums ===
Year	Album
2004	The Deathship Has a New Captain: Label: Prophecy Productions; Format: CD, digital download
2005	Carpathia: A Dramatic Poem: Label: Prophecy Productions; Format: CD, digipak, digital download
2007	The Wolves Go Hunt Their Prey: Label: Prophecy Productions; Format: CD, digital download
2010	Set Sail to Mystery: Label: Prophecy Productions; Format: CD, digipak, digital download
2013	Witching Hour: Label: Prophecy Productions; Format: CD, digipak, digital download
2016	The Unknown: Label: Prophecy Productions; Format: CD, digital download
2024	Weird Tales: Label: Prophecy Productions; Format: CD, digital download

=== Extended plays ===
Year	Album
2001	Songs of Good Taste: Label: Self-released; Format: Cassette, CD, digital download
2003	The Vision Bleak EP: Label: Prophecy Productions; Format: CD, digital download
2007	Club Single EP: Label: Prophecy Productions; Format: CD
2016	The Kindred of the Sunset: Label: Prophecy Productions; Format: CD, digital download

=== Compilations ===
Year	Album
2016	Timeline: An Introduction to The Vision Bleak: Label: Prophecy Productions; Format: CD

=== Singles ===
Year	Single	Album
2005	"Carpathia"	Carpathia: A Dramatic Poem
2013	"The Wood Hag"	Witching Hour
