= The Minstrel's Curse =

Studio album by Noekk
- Released: February 22, 2008
- Recorded: during summer 2007 at Klangschmiede Studio E
- Genre: Progressive metal
- Length: 34:27
- Label: Prophecy Productions

Noekk chronology
The Grimalkin (2006)	The Minstrel's Curse (2008)

German progressive metal act Noekk released their third studio album, The Minstrel's Curse, on February 22, 2008. It was recorded and mixed during summer 2007 by Markus Stock and produced by MK for Prophecy Productions. The songs were composed and performed by Noekk and special guest Allen B. Konstanz.

== Track listing ==
No.	Title	Length
1.	"The Minstrel's Curse"	07:53
2.	"Song of Durin"	06:37
3.	"How Long Is Ever"	05:28
4.	"The Rumour and the Giantess"	14:27

== Credits ==
- F. Baldachini
- F.F. Yuggoth
- Guest appearance by Allen B. Konstanz
