= Dornenreich =

Austrian melodic black metal band

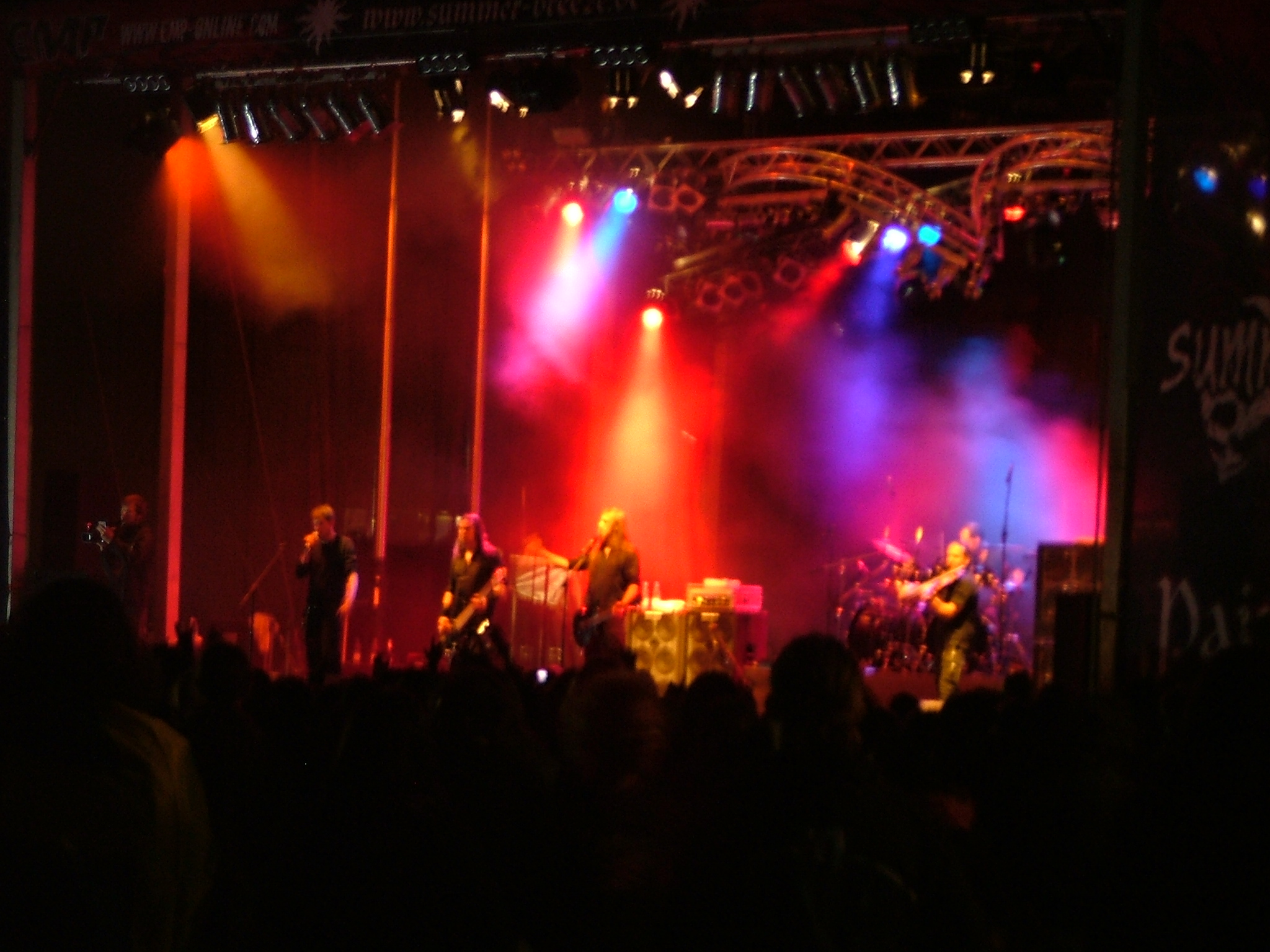
- Austrian metal band Dornenreich at the Summer Breeze in Dinkelsbühl

Background information
- Also known as: DornenReich (1995–1999)
- Origin: Tyrol, Austria
- Genres: Melodic black metal, avant-garde metal, neofolk (recent)
- Years active: 1995–present
- Label: Prophecy Productions
- Members: Jochen "Evíga" Stock; Moritz "Gilván" Neuner; Thomas "Ínve" Riesner
- Past members: Thomas "Valñes" Stock; Surtur
- Website: dornenreich.com

Dornenreich (up to Bitter ist's dem Tod zu dienen known as DornenReich) is an Austrian melodic black metal band, founded in 1995. Alongside their metal sound, Dornenreich regard their music as neofolk-influenced. They have released eight albums on Prophecy Productions.

== History ==
Thomas "Valñes" Stock founded the band in December 1995, and named it "Dornenreich" as due to various possible interpretations ("Realm of thorns" or "Full of thorns"). Jochen "Evíga" Stock joined the band in July 1996. In April 1997, Moritz "Gilvan" Neuner completed the line-up, but left after the release of Her von welken Nächten. Four years later, Hexenwind was released. It was planned as a double album with the later released Durch den Traum. Thomas Stock quit the band in April 2006 to concentrate on his musical project, "Eyas". Jochen Stock confirmed that Thomas "Inve" Riesner was the new band member. Riesner played violin on Her von welken Nächten. In 2007, Dornenreich played at Summer Breeze and documented this concert with ten cameras for the DVD Nachtreisen. After the album In Luft geritzt's release in 2008, Flammentriebe tied in with Her von welken Nächten.

== Members ==
=== Current members ===
- Jochen Stock (a.k.a. Evíga) – vocals, electric guitar, acoustic guitar (1996–present), bass (1996–2001, 2013–2014), keyboards (1997–1998), tambourine (2005), psaltery (2006), percussion (2020–2021)
- Moritz Neuner (a.k.a. Gilván or Dragomir) – drums, percussion (1997–2002, 2007–present), flute (1997–1998)
- Thomas Riesner (a.k.a. Ínve) – violin (2006–present, guest in 2000–2001), keyboards (2020–2021)

=== Former members ===
- Thomas Stock (a.k.a. Valñes or Dunkelkind) – keyboards (1995–2006), electric guitar (1995–1997), clean vocals (1997–2006), cello (1998–1999)
- Philipp (a.k.a. Surtur) – bass (1996)

=== Current live members ===
- David Conrad (a.k.a. Eklatanz) – bass, vocals (2018–present)

=== Former live members ===
- Ulf Theodor Schwadorf – bass (2007)
- Thomas Helm – vocals (2007)

=== Guest members ===
- Stefan Niederwieser – cello (1998–1999)
- Bianca Riesner – cello (2000–2001)
- Thomas Riesner (a.k.a. Ínve) – violin (2000–2001)
- Michael Stein – drums, percussion (2005–2006)

== Discography ==
Studio albums

- Nicht um zu sterben (1998)
- Bitter ist's dem Tod zu dienen (1999)
- Her von welken Nächten (2001)
- Hexenwind (2005)
- Durch den Traum (2006)
- In Luft geritzt (2008)
- Flammentriebe (2011)
- Freiheit (2014)
- Du wilde Liebe sei (2021)

Other releases

- Mein Flügelschlag (1997, demo)
- Whom the Moon a Nightsong Sings (2010, compilation, various artists)
- Schwellenklänge (2018, box set compilation)
