= Her von welken Nächten =

Studio album by Dornenreich
- Released: February 2001
- Genres: Avant-garde metal, black metal, ambient
- Length: 58:53
- Label: Prophecy Productions

Dornenreich chronology
Bitter Ist's Dem Tod Zu Dienen (1999)	Her von welken Nächten (2001)	Hexenwind (2005)

Her von welken Nächten is the third studio album by the Austrian band Dornenreich.

== Track listing ==
1. "Eigenwach" – 6:44
2. "Ich Bin Aus Mir" – 6:13
3. "Wer Hat Angst Vor Einsamkeit?" – 6:19
4. "Grell Und Dunkel Strömt Das Leben" – 5:00
5. "Innerwille Ist Mein Docht" – 5:51
6. "Hier Weht Ein Moment" – 6:30
7. "Schwarz Schaut Tiefsten Lichterglanz" – 7:29
8. "Trauerbrandung" – 6:17
9. "Mein Publikum - Der Augenblick" – 8:30
