= Gloria (Disillusion album) =

Studio album by Disillusion
- Released: October 20, 2006
- Recorded: 2005–2006
- Genre: Progressive metal Industrial metal
- Length: 51:10
- Label: Metal Blade Records
- Producer: Vurtox

Disillusion chronology
Back to Times of Splendor (2004)	Gloria (2006)	The Liberation (2019)

Professional ratings
Review scores
Source	Rating
Allmusic	link
Obnoxious Listeners	link

Gloria is the second full-length album by the German metal band Disillusion. It was released on October 20, 2006, via Metal Blade Records.

== Track listing ==
No.	Title	Length
1.	"The Black Sea"	5:16
2.	"Dread It"	4:24
3.	"Don't Go Any Further"	3:51
4.	"Avalanche"	5:08
5.	"Gloria"	6:11
6.	"Aerophobic"	3:21
7.	"The Hole We Are In"	5:35
8.	"Save the Past"	3:44
9.	"Lava"	4:05
10.	"Too Many Broken Cease Fires"	5:34
11.	"Untiefen"	4:01

== Credits ==
- Vurtox (Andy Schmidt) − vocals, guitars, bass, keyboards
- Rajk Barthel − guitars
- Jens Maluschka − drums
