= Back to Times of Splendor =

Studio album by Disillusion
- Released: April 6, 2004
- Recorded: May–November, 2003 - Salvation Recording, Leipzig
- Genres: Progressive metal Melodic death metal
- Length: 56:47
- Label: Metal Blade Records
- Producer: Vurtox

Disillusion chronology
The Porter (2002)	Back to Times of Splendor (2004)	Gloria (2006)

Professional ratings
Review scores
Source	Rating
Allmusic	4/5 stars
Obnoxious Listeners	5/5 stars
Deliligin Daglari	5/5 stars

Back to Times of Splendor is the debut studio album by German progressive metal band Disillusion. It contains a concept-based story, written by Vurtox (Andy Schmidt); with each song dividing the story into separate conjoined sections (or chapters). The album received critical acclaim upon release and is considered by many to be a modern metal classic.

== Track listing ==
- All Songs Written By Disillusion.

No.	Title	Length
1.	"...And the Mirror Cracked"	8:27
2.	"Fall"	4:53
3.	"Alone I Stand in Fires"	6:53
4.	"Back to Times of Splendor"	14:39
5.	"A Day by the Lake"	4:53
6.	"The Sleep of Restless Hours"	17:02
Total length:		56:47

== Personnel ==
=== Disillusion ===
- Vurtox (Andy Schmidt) − vocals, guitar, acoustic guitar, bass guitar, keyboards, orchestral arrangements
- Rajk Barthel − guitar
- Jens Maluschka − drums

=== Additional musicians ===
- Thomas Bremer − piano on "... And the Mirror Cracked"
- Matthias Schifter − fretless bass on "And the Mirror Cracked" and "A Day by the Lake"
- Denise Schneider − female voice on "Fall" and "The Sleep of Restless Hours"
- Stefan Launicke − piano intro on "Back to Times of Splendor" strings on "The Sleep of Restless Hours"
- Alex Tscholakov − drum loops and percussion on "Alone I Stand in Fires"

== Production ==
- Recorded May through Nov. 2003 by Vurtox and Jan Stצlzel at Salvation Recording, Leipzig
- Vocals and acoustic guitars recorded by Alexander Tscholakov
- Mixed by Alexander Tscholakov, Vurtox and Disillusion during December to January 2003 at TAM Recordings
- Mastered at Mastersound Studio (Fellbach) January 2004 by Alexander Krull and Disillusion
