= Disillusion (band) =

German progressive metal band

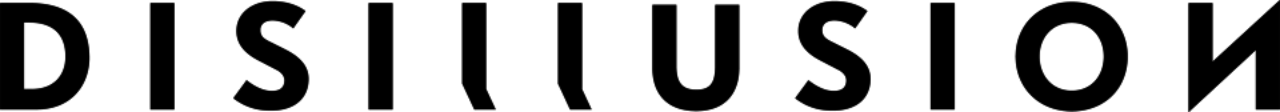

Background information
- Origin: Leipzig, Germany
- Genres: Progressive metal; melodic death metal
- Years active: 1994–present
- Labels: Metal Blade, Prophecy Productions
- Members: Andy Schmidt; Ben Haugg; Robby Kranz; Martin Schulz
- Past members: (See: Past members for list)
- Website: www.disillusion.de

Disillusion is a German progressive metal band from Leipzig.

== History ==
=== Beginnings without record deal ===
Andy Schmidt, Tobias Spier, Alex Motz, Markus Espenhain and Jan Stölzel founded Disillusion in 1994. The band played thrash metal. Despite the departure of bassist Markus Espenhain in early 1996, they recorded the demo Subspace Insanity in March the same year.

Red followed in 1997 as the band developed their style. Andy Schmidt and Alex Tscholakov mixed and mastered the second demo at TAM Recording in Zwickau. Despite growing local success and the prospect of becoming more serious, Disillusion was put on hold because of lack of time of some band members.

Disillusion started again with the recruitment of guitarist Rajk Barthel and drummer Jens Maluschka in 1999 and 2000. They played some concerts and recorded their third demo, Three Neuron Kings, in summer 2001 with Alex Tscholakov at TAM Recording. The record received positive reviews by the music press. In spring of 2002, Disillusion went on tour and won an EP production at the Legacy Band Contest. The record was recorded at TAM Recording in 2002 and called The Porter. It also reached international reputation in the music press and attracted the attention of larger labels.

=== Back To Times of Splendor ===
Disillusion signed a contract with Metal Blade Records and released the first album Back to Times of Splendor in 2004. Stylistically, the music is mostly progressive death metal. Back to Times of Splendor was very well received by the critics. The magazine Rock Hard even spoke of a hot contender for the title "Debut of the Year."

After the release Disillusion performed at several festivals (including Summer Breeze Open Air) and a European tour as support for Amon Amarth and Impious. During this time, the album was presented in special shows together with Leipzig musicians from Dark Suns and Unloved.

=== Gloria ===
The successor named Gloria was released on October 20, 2006. With the album, Disillusion entered new musical territory and relied heavily on distorted vocals as well as more electronic sounding elements. The latter was developed mainly by the production duo Philipp Hirsch and Heiko Tippelt of film-m. The new album showed a clear change of style compared to the predecessor. Disillusion did not want stylistically a successor to Back To Times of Splendor, because from the perspective of the band in the album everything was said. This is evident in the Gloria song "Save the Past". Fans and reviewers took Gloria very controversially. After the release Disillusion played European-wide concerts, although this time the band did not play a cohesive tour but played several individual shows as headliners.

=== Post Gloria and hiatus ===
On December 8, 2009, Andy Schmidt announced that the band had been separated from guitarist Rajk Barthel. At the end of 2010, Sebastian Hupfer joined the band as the new guitar player. In 2011 some shows were played. This was followed by a hiatus, which Andy Schmidt explained with private challenges of the individual band members.

=== Alea: Comeback ===
In 2015 a fan asked the band to play an exclusive concert in Vienna. After Matthias Becker was no longer available because of his band SAFI, the French bassist Djon joined the band. Until then he played in a local project called echo.mensch together with Sebastian Hupfer. On May 29, 2015, Disillusion played Back to Times of Splendor for the first time in its entirety in Vienna. There were further shows in Germany and a final comeback concert in the sold-out Werk 2 in Leipzig on December 4, 2015. The new ten minute single Alea was presented live for the first time. In April 2016, Ben Haugg was officially introduced as a new bass player, as Djon had to return to France due to private obligations. On October 7, 2016 Alea was released digitally and as a CD via Kick the Flame Publishing (the publisher of the former guitarist Rajk Bartel). There followed a mini-tour at the end of the year through Germany and Austria.

=== Third album - The Liberation ===
In March 2017 Disillusion announced that they would begin writing a third album. To aide with the writing process, Andy Schmidt isolated himself to a small cabin in the woods somewhere in the Czech Republic for 3 weeks to work undisturbed on new songs. Simultaneously the band asked for fan support via Patreon to finance the production. The first goal - support for Andy - was reached within two days. The band then announced to complete the third album within 12 months, but later extended that deadline to another year as the band did not want to feel rushed to provide their fans with an inadequate and incomplete experience. During this time, the band announced another line-up change. This time, bass player, Ben Haugg, would be moving on to third guitar and the band announced two new members. Josh Saldanha, a drummer from Dubai and Felix Tilemann who would be replacing Ben on the Bass. The album, The Liberation was eventually released in 2019 and entered the German Top100 Album Charts at 45. Following the release of the album, Saldanha was replaced by Martin Schulz on drums. After Tilemann had to leave the band for personal reasons, Frank Schumacher took over the bass for live shows in 2019, until Robby Kranz took over bass and additional backing vocal duties as a full member at the beginning of 2020. Following the cancelation of further shows due to the Covid-19 pandemic, Disillusion did a livestream event in April 2020. Following this, the band started with the songwriting process for the next album.

=== AYAM ===
After performances in the summer of 2022 at festivals such as Graspop Metal Meeting and Dong Open Air, the band announced in early August that the fourth album will be called AYAM and will be released worldwide on November 4 of the same year. At the same time they released Am Abgrund, the album's opener, as the first single. This was followed by a joint European tour in September with Obscura (band) and Persefone, which brought Disillusion to countries such as Italy and the UK for the first time. After the release of the second single Tormento, the band released the album AYAM at the beginning of November, which was highly praised by fans and the press alike and reached number 35 in the German album charts, marking the highest chart entry in the band's history.

== Band members ==
=== Current ===
- Andy Schmidt – vocals, guitar (1994–present)
- Ben Haugg – guitar (2016–present)
- Martin Schulz – drums (2019–present)
- Robby Kranz – bass, vocals (2020–present)
- Frederic Ruckert – keyboards (2023–present; session and live 2019–2023)

=== Past ===
- Tobias Spier – vocals, guitar (1994–1997)
- Alex Motz – drums (1994–1997)
- Clemens Frank – drums (2007; live only)
- Markus Espenhain – bass guitar (1994–1996)
- Shya Hely – backing vocals (2005; live only)
- Alex Tscholakov – drums (2007–2008)
- Alla Fedynitch – bass (2007–2008; live only)
- Rajk Barthel – guitar (1999–2009)
- Matthias Becker – bass (2008–2015)
- Djon – bass (2015)
- Jens Maluschka – drums (2000–2007, 2008−2018)
- Felix Tilemann – bass (2018–2019)
- Josh Saldanha – drums (2018–2019)
- Frank Schumacher – bass (2019; live only)
- Sebastian Hupfer – guitar (2010–2022)

== Discography ==
=== Studio albums ===
- Back to Times of Splendor (2004)
- Gloria (2006)
- The Liberation (2019)
- Ayam (2022)

=== Demos and EPs ===
- Rehearsal (1995) (demo)
- Subspace Insanity (1996) (demo)
- Red (1997) (demo)
- Three Neuron Kings (2001) (EP)
- Alea (2016) (EP)

=== Singles ===
- The Porter (2002) (single)
- Between (2020) (single)
- Am Abgrund (2022)

=== Other ===
- Fate of Norns Release Shows (2004) (split album including; Amon Amarth, Fragments of Unbecoming and Impious)
