= Laster (band) =

Dutch metal band

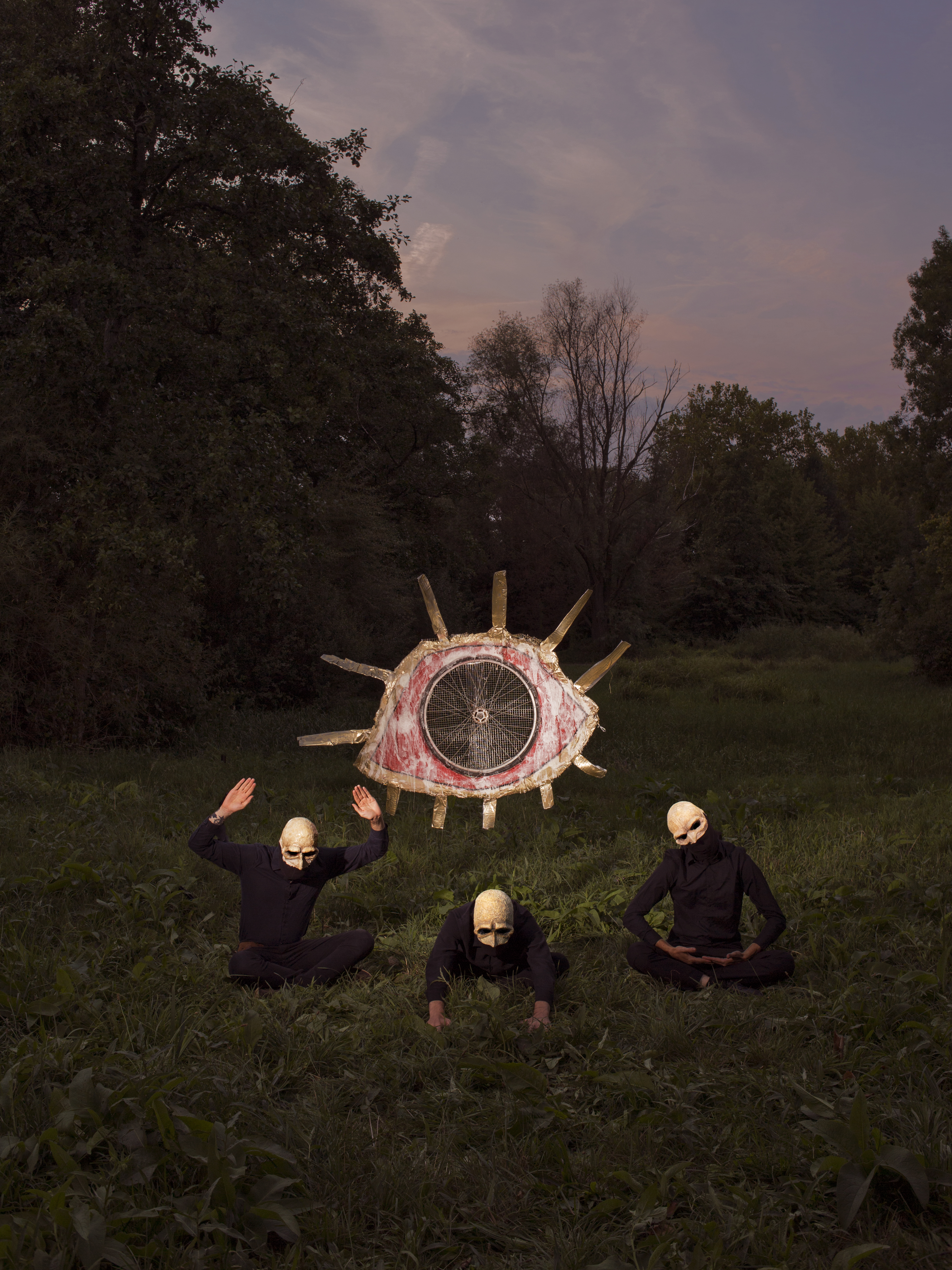
- Laster, 2019

Background information
- Origin: Utrecht, the Netherlands
- Genres: Avant-garde metal, Art rock, Atmospheric black metal, New wave, Shoegaze
- Years active: 2012–present
- Labels: Prophecy Productions, Dunkelheit Produktionen, Broken Limbs Recordings, Ván Records
- Members: Nicky; Sylwin; Wessel
- Website: lasterspraak.nl

Laster is an avant-garde, atmospheric black metal band hailing from Utrecht, The Netherlands. However, the band describes their music as obscure dance music.

== History ==
=== Formation and early years (2012-2016) ===
Formed in 2012 by N. and W., to escape the musical boundaries they had drawn in their former bands Northward and White Oak, Laster immediately drew attention by writing and recording their first demo, Wijsgeer & Narreman, within one day. The demo was released through the German metal label Dunkelheit Produktionen, and shortly after its release S. (a former member of Northward) joined the band. As a three-piece, Laster started playing shows throughout the northwest of Europe whilst writing and recording De verste verte is hier, their first full-length album. The album was released through Dunkelheit Produktionen on vinyl and CD, and on cassette through New York-based Broken Limbs Recordings. In 2016, De verste verte is hier was followed up by a 12" split-release with Wederganger, released by Ván Records.

=== Experimental era (2016-present) ===
Ons vrije fatum, Laster's second album, was released in January 2017. The British Terrorizer acclaimed it album of the month due to a "surpassing [of] all expectations and growing into a magnificent, untameable beast." In the same year, Laster played Roadburn Festival and signed with Prophecy Productions for the release of their third full-length album.

Laster's third full-length album entitled Het wassen oog saw the light on April 5, 2019, through Prophecy Productions. The 36-page art-book version of this release also contains their previously unreleased Stadsluik EP, extended artworks, and an experimental short story named An introspection.

Having made their name as an original and genre-bending band, N. S. and W. were asked among others from the new wave of Dutch experimental black metal acts to partake in the Maalstroom collaboration for the 2019 edition of Roadburn Festival. Subsequently, Zuriaake invited Laster to perform at China's first black metal festival, Sirius Fest, followed by a two-week tour through mainland China.

Laster's fourth full-length Andermans mijne was released on October 13, 2023. Following its release, Laster toured Europe with Japanese avant-garde metallers Sigh, and played the album in full on Roadburn 2024.

== Lyrical style ==
Laster's lyrics are described as an attempt to re-enchant daily life and all its complexities. Themes like love, distress, confusion, sexuality, and identity are often centralised, questioned, and re-imagined. So far, all lyrics have been written in the Dutch language.

== Kunstlicht ==
Next to their musical endeavours, Laster runs Kunstlicht, a record label "aiming to bring together the divergent and eclectic." So far, Kunstlicht has released material by affiliated acts like Silver Knife, Grey Aura, and Wolves in the Condo.

== Discography ==
Albums

- De verste verte is hier (2014)
- Ons vrije fatum (2017)
- Het wassen oog (2019)
- Andermans mijne (2023)

EPs

- Stadsluik (2019)

Demos

- Wijsgeer & Narreman (2012)

Splits

- Vederlicht verraad (2016, with Wederganger)

Videos

- Schone schijn (2019)
- Kunstlicht (2023)
- Andermans mijne (2023)
