= Finnr's Cane =

Canadian atmospheric black metal band

- Finnr's Cane in Sudbury, in 2014. From left to right: The Bard, The Slave, and The Peasant.

Background information
- Origin: Sudbury, Ontario, Canada
- Genres: Black metal,doom metal, atmospheric black metal
- Years active: 2008–present
- Labels: Nordvis Produktion, Prophecy Productions, Frostscald Records
- Members: The Peasant; The Bard
- Past members: The Slave
- Website: finnrs-cane.bandcamp.com

Finnr's Cane is an atmospheric black metal band from Sudbury, Ontario, Canada, founded in 2008.

The band consists of The Peasant and The Bard, with each self-assigned pseudonym chosen to afford anonymity for the members.

Finnr's Cane's debut album, Wanderlust, was originally released in 2010 through Frostscald Records and later re-released by Prophecy Productions in 2011. Their second album, A Portrait Painted by the Sun, was released in 2013 by Prophecy Productions, followed by Elegy in 2018, and a self-titled release in 2025 through Nordvis Produktion.

A unique feature of the music of Finnr's Cane is the minimal use of bass guitar, while including cello and flute arrangements.

According to the band members, much of the music of Finnr's Cane is initially created by means of improvisation.

While Finnr's Cane have existed solely as a studio project since their inception, The Bard has described a willingness to play live if the right opportunity presented itself.

== Band members ==
- The Peasant
- The Bard

== Past members ==
- The Slave

== Discography ==
- Wanderlust (2010)
- A Portrait Painted by the Sun (2013)
- Elegy (2018)
- Finnr's Cane (2025)
