= Set Sail to Mystery =

2010 studio album by the Vision Bleak

Studio album by The Vision Bleak
- Released: 2 April 2010
- Genre: Gothic metal
- Length: 44:46
- Label: Prophecy Productions
- Producer: Martin Koller

The Vision Bleak chronology
The Wolves Go Hunt Their Prey (2007)	Set Sail to Mystery (2010)	Witching Hour (2013)

Set Sail to Mystery is the fourth studio album by German gothic metal band The Vision Bleak, released on 2 April 2010 through Prophecy Productions. A digipak edition containing seven bonus tracks was also released. It counted with a guest appearance by Niklas Kvarforth of Shining fame.

== Track listing ==
All tracks are written by The Vision Bleak unless noted.

No.	Title	Length
1.	"A Curse of the Grandest Kind" (lyrics by Lord Byron)	3:55
2.	"Descend into Maelstrom"	5:26
3.	"I Dined with the Swans"	4:19
4.	"A Romance with the Grave" (lyrics by Heinrich Heine)	5:50
5.	"The Outsider"	5:11
6.	"Mother Nothingness (The Triumph of Ubbo-Sathla)"	8:11
7.	"The Foul Within"	5:59
8.	"He Who Paints the Black of Night"	5:54

Digipak release bonus tracks
No.	Title	Length
9.	"I Dined with the Swans (Alternate Version)" (feat. Niklas Kvarforth)	4:20
10.	"By the Misery of Fate He Was Haunted" (Master's Hammer cover)	5:06
11.	"Descend into Maelstrom (Classic Version in Monochrome)" (instrumental)	2:47
12.	"Mother Nothingness (Classic Version in Monochrome)" (instrumental)	2:57
13.	"The Foul Within (Classical Version in Monochrome)" (instrumental)	2:33
14.	"I Dined with the Swans (Piano Version in Monochrome)" (instrumental)	3:06
15.	"A Farewell at Sea (Classical Version in Monochrome)" (instrumental)	2:14

=== Trivia ===
- "A Curse of the Grandest Kind" takes its lyrics from an excerpt of Lord Byron's 1817 dramatic poem Manfred.
- "Descend into Maelstrom" references both in its title and lyrics Edgar Allan Poe's short story "A Descent into the Maelström".
- "I Dined with the Swans" was inspired by the life of German serial killer Peter Kürten.
- "A Romance with the Grave" was based upon a poem by Heinrich Heine.
- "Mother Nothingness (The Triumph of Ubbo-Sathla)" references the eponymous deity created by Clark Ashton Smith as a part of the Cthulhu Mythos.
- "The Foul Within" is based upon the 1973 film The Exorcist.
- "He Who Paints the Black of Night" was inspired by Oscar Wilde's novel The Picture of Dorian Gray.
- "By the Misery of Fate He Was Haunted" is an English-language adaptation of Czech black metal band Master's Hammer's song "Já mizérií osudu jsem pronásledován...", originally present on their 1992 album Jilemnický okultista.

== Critical reception ==
Sonic Seducer lauded the album's mix of hardness and atmosphere, and noted the theatrical style that is typical of The Vision Bleak.

== Personnel ==
=== The Vision Bleak ===
- Ulf Theodor Schwadorf (Markus Stock) – vocals, guitars, bass, keyboards
- Allen B. Konstanz (Tobias Schönemann) – vocals, drums, keyboards

=== Guest musicians ===
- Niklas Kvarforth – vocals (on track 9)
- Thomas Helm – additional tenor vocals
- Sophia Brommer – additional vocals (track 5)

=== Miscellaneous staff ===
- Martin Koller – production
