= The Grimalkin =

Studio album by Noekk
- Released: May 19, 2006
- Recorded: Sept–Oct 2005 at Studio E
- Genre: Progressive metal
- Length: 41:32
- Label: Prophecy Productions

Noekk chronology
The Water Sprite (2005)	The Grimalkin (2006)	The Minstrel's Curse (2008)

The Grimalkin is the second studio album by German progressive metal band Noekk, released on May 19, 2006. It was recorded and mixed at Studio E in September and October 2005 by Markus Stock. All the songs and lyrics are by Noekk.

== Track listing ==
1. The Albatross - 11:00
2. The Grimalkin - 10:09
3. Codex Deserta - 20:23

== Credits ==
- F. Baldachini: voice, keys, guitar
- F.F. Yuggoth: drums, bass, guitar
