= The Wolves Go Hunt Their Prey =

Studio album by The Vision Bleak
- Released: 31 August 2007
- Genre: Gothic metal
- Length: 43:19
- Label: Prophecy Productions
- Producer: Martin Koller

The Vision Bleak chronology
Club Single EP (2007)	The Wolves Go Hunt Their Prey (2007)	Set Sail to Mystery (2010)

The Wolves Go Hunt Their Prey is the third studio album by German gothic metal band The Vision Bleak, released on 31 August 2007 through Prophecy Productions.

== Track listing ==
All tracks are written by The Vision Bleak.

No.	Title	Length
1.	"Amala and Kamala" (instrumental)	1:56
2.	"She-Wolf"	5:13
3.	"The Demon of the Mire"	6:42
4.	"The Black Pharaoh (Part I: Introduction)"	3:21
5.	"The Black Pharaoh (Part II: The Shining Trapezohedron)"	5:10
6.	"The Black Pharaoh (Part III: The Vault of Nephren-Ka)"	6:02
7.	"The Eldrich Beguilement"	4:57
8.	"Evil Is of Old Date"	4:51
9.	"By Our Brotherhood with Seth"	5:08

=== Trivia ===
- Tracks 1 to 2 reference the famous case of the Indian feral girls Amala and Kamala.
- Tracks 4 to 6 form the "Black Pharaoh Trilogy", loosely based on H. P. Lovecraft's short story "The Haunter of the Dark".

== Personnel ==
=== The Vision Bleak ===
- Ulf Theodor Schwadorf (Markus Stock) – vocals, guitars, bass, keyboards, sitar
- Allen B. Konstanz (Tobias Schönemann) – vocals, drums, keyboards

=== Miscellaneous staff ===
- Martin Koller – production
