= Carpathia: A Dramatic Poem =

Studio album by The Vision Bleak
- Released: 29 August 2005
- Genre: Gothic metal
- Length: 41:57
- Label: Prophecy Productions
- Producer: Martin Koller

The Vision Bleak chronology
The Deathship Has a New Captain (2004)	Carpathia: A Dramatic Poem (2005)	Club Single EP (2007)

Carpathia: A Dramatic Poem is the second studio album by German gothic metal band The Vision Bleak, released on 29 August 2005 through Prophecy Productions. A digipak edition containing four additional live bonus tracks was also released.

== Track listing ==
All tracks are written by The Vision Bleak.

No.	Title	Length
1.	"The Drama of the Wicked" (instrumental)	2:11
2.	"Secrecies in Darkness"	4:25
3.	"Carpathia"	5:15
4.	"Dreams in the Witch-House"	5:37
5.	"Sister Najade (The Tarn by the Firs)"	4:46
6.	"The Curse of Arabia"	5:20
7.	"Kutulu!"	4:40
8.	"The Charm Is Done"	9:38

Digipak release bonus tracks
No.	Title	Length
9.	"Metropolis" (live)	5:19
10.	"Horror of Antarctica" (live)	3:44
11.	"The Grand Devilry" (live)	5:01
12.	"Deathship Symphony" (live)	6:16

=== Trivia ===
- Track 4 has its name and lyrics inspired by H. P. Lovecraft's short story "The Dreams in the Witch House".
- Tracks 6 to 8 form a trilogy based on the life of the "Mad Arab" Abdul Alhazred, the author of the fictional Necronomicon on H. P. Lovecraft's Cthulhu Mythos.

== Personnel ==
=== The Vision Bleak ===
- Ulf Theodor Schwadorf (Markus Stock) – vocals, guitars, bass, keyboards
- Allen B. Konstanz (Tobias Schönemann) – vocals, drums, keyboards

=== Guest musicians ===
- Thomas Helm – additional tenor vocals
- Sophia Brommer – additional vocals (track 5)

=== Miscellaneous staff ===
- Martin Koller – production
