= Dark Suns =

German progressive metal band

- Origin: Lutherstadt Wittenberg, Germany
- Genres: Progressive rock, progressive metal, doom metal
- Years active: 1997–present
- Label: Prophecy Productions
- Members: Maik Knappe; Niko Knappe; Torsten Wenzel; Jacob Müller; Ekkehard Meister; Dominique "Gaga" Ehlert; Evgeny Ring; Govinda Abbott
- Past members: Tobias Gommlich; Matthias Benzke; Oliver Fricke; Michael Beck; Christoph Bormann; Thomas Bremer
- Website: darksuns.de

Dark Suns is a German progressive metal band formed in 1997. It is currently composed of guitarists Maik Knappe and Torsten Wenzel, with Maik's brother Niko performing the vocals and drums. The band has released one demo, one EP, and five studio albums as of 2016.

== History ==
The band was founded in 1997 by Tobias Gommlich and Niko Knappe, two well known players of the local metal scene in Lutherstadt Wittenberg, Germany. Dark Suns was initially planned to only be a side project for Knappe and Gommlich, but they spent more and more time on it, eventually finding themselves absorbed in this "side project". In 1998 they recorded a demo called Below Dark Illusion. During that time they had numerous band member changes. Their first EP, Suffering the Psychopathic Results of Daily Blasphemy was released in 1999, and contained only one, 14-minute song.

The band began to write their first album, Swanlike, in 2001, and self-released it in 2002. In 2003, guitarist Gommlich left the band, to be replaced by Torsten Wenzel. This lineup would remain the same through the 2005 release of the band's second, album, Existence. This album showed a change in musical style, including the dropping of the death growls used in Swanlike, and a change from the death/doom style to a progressive metal style. A remastered version of Swanlike was released the same day, through Prophecy Productions.

In 2006, Christoph Bormann left the band, leaving them without a bassist. As of 2007, the band did not yet have a bassist, instead relying on Pain of Salvation's Kristoffer Gildenlöw as a session artist to perform the bass parts on the new material they were recording. Grave Human Genuine was released on 22 February 2008.

After the release of Grave Human Genuine, keyboardist Thomas Bremer left the band, with Ekkehard Meister joining the band taking over keyboard duties. Around the same time, Jacob Müller joined the band as the new bassist. With a complete band in hand, Dark Suns started work on their next album Orange, which was released in 2011. The new album explored a different direction for the band, taking on a 70's progressive rock sound. This radical departure in style is similar to what Opeth and Steven Wilson did in Heritage and Grace For Drowning respectively, both of which were released in the same year as Orange.

== Band members ==
Current members

- Niko Knappe – Vocals, Drums, Percussion (1997–present)
- Maik Knappe – Guitars, Vocals (1998–present)
- Torsten Wenzel – Guitars, Vocals (2003–present)
- Jacob Müller – Bass (2008–present)
- Ekkehard Meister – Keyboards (2008–present)
- Dominique 'Gaga' Ehlert – Drums
- Evgeny Ring – Saxophone
- Govinda Abbott – Trumpet

Former members

- Tobias Gommlich – Guitars (1997–2003)
- Matthias Benzke – Keyboards (1998)
- Oliver Fricke – Bass (1998–2001)
- Michael Beck – Bass (2000–2001)
- Christoph Bormann – Bass (2001–2006)
- Thomas Bremer – Keyboards, Samples (1998–2007)

== Discography ==
Studio albums

- Below Dark Illusion Demo (1998)
- Swanlike (2002)
- Existence (2005)
- Grave Human Genuine (2008)
- Orange (2011)
- Everchild (2016)

EP

- Suffering the Psychopathic Results of Daily Blasphemy (1999)
- Half Light Souvenirs (2019)
