= Noekk =

- Origin: Germany
- Genres: Progressive rock, doom metal
- Years active: 2004-present
- Label: Prophecy Productions
- Members: F.F. Yugoth; Funghus Baldachin

Noekk is a German progressive doom metal band that is a collaboration of two then former Empyrium members (Markus Stock, a.k.a. Ulf T. Schwadorf, and Thomas Helm). The origin of the band's name is supposed to come from a water creature that was able to transform into a beautiful white horse. When the proud stallion eventually got a human to mount it, it dashed into the dark waters and drowned the victim. According to the band, the Noekk demanded an annual human sacrifice, but this is not a part of the traditional folklore. Noekk has released four full-length albums on Prophecy Productions, and their most recent album, The White Lady was released independently in 2021.

== Line-up ==
- F.F. Yugoth (a.k.a. Markus Stock) - drums, bass, guitar
- Funghus Baldachin (a.k.a. Thomas Helm) - vocals, keyboard, guitar

== Discography ==
All albums listed below are full-length albums, except where noted.

- The Water Sprite (2005)
- The Grimalkin (2006)
- The Minstrel's Curse (2008)
- Carol Stones and Elder Rock (EP, 2018)
- Waltzing in Obscurity (2019)
- The White Lady (2021)
- Byron (2023)
- Vergessenes (2026)
