= Völur =

Canadian doom metal band

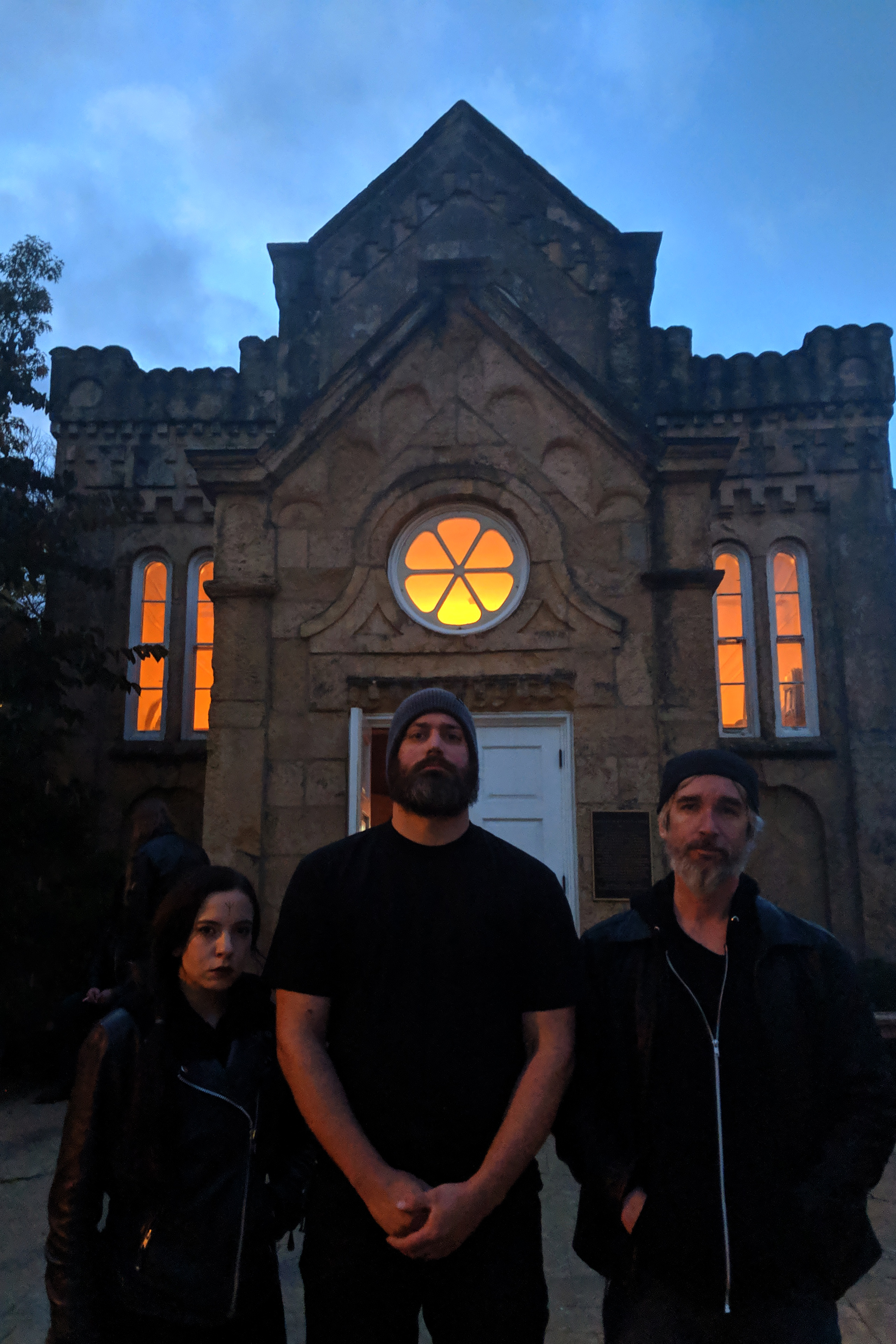
- Völur in 2018

Background information
- Origin: Toronto, Ontario, Canada
- Genres: Doom metal, Folk music, Contemporary classical music, Experimental, Free jazz
- Years active: 2014–present
- Label: Prophecy Productions
- Members: Lucas Gadke; Laura C. Bates; Justin Ruppel
- Past members: James Payment

Völur is a Canadian doom metal band based in Toronto, Ontario, signed to Prophecy Productions. Since forming in 2014 they have released two full-length albums, two EPs, one split and have toured Canada, the United States, and Europe. They play a hybrid style of doom metal and folk music while often incorporating jazz structures into their songwriting.

== History ==
Völur was formed in 2014 by Lucas Gadke (Blood Ceremony), Laura C. Bates (ex-Trent Severn), and James Payment (Do Make Say Think). Their first EP, Disir, was recorded in a single day in April 2014 by Ian Blurton and released independently. In 2015, the band signed with Germany-based Prophecy Productions and performed at Prophecy Festival in 2016 at the Stone Age Balve Cave in western Germany. Prophecy subsequently re-released Disir later the same year.

Völur released Ancestors in 2017, their first big label release. They toured the United States for the first time in 2018 along with label-mates 1476, however the tour was cut short after Bates and Gadke were badly injured falling off a collapsing balcony. Two more US tours followed in 2018 and 2019.

== Themes and influences ==
Völur's lyrical themes draw primarily from Norse mythology. Their name comes from an old Norse word (völva) which means a seeress or woman who can see into the future. Disir focuses thematically on these female Norse goddesses as told in "Voluspa: The Prophecy of the Seeress" from Poetic Edda. Their second album, Ancestors, incorporated more chamber folk and drone musical elements and thematically focused on male gods.

Musically they are influenced by doom metal, folk music, ambient music, chamber music and drone.

== Band members ==
- Lucas Gadke - Bass, vocals
- Laura C. Bates - Violin, vocals
- Justin Ruppel - Drums

== Discography ==
- Disir (2014)
- Breaker of Oaths single (2015)
- Ancestors (2017)
- Psychopomp single (2017)
- Breaker of Rings / Blood Witch split with Amber Asylum (2019)
