= The Deathship Has a New Captain =

Studio album by The Vision Bleak
- Released: 23 February 2004
- Genre: Gothic metal
- Length: 41:03
- Label: Prophecy Productions
- Producer: Martin Koller

The Vision Bleak chronology
The Vision Bleak (2003)	The Deathship Has a New Captain (2004)	Carpathia: A Dramatic Poem (2005)

The Deathship Has a New Captain (subtitled 9 Songs of Death, Doom and Horror) is the debut studio album by German gothic metal band The Vision Bleak, released on 23 February 2004 through Prophecy Productions. The album counts with a guest appearance by Dame Pandora of Dark Sanctuary fame providing additional vocals.

== Track listing ==
All tracks are written by The Vision Bleak.

No.	Title	Length
1.	"A Shadow Arose"	2:52
2.	"The Night of the Living Dead"	3:44
3.	"Wolfmoon"	5:29
4.	"Metropolis"	4:46
5.	"Elizabeth Dane"	5:07
6.	"Horror of Antarctica"	3:31
7.	"The Lone Night Rider"	5:04
8.	"The Grand Devilry"	4:46
9.	"Deathship Symphony"	5:54

=== Trivia ===
- "The Night of the Living Dead" references George A. Romero's 1968 film of the same name.
- "Wolfmoon" references the classic 1941 film The Wolf Man.
- "Metropolis" is a reference to Fritz Lang's German Expressionist 1927 film of the same name.
- "Elizabeth Dane" is the name of the clipper which plays a prominent role on John Carpenter's 1980 film The Fog.
- "Horror of Antarctica" references in its lyrics H. P. Lovecraft's 1931 novella At the Mountains of Madness.
- The album's title itself references a dialogue card in F.W. Murnau's 1922 film Nosferatu.

== Personnel ==
=== The Vision Bleak ===
- Ulf Theodor Schwadorf (Markus Stock) – vocals, guitars, bass, keyboards
- Allen B. Konstanz (Tobias Schönemann) – vocals, drums, keyboards

=== Guest musicians ===
- Otto Mellies – narrations
- Thomas Helm – additional tenor vocals
- Nadine Stock – woodwinds
- Dame Pandora – additional soprano vocals

=== Miscellaneous staff ===
- Martin Koller – production
