= Prophecy Productions =

German record label founded in 1996

- Founded: 1996
- Founder: Martin Koller
- Distributors: Soulfood (GER/AT), Alternative Distribution Alliance (US)
- Genre: Black metal, neofolk, gothic, ethereal wave, and alternative rock
- Country of origin: Germany
- Location: Zeltingen-Rachtig, Rhineland-Palatinate, Germany
- Official website: Prophecy Productions

Prophecy Productions is an international record label, founded in Germany by Martin Koller in 1996. It proclaims promoting "transcendental [...] captivating music". Its artists perform genres like gothic rock, black metal, and neofolk.

== History ==
Since 1993, Martin Koller used the moniker Prophecy for his small, self-operated mail-order business. According to him, the actual birth of Prophecy Productions as a label was the release of the album A Wintersunset... by Empyrium. While this record was intended to be the sole release under the name of Prophecy, the success of it encouraged Koller to continue the label.

In 1998, Autumnblaze was signed, a new band with musicians from Paragon of Beauty, as well as Sun of the Sleepless, the side project of Markus Stock from Empyrium. Throughout Prophecy's history, there are many more collaborations of that kind between the label and new projects or bands.

Also in 1998, the place of business was moved from Wittlich to nearby Zeltingen-Rachtig, and a long-term cooperation was decided on with Markus Stock and his recording studio Klangschmiede Studio E to ensure a continuous high standard for Prophecy's music productions. In the same year, Prophecy put out Hallavedet, the first official release by progressive folk band Tenhi. The Finnish group quickly became one of the most popular artists on Prophecy and is currently (as of December 2014) still signed to the label.

In 1999, Prophecy announced contracts with the established and renowned bands In the Woods... and Bethlehem. Those were two A&r-coups which put significantly more attention on the label and heightened its status.

The next signing was that of Dornenreich in 2000, whose label-debut Her von welken Nächten (2001) ranks amongst the most successful releases in Prophecy's history. Likewise, Dornenreich have stayed loyal ever since and belong to the label's figureheads.

The year 2002 saw Prophecy emerge as a book publisher as well, the first release being the German translation of the book Lords of Chaos by Michael Moynihan and Didrik Søderlind. In 2005, they released the book Looking for Europe, a history of Apocalyptic Folk by Andreas Diesel and Dieter Gerten. In the meantime, Index Verlag continues the book-publishing business.

In 2003, The Vision Bleak were signed, who have played a major role in the label's history. For their debut The Deathship Has a New Captain, Prophecy succeeded in convincing renowned German actor and voice actor Otto Mellies of a collaboration. The band's second album Carpathia - A Dramatic Poem became one of the biggest sellers for the label. With their third record The Wolves Go Hunt Their Prey, the group entered German Media Control charts for the first time. The following albums Set Sail to Mystery and Witching Hour did this as well.

In 2007, Alcest was signed, which became Prophecy's most successful band as years went by. Alcest's ambitious fourth album Shelter was recorded on Iceland with Sigur Rós' producer Birgir Jón Birgisson and features Neil Halstead, leader of Shoegazing-veterans Slowdive, as guest musician. Shelter marked the so-far highest chart entry of a Prophecy-artist (#28), surpassed to years later by Kodama. Amongst multiple entries in Germany, USA, Finland and Norway, Alcest are the only band on the label who not only tour Europe and North America, but also South America, Asia and Australia. Alcest belong to the most prominent representers of Shoegaze Metal. Due to their ongoing work with Alcest and groups such as Les Discrets or Lantlôs, Prophecy play a crucial role in this scene.

2010 saw the release of the compilation Whom the Moon a Nightsong Sings on Prophecy's sublabel Auerbach Tonträger as a double album putting together many established and new artists from the field of nature-related Folk music with exclusive songs. This sampler also announced the reunion of Empyrium, who were on temporary hiatus, in the shape of the track The Days Before the Fall.

Eventually, Empyrium put Prophecy into public awareness for the first time due to the label's economic success: In 2011, it was awarded with the so-called Silver Award by European independent label association IMPALA for the first three Empyrium-albums, meaning that they have sold 20.000 copies within Europe each. One year later, Prophecy also received Impala Silver Awards for albums by Dornenreich, The Vision Bleak, Alcest and Sol Invictus.

2014 was the first time Prophecy were featured with two releases simultaneously in the Media Control charts: Empyrium's The Turn of the Tides and 1994 – 2014, a vinyl boxset.

In 2017, founder Martin Koller adopted Los Angeles as his second home and today uses the City of Angels as the epicenter for Prophecy's foray into America. Metal industry veteran Rayshele Teige, who is based in L.A. works alongside Koller in California.

In 2020, Summerland by Dutch rock band Dool marked the first top-ten entry of a Prophecy act in Germany at #9 and #5 (vinyl).

In 2021, Prophecy started its 25th anniversary celebration by collaborating with Venus Principle, Magma and Arthur Brown (in collaboration with Magnetic Eye Records) as well as several other acts while further cultivating its roster.

== Concept ==
On their admission, it is Prophecy's underlying idea to release "wayside atmospheric music which defies categorization." The label is grounded on the three pillars constancy (long term collaborations with its artists, close relations to clients and fans), quality (lush editions with special production, layout and design) and community (multiple cooperations among Prophecy-artists, intimate relationship with fans).

Prophecy accompany many of their artists from their first records on and release the musicians' entire work.

== Stylistic direction and sub-labels ==
Even with their first releases, Prophecy displayed a large amount of stylistical diversity. Empyrium's A Wintersunset... offered tuneful, romantic Metal with Folk influences, Nox Mortis' Im Schatten des Hasses obscure doom metal, Penitent's Melancholia a combination of dark wave and neoclassical dark wave, Oberon's Oberon avantgardistic Pop, and Nærvær's Nærvær psychedelic acoustic music. This diversity and unpredictability have always been cherished by the label and became its trademark. Thanks to its unconventional and selective approach when it comes to signing artists as well as the resulting originality of the music published, Prophecy have grown to be a "quality label" among media and fans alike.

To help customers, press and distribution partners to classify Prophecy's stylistically diverse repertoire, the sub-labels Lupus Lounge and Auerbach Tonträger were founded in 2003. While Lupus Lounge primarily is a platform for cooperation with musicians rooted in extreme metal, Auerbach Tonträger is principally devoted to styles of music that, because of predominantly acoustic arrangements and a more tranquil nature, can be described as contemporary folk in the widest sense of the word.

Even though one can see a focus on unconventional, atmospheric Metal and melancholic, nature-related acoustic music in Prophecy's artist roster, the label's palette encompasses genres such as progressive rock, pop, indie rock, shoegaze, singer-songwriter, electronica, neofolk, ambient or neoclassic.

== Prophecy Konzertnächte and further live activities ==
In 1999, Prophecy Productions organised their first label festival under the name "Prophecy Konzertnacht" ("concert night"). It took place on 20 November in Leiwen at the river Moselle and featured concerts by Paragon of Beauty, Nox Mortis and the so-far only one by Sun of the Sleepless. In May 2001, another batch of concert nights followed in Zweibrücken, Bielefeld and Erfurt, where Dornenreich, Blazing Eternity and Mysterium played. In 2006, a Prophecy concert night coincided with the label's tenth anniversary and took place in Zeltingen-Rachtig. There, Dornenreich gave their first concert in four years, and The Vision Bleak offered one of their rare performances with the classical ensemble The Shadow Philharmonics.

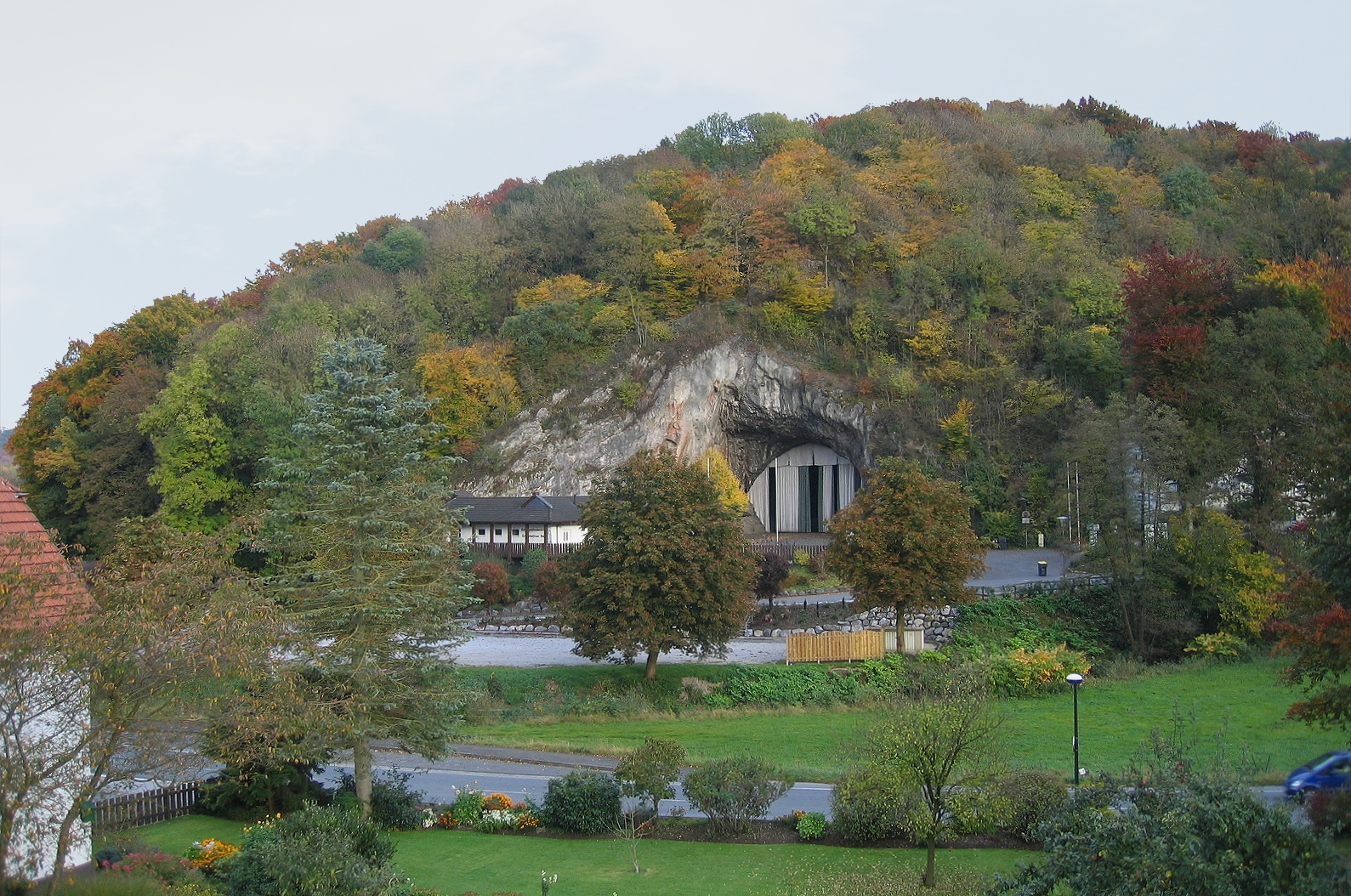
Balver Höhle

Nine years passed, and in 2015 an edition titled Prophecy Fest followed which took place in a natural cave from Old Stone Age located in Balve, Germany. After a successful one-day festival in the Balve Cave (German: Balver Höhle), Prophecy decided to extend the festival to last two days in 2016 and 2017. In 2018, for the first time, an edition of Prophecy Fest in the US featured Alcest, Völur and more in the Williamsburg neighborhood of New York City. 2019 saw another German edition, with a 25th anniversary edition to follow in September 2021.

Prophecy has been organizing tours since 2001 (for Dornenreich, The 3rd and the Mortal, Antimatter, The Vision Bleak and Bethlehem, among others), as well as conducting impressive one-off concerts by Empyrium in Christuskirche Bochum and Passionskirche Berlin.

== Roster ==
=== Current Prophecy Productions bands ===
- 1476
- Alternative 4
- Amber Asylum
- Antimatter
- Arcturus
- Arthur Brown
- Bethlehem
- Coven
- Darkher
- Deine Lakaien
- Disillusion
- Dool
- Dornenreich
- Eight Bells
- E-L-R
- Empyrium
- Eye Of Nix
- Falkenbach
- Fvnerals
- Germ
- GlerAkur
- Illudium
- Iron Mountain
- Isenordal
- Kall
- Katla.
- Kayo Dot
- Klimt 1918
- Lantlôs
- Laster
- Les Discrets
- Lifelover
- Lotus Thief
- LowCityRain
- Magma
- Nochnoy Dozor
- Noêta
- Novembers Doom
- Nucleus Torn
- Pencey Sloe
- Silence in the Snow
- Slagmaur
- Soror Dolorosa
- Sunset in the 12th House
- Tengil
- Tenhi
- The Dark Red Seed
- The Mystery of the Bulgarian Voices feat. Lisa Gerrard
- The Vision Bleak
- Thief
- Unreqvited
- Vemod
- Völur
- Year of the Cobra

=== Current Lupus Lounge bands ===
- A Forest of Stars
- Aureole
- Dordeduh
- Drown
- Farsot
- Fauna
- Fen
- Fortíð
- Helrunar
- Imha Tarikat
- Nachtmystium
- Negură Bunget
- Nhor
- Perchta
- Secrets of the Moon
- Silencer
- Strid
- Sun of the Sleepless
- Tchornobog
- Twilight
- Valborg
- Vuur & Zijde
- Xasthur

=== Current Auerbach Tonträger bands ===
- Camerata Mediolanense
- Fräkmündt
- Hekate
- Ian Read
- Moon Far Away
- Orplid
- Sol Invictus
- Spiritual Front
- St. Michael Front
- Stille Volk
- The Moon and the Nightspirit
- Vàli
- Vrîmuot
- Wöljager

=== Past Prophecy Productions bands ===
- Antimatter
- Arcane Art
- Arctic Plateau
- Autumnblaze
- Alcest
- Blazing Eternity
- Canaan
- Crowhurst
- Dark Suns
- Din Brad
- Drautran
- Drawn
- Duncan Evans
- Eïs
- Elend
- Ewigheim
- Finnr's Cane
- Gae Bolg
- Green Carnation
- In the Woods...
- Kari
- Khôrada
- Leakh
- Mysterium
- Nachtmahr
- Naervaer
- Nàttsòl
- Neun Welten
- Noekk
- Nox Mortis
- Oberon
- Of the Wand & the Moon
- Paragon of Beauty
- Penitent
- Sleeping Pulse
- Sonnentau
- Subaudition
- The 3rd and the Mortal
- The Loveless
- Todesbonden

== See also ==
- List of record labels
