= 2011 in heavy metal music =

This is a timeline documenting the events of heavy metal in the year 2011.

== Bands disbanded ==
- Ark
- Dawn of Retribution
- Devian
- Dismember
- Elexorien
- The Famine
- Five Star Prison Cell
- God Dethroned
- Haste the Day
- Hell Within
- Jag Panzer
- Lifelover
- Ludicra
- Machine Men
- Metalium
- Oceans of Sadness
- Symphorce

== Bands reformed ==
- At the Gates
- Black Sabbath
- Coal Chamber
- I Killed the Prom Queen
- Ministry
- Morgion
- Nocte Obducta
- Still Remains
- System of a Down

== Events ==
- April – Keyboardist Per Wiberg leaves Opeth as "part of a mutual decision with the band", after finishing recording.
- 5 June – New Zealand authorities confiscate Cradle of Filth's T-shirts which depict a nude nun and the words "Jesus Is A Cunt".
- 17 June –Coroner played one of their first reunion shows during Hellfest, June 17–19, 2011 in Clisson, France.
- Judas Priest begin their Epitaph World Tour. Despite this, the band insist that they are not going to break up. However, founding member K. K. Downing later retires from the band. Judas Priest also stated "Having thought long and hard about how to proceed, Rob, Glenn, Ian and Scott unanimously agreed that they should go ahead with the tour and not let the fans down around the world". Thirty-one-year-old British guitar player Richie Faulkner was announced as the replacement, but the press release did not state if it is on a permanent basis.
- Morgoth begin a festival tour to celebrate the 20th anniversary of their 1991 album, Cursed.
- Slipknot launch their first tour without bassist Paul Gray, who died in May 2010. This
- Acid Reign release their remasters of Moshkinstein, The Fear and Obnoxious on January 17, 2011 on CD and digital download. All remastered by the Bill Metoyer.
- Former Dream Theater drummer Mike Portnoy forms an as-yet-unnamed project with Steve Morse (Dixie Dregs, Kansas, Deep Purple), Neal Morse (Spock's Beard), Casey McPherson (Alpha Rev, Endochine) and Dave LaRue (Steve Morse, Dixie Dregs). Portnoy is also touring with a Beatles cover band called Yellow Matter Custard.
- Warbringer's drummer and founding member Nic Ritter leaves the band.
- Bury Your Dead announces the departure of Myke Terry and return of Mat Bruso.
- On January 8, 2011 22-year-old Jared Lee Loughner was arrested for shooting and killing six bystanders in Tucson, Arizona, and injuring 14 others. The Washington Post noted that Loughner's YouTube channel had only one clip; a fan-made music video for the controversial Drowning Pool song titled "Bodies." Other members of the media also suggested that his music tastes affected his behavior, including political commentator Rush Limbaugh who was quoted saying, "The guy listened to heavy metal, and some of that anarchist stuff. We're dealing with an insane individual." Drowning Pool responded to these allegations by claiming that the song was written about the camaraderie seen in mosh pits, and is in no way a violent song.
- The original long-running guitarist for Dutch metal band Vengeance died due to a heart attack at his home in Mierlo, The Netherlands.
- Doom metal band Cathedral have announced they will disband after releasing another album in 2012.
- Slayer guitarist Jeff Hanneman contracted necrotizing fasciitis, and underwent emergency surgery on his right arm. On Saturday April 23, Jeff Hanneman made a surprise stage return in Indio, CA. He came out during the 2 song encore unannounced, and delighted a crowd of roughly 50,000. Jeff commented afterwards that, "I'm the happiest man in the world."
- Iron Maiden wins their first Grammy award in the category of Best Metal Performance for the song "El Dorado" from their latest album The Final Frontier.
- Nevermore bassist Jim Sheppard went under a brain surgery to remove a "benign brain tumor".
- Blinded Colony changed their band name once again (previously Stigmata) to The Blinded.
- After searching for over a year, DragonForce founded 23-year-old Marc Hudson as their new vocalist.
- Vocalist Matt Barlow leaves Iced Earth again for personal reasons.
- Vocalist Anette Olzon of Nightwish broke a couple ribs from slipping on her son's toys.
- Niclas Engelin, officially rejoins In Flames.
- The Red Chord once again parts ways with their drummer Michael Justian.
- Corey Taylor has announced that Slipknot would not be recording for a while due to bassist Paul Gray's death. He said to Undercover.com.au, "I don't see it happening. And if it does, it'll be way way down the line. There is a such a huge piece missing now. A piece so huge that the fans can't even understand." Slipknot have also announced their bass guitar touring replacement is their original guitarist Donnie Steele.
- Paul Di'Anno (ex -Iron Maiden) was charged with 8 counts of benefits fraud of £45,000 (€53,000, $72,000). He claimed to have nerve damage in his back and the Department for Work and Pensions got a tip from an anonymous tipper who said he was jumping around on stage. The Department for Work and Pensions gave him four and a half months in jail and took his property. He was released from jail in March 2011.
- Origin recruited Jason Keyser (Skinless) as their new vocalist.
- Manowar cause a blackout in Cleveland, Ohio, United States while performing a sound-check on March 11. A whole city block lost electricity and was not back in service for another 24 hours. Manowar had backup generators so the show was able to continue.
- Iced Earth announced their replacement for Matt Barlow as Stu Block (Into Eternity).
- Aspera were forced to change their band name to Above Symmetry due to a lawsuit over right to the name by American indie rock band Aspera.
- Legion of the Damned guitarist Richard Ebisch left the band due to health issues.
- Shining announced the departure of guitarist Fredric Gråby, and his replacement as temporary bassist Christian Larsson who is also now announced as a full-time member.
- Nevermore announced the departure of original members Jeff Loomis and Van Williams.
- After some speculation, Kamelot vocalist Roy Khan announced his departure from the band.
- Sinister parted ways with drummer Edwin van den Eeden, guitarist Alex Paul, and bassist Joost van der Graaf. Three days later Sinister announces Toep Duin on drums, guitarist Bastiaan Brussaard, and bassist/guitarist Dennis Hartog.
- ICS Vortex returned to Borknagar as a second vocalist.
- Dream Theater announced their replacement for Mike Portnoy as Mike Mangini (ex-Steve Vai, ex-Extreme, ex-Annihilator).
- IWrestledABearOnce changed their genre to black metal as a joke.
- Jon Levasseur rejoined Cryptopsy for work on their upcoming record.
- Bison B.C. part ways with original drummer Brad McKinnon.
- X Japan released Jade, their first worldwide single.
- Lead vocalist Keith Caputo of alternative metal band Life of Agony changed her name to Keith Mina Caputo, and her gender from male to female.
- Mayhem bassist Necrobutcher appeared on Norwegian television station NRK, to exorcise the demon within himself.
- Tarja Turunen announced her participation in a new musical group, entitled "Harus".
- A reporter from England's Birmingham Mail erroneously announced that Black Sabbath would reunite to write a new album based on an off-the-record statement made months prior by Tony Iommi. In his statement denouncing the reformation of the band, Iommi said he was just "shooting the breeze" with the reporter and the band is not reforming.
- Roadrunner Records has announced they have signed progressive rock outfit Rush.
- Skitzo performed at the Phoenix Theater in Petaluma, California, for their 30th anniversary on October 8.
- After 23 years of playing, Dismember decided to call it quits on October 15, 2011.
- Original vocalist of Exhorder Kyle Thomas and guitarist Jay Ceravolo quit the band. Kyle also stated "I wish all of my brothers involved well and good luck in whatever the future brings them, whether or not Exhorder continues."
- Frontman, guitarist and founding member Helmuth Lehner (Belphegor) had "a serious and difficult operation", and therefore Belphegor ceased all activity until May 2012.
- After 13 years with the band, guitarist Johan Hallgren leaves Pain of Salvation to focus on his family-life.
- Decapitated survive an emergency plane landing in Warsaw. They were flying back to Poland from the United States, when they needed to make an emergency landing when the landing gear failed to operate. They have also cancelled all forthcoming festival dates.
- The two guitarists Matt DeVries and Rob Arnold of heavy metal outfit Chimaira announced their departure of the band. They are replaced by Jeremy Creamer (Dååth) on bass guitar and Matt Szlachta (ex-Dirge Within) on rhythm guitar.
- Power Quest announced new front-man/vocalist Colin Callanan.
- Drummer Paul Bostaph left Testament, and started a collaboration with ex-Anthrax vocalist Dan Nelson.
- Darkest Hour replaced their drummer Ryan Parrish with Timothy Java (ex-Dead to Fall).
- Cannabis Corpse lost their two members; vocalist Andy "Weedgrinder" Horn and guitarist Nick "Nikropolis" Poulos.
- Blood Red Throne announced vocalist Yngve Bolt Christiansen (Goddamn) and bassist Erlend Caspersen (Horizon Ablaze) as their newest members.

== Deaths ==
- January 7 – Phil Kennemore, bassist of Y&T, died from lung cancer at the age of 57.
- January 13 – Dirk "Strahli" Strahlmeier, former guitarist of Sodom, died of complications from a drug overdose.
- January 17 – Didier Bernoussi, former guitarist of Warning, died from undisclosed reasons at the age of 54.
- January 28 – Jan Somers, guitarist of Vengeance, died from a heart attack at the age of 46.
- February 6 – Gary Moore, former guitarist of Thin Lizzy, died from a heart attack while on holiday in Spain at the age of 58.
- February 17 – Phil Vane, former vocalist of Extreme Noise Terror and Napalm Death, died from a stroke at the age of 46.
- March 8 – Michael Christopher "Mike" Starr, former bassist of Alice in Chains, died from a prescription drug overdose at the age of 44.
- March 22 – Frankie Sparcello, bassist of Exhorder, died from undisclosed reasons at the age of 40.
- April 4 – Scott Columbus, former drummer of Manowar, died by suicide at the age of 54.
- April 20 – Matt LaPorte, former guitarist of Circle II Circle and Jon Oliva's Pain, died from undisclosed reasons at the age of 40.
- June 11 – Seth Putnam, vocalist of Anal Cunt, died from a heart attack at the age of 43.
- June 13 – Mario Comesanas, DJ for Liquid Metal and writer for Revolver, died from a sudden brain hemorrhage at the age of 30.
- July 9 – Michael Burston (a.k.a. Würzel), guitarist of Motörhead, died from ventricular fibrillation triggered by cardiomyopathy at the age of 61.
- July 17 – Taiji Sawada, former bassist of X Japan and Loudness, died from complications arising from a suicide attempt at the age of 45.
- August 3 – Andrew McDermott, former vocalist of Threshold, died from kidney failure after being in a four-day coma at the age of 45.
- August 11 – Jani Lane, former lead vocalist of Warrant, died from alcohol poisoning at the age of 47.
- September 9 – Jonas Bergqvist (a.k.a. B), guitarist and vocalist of Lifelover died of unknown causes at the age of 25.
- September 21 – John Du Cann, former guitarist, bassist and vocalist of Atomic Rooster, died from a heart attack at the age of 65.
- November 2 – Cory Smoot (a.k.a. Flattus Maximus), guitarist of Gwar, died from a coronary artery thrombosis brought about by his pre-existing coronary artery disease at the age of 34.
- December 22 – David Gold, guitarist and vocalist of Woods of Ypres, died in a car accident near Barrie, ON, Canada at the age of 31.

== Films ==
- Nightwish is releasing a movie entitled Imaginaerum the same as their upcoming album. In a press release they described it as "a music fantasy – film based on the forthcoming Nightwish album of the same title and its 13 songs. The protagonist of the film is a songwriter with an otherworldly imagination. He is an old man who still thinks he's a young boy. While asleep he travels into his distant past where his dreams of old come back to him mixed to the young boy's world of fantasy and music. In his dreams the old man fights to find the memories most important to him."

== Albums released ==
=== January ===
Day	Artist	Album
1	Universum	Mortuus Machina
7	Axenstar	Aftermath
7	Legion of the Damned	Descent Into Chaos
11	Anal Cunt	Fuckin' A
11	Kryoburn	Three Years Eclipsed
11	Megasus	Menace Of The Universe
12	myGRAIN	myGRAIN
12	Stratovarius	Elysium
14	Belphegor	Blood Magick Necromance
17	Desultory	Counting Our Scars
17	Silent Stream of Godless Elegy	Návaz
18	Times of Grace	The Hymn of a Broken Man
19	Architects	The Here and Now
21	Sirenia	The Enigma of Life
21	Mr. Big	What If...
24	Allfader	Black Blood Flux
25	The Bronx Casket Co.	Antihero
25	Ulcerate	The Destroyers of All
26	Battlelore	Doombound
26	Hibria	Blind Ride
26	Power Quest	Blood Alliance
28	Onslaught	Sounds Of Violence
31	Macabre	Grim Scary Tales
31	Six Feet Under	Wake The Night! Live in Germany (DVD)

=== February ===
Day	Artist	Album
1	Abysmal Dawn	Leveling The Plane of Existence
1	Full Blown Chaos	Full Blown Chaos
1	Thomas Giles	Pulse
1	Lazarus A.D.	Black Rivers Flow
1	Most Precious Blood	Do Not Resuscitate
1	Red	Until We Have Faces
1	Stryper	The Covering (cover album)
2	Ajattara	Murhat
4	Korpiklaani	Ukon Wacka
7	Vreid	V
8	Crowbar	Sever the Wicked Hand
9	Kypck	Lower
10	The Eternal	Under a New Sun
12	Aurora Borealis	Timeline: The Beginning And End Of Everything
14	Ava Inferi	Onyx
14	Cauldron	Burning Fortune
14	Dornenreich	Flammentriebe
14	Lifelover	Sjukdom
14	The Project Hate	Bleeding The New Apocalypse (Cum Victriciis In Manibus Armis)
15	Deicide	To Hell with God
15	Dr. Acula	Slander
15	Emmure	Speaker of the Dead
15	The Famine	The Architects of Guilt
15	Impiety	Worshippers of the Seventh Tyranny
15	Impiety	Advent of... (EP)
15	Neuraxis	Asylon
15	Orchid	Capricorn
15	Ralf Scheepers	Scheepers
15	Svartsyn	Wrath Upon the Earth
16	Coldrain	The Enemy Inside
18	Benedictum	Dominion
18	Betzefer	Freedom to the Slave Makers
18	Dalriada	Ígéret
19	Tygers of Pan Tang	The Spellbound Sessions (EP)
21	Long Distance Calling	Long Distance Calling
21	Moonsorrow	Varjoina Kuljemme Kuolleiden Maassa
22	Darkest Hour	The Human Romance
22	DevilDriver	Beast
22	Earth	Angels of Darkness, Demons of Light I
22	Evergrey	Glorious Collision
22	Ravens Creed	Nestless and Wild (EP)
23	Dia De Los Muertos	Satánico Dramático
23	Turisas	Stand Up and Fight
25	Before the Dawn	Deathstar Rising
25	Deadlock	Bizarro World
25	Die Apokalyptischen Reiter	Moral And Wahnsinn
25	Doomsword	The Eternal Battle
25	Mercenary	Metamorphosis
25	Nightmare	One Night of Insurrection (live DVD/CD)
25	One Man Army and the Undead Quartet	The Dark Epic
25	Serenity	Death & Legacy
25	Thunderbolt	Dung Idols
25	Visions of Atlantis	Delta
25	Wolfchant	Call of the Black Winds
28	Destruction	Day Of Reckoning
28	Jag Panzer	The Scourge of the Light

=== March ===
Day	Artist	Album
1	Grayceon	AII We Destroy
1	Omnium Gatherum	New World Shadows
1	Scale the Summit	The Collective
1	Weedeater	Jason...The Dragon
2	Children of Bodom	Relentless Reckless Forever
3	Rudra	Brahmavidya: Immortal I
4	Agnostic Front	My Life My Way
4	Grave Digger	Ballad Of Mary (EP)
7	Burzum	Fallen
7	Grave Digger	The Clans Are Still Marching (live DVD/CD)
8	The Amenta	VO1d (EP)
8	The Human Abstract	Digital Veil
8	Scott Weinrich	Adrift
11	Negură Bunget	Focul Viu (DVD)
11	Sylosis	Edge of the Earth
15	Cage	The Rise to Power (DVD)
15	Cannibal Corpse	Global Evisceration (DVD)
15	Mastodon	Live At The Aragon (live CD/DVD)
15	Rotten Sound	Cursed
15	Salt the Wound	Kill the Crown
15	Trap Them	Darker Handcraft
17	The Moon and the Nightspirit	Mohalepte
18	Avantasia	The Flying Opera
18	Bloodbound	Unholy Cross
18	Mindflow	With Bare Hands
18	Tokyo Blade	Thousand Men Strong
18	U.D.O.	Rev Raptor
21	Benighted	Asylum Cave
21	Artillery	My Blood
21	The Haunted	Unseen
21	Soundgarden	Live on I-5 (live)
22	Born of Osiris	The Discovery
22	Eyehategod	Live (DVD)
22	Protest the Hero	Scurrilous
22	TesseracT	One
25	Chaos Divine	The Human Connection
25	Debauchery	Germany's Next Death Metal
25	Divinefire	Eye of the Storm
25	Imperia	Secret Passion
25	Kampfar	Mare
25	Suidakra	Book of Dowth
25	Vintersorg	Jordpuls
25	Whitesnake	Forevermore
25	Within Temptation	The Unforgiving
25	Wizard	...Of Wariwulfs and Bluotvarwes
28	Vicious Rumors	Razorback Killers
28	Blackfield	Welcome to my DNA
29	Aiden	Disguises
29	Amon Amarth	Surtur Rising
29	Becoming the Archetype	Celestial Completion
29	Between the Buried and Me	Best Of (compilation album)
29	Blackguard	Firefight
29	Cavalera Conspiracy	Blunt Force Trauma
29	Obscura	Omnivium
29	Alex Skolnick	Alex Skolnick Trio
31	Detonation	Reprisal

=== April ===
Day	Artist	Album
1	Illdisposed	There Is Light (But It's Not For Me)
1	Saltatio Mortis	Wild and Free (DVD)
1	Sons of Seasons	Magnisphyricon
1	Symfonia	In Paradisum
5	Glen Drover	Metalusion
5	Voivod	Warriors of Ice (live album)
5	Asking Alexandria	Reckless and Relentless
9	Wolfsbane	Did It for the Money (EP)
11	Believer	Transhuman
12	Last Chance to Reason	Level 2
12	Pentagram	Last Rites
12	Between the Buried and Me	The Parallax: Hypersleep Dialogues
13	Norther	Circle Regenerated
15	Pegazus	In Metal We Trust
15	Scar Symmetry	The Unseen Empire
15	WarCry	Alfa
18	Behemoth	Abyssus Abyssum Invocat (2-CD set)
18	Blut Aus Nord	777 – Sect(s)
18	Cruachan	Blood on the Black Robe
18	Loudblast	Frozen Moments Between Life And Death
18	Panzerchrist	Regiment Ragnarok
18	Septic Flesh	The Great Mass
19	Leaves' Eyes	Melusine (EP)
19	Periphery	Icarus Lives (EP)
19	Winds of Plague	Against the World
22	Krypteria	All Beauty Must Die
22	Leaves' Eyes	Meredead
22	Midnattsol	The Metamorphosis Melody
22	While Heaven Wept	Fear Of Infinity
24	Pestilence	Doctrine
25	Above Symmetry	Ripples (re-issue)
25	Bloodbath	Bloodbath over Bloodstock (DVD)
25	Gallhammer	The End
25	Skindred	Union Black
25	Negură Bunget	Poartă De Dincolo (EP)
25	Yggdrasil	Irrbloss
25	Wolf	Legions Of Bastards
26	Catalepsy	Bleed
26	Deafheaven	Roads to Judah
26	Destrophy	Cry Havoc
26	Endwell	Punishment
26	Hope for the Dying	Dissimulation
26	Krallice	Diotima
26	Otep	Atavist
26	Primordial	Redemption at the Puritan's Hand
26	Texas in July	One Reality
26	Vomitory	Opus Mortis VIII
27	Poisonblack	Drive
27	Ulver	Wars of the Roses
29	Lake of Tears	Illwill
29	Christian Müenzner	Timewarp
29	Samael	Lux Mundi
29	Trollfest	En Kvest For Den Hellige Gral

=== May ===
Day	Artist	Album
2	Daedalus	Motherland
3	Black Label Society	The Song Remains Not the Same
3	Poison	Double Dose: Ultimate Hits (compilation)
3	Uriah Heep	Into the Wild
3	Wormrot	Dirge
3	Xerath	II
5	Riverside	Memories in My Head (EP)
6	Caliban	Coverfield (EP)
6	Chrome Division	Third Round Knockout
10	Anvil	Juggernaut of Justice
10	Enslaved	The Sleeping Gods (EP)
10	The Gates of Slumber	The Wretch
10	Hate Eternal	Phoenix Amongst The Ashes
10	Novembers Doom	Aphotic
12	3 Inches of Blood	Anthems for the Victorious (EP)
13	Deceased	Surreal Overdose
13	Stormwarrior	Heathen Warrior
16	Endstille	Infektion 1813
16	Necrophagia	Deathtrip 69
16	Ramesses	Chrome Pineal
16	The Soulless	Isolated
17	A Storm of Light	As the Valley of Death Becomes Us, Our Silver Memories Fade
17	Altar of Plagues	Mammal
17	Anaal Nathrakh	Passion
17	Arsonists Get All the Girls	Motherland
20	HammerFall	Infected
20	Pagan's Mind	Heavenly Ecstasy
20	MaYaN	Quarterpast
20	Peste Noire	L'Ordure à l'état Pur
23	Gorod	Transcendence (EP)
23	Iron Maiden	From Fear to Eternity (compilation)
23	Wolverine	Communication Lost
24	Cave In	White Silence
24	Devolved	Oblivion
24	Haemorrhage	Hospital Carnage
24	Inevitable End	The Oculus
25	Shining	Född Förlorare
27	Am I Blood	Existence of Trauma
27	Amorphis	The Beginning of Times
27	Marduk	Iron Dawn (EP)
27	Omega Lithium	Kinetik
27	Týr	The Lay of Thrym
30	Arkona	Stenka Na Stenku (EP)
31	Autopsy	Macabre Eternal
31	Gamma Ray	Skeletons & Majesties (compilation)
31	Unexpect	Fables of the Sleepless Empire

=== June ===
Day	Artist	Album
1	Achilles	Spittin' On A Unicorn (EP)
1	Insision	End of All (EP)
3	Alestorm	Back Through Time
3	Falconer	Armod
3	Pain	You Only Live Twice
3	Saxon	Call to Arms
3	Seven Witches	Call Upon the Wicked
6	Abruptum	Potestates Apocalypsis (EP)
6	Azarath	Blasphemer's Maledictions
6	Doctor Midnight & The Mercy Cult	I Declare: Treason
6	Morbid Angel	Illud Divinum Insanus
6	Short Sharp Shock	Problems to the Answer
7	Arch Enemy	Khaos Legions
7	Def Leppard	Mirrorball (live)
7	Job for a Cowboy	Gloom (EP)
7	Origin	Entity
7	Sister	Hated
7	The Soulless	Isolated
7	Tombs	Path of Totality
7	Touché Amoré	Parting the Sea Between Brightness and Me
13	Black Veil Brides	Set the World on Fire
14	Freedom Call	Live In Hellvetia (DVD)
14	Of Mice & Men	The Flood
15	In Flames	Sounds of a Playground Fading
17	Rhapsody of Fire	From Chaos to Eternity
17	Sun Caged	The Lotus Effect
17	Symphony X	Iconoclast
18	Antagonist A.D.	Old Bones Make New Blooms (EP)
20	Fullforce	One
20	The Devin Townsend Project	Deconstruction
20	The Devin Townsend Project	Ghost
21	Ancestors	Invisible White (EP)
21	August Burns Red	Leveler
21	The Black Dahlia Murder	Ritual
21	The Crimson Armada	Conviction
21	Jungle Rot	Kill on Command
21	Tony MacAlpine	Tony MacAlpine
21	Ramesses	Possessed by the Rise of Magick
21	Slayer	Dead Skin Mask (DVD)
21	Sourvein	Black Fangs
22	Stream of Passion	Darker Days
23	Draconian	A Rose for the Apocalypse
24	Running Wild	The Final Jolly Roger (DVD)
24	Sepultura	Kairos
27	Iced Earth	Festivals of the Wicked (DVD)
27	Sarah Jezebel Deva	The Corruption of Mercy
27	Limp Bizkit	Gold Cobra
28	Aenaon	Cendres Et Sang
28	Evan Brewer	Alone
28	Kittie	Take It or Leave It: A Tribute to the Queens of Noise
28	Queensrÿche	Dedicated to Chaos
28	Riverside	Memories in My Head (EP)
30	Blood Stain Child	Εpsilon

=== July ===
Day	Artist	Album
1	Agora (MX)	Regresa Al Vértigo
1	Lock Up	Necropolis Transparent
1	Stonelake	Marching On Timeless Tales
3	Exhumed	All Guts, No Glory
5	Hands	Give Me Rest
5	Pop Evil	War of Angels
5	Unearth	Darkness in the Light
6	ChthoniC	Takasago Army
12	Decapitated	Carnival Is Forever
12	Earth Crisis	Neutralize the Threat
12	Fair to Midland	Arrows and Anchors
12	Icon in Me	Head Break Solution
12	Sleeping Giant	Kingdom Days in an Evil Age
12	Suicide Silence	The Black Crown
12	Theory of a Deadman	The Truth Is...
12	Ringworm	Scars
15	Malefice	Awaken the Tides
15	Manilla Road	Playground of the Damned
16	Metallica	Live at Quebec City (DVD)
19	Chelsea Grin	My Damnation
19	Cold	Superfiction
19	Dying Fetus	History Repeats... (covers EP)
19	Toxic Holocaust	Conjure and Command
22	Communic	The Bottom Deep
26	All Shall Perish	This Is Where It Ends
26	Falling in Reverse	The Drug in Me Is You
26	Iwrestledabearonce	Ruining It for Everybody
26	Jamey Jasta	Jasta
26	The Quill	Full Circle
26	World Under Blood	Tactical
27	Svartsot	Maledictus Eris
28	Meliah Rage	Dead To The World
29	Powerwolf	Blood of the Saints
31	Welicoruss	Kharna (EP)

=== August ===
Day	Artist	Album
2	Bury Your Dead	Mosh 'N' Roll
2	Dead and Divine	Antimacy
2	Dir En Grey	Dum Spiro Spero
2	It Prevails	Stroma
5	Sabaton	World War Live: Battle of the Baltic Sea (live)
9	Adrenaline Mob	Adrenaline Mob (EP)
9	Diamond Plate	Generation Why?
9	Fleshgod Apocalypse	Agony
9	Goreaphobia	Apocalyptic Necromancy
9	Trivium	In Waves
12	Vader	Welcome to the Morbid Reich
16	Attila	Outlawed
16	All Pigs Must Die	God Is War
16	Chimaira	The Age of Hell
16	Dirge Within	Absolution (EP)
16	NIHM	Trade Of Chains
16	Revocation	Chaos of Forms
16	Yob	Atma
19	Ghost Brigade	Until Fear No Longer Defines Us
20	Corrupted	Garten der Unbewusstheit
22	ICS Vortex	Storm Seeker
22	Leprous	Bilateral
23	Black Tide	Post Mortem
23	Jørn Lande	Live in Black (live)
24	Apostasy	Nuclear Messiah
26	Anterior	Echoes of the Fallen
26	Arkona	Slovo
28	Blood Red Throne	Brutalitarian Regime
29	Atomkraft	Cold Sweat (EP)
29	Edguy	Age of the Joker
30	Kittie	I've Failed You
30	Pentagram	When The Screams Come (DVD)
30	Shadowside	Inner Monster Out

=== September ===
Day	Artist	Album
2	Saltatio Mortis	Sturm Aufs Paradies
2	Hank Williams III	Attention Deficit Domination
2	Hank Williams III	Ghost to a Ghost/Gutter Town
2	Hank Williams III	3 Bar Ranch Cattle Callin'
5	Anathema	Falling Deeper (compilation)
6	Saviours	Death's Procession
9	Einherjer	Norrøn
9	Morifade	Empire of Souls
9	Sinner	One Bullet Left
12	Anthrax	Worship Music
13	Anubis Gate	Anubis Gate
13	Alice Cooper	Welcome 2 My Nightmare
13	The Devil Wears Prada	Dead Throne
13	Dream Theater	A Dramatic Turn of Events
13	Haste the Day	Haste the Day Vs. Haste the Day (Live CD/DVD)
13	Pathology	Awaken to the Suffering
13	Primus	Green Naugahyde
13	Staind	Staind
13	Stemm	Crossroads
13	Wolves in the Throne Room	Celestial Lineage
14	Loudness	Eve to Dawn
16	Arckanum	Helvítismyrkr
16	We Came as Romans	Understanding What We've Grown to Be
16	Tasters	Reckless Till the End
19	White Wizzard	Flying Tigers
20	Amebix	Sonic Mass
20	Mournful Congregation	The Unspoken Hymns
20	Opeth	Heritage
21	Hatesphere	The Great Bludgeoning
23	Biohazard	Reborn In Defiance
23	Loch Vostok	Dystopium
23	Textures	Dualism
23	Van Canto	Break the Silence
26	Evile	Five Serpent's Teeth
26	Myrath	Tales of the Sands
26	Nightrage	Insidious
26	Pain of Salvation	Road Salt Two
26	Redemption	This Mortal Coil
26	Axel Rudi Pell	The Ballads IV
27	Sebastian Bach	Kicking & Screaming
27	Brutal Truth	End Time
27	Deivos	Demiurge of the Void
27	Landmine Marathon	Gallows
27	Machine Head	Unto the Locust
27	Mastodon	The Hunter
27	Oh, Sleeper	Children of Fire
27	Rwake	Rest
27	Warbringer	Worlds Torn Asunder
28	Profane Omen	Destroy!
30	Brainstorm	On the Spur of the Moment

=== October ===
Day	Artist	Album
3	Aria	Phoenix
3	The Browning	Burn This World
3	Christ Agony	NocturN
4	Blessthefall	Awakening
5	Galneryus	Phoenix Rising
7	Blotted Science	The Animation of Entomology (EP)
7	Threat Signal	Threat Signal
10	Halford	Halford Live At Saitama Super Arena (DVD)
11	Absu	Abzu
11	Black Cobra	Invernal
11	Charred Walls of the Damned	Cold Winds on Timeless Days
11	Cyco Miko	The Mad Mad Muir Musical Tour
11	Eldritch	Gaia's Legacy
11	Evanescence	Evanescence
11	Five Finger Death Punch	American Capitalist
11	Fuck the Facts	Die Miserable
11	Immolation	Providence (EP)
11	Immortal Souls	IV: The Requiem for the Art of Death
11	Judas Priest	The Chosen Few (compilation)
11	Nile	Worship the Animal (EP)
11	Rise to Remain	City of Vultures
11	Skeletonwitch	Forever Abomination
11	This Is Hell	Black Mass
12	Insomnium	One for Sorrow
14	Almah	Motion
14	Eternal Gray	Your Gods, My Enemies
14	Hypocrisy	Hell Over Sofia – 20 Years Of Chaos And Confusion (DVD)
14	Sólstafir	Svartir Sandar
14	Tsjuder	Legion Helvete
17	Iced Earth	Dystopia
18	Alarum	Natural Causes
18	Electro Quarterstaff	Aykroyd
18	Ronny Munroe	Lords of the Edge
19	Amoral	Beneath
21	Graveworm	Fragments of Death
21	Hammers of Misfortune	17th Street
21	Visions of Atlantis	Maria Magdalena (EP)
24	1349	Hellvetia Fire – The Official 1349 Bootleg (DVD)
24	Carnifex	Until I Feel Nothing
24	Cradle of Filth	Evermore Darkly (EP)
24	Martyr Lucifer	Farewell to Graveland
24	Orphaned Land	The Road To OR-Shalem (DVD)
25	Black Tusk	Set the Dial
25	Carnifex	Until I Feel Nothing
25	Haken	Visions
25	Molotov Solution	Insurrection
25	Necrodeath	Idiosyncrasy
25	Root	Heritage of Satan
26	Riot	Immortal Soul
28	Isole	Born from Shadows
31	Krisiun	The Great Execution
31	Metallica and Lou Reed	Lulu
31	The Rotted	Ad Nauseam
31	Steel Panther	Balls Out
31	Uneven Structure	Februus

=== November ===
Day	Artist	Album
1	Megadeth	TH1RT3EN
1	Metsatöll	Ulg
1	Mike Patton	The Solitude of Prime Numbers
1	Sick of It All	XXV Nonstop
1	Taake	Noregs vaapen
4	Animals as Leaders	Weightless
4	Deathstars	The Greatest Hits on Earth (Compilation)
4	Scorpions	Comeblack
7	Funeral for a Friend	See You All In Hell (EP)
7	Autumn	Cold Comfort
8	A Plea for Purging	The Life & Death of A Plea for Purging
8	As I Lay Dying	Decas (compilation)
8	Disturbed	The Lost Children
8	Leviathan	True Traitor, True Whore
8	My Dying Bride	The Barghest O' Whitby (EP)
8	Whitechapel	Recorrupted (EP)
11	Blut Aus Nord	777 – The Desanctification
11	Esoteric	Paragon of Dissonance
11	Lance King	A Moment in Chiros
11	Nocte Obducta	Verderbnis (Der Schnitter Kratzt An Jeder Tür)
11	Shining	Live Blackjazz (DVD)
11	Sonata Arctica	Live In Finland (DVD)
11	Susperia	We Are the Ones (Compilation)
11	Thy Catafalque	Rengeteg
15	Cynic	Carbon-Based Anatomy (EP)
15	Vile	Metamorphosis
15	Dragonland	Under the Grey Banner
16	Nemesea	The Quiet Resistance
18	Cirith Gorgor	Der Untergang... / Победа !!!
18	Eisregen	Madenreich – Ein Stück Rostrot (EP)
18	Iron Savior	The Landing
18	Mastercastle	Dangerous Diamonds
18	Mortal Sin	Psychology Of Death
18	Oz	Burning Leather
21	Stormzone	Zero To Rage
21	Theocracy	As The World Bleeds
22	In the Midst of Lions	Shadows
22	Vektor	Outer Isolation
25	Andromeda	Manifest Tyranny
25	Cage	Supremacy of Steel
25	Mystic Prophecy	Ravenlord
25	Nucleus Torn	Golden Age
25	Tenhi	Saivo
28	Ulver	Live In Concert: The Norwegian National Opera (DVD)
28	Venom	Fallen Angels
28	Vildhjarta	Måsstaden
29	Royal Hunt	Show Me How to Live
29	Soziedad Alkoholika	Cadenas de Odio
30	Nightwish	Imaginaerum
30	The Unguided	Hell Frost

=== December ===
Day	Artist	Album
1	Postnecrum	Deidad De Sangre (single)
2	Dark Suns	Orange
2	Rammstein	Made in Germany 1995–2011 (compilation)
4	Double Dragon	Sons Of Asena
5	Marionette	Nerve
6	The Empire Shall Fall	Volume 1: Solar Plexus (EP)
6	Korn & Skrillex	The Path of Totality
9	Eisregen	Rostrot
9	Living Sacrifice	In Finite Love (DVD)
13	Metallica	Beyond Magnetic (EP)
14	To/Die/For	Samsara
16	Iron Mask	Black as Death
19	Forefather	Last of the Line
21	Stéphan Forté	The Shadows Compendium
26	Fuck the Facts	10 Fucking Years (compilation)
27	Catalepsy	Westboro

Preceded by 2010	Heavy Metal Timeline; 2011	Succeeded by 2012
