= Slob =

Slob or SLOB may refer to:

- Slob, United States Virgin Islands, a settlement
- Arie Slob (born 1961), Dutch politician
- Jan Janz Slop, or Jan Slob (1643–1727), Dutch Golden Age painter
- S.L.O.B., a 2007 album by Dr. Acula
- "Slob", a 2002 song by Weezer from Maladroit
- Mudflat, or slob, a type of coastal wetland

In computing:

- slob (KDF9), syllabic octal notation as used in conjunction with the English Electric KDF9 computer
- SLOB (Linux), a memory allocation mechanism in Linux Kernel

== See also ==
- Slobodan
