= Thy Catafalque =

Hungarian avant-garde metal band

- Origin: Makó, Hungary
- Genres: Avant-garde metal, experimental rock, post-black metal, progressive metal
- Years active: 1998–present
- Labels: Beverina; Blood; Casus Belli; Epidemie; GS; KaOtic; Kattran; Season of Mist; Soyuz; Symbol of Domination
- Members: Tamás Kátai
- Past members: János Juhász
- Website: thycatafalque.bandcamp.co

Thy Catafalque is an avant-garde metal band formed in Makó, Hungary, with its activities extending to Edinburgh, Scotland, reflecting the movements of its founder.

== History ==
The band was formed by Hungarian musician Tamás Kátai, along with a bandmate from a previous group, Gort. In their early years, the band started off as an "Avantgarde post-black metal project". As time progressed, the band left most of their traditional black metal influences behind for an "extreme variety of songs" in their 2004 album, Tűnő Idő Tárlat. In February 2009, the band was signed to the avant-garde independent record label Epidemie Records. They have had a number of guest musicians over the years, including vocals by Ágnes Tóth of neo-folk duo The Moon and the Nightspirit.

In 2009, they released their concept album Róka Hasa Rádió, about "the relationship between the ever evolving, solid and massive physical matter and the fragileness of humans and all living spirits, throughout distant childhood memories and scientific explanations of nature. Revolving, rotating movements of past and future, colours, sounds, long lost scents by a strange transmission from a timeless radio." It features a mix of atmospheric instrumental music, Hungarian folk elements and traditional black metal, making it very experimental. The album narrowly missed the winner's place in the 2009 HangSúly Hungarian Metal Awards, which was won by Dalriada.

In 2011 the band signed to Season of Mist. Their fifth album entitled Rengeteg released in 2011, was the first Thy Catafalque album written and recorded by Tamás Kátai alone without János Juhász, who did not contribute to the recording this time. Sgùrr was next released in 2015.

In 2020, the band released the Zápor EP via GS Productions on CD and via Casus Belli Musica and Beverina Productions in vinyl. Kátai originally intended the band as a studio-only project, but a number of musicians who were eager to hear Thy Catafalque songs played live reached out to him in 2021 to suggest a live performance with a revolving door of musicians; this eventually took place at the Fekete Zaj festival in Sástó, Hungary; Kátai himself played took part on bass on a few songs. The performance was released as a live album called Mezolit - Live at Fekete Zaj.

=== Tamás Kátai ===
During the 2010s Kátai used to reside in Edinburgh. Beside his musical career, he has also worked as English teacher and as a professional language interpreter for NHS. By the 2020s, he moved back to Hungary.

== Members ==
- Tamás Kátai – vocals, keyboards/synthesizers, guitar, bass guitar, programming

=== Former members ===
- János Juhász – guitar, bass guitar (1998–2011)

=== Mezolit live performance ===
- Attila Bakos - vocals
- Gábor Dudás - vocals
- Lambert Lédeczy - vocals
- Gyula Vasvári - vocals
- Martina Veronika Horváth - vocals
- Ivett Dudás - vocals
- Ádám Forczek - vocals
- András Nagy - vocals
- Bálint Bokodi - vocals
- András Vörös - vocals
- Zoltán Vigh - guitar
- Antal Mór Szűcs - guitar
- Gábor Vári - guitar
- Zoltán Kónya - guitar
- Botond Fogl - guitar
- Dániel Szabó - guitar
- Krisztián Varga - guitar
- Péter Erdélyi - guitar
- Rajmund Katona - bass
- Tamás Kátai - bass, vocals
- György Kantár - bass
- Gergely Cseh - bass
- Michaela Bos - cello
- József Kun - drums
- Árpád Szenti - drums
- Márk Potkovácz - drums
- Tadeusz Rieckmann - drums

== Discography ==
=== Studio albums ===
- Sublunary Tragedies (1999, KaOtic Productions / GS Productions)
- Microcosmos (2001, KaOtic Productions / GS Productions)
- Tűnő Idő Tárlat (2004, Epidemie Records / Blood Music / GS Productions)
- Róka Hasa Rádió (2009, Epidemie Records / Soyuz Music / GS Productions)
- Rengeteg (2011, Season of Mist / Blood Music)
- Sgùrr (2015, Season of Mist)
- Meta (2016, Season of Mist)
- Geometria (2018, Season of Mist)
- Naiv (2020, Season of Mist / Kattran Records / Symbol of Domination Productions)
- Vadak (2021, Season of Mist)
- Alföld (2023, Season of Mist)
- XII: A gyönyörű álmok ezután jönnek (2024, Season of Mist)
- XIII: Sárga erdő (2026, Season of Mist)

=== Compilations ===
- The Early Works (2015, Blood Music)
- Köd Utánam [Boxset] (2020, GS Productions)

=== Live Albums ===
- Mezolit (Live at Fekete Zaj) (2022, Season of Mist)

=== EPs ===
- Zápor (2020, GS Productions / Casus Belli Musica / Beverina Productions)

=== Demos ===
- Cor Cordium (1999)
