= Nation (Dr. Acula album) =

Studio album by Dr. Acula
- Released: June 19, 2012
- Genre: Deathcore
- Length: 31:30
- Label: Victory
- Producer: Jeremy Comitas

Dr. Acula chronology
Slander (2011)	Nation (2012)	Dr. Acula (2022)

Singles from Nation
- 1. "Nation" Released: June 12, 2012; 2. "Ironic Enclosure" Released: June 12, 2012

Professional ratings
Review scores
Source	Rating
Dead Press!	8/10 stars
Punk News	1.5/5 stars

Nation is the fifth studio album by deathcore band Dr. Acula, released on June 19, 2012.

== Track listing ==
No.	Title	Length
1.	"Be Careful What You Wish For..."	0:46
2.	"Heavy Handed"	2:05
3.	"Keep On Running in Place"	2:56
4.	"The Party Is Over (Locked on Target)"	2:23
5.	"Ironic Enclosure"	3:22
6.	"Dressed for Transylvania in the Boiling Weather (Lipstick Guys)"	3:17
7.	"Nation"	2:56
8.	"Robot People from Hell"	1:57
9.	"Suburban Superstar (Strung Out on Strong Island)"	2:47
10.	"Areola 51"	3:28
11.	"Citizen's Arrest"	2:24
12.	"Thinner"	3:09
Total length:		31:30

== Personnel ==
Dr. Acula

- Tyler Guida – vocals
- Casey Carrano – vocals
- Bill Graffeo – guitar
- Ricky Ostolaza – guitar
- Kevin Graffeo – bass
- Jesse Ciappa – drums

Production

- Jeremy Comitas - composer, engineer, mastering, mixing, producer
- Ricky Ostolaza - co-production
- William Control - narrator
- Paul Cutri - mastering
- Doublej - art direction, layout
- Mike C. Hardcore - illustration
