= Dekadens =

EP by Lifelover
- Released: October 9, 2009
- Recorded: May–July 2009 in Strömstad (BBC studios)
- Genres: Black metal, post-punk, industrial rock
- Length: 26:04
- Label: Osmose (OPMCD 231)

Lifelover chronology
Konkurs (2008)	Dekadens (2009)	Sjukdom (2011)

Dekadens (Swedish for "Decadence") is the fourth release by Swedish metal band Lifelover, which was released on 10 October 2009 by Osmose (MCD) and Elitmusik (MLP)

Dekadens is also the band's only release with a human drummer, which is in opposition to the use of drum machines on every other Lifelover release.

== Track listing ==
No.	Title	Music	Lyrics	Length
1.	"Luguber framtid"	B	B	3:06
2.	"Myspys"	B	Non	4:04
3.	"Major Fuck Off"	B	B	2:25
4.	"Lethargy"	B	Non	4:00
5.	"Androider"	( ) & B	B	5:11
6.	"Visdomsord"	( ) & B		2:47
7.	"Destination: Ingenstans"	H. & Non	Non	4:31

== Personnel ==
Lifelover

- Kim Carlsson – lead vocals
- B – vocals, guitar, piano
- H. – guitar
- Fix – bass
- Non – drums

Production

- Lifelover – pictures, layout
- B – mixing
- Gok – mastering
- Henrik Jonsson – band photography
