= Pulver (album) =

Studio album by Lifelover
- Released: July 25, 2006; February 16, 2009 (CD re-issue)
- Recorded: April – May 2006, Stockholm, Sweden
- Genres: Black metal, dark ambient, post-punk
- Length: 42:31
- Labels: GoatowaRex (SDL027); Northern sky productions Osmose Productions(OPCD 213)

Lifelover chronology
Promo (2005)	Pulver (2006)	Erotik (2007)

Pulver (Swedish for "Powder") is the debut album by Swedish depressive black metal band Lifelover, released in 2006. The album art depicts a friend of the band reclining in a field of wood anemones while covered in cow's blood the band bought from a local butcher shop.

== Track listing ==
No.	Title	Music	Lyrics	Length
1.	"Nackskott"	B	LR	3:16
2.	"M/S Salmonella"	B	LR	5:00
3.	"Mitt öppna öga"	B	( )	3:32
4.	"Kärlek – becksvart melankoli"	( ) & B	B	4:44
5.	"Vardagsnytt"	B	B	2:50
6.	"Avbrott sex" (Instrumental)	B		2:07
7.	"Stockholm"	B	B	4:13
8.	"Söndag"	B	B	3:16
9.	"Herrens hand"	B	1853	2:45
10.	"Medicinmannen" (Instrumental)	B		0:43
11.	"Nästa gryning"	( )	( )	6:25
12.	"En sång om dig"	B & ( )	B & 1853	3:40

== Personnel ==
Lifelover

- ( ) – vocals, speech, guitar, lyrics
- B – vocals, bass, piano, drum programming, lyrics
- 1853 – vocals (on "Vardagsnytt" and "Herrens hand"), speech, lyrics
- LR – lyrics

Additional personnel

- Eleanor - model for the album cover
