= Reckless Till the End =

Studio album by Tasters
- Released: September 16, 2011
- Studio: Adrenaline Studio in Livorno, Italy
- Genre: Metalcore; electronicore; deathcore
- Label: Nuclear Blast
- Producer: Daniele Nelli

Tasters chronology
The Rebirth (2009)	Reckless Till the End (2011)

Reckless Till the End is a debut studio album by Italian metalcore band Tasters. It was released on September 16, 2011, via Nuclear Blast.

== Track listing ==
No.	Title	Length
1.	"Katherine's Got a Secret"	4:05
2.	"Please Destroy This World"	3:58
3.	"Thanks for This Precious Gift"	4:24
4.	"Sleeping with Spirits"	4:10
5.	"Dead Roses"	3:15
6.	"Falling Away with a Last Remembrance"	3:27
7.	"How Easy to Die (Smile If You Can)"	3:48
8.	"Shadows"	4:56
9.	"Fight If Your Heart is Broken"	3:50
10.	"Lonely"	2:22
11.	"First Time"	1:51
12.	"(This)Appeared" (Bonus track)	3:06

== Personnel ==
Tasters

- Daniele Nelli – vocals
- Luke Pezzini – guitar
- Tommy Antonini – guitar
- Carlo Cremascoli – bass
- Fabrizio Pagni – keyboards, piano, backing vocals
- Ale "Demonoid" Lera – drums

Production

- Recorded, mastered and mixed by Daniele Nelli and Davide Bitozzi
