= Demolition (Vektor album) =

Demo album by Vektor
- Released: 2005/2006
- Genres: Technical thrash metal, progressive metal
- Length: 48:17
- Label: Self-released

Vektor chronology
Nucleus (2003)	Demolition (2005)	Black Future (2009)

Demolition is the first full-length demo recorded by the thrash metal band Vektor. Although a self-released demo, it is occasionally regarded as the band's first full-length album, due to its 48-minute length. "Spiral Galaxy" is the intro of "Oblivion" separated into its own track. "Infiltration" and "Moonbase" are the only tracks that were never re-recorded for their later albums.

It was rated 84 out of 100 by MetalReviews.com.

== Track listing ==
No.	Title	Length
1.	"Spiral Galaxy (instrumental)"	1:13
2.	"Oblivion"	4:35
3.	"Fast-Paced Society"	6:56
4.	"Venus Project"	7:31
5.	"Destroying the Cosmos"	7:15
6.	"Infiltration (instrumental)"	0:56
7.	"Moonbase"	12:55
8.	"Tetrastructural Minds"	6:56
Total length:		48:17

== Credits ==
- David Disanto - guitar, vocals
- Erik Nelson - guitars
- Mike Tozzi - bass guitar
- Adam Anderson - drums
