= Terminal Redux =

Studio album by Vektor
- Released: May 6, 2016
- Recorded: 2015–2016
- Studio: Panther Pro Audio, Villain Recordings
- Genre: Technical thrash metal; progressive death metal
- Length: 73:21
- Label: Earache
- Producer: Vektor, Byron Filson

Vektor chronology
| Outer Isolation (2011) | Terminal Redux (2016) |

Terminal Redux is the third album by the American thrash metal band Vektor, released on May 6, 2016. It is the band's first album released on Earache Records. The album is a concept album, which tells a sci-fi story about a high ranking individual, banished into space, who finds the key to immortality. From this discovery, they then spread their influence far and wide, gaining near-complete control over the entire population of Earth. Afterwards, they explore the Milky Way, eventually experiencing an existential crisis as a result. Vocalist, guitarist and songwriter David DiSanto has also stated that the album was intended to serve as a concept album about the band itself. Terminal Redux is the final Vektor album to feature Frank Chin and Blake Anderson, as both left the band in December 2016. It was also Vektor's final album before they entered a four-year-hiatus that same year.

== Production and release ==
Vektor first played the song "Ultimate Artificer" live in August 2014, after roughly a year of writing new material. The band spent much of 2015 in the studio, recording the album. In November of that year, the band announced that their upcoming album would be entitled Terminal Redux, and released a studio version of "Ultimate Artificer". In February 2016, the band revealed the album's final release date, artwork, and track listing.

== Reception ==
Professional ratings
Review scores
| Source | Rating |
|---|---|
| AllMusic | 4/5 stars |
| Metal Hammer | 4/5 stars |
| MetalSucks | 4.5/5 stars |
| Pitchfork | 8.2/10 |
| Spin | 9/10 |
| Sputnikmusic | link |

Terminal Redux received positive reviews from professional critics. Dom Lawson of Metal Hammer magazine placed the album 8th in his list of the top 10 metal albums of 2016. Stereogum list the album 20th on their list of the best 40 metal albums of 2016.

== Track listing ==
| No. | Title | Length |
|---|---|---|
| 1. | "Charging the Void" | 9:11 |
| 2. | "Cygnus Terminal" | 8:15 |
| 3. | "LCD (Liquid Crystal Disease)" | 7:33 |
| 4. | "Mountains Above the Sun" | 1:22 |
| 5. | "Ultimate Artificer" | 5:04 |
| 6. | "Pteropticon" | 6:00 |
| 7. | "Psychotropia" | 7:39 |
| 8. | "Pillars of Sand" | 5:19 |
| 9. | "Collapse" | 9:22 |
| 10. | "Recharging the Void" | 13:36 |
| Total length: | | 73:21 |

== Personnel ==
=== Vektor ===
- David DiSanto – guitar, vocals
- Erik Nelson – guitar
- Frank Chin – bass guitar
- Blake Anderson – drums

=== Additional personnel ===
- Byron Filson – production, mixing, mastering
- Daniel Kishbaugh – recording
- Adam Burke – artwork
- RoseMary Fiki – backing vocals on "Charging the Void" and "Recharging the Void"
- Naeemah Z. Maddox – backing vocals on "Charging the Void" and "Recharging the Void"
- Alex Poole – soundscapes
