= Human Museum =

Studio album by Icon in Me
- Released: May 2, 2009
- Genre: Alternative metal, melodic death metal
- Length: 46:42
- Label: Massacre Records, Irond Media
- Producer: Jacob Hansen

Icon in Me chronology
Human Museum (2009)	Head Break Solution (2011)

Human Museum is the debut studio album by Russian metal band Icon in Me.

== Track listing ==
1. Dislocated (5:09)
2. That Day, That Sorrow (3:25)
3. End Of File (4:15)
4. Empty Hands (6:02)
5. Moments (4:14)
6. Blood Ritual (2:31)
7. To The End (4:55)
8. In Memorium (1:13)
9. The Worthless King (4:54)
10. Turn The Dead On (4:40)
11. Avoiding The Pain (5:24)

=== Bonus tracks ===
1. Torn Black Sky (3:58)
2. Fierce By God (4:22)
