= Black Future =

Studio album by Vektor
- Released: November 17, 2009
- Recorded: 2009
- Studios: Villain Recordings, Phoenix, Arizona
- Genres: Technical thrash metal, progressive metal
- Length: 68:03
- Label: Heavy Artillery
- Producer: Byron Filson

Vektor chronology
Demolition (2006)	Black Future (2009)	Outer Isolation (2011)

Vektor – Black Future
Review scores
Source	Rating
Allmusic	link
Blabbermouth	link
Rock Hard	link

Black Future is the first full-length album recorded by technical thrash metal band Vektor, released in 2009 on Heavy Artillery records with a special edition double vinyl LP release in 2010. Earache Records reissued the album in 2013.

== Track listing ==
No.	Title	Length
1.	"Black Future"	5:03
2.	"Oblivion"	4:54
3.	"Destroying the Cosmos"	6:47
4.	"Forests of Legend"	10:16
5.	"Hunger for Violence"	5:30
6.	"Deoxyribonucleic Acid"	4:45
7.	"Asteroid"	6:49
8.	"Dark Nebula"	10:28
9.	"Accelerating Universe"	13:31
Total length:		68:03

== Personnel ==
All information taken from CD booklet liner notes.

=== Vektor ===
- David DiSanto – guitar, vocals
- Erik Nelson – guitar
- Frank Chin – bass guitar
- Blake Anderson – drums

=== Production ===
- Byron Filson – recorded, engineered, mixed, and mastered
- Kian Ahmad – cover artwork
- Valerie Littlejohn – live and promotional pictures
