= The Raven and the Reaping =

Studio album by The Famine
- Released: May 27, 2008
- Genres: Death metal, metalcore
- Label: Solid State
- Producers: Kris McCaddon, Andreas Lars Magnusson

The Famine chronology
| The Famine (2007) | The Raven and the Reaping (2008) | The Architects of Guilt (2011) |

Professional ratings
Review scores
| Source | Rating |
|---|---|
| Jesus Freak Hideout | 3.5/5 stars |
| Indie Vision Music | 7/10 |

The Raven and the Reaping is the first album by the death metal band The Famine. It was released on May 27, 2008 on Solid State Records. The song "Killing for Sport" was written in 10 minutes before being recorded.

== Track listing ==
| No. | Title | Length |
|---|---|---|
| 1. | "Scar the Earth" | 3:01 |
| 2. | "Behemoth" | 2:41 |
| 3. | "Consume Devour Repeat" | 3:13 |
| 4. | "The South Will Rise" | 3:41 |
| 5. | "Death Threat" | 2:52 |
| 6. | "Killing for Sport" | 0:53 |
| 7. | "Cut from the Stone" | 3:29 |
| 8. | "Ascend" | 3:24 |
| 9. | "Another Foot to the Shovel" | 3:47 |
| 10. | "Unending Silence" | 2:57 |
| 11. | "Stitched in Plastic" | 2:32 |

== Credits ==
- Kris McCaddon - vocals, producer
- Mark Garza - drums
- Andrew Godwin - guitar
- Nick Nowell - bass

Production

- Andreas Lars Magnusson - producer, engineering, mixing, mastering
- Ryan Clark (musician) - illustrated
- Jon Dunn - A&R
