= Kim Carlson =

Kim Carlson, Kim Carlsson or Kim Karlsson may refer to:

- Kim Carlson, Miss Iowa Teen USA
- Kim Carlsson, of Swedish dansband Arvingarna
- Kim Carlsson, of Swedish black metal band Lifelover, also known as "( )"
- Kim Karlsson, ice hockey player
