= Kryoburn =

American industrial metal band

- Origin: Carlsbad, New Mexico, U.S.
- Genres: Industrial metal
- Years active: 1995 – around 2010
- Labels: Candlelight
- Members: Todd Brashear; Les Huber; Chris Huber; Allen Scott; Sam Logan
- Past members: Jared Pace; Hunter Correll

Kryoburn was an American industrial metal band.

== History ==
Formed in 1995, Kryoburn began to amass a following in the local Carlsbad metal scene that over time allowed them to grow to the national level. They toured the United States continually from 2000, gaining an ever-increasing fanbase along the way. They have garnered critical acclaim from heavy metal publication Metal Maniac's December 2005 edition. Kryoburn released their debut album, Enigmatic Existence, on Candlelight Records in 2005. In May 2009, the band revamped their Myspace site with material from their upcoming album, Three Years Eclipsed. After a change in lineup and other setbacks, joining the band was Allen Scott on guitar/vocals and Sam Logan on synthesizer and keyboards. Three Years Eclipsed was released on Candlelight Records USA on January 11, after which Kryoburn disbanded shortly afterward.

== Members ==
- Todd Brashear – vocals, guitars
- Les Huber – vocals, bass
- Chris Huber – drums, samples
- Allen Scott – vocals, guitars
- Sam Logan – synthesizer, keyboards
- Jared Pace – bass
- Hunter Correll – bass, backing vocals
- Kelly Bogues – synthesizer, keyboards

== Discography ==
- 2005: Enigmatic Existence
- 2011: Three Years Eclipsed
