= S.L.O.B. =

Studio album by Dr. Acula
- Released: May 29, 2007
- Recorded: 2007
- Genre: Deathcore
- Length: 22:14
- Label: 187

Dr. Acula chronology
Chillogy (2006)	S.L.O.B. (2007)	Below Me (2008)

S.L.O.B. (an acronym for Silver-Lipped Operator of Bullshit) is the debut full-length album by American deathcore band Dr. Acula. It was released on May 29, 2007 through 187 Records.

== Track listing ==
No.	Title	Length
1.	"Party"	1:15
2.	"The Cuckoo Clock of Doom"	2:06
3.	"Night of the Living Dummy"	1:34
4.	"Lets Get Invisible"	2:03
5.	"Monster Blood"	2:03
6.	"How I Got My Shrunken Head"	2:41
7.	"Piano Lessons Can Be Murder"	1:55
8.	"Shocker On Shock Street"	1:53
9.	"Say Cheese and Die"	2:53
10.	"Legend of the Lost Legend"	4:12
Total length:		22:14

- Tracks 3, 5, 7, and 9 are re-recorded songs from the Chillogy EP.
- All song titles (excluding track 1) are again taken from book titles in the Goosebumps series.

== Personnel ==
- Rob Accardi – vocals
- Bert Vegas – vocals, keyboard
- Bill Graffeo – guitar
- Lou Figurito – guitar, bass
- Rob "Acula" Guarino – bass, guitar
- Mike Cosentino – drums
- Petey Poison – samples
