= Dr. Acula (band) =

Deathcore band from Long Island, NY

- Origin: Long Island, New York, US
- Genres: Deathcore, mathcore, metalcore
- Years active: 2005–2012; 2015; 2019–present
- Labels: Victory, Uprising, Shock Street, 187
- Members: Lou Figurito; Rob Guarino; Omar Montufar; Danny Kopij

Dr. Acula is an American deathcore band from Long Island, New York. Formed in 2005, the group has released six studio albums and one EP. They were signed to Victory Records at the time of their initial disbandment and are currently signed to Silent Pendulum Records. The band is known for the use of soundclips from movies and TV shows as an accent to their songs. Their band name is derived from an alternative perspective from the name of Dracula, which was originally part of a joke coined by comedian Mitch Hedberg. After disbanding in 2012, the original line up reunited in late 2019 and released their 6th album, Dr. Acula in September 2022.

== History ==
Dr. Acula was founded in 2005 by Bill Graffeo, Bert Vegas, Rob Accardi, Mike Cosentino, Lou Figurito, and Rob Guarino. Their name was originally inspired by a quote from comedian Mitch Hedberg; "I went to see the doctor. All he did was suck blood from my neck. Don't go see Doctor Acula." In the beginning the band did not take the music seriously by writing joke songs, lampooning current trends and stereotypical bands in the Long Island scene. Soon after they began to pioneer songs from their experiments and released an EP, titled Chillogy, independently the following year.

The band released their first demo in 2006 with Chillogy before following up with their debut studio full length in 2007 with S.L.O.B. (Silver-Lipped Operator of Bullshit) released on the now defunct 187 Records. After several DIY tours throughout 2006 and 2007, the band gained the attention of Uprising Records, and signed to the label the following year. The band had a few lineup changes with drummer Mike Cosentino being replaced by William Conway and vocalists Rob Accardi and Bert Bolsen being replaced by Tyler Guida (ex - My Bitter End). With the new line up, the band released their second full length, Below Me in 2008. Uprising Records compiled the bands Chillogy Demo alongside their 2007 demo and S.L.O.B into a compilation record titled Slobology which saw release the following year. In the proceeding years the band saw themselves touring and performing at many local and national festivals.

After yet again re-aligning their line-up, Dr. Acula released their third studio album, The Social Event of the Century in 2010, also through Uprising Records. It was met with better reception than Below Me, although didn't reach as wide of an audience as Uprising failed to promote the record as aggressively as Below Me. In October 2009, founding members Rob Guarino and Lou Figurito as well as Eric Wallwork left the band effectively leaving one original member in Bill Graffeo who would go on to be with the band until their breakup and subsequent reunion. Graffeo's brother Kevin Graffeo replaced Guarino on bass, Adam Stiletto replaced Figurito and Drew Gripe replaced Wallwork.

After the release of The Social Event of the Century, Dr. Acula signed with Victory Records. The band released their debut on the label and fourth overall, Slander on February 15, 2011. On June 20 of that year, keyboardist, Joey Simpson quit the band while on The Horror Nights Tour. On June 19, 2012, Dr. Acula released Nation, their final album for Victory Records and their last album before their initial disbandment and eventual reunion with the original lineup in 2019.

On August 27, 2015, it was announced a one-off 10-year reunion show, commemorating the formation of the original band, would be taking place on October 3, 2015, in Long Island, NY. It featured an original line-up, including Bill Graffeo, Bert Vegas, Rob Accardi, Mike Cosentino, Lou Figurito, and Rob Guarino.

On September 13, 2019, the original line up announced they are back together and would play another reunion show in support of The World We Knew at Amityville Music Hall in Long Island, NY. The band played two more shows on December 6 and December 7 at the Amityville Music Hall. On the same day as their first show of 2019, the band released a demo of a new song titled "Egg Monsters From Mars".

In September 2021 during a show at Amityville Music Hall, the band announced that they have announced that they have parted ways with vocalist Bert Vegas with guitarist Lou Figurito handling all sampling duties and Rob Accardi handling all vocal duties. At the same show they announced that they have recorded a new album at Westfall Studios that would see release in 2022. The band parted ways with drummer Mike Cosentino in early 2022, being replaced by Jay Dino.

On July 1, 2022, the band announced their signing with Silent Pendulum Records and a release date of September 28, 2022 for Dr. Acula- their first album in 10 years and 15 years with the original lineup. The band also announced a summer tour with P.S. You're Dead and Curses.

In December 2024, the band announced Rob Accardi and Bill Graffeo departed the band and were replaced by Omar Montufar of Downsides, and Danny Kopij of Bore respectively. The band debuted the new lineup at No Sleep Fest in Houston, Texas on December 7, 2024.

== Band members ==
Current lineup

- Lou "Dawg" Figurito – rhythm guitar (2007–2009, 2015, 2019–present), bass (2005–2007)
- Rob "Acula" Guarino – bass (2007–2009, 2015, 2019–present), rhythm guitar (2005–2007)
- Omar Montufar – lead vocals (2024–present)
- Danny Kopij – lead guitar (2024–present)

Previous members

- Bill Graffeo – lead guitar (2005–2012, 2015, 2019–2024)
- Rob Accardi – lead vocals (2005–2007, 2015, 2019–2024)
- Mike "DADA" Cosentino – drums (2005–2007, 2015, 2019–2022)
- Bert "Vegas" Bolson – vocals, keyboard (2005–2007, 2015, 2019–2021), lead vocals (2007–2008)
- Craig Hecht – samples (2005–2006)
- Peter Stolarski – samples (2006–2007), lead vocals (2007), vocals, keyboard (2008–2009)
- Jon-Erik "Jerik" Pantorno – bass (2007), vocals, keyboard (2007–2008), lead vocals (2008)
- William Conway – drums (2007–2008)
- Eric Wallwork – drums (2008–2009)
- Tyler Guida – lead vocals (2008–2012)
- Drew Gipe – drums (2009–2010)
- Joey Simpson – samples (2009–2011)
- Casey Carrano – lead vocals (2009–2012)
- Kevin Graffeo – bass (2009–2012)
- Adam Stiletto – rhythm guitar (2009–2010)
- William Gipe – rhythm guitar (2010)
- Jesse Ciappa – drums (2010–2012)
- Ricky Ostolaza – rhythm guitar (2010–2012)
- Keenan Harrison – vocals (2013)
- Chris Brea – lead vocals (2012)
- Oliver Kult – bass (2012)
- Jay Dino - drums (2022-2026)

== Discography ==
Albums

- S.L.O.B. (2007, 187 Records)
- Below Me! (2008, Uprising)
- The Social Event of The Century (2010, Uprising)
- Slander (2011, Victory)
- Nation (2012, Victory)
- Dr. Acula (2022, Silent Pendulum Records)

Singles

- "Egg Monsters From Mars" (2019, self-released)

Demos

- Chillogy (2006, self-released)
- Demo 2007 (2007, self-released)

Compilation albums

- Slobology (2009, Uprising)

== Videography ==
- "Is This a Party, or a Dick-Measuring Contest?" (2010)
- "Who You Gonna Call!?" (2011)
- "Welcome to Camp Nightmare" (2011)
- "Party 2.0" (2012)
- "Ironic Enclosure" (2012)
- "Citizen's Arrest" (2012)
- "How To Kill A Monster" (2022)
