= Your Gods, My Enemies =

Studio album by Eternal Gray
- Released: December 31, 2010
- Recorded: March 2007 at Studio Underground, Västerås, Sweden
- Genre: Technical death metal, progressive metal
- Length: 37:45
- Label: Season of Mist
- Producer: Pelle Seather

Eternal Gray chronology
Kindless (2002)	Your Gods, My Enemies (2010)

Professional ratings
Review scores
Source	Rating
Terrorizer	4/5 stars

Your Gods, My Enemies is the second album by Israeli technical death metal band Eternal Gray, self-released on December 31, 2010, exactly 8 years after their first album.

After long delays, the album was self-released by the band in Israel as small capacity special limited edition USB disk on key that features the songs, as well as bonus material such as demos, lyrics and photo galleries.

Work on the album dates back to 2004, when the band entered the studio to work on the album for the first time with the same line-up as the first album. These sessions didn't last long after founding member, singer and guitarist Eyal Glottman departed the band, taking with him all the written material for the album. The album was recorded with a new line-up in March 2007 at Studio Underground in Västerås, Sweden. The only member on this album that was present from the original three man line-up is guitarist Dory Bar-Or.

In May 2009, mastering for the album was finished by Göran Finnberg (Opeth, Soilwork) and the band announced that the album was ready for release, though it was delayed again until late 2010.

On July 20, 2011, Season of Mist announced that the album will be officially released through the label on October 14, 2011 in Europe and October 18, 2011 in North America, in a normal CD format as opposed to the previously released disk on key format available only in Israel.

== Track listing ==
No.	Title	Length
1.	"Lost Control"	3:41
2.	"Controlled"	3:31
3.	"Black Prophecy"	4:02
4.	"Desolate the Weak"	4:15
5.	"Inner Anger"	3:26
6.	"Your Gods, My Enemies"	5:30
7.	"Unlabeled"	4:29
8.	"Blind Messiah"	5:27
9.	"Never Waits"	3:21

Limited Edition Digipak bonus track
No.	Title	Length
10.	"Never Waits" (Electronic version)

== Personnel ==
Eternal Gray

- Oren Balbus - lead vocals
- Dory Bar-Or - guitars, keyboards
- Auria Sapir - guitars
- Gil Ben-Ya'akov - bass
- Dror Goldstein - drums, percussion

== Release history ==
Country	Release date
Israel	December 31, 2010
Europe	October 14, 2011
United States	October 18, 2011
