= Dawn of Retribution =

- Origin: Geelong, Australia
- Genre: Melodic Death Metal
- Years active: 2007–2012
- Label: Independent
- Members: Bennett Dunstan; Chris McEwin; Ben Jackson; Michael Vandenberg; Clint Williams
- Past members: Dani Jeffers; Mathew Dawson
- Website: dawnofretribution.com

Dawn of Retribution is an Australian heavy metal band from Geelong. The band was formed in 2007. Since the band's inception, they have released one demo CD, Blood Drunk and one full studio album The Plan to End Humanity.

== Discography ==
- Blood Drunk [Demo] (2007)

No.	Title	Music	Length
1.	"Blood Drunk"	Dunstan / Dawson / Vandenberg / Williams	4:23
2.	"Second To None"	Dunstan / Dawson / Vandenberg / Williams	4:40
3.	"The Forked Tongue"	Dunstan / Vandenberg / Williams	3:55

The Plan to End Humanity (2010) is Dawn of Retribution's first full-length studio album.

No.	Title	Music	Length
1.	"Ascension of the Shadow"	Dunstan / McEwin / Vandenberg / Williams	5:14
2.	"Day Zero"	Dunstan / McEwin / Vandenberg / Williams	4:49
3.	"Minutes of the Millennia"	Dunstan / McEwin / Vandenberg / Williams	3:52
4.	"The Wake of Devastation"	Dunstan / McEwin / Vandenberg / Williams	6:02
5.	"Against The World"	Dunstan / Vandenberg / Williams	5:03
6.	"Merciless"	Dunstan / McEwin / Vandenberg / Williams	4:56
7.	"The Plagues That Followed"	McEwin / Vandenberg / Williams	5:47
8.	"Alive and Screaming"	Dunstan / McEwin / Vandenberg / Williams	6:45
