= Outer Isolation =

Studio album by Vektor
- Released: November 22, 2011
- Recorded: 2011
- Studio: Villain Recordings, Phoenix, Arizona
- Genre: Technical thrash metal, progressive metal
- Length: 51:41
- Label: Heavy Artillery
- Producer: Vektor, Byron Filson

Vektor chronology
| Black Future (2009) | Outer Isolation (2011) | Terminal Redux (2016) |

Earache Records re-release cover

Professional ratings
Review scores
| Source | Rating |
|---|---|
| Metal Storm | Vektor – Outer Isolation |
| Rock Hard | link |

Outer Isolation is the second full-length album recorded by the band Vektor. It was released in 2011 on Heavy Artillery Records, and Earache Records reissued the album in 2012. The final tracks of the album, "Fast Paced Society" and the title track, feature radio emissions of Saturn detected by Cassini.

== Track listing ==
| No. | Title | Length |
|---|---|---|
| 1. | "Cosmic Cortex" | 10:22 |
| 2. | "Echoless Chamber" | 5:16 |
| 3. | "Dying World" | 5:18 |
| 4. | "Tetrastructural Minds" | 5:21 |
| 5. | "Venus Project" | 6:47 |
| 6. | "Dark Creations, Dead Creators" | 3:25 |
| 7. | "Fast Paced Society" | 6:45 |
| 8. | "Outer Isolation" | 8:27 |
| Total length: | | 51:41 |

== Personnel ==
- David DiSanto – guitar, vocals
- Erik Nelson – guitar
- Frank Chin – bass guitar
- Blake Anderson – drums
