= The Architects of Guilt =

Studio album by The Famine
- Released: February 15, 2011
- Genre: Melodic death metal
- Length: 40:19
- Label: Solid State Records
- Producer: D. Braxton Henry

The Famine chronology
The Raven and the Reaping (2008)	The Architects of Guilt (2011)

Professional ratings
Review scores
Source	Rating
Metalholic	(8.9/10)
Heavy Blog Is Heavy	3.5/5 stars

The Architects of Guilt is the second full-length album by the death metal band The Famine released the February 15, 2011 via Solid State Records. It is the follow-up to their debut The Raven and the Reaping (2008).

== Development ==
=== Early stages ===
After the departure of vocalist Kris McCaddon on January 9, 2010, bassist Nick Nowell took over vocals, and bass duties were quickly filled by new addition Jon Richardson as announced on the 15th. On February 26, the band announced that their studio burned down with all of their materials for their new album. Bassist Jon Richardson explains: "The Architects of Guilt is not a sing-a-long or a feel good record; it’s the death rattle and dying breath.The Famine is not here to win popularity contests, simply create metal, red in tooth and claw." and “The music has become faster, more technical, even abrasive and discomforting, trading sheer aggression and energy for the lifeless sweeps and mechanized beats that have come to dominate and dilute the genre. The lyrics forego empty threats and skip the subtleties, calling out the deceit and duplicity of our leaders, and the decay next door masked by a flaking white picket fence and a familiar chemical scent.” The album cover and the track list were revealed on 23 December 2010. The Famine have made 6 behind the scenes footage from the making of the album, the first was the 23rd December 2010 while the last one was posted the 14th February 2011.

=== Production ===
The Architects of Guilt was produced by D. Braxton Henry (Ex- Devourment) and mixed by Jason Suecof (Mutiny Within, The Black Dahlia Murder, Trivium, Charred Walls of the Damned).

=== Album cover ===
Vocalist Nick Nowell explains about the album cover saying: "I talked to Ryan Clark about the lyrical theme being very uncomfortable and discussing human nature without delving into metal clichés like satan and gore. Ryan is a guy who knows metal and who knows the art world, so he was the perfect guy for this job. He came back with a concept that is not blasphemous, but is uneven and uncomfortable. You look at it and you want to look away, but you aren’t exactly sure why. If I wanted to take it this far, I could say that the image on the cover represents the hideous architect of guilt within each of us. It’s ugly and it’s crystal clear.".

== Promotion and release ==
A number of tracks were released to promote the album: "Ad Mortem", "VII The Fraudulent", "A Fragile Peace", "The Crown and the Holy See"; and the music video for the first single "Ad Mortem" was released the 9th February.

== Track list ==
Lyrics: Nick Nowell, except “We are the Wolves” by Andrew Forbus, music: The Famine

No.	Title	Length
1.	"The New Hell"	3:33
2.	"Ad Mortem"	3:23
3.	"We are the Wolves"	4:06
4.	"Turner Classic Diaries"	3:25
5.	"Bigger Cages, Longer Chains!"	3:56
6.	"The Crown and The Holy See"	3:03
7.	"VII The Fraudulent"	3:04
8.	"A Pavement of Good Intentions"	4:11
9.	"A Fragile Peace"	3:44
10.	"Pyrithion House"	3:25
11.	"To the Teeth"	4:29
Total length:		40:19

== Personnel ==
- Nick Nowell – vocals
- Andrew Godwin – guitar
- Mark Garza – drums
- Jonny "Christmas" Richardson – bass
- D. Braxton Henry – production
- Ryan Clark – artwork
- Jason Suecof – mixing
