= Mindflow =

MindFlow
- Origin: Brazil
- Genre: Progressive metal
- Years active: 2003–Present
- Label: Unlock Your Mind Productions
- Members: Danilo Herbert; Rafael Pensado; Ricardo Winandy; Rodrigo Hidalgo

Mindflow was a progressive metal band from Brazil. The band was founded in 2003, and they released their first album, Just the Two of Us... Me and Them, the following year. This album turned out to become a success; the record company's bestseller for more than two years. Their second album, Mind Over Body, was released in 2006. The band's third album Destructive Device, was released in 2008. They released their fourth and final album 365 in January 2011.

== Biography ==
In 2006, a new project, "Mind Over Body" was released and conceived as a "Flow of Consciousness".

Since 2004, MindFlow have completed two European tours, one in Asia, and another in North America. They have made appearances at many festivals such as the 2nd Duryu Rock and Sports Festival in South Korea. In Spain, the group appeared at the Prog Metal Fest, a multi-venue festival that visited four cities: Madrid, Palencia, Barcelona and Girona. Still on the European scene, MindFlow played at the Metal Heart Festival in Norway, at the Cambridge Rock Festival in England and performed at a show in Belgium, Spirit of 66. In the United States alone, they have performed in 10 more shows, including the Monsters of Rock; the Texas Mad Festival; and the Blastzone Festival. In Brazil, the group has appeared all over the country, at such events as the Live'N'Louder Rock Fest 2006, at the Skol Area, Anhembi, São Paulo - Latin America's biggest rock festival - and have already played in the stages of some Brazilian venues such as the Directv Music Hall (now the Citibank Music Hall), the Via Funchal and the Victoria Hall.

Their third album Destructive Device was produced by Ben Grosse (Marilyn Mason, Slipknot, Disturbed, Breaking Benjamin, Sevendust) and was recorded and mixed both in Brazil and Los Angeles. Grosse recorded parts of the album (specifically the bass, drums and keyboards) at "Mosh Studios" in São Paulo, and moved the project to "The Mix Room" in Los Angeles where the vocals, guitar and mixing were completed. Frankie James, a music manager from the United States brought them into management and toured them with the legendary rock group U.F.O. The tour was successful enough to bring them back again for a second U.S. tour. Frankie James parted ways with Mindflow soon after.

Mindflow has recently announced a new album, titled 365.

== GAME Follow Your Instinct ==
"Follow Your Instinct" is an Alternate Reality Game created by the band MindFlow. The game situates the participants as detectives in pursuit of a dangerous serial killer.

ARG is a type of game that combines fictional situations with reality, making use of media channels from the real world. "Follow Your Instinct" takes place in websites, e-mails, phone calls, and among other media sources.

More than 3,000 people participated in the first edition of "Follow Your Instinct" that lasted 1 year and 3 months. The clues were all over the place from musical passages, emails, websites, mysterious recordings, photos and especially in a comic booklet that came with the disc of the band.

In its album Destructive Device MindFlow's saga continues with: FOLLOW YOUR INSTINCT 2.0 – J.A.C.K. The new website of the band has become an Intelligence Agency and the disc is now the portfolio of evidence of new crimes of the serial killer including a poster for the start of the investigation.

== Band members ==
- Danilo Herbert – lead vocals
- Rafael Pensado – drums, backing vocals
- Ricardo Winandy – bass
- Rodrigo Hidalgo – guitars, backing vocals

== Discography ==
=== Albums ===
- Just the Two of Us... Me and Them (2004)
- Mind Over Body (2006)
- Destructive Device (2008)
- 365 (2009)
- With Bare Hands (2011)
