= Catalepsy (band) =

American deathcore band

- Genres: Deathcore
- Years active: 2004–2012, 2014–present
- Labels: Eulogy Stillborn
- Members: Rob Walden; Ben Sutton; Drew Carothers
- Website: myspace.com/catalepsy,

Catalepsy is an American deathcore band formed in 2004. They have released one EP, Godless, and three studio albums, Iniquity, Bleed and Abomination of Desolation.

== History ==
Catalepsy was founded in 2004 as a thrash/metalcore three-piece. From August 2006 the band's sound moved towards deathcore. They entered the studio in September and recorded two demo songs. In 2008, the band finished a tour with Hatebreed for their Live Dominance DVD release. They completed their first studio album, Iniquity, in January 2008. The album was released on May 13, 2008. In early 2008, the band recorded a music video for their song "Trust". It premiered on MTV's Headbangers Ball. In late 2008, Drew Carothers left the band and was replaced by Josh Anderson of the Florida band Iamdivide. The band continued to tour with bands including After the Burial, Oceano, Too Pure to Die, Waking the Cadaver and Rose Funeral.

In October 2010, during the recording of Bleed, Josh Anderson left the band. He was replaced by Rick Norman, formerly of In The Ruins, also a past member of Catalepsy. On December 3, 2010, the band released the first single from Bleed called "Infernal". On February 26, 2011, the band announced a music video for the track "Bleed" due in the album release of May 10, 2011. Bleed was released on May 10, 2011 through Eulogy Recordings.

In late 2011, vocalist Rick Norman left the band and Josh Anderson returned in his place. On December 28, 2011, the band released a song titled "Westboro" that thematised the Westboro Baptist Church.

Catalepsy disbanded in 2013 but re-formed in September 2014 shortly. Catalepsy were writing new material in 2021 for an upcoming single, featuring all original members from the beginning of the band’s formation.

== Members ==
Current lineup

- Ben Sutton – drums (2007–2008, 2010–2012, 2014–present)
- Rob Walden - guitar (2004-2013, 2021–present)
- Andrew Carothers – vocals (2007–2008, 2010, 2014–present)

Past lineup

- Pat Chumley– bass
- Jeff Sanchez – bass
- Craig O'Reilly III – bass
- Timothy Smith – bass
- Justin Grimes – drums
- Charles Nikolet – drums
- Rob Walden – guitar (2004–2012)
- Mat Selovers – guitar (2004–2005)
- Benjamin Tucker – vocals (2004–2005)
- Nancy Michelle – vocals (2005–2006)
- Danny Schwartz – bass (2006–2011)
- Mike Cromwell – guitar (2006–2007)
- John Stephan – guitar (2007–2008)
- Rob Conover – vocals (2008–2009)
- Josh Anderson – vocals (2008–2010, 2011–2012)
- Matt Sutton — guitar (2008–2011)
- Bert Conover – vocals (2009)
- Mike Burns – drums (2010)
- Brandon Honeycutt - bass (2010)
- Rick Norman – vocals (2010–2011)
- Sean Murphy – bass (2011–2012)
- Matt Browning – guitar (2011–2012)

== Discography ==
Albums

- Iniquity (2008)
- Bleed (2011)
- Abomination of Desolation (2012)

EPs

- Godless (2007)
- Hallowed Be Thy Grave (2005)
- Decapitation of Eros (2005)

== Videography ==
- "Trust" (2008)
- "Bleed" (2011)
