= Elexorien =

Dutch power/Viking metal band

- Origin: Groningen, Netherlands
- Genres: Power metal Viking metal
- Years active: 2004–2011
- Label: Trollzorn
- Past members: Joris; Iné; Lainedil; Wolve; Liza; Grimbert; Merlijn; Lotte

Elexorien was a power/viking metal band from Groningen, Netherlands.

== Musical characteristics ==
Elexorien played a mixture of power and viking metal with growls and classically trained female vocals, also taking influences from folk, black and death metal. The term "Epic Battle metal" is how the band defined their own sound.

== Band history ==
=== Formation and debut album (2004–2008) ===
Founded in 2004 by Lainedil (guitarist, growls), Grimbert (keyboard), Liza (bass) and Joris (drums), they first went under the name Tearful Dawn. They then changed their name to Elexorien, which is taken from one of Kit Rae's fantasy blades from the Swords of the Ancients.

In 2005 they were joined by vocalist Iné and guitarist Wolve. With these additions they finished up their line-up and went to play concerts in Netherlands, supporting bands like Ensiferum, Suffocation and Korpiklaani. In May 2005, they recorded and released their promo Rising of the Storm, which was then followed by their full-length self-titled debut album, released on April 13, 2007.

=== For Those Who Remain, planned second album, and break-up (2008–2011) ===
At the start of the year the band announced they would part ways with drummer Joris. Joris left to focus on different musical styles. He stayed with the band for several gigs after that so they would have enough time to find a replacement. In July they found that replacement in Merlijn Poolman.

In November 2008, the band announced they would enter the studio again to record an EP called For Those Who Remain. This EP included an unreleased track that would also be featured on their upcoming album. On December 21, 2008 the Hard as Iron DVD was released by their label Trollzorn.

In January the band announced they added their newly recorded song "For Those Who Remain" to their Myspace page, and that they had an upcoming tour scheduled for late 2009 in South America together with God Dethroned.

In September 2009, Iné stepped down as vocalist of Elexorien.

On February 8, 2010, Elexorien announced they had found a new singer.

On May 20, 2011 it was announced on their official site that Elexorien had split up.

== Band members ==
Final line-up

- Liza "Aphrodite" Hoek - bass (2004-2011)
- Bert "Grimbert den Heerscher" de Ruiter - keyboards (2004-2011)
- Lainedil - harsh vocals, guitars (2004-2011)
- Ronald "Wolve" Lukken - guitars (2005-2011)
- Merlijn Poolman - drums (2008-2011)
- Lotte - vocals (2010-2011)

Previous members

- Joris Nijenhuis - drums (2004-2008)
- Iné "The Crusher" Zijlstra - vocals (2005-2009)

Timeline

== Discography ==
Albums

- Elexorien (2007)

Promo

- Rising of the Storm (2005)
