= The Famine =

American death metal band

- Origin: Arlington, Texas, U.S.
- Genres: Death metal
- Years active: 2006–2011
- Labels: Solid State
- Past members: Andrew Godwin; Mark Garza; Nick Nowell; Jon Richardson; Kris McCaddon; Brad Fincher; Jon Tooley

The Famine was an American death metal band formed in Arlington, Texas, in 2006. They were signed to Solid State Records.

== History ==
=== Formation and three-song EP ===
The band initially formed with three of the original members of Embodyment in former lead vocalist Kris McCaddon, drummer Mark Garza and guitarist Andrew Godwin. While McCaddon previously played guitar in Demon Hunter he, along with Nick Nowell, also played guitar in Society's Finest. During the fall of 2006 the band recorded 3 songs that would later become a self-released EP.

=== The Raven and the Reaping ===
The Famine's first album The Raven and the Reaping was recorded in November and December 2006 with Andreas Magnusson (The Black Dahlia Murder, The Agony Scene) and released in May 2008. The Famine performed on the Stronger Than Hell tour with Demon Hunter and Living Sacrifice in the summer of 2008. They toured with Rose Funeral and The World We Knew during October 2008 and with The Devil Wears Prada, Saosin, and Underoath in November 2008. During this time they were also picked up for management by Anthony "Yogi" Allgood of Outerloop management (Emery, Darkest Hour) based out of the Washington, DC area.

The Famine's video for the song "Consume, Devour, Repeat" premiered virally on MTV's Headbangers Blog on Thursday, November 6 and was subsequently televised on MTV2's Headbangers Ball on Saturday, November 8.

=== The Architects of Guilt and departure of Kris McCaddon ===
The band announced the departure of vocalist Kris McCaddon via MySpace on January 9, 2010. Bassist Nick Nowell took over vocals, and bass duties were quickly filled by new addition Jon Richardson as announced on the 15th.

The band's studio burned down in February 2010. It contained all of their equipment and tracking for their new album. Only one song from these sessions, "We Are The Wolves", made it on to the new album. Solid State rented out a house for The Famine to record in. The band stated that if the label had not done this it would have taken a much longer time for the album to be recorded. "The Architects of Guilt" was released February 15, 2011, through Solid State Records. A video for the song "Ad Mortem" was released soon after the album was released.

=== Disbanding ===
On April 12, 2011, Nick Nowell announced via a Facebook post that The Famine had disbanded. The announcement read as follows:

"The Famine never should have existed. I don't mean that like when a jealous brother screams 'I wish you were never born!' at his little sister. What I mean is that we came together as a group of married thirty-somethings with kids and small businesses. Our singer lived on the other side of the country. It was a cumbersome proposition, but we made it work. Most of you are familiar with the fire that claimed most of our equipment and the departure of our vocalist about a year ago. We should have never been able to make our last record, but we did. This brings us to the present day.

As of this past Saturday, The Famine is no more. In my mind, bands break up because Courtney Love kills their singer or because they can't stand each other. Neither of those circumstances is descriptive of our situation. For us, life simply got in the way, as it often does. Mark and Andy both have families for which they are the breadwinners, and Jon has been putting off going to graduate school. Instead of trying to simultaneously satiate Mark's drive and Andy's inability to tour and my distance from the band and Jon's webbed toes (sorry, Jon), we came together and decided as a group that it is time to lay The Famine to rest.

Words cannot express how thankful we all are to have had these experiences, and without those of you who are reading this right now, none of this would have been possible. So, from the bottom of my heart, I want to thank all of you for the support and kindness you have shown us for the past four years. Thank you for allowing us in to your lives, and for giving us the opportunity to connect, even though most of us have never met. You'll see us around. You might not see the same faces or the same names, but I know that music means too much to all of us to let it die with this moniker. So, this is goodbye for now.

-Love,

Nick"

—

Before disbanding, The Famine recorded a cover of Pantera's "Domination" off of the album, Cowboys from Hell, without Godwin, with Tooley taking over.

The Famine performed their last concert on August 12, 2011, at Tomcats West in Fort Worth, Texas. Andrew Godwin, Nick Nowell, and Jon Richardson were the only active members from "The Architects of Guilt" performing at the show. Touring Guitarist Jon Tooley, which they had made a member and fill-in drummer Brad Fincher (Devourment) were also there to perform the show.

== Christianity ==
Despite being on the predominantly Christian Solid State label, as well as sharing members with the openly Christian band Embodyment, The Famine expressed much reluctance to be associated with the Christian market throughout their tenure. In 2008, McCaddon told Indie Vision Music, when asked about the relation of the band's faith to their music, "You can call us whatever you want. We are a metal band and wouldn't label ourselves anything but and honestly don't care what people label us. Our faith isn't forced into our music, nor is it an obligation. It is embedded in the fabric and is who we are."

In his review of The Architects of Guilt, Scott Alisoglu of Blabbermouth.net directly identified the band as "[playing] Christian death metal" on the album, and made several further references to the band's faith throughout the review. Nowell took issue with this in a March 2011 note on the band's official Facebook page, in which he stated that "The Famine is not, and has never been a Christian band. Furthermore, I am an Atheist...The Famine isn't a religious institution, in theory or in practice. We are a death metal band, plain and simple." Despite this, as of May 2012, Alisoglu has yet to recant the categorization.

The Christian music site Jesus Freak Hideout reviewed both of the band's albums, though staff member Michael Weaver noted that The Architects of Guilt had not been released to the Christian market, and that the site was covering it because "they are a Solid State band that expresses their faith in their music."

== Members ==
Final lineup

- Brad Fincher – drums (2011) (Devourment)
- Andrew Godwin – guitar (2006–2011) (Embodyment, Chase Pagan, Pyrithion, Hope Deferred)
- Nick Nowell – bass (2008–2010), lead vocals (2010–2011) (Society's Finest, The Monarch, Thorn vs. Side, Sunrise Cemetery, Angels Giant Angels)
- Jonny "Christmas" Richardson – bass (2010–2011) (Saboteur, The Monarch)
- Jon Tooley – guitar (2010–2011) (Bear Witness, 1733, Hope Deferred)

Former members

- Kris McCaddon – lead vocals (2006–2010) (Embodyment, Demon Hunter, Society's Finest)
- Mark Garza – drums (2006–2011) (Embodyment, Lhoist, formerly of Bleeding Through, Constant Seas)

Timeline

== Discography ==
- The Famine (Independent, 2007)
- The Raven and the Reaping (Solid State, 2008)
- The Architects of Guilt (Solid State, 2011)

== Videos ==
- "Consume, Devour, Repeat" – 2008
- "Ad Mortem" – 2011
- "Domination" (Pantera cover) – 2011
