= Sjukdom =

Studio album by Lifelover
- Released: February 14, 2011
- Recorded: April – October 2010 (Resignation Sounds)
- Genres: Black metal, progressive rock, post-punk, death metal
- Length: 56:10
- Label: Prophecy Productions (PRO113)

Lifelover chronology
Dekadens (2009)	Sjukdom (2011)

Sjukdom (Swedish for "Sickness") is the fourth and final album by Swedish metal band Lifelover. It was written almost entirely by band member Jonas "B" Bergqvist, who also played all instruments on it (as well as contributed occasional vocals), and it was released on 14 February 2011 by Prophecy Productions. A limited-edition vinyl and CD boxset was also released. The album is noted for its more ‘gritty’ sound compared to other Lifelover records–a couple songs notably feature an apparent groovy death metal influence, which was a style never previously explored by the band.

Seven months after Sjukdom was released (September 2011), Bergqvist would be found dead from an accidental prescription overdose. Lifelover would then break up as a direct result of his death.

== Track listing ==
No.	Title	Music	Lyrics	Length
1.	"Svart galla"	B	LR	4:28
2.	"Led by Misfortune"	B	LR	3:07
3.	"Expandera"	B	( )	3:49
4.	"Homicidal Tendencies"	B	LR	1:44
5.	"Resignation"	B	B	3:37
6.	"Doften av tomhet"	B	( )	5:03
7.	"Totus anctus"	B	B	3:51
8.	"Horans hora"	B	1853	6:19
9.	"Bitterljuv kakofoni"	Gok	Gok	4:14
10.	"Becksvart frustration"	B	1853	4:28
11.	"Nedvaknande"	B	1853	2:51
12.	"Instrumental Asylum" (instrumental)	B		4:52
13.	"Utdrag"	( ) & B		3:17
14.	"Karma"	B	LR	4:30

== Personnel ==
Lifelover

- ( ) – lead vocals, lyrics
- B – guitars, bass, drum machine, piano, vocals, lyrics
- LR – vocals (on track 13 & 14), lyrics
- 1853 – lyrics

Other personnel

- P.G. (Reaktor 4) – vocals (on track 3)
- Gok – music, lyrics (on track 9)
