= Lifelover =

Swedish metal band

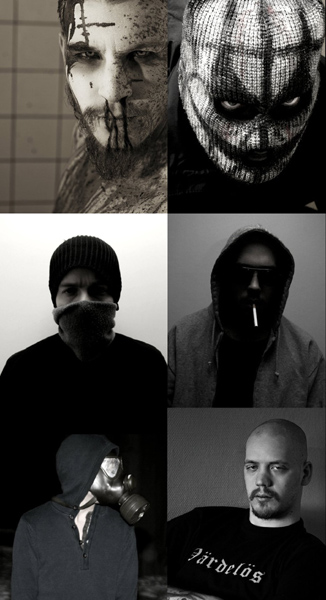
- Clockwise from top right: Jonas "B" Bergqvist, Felix "Fix" Öhlén, Rickard "LR" Öström, Johan "1853" Gabrielson, Henrik "H." Huldtgren and Kim "( )" Carlsson

Background information
- Origin: Stockholm, Sweden
- Genres: Black metal, post-punk, dark ambient
- Years active: 2005–2011; 2015, 2025 (two performance reunions)
- Label: Prophecy
- Past members: Jonas Bergqvist; Kim Carlsson; Henrik Huldtgren; Felix Öhlén; Fredrik Kral; Johan Gabrielson; Rickard Öström; Joel Malmén

Lifelover was a Swedish band formed in 2005 by Jonas Bergqvist and Kim Carlsson in Stockholm. Following six years of activity the group split up in September 2011 after the death of Bergqvist, as he was the lead composer and one of Lifelover's founding members. While widely considered being metal, Lifelover combined several genres into their sound, citing black metal, post-punk, dark ambient, doom metal and gothic rock among other influences. The band called their music "narcotic metal", which was described in a Decibel interview with Carlsson where he stated "anyone should be able to figure that out [what that means] or make their own conclusion about it."

With Lifelover's depressive lyrics, musicianship and atmosphere, the band are credited for being one of the biggest influences on the black metal subgenre depressive suicidal black metal (also known as DSBM).

== History ==
=== Formation and first releases (2005–2006) ===
Lifelover was formed in June 2005 in Stockholm, Sweden by the two individuals Jonas "B" Bergqvist and Kim "( )" Carlsson. A demo called Promo 2005 was recorded the same month, but was never officially released and consisted of Carlsson and B playing guitars provided with ambient sounds across two very long tracks (the first track being 28:46 long and the second track being 24:59 long) both totaling up to 53 minutes and 45 seconds of recording length, the band described these two tracks as "improvised misery".

The next April, the band began to record the material that would come to be the album Pulver , along with a major shift in musical direction compared to the Promo 2005 demo. The backing vocalists/lyricists LR and 1853 were recruited to the band at this time, and the album was finished in May 2006. The album was later released by Goatowarex Records in July 2006.

=== Erotik, Konkurs and Sjukdom (2007–2011) ===
The band's second album Erotik, was released by Total Holocaust Records on 24 February 2007; guitarist H. had joined the band by this time. In late 2007, Lifelover signed a contract with Avantgarde Music and recruited two new members, Fix on bass and S. on drums for upcoming live shows. LR left the band in April 2008. Lifelover played their first live show in Stockholm in September 2008 and their third album, Konkurs, was released by Avantgarde the following month.

Osmose Productions re-issued both Pulver and Erotik on CD in 2009, Erotik was re-issued on 21 January 2009 and Pulver on 7 May. Member 1853 and live drummer S. both left the band in May 2009. Lifelover released a mini-album, Dekadens, in July 2009 (on Osmose Productions), the first (and only) Lifelover release with real drums which is in contrast to the drum programming the band would use on all their other albums. The drumming was provided by the band's then newest member Non. In February 2011 their fourth full-length album, Sjukdom, was released by Prophecy Productions. Drummer Non had left the band by this point, while LR and 1853 returned to contribute to the album.

=== The death of B and final performances (2011–2015) ===
On 10 September 2011, it was confirmed that band member B died the previous day. An official statement released on 16 September stated that he had died in his sleep after overdosing the night before on his prescription drug medication. It was proven to be an accidental death after an investigation following had suicide and foul play ruled out, and an official autopsy report released months later indicated "poisoning and overdose" as the cause of death. The remaining members ultimately decided to split up, citing B's irreplaceable role as songwriter and lead composer, and stated that their final shows were those performed in Belgium and the Netherlands the weekend following B's death. After these concerts, the band had planned on playing one more show on 14 October 2011 dedicated to B, but later decided against it, laying the band to rest out of respect to him. Despite this, Lifelover did perform one more live show in November 2015 for the band's 10th anniversary since they formed in 2005. The concert took place in Quebec, Canada, which was the first time ever that Lifelover performed a show outside of Europe.

== Band name ==
The name for Lifelover came from when Jonas "B" Bergqvist was called a "life lover" by a man whom he loathed. He named the band Lifelover with the idea in mind that people can "call us anything [they] want." Former drummer Joel "Non" Malmén added onto this by saying "we're all life lovers in our own sense; our own personal sense."

== Members ==
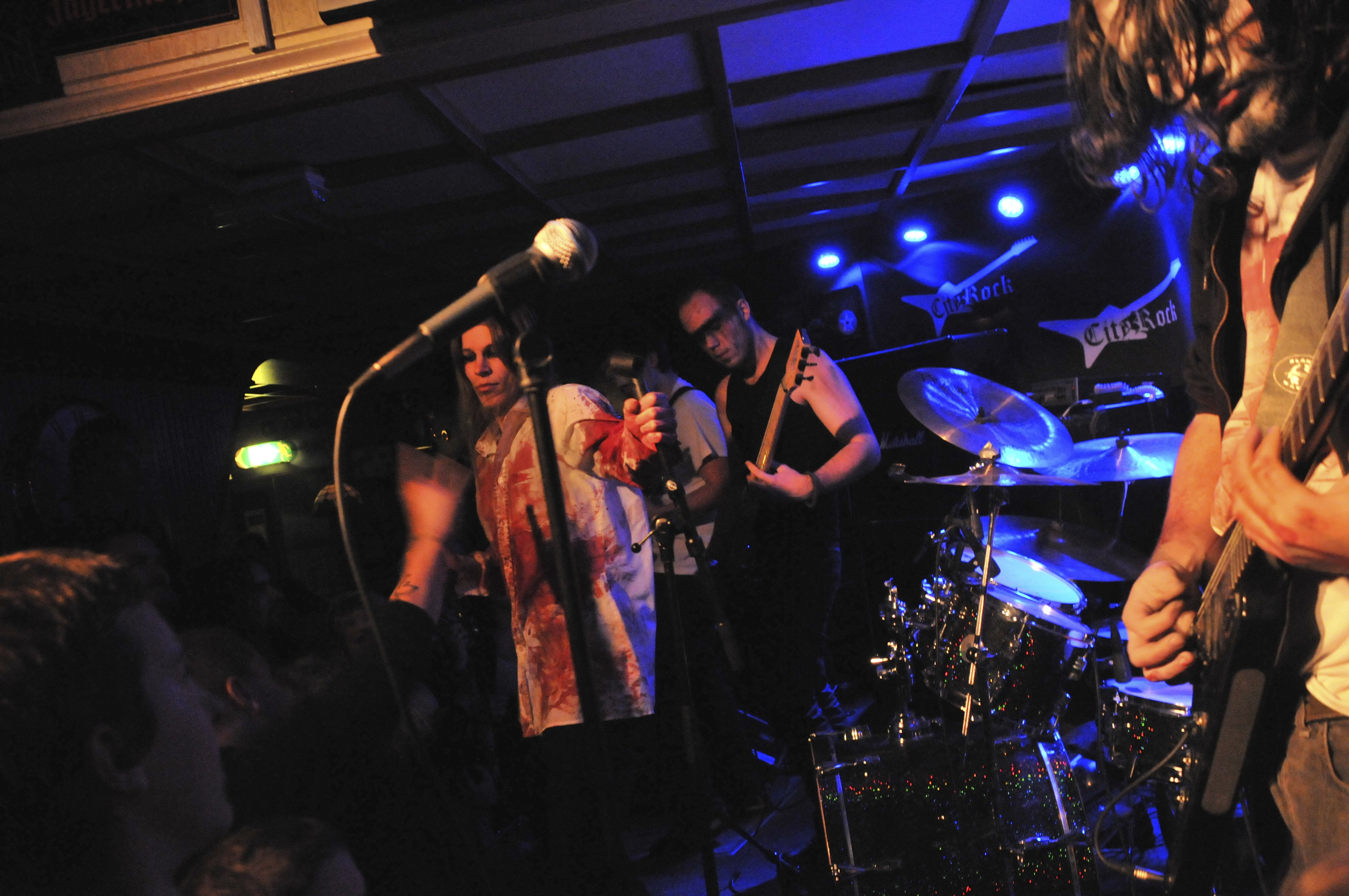
Lifelover performing live in Stockholm, 2008

Final lineup

- Jonas "B" Bergqvist (deceased) – vocals, guitars, bass, piano, lyrics (2005–2011)
- Kim "( )" Carlsson – lead vocals, guitar, lyrics (2005–2011)
- Henrik "H." Huldtgren – guitar (2006–2011)
- Felix "Fix" Öhlén – bass guitar (2007–2011)
- Johan "1853" Gabrielson – additional vocals, lyrics (2005–2009, 2011)
- Rickard "LR" Öström – additional vocals, lyrics (2006–2008, 2011)
- Fredrik Kral – drums (2011)

Previous members

- Joel "Non" Malmén – drums, lyrics (2009–2010)

== Discography ==
Studio albums

- Pulver (2006)
- Erotik (2007)
- Konkurs (2008)
- Sjukdom (2011)

EPs

- Dekadens (2009)

Demos

- Promo 2005 (2005)
