= Eternal Gray =

Israeli technical death metal band

- Origin: Tel Aviv, Israel
- Genres: Technical death metal, progressive metal
- Years active: 2001–2012, 2015
- Labels: Season of Mist, Listenable, Raven Music
- Past members: Zion Mizrachi; Auria Sapir; Dory Bar-Or; Eyal Ben Shushan; Eyal Glotman; Oren Balbus; Gil Ben-Ya'akov; Eran Asias; Dror Goldstein; Roy Chen
- Website: www.eternalgray.net

Eternal Gray was a technical death metal band originating from Tel Aviv, Israel. The band was known as one of the most respected bands in the Israeli heavy metal scene, and has gathered very positive feedback abroad. On December 22, 2012, after 11 years of activity, band leader Dory Bar-Or announced that he has decided to put the band to an end.

== History ==
=== Formation and Kindless (2001–2003) ===
The band was formed in late 2001 by Eyal Glottman (guitars, vocals), Dory Bar-Or (guitars, bass, keyboards) and Eran Asias (drums, percussion), describing themselves as a "dark death metal" band.

In 2002, the band flew to Sweden to record their debut album. The album was recorded at Abyss Studios with producer Tommy Tägtgren, with guest vocals by Peter Tägtgren (of Hypocrisy and Bloodbath) and Marcel Schirmer (of Destruction).

The album, entitled Kindless was released through Raven Music and Listenable Records in August 2002 to positive reviews from such famed magazines as Metal Hammer and Rock Hard. Following the release of the album, the band performed a series of headlining shows around Israel, as well as opening for such international acts as Destruction, Megadeth, Dismember, Behemoth, Rotting Christ and more. In 2003, bassist Gil Ben-Ya'akov of Breorn joined the band to fill in the bass position which had been vacant since the band's formation.

=== Line-up changes, Deeds of Hate and Numb EPs and hiatus (2004–2007) ===
In 2004, the band entered the studio once again to work on new material for their second studio album - Your Gods, My Enemies, though not long after, singer, guitarist and founding member Eyal Glottman left the band, taking with him all of the material he has written for the album. Not long after, drummer Eran Asias also left the band. Drummer Roy Chen of Breorn was recruited to complete the recording of the material.

In 2005, the band recorded an EP entitled Deeds of Hate which was planned for release in only 1000 copies, before the band decided not to release it. It was the only release to be recorded with the second line-up as it didn't last long after that. Later in 2005, the band was joined by singer Oren Balbus, Matricide guitarist Auria Sapir and Abed drummer Dror Goldstein. With that line-up, the band recorded a cover of At the Gates' song "Blinded by Fear" for an At the Gates tribute album. Following more line-up changes, the band recorded another EP, entitled Numb, which was also left unreleased. It was later revealed that Deeds of Hate and Numb were the same EP which was recorded twice, but the band was not satisfied with the material and the recording both times.

The band performed its last show in 2006, before deciding to cease work on the new album and go on a hiatus, following line-up changes that got in the way of the album's recording. Following the hiatus, guitarist and founding member Dory Bar-Or moved to Germany to concentrate on his musical career, while writing new material for the album and returning to Israel once in a few months to share the new material with the other band members and rehearse. Eventually, by 2007, the band had finished writing all the material for the album and decided to record it.

=== Your Gods, My Enemies, line-up changes and break-up (2007–2012) ===
In March 2007, the band flew again to Sweden to record their second album, Your Gods, My Enemies, from the beginning. This time, they recorded the album with producer Pelle Seather at the Studio Underground.

In May 2009, mastering for the album was finished by Göran Finnberg, who previously worked with Opeth and Soilwork, and the band announced that the album was finished and that they were getting ready for a special release show for the album in the following months. They also announced that they were keeping the first working title for the album from 2004, Your Gods, My Enemies, as the album's official title.

On January 7, 2010, the band had its comeback show, the band's first show in 3 years. The band debuted new material from the upcoming album and announced that the album would be released in a special release show in a few months.

On December 31, 2010, the band's long-awaited second studio album Your Gods, My Enemies was finally released in a small capacity on a special limited edition USB disk on key, featuring the 9 new songs from the album, with additional bonus material such as demos, lyrics, photo galleries and more exclusive content. The band has announced plans to release the album on CD in Israel and worldwide in 2011, as well as a supporting European tour in late 2011.

On March 24, 2011, the band performed as a supporting act to Meshuggah on their only show in Israel at the Barby Club in Tel Aviv.

On May 17, 2011, it was announced that Eternal Gray had signed with the French extreme metal label Season of Mist to release their latest album Your Gods, My Enemies worldwide, in a CD format, in the fall of 2011. The album was previously released only in Israel in a limited edition disk on key format.

On July 20, 2011, Season of Mist announced that the band's second album Your Gods, My Enemies will be officially released through the label on October 14, 2011 in Europe and October 18, 2011 in North America, in a normal CD format as opposed to the previously released disk on key format available only in Israel.

On August 26, 2011, the band was set to perform, along with other Israeli bands Phantom Pain and Spawn of Evil, as a supporting act to Vader on their only Israeli show at the Sublime club in Tel Aviv. On July 28, 2011, it was announced that the concert would be postponed to an unknown date following logistical problems and poor ticket sales.

On September 20, 2011, the song "Lost Control" was released for free listening and download from Season of Mist's official website. On the same day, the label also released a video teaser for the upcoming album.

On June 28, 2012, it was announced that the band had gone through several line-up changes, with lead vocalist Oren Balbus and bassist Gil Ben-Ya'akov leaving the band. Replacing them would be Zion Mizrachi (Whorecore, ex-Tales from the Morgue) on lead vocals, and Eyal Ben Shushan (The Fading, Beef, ex-Ferium) on bass.

On December 22, 2012, after 11 years of activity, band leader Dory Bar-Or announced on the band's Facebook page that he has decided to put the band to an end after saying that keeping the band in the vision he had was in the last years exhausting, as well as emotionally draining.

=== Reunion (2015) ===
On November 24, 2014, it was announced that Eternal Gray would perform as the backing band to Nevermore singer Warrel Dane on his first solo show in Tel Aviv, Israel, performing songs from his solo career, as well as Nevermore songs, though the band won't play any original songs from their own material. The show took place at the Tmuna Theater in Tel Aviv, on February 5, 2015.

On January 27, 2015, it was announced that Eternal Gray would be reuniting for a one-off reunion show, supporting Cannibal Corpse on their show in Tel Aviv on April 8, 2015, as well as celebrating 13 years to their debut album Kindless. The band is set to play their debut album entirely. It will be the band's first live show playing original material, since their Kindless 10th anniversary show on August 13, 2012. The band played the reunion with the Your Gods, My Enemies line-up, excluding bassist Gil Ben-Ya'akov, who did not take part in the reunion, and was replaced by Matricide bassist Shahar Guy.

== Band members ==
=== Final line-up ===
- Oren Balbus – lead vocals (2005–2012, 2015)
- Dory Bar-Or – guitar, keyboards (2001–2012, 2015), bass (2001–2003)
- Auria Sapir – guitar (2005–2012, 2015)
- Shahar Guy – bass (2015)
- Dror Goldstein – drums, percussion (2006–2012, 2015)

=== Former members ===
- Zion Mizrachi - lead vocals (2012)
- Eyal Ben Shushan – bass (2012)
- Gil Ben-Ya'akov – bass (2003–2012)
- Eyal Glottman – lead vocals, guitar (2001–2004)
- Eran Asias – drums, percussion (2001–2004)
- Roy Chen – drums, percussion (2004–2005)

== Discography ==
Albums

- 2002 - Kindless
- 2011 - Your Gods, My Enemies
