= Slander (album) =

Studio album by Dr. Acula
- Released: February 15, 2011
- Genre: Deathcore
- Length: 38:40
- Label: Victory
- Producer: Jeremy Comitas

Dr. Acula chronology
The Social Event of the Century (2010)	Slander (2011)	Nation (2012)

Professional ratings
Review scores
Source	Rating
Kill Your Stereo	Mixed

Slander is the fourth studio album by deathcore band Dr. Acula, released on February 15, 2011.

== Background ==
On January 7, 2011, the first single online "Cocaine Avalanche" was released for streaming. On January 13, 2011, Victory Records released an album trailer on YouTube which displayed the album's official artwork. On February 9, 2011, a music video was made and released for the song "Who You Gonna Call!?". On January 24, 2012, Dr. Acula premiered their new music video for “Party 2.0” online. "Party 2.0" samples Pee-wee Herman's voice and laughter, and "Welcome to Camp Nightmare" contains a soundclip from the film Friday the 13th Part VI: Jason Lives.

== Track listing ==
No.	Title	Length
1.	"Clinger (Stage 5)"	0:46
2.	"Fire Crotch (The Venereal Van Ride)"	2:39
3.	"Welcome to Camp Nightmare"	3:52
4.	"Currently Sexting..."	2:44
5.	"Cocaine Avalanche"	3:17
6.	"Song Before the Song"	3:45
7.	"Pure and Immature (Goon)"	2:54
8.	"Who You Gonna Call!?"	3:41
9.	"All Work. No Play"	2:59
10.	"Slander"	3:48
11.	"Slampig (...and Then the Bitch)"	2:46
12.	"Party 2.0"	2:50
13.	"The Big Sleep"	2:48
Total length:		38:40

== Personnel ==
Dr. Acula

- Tyler Guida – vocals
- Casey Carrano – vocals
- Joey Simpson – samples, keyboards
- Bill Graffeo – guitar
- Ricky Ostolaza – guitar
- Kevin Graffeo – bass
- Jesse Ciappa – drums

Production

- Jeremy Comitas - vocals editing, producer, engineer, mixing, mastering
- Sierra Shardae - vocals editing
- Matt Corrado - illustrations
- Doublej Art Direction - design
- Jayson DeZuzio - editing, mastering, mixing assistant
