= Nocte Obducta =

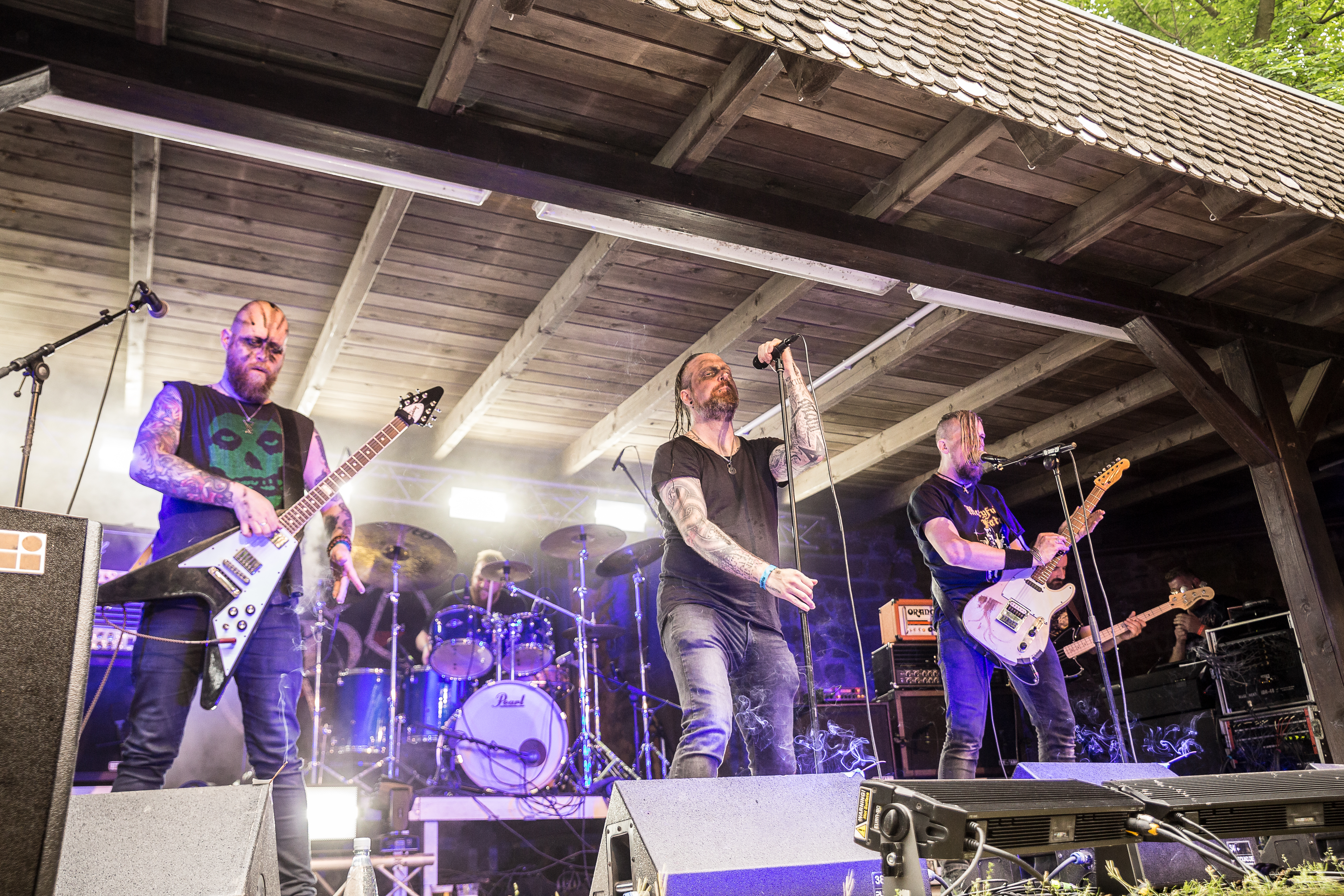
- Nocte Obducta performing at Dark Troll Open Air 2022, Germany

Background information
- Also known as: Desîhra
- Origin: Mainz, Germany
- Genres: Black metal, avant-garde metal
- Years active: 1993–present
- Labels: Supreme Chaos Records, Grind Syndicate Media
- Website: www.nocte-obducta.de

Nocte Obducta is a German avant-garde black metal band.

They were founded in 1993 in Mainz under the name Desîhra. The band released twelve albums, the first four of them under Grind Syndicate Media, all albums from 2003 were published under Supreme Chaos Records.

== Discography ==
- Doch lächeln die blutleeren Lippen / Begräbnisvermählung (1998) (demo)
- Lethe – Gottverreckte Finsternis (1999)
- Taverne – In Schatten schäbiger Spelunken (2000)
- Schwarzmetall – Ein primitives Zwischenspiel (2001)
- Galgendämmerung – Von Nebel, Blut und Totgeburten (2002)
- Stille – Das nagende Schweigen (2003)
- Nektar – Teil I: Zwölf Monde, eine Hand voll Träume (2004)
- Nektar – Teil II: Seen, Flüsse, Tagebücher (2005)
- Aschefrühling (2006) (single)
- Sequenzen einer Wanderung (2008)
- Verderbnis – Der Schnitter kratzt an jeder Tür (2011)
- Umbriel (Das Schweigen zwischen den Sternen) (2013)
- Mogontiacum (Nachdem die Nacht herabgesunken...) (2016)
- Totholz (Ein Raunen aus dem Klammwald) (2017)
- Irrlicht (Es schlägt dem Mond ein kaltes Herz) (2020)
- Karwoche (Die sonne der toten pulsiert) (2023)
