= Vektor (band) =

American thrash metal band

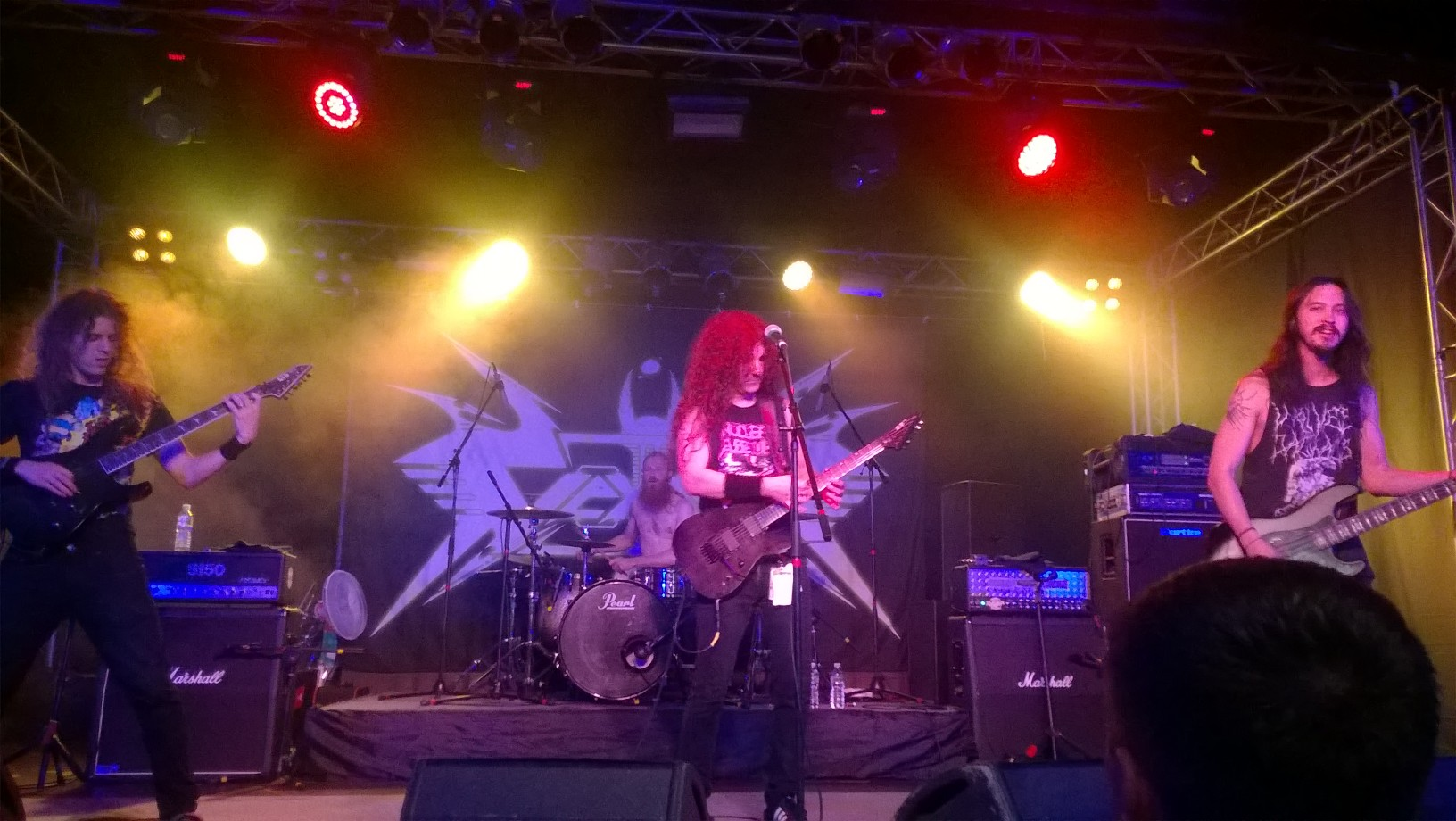
- Vektor in 2016

Background information
- Also known as: Locrian (2002–2004)
- Origin: Tempe, Arizona, U.S.
- Genres: Technical thrash metal, progressive metal
- Years active: 2002–2016, 2020–present
- Label: Earache
- Members: David DiSanto; Erik Nelson; Stephen Coon; Mike Ohlson
- Past members: Adam Anderson; Kian Ahmad; Mike Tozzi; Frank Chin; Blake Anderson

Vektor is an American technical thrash metal band from Tempe, Arizona, and based in Philadelphia since 2012. Their music deals with scientific, philosophical, futuristic, and astronomical topics.

In 2025, Zahra Huselid of Screen Rant included the band in the site's list of "10 Best Thrash Metal Bands Who Weren't The Big Four".

== History ==
=== Formation and first albums (2002–2011) ===
The band was formed as Locrian in December 2002 by frontman/guitarist David DiSanto. A year later, they released their first demo, Nucleus. After reforming in 2004 as Vektor, they became popular in the Phoenix metal scene with a mix of technical thrash metal and speed metal with progressive influences. In 2006, Vektor released the demo Demolition, followed by the two-track demo Hunger for Violence (2007). After four years of local and regional performances opening for Testament, Hirax, Iced Earth and Municipal Waste, Vektor toured alongside label mates Exmortus to support Black Future in December 2009 through January 2010. The band toured the US in June–August 2010 on their own. Their first full-length album, Black Future, was released on November 17, 2009, on Heavy Artillery Records. The band released its second album, Outer Isolation, on November 22, 2011, on the Heavy Artillery label. In 2012, the band signed with Earache Records after the label acquired Heavy Artillery's roster.

=== Touring, Terminal Redux, and hiatus (2012–2016) ===
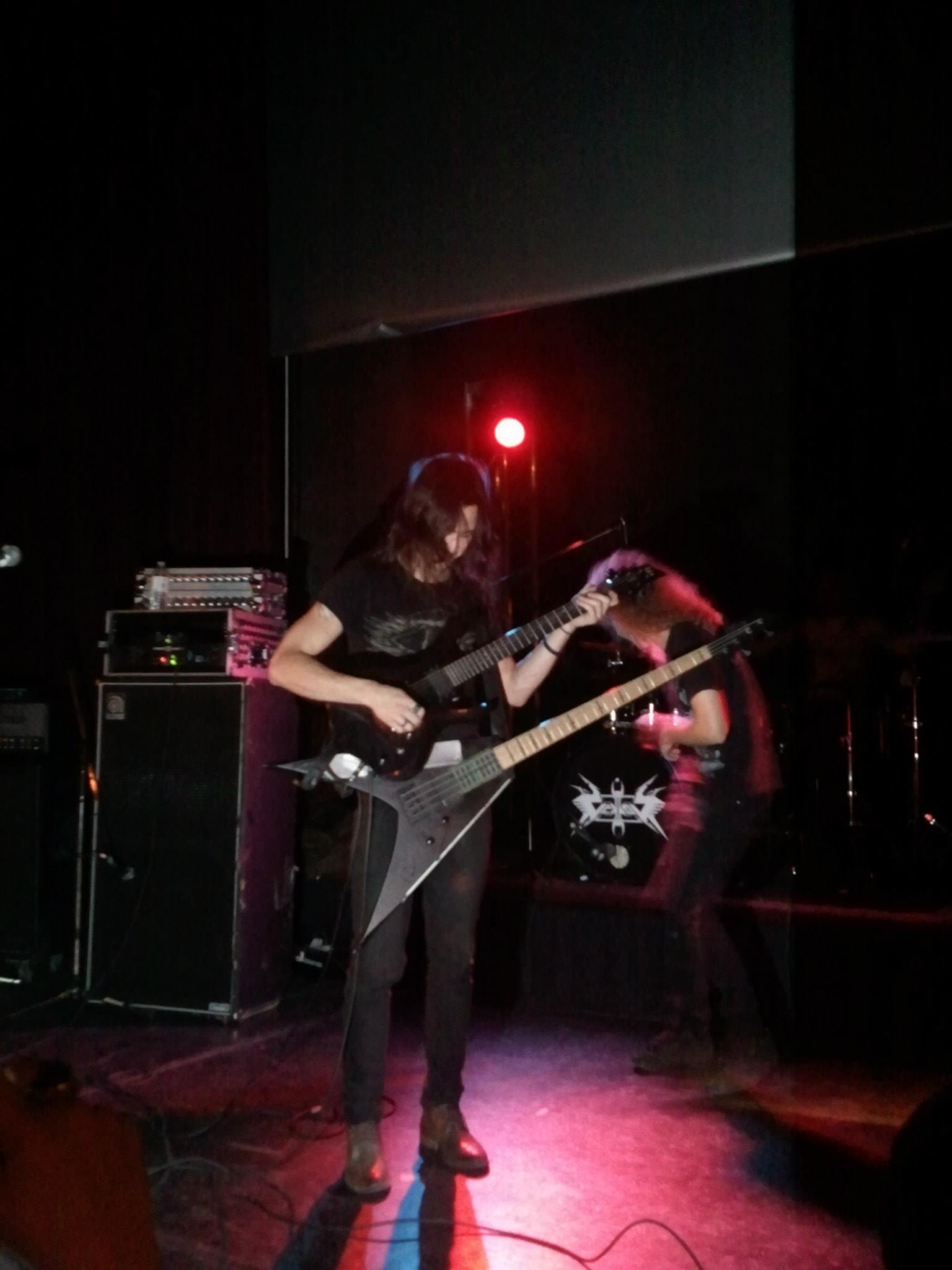
Frank Chin and Erik Nelson during a Vektor headline show in Hamilton, Ontario, 2012

In the summer of 2012, Vektor headlined a small tour, and, in November, opened on an extended tour with Napalm Death, Municipal Waste, and Exhumed. In January 2013, the band played the Earache Records Showcase in California.

The band played their first European show at Hellfest in June 2013. They embarked on their first full European headlining tour in November and December 2015 alongside Angelus Apatrida and Distillator, which included an appearance at Eindhoven Metal Meeting, and culminated in a show at the Camden Underworld in London. In early 2016, the band toured the US opening for Voivod. After relocating to Philadelphia and several years of touring, their third album, Terminal Redux, a 70-minute concept album, was released on May 6, 2016.

In December 2016, guitarist Erik Nelson, bassist Frank Chin, and drummer Blake Anderson left the band, thus putting the band into hiatus, stating that there was "no big story or drama," but "people and personalities simply change and drift apart and we've reached our limit." Controversy ensued in June 2019, when David DiSanto's wife Katy made domestic abuse allegations against him, with video and photos of the supposed incident. Although legal proceedings were pursued against DiSanto in family court, a Temporary Protection From Abuse Order was issued against DiSanto on June 11, 2019. Katy advocated for DiSanto to receive help for his alleged alcoholism. DiSanto released a counter response a few weeks later, in which he stated, "There’s a person who has destroyed this entire band and, (surprise!) it wasn’t me."

=== Reformation with new lineup and Transmissions of Chaos (2020–present) ===
In May 2020, DiSanto and Nelson reformed Vektor with drummer Mike Ohlson and bassist Stephen Coon, working on new material and preparing multiple tour dates in 2021. On December 16, 2020, Vektor released their first song in four years, "Activate", taken from the split EP with Cryptosis, Transmissions of Chaos, released on February 25, 2021.

In September 2022, Vektor signed with Century Media Records and announced the recording of their fourth album. Two days later, Century Media dropped Vektor because of the past domestic violence allegations against DiSanto. DiSanto released a second statement, clarifying further details of the supposed incident. In January 2023, the music festival cruise 70000 Tons of Metal announced Vektor and dropped them a day later.

In October 2025, Vektor live-debuted the song "Skeptic's Eye" while on tour in Japan. The song marked the band's first released material since the announcement of their upcoming album.

== Band members ==
Current members

- David DiSanto – vocals, lead and rhythm guitar (2002–present)
- Erik Nelson – lead and rhythm guitar (2004–2016, 2020–present)
- Stephen Coon – bass guitar (2020–present)
- Mike Ohlson – drums (2020–present)

Former members

- Mike Tozzi – bass guitar (2006–2008)
- Adam Anderson – drums (2004–2007)
- Kian Ahmad – drums (2007)
- Frank Chin – bass guitar (2008–2016)
- Blake Anderson – drums (2007–2016)

Timeline

== Discography ==
=== Studio albums ===
- Black Future (2009)
- Outer Isolation (2011)
- Terminal Redux (2016)

=== Demos ===
- Nucleus (as Locrian) (2004)
- Demolition (2006)
- Hunger for Violence/Accelerating Universe (2007)

=== Singles ===
- "Scion AV Label Showcase – Earache Records" (2013)
- "Ultimate Artificer" (2015)
- "Charging the Void" (2016)
- "Pillars of Sand" (2016)
- "Activate" (2020)

=== EPs ===
- Transmissions of Chaos (2021) (split with Cryptosis)
