= Head Break Solution =

Studio album by Icon in Me
- Released: July 8, 2011
- Genre: Alternative metal, melodic death metal
- Length: 55:44
- Label: Goomba Music
- Producer: Jacob Hansen

Icon in Me chronology
Human Museum (2009)	Head Break Solution (2011)

Head Break Solution is a second studio album by the Russian metal band Icon in Me.

== Track listing ==
1. Suicide World - Intro (1:13)
2. Wasted Ways (4:45)
3. Face It (4:06)
4. The Quest (4:49)
5. Un-Slaved (4:50)
6. Lost for Nothing (4:10)
7. Flood Kills (4:29)
8. Nuclear Drama (3:48)
9. Tired and Broken (4:03)
10. Through the Sights (2:45)
11. Aspects of the Unknown (4:36)
12. Solid Child (3:42)

=== Bonus tracks ===
1. Thousand Wars (3:44)
2. Dead Salvation (4:44)

== Personnel ==
- Ben Schigel – Mixing
- Maor Appelbaum – Mastering
