= Tasters (band) =

Italian band

- Also known as: Taster's Choice
- Origin: Livorno, Italy
- Genres: Metalcore; melodic metalcore; electronicore
- Years active: 1999–present
- Labels: Nuclear Blast; Shark; Gencross; Bagana
- Members: Daniele Nelli; Luke Pezzini; Tommy Antonini; Carlo Cremascoli; Fabrizio Pagni; Ale "Demonoid" Lera
- Website: www.myspace.com/tasterschoice7

Tasters (formerly known as Taster's Choice) is an Italian metalcore band from Livorno, Italy. They formed in 1999 and have released two studio albums, Shining (2005) and The Rebirth (2009).

As part of the metalcore scene, Tasters has opened for Cancer Bats, Thirty Seconds to Mars, Sonic Syndicate, Evergreen Terrace, Terror, Aiden and other American bands touring abroad. In December 2009, they toured with Scottish band Bleed from Within and as headliners in February–March 2010, also touring Russia for 30 shows. In June 2011, Tasters announced that the band has signed to Nuclear Blast for the release of their album Reckless Till the End.

== Discography ==
As Taster's Choice

- Shining (2005)
- The Rebirth (2009)

As Tasters

- Reckless Till the End (2011)
- De Rerum Natura (2017)

== Band members ==
Current

- Luke Pezzini – guitar
- Fabrizio Pagni – keyboards, piano, backing vocals
- Andrea Bessone – drums
- Manuel Manca – vocals

Past

- Marco Bassini – vocals
- Mattia Biagini – bass
- Francesco Tonarini – percussion
- Pietro Marsili – drums
- Simone Fiori – guitar
- Filippo Gherardi "Dj Plasma" – DJ console
- Daniele Nelli – vocals (currently in Upon This Dawning)
- Ale "Demonoid" Lera – drums
- Carlo Cremascoli – bass
- Tommy Antonini – guitar
