= A Moment in Chiros =

Studio album by Lance King
- Released: November 7, 2011
- Recorded: July–August 2011 at Hansen Studios in Esbjerg, Denmark, Nightmare Studios in St. Paul, Minnesota, USA, et al.
- Genres: Power metal, Progressive metal
- Length: 61:47
- Label: Nightmare Records World Rubicon Records Japan
- Producers: Jacob Hansen, Kim Olesen

A Moment in Chiros is American heavy metal vocalist Lance King's studio debut album as a solo artist, featuring the musical contributions of many of his friends, contemporaries and business associates.

== Background ==
The genesis of A Moment in Chiros was King's desire to re-involve himself in recording music, though on a more limited basis after spreading himself thinly between bands such as Avian, Krucible and Decibel; at a young age Lance began witnessing cases of the 11:11 time prompt phenomenon gradually increasing in the last few years it was becoming a daily occurrence leading Lance to learn more about this and the other number prompts associated with it as he witnessed these. Leading to deep spiritual personal revelations, he felt drawn to writing a story about it. On June 30, King e-mailed numerous musicians he desired to write alongside, with conceptual ideas, rough demos and the deadline of November 11, 2011 (following from the concept). Though this deadline was quickly approaching, the "wealth of musicians" King described as responding to his offer over the next two weeks pooled together to create almost two albums' worth of material; the next stage was the lyrics, which King had researched extensively before officially declaring the project, and recording proceeded smoothly within King's and Hansen's studios and the residences of the participants.

One of the album's central concepts, reflected in its title, is the Kairos Moment, "a moment in 'infinity,' a moment in God's time, a moment that creates destiny" as King states, although there are multiple sub-themes, ranging from patterns and their meanings, particularly numerical ones including double and triple 3's, 8's and 11's, to political deception, spirituality, numberology and Christian philosophy. King characterizes the overall message as "extremely deep" and one which is delivered through both lyrics and the music designed around them. A slice of profits from the album's sales are donated to combating human trafficking through the nonprofit Not for Sale Campaign.

== Reception ==
A Moment in Chiros was overall warmly received by critics. Long-time fans of King have declared the album's summation of his stylistic range creates an ideal gateway into his career, with Hardrock Haven branding it "the most intricate and interesting album Lance King has ever participated in, and one that should please fans of his previous efforts." Reviewers also noticed similarities with the bands of both primary and secondary composers, specifically Anubis Gate, whose guitarist/keyboardist Kim Olesen possesses the most instrumental credits on the album, and the songwriting contributions of Myrath members Malek Ben Arbia and Elyes Bouchoucha were likened to those of their home band.

== Track listing ==
All lyrics are written by Lance King.

No.	Title	Music	Length
1.	"A Sense of Urgency"	King, Fred Colombo	3:43
2.	"Awakening"	King, Markus Sigfridsson	5:29
3.	"Manifest Destiny"	King, Shane Dhiman, Michael Hansen	5:05
4.	"Given Choice"	King, Jacob Hansen	5:09
5.	"A Moment in Chiros"	King, Kim Olesen	7:33
6.	"Dance of Power"	King, J. Hansen, Olesen	5:04
7.	"Kibou"	King, Mistheria	4:42
8.	"Infinity Divine"	King, Sigfridsson	6:13
9.	"Joy Everlasting"	King, Olesen, Elyes Bouchoucha, Malek Ben Arbia	5:32
10.	"Sacred Systems"	King, Michael Harris	6:14
11.	"Transformation"	King, Tore St Moren, Colombo	7:13
12.	"Gotta Let Go (Exclusive Japanese Bonus Track)"	King, Jacob Hansen	6:12
Total length:			61:47

== Personnel ==
=== Primary musicians ===
- Lance King – all vocals, all vocal melodies except choruses of "Awakening" and "A Moment in Chiros"
- Kim Olesen – guitars (tracks 3, 5–11), lead guitar (track 1), bass (tracks 1, 2, 5, 6, 8, 9, 11), keyboards, chorus melody on "A Moment in Chiros"
- Morten Gade Sørensen – drums

=== Secondary musicians ===
- Michael Harris - lead and rhythm guitars, keyboards, bass (track 10)
- Markus Sigfridsson - lead and rhythm guitars, keyboards (tracks 2, 8), chorus melody on "Awakening"
- Malek Ben Arbia - lead and rhythm guitars (track 9)
- Vince Benaim - rhythm guitar (track 1)
- Shane Dhiman - guitars (track 3)
- Jacob Hansen - guitars (tracks 4, 6), bass (track 4)
- Tore St Moren - guitars (track 11)
- Fred Colombo - keyboards (tracks 1, 11), outro of "Transformation"
- Elyes Bouchoucha - keyboards (track 9)
- Giuseppe "Mistheria" Iampieri - piano (track 7)
- Michael Hansen - bass (track 3)
- Anis Jouini - bass (track 9)
- Tomy King - violin (tracks 2, 8)

=== Production ===
- Jacob Hansen - producer, mixing and mastering
- Kevin Codfert - additional tracking on "Joy Everlasting"
- Kim Olesen - Pre-production, arrangements, mixing
- Markus Sigfridsson - cover art, layout
- Lee King, Esa Ahola - photography
