= Stormzone =

Northern Irish heavy metal band

Stormzone is a heavy metal band from Northern Ireland formed in 2004. The band's classic line-up consisted of vocalist John "Harv" Harbinson, bassist Graham McNulty, guitarists Steve Moore and Dave Shields, and drummer Davy Bates. Previous members included Andrew Baxter, Steve Doherty, Keith Harris, Junior Afrifa and Peťo Uhrin.

The band released four studio albums on SPV Records, three albums on Metal Nation Records, and one on Metalapolis Records. The band enjoyed considerable success, playing major rock festivals such as Sweden Rock. Firefest, Z-Rock, Raismes Fest and Wacken Open Air, as well as performing extensively across the UK and Europe. Their releases and performances have been met with general critical acclaim from publications such as Classic Rock. Two albums have had covers designed by renowned fantasy artist Rodney Matthews, with more recent albums featuring artwork by John Harbinson himself.

Other notable activities for the band have included performing as George Lynch's band, the "Lynch Mob", and supporting Y&T, White Lion, Tesla, Stryper, Sebastian Bach and Saxon.

Initially beginning as a studio-only band crafting keyboard-driven AOR style rock, culminating in the release of the well-received Caught In The Act, Stormzone have taken a distinctive turn in recent years, focusing on a more guitar-heavy, NWOBHM style classic metal sound, with power metal influences. This re-invention of the band's sound has seen them enjoy considerable success, starting with a record contract with SPV/Steamhammer Records, and later with Metal Nations Records, under the management of Jess Cox (Neat Records/ original Tygers of Pan Tang vocalist), and then with German label Metalapolis Records in 2020.

== Early history ==
Stormzone were formed as a studio project in 2004, by current and founding vocalist John "Harv" Harbinson. Harbinson had previously enjoyed success in bands such as No Sweat, Den of Thieves (who enjoyed considerable and continuing success in the Japanese rock market), Fastway, and a brief tenure in Sweet Savage. Beginning life as a new creative outlet for Harbinson after a brief break from the rock industry, Harbinson set about recruiting session musicians: drummer Julian Watson, bassist Pete Macken, keyboardist Stephen Prosser (who would later find success as keyboardist for Queen tribute-act Flash Harry), and guitarist Keith Harris, who would continue to work with Harbinson through all subsequent incarnations for the band.

After a tenure with this line-up, which saw the release Caught In The Act, Harbinson decided as a side project to join an Iron maiden tribute band formed by Steven Doherty and Stephen Stranaghan. He joined bassist Graham McNulty, guitarists Steven Doherty and Stephen Stranaghan and brought along long-term bandmate Keith Harris. During rehearsals, the band decided to compose some original material, which led to the realisation of Stormzone's current incarnation as a functioning live band.

In 2008, current drummer Davy Bates replaced Glenn Gray as a stand-in for the "Firefest" festival in Nottingham, England, which led to a permanent slot within the band's line-up. Following extensive live success in Europe, the band decided to record a new album in the vein of their rapidly evolving classic metal style, having already caught the attention of rock industry producer/DJ Neal Kay, (famed as the man who discovered Iron Maiden) who consequently agreed to co-produce the resulting album, 2010's Death Dealer.

== Later history ==
Following Death Dealer and a subsequent live tour supporting Tesla, and an appearance at 2009's Sweden Rocks Festival guitarist Steve Doherty left the band due to family commitments. He was replaced by 21-year-old guitarist Chris Polin, who had been known to the band due to his presence in Belfast metal band Sorrowfall. Six weeks after Doherty's departure, the band were back onstage, supporting Y&T in a sold-out show in Stormzone's home-town of Belfast.

After the departure of Chris Polin in early 2011, Steve Moore joined the band. Having played previously with Riff Master General and Fireland, he has toured with the likes of Kreator and DragonForce and has appeared on, and engineered, several albums.

After supporting Stryper on the Spanish leg of their 2011 European tour, the band played the W.E.T. stage at Wacken Open Air Festival in Germany. They then set about recording their third album Zero To Rage, which was released by SPV/Steamhammer in November 2011. It was produced by Steve Moore at FireMachine Studio in Antrim, Northern Ireland.

Three Kings was released in September 2013 on Metal Nation Records. An official video for the title track was recorded in August 2013.

After several tours in the UK and Ireland with Saxon, and appearances at Sonisphere Festival and Bloodstock Open Air in 2014, the band recorded their fifth album Seven Sins, again produced by Steve Moore at FireMachine Studio. The album is currently available via Metal Nation Records.

The band recorded a further album Lucifer's Factory on Metal Nations before moving to German label Metalapolis Records for their most recent album Ignite The Machine in 2020.

Moore and McNulty left the band in 2023 to concentrate on power metal band, Whiteabbey.

== Members ==
- John "Harv" Harbinson - Lead Vocals
- Steve Moore - Lead and Rhythm Guitars
- David Shields - Lead and Rhythm Guitars
- Graham McNulty - Bass Guitar And Backing Vocals
- David Bates - Drums

== Equipment ==
- Graham McNulty - Spector basses and Hartke amplifiers
- Steve Moore - Jackson guitars, Fractal Audio Axe-FX, Line 6 wirelesses, D'Addario strings

== Discography ==
=== Caught in the Act (2007) ===
- Spellbound
- Hold Onto Her Love
- Stranger Things Have Happened
- Nervous Breakdown
- Crying In The Rain
- Call Of The Wild
- Beating Of A Heart
- New World
- Tuggin' At My Heartstrings
- Sky High
- Rock On Through The Night

=== Death Dealer (2010) ===
- Death Dealer
- Secret Gateway
- The Memory Never Dies
- Immortals
- Destiny Of Legends/The Legend Carries On
- Labyrinth
- Wasted Lives
- Stand Up And Fight
- The Chosen One
- World Of Sorrow
- The Greatest Sacrifice
- Final Journey

=== Zero To Rage (2011) ===
- Where We Belong
- Zero To Rage
- The Jester's Laughter
- This Is Our Victory
- Fear Hotel
- Hail The Brave
- Uprising
- Last Man Fighting
- Empire Of Fear
- Monsters
- Voice Inside My Head
- Cuchulainn's Story

=== Three Kings (2013) ===
- The Pain Inside
- Spectre
- Stone Heart
- Alive
- Night of the Storm
- Beware in Time
- Three Kings
- The Pass Loning
- I am the One
- Wallbreaker
- Never Trust
- B.Y.H.
- Out of Eden

=== Seven Sins (2015) ===
- Bathsheba
- Another Rainy Night
- Your Time Has Come
- The One That Got Away
- I Know Your Pain
- Seven Sins
- You're Not the Same
- Raise the Knife
- Abandoned Souls
- Special Brew
- Master of Sorrow
- Born of the Damned

=== Lucifer's Factory (2018) ===
- Dark Hedges
- Lucifer's Factory
- Cushy Glen
- Last Night in Hell
- Albhartach
- We Are Strong
- Broken Window
- The Heaven You Despise
- Hallows' Eve
- Your Hell Falls Down
- In for the Kill
- The Last Goodbye
- Time to Go

=== Ignite The Machine (2020) ===
- Tolling Of The Bell
- Ignite The Machine
- My Disease
- Each Setting Sun
- Dragon Cartel
- Nothing To Fear
- Revolution
- New Age Necromancer
- Dealer's Reign
- Flame That Never Dies
- Under Her Spell
- This Is Heavy Metal
