= Icon in Me =

Russian metal band

- Origin: Moscow, Russia
- Genres: Metalcore, groove metal, melodic death metal
- Years active: 2007–present
- Labels: Goomba, Massacre
- Members: Tony JJ; D.Frans; MasterMike; Morten
- Past members: Konstantin; Artyom

Icon in Me (iMi) is a Russian metal band.

== History ==
The band formed in 2007 in Moscow. The group is composed of members Tony JJ (vocals), D.Frans (guitar), Artyom (bass) and Morten (drums). The band's debut album was released in 2009. Musicians played concerts together with well-known groups such as Machine Head and Lamb of God. Icon in me has released two albums and four singles to date.

== Discography ==
=== Albums ===
- Human Museum (2009)
- Head Break Solution (2011)

=== Singles ===
- Moments (2009)
- The Quest (2011)
- Lost for Nothing (2012)
- Black Water (2013)
