= The Moon and the Nightspirit =

Hungarian folk music duo

Background information
- Origin: Hungary
- Genres: Medieval folk rock; neofolk
- Years active: 2003 – present
- Label: Equilibrium Music
- Members: Ágnes Tóth; Mihály Szabó

The Moon and the Nightspirit is a Hungarian folk music duo founded in 2003 by Ágnes Tóth and Mihály Szabó. Their songs deal mostly with pagan fairy tales and shamanism.

== History ==
The lyrics of their debut album Of Dreams Forgotten and Fables Untold were mostly in English but with two titles in Hungarian. The softly melancholic album has been compared to the music of Ataraxia and Chandeen. Live performances with songs from the album included an appearance on Hungarian National Television.

The second album Regő Rejtem (lit.: I conjure Magic) was released in 2007 and is completely sung in Hungarian. During the supporting tour through much of Europe The Moon and the Nightspirit played at festivals such as Wave-Gotik-Treffen (Germany) and Castle Party (Poland).

In 2009 the band released their third album Ősforrás, a more varied work that focuses on the "wise elder" and natural mysticism. It has been compared to the Pagan folk of Omnia but was said to be more transparent for the listener. The Side-Line magazine called it the band's most diversified and accomplished album so far.

Later albums including Metatnoia (2017) were noted by reviewers for exploring world music. The following album Aether (2020) received notice for the expanding range of instruments played by Tóth and Szabó, such as violin, dulcimer, harp, kalimba, and acoustic guitar. Their 2026 album Seed of the Formless was noted for adding goth and doom metal elements to the group's sound.

== Critical response ==
The Moon and the Nightspirit have received favourable ratings by reviewers. Their style has been called slightly oriental as well as a mix of medieval music and Hungarian folk songs, while Ágnes Tóth's singing has been compared to Elisabeth Toriser of Dargaard. They are also acclaimed for being multi-instrumentalists using such traditional instruments as the Mongolian morin khuur and the Slovak shepherds pipe fujara.

== Discography ==
- Of Dreams Forgotten and Fables Untold (2005)
- Regő Rejtem (2007)
- Ősforrás (2009)
- Mohalepte (2011)
- Holdrejtek (2014)
- Metanoia (2017)
- Aether (2020)
- Seed of the Formless (2026)
