= Empyrium =

German band

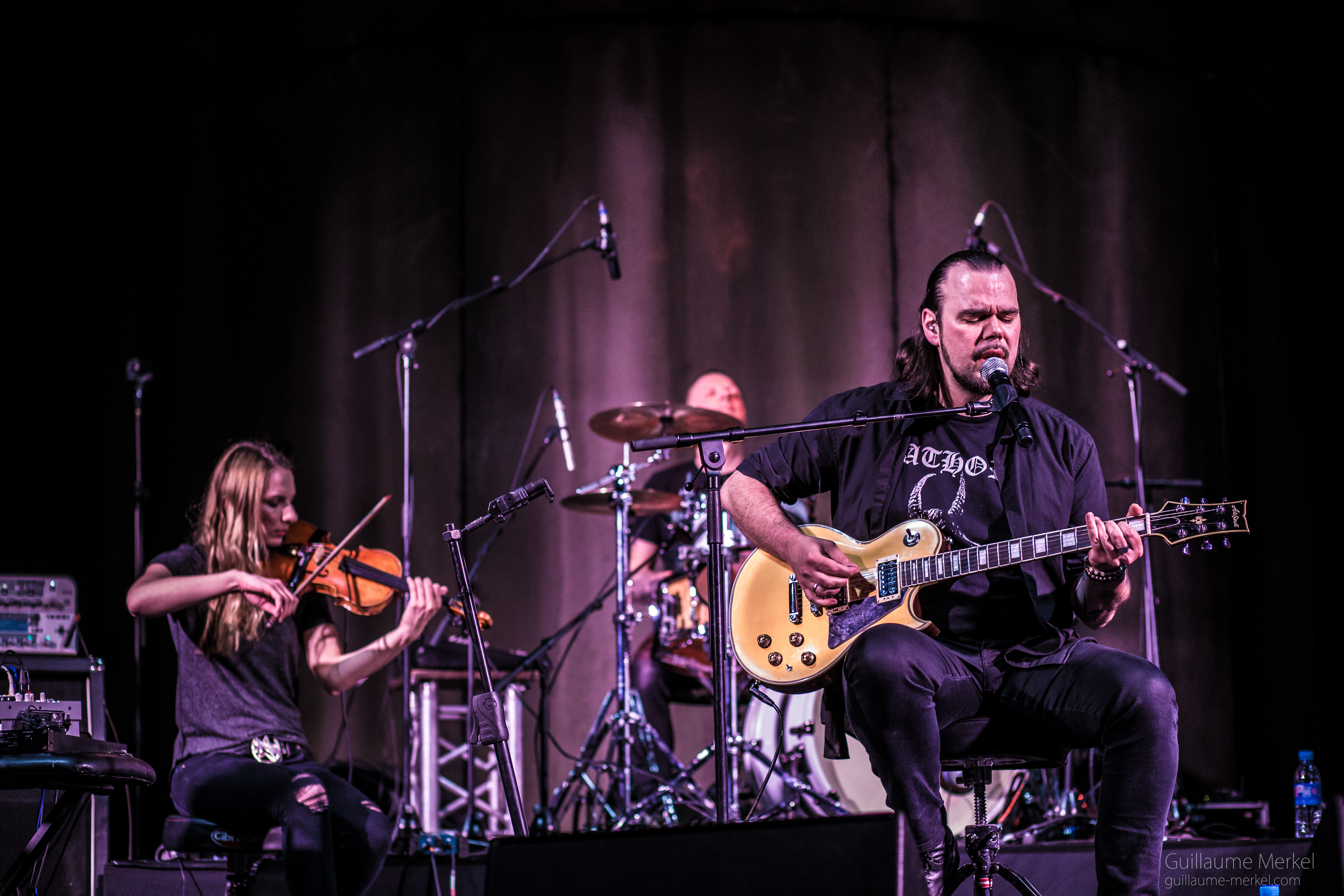
Empyrium at the Opera national du Rhin, Strasbourg – 2017

Empyrium is a German symphonic folk/doom metal and later neofolk/dark folk band.

== History ==
Empyrium was founded in 1994 by Markus Stock (mostly using the pseudonym Ulf Theodor Schwadorf) and Andreas Bach, but later many other musicians participated.

The band draws inspiration from nature. Empyrium are often referred to as a dark folk or apocalyptic folk band, expressing in their music sentiments akin to those expressed by some other 'legislators' of the genre, Forseti, Orplid, and Ulver (Kveldssanger). Like the Norwegian black metal band Burzum, Empyrium also used a Theodor Kittelsen drawing on one of their album covers (Where at Night the Wood Grouse Plays).

=== Metal records ===
Their first two albums, A Wintersunset and Songs of Moors and Misty Fields, following a demo entitled ...Der wie ein Blitz vom Himmel fiel..., are considered doom metal (or folk metal) with folk and symphonic influences. They combine harsh and operatic male vocals, with deep slow guitar parts and atmospheric sounds.

=== Acoustic records ===
The following two albums, Where at Night the Wood Grouse Plays and Weiland are acoustic, display a constantly heavier neofolk influence. Instead of keyboards, the band switched to acoustic instruments such as acoustic guitars, violins, cellos and the flute. Operatic male vocals are still used, and in Weiland the band uses choir vocals and the piano. Though the music remains dark and melancholic, Empyrium's music has largely moved away from metal.

=== Departure ===
After their 2002 album, Weiland, the band decided to stop recording. As Schwadorf himself put it,

Empyrium has explored nature-mystics since 1994, and after 8 years we feel to move on and made a glorious farewell to the concept with "Weiland"

=== A Retrospective ===
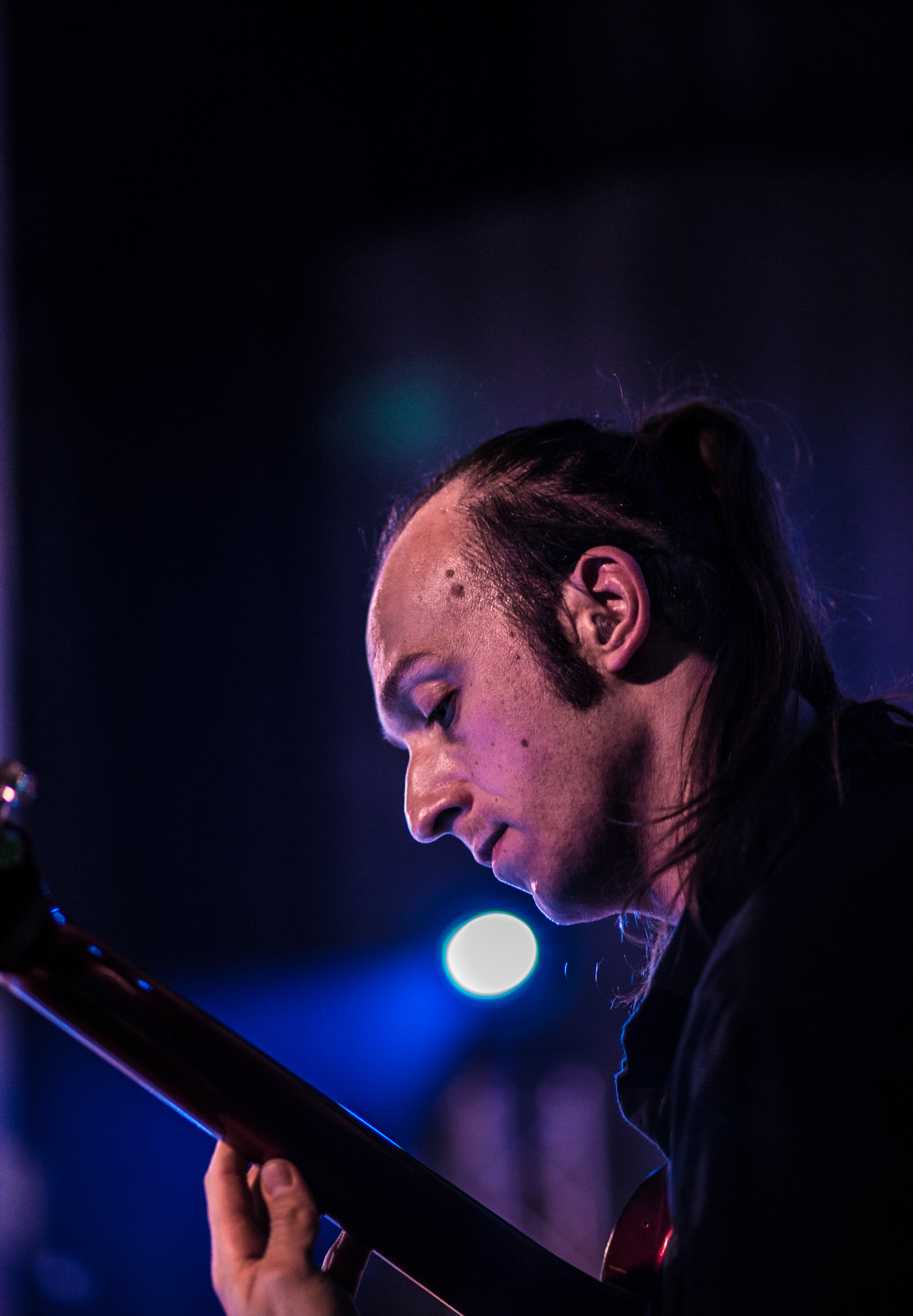
Empyrium at the Opera national du Rhin, Strasbourg – 2017

In August 2006, Empyrium's label, Prophecy Productions, announced publicly for the first time that a new album was going to be released in late November the same year. Called A Retrospective, it is a look back on the history of the band. Aside from ten remastered tracks from their previous albums, it contains a re-recorded version of The Franconian Woods In Winter's Silence from the album A Wintersunset, as well as two new tracks in the neofolk style of late Empyrium (Der Weiher and Am Wolkenstieg). The sixty-page booklet provides an extensive account of the musical influences of the band, and how Empyrium has changed over the years. The album leaked onto the Internet in early November 2006.

=== Comeback ===
On 17 September 2010, Prophecy Productions and Schwadorf personally announced that the band had reunited and revealed plans to release a new album soon, beside contributing to the label's upcoming v/a compilation Whom The Moon A Nightsong Sings.

We are incredibly happy to announce that Empyrium, the most renowned Prophecy act ever, has decided to reunite and to record new music! Here's the official statement of Schwadorf on the reunion: "Since the rumours start to spread we think it's about time to make this official: Empyrium is alive again! Our first new sign of life will be the song 'The Days Before The Fall' on the Prophecy Prod. compilation 'Whom The Moon A Nightsong Sings' but we have plans for more! The spirit is back and it really feels right to us to start writing songs with Empyrium again. We are not in a rush though so don't expect a full length today or tomorrow but we have the patience and faith to make this new songs outstanding and unique. Just as Empyrium ever was..."

== Discography ==
Demos

- ...Der wie ein Blitz vom Himmel fiel... (1995)

Studio albums

- A Wintersunset... (1996)
- Songs of Moors and Misty Fields (1997)
- Where at Night the Wood Grouse Plays (1999)
- Weiland (2002)
- The Turn of the Tides (2014)
- Über den Sternen (2021)

EPs

- Drei Auszüge aus Weiland (2002)
- Dead Winter Ways (2013)
- The Mill (2015)

Compilation albums

- A Retrospective... (2006)
- A Retrospective... (boxed set, 2006)
- Whom the Moon a Nightsong Sings (as a contributing artist to the compilation, 2010)
- 1994–2014 (boxed set, 2014)

Live albums

- Into the Pantheon (2013)
- Bochum | Christuskirche | 2012 (2013)

== Line-up ==
- Ulf Theodor Schwadorf (g, b, dr&p, v, etc.); Andreas Bach (k)
- Ulf Theodor Schwadorf (g, b, dr&p, v, etc.); Andreas Bach (k); Nadine Moelter (flute)
- Ulf Theodor Schwadorf (g, b, dr&p, v, etc.); Andreas Bach (k); Nadine Moelter (flute); Thomas Helm (bv)
- Ulf Theodor Schwadorf (g, b, dr&p, v, etc.); Thomas Helm (bv); guests (Weiland)

== See also ==
- Noekk, reunion band of Empyrium members
- The Vision Bleak
- Nachtmahr
