= Songs of Moors and Misty Fields =

Studio album by Empyrium
- Released: June 13, 1997
- Genre: Doom metal, symphonic metal, folk metal, black metal
- Length: 44:49
- Label: Prophecy

Empyrium chronology
A Wintersunset... (1996)	Songs of Moors and Misty Fields (1997)	Where at Night the Wood Grouse Plays (1999)

Songs of Moors and Misty Fields (1997) is the second album by the German band Empyrium.

Elaborating on their previous full-length album, A Wintersunset... released a year before, with Songs of Moors... Empyrium delve into a more sophisticated intricacy of what is sometimes called "romantic metal", offering a complicated mix of percussion, flutes, bass guitars and synths, together with its will-be trademark deep baritone male vocals performed by Schwadorf himself (who also plays virtually all the instrument parties, except for keyboards).

The band's following two albums, Where at Night the Wood Grouse Plays (1999) and Weiland (2002), are purely acoustic.

== Track listing ==
No.	Title	Length
1.	"When Shadows Grow Longer"	1:26
2.	"The Blue Mists of Night"	6:24
3.	"Mourners"	9:15
4.	"Ode to Melancholy"	8:44
5.	"Lover's Grief"	9:08
6.	"The Ensemble of Silence"	9:52
Total length:		44:49

== Personnel ==
- Ulf Theodor Schwadorf - vocals, drums, guitars, bass, photography
- Nadine Mölter - cello, flute, photography
- Andreas Bach - synthesizer

=== Additional personnel ===
- Andreas Beck - engineering
- Jürgen Holzhausen - cover art, photography
- Martin Koller - executive producer
- Timo Ketola - digipack logo
