= Cyperus celans =

Scientific classification
- Kingdom: Plantae
- Clade: Tracheophytes
- Clade: Angiosperms
- Clade: Monocots
- Clade: Commelinids
- Order: Poales
- Family: Cyperaceae
- Genus: Cyperus
- Species: C. celans

Binomial name
- Cyperus celans Kukkonen

Species of sedge

Cyperus celans is a species of sedge that is native to southern parts of Iran.

== See also ==
- List of Cyperus species
