= Jenzig =

Mountain in Germany

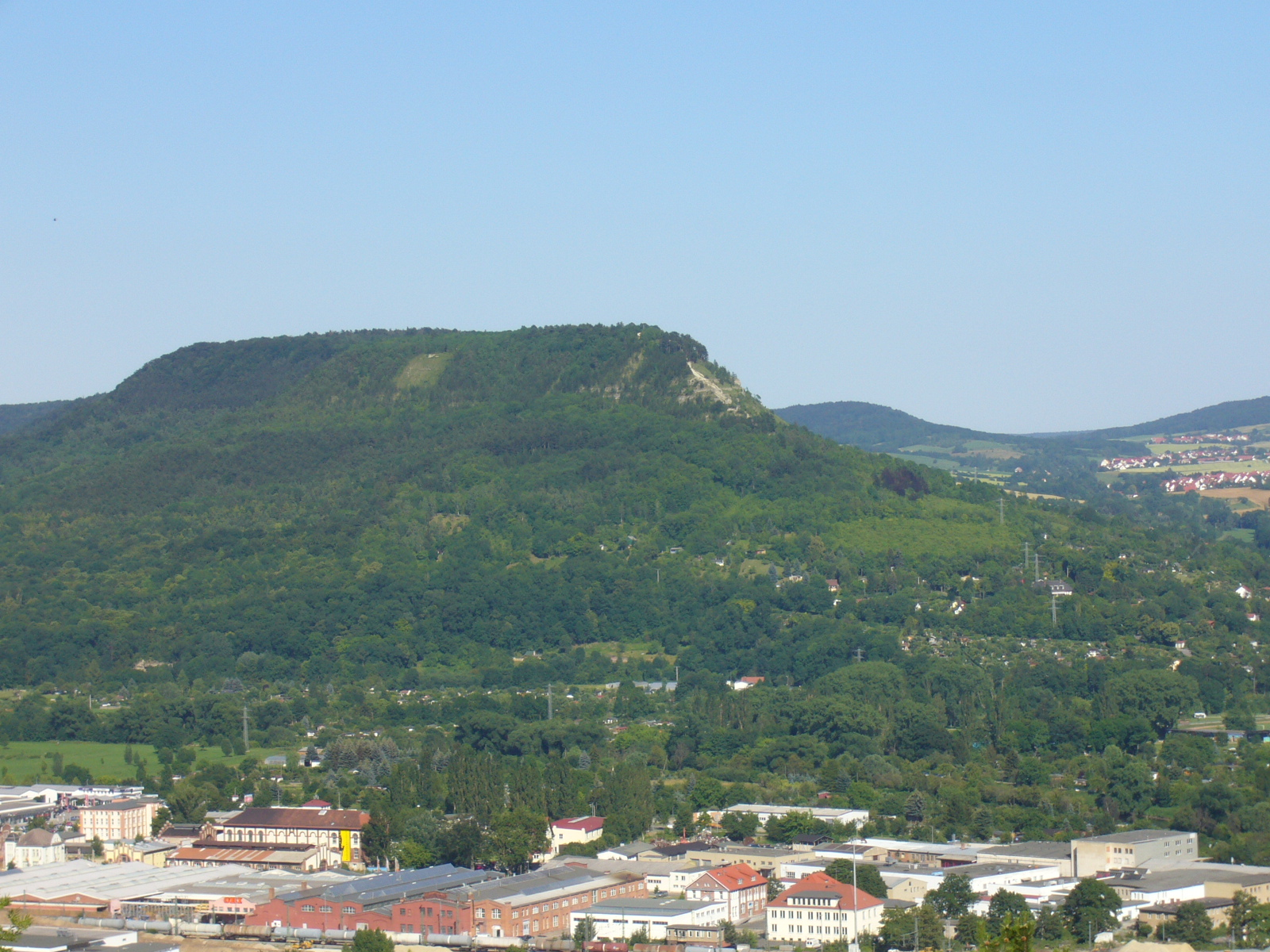

Highest point
- Elevation: 385.3 m (1,264 ft)
- Isolation: 1.78 km (1.11 mi) to Hausberg
- Coordinates: 50°56′28″N 11°38′7″E

Naming
- Language of name: German

Geography
- Location within Germany
- Country: Germany

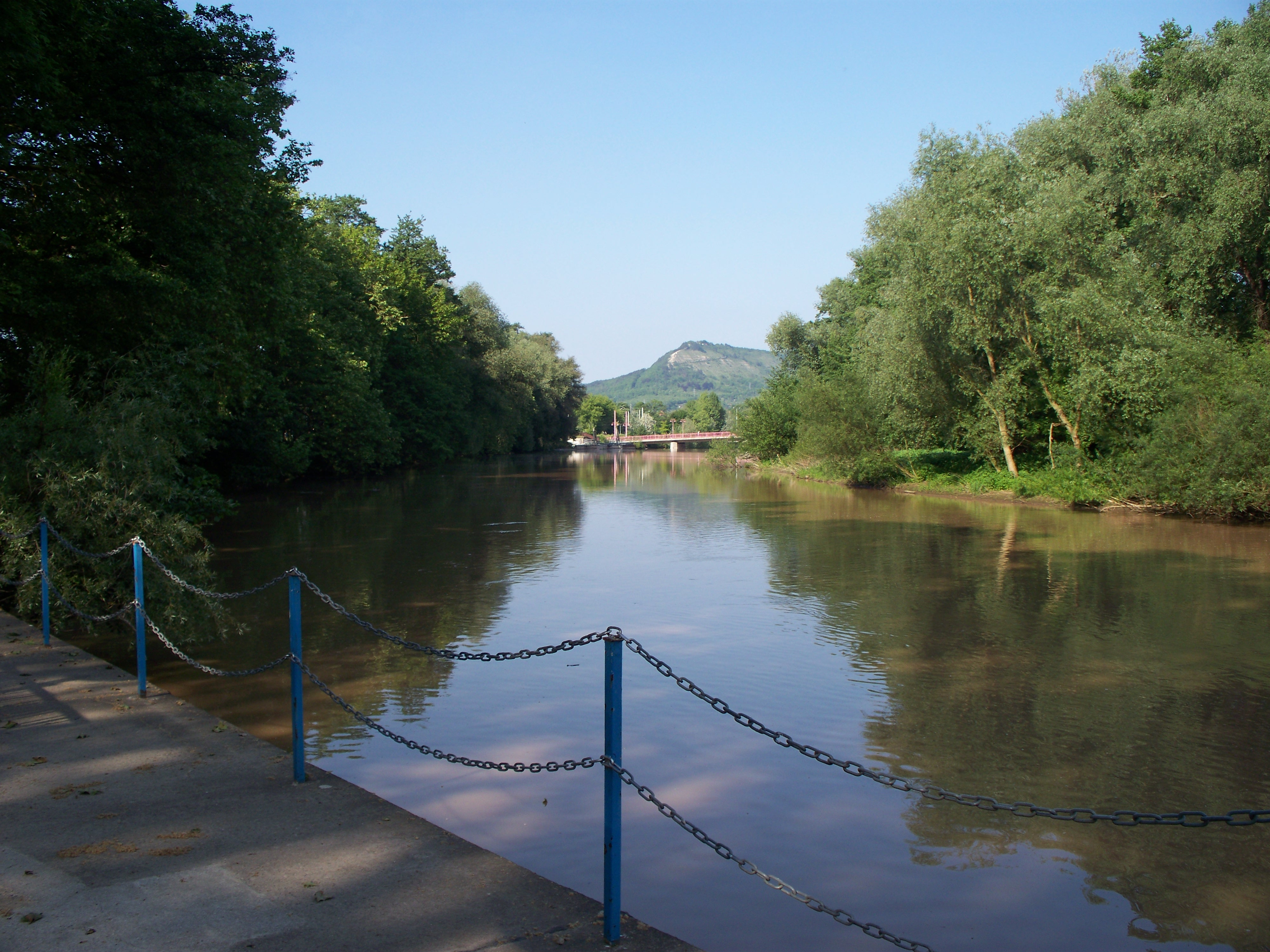
View of the Jenzig from Volkspark Oberaue

The Jenzig is a distinctive Muschelkalk mountain in Jena, Germany.

At 385.3 m above sea level, the Jenzig is one of the highest mountains in the Saale Valley area and is located northeast of the city center. Due to its distinctive shape ("Jenzignase", German for "Jenzig nose") it is considered to be one of the Seven Wonders of Jena.

On the summit stands the Jenzighaus, a restaurant with excellent views over the city.

The Jenzig forms the southwestern end of a semicircular ridge, the Hufeisen ("Horseshoe"). This wooded plateau runs from the Jenzig eastwards, forming an arc as it continues further north and then back westwards, where the Alte Gleisberg along with the Kunitzburg forms the other end. In the interior of this "horseshoe" is a small side valley of the Saale valley, containing the villages of Kunitz and Laasan.

== Formation ==
From its dome-shaped and elongated form, the mountain is evidently an eroded plateau formed by the action of the Saale river on the limestone of the area. This landscape is typical of the Middle Saale region.

== Prehistoric fortifications ==
Based on archaeological discoveries, the Jenzig was a fortified hilltop settlement during the time of the Urnfield culture (about 1300 BC to 800 BC), offering protection to the surrounding population. It was examined between 1856 and 1891 by Friedrich Klopfleisch, who performed several excavations. In 1936, a hoard was discovered while quarrying, which can now be found in the prehistoric collection of the University of Jena. The nearly 3.5 kg complex consists of 28 bronze objects such as neck and arm rings, spirals, a bejeweled disc, two sickles, a knife, a hatchet and a spiral plate fibula. It testifies to the religious sacrificial practices of people in the late Bronze Age.

Fortified prehistoric hill settlements contemporary to those found on the Jenzig are also known in the vicinity of the Alte Gleisberg near Bürgel, the Johannisberg near Lobeda and the Dohlenstein near Kahla.

The first mention of the mountain as "montem genzege" appears in a document of Frederick Barbarossa from 1158. It also mentions the Gleisberg.

From the 12th to 19th centuries, the slopes of the Jenzig were used as vineyards. In the 21st century, a group of hobby winemakers have revived the tradition of viticulture on the Jenzig.

In 2018, a series of plastic models of prehistoric reptiles, the "Saurierpfad" ("Saurian Path") was installed along the walking path leading up to the Jenzig summit. This was inspired by the discovery of Triassic reptile fossils discovered at the base of the mountain.

== Trivia ==
The Jenaer neofolk-group Forseti named their first album, released in 1999, after the Jenzig mountain.

In March 2010, a camel born during a guest performance at the circus "Eros" in Jena, was named "Jenzig".

The 2090-meter high Mount Jenzig in northern Victoria Land in Antarctica was named in 1988 by Klaus Duphorn (Kiel University) after the Jenzig.

Jenzig-Verlag, a regional publishing house based in Golmsdorf (Saale-Holzland-Kreis) near Jena, took its name from the mountain.
