= Neun Welten =

German band

Neun Welten (meaning Nine Worlds in German, which relates to the nine worlds of Norse mythology) is a German music group primarily incorporating instrumental acoustic, traditional folk and dark folk in their music. The musical style is composed of dark folk, dreamy but also playful melodies and classical elements. The point of main emphasis of this young band from Halle and Leipzig is the acoustical orchestration. The sound carry off the audience in a calm atmosphere full of harmony and melancholy.

In 2005, Neun Welten was designated for the German Folk Award "RUTH 2005" in the Newcomer category.

In 2007 they went on tour with Finnish band Tenhi and Dornenreich/Elane.

The band also contributed their song Pan to Prophecy Productions' multi-artist compilation Whom the Moon a Nightsong Sings, published in 2010.

Since 2018, Italian bassist Giacomo Astorri has been a member of Neun Welten. In addition to his work with Neun Welten, Astorri has played in various metal bands, including The Dogma, Infernal Angels (guitar), ZAP (bass), Haggard and is currently a member of the Italian doom metal band Stryx (https://www.stryxband.com), whose debut album is in preparation. Besides his musical career, Astorri is also active as a professional concert and event photographer.

== Line-up ==
- Anja Hövelmann - recorder, clarinet
- Aline Deinert - violin, piano
- David Zaubitzer - acoustic guitar, cello
- Marten Winter - drums, percussion
- Meinolf Müller - acoustic guitar, jaw harp
- Giacomo Astorri - Basso

== Discography ==
=== Albums And EPs ===
Year	Title	Format, Special Notes
2001	Auf Ewig Wald	MCD
2004	Valg	MCD
2006	Vergessene Pfade	CD
2009	Destrunken	CD
2017	The Sea I'm Diving In	CD

=== Compilations ===
Year	Title	Format, Special Notes
2003	Flammenzauber III: Tonwerk Zum Festival	CD, limited to 500 copies. Live.
2003	Celebrant 2003 - Der mittelalterliche Klangkörper	
2005	Looking For Europe	4xCD box
2006	Legend And Lore	Auerbach/Prophecy Productions
2007	Spielmannstränen 2	Zillo
2010	Cantus I:Mediaeval Pagan Folk	Lichtbringer
2010	Whom The Moon A Nightsong Sings	Auerbach/Prophecy Productions
2010	Maere Compilation	Märchenstube
