= Syven =

Finnish band

- Origin: Riihimäki, Finland
- Genres: Ambient, neofolk, heavy metal
- Years active: 2007–present
- Labels: Vendlus Records; Audiokratik
- Members: Aslak Tolonen; Andy Koski-Semmens
- Website: Official Homepage

Syven is a Finnish band from Riihimäki, formed in 2007. The band released their début album Aikaintaite through Vendlus Records in 2011; the second album, Corpus Christi (Syven album), was released the following year.

== Biography ==
Syven was created in July 2007, after the vocalist Andy Koski-Semmens moved to Finland and decided to collaborate with the multi-instrumentalist and composer Aslak Tolonen, previously active in several bands, including Nest. Tolonen was composing new material when he noticed that his music had become darker and heavier, compared to the Nest's last release, prompting him to create a new band. In 2010, Syven released a demo, which was sent to various labels, and contributed one track, "How Fare the Gods?" to the compilation album Whom the Moon a Nightsong Sings. The following year, the band was signed by Vendlus Records and released its début album, Aikaintaite, on 6 December. Exactly a year after, the second album, Corpus Christi, was released. On 8 December 2012, Syven's first live performance took place in Brașov, Romania.

== Members ==
- Aslak Tolonen – all instruments
- Andy Koski-Semmens – vocals

== Discography ==
=== Albums ===
- Aikaintaite (2011)
- Corpus Christi (2012)

=== Compilations ===
- Whom the Moon a Nightsong Sings (2010)

=== Demos ===
- Promo 2010 (2010)
