= Varez =

Varez is a surname. Notable people with the surname include:

- Dietrich Varez (1939–2018), American printmaker-painter
- E. F. Varez (1780–1866), French playwright and novelist

== See also ==
- Vare
