= Tenhi =

Finnish neofolk band

- Origin: Finland
- Genres: Folk rock, progressive folk, neofolk
- Years active: 1996–present
- Labels: Prophecy Productions, UTUstudio
- Spinoffs: Harmaa
- Members: Tyko Saarikko; Ilmari Issakainen; Janina Lehto; Inka Eerola; Jaakko Hilppö; Tuukka Tolvanen
- Past members: Ilkka Salminen; Eleonora Lundell; Veera Partanen; Paula Lehtomäki
- Website: utustudio.com

Tenhi is a Finnish folk rock band formed in 1996.

The music of Tenhi is minimalistic and dark. Usually, the rhythm instrument lines follow the customs of modern rock music. The melodical instruments and vocals are however very heavily folk-influenced. The basic instrumentation of the band consists of acoustic guitar, bass and drums. Frequent additional instruments include piano, violin, viola and flute and less frequent didgeridoo, mouth harp, harmonium, cello, udu and synthesizer.

== Members ==
=== Current members ===
- Tyko Saarikko – acoustic guitar (1996–present), electric guitar (1996–1997), synthesizer (1996–present), vocals (1997–present), didgeridoo (1999–2002), Jew's harp (1999–2002), udu (2000–2002), piano (2004–present), harmonium (2004–2011, 2014–present), percussions (2004–2006)
- Ilmari Issakainen – bass (1998–present), guitar (1999–present), piano (1999–present), percussions (1999–2007), backing vocals (1999–present), drums (2000–present)
- Janina Lehto – flute (2000–2007, 2017–present), backing vocals (2017–present) (also vocals on "Airut:aamujen" (2004))
- Inka Eerola – violin (2000–2007, 2017–present)
- Jaakko Hilppö – backing vocals (2002–present), live bass (2000–present) (also session bass on "Väre" (2002))
- Tuukka Tolvanen – backing vocals (2003–present), live acoustic guitar (2000–present)

=== Former members ===
- Ilkka Salminen – drums (1997-2000), bass (1997–1998, 2004–2008), acoustic guitar (1997–2008), synthesizer (1997–1998), lead vocals (1998–2008), harmonium (2004–2008), percussions (2004–2008)
- Eleonora Lundell – violin (1998–2000), viola/alto violin (2000–2003)
- Veera Partanen – flute (1999–2000)
- Paula Lehtomäki – viola (2008–2012)

=== Live/session members ===
- Jussi Lehtinen – piano (2001–2007, 2015–present) (also session backing vocals on "Saivo" (2011), session backing vocals on "Valkama" (2023) (track "Ulapoi"))
- Raimo Kovalainen – drums (2001–2007, 2015–present)

=== Former live/session members ===
- Kirsikka Wiik – cello (on "Väre" (2002))
- Paula Rantamäki – violin (2007–2017) (also session backing vocals on "Valkama" (2023) (tracks "Kesävihanta" and "Aina sininen aina"))
- Janina Lehto – flute (on "Saivo" (2011))
- Heikki Hannikainen – contrabass (on "Saivo" (2011))
- Elisa Ollikainen – cello (on "Saivo" (2011))
- Thomas "Inve" Riesner – live guest violin (2015, Prophecy Fest 2015) (Dornenreich)
- Jochen "Evíga" Stock – live guest acoustic guitar (2015, Prophecy Fest 2015) (Dornenreich)
- Miika Vuoristo – viola (on "Valkama" (2023) (track "Ulapoi"))

== Discography ==
- Kertomuksia (demo, 1997)
- Promo Tape (demo, 1997)
- Hallavedet (mcd, 1998)
- Kauan (CD, 1999)
- Airut:ciwi (mcd, 2001)
- Väre (CD, 2002)
- Airut:aamujen (CD, 2004, originally released under Harmaa name as a side-project, in 2006 was re-issued under Tenhi name)
- Maaäet (CD, 2006)
- Folk Aesthetic 1996-2006 (compilation, 3CD in book format, 2007)
- Saivo (CD, 2011)
- Valkama (CD, 2023)

=== Compilation appearances ===
- Whom the Moon a Nightsong Sings (compilation, 2010) (V/A, track "Kausienranta")
