= Nucleus Torn =

Swiss metal/neofolk band

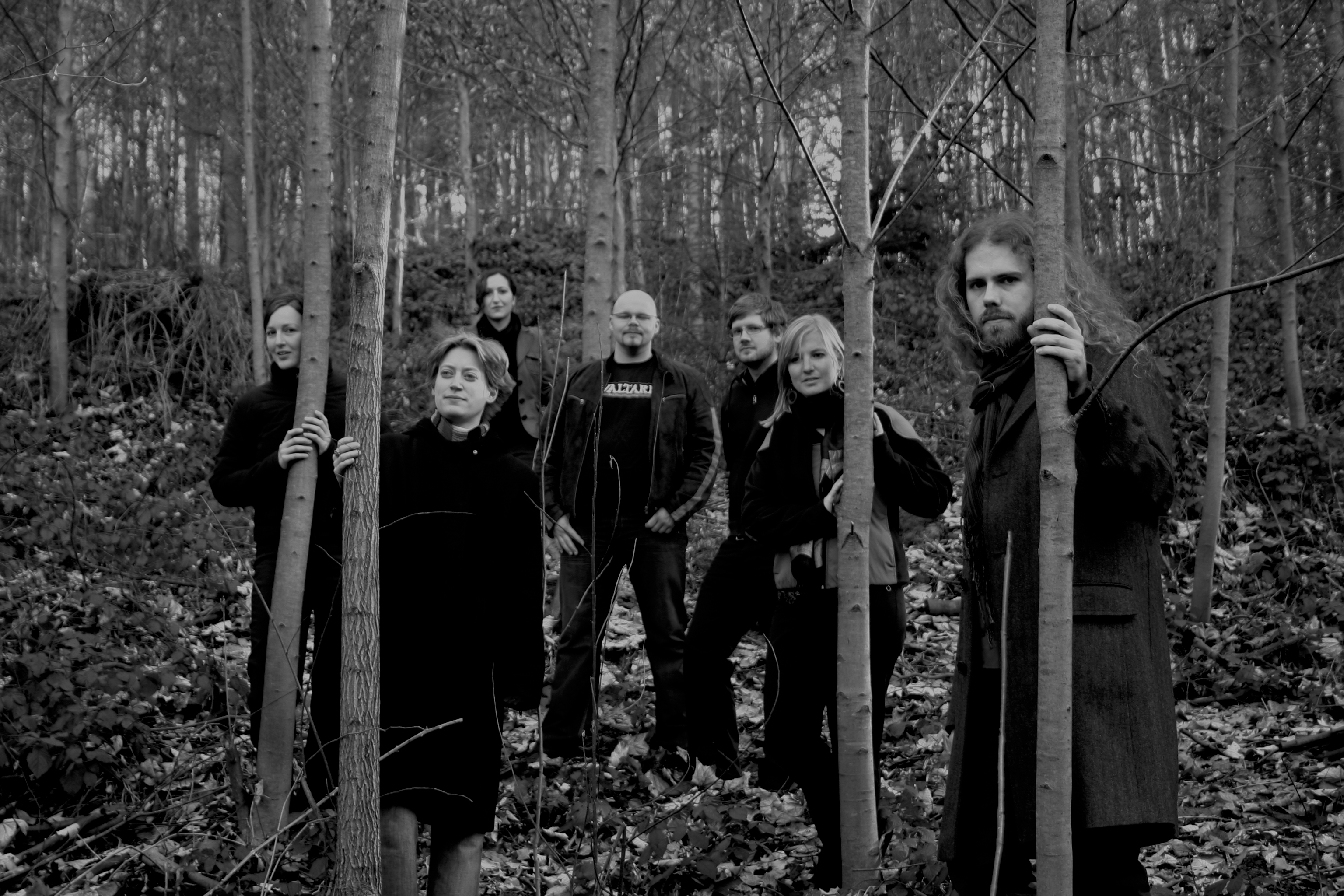
- Nucleus Torn band photo

Background information
- Origin: Switzerland
- Genres: Alternative metal Avant-garde metal Apocalyptic folk Experimental
- Years active: 1997 - 2015
- Label: Prophecy Productions
- Members: Fredy Schnyder; Patrick Schaad; Christoph Steiner; Anouk Hiedl; Rebecca Hagmann; Christine Schüpbach-Käser; Maria D'Alessandro; Anna Murphy
- Website: http://www.nucleustorn.ch

Nucleus Torn is an alternative metal/neofolk music band from Switzerland.

== History ==
Nucleus Torn was founded in 1997 as a one-man band by Fredy Schnyder, a versatile musician playing a variety of instruments including acoustic and electric guitars, the piano, recorders, the hammered dulcimer, the bouzouki, percussions, the oud, and others. Two years later, Schnyder was joined in 2004 the band's second EP Krähenkönigin was released by the Swiss producer Kunsthall, following a two-track demo release titled Submission (2003). In fact, Krähenkönigin had been recorded in 1998 by Fredy Schnyder alone, but it was not released until 2004 --- and even then the release was limited to 300 copies. Fredy Schnyder himself explains this delay in the production/release of Krähenkönigin by the fact that the material had originally been composed by him in "pieces for solo classical guitar" and without access to studio recording equipment. Stylistically, Krähenkönigin is a solo classical guitar album, with the tracks sharing the same general motif and almost comprising a single piece of music. The acoustic guitar themes would be further developed by the band in their later albums, but none of them any longer pertain to the "purely classical" genre as does Krähenkönigin. The three EPs (Krähenkönigin, Silver and Submission) were later remastered and re-released by the band (together with two previously unreleased tracks) on their compilation album Travellers (Prophecy Productions, 2010).

In 2006, Nucleus Torn released their first full album (CD) Nihil; this was also their first release with the German label Prophecy Productions. The official information on the album mentions that it was the result of "roughly three years of labour". This album deviates in its musical style from the band's previous releases: if the EPs can be attributed to the folk rock, neoclassical or neofolk genres, Nihil features a decidedly broader stylistic pattern, bringing the band into the scene of progressive rock and extreme metal. The band's founding member Fredy Schnyder explains this change in the playing style by the desire to blend different genres to convey more emotions:

With ‘Nihil’, we want to cover a broad array of emotions, and for that, we use different styles of music. Apart from that, we wish to prove that different styles of music (being defined as such by people) need not be mutually exclusive at all, if there is an adequate emotional framework for integrating various sounds.

QUOTE

Nihil is the first part of an album trilogy that was projected by the band. In 2008, the second part of the trilogy was released as a CD under the title Knell.

The third and final part of the trilogy entitled Andromeda Awaiting was released by the same label in November, 2010. The official description of this album is as follows:

With every new album, Nucleus Torn open new vistas of sound in the realm of avant-garde rock music. Fredy Schnyder, multi-instrumentalist and founder of this ambitious project from Switzerland, plays up to twenty electric and acoustic instruments and ventures radical musical innovations. Following "Nihil" (2006) and "Knell" (2008), "Andromeda Awaiting" provides the disillusioned, yet conciliatory completion of a conceptional trilogy.

As on the two precursors, Nucleus Torn are creating a new sonic realm on "Andromeda Awaiting." This acoustic and ethereal production blends elements of Progressive Rock with influences from Early Music (Middle Ages, Renaissance) and Impressionism as well as Folk and Jazz. Unique musical and compositional abilities are reflected in a pioneering synthesis of various stylistic elements often deemed incompatible. With "Andromeda Awaiting", Nucleus Torn release the most daring and ambitious album of their career to date --- they have reinvented themselves and their music for the third time in a row.

QUOTE

Andromeda Awaiting received some high ratings from a number of international musical magazines, including 5/5 points by METAL OBS, 9/10 points by METALGLORY.DE, 6.5/7 points by METALNEWS.DE, 8/10 points by IMPERIUMI.NET.

In December 2011, the band released a new album called Golden Age. Fredy Schnyder himself sees the new album as a "prequel to the trilogy" comprised by "Nihil", "Knell" and "Andromeda Awaiting".

== Discography ==
Year	Title	Format	Label	Catalog #
2001	Silver	EP	No label (self-released)	n/a
2003	Submission	Demo	No label (self-released)	n/a
2004 (original mix 2001)	Krähenkönigin	EP/10"	Kunsthall	n/a
2006	Nihil	CD	Prophecy Productions	PRO 086
2008	Knell	CD	Prophecy Productions	PRO 093
2010	Travellers	CD (Compilation)	Prophecy Productions	PRO 108
2010	Andromeda Awaiting	CD (A5 digipack)	Prophecy Productions	PRO 107
2010	Whom the Moon a Nightsong Sings	VA compilation (Disc 2)	Prophecy Productions	AB 029
2011	Golden Age	CD (A5 digipack)	Prophecy Productions	PRO 110
2014	Street Lights Fail	CD	Prophecy Productions	PRO 156
2015	Neon Light Eternal	CD	Prophecy Productions	PRO 160
2015	Blowing Up The Entire World: Explosions 1997-2015	DVD x3 (Compilation)	Prophecy Productions	PRO 180

For further information on the history of the releases, see the liner notes and credits to Travellers on the band's official web page.
