= Woodsmoke =

Studio album by Nest
- Released: January 20, 2003
- Recorded: 2002
- Genre: Neofolk, ambient
- Length: 44:55
- Language: Finnish
- Label: Corvus Records

Nest chronology
Hidden Stream (2001)	Woodsmoke (2003)	Agalloch / Nest (2004)

Woodsmoke - Special Edition

Woodsmoke is the first studio album by Finnish neofolk / ambient band Nest. It was released on January 20, 2003 through Corvus Records.

== Track listing ==
1. "The Silvershade Lynx" – 6:37
2. "Call of the Wild" – 6:45
3. "By the Healing Waters" – 4:38
4. "Otterheart" – 4:33
5. "Summer Storm" – 4:10
6. "Calmly Passing Monument" – 4:48
7. "Renewal" – 4:14
8. "Courting" – 4:23
9. "A Winternight Visage" – 4:47

The special edition, limited to 99 copies, was released in a luxury box and contains an additional poster.

== Credits ==
- Aslak Tolonen – kantele, vocals
- Timo Saxell – bass, vocals
