= Väre (building) =

Coordinates: 60°11′7.01″N 24°49′29.86″E

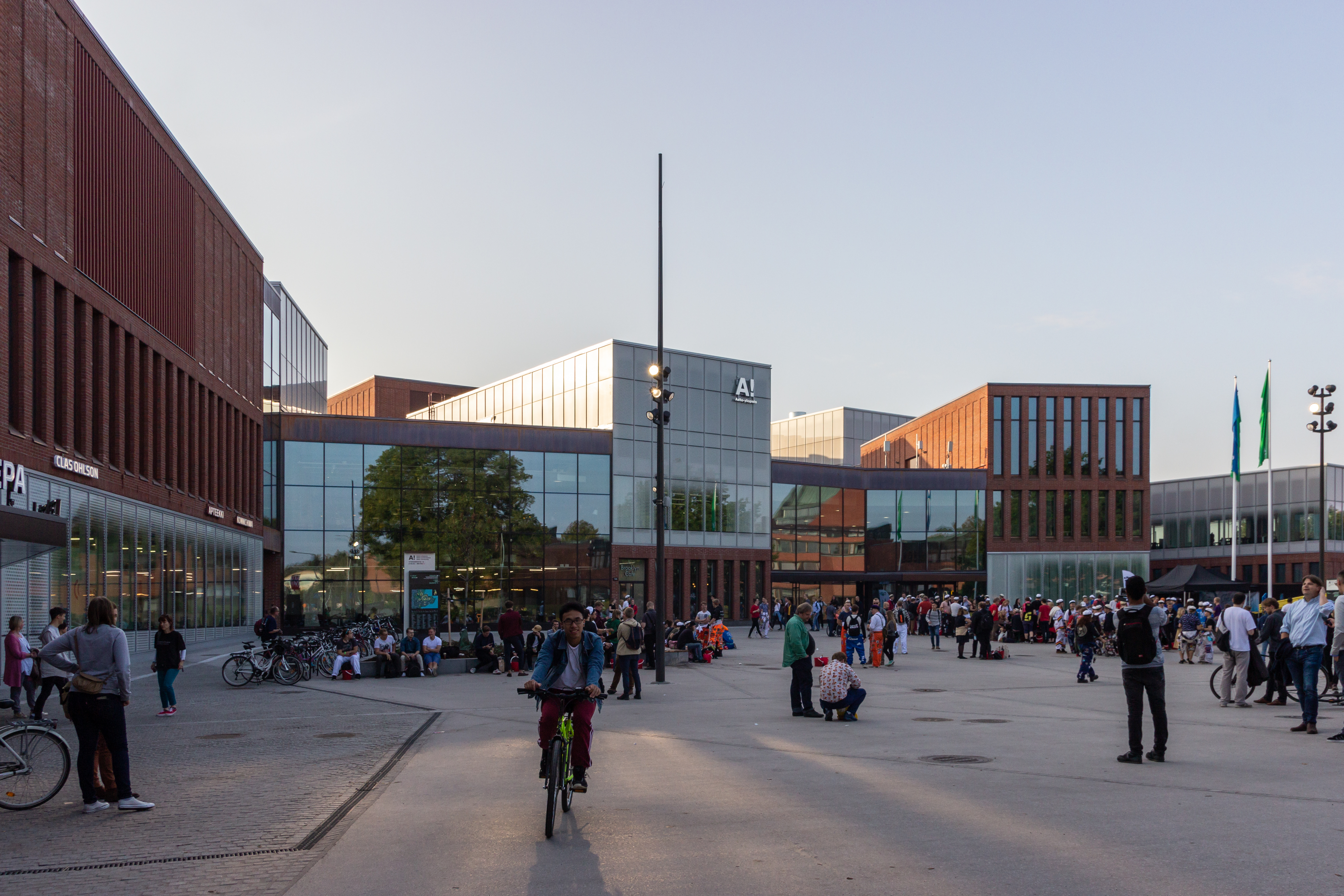
The entrance to the Väre building on the side of the Korkeakouluaukio square soon after the building's opening in September 2018.

Väre is a building of the Aalto University in Otaniemi, Espoo, Finland. The main user of the building is the Aalto University School of Arts, Design and Architecture, in addition to which the metro centre on the ground floor contains about 6000 square metres of commercial space such as two grocery stores, special stores and many restaurants and cafés.

The building has a connection to the Aalto University metro station. In the immediate vicinity, on the other side of the Korkeakouluaukio square, are the Aalto University Undergraduate Center and the Aalto University Library. There is a stop for the Helsinki light rail line 15 on the Korkeakouluaukio square.

A design contest was held for the building, which was won by the entry by Verstas Arkkitehdit in 2013. Designers included Jussi Palva, Väinö Nikkilä, Riina Palva, Ilkka Salminen and Mikko Rossi.

Construction started in December 2015. The building was completed in summer 2018 and was opened to the public in September 2018. The main building of the Aalto University School of Business located in the same block was taken into use in February 2019 when the rest of the facilities of the business school moved from Töölö, Helsinki to the new building in Otaniemi.

In order to strengthen stereotypes, the railings and stairs at the business school part make playful use of gold-coloured paint while the part for the school of arts, design and architecture make use of rusted steel. There is a café at the bottom floor selling sparkling wine. On the bottom floor of the schgool of arts, design and architecture is a vegetarian restaurant.

== Criticism ==
The building has received criticism from its users for lack of necessary space such as storage space, excessive wasted space, nonexistent privacy and insufficient air conditioning. Some students view the spaces as entirely unsuitable for studying arts.

According to Jussi Palva of Verstas Arkkitehdit the space program for the architecture competition and the winning plan for left enough space for all activities, but the Sipilä cabinet which was formed in 2015 ordered savings for the university which led to a cut-down of space. The university had to make considerable savings of its space expenses in order to maintain its most important activities including teaching and research. This meant that the space program for the Väre building was contracted significantly and storage spaces for student work were cut down.

== Recognition ==
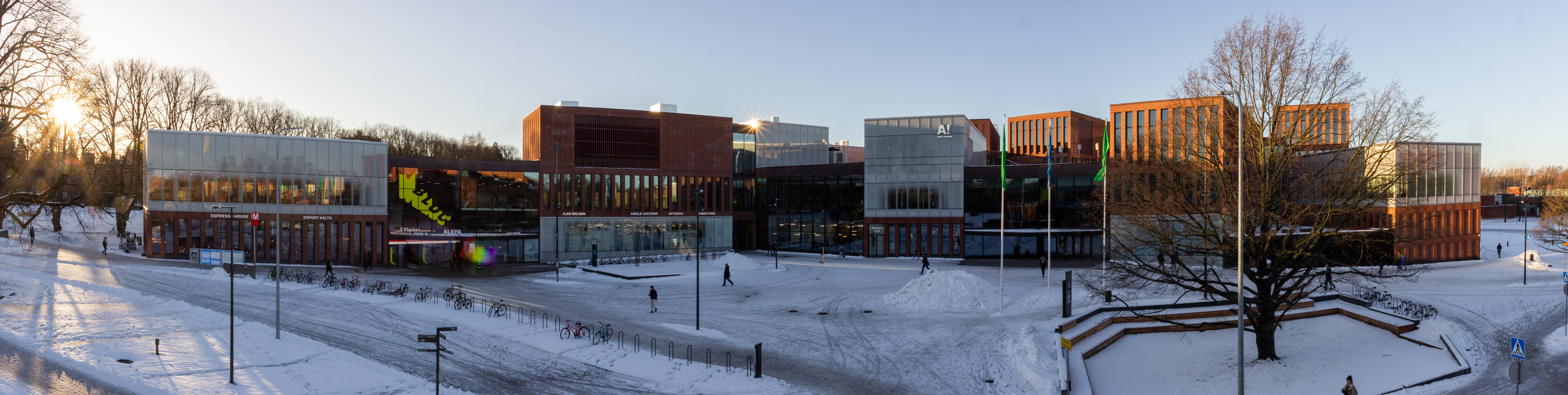
The Väre building and the A-Bloc shopping centre in January 2019.

The new campus building for the Aalto University (Väre, the main building of the business school and the A-Bloc shopping centre) has received recognition for its controlled architecture, fitting in to the Otaniemi cityscape and modifiability of the building.

The building has received the following awards, award nominations and recognition:

- Hurraa! prize of the Espoo board of construction for successful implementation in 2018 (Väre, the main building of the business school and the shopping centre A-Bloc).
- One of the Finnish nominees for the European Union Mies van der Rohe modern architecture prize in 2019.
- Nomination at the World Architecture Festival in Amsterdam, the Netherlands in 2019.
- Nomination for Finlandia Prize for Architecture in 2020.
- Architecture MasterPrize award in 2020.

== Gallery ==
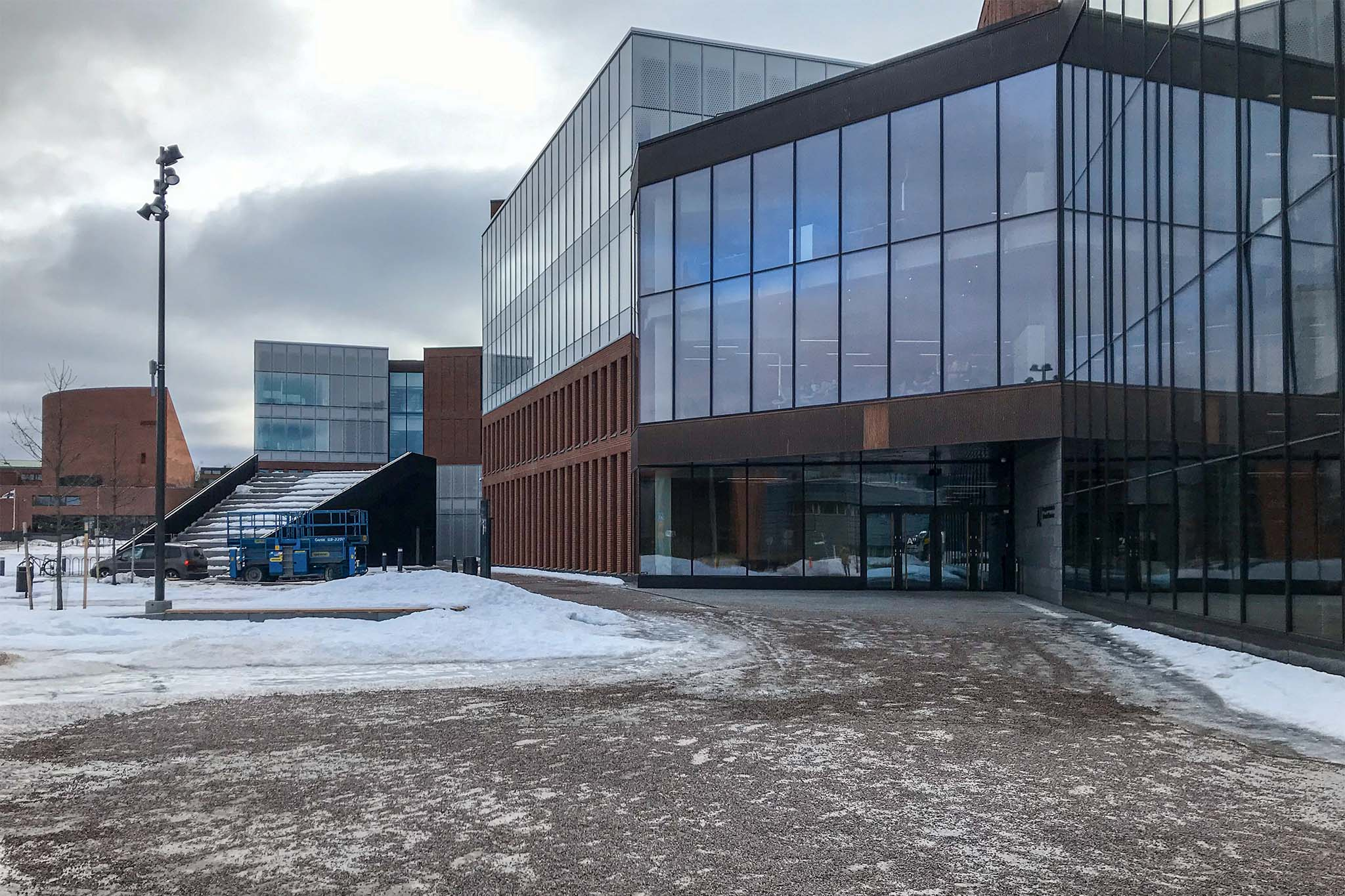
Entrance to the Aalto University Business School in February 2019

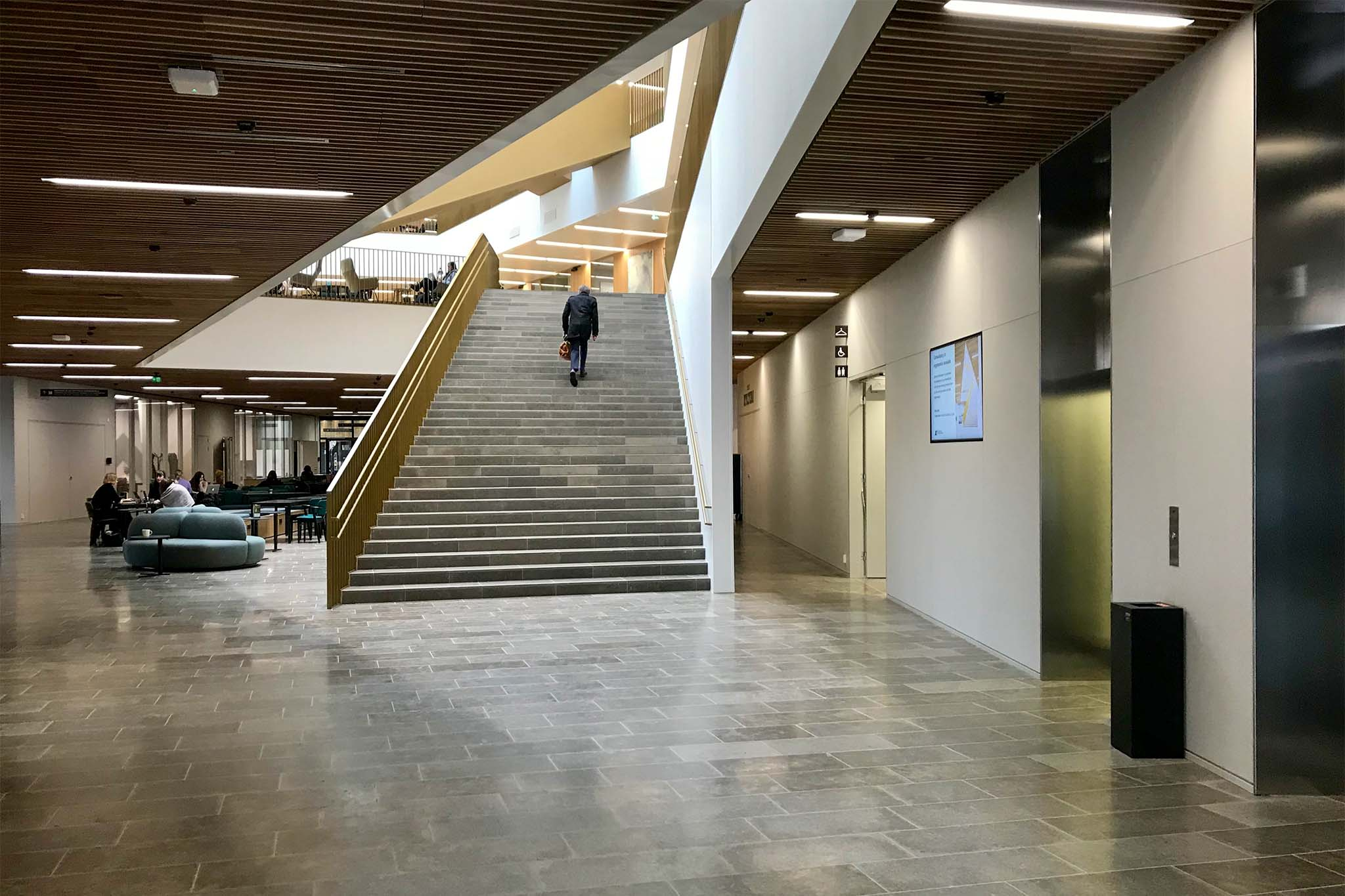
The lobby of the Aalto University Business School

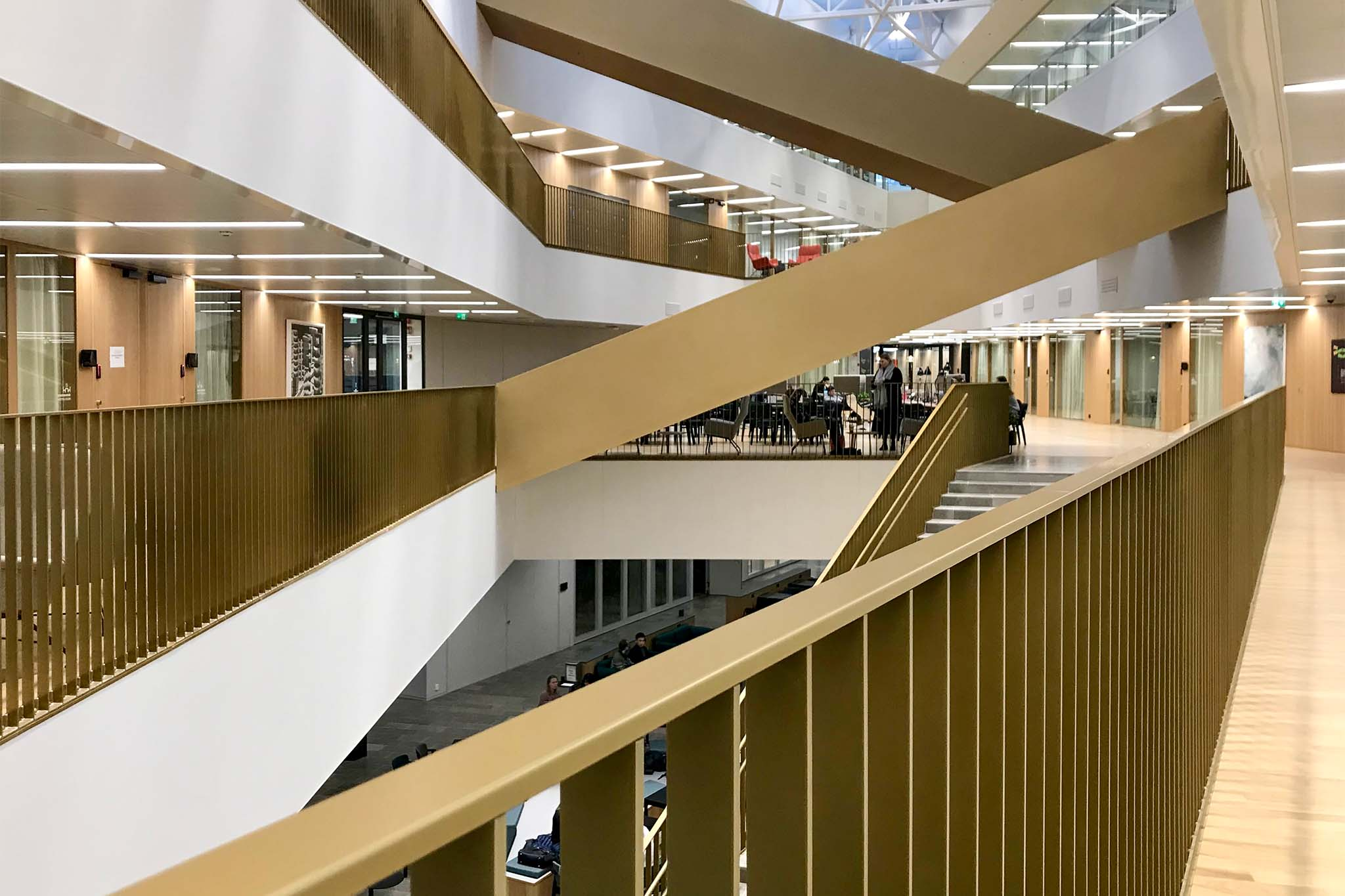
Premises of the Aalto University Business School

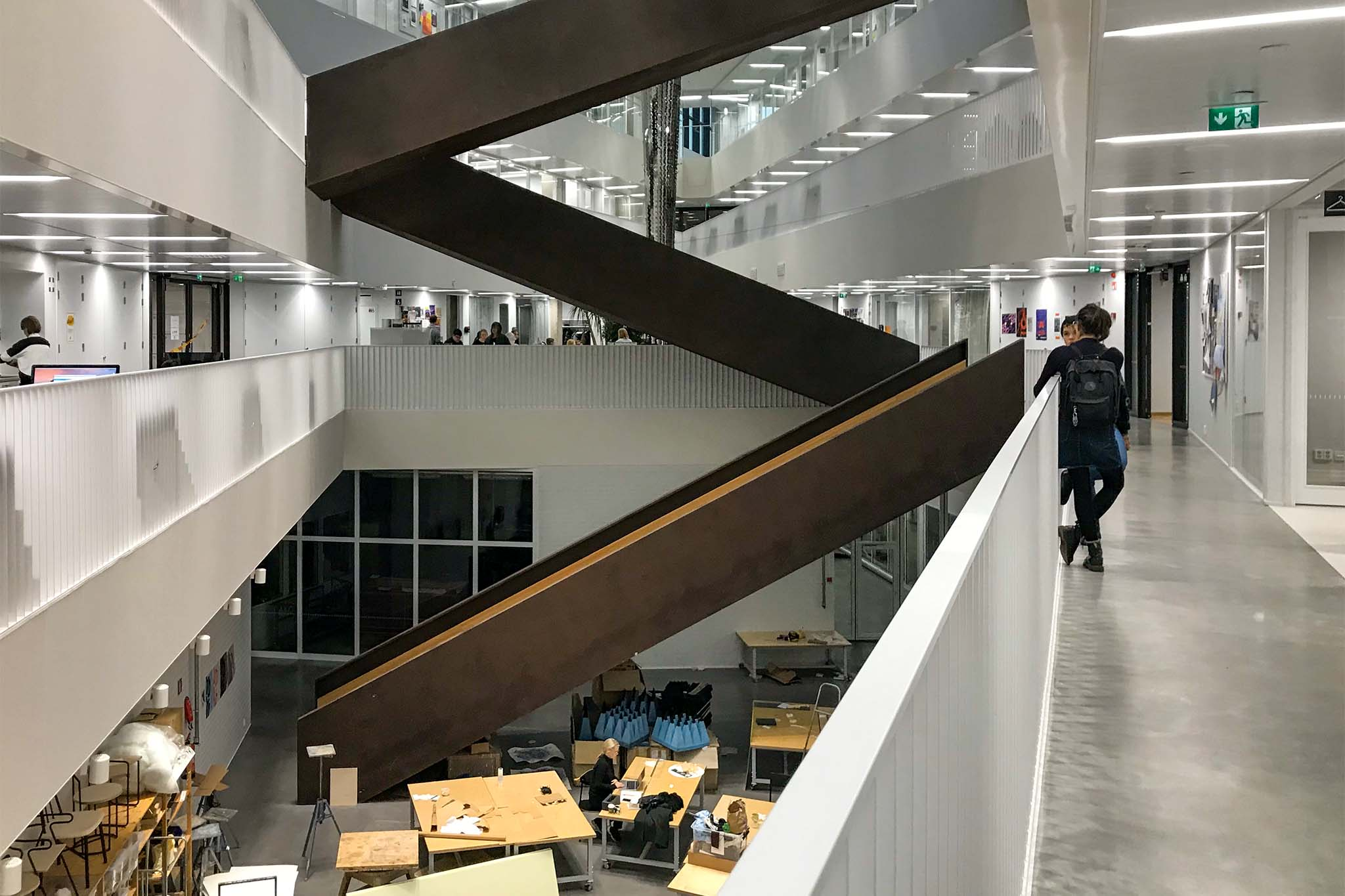
Premises of the Aalto University School of Arts, Design and Architecture

== See also ==
- Aalto University Undergraduate Center
- Dipoli
