= Havnatt =

Norwegian band

- Origin: Oslo, Norway
- Genres: Neofolk
- Years active: 2006–present
- Label: Secret Quarters
- Members: Cecilie Langlie; Tom Simonsen
- Website: havnatt.com

Havnatt is a neofolk musical duo hailing from Oslo, Norway. The members, Cecilie Langlie and Tom Simonsen, are members of a number of other Oslo bands including Skumring, Vagrant God and Omit. They formed Havnatt in the spring of 2006 when they were commissioned by the Skagestad family to turn three poems by the late Norwegian author Tormod Skagestad into music. The three poems were Myrulla, Havnatt and Prammen from the collection of poems entitled Havdøgn.

In the autumn of 2009, Cecilie and Tom were asked by Prophecy Productions to write an exclusive piece of music for a compilation album entitled Whom The Moon A Nightsong Sings. The new Havnatt track included in that release was named Dagen og natta. This led to Cecilie and Tom writing more Havnatt material. Whom The Moon A Nightsong Sings was released on October 29, 2010.

On February 15, 2012 Havnatt released their Havdøgn EP on the Secret Quarters label. This release contains completely remixed and remastered versions of the tracks Myrulla, Havnatt and Prammen. In addition, the release also contains two completely new tracks that gave a hint of the future direction of Havnatt. The EP received favorable reviews, described as "very peaceful, relaxed, chilling and matches the twilight Norwegian landscapes", "calm, relaxing and easily accessible music", Cecilie's voice described as "just beautiful, angelic and with of eerie feel" and Tom's guitar work as "strongly based on melodious arpeggios and leads".

Shortly after the release of Havdøgn, the duo began to work on a full-length album entitled Etterlatte, after Tormod Skagestad's poem with the same name. The first single from this album, Var je solblesten, was released by Secret Quarters as a digital distribution only release on September 25, 2012. The album has received favorable reviews.

The Etterlatte album was released worldwide on August 15, 2013.

== Discography ==
=== Albums ===
- Etterlatte (Secret Quarters) 15 August 2013
- Heimferd (Secret Quarters) 15 November 2016

=== EPs ===
- Havdøgn (Secret Quarters) 15 February 2012

=== Singles ===
- Dagen og natta (Prophecy) 29 October 2010 (on Whom The Moon A Nightsong Sings)
- Var je solblesten (Secret Quarters) 25 September 2012
- Søvn i september (Secret Quarters) 1 September 2014
