= Aikaintaite =

Studio album by Syven
- Released: December 6, 2011
- Genre: Ambient, neofolk, metal
- Length: 64:55
- Language: Finnish
- Label: Vendlus Records

Syven chronology
Aikaintaite (2011)	Corpus Christi (2012)

Aikaintaite is the début full-length album by the Finnish ambient, neofolk, and metal band Syven. It was released on December 6, 2011 through Vendlus Records.

== Concept ==
The album's concept, greatly inspired by shamanism and animism, is to imagine the soundscapes of the Finnish forests, lakes and rivers, as the land was emerging from the last glacial period. Aikaintaite's main theme is the interplay between the passages of time, short and long, their effects and their changing appearances when looked from other time frames. The album's Finnish title means the passing or folding of time. The album's cover art, created by the band's songwriter and multi-instrumentalist Aslak Tolonen, consists of reproductions of two ink paintings, Kotkan Sarvet (Eagle's Horns) and Hillerin Kallo (European Polecat's Skull). The latter one, used on the front cover, represents how drastically time affects the living things. The songs are sung by a character, who is able to travel between different worlds and dimensions, bringing their understanding to the present.

== Music ==
Stylistically, Aikantaite is a fusion of various styles, including ambient, acoustic, neofolk and metal, with the resulting mixture often described as shamanistic. The album's sound is centered on kanteles that Tolonen had made himself. Two types of this instrument were used, a 15-string acoustic and a 12-string electric, the sound of which is often confused with that of an electric guitar. Lapland drums, sleigh bells and rainsticks were also utilized, as well as various electronic instruments. The mood of the album is heavy, dark and primordial; greatly enhancing the overall atmosphere are the vocals of Andy Koski-Semmens, who uses various chants, grunts and whispers in addition to his semi-operatic baritone singing voice.

== Track listing ==
All tracks are written by Aslak Tolonen

No.	Title	Translation	Length
1.	"Syvyys"	Depth	6:55
2.	"Jäljet"	Tracks	19:22
3.	"Ne, jotka selviävät talvestamme"	Those Who Survive Our Winter	18:46
4.	"Jäänkätkemä"	Hidden by Ice	7:45
5.	"Tuulenvire"	Rising Wind's Tune	12:07
Total length:			64:55

== Credits ==
- Aslak Tolonen – all instruments
- Andy Koski-Semmens – vocals
