= Where at Night the Wood Grouse Plays =

Studio album by Empyrium
- Released: 12 July 1999
- Genre: Neofolk
- Length: 32:27
- Label: Prophecy

Empyrium chronology
Songs of Moors and Misty Fields (1997)	Where at Night the Wood Grouse Plays (1999)	Weiland (2002)

Where at Night the Wood Grouse Plays (1999) is the third album by the German symphonic folk/doom metal band Empyrium.

== Track listing ==
Tracks 2, 5, 6 and 7 are instrumentals

No.	Title	Length
1.	"Where at Night the Wood Grouse Plays"	05:34
2.	"Dying Brokenhearted"	05:39
3.	"The Shepherd and the Maiden Ghost"	03:26
4.	"The Sad Song of the Wind"	02:56
5.	"Wehmut"	03:04
6.	"A Pastoral Theme"	01:59
7.	"Abendrot"	02:10
8.	"Many Moons Ago"	04:25
9.	"When Shadows Grow Longer"	03:14
Total length:		32:27

- The song "When Shadows Grow Longer" is a new version of the same song from the 1997 Songs of Moors and Misty Fields album.

== Personnel ==
- Ulf Theodor Schwadorf – vocals, guitars (acoustic), bass, drums
- Nadine Mölter – flute

Additional personnel

- Thomas Helm – vocals
