= Whom the Moon a Nightsong Sings =

Compilation album by Various Artists
- Released: October 29, 2010
- Recorded: Various
- Genre: Neofolk
- Length: 104:23
- Label: Prophecy
- Producer: Various

Professional ratings
Review scores
Source	Rating
About.com	2.5/5 stars
Allmusic	4/5 stars
Chronicles of Chaos	8.5/10 stars

Whom the Moon a Nightsong Sings is a compilation album by various neofolk and metal artists. It was released through Prophecy Productions on October 29, 2010. Artists featured on the compilation album include Ulver, Nest, Syven, Les Discrets, Neun Welten, Nucleus Torn, Orplid, Tenhi, and Havnatt.

== Track listing ==
Disc 1
No.	Title	Artist	Length
1.	"Hoestmelankoli"	Vàli	1:29
2.	"The Days Before the Fall"	Empyrium	5:38
3.	"Summer Storm" (Acoustic version)	Nest	5:22
4.	"Ich Würd es Hören"	Nebelung	4:39
5.	"Viima"	October Falls	3:51
6.	"A Year of Silence"	Ainulindalë	4:49
7.	"5, Montée Des Épies"	Les Discrets	1:48
8.	"Après L'Ombre"	Les Discrets	4:30
9.	"Solstice"	Musk Ox	4:47
10.	"Dagen Og Natta"	Havnatt	6:59
11.	"Dem Wind Geboren"	Dornenreich	4:31
12.	"Haredans I Fjellheimen"	Vàli	1:10
Total length:			49:33

Disc 2
No.	Title	Artist	Length
1.	"Upon the Wind its Wings Beat Sorrow into the Stars"	Nhor	3:50
2.	"Synen"	Ulver	5:05
3.	"Pan"	Neun Welten	8:33
4.	"Kausienranta"	Tenhi	5:56
5.	"Ocaso" (Acoustic version)	Bauda	3:48
6.	"Stille" (Demo)	Orplid	4:34
7.	"Krähenkönigin III"	Nucleus Torn	5:24
8.	"Språnget Ur Ursprunget"	Lönndom	3:30
9.	"How Fare the Gods?"	Syven	14:10
Total length:			54:50
