= Seven Wonders of Jena =

Evidence that somebody had been to Jena

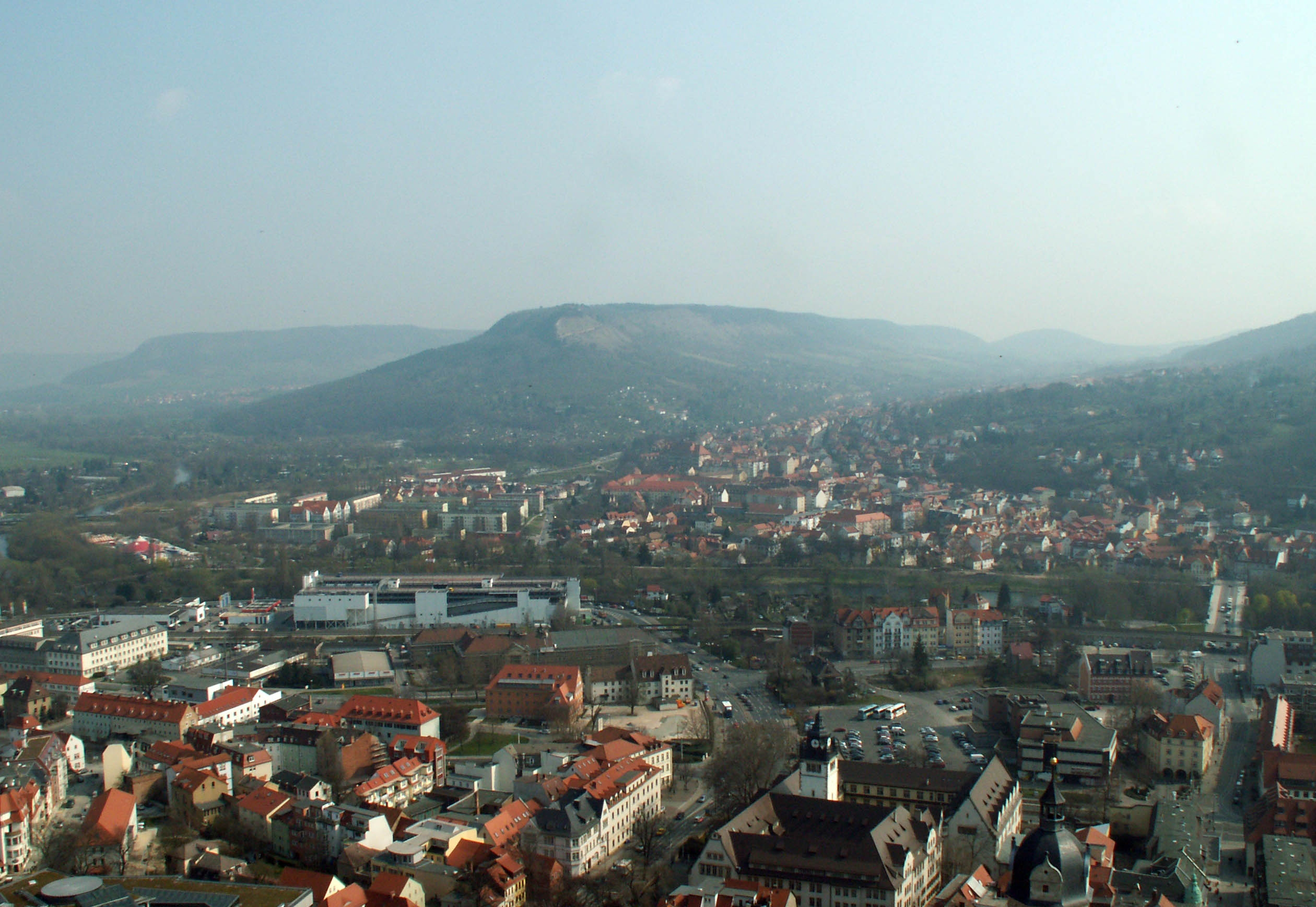
The Jenzig mountain

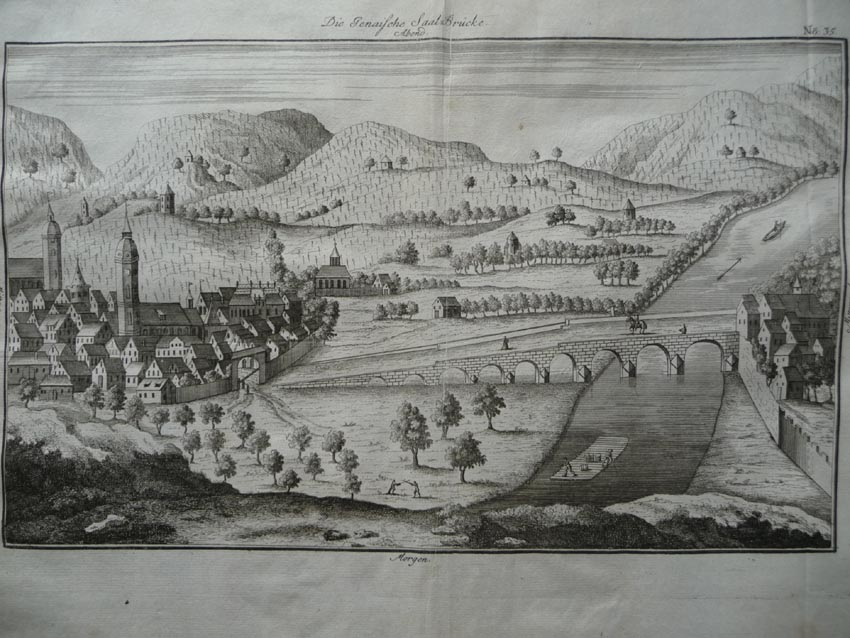
Camsdorf Bridge in the year 1735

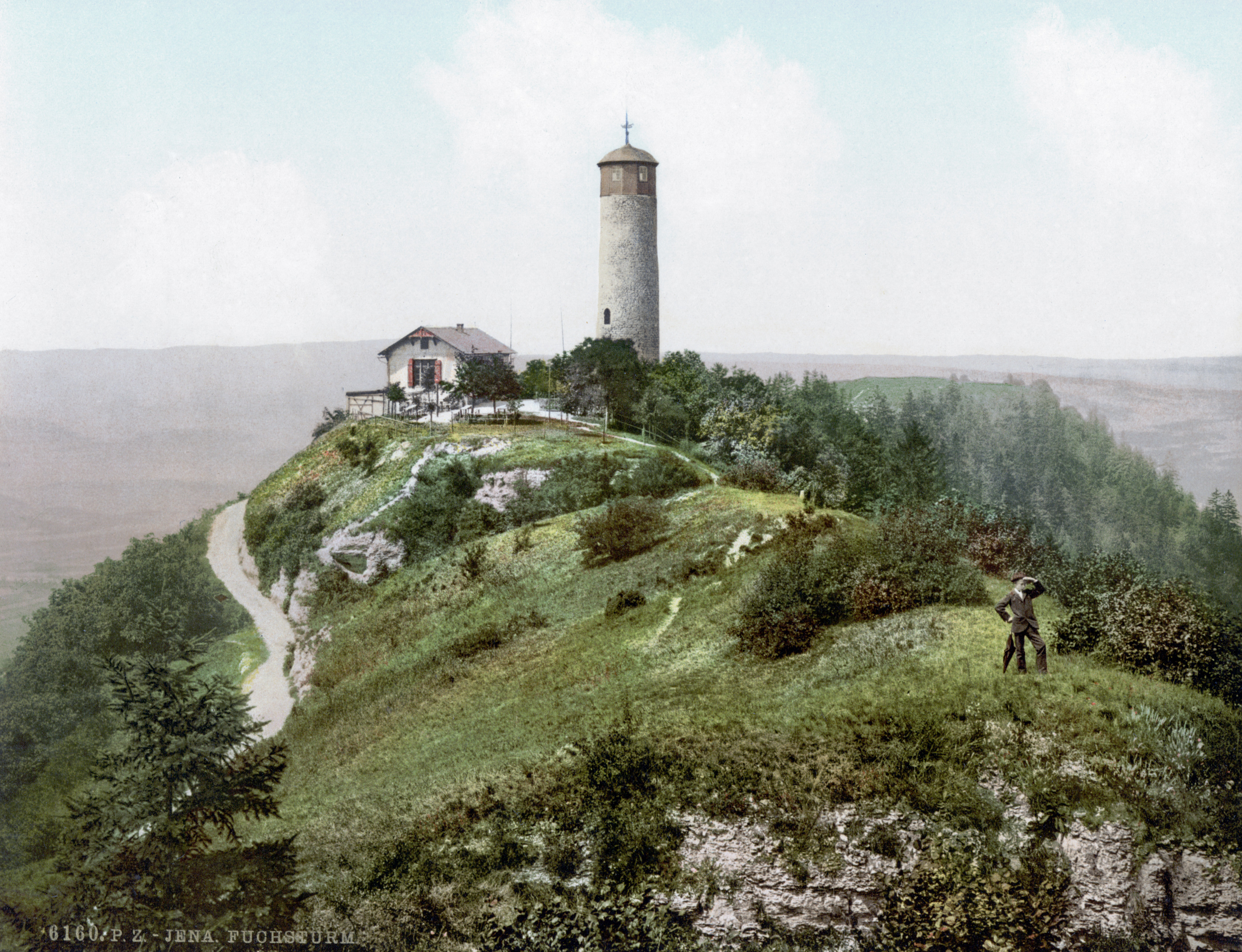
The Fox Tower in 1900

The Seven Wonders of Jena (Latin: septem miracula Jenae) are seven attractions associated historically with the Thuringian university town Jena.

== History ==
In 1558 the University of Jena was founded, soon to become one of the most famous places of study in Germany. Students from across Europe came to Jena to attend the university. Upon graduation, alumni were aware of seven curiosities specific to the city of Jena and its immediate vicinity. This list of curiosities was secret and meant to be taken as evidence of a person's actual presence in Jena. A contemporary author writing in Latin verse lists the seven wonders as: "Ara, caput, draco, mons, pons, vulpecula turris, Weigeliana domus, septem miracula Jenae." The uninitiated could not guess the meaning of this saying. By this unusual means, the university sought to protect itself against imposters and fraudsters who might damage the reputation of the university.

Five of the "seven wonders" described below still exist today.

== Ara - the passage under the altar of the city church ==
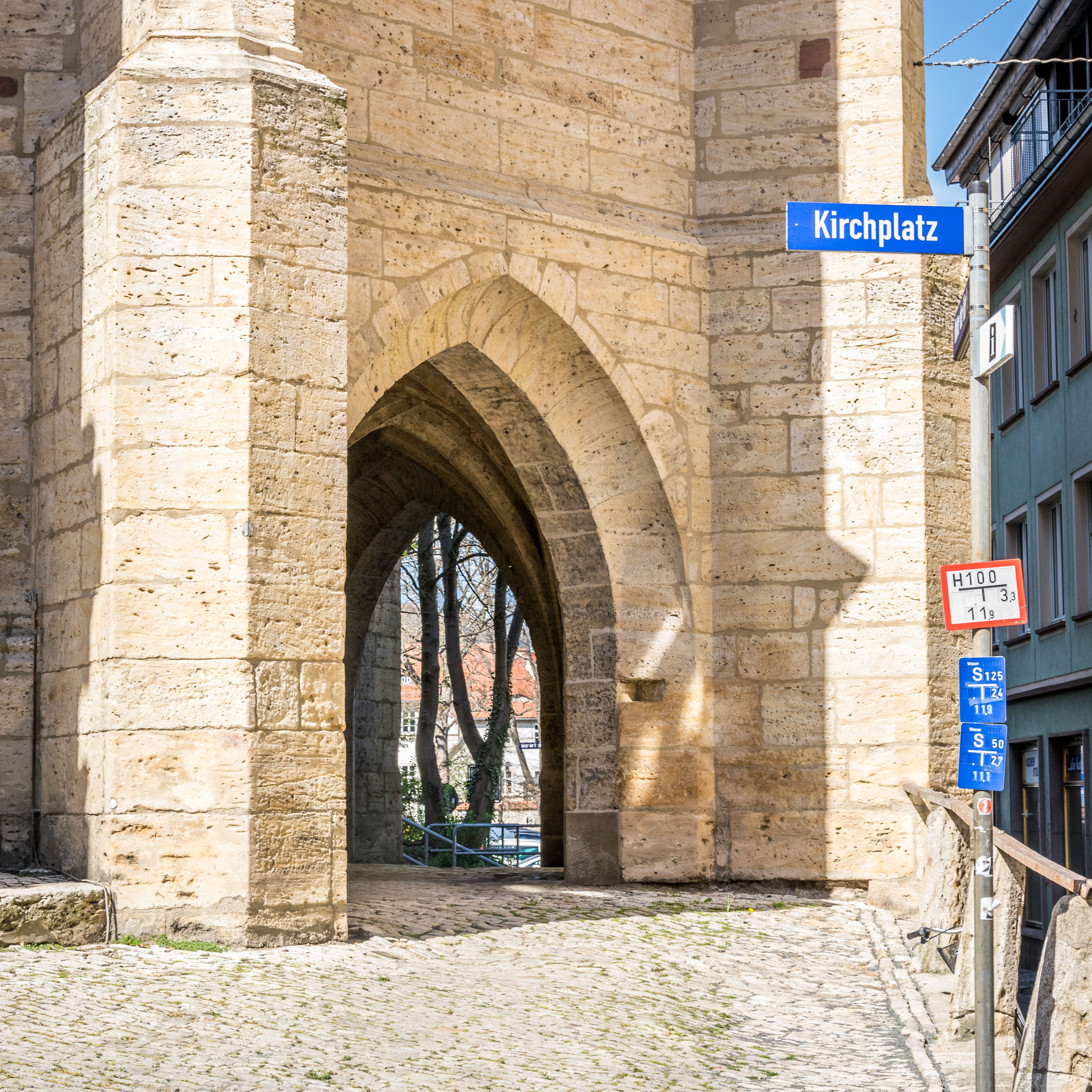
The passageway under the chancel of the city church of St. Michael.

One of the seven wonders is Ara, a vaulted passage under the altar of the parish church, which offered the only access to the Cistercian monastery located behind this church at the time of its founding in 1301. The passage has a height of 3.5 meters and a width of 3 meters. This architectural curiosity in church building is very rare.

== Caput - the Schnapphans figure at the town hall ==
"Schnapphans" figure on the city hall tower

Schnapphans is a figure of a head on the tower of town hall, which "snaps" on the hour after a golden ball on a bar that a pilgrim keeps standing on a pedestal to the left of the clock. The ball represents a klöße (a type of dumpling characteristic of Thuringia). Legend has it that Jena will fall when Hans is able to grab it. To the right of the clock is an angel holding a bell in his hands in front of his body. This figure moves to a quarter-hour strike. The original Schnapphans can be seen today in the Stadtmuseum; the town hall clock now features a copy. From Schnapphans am Rathaus is to see only the very lean (hungry) head. Caput is the Latin word for the head.

== Draco - the seven-headed dragon ==
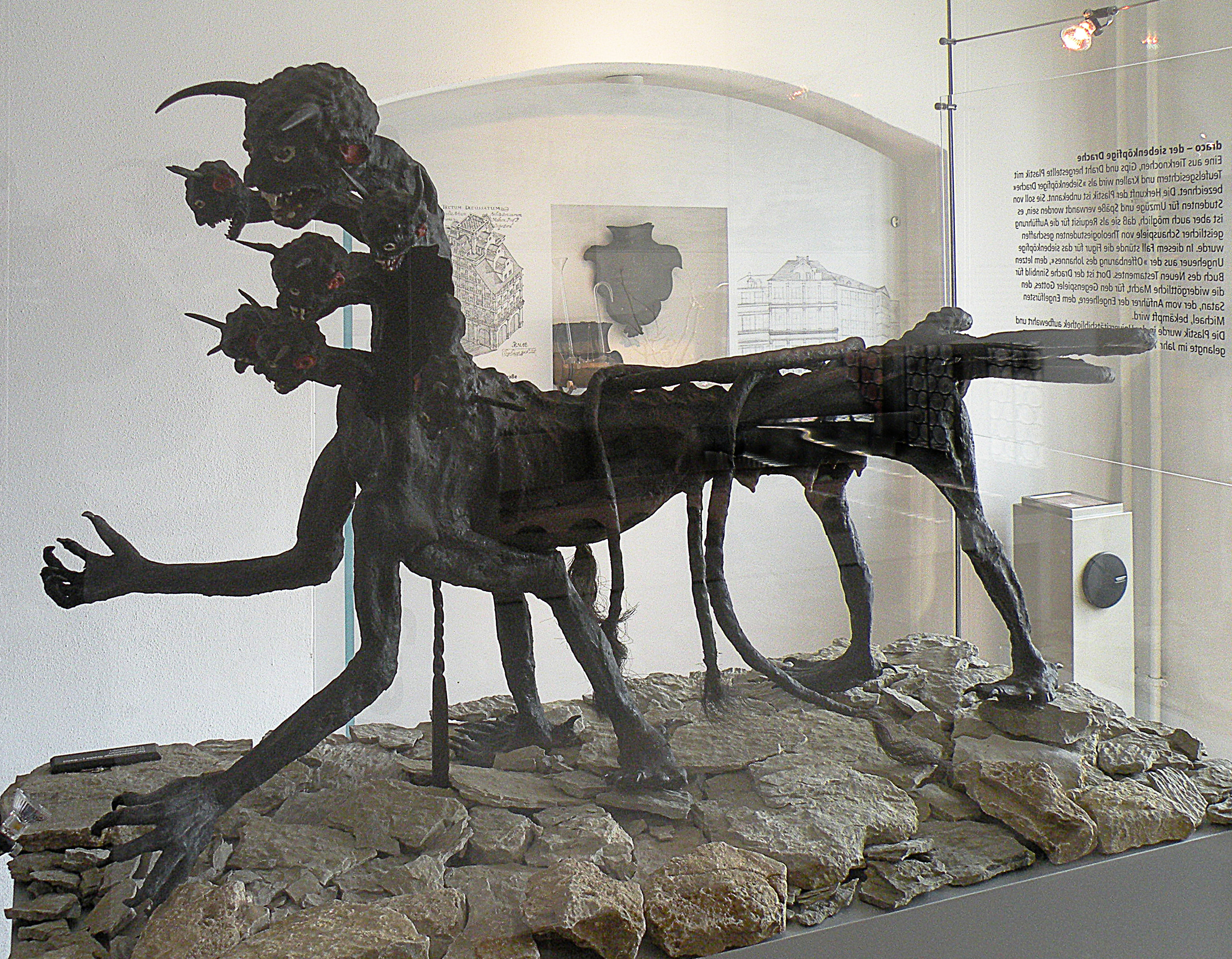
Draco, the seven-headed dragon

A sculpture of a dragon (German Drache, Latin Draco) with seven heads, four legs, two arms and four tails was likely made for fun by students in Jena during the early 17th century. It is made from animal bones, wire and paper mache. Draco can presently be seen in the city museum in Jena.

== Mons - the Jenzig mountain ==
The mountain (German Berg, Latin Mons) refers to the most impressive mountain in the vicinity of Jena, the Jenzig, a 385-meter-high (1,263 ft) limestone mountain with a prominent bald spot, the so-called Jenzignase ("Jenzig nose").

== Pons - the old Camsdorf Bridge ==
The old Camsdorf Bridge (lat. Pons) was a stone arch bridge with 9 arches built around 1480 and rebuilt in 1912. At the time of its construction, the rebuilt bridge was one of the largest bridges in Germany and even featured a chapel. The newly rebuilt bridge was blown up by German soldiers in 1945, an act which was pointless as the Americans had already crossed the Saale in another place. In 1946, during the time of the Soviet occupation zone, the bridge was rebuilt with the help of the Soviet occupiers and therefore bore the name "Bridge of German-Soviet Friendship". It was the first structure in Jena which to be rebuilt after the war. The new Camsdorf bridge had to be renovated in 2005.

Some Jena citizens have drafted plans to erect a small chapel on the bridge, featuring an angel designed by a Munich artist based on the coat of arms of Jena. However, there is only one photo of this striking work of art.

== Vulpecula Turris - The Fox Tower ==
The Fox Tower (German Fuchsturm, Latin Vulpecula Turris) is an old castle keep on the mountain, which formerly belonged to the castle Kirchberg.

== Weigeliana Domus - the Weigel House ==
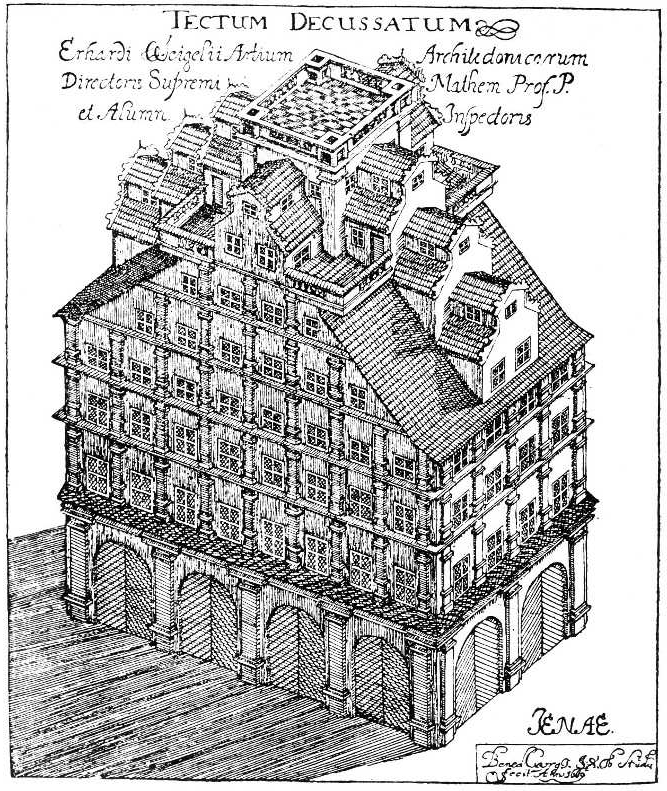
The Weigel House in a schematic diagram by Benedictus Georgi (1669)

The final wonder of Jena was the Weigel House (German Weigelsche Haus, Latin Weigeliana Domus), demolished in 1898 in order to widen a road. The house stood beside the city church and owed its fame to its owner, the mathematics professor Erhard Weigel, in the 17th century. Weigel had installed many technical innovations throughout the house, including a wine pipe from the cellar, a lift based on the principle of the pulley, and long tubes through the house, protruding through the roof and permitting stargazing even during the day. At the time, the Weigel House was a well-known sight far beyond the city limits. A saying attributed to contemporary students was "he who didn't see Weigel's house wasn't in Jena."

== Links ==
- The Seven Wonders of Jena at the website of the City of Jena
- Notscheine der Fuchsturmgemeinde Notgeld (Emergency banknotes) from the town of Jena illustrating the Fox Tower Hymn https://webgerman.com/Notgeld/Directory/J/Fuchsturm1.htm
