= A Wintersunset... =

Studio album by Empyrium
- Released: July 15, 1996
- Recorded: R+A Studio/Münnerstadt
- Genres: Symphonic metal, folk metal, doom metal, black metal
- Length: 48:53
- Label: Prophecy
- Producer: Empyrium

Empyrium chronology
A Wintersunset... (1996)	Songs of Moors and Misty Fields (1997)

A Wintersunset... is the first album by the German band Empyrium.

== Track listing ==
No.	Title	Length
1.	"Moonromanticism"	2:00
2.	"Under Dreamskies"	10:09
3.	"The Franconian Woods in Winter's Silence"	10:55
4.	"The Yearning"	8:41
5.	"Autumn Grey Views"	3:55
6.	"Ordain'd to Thee"	11:14
7.	"A Gentle Grieving Farewell Kiss"	1:59
Total length:		48:53

== Personnel ==
- Ulf Theodor Schwadorf - all strings, vocals, percussions
- Andreas Bach - synthesizer

=== Additional personnel ===
- Nadine Mötler - flute
- Andreas Beck - engineering
- Christophe Szpajdel - logo
- R. Reichert - paintings
- Stefan Other - photography (band)
