= Sonne Hagal =

Sonne Hagal is a German experimental and neofolk group.

== History ==
The band originates from Rathenow in Brandenburg where the core line-up was formed in 1992. The members were part of the local punk rock and experimental pop music scene. The early records from the 1990s were electronic music. A breakthrough came with the 10" album Sinnreger from 2000, where the band had adopted conventions from the dark wave and neofolk genres. The album includes the German folk song "Herbstlied", a poem by the expressionist poet Else Lasker-Schüler, and a track based on an agitation song by Rosa Luxemburg. The following releases deepened the band's interest in runes, Eddic poetry and nature lyricism, and saw collaborations with Andreas Ritter of Forseti and Kim Larsen of Of the Wand & the Moon. On the album Sonne Hagal vs. Polarzirkel the band collaborated with the electronic sound artists Polarzirkel and Nerthus to create atonal music with ritualistic elements. On the 2005 single "Dygel" they collaborated with Ian Read and Matt Howden.

The members of the band have chosen to be anonymous. The name was chosen to reflect the thematic interest in runes and Northern European mysticism. Sonne is German for sun and hagal is one of the runes. According to the singer of the band, modern people can learn a lot from ancient religion and philosophy. He has stressed the advantages of polytheism, harmony with the laws of nature, the ability to find holiness in many places, the view of humans as part of nature, and how the runes can teach people about nondualism.

== Discography ==
=== Albums and EPs ===
Year	Title	Format, Special Notes
2000	Sinnreger	10"
2001	Starkadr	7"
2001	Sinister Practices In Bright Sunshine	LP
2002	Helfahrt	CD / LP
2002	Sonne Hagal vs. Polarzirkel	12"
2004	Tarja	7"
2005	Dygel	7"
2005	Nidar	Mini-CD / 10"
2008	Jordansfrost	CD / LP
2010	Läuthner 2a	7"
2014	Ockerwasser	CD / LP

=== Compilations ===
Year	Title	Format, Special Notes
2002	Audacia Imperat!	CD
2002	Tempus Arborum	CD
2003	Audacia Imperat	2xCD
2003	Eisiges Licht	CD
2003	The Bells Shall Sound Forever	CD
2004	Ny Regret Du Passè, Ny Peur De L'Avenir...	MP3
2005	Eichendorff - Liedersammlung	CD
2005	Eisiges Licht 2	CD
2005	Looking For Europe	4xCD
2006	the impossibility of silence (black sun production)	CD+CD-R ltd.
2006	Indaco ep (Albireon/ Ian Read)	CD
2006	FORSETI lebt!	CD
