= Camsdorf Bridge =

Bridge in Jena, Thuringia, Germany

Coordinates: 50.9285°N 11.5958°E

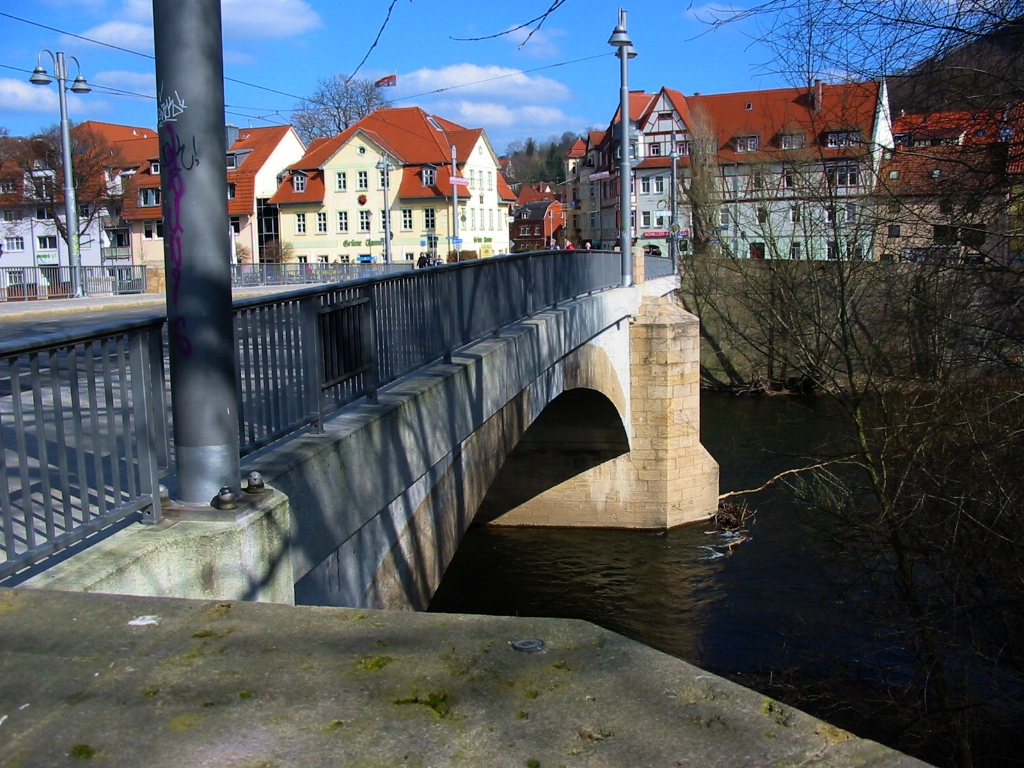
Modern Camsdorf Bridge following renovations

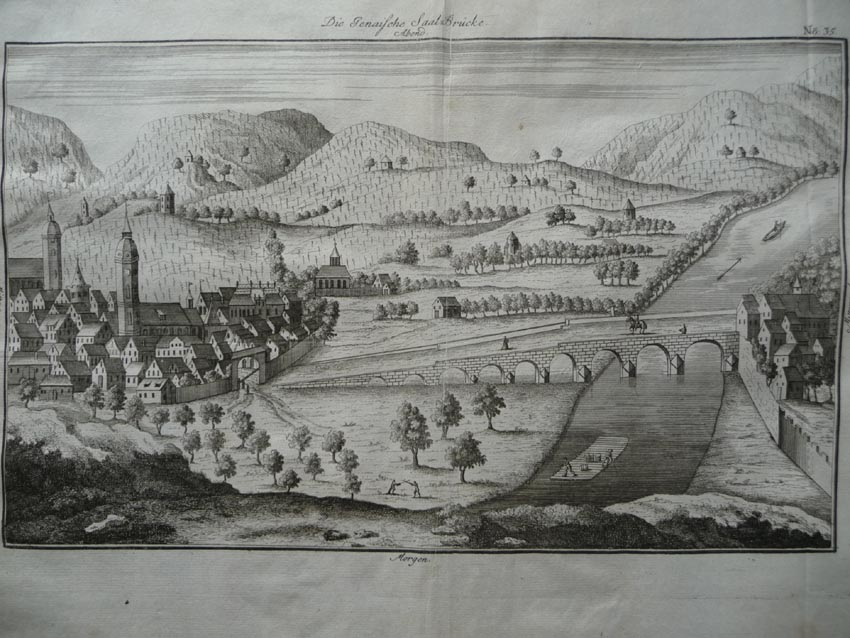
Camsdorf Bridge in 1735

The Camsdorf Bridge (German: Camsdorfer Brücke) over the Saale river in Jena, Germany connects the city center of Jena with the suburb of Wenigenjena, and is considered to be the oldest stone arch bridge in Jena.

== History ==
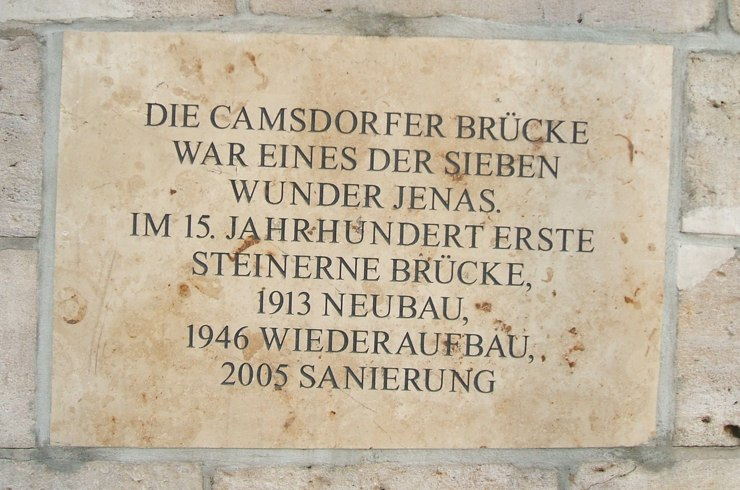
One of the inscriptions on the bridge

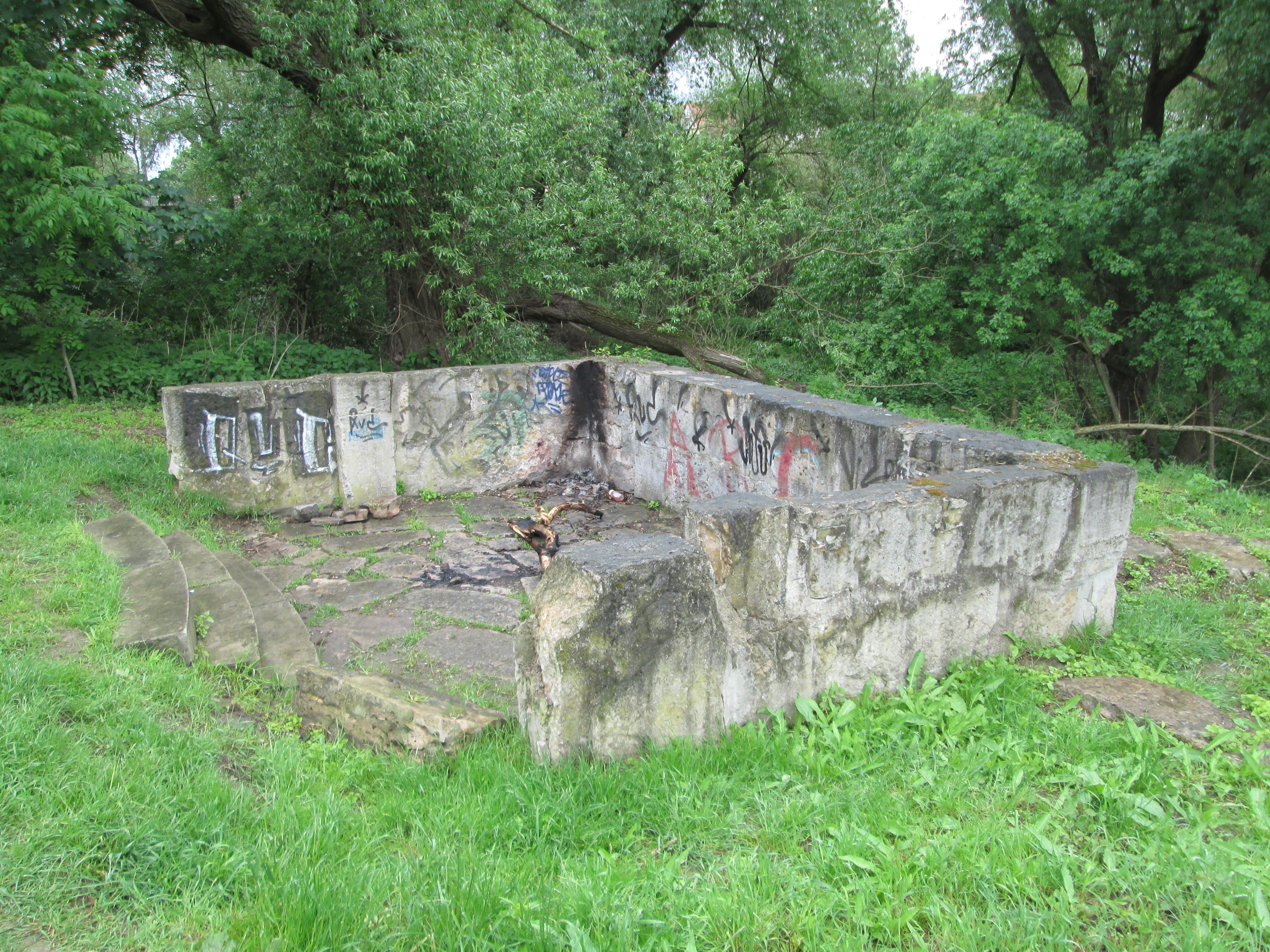
The remains of the original Camsdorf Bridge

=== First stone bridge, 15th century ===
A wooden bridge spanned the Saale until the construction of the first stone bridge in the 15th century. In 1416, the bridge included a hermitage in which a man could request alms for the bridge. The stone arch bridge was built around 1480 and consisted of nine arches. It was an important crossing over the Saale, which at that time often flooded its banks, and served to connect Jena to the settlements east of the city. The stones used in its construction originated from the remnants of castles on the Hausberg mountain which were destroyed in 1304.

This old Camsdorf bridge was included under the Latin name Pons as one of the Seven Wonders of Jena. It featured its own chapel, in which a stone or wooden cross stood until 1824 marking the border between the urban area and Camsdorf. In the guesthouse Grüne Tanne by the bridge, Goethe wrote Der Erlkönig.

In 1575, two additional arches were added on the Camsdorf side of the bridge.

The history of the original bridge also includes some tragic events:

- In late January 1637 during the Thirty Years' War, invading Swedish troops already had most of Jena under their control when Imperial reinforcements under Count Götze arrived. In order to thwart the enemy's advance, an arch of the bridge was destroyed with explosives. In the blast, up to 36 workers and soldiers were killed. From 1637 to 1655 a temporary wooden structure covered the gap in the bridge; the damage was finally repaired in 1655 by the master builder Moritz Richter on the order of Duke William of Saxe-Weimar.
- In 1716, a frightened horse jumped over the railing and carried its unfortunate rider to his death.
- On 7 July 1823, a heavily pregnant woman named Maria Hüttich crossing the bridge with a heavy basket leaned against the railing to rest. She lost her balance and fell into the Saale; on the following day she delivered a stillborn baby boy and then herself died.

=== Second construction, 1913 ===
With increasing development and industrialization during the 19th century, the need for a new bridge was recognized. The majority of the contemporary population however regarded the Camsdorf Bridge as a valuable historical monument which should be preserved.

To handle the growing traffic, the old bridge was demolished in July 1912 and its replacement was completed by November 1913. On the southwest pillar of the bridge, a small pavilion was erected containing a statue of the Archangel Michael, patron saint of Jena. In addition to regular vehicle and pedestrian traffic, the new bridge supported a tram line connecting Jena and Weningenjena.

=== Third construction, 1946 ===
The rebuilt bridge was destroyed in 1945 by Wehrmacht sappers in an effort to obstruct the eastward progress of Allied armies. Its destruction was nevertheless tactically useless as the Americans had already crossed the Saale elsewhere at Kunitz. The damage was surveyed in the weeks immediately following the war, and the bridge was quickly rebuilt in 1946 with Soviet help. The rebuilt bridge was dubbed the "Bridge of German-Soviet Friendship" and was the first structure in Jena rebuilt after the war.

For many years, the Camsdorf Bridge was the only crossing over the Saale in the vicinity of Jena which heavy vehicles could traverse.

== Present status ==
The bridge was extensively renovated in 2005 as a result of serious wear. The tram line was also expanded, from a single to a double lane. Upon its reopening in 2005, a festival was held on the bridge for the first time.

== Literature ==
- Carl Christian Schramm: Historischer Schauplatz, in welchem die Merkwürdigsten Brücken aus allen vier Theilen der Welt, Insonderheit aber Die in den vollkommensten Stand versetzte Dreßdner Elb-Brücke, In saubern Prospecten, Münzen und andern Kupferstichen, vorgestellet und beschrieben werden: Durch brauchbare Anmerkungen und besondere Urkunden erläutert, Auch mit nöthigen Registern versehen. Leipzig, 1735 pp. 139–142 (Vogelschau-Ansicht der Brücke (um 1700) Digitalisat. The original can be found in the Heidelberg university library.)

== See also ==
- List of medieval stone bridges in Germany
