= Corpus Christi (Syven album) =

Studio album by Syven
- Released: December 6, 2012
- Genres: Ambient, neofolk, metal
- Languages: Cornish, English, Latin, Old English
- Label: Audiokratik

Syven chronology
Aikaintaite (2011)	Corpus Christi (2012)

Corpus Christi is the second full-length album by the Finnish ambient, neofolk, and metal band Syven. It was released on December 6, 2012, through Audiokratik.

== Track listing ==
All tracks are written by Aslak Tolonen.

No.	Title	Length
1.	"Corpus Christi; I. "Ploratio"; II. "Corpus Christi"; III. "Renascentia"; IV. "Crucem Sanctam Subiit""	35:00
Total length:		35:00

== Credits ==
- Aslak Tolonen – all instruments
- Andy Koski-Semmens – vocals
