= Grüne Tanne =

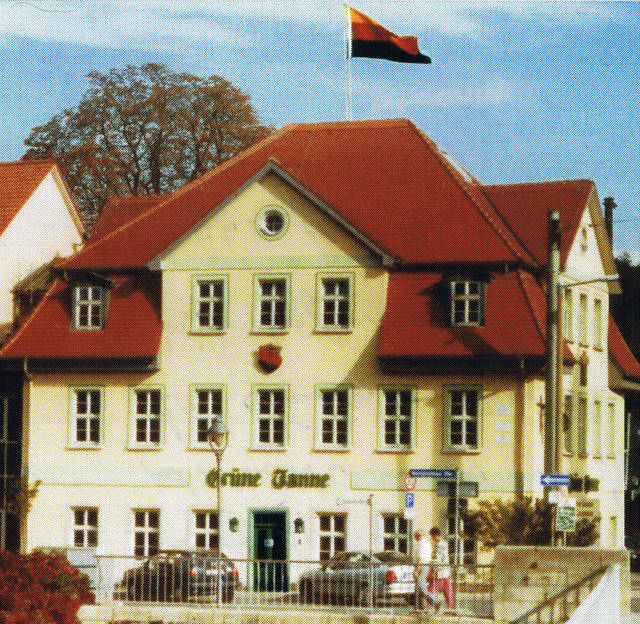
- The Grüne Tanne with the flag of the Burschenschaft

- Location within Thuringia

General information
- Status: Completed
- Type: Mixed use: Inn, meeting venue, restaurant
- Location: Karl-Liebknecht-Straße 1, 07749 Jena, Thuringia, Germany
- Coordinates: 50°55′42.88″N 11°35′48.66″E

Website
- www.gasthaus-gruene-tanne.de

The Grüne Tanne (German: Green Fir) is a historical Gasthaus by the Camsdorf Bridge in Jena, Thuringia, Germany.

== History ==
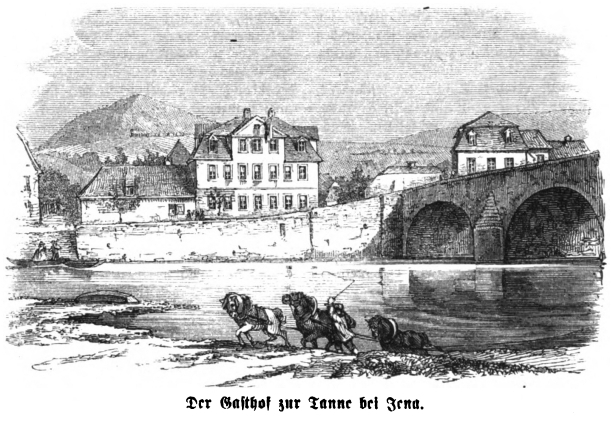
"The Inn at the Fir near Jena" (1865)

The age of the building cannot be definitively determined owing to many renovations over the years, though the vaults of the cellar suggest an initial construction in the Gothic period (12th to 14th century). The inn has borne the name "Grüne Tanne" since 1751, at which time it belonged to the village of Camsdorf east of Jena.

The Gasthaus has always been a popular destination for excursions by students of the University of Jena, since it was outside the city limits until 1909 and therefore free from the jurisdiction of the university. In 1815 the Urburschschaft was established here. During his residence in Jena from 1817 to 1818, Johann Wolfgang von Goethe stayed on the top floor of the Grüne Tanne. In the early twentieth century, it a meeting places for trade unions and social democrats. Since the incorporation of Wenigenjena and Camsdorf in 1909, the Grüne Tanne is contained within the urban area of Jena.

During the time of the German Democratic Republic, the building fell into disrepair. In 1993, the Grüne Tanne was renovated and began again to be used as a headquarters (Korporationshaus) for the Arminia Burschenschaft on the Burgkeller student society. Since 1998 it has also been used again as a Gasthaus, with only the lower floor being publicly accessible.

== Literature ==
- Peter Kaupp: Zinne über’m Brückenbogen. Festschrift anläßlich der Erneuerung der „Grünen Tanne“ in Jena. Dieburg 1994.

== Links ==
- Webseite des Gasthauses Grüne Tanne
- Did Goethe write the Erl King in the Tanne in Jena?, Ostthüringer Zeitung.
