= Uwe Nolte =

German poet, musician and graphic artist (born 1969)

Uwe Nolte (born 11 May 1969 in Merseburg) is a German poet, musician and graphic artist.

== Life and work ==
Uwe Nolte is a contemporary German poet. His work is an attempt to translate the concerns and aesthetics of German Romanticism into the present age. Formally orientated on traditional role models such as Joseph von Eichendorff and Nikolaus Lenau, his poetry is characterised by emotional depth and tenderness, archaic imagery and a fast-paced rhythm. Nolte frequently approaches the contemporary world and personal experiences through ancient symbols, myths, historical figures and nature.

Born in 1969, Nolte grew up in the formerly Soviet-occupied Eastern part of Germany (GDR). Like many East Germans who were disillusioned with the GDR's ideologically constrained education system, Nolte is entirely self-taught. Major influences on his artistic development were Friedrich Hölderlin, Jakob Böhme and Friedrich Nietzsche. At the age of 21, he served as a soldier at the German-German frontier, where he refused to shoot at fellow Germans who tried to escape from the Soviet- to the US-occupied sector. Unpleasant experiences with the foreign imposed Soviet system did not prevent Nolte from developing a fascination with Russian culture and landscape. In 2011, Nolte moved to Samara with his former partner and fellow artist of Russian-German ancestry, Kristina Zieber. Nolte remains deeply impressed with the archaic and sometimes brute force he encountered in the Russian wilderness, where "powerful spirits are still alive, forming an essential part of people's daily lives." Nolte's Russian experience is reflected in his recent poetry collection "Falke Heime".

== Music ==
Music is an integral part of Nolte's life and creative path. His poetry has been set to music by independent artists from his home region, such as Forseti from Jena. Nolte himself has been involved in several music projects, such as Barditus, Sonnentau and Orplid (with Frank Machau). The soundscape of Orplid is experimental, with links to Neofolk and Neoclassical music. It draws inspiration from the main currents of the German tradition: Germanic and Greek mythology, medieval Christian symbolism, 19th century Romanticism, and the all-pervasive notion of the sanctity of nature. The name of the band is taken from the opening line of the poem "Gesang Weylas" (Weyla's Song) by 19th-century Swabian poet Eduard Mörike: "Du bist Orplid, mein Land." (You are Orplid, my land). The music is based on lyrics by Nolte and other German poets, such as Friedrich Schiller, Annette von Droste-Hülshoff, Joseph von Eichendorff, Gottfried Benn, Oda Schaefer, Frank Wedekind and Rolf Schilling. Orplid have rendered a musical interpretation of the "Merseburg Incantations" in overtone singing, which Nolte learned from shamans in Russia.

== Cover songs ==
- Forseti, "Am Abend" (CD "Jenzig")
- Forseti, "Letzter Traum", (CD "Windzeit")
- Forseti, "Herbstabend", (CD "Windzeit")
- Forseti, "Müder Wanderer", (CD "Erde")
- Forseti, "Das Abendland", (CD "Erde")
- Von Thronstahl, "Noch blüht im Geist verborgen", (CD "Imperium internum")
- Stein, "Blume auf dem Felsenschorf", (CD "Am Feld")
- Christian Glowatzki, "Lied zur Nacht", (CD "Die Zeit legt ab ihr altes Kleid")
- Stern des Bundes, "Lichtmess", (CD "NolteX-Werkschau")
- Sonnenkind, "Flechte Blumen dir ins Haar", (CD "NolteX-Werkschau")

== Exhibitions ==
- 1996, Halle (D), Galerie am Eselsbrunnen
- 2004, Heldrungen (D), Wasserburg
- 2005, Portland (USA), Galerie "Heathen Art"
- 2005, Halle (D), Galerie "Kontaktart"
- 2010, Samara (RU), Galerie "Babylon"
- 2011, Suhl (D), Kultur- und Kongreßzentrum
- 2013, Merseburg (D), Kunststiftung "Ben zi Bena"
- 2015, Rübeland (D), Kreuzmühle

== Books ==
- Erik Zimmer (Hrsg.): Jugend dichtet. Poems of the youth. Ursprung-Verlag, Fürth i. Odw. 1990, ISBN 3-9800309-7-0.
- Michael K. Brust, Gerald Höfer: Tief im Schoße des Kyffhäusers. Anthology. Arte Fakt Verlagsanstalt, Dresden/ Bendeleben 2004, ISBN 3-937364-04-8.
- Andreas Diesel, Dieter Gerten: Looking for Europe – Neofolk und Hintergründe. Zeltingen-Rachtig 2005, ISBN 3-936878-02-1.
- Arnshaugk: Ein Lesebuch. Anthology. Verlag Arnshaugk, 2009, ISBN 978-3-926370-36-5.
- Das Lindenblatt. Anthology. Verlag Arnshaugk, 2011, ISBN 978-3-926370-55-6.
- Das Lindenblatt. Anthology. Verlag Arnshaugk, 2012, ISBN 978-3-926370-83-9.
- Das Lindenblatt. Anthology. Verlag Arnshaugk, 2014, ISBN 3-944064-26-7.
- Das Lindenblatt. Anthology. Verlag Arnshaugk, 2015, ISBN 3-944064-58-5.
- Das Lindenblatt. Anthology. Verlag Arnshaugk, 2016, ISSN 2194-8488.
- Uwe Nolte: Du warst Orplid, mein Land! Poems. Eisenhut Verlag, ISBN 978-3-942090-26-1.
- Uwe Nolte: Wilder Kaiser Poems. Verlag Arnshaugk, ISBN 3-944064-28-3.
- Uwe Nolte: Du warst Orplid, mein Land! Poems. 2. erw. Auflage. Verlag Arnshaugk, ISBN 3-944064-56-9.
- Uwe Nolte: Falke Heime Poems. Verlag Arnshaugk, ISBN 3-944064-62-3.
- Uwe Nolte: Schirjajewo Gedichte. Verlag Arnshaugk, ISBN 3-944064-90-9.
