= Valkama =

Valkama is a surname. Notable people with the surname include:

- Aarne Valkama, Finnish Nordic combined skier
- Erik Valkama, member of the Finnish band Dingo
- Jorma Valkama (1928–62), Finnish athlete
- Juha Valkama (born 1979), Finnish ice dancer
- Reino Valkama (1906–1962), Finnish actor
- Yrjö Valkama (1894–1975), Finnish diver
