= Aalto University Undergraduate Center =

Building in Otaniemi, Espoo

Coordinates: 60°11′11″N 24°49′35″E

Undergraduate Center Aalto University
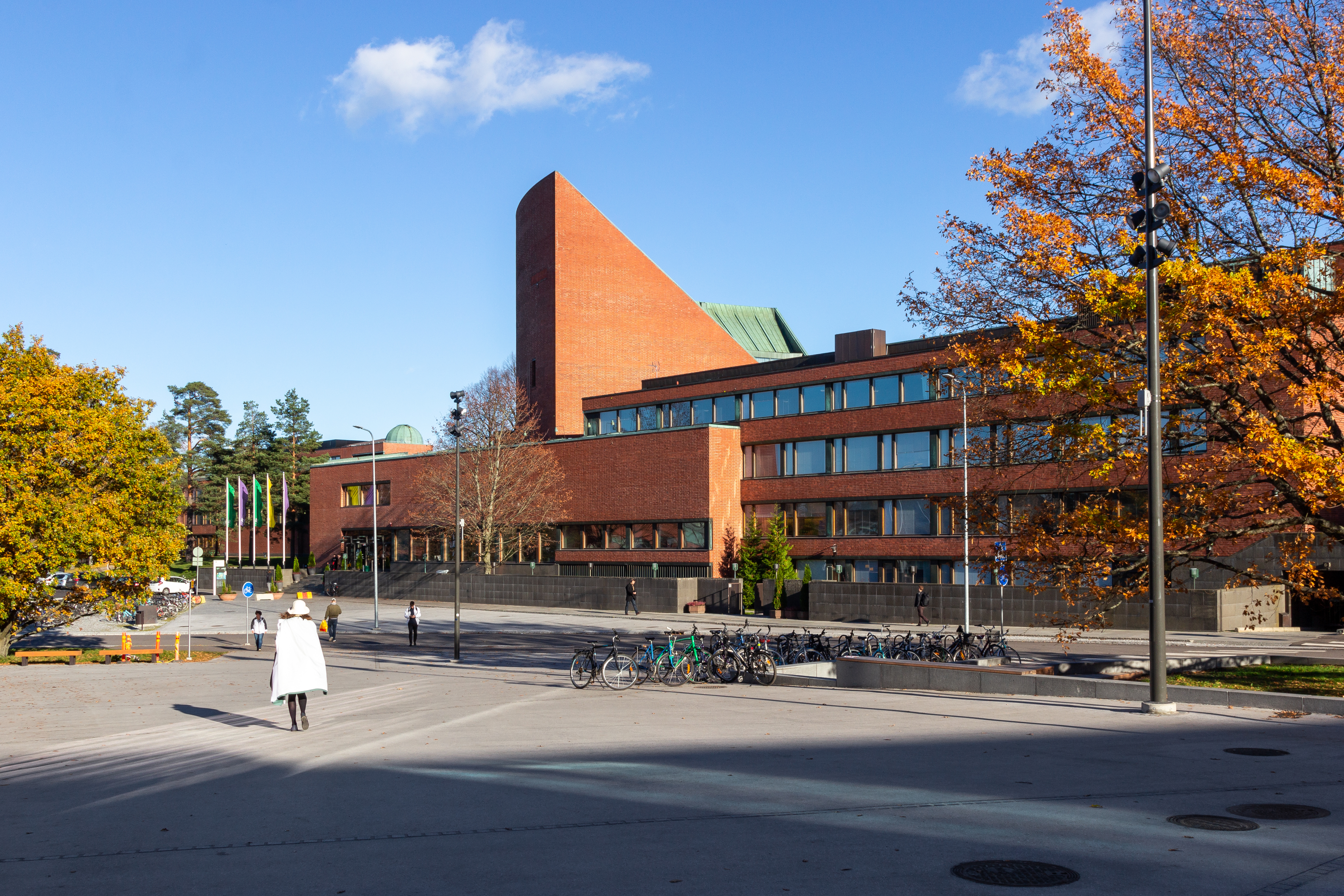
- Korkeakouluaukio side of the Aalto University Undergraduate Center in October 2018.

General information
- Location: Otakaari 1, Otaniemi, Espoo
- Completed: 1964, 1975
- Renovated: 2015–2016
- Owner: Aalto University Campus & Real Estate

Technical details
- Material: Brick, granite, copper

Design and construction
- Architect: Alvar Aalto

Renovating team
- Architect: Arkkitehdit NRT Oy

Aalto University Undergraduate Center is a building designed by the Architect Alvar Aalto. Originally the building was designed to serve as the main building of the Helsinki University of Technology. Today it is one of the main buildings of the Aalto University's campus in Otaniemi, Espoo.

The first part of the building was completed in 1965 and the extension with the major auditoriums in 1975. The library building of the university was completed in 1969, also designed by Alvar Aalto. The main building and the library are crucial part of the campus that is defined to be national cultural heritage of Finland. It became the Undergraduate Center, one of the main buildings of the new Aalto University, and all the buildings were renovated in the early days of the Aalto University.
