= Forseti (band) =

German neofolk band

Background information
- Origin: Jena, Thuringia, Germany
- Genres: Neofolk
- Years active: 1997 – 2005
- Labels: Eis Und Licht; Goeart; Grünwald
- Past members: Andreas Ritter

Forseti was a German neofolk band formed in Jena in 1997 and disestablished in 2005. The band is known for its musical settings of German romantic poetry.

== History ==
Having formed in Jena in 1997, Forseti debuted in 2000 with the 10" album Jenzig. The album established Andreas Ritter's literary interests with musical settings of Ludwig Uhland's "Gesang der Jünglinge" and Johann Wolfgang von Goethe's "Erlkönig". Ritter's interests were also present in references to 18th- and 19th-century poets such as Eduard Mörike, Joseph Freiherr von Eichendorff, Matthias Claudius, Friedrich Schiller and Friedrich Hölderlin, but also 20th-century writers such as Paul Celan and Friedrich Dürrenmatt.

The band's second album Windzeit was released in 2002 and includes poems by Hermann Hesse and Ricarda Huch. It features two song with lyrics by Uwe Nolte of the band Orplid, and guest performances from members of the band Sonne Hagal and from Douglas P. of Death in June.

In 2004 Forseti released its third and final album Erde. It includes covers of songs by Sonne Hagal and Orplid and guest performances from the Ukrainian opera singer Andrey Kulinich, B'eirth of the band In Gowan Ring, Kim Larsen of Of the Wand & the Moon and Ian Read of Fire + Ice. At the time of its release, Ritter described it as possibly the final chapter in this style of nature poetry, and said that he might move into something more historical or start to set older classics to music.

In May 2005, Ritter suffered a cardiac arrest which had serious consequences for his health. To support him, a number of neofolk acts collaborated on the compilation album Forseti lebt in 2006. The proceeds from the album went to support Ritter.

== Style and lyrical themes ==
Along with nature romanticism, another recurring theme is Germanic mythology. This is reflected in the band's name, taken from the god Forseti, and on the Jenzig tracks "Abschied", which references Ragnarök, and "Wolfzeit", where the title refers to the "wolf age" prophesied in Völuspá.

Forseti's music style is built around the acoustic guitar but also involves instruments such as accordion, cello, horn and flute. Ritter has mentioned Leonard Cohen and Johnny Cash as important musical influences.

== Discography ==
| Title | Album details |
|---|---|
| Jenzig | Released: 1999; Label: Eis Und Licht |
| Windzeit | Released: 2002; Label: Goeart and Grünwald |
| Erde | Released: 2004; Label: Goeart and Grünwald |
