= Mikko Kukkonen =

Finnish ice hockey player

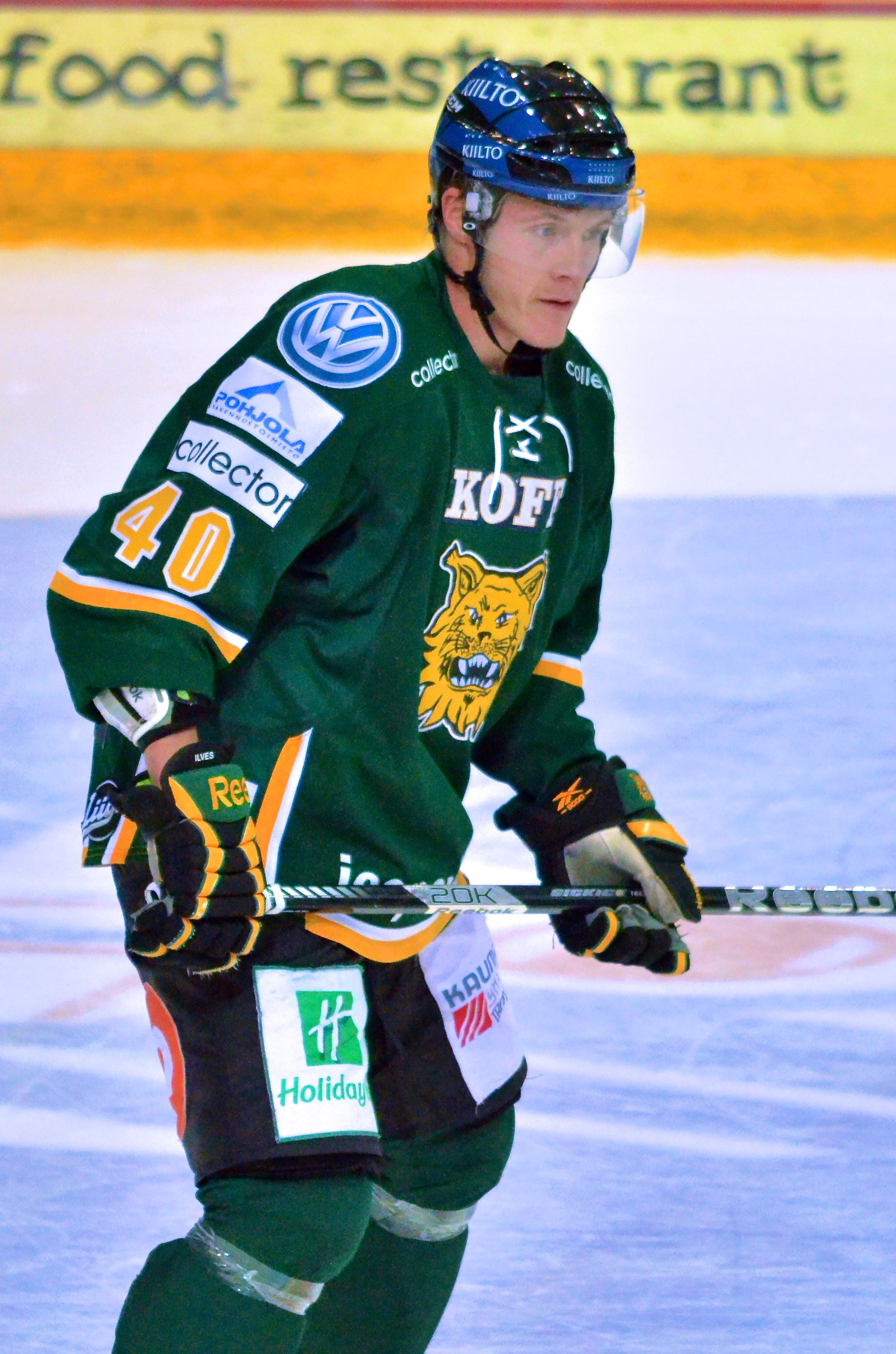
- Born: 19 January 1988 (age 37); Siilinjärvi, Finland
- Height: 6 ft 0 in (183 cm)
- Weight: 187 lb (85 kg; 13 st 5 lb)
- Position: Defence
- Shot: Left
- Played for: KalPa; Ilves; Espoo Blues; High1
- NHL draft: Undrafted
- Playing career: 2007–2017

Mikko Kukkonen (born 19 January 1988) is a Finnish former professional ice hockey defenceman.

Kukkonen played from 2006 to 2013 with KalPa.

== Career statistics ==
			Regular season					Playoffs
Season	Team	League	GP	G	A	Pts	PIM	GP	G	A	Pts	PIM
2003–04	KalPa U16	U16 SM-sarja	21	1	9	10	8	7	0	0	0	0
2003–04	KalPa U18	U18 SM-sarja	1	0	0	0	0	—	—	—	—	—
2004–05	KalPa U18	U18 SM-sarja	25	2	6	8	6	6	1	2	3	6
2005–06	KalPa U18	U18 SM-sarja	7	1	7	8	6	—	—	—	—	—
2005–06	KalPa U20	U20 SM-liiga	35	0	2	2	20	5	0	0	0	2
2006–07	KalPa U20	U20 SM-liiga	41	8	8	16	18	3	1	0	1	2
2006–07	KalPa	SM-liiga	8	0	0	0	0	—	—	—	—	—
2006–07	Suomi U20	Mestis	6	1	1	2	0	—	—	—	—	—
2007–08	KalPa U20	U20 SM-liiga	31	2	16	18	4	11	0	2	2	4
2007–08	KalPa	SM-liiga	20	0	0	0	4	—	—	—	—	—
2007–08	Suomi U20	Mestis	2	0	0	0	0	—	—	—	—	—
2008–09	KalPa	SM-liiga	57	0	3	3	28	12	0	1	1	10
2009–10	KalPa U20	U20 SM-liiga	13	1	3	4	4	—	—	—	—	—
2009–10	KalPa	SM-liiga	29	1	1	2	8	7	1	0	1	2
2010–11	KalPa	SM-liiga	47	1	4	5	41	7	1	1	2	29
2011–12	KalPa	SM-liiga	59	4	11	15	18	6	1	1	2	2
2012–13	KalPa	SM-liiga	52	3	4	7	8	5	0	1	1	0
2013–14	Ilves	Liiga	51	6	10	16	24	—	—	—	—	—
2014–15	Ilves	Liiga	56	0	8	8	26	2	0	0	0	14
2015–16	Espoo Blues	Liiga	60	1	9	10	28	—	—	—	—	—
2016–17	Gangwon High1	Asia League	46	8	11	19	128	—	—	—	—	—
Liiga totals			439	16	50	66	185	39	3	4	7	57
