= Weiland (album) =

Studio album by Empyrium
- Released: May 21, 2002
- Genre: Neofolk
- Length: 50:53
- Producer: Ulf Theodor Schwadorf

Empyrium chronology
Where at Night the Wood Grouse Plays (1999)	Weiland (2002)	The Turn of the Tides (2014)

Weiland is the fourth album by the German symphonic folk/doom metal band Empyrium. It is the second acoustic album released by the band, and the first to be completely sung in German language. All their previous albums only contained English lyrics, even though two songs on the album Where at Night the Wood Grouse Plays have German names, i.e. 'Abendrot' (English: Sunset glow) and 'Wehmut' (English: Melancholy), which are instrumental tracks.

The album is divided into three chapters (German: Kapitel): 1) Heidestimmung ("Heathland mood"), tracks 1–6; 2) Waldpoesie ("Forest Poetry"), track 7; and 3) Wassergeister ("Water Spirits"), tracks 8–12.

== Track listing ==
No.	Title	Length
1.	"Kein Hirtenfeuer glimmt mehr"	02:37
2.	"Heimwärts"	06:53
3.	"Nebel"	02:18
4.	"Fortgang"	07:18
5.	"A Capella"	00:52
6.	"Nachhall"	01:31
7.	"Waldpoesie"	13:58
8.	"Die Schwäne im Schilf"	05:48
9.	"Am Wasserfall"	01:49
10.	"Fossegrim"	03:35
11.	"Der Nix"	02:48
12.	"Das blau-kristallne Kämmerlein"	01:32
Total length:		50:53

== Personnel ==
- Ulf Theodor Schwadorf - guitars, bass, mellotron, drums, vocals, producer, recording, mixing, mastering, design
- Thomas Helm - vocals, grand piano

=== Additional personnel ===
- Susanne Salomon - violin, viola
- Julia Hecht - cello
- Horst Faust - bassoon
- Nadine Mölter - flute
- Niklas Sundin - cover art
- Łukasz Jaszak - design
