= Nest (band) =

Finnish neofolk/ambient band

- Origin: Riihimäki, Finland
- Genres: Neofolk, dark folk, ambient, dark ambient
- Years active: 1999 - present
- Labels: Corvus Records; Thundra Records; Infinite Vinyl
- Members: Aslak Tolonen; Timo Saxell
- Website: Official Homepage

Nest is a neofolk / ambient band from Riihimäki, Finland, formed in 1999. The band's inspiration comes from the Finnish folklore, as well as from the works of J. R. R. Tolkien and the Grimm Brothers. Kantele, a traditional Finnish musical instrument, is very prominent in the band's music. They contributed a cover of the song "The Gallant Crow" to the Skepticism tribute album "Entering the Levitation".

== Biography ==
Nest was formed in the spring of 1999 by Aslak Tolonen, who had previously composed computer-generated metal music. During the 1990s, Tolonen learned to play kantele, which coincided with gradual loss of heavy elements from his compositions, until he decided to settle on the acoustic and ambient style exclusively, marking the formation of the band. Nest's name was chosen to evoke the feelings of solace, comfort and freedom to experiment. The band's first demo, Fabled Lore, was released on 1 April 2000.

== Line-up ==
- Aslak Tolonen – kantele (15-string), ethnic & north drum, synthesizer, vocals
- Timo Saxell – bass, add. guitar, vocals

== Discography ==
=== Studio albums ===
- Woodsmoke (2003)
- Trail of the Unwary (2007)
- Mietteitä (2015)

=== Demos / splits ===
- Fabled Lore (2000)
- The Unseen Passage / Hidden Stream (2001)
- Agalloch/Nest Split 10" (2004)

=== Compilations ===
- Within a Decade (2014) - Contains all tracks from Fabled Lore, The Unseen Passage / Hidden Stream, Woodsmoke and Trail of the Unwary as well as some rare versions and covers

=== Featured On ===
- Entering the Levitation - a tribute to Skepticism (2007)
- Whom the Moon a Nightsong Sings (2010) (V/A)
