= Vare =

Vare is a surname. Notable people with the surname include:

- Ethlie Ann Vare (born 1953), Canadian-American journalist and screenwriter
- Flora M. Vare (1874-1962), American politician
- Glenna Collett-Vare (1903–1989), American golfer
- Jack Vare (born 1986), Papua New Guinean cricketer
- Marjaana Vare (born 1967), Finnish Paralympian athlete
- Raivo Vare (born 1958), Estonian politician, entrepreneur, and transit and economic expert
- Sulev Vare (born 1962), Estonian politician
- William Scott Vare (1867–1934), American politician

== See also ==
- Onnu Muthal Poojyam Vare, Malayalam language drama film (1986)
- Mazhavillinattam Vare, upcoming Malayalam–language sports and musical film
- Väre (disambiguation)
