= Orplid =

German musical group

- Origin: Germany
- Genres: Neofolk; Experimental; Post-industrial
- Years active: 1996–present
- Label: Prophecy Productions
- Members: Uwe Nolte; Frank Machau
- Past members: Volker Willhardt; Claudia Arndt
- Website: orplid.de

Orplid is a neofolk, martial, post-industrial and experimental music group of German musicians, Uwe Nolte and Frank Machau. The name is drawn from the poem Gesang Weylas by Eduard Mörike, beginning ‘Du bist Orplid, mein Land’ ('You are Orplid, my land'). Orplid in the poem is a faraway fantasy land. The band has progressed over the course of their discography from acoustic folk peppered with instruments like the piano, organ, and cello, to a more experimental minimalistic style.

== Discography ==
=== Albums and EPs ===
Year	Title	Additional information
1998	Orplid	CD. Two editions with different artwork. Limited to 500 copies each. Debut album.
1999	Das Schicksal (Fate)	10". 430 copies.
1999	Geheiligt Sei Der Toten Name (Hallowed be the names of the dead)	CD5"
2000	Orplid	CD. Reissue with bonus tracks and new artwork.
2001	Barbarossa	10"
2002	Nächtliche Jünger (Nocturnal Youth)	CD and limited 2x10" LPs with booklet limited to 500 copies.
2006	Sterbender Satyr (Dying Satyr)	CD.
2007	Frühe Werke (Early Works)	CD, compilation of early and unreleased material.
2008	Greifenherz (Gryphon Heart)	CD
2010	Whom the Moon a Nightsong Sings	CD, compilation of various neofolk artists songs. Disc 2.
