= Väre =

Väre is a Finnish surname. Notable people with the surname include:

- Emil Väre (1885–1974), Finnish wrestler
- Eero Väre (born 1984), Finnish ice hockey player
- Hjalmar Väre (1892–1952), Finnish road racing cyclist

== See also ==
- Väre (building), a university building in Espoo, Finland
- Vare (disambiguation)
