= Kukkonen =

Kukkonen is a Finnish surname. Notable people with the surname include:

- Annika Kukkonen (born 1990), Finnish women's footballer
- Antti Kukkonen (1889–1978), Finnish Lutheran pastor and politician
- Lasse Kukkonen (born 1981), Finnish ice hockey player
- Mikko Kukkonen (born 1988), Finnish ice hockey player
- Sinikka Kukkonen (1947–2016), Finnish orienteer
- Sirpa Kukkonen (born 1958), Finnish orienteer
