= Black Market Enlightenment =

Studio album by Antimatter
- Released: 9 November 2018
- Studio: Wyresdale Studios, Gates Of Dawn, Alpha Sound, 3rd Planet
- Genre: Progressive rock
- Label: Music In Stone
- Producer: Daniel Cardoso, Mick Moss

Antimatter chronology
Live Between The Earth & Clouds (2017)	Black Market Enlightenment (2018)	An Epitaph (2019)

Professional ratings
Review scores
Source	Rating
Progressive Music Planet	10/10 stars
Metal Hammer	5/5 stars

Black Market Enlightenment is the seventh album by the UK art rock band Antimatter, released on 9 November 2018 by Music In Stone. A lead video-single 'The Third Arm' was released on 5 October 2018. It is the 4th consecutive Antimatter studio album to be written entirely by Mick Moss, the previous 3 being Leaving Eden, Fear of a Unique Identity and The Judas Table.

== Background ==
Due to touring fatigue, Mick Moss put the Antimatter live band on semi-hiatus beginning in March 2017, and set to work on the 7th Antimatter album, which was tentatively titled 'Refraction'. Speaking in the 2018 documentary 'Finding Enlightenment', Moss says that he "had known for a long time exactly what the 7th Antimatter album would be about". Speaking in December 2018 to Progressive Music Planet - "The concept is about how I used to view LSD and cannabis when I was in my late teens/early twenties, and the irony of how I ended up actually suffering from a deep existential crisis, coupled with psychosis, panic attacks, chronic paranoia, derealisation and agoraphobia, despite the fact that I was convinced those drugs were the path to enlightenment."

The writing period lasted for a year, during which time the title was changed from 'Refraction' to 'Black Market Enlightenment'. Speaking with Headbangers Lifestyle - "I decided very early on that I would not reach into my archive of unreleased songs whatsoever (something I haven't done since 2003's 'Lights Out'), thus forcing myself to create an entirely new work from a blank canvass. I also decided that I would try and write away from the acoustic guitar as much as possible in order to draw something new out of myself. After that, it was just, get free. Get free. Let the music come and let it be what it wants to be. Let the songs with the strongest identities float up to the top, regardless of what style of music they are."

== Recording ==
As with the majority of his own Antimatter recordings, Moss elected to perform the core instruments of guitars, bass, synths and e-bows himself. Guest musicians were drafted in the form of Fab Regmann (drums), Carla Lewis (vocals), Julie Rodaway (flute), Paul Thomas (saxophone) and Vardan Baghdasaryan (kamancheh). The song 'Existential' features a posthumously released vocal cameo by the late Aleah Starbridge.

Recording began on the first day of May 2018 at Gates Of Dawn Studio, Boos, Germany, where the drums were laid down. The rest of the album was recorded at Moss' Wyresdale Studios, Liverpool, England, except for kamancheh, flute and saxophone. Speaking of the latter instruments for Headbangers Lifestyle - "I planned to have a sax (on Leaving Eden) and then I ran out of time... and the same thing happened album after album. It almost happened again this time but I forced myself to make the effort to find somebody before the clock struck midnight. Paul Thomas was amazing... As for the qamancha, I was on my way to Armenia to film the promo video to 'The Third Arm' and I asked Andre Simonian (The Beautified Project) if he could find me a session musician who played qamancha. At that point I didn't even know what the instrument was called, I'd just heard in on movie soundtracks like 'Gladiator' and 'The Last Temptation Of Christ'. Vardan Baghdasaryan did an amazing job. Same thing with Julie Rodaway on the flute. I just wanted this album to stand apart from the rest of the discography, and I felt that the whole lead-guitar break, that's been done to death since 'Eden...' and I just wanted to hear something different this time."

Recording took five months to complete, and was co-produced between Moss and Daniel Cardoso, who had worked with Moss on his previous five releases (including the Sleeping Pulse album).

== Artwork ==
The front cover image was created by Mario S. Nevado. The image, similarly to their previous work together 'The Judas Table', was executed by Nevado from a specific concept by Moss, who says he "asked for a crash-test dummy in a shitty armchair in a shitty apartment, with the Buddhist 8 arms, each hand holding a different specific item of street drug or street drug paraphernalia ...and in the background, the universe is creeping in...". Along with the album's title, the picture reflects the ideological mixing up of spirituality and street drugs. The items in the dummy's 6 outstretched hands are, clockwise L-R, a hash-pipe, a small sheet of 'strawberry' LSD tabs, a rolled up UK £10 banknote, a cheap cigarette lighter, a cannabis joint and a bag of amphetamines. The two lower, central hands are each holding a Rizla cigarette paper, poised to make a 3-paper joint as was common in Liverpool in the 80's and 90's.

== Release ==
Black Market Enlightenment was released on November 9, 2018, coinciding with the first show on the 'Black Market Tour'.

The album was released in three versions, containing 1, 2 and 3 discs respectively. The 2-disc edition held a DVD as the second disc, containing 'The Third Arm' promo video, 'What Do You Want Me To Do?' acoustic session, and a 50-minute documentary 'Finding Enlightenment', as well as extended liner notes and paintings from the 1990s by Mick Moss. The 3-disc edition contained the 2-disc edition in a slipcase signed by Mick Moss, Fab Regmann and Carla Lewis, with the addition of the 'Between The Atoms' CD single, 'The Third Arm' lyric sheet written by Mick Moss, and a hand-numbered card containing a section of string from the instruments used to record the album. The 3-disc edition was strictly limited to 300 copies, and sold out before the album's release.

== Track listing ==
All songs written by Mick Moss

No.	Title	Length
1.	"The Third Arm"	4:57
2.	"Wish I Was Here"	6:40
3.	"This Is Not Utopia"	6:27
4.	"Partners in Crime"	5:50
5.	"Sanctification"	7:15
6.	"Existential"	7:19
7.	"What Do You Want Me to Do?"	2:32
8.	"Between the Atoms"	8:25
9.	"Liquid Light"	6:14

== Credits ==
- Music and lyrics: Mick Moss
- Guest appearances: Fab Regmann (Drums), Vardan Baghdasaryan (Qamancha), Paul Thomas (Saxophone), Julie Rodaway (Flute), Carla Lewis (Additional Vocals 1-5,8,9), Aleah Starbridge (Additional Vocals 6)
- Artwork: Mario Nevada
