= Phase (band) =

Greek-British rock band

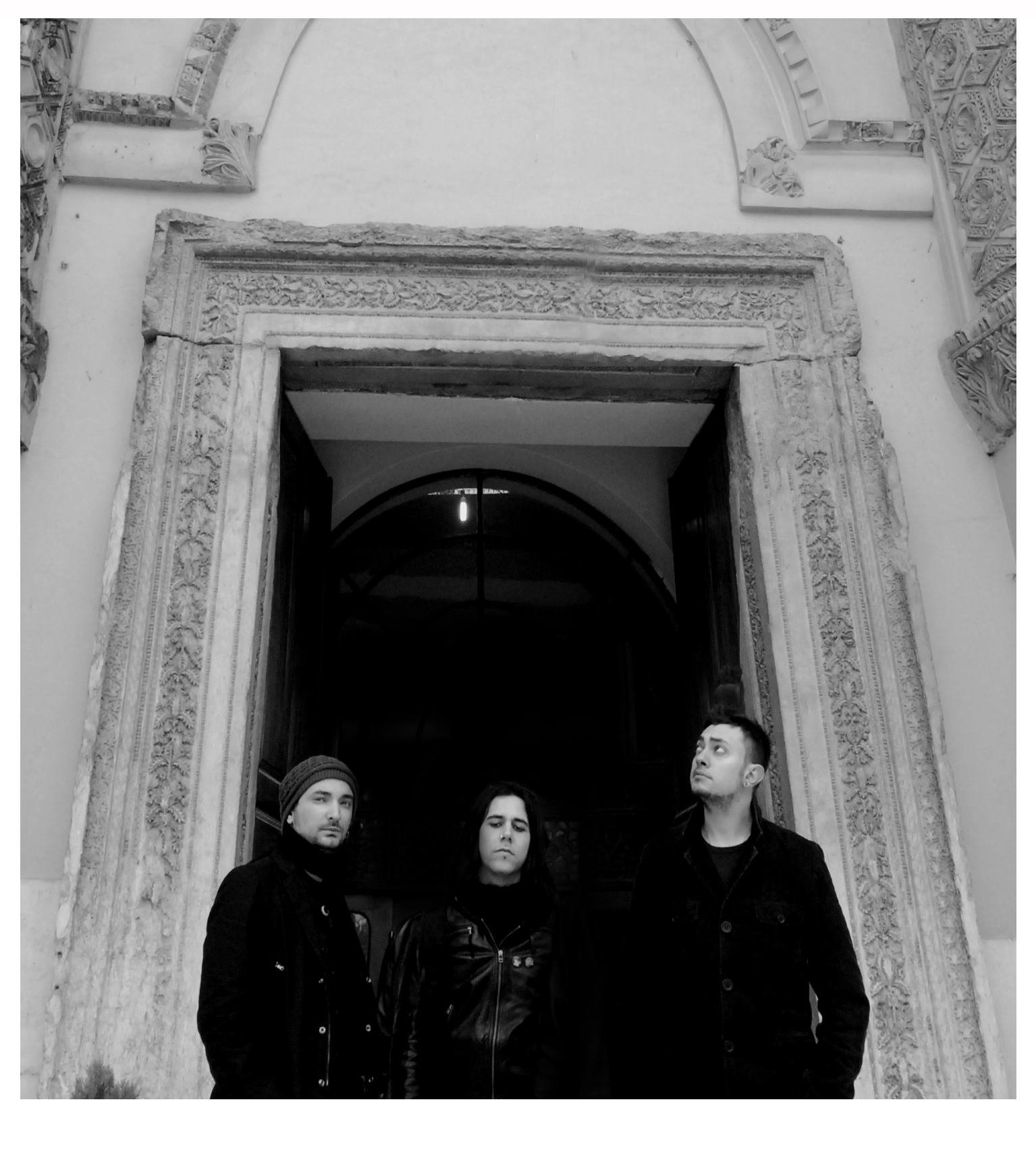
- Phase in front of the Gate of Qasr al-Heir al-Gharbi

Background information
- Origin: Larissa, Greece
- Genres: Alternative rock, progressive rock, psychedelic rock, progressive metal (early)
- Years active: 2003–present
- Label: BackStage
- Members: Thanos Grigoriou; Damos Harharidis; Vasilis Liapis; Adam Schindler; Jak Nathan Owen Neil Carl Edward Kelly
- Website: www.phase.gr

Phase /feɪz/ is a UK-based rock band formed in Larissa, Greece in 2003. It was founded by Thanos Grigoriou, who was performing and recording with various members until the line-up was completed in 2011, with the addition of Damos Harharidis and Vasilis Liapis. They debuted with their digital single Perdition under Microsoft's "Playlist Seven" co-promotion campaign for the release of Windows 7, which was followed by two full-length albums In Consequence and the Wait.

== History ==
=== Formation (2003;2008) ===
Phase was formed in 2003 and played intermittently until 2008 when they began recording their album In Consequence and performed at concerts. Soon after they had a functional line up they recorded Perdition which was the very first track Phase ever recorded to be later a part of Microsoft's Playlist 7 campaign.

== Response ==
Phase has been the subject of several alternative rock publications and has generally been well received by its critics. They have had interviews in various magazines and radiostations and have received praise for their shows.

The band entered Billboard's "uncharted" having as highest position #42, while they charted on #12 of the fastest rising acts powered by the week of 23 June 2012.

Tom Robinson of the BBC has noticed their second record and has given them airplay on his radioshow.

== Collaborations ==
Duncan Patterson (Alternative 4, ex-Antimatter), better known from his involvement with the British rock band Anathema, has contributed on Phase's first record, In Consequence.

Alexis Marcou has contributed in various of their artworks.

== Touring ==
The band has shared stages with various artists like Anneke van Giersbergen, Danny Cavanagh, Sivert Høyem (ex-Mardugada), Jeff Martin (The Tea Party), The Twillight Sad, Antimatter among others.

Phase has performed and is still into performing a considerable number of shows without any major management supporting them, in and out of their territory's borders, and they are said to be the second international rock act, after the Gorillaz, ever to play in Syria (Damascus, 7 January 2011).

=== Concert tours ===
Duration	Concert tour	Regions	Line ups	Supporting releases
Dec 2008 – Feb 2010	Road to Perdition	Greece	Thanos Grigoriou, Alex Arnaoutoglou, Chris Gioldasis, Dinos Athanaselos, Dimitris Lytras	Perdition
March 2010 – Sep 2013	In Tour Sequence	Europe, Middle East	Thanos Grigoriou, Damos Harharidis, Vasilis Liapis, Marios Papakostas, Alex Arnaoutoglou, Dimitris Athanaselos, Mike Maroulis, Dimitris Lytras, Dinos Athanaselos, Thanos Kandylas	In Consequence
Oct 2013 - Feb 2015	Waiting Around Tour	UK, Europe	Thanos Grigoriou, Damos Harharidis, Vasilis Liapis, Marios Papakostas, Mike Maroulis, Fardin Esfandiari, Adam Schindler	Amethyst, The Wait, Point of You
May 2015 – Aug 2015	Tour Unseen	UK	Thanos Grigoriou, Vasilis Liapis, Fardin Esfandiari, Adam Schindler	Dream Unseen

== Discography ==
=== Studio albums ===
- In Consequence (2010)
- The Wait (2014)

=== Singles ===
- "Perdition" (single) (2009)
- "Amethyst" (single) (2013)
- "Point of You" (single) (2014)

== Musical style, genre and influence ==
The band takes influence from a variety of artists and musical traditions and they often cite Depeche Mode, Nine Inch Nails, Rainbow, Bruce Dickinson, the Beatles, David Bowie, Massive Attack, Loreena McKennitt, Rock and Metal Music, Greek Rebetiko and so on, while the bands they are mostly compared to are: Alice in Chains, Nirvana, The Tea Party, Anathema, Porcupine Tree and more

== Charitable activity ==
On the beginning of 2016 marking five years since their gig in Damascus, they launched a fundraising campaign dedicated to Syrian families who were affected by the political crisis in the country.

On 15 May 2016, Phase performed the frames of NevFest Festival at Sunderland Stadium of Light.

== Members ==
Current members

- Thanos Grigoriou – spoken poetry, a variety of stringed instruments (2003–present)
- Damianos Harharidis – Bass, Synths (2011–present)
- Vasilis Liapis – Guitar, Piano (2011–present)
- Adam Schindler – drums, percussion (2014–2015, 2017–present)
- Jak Nathan Owen Neil Carl Edward Kelly

Former members

- Marios Papakostas – drums, percussion (2011–2014)
- Marco Volpe – (2016–2017)

Touring musicians

- Fardin 'Fez' Esfandiari - keyboards, drums, bass, guitar, sax, percussion (2013–present)

== See also ==
- List of bands from Newcastle, United Kingdom
- List of post-punk revival bands
