= Vic Anselmo =

Latvian singer-songwriter

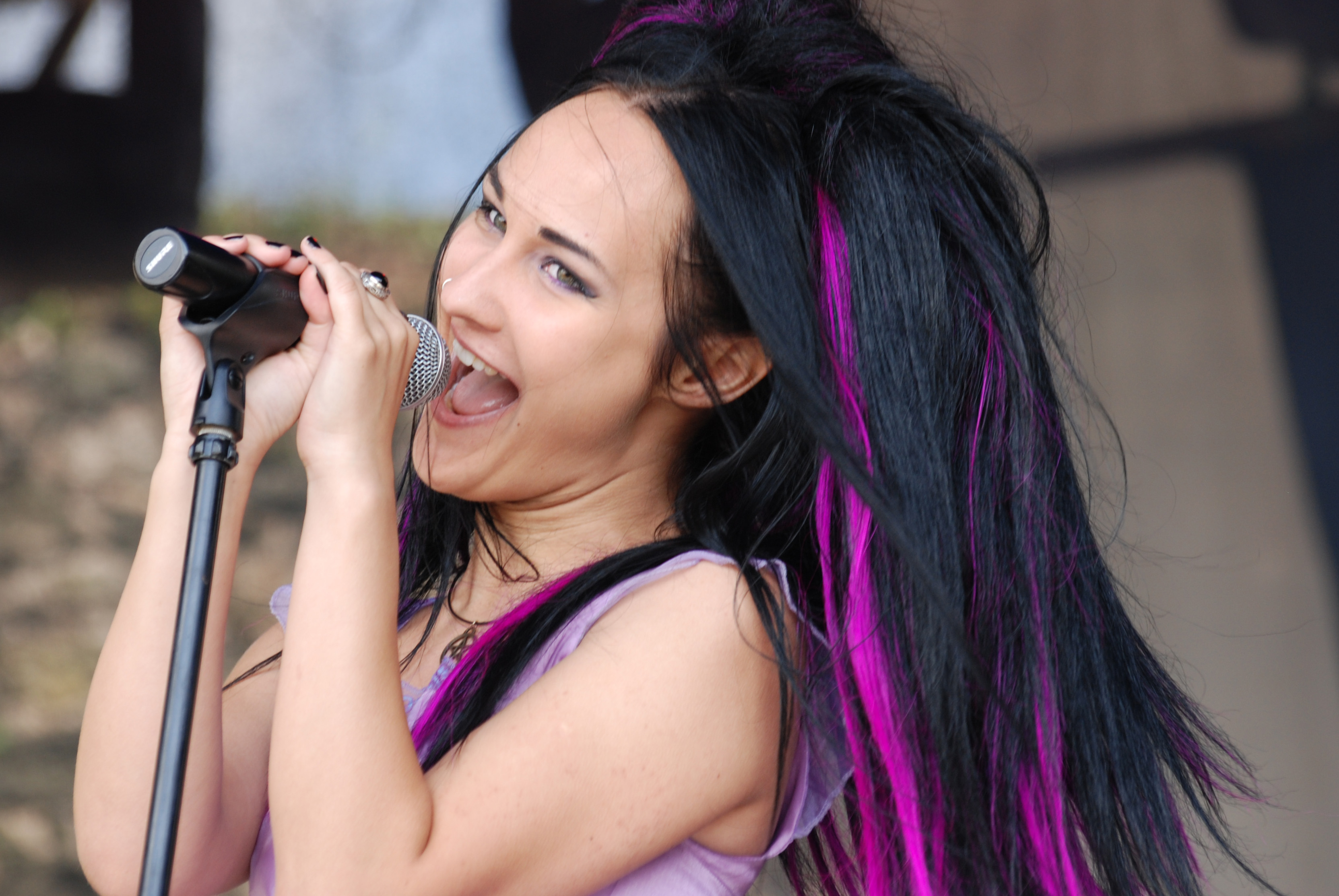
- Vic Anselmo at the Castle Party in 2009

Background information
- Born: Viktorija Kukule; 21 March 1985 (age 40); Riga, Latvia
- Website: www.vicanselmo.com

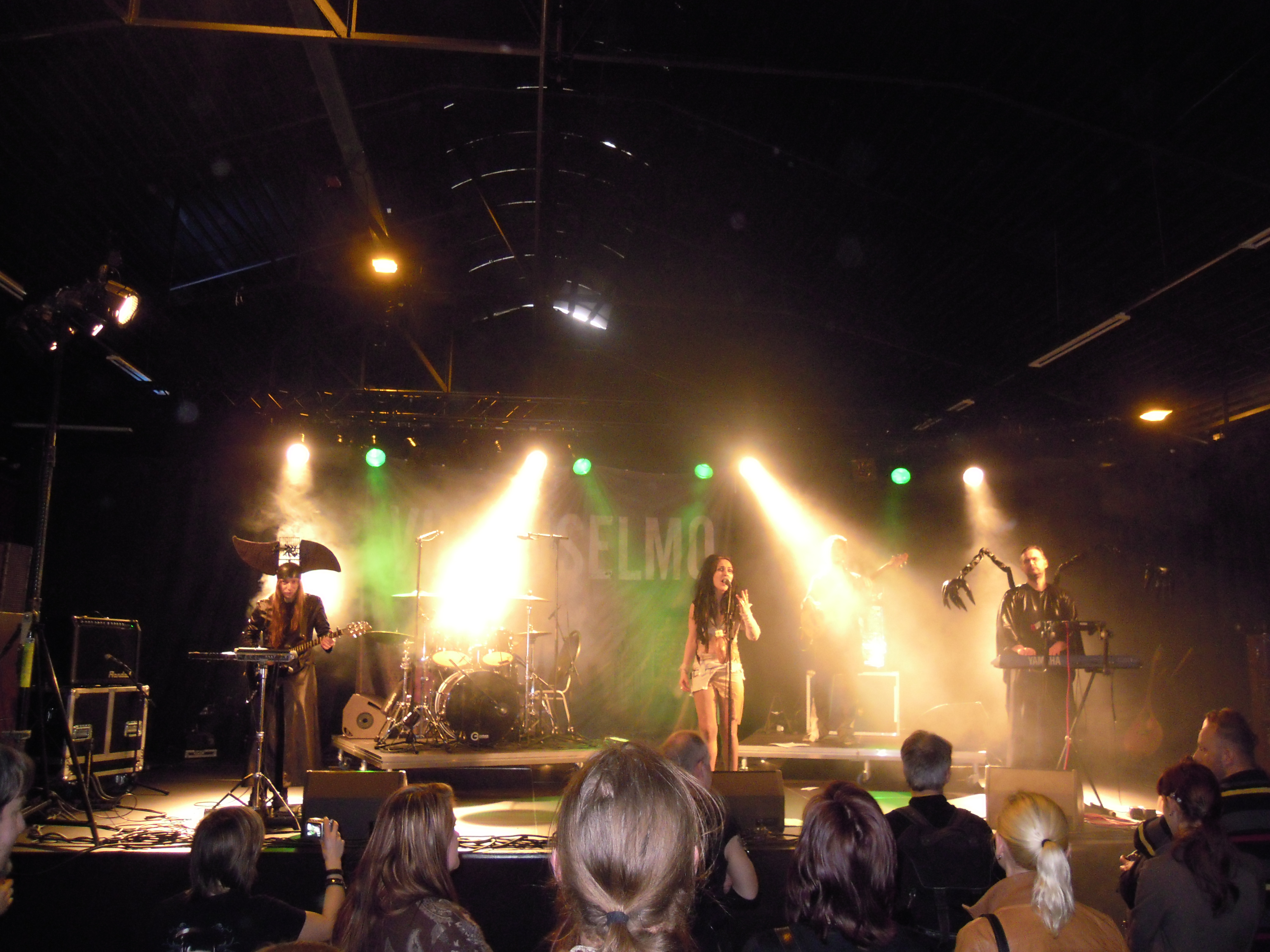
Vic Anselmo at the Gothic & Fantasy Fair in 2012

Vic Anselmo (born Viktorija Kukule; 21 March 1985, in Riga, Latvia) is a Latvian singer-songwriter who lives in Bochum, Germany. Starting out as a performer of gothic metal, Vic performed with her own band throughout her whole career amongst co-operations with several other musicians.

After she moved to Germany, Vic decided to adjust her performance to the singer-songwriter genre. Vic finds her inspiration for her self-written music in bands, artists and composers such as Ella Fitzgerald, Lisa Gerrard, Edvard Grieg, Queen, Alice in Chains, Tom Waits, and Devin Townsend. Her music accounts for the way to express her emotions by solely using her voice that is often referred to as "stunning". Her albums, with a wide range from sensitive ballads to shades of blues and folk, are often themed on her state of mind at that time. Her artist name is derived from the surname of Phil Anselmo, singer of the American metal band Pantera which she was a fan of in her youth.

== Career ==
Throughout her career, Vic was also involved in several interesting co-operations with the likes of Mick Moss (Antimatter), Anneke van Giersbergen (ex-The Gathering) and Duncan Patterson (ex-Anathema) amongst others.

In 2006 she released a demo-CD named Beverly. Later she released two CD's Trapped in a Dream (2008) and In My Fragile (2011). The latter album was released by Danse Macabre Records after label head Bruno Kramm became interested in Anselmo's cover of "Das dunkle Land".

In 2011 she was the opening act for the dark wave band Deine Lakaien.

On 2 October 2015 her new album Who Disturbs The Water was released.

== Festivals and tours ==
- 2008 Trapped in a Dream European Tour
- 2009 Wave-Gotik-Treffen (DE)
- 2009 Castle Party (PL)
- 2010 Waregem Gothic Festival (BE)
- 2010 Dark Mills (London, UK)
- February 2011 – Tour with Deine Lakaien In My Fragile European Tour
- August/September 2011 – Tour in China with To Die For
- 2012 Gothic & Fantasy Fair (Rijswijk, NL)
- 2012/2013/2014 Castlefest (NL)
- March/April 2013 tour with Antimatter
- January/February 2015 – Latin America Tour with The Sirens
- November 2015 – German Tour with Samsas Traum

== Discography ==
=== Albums ===
- Trapped in a Dream, 2008
- In My Fragile, 2011
- Who Disturbs the Water, 2015

=== EPs ===
- Backyard Novelties (Digital EP), 2016
