= Mark Kelson =

Australian musician (born 1976)

- Born: 7 March 1976 (age 50); Melbourne, Victoria, Australia
- Genres: Doom, dark rock, ambient, acoustic
- Occupation: Musician
- Instruments: Vocals, guitars, keyboards
- Years active: 1995–present
- Website: markkelson.com

Mark Kelson (born 7 March 1976) is an Australian musician from Melbourne, best known for his work as a member of The Eternal, Cryptal Darkness (1995–2002) and Alternative 4 (2010–2013).

== Career ==
Kelson began his music career in the doom band Cryptal Darkness. After three full-length albums and several personal differences in the band, Kelson left the band to begin his most successful project to date, The Eternal. Kelson has since recorded four full-length albums with The Eternal and toured extensively through Europe, North America, Mexico, Canada and parts of Asia, including Japan. The band was set to do their second Japanese tour in April 2011 but due to the tsunami that hit Japan a few days earlier, the band's Japanese label was forced to postpone the tour.

The Eternal worked with Canadian musician Jeff Martin of the multi-platinum band The Tea Party on their last album, 'Under A New Sun'. The album was co-produced by Martin and Kelson and also features them singing a duet on the song 'The Sleeper'.

During 2011, Kelson worked with Duncan Patterson (ex-Anathema, ex-Antimatter) to create a debut album called 'The Brink' for Duncan's new band. The band is called Alternative 4, which Duncan named after the Anathema album of the same name (a title he penned during his time in Anathema). The album was released in November 2011 on Avantgarde Music. This was not the first time Kelson and Patterson have worked together, with Kelson contributing to Patterson's earlier project, Íon.

In 2007 Kelson toured through Switzerland, Mexico, North America and Canada as a session guitarist for avant-garde metal act Virgin Black.

With many years' studio experience behind him, Kelson went on to study sound production and is also working as a studio sound engineer and producer with many up-coming Australian and international bands.

Between 2011 and 2012 Kelson completed two European tours as the frontman and guitarist of UK band Alternative 4.

Kelson completed production on the new album by The Eternal called When The Circle of Light Begins To Fade. As well as performing on the album, Kelson engineered, mixed and produced it. This album saw the band tour Australia with Finnish band Amorphis in October 2013.

In May 2014 Kelson completed his first solo acoustic tour of Japan with shows in Yokohama, Tokyo and Kyoto.

As of the end of May 2014 Kelson has almost completed work on his first solo album, Resurgence. The album is set for an August release.

Kelson also writes a series of articles on sound production for Japanese magazine DiGiRECO, focusing on home recording techniques.

== Discography ==
=== Solo ===
- 2014 – Mark Kelson – Resurgence (Sombre Light)

=== The Eternal ===
- 2018 – The Eternal – Waiting for the Endless Dawn (Inverse Records)
- 2013 – The Eternal – When The Circle of Light Begins To Fade (Sombre Light/Stay Metal Records)
- 2011 – The Eternal – Live at the East Brunswick Club (Sombre Light/Stay Metal Records)
- 2011 – The Eternal – Under A New Sun (Sombre Light/Stay Metal Records)
- 2010 – The Eternal – Under A New Sun CD Single (Sombre Light)
- 2008 – The Eternal – Kartika (Firebox Records/Stay Metal Records)
- 2005 – The Eternal – Sleep Of Reason (Firebox Records)
- 2004 – The Eternal – The Sombre Light Of Isolation (Firebox Records)
- 2003 – The Eternal – Promo 2003 (Independent)

=== Other ===
- 2019 – Suldusk – Luna Falls (Northern Silence Productions)
- 2011 – Alternative 4 – The Brink (Prophecy Productions)
- 2011 – Rainshadow – Waters Imperium (Independent)
- 2010 – Íon – Immaculada (Equilibrium Music)
- 2008 – Ashkhara – Soul Burning (Promo CD)
- 2007 – InSomnius Dei – Illusions Of Silence (Firebox Records)
- 2007 – Rainshadow – End Songs (Independent)
- 2007 – Painted Black – Verbo (Independent)
- 2006 – Íon – Madre, Protégenos (Equilibrium Music)
- 2006 – Rainshadow – Demo 2006 (Independent)
- 2002 – ThreeThirteen – ThreeThirteen (Independent)
- 2000 – Cryptal Darkness – Chapter II The Fallen (Icon Records)
- 1999 – Cryptal Darkness – They Whispered You Had Risen (Icon Records)
- 1997 – Cryptal Darkness – Promotional Sampler 1997 (Icon Records)
- 1996 – Cryptal Darkness – Endless Tears (Obscure Productions)
- 1996 – Cryptal Darkness – Descend into Thy Grave (Obscure Productions)
- 1995 – Paramaecium – Within The Ancient Forest (Independent)
