= Welcome to the Machine (EP) =

EP by Antimatter
- Released: 23 September 2016
- Genre: Progressive rock
- Label: Music In Stone
- Producers: Daniel Cardoso; Mick Moss

Antimatter chronology
The Judas Table (2015)	Welcome to the Machine (2016)	Live Between the Earth & Clouds (2017)

Professional ratings
Review scores
Source	Rating
ROCK CULT	9/10 stars
EMPIRE ZONE	9/10 stars

Welcome to the Machine is an EP by the UK band Antimatter. It was released on 23 September 2016.

== Track listing ==
No.	Title	Length
1.	"Welcome to the Machine" (Roger Waters)	6:41
2.	"Killer (Live)" (M.Moss)	5:21
3.	"Redemption (Live)" (M.Moss)	7:27
Total length:		19:29

== Personnel ==
Welcome to the Machine

- Mick Moss – vocals, electric guitar, keyboards, programming
- Dave Hall – lead guitar
- Jenny O'Connor – additional vocals
- Ste Hughes – bass
- Liam Edwards – drums

Killer & Redemption

- Mick Moss – vocals, electric guitar
- Dave Hall – lead guitar, additional vocals
- Ste Hughes – bass
- Liam Edwards – drums

Technical

- 'Welcome to the Machine' Recorded July/August 2016 at Wyresdale Studios, Liverpool, Engineered by Mick Moss, Published by Roger-Waters-Music-Overseas-LTD & BMG Rights Management (UK) LTD
- 'Killer' & 'Redemption' Recorded Live at De Boerderij, Zoetermeer, Netherlands, March 2016, Published by Mandarah Musikverlag
- Produced By Daniel Cardoso & Mick Moss
- Mastered by Daniel Cardoso
- Photography by Cristel Brouwer
- Artwork, Design & Layout by Mick Moss for Music In Stone
