= Alternative Matter =

Compilation album by Antimatter
- Released: 2010
- Genre: Gothic rock; trip hop
- Label: Prophecy Productions
- Producer: Mick Moss, Duncan Patterson

Antimatter chronology
| Live@An Club (2009) | Alternative Matter (2010) | Fear Of A Unique Identity (2012) |

Alternative Matter is a compilation album by the UK band Antimatter.

== Track listing ==
DISC ONE

| No. | Title | Length |
|---|---|---|
| 1. | "Black Sun (Dead Can Dance Tribute)" (Dead Can Dance) |
| 2. | "The Art Of A Soft Landing (Acoustic, Enhanced)" (M.Moss) |
| 3. | "Far Away (Live)" (D.Patterson) |
| 4. | "Saviour (Reel To Reel Demo)" (M.Moss) |
| 5. | "Landlocked (Mick Moss Remix)" (M.Moss) |
| 6. | "In Stone (Acoustic, Enhanced)" (M.Moss) |
| 7. | "Epitaph (New Version)" (M.Moss) |
| 8. | "Terminal (Duncan Patterson Remix)" (D.Patterson) |
| 9. | "Mr White (Live)" (Trouble) |
| 10. | "Flowers (New Version)" (D.Patterson) |
| 11. | "Expire (Lackluster Remix)" (D.Patterson) |

DISC TWO

| No. | Title | Length |
|---|---|---|
| 1. | "God Is Coming (Duncan Patterson Remix)" (D.Patterson) |
| 2. | "Everything You Know Is Wrong (Acoustic, Enhanced)" (M.Moss) |
| 3. | "A Portrait Of The Young Man (Enhanced)" (M.Moss) |
| 4. | "Flowers (Acoustic)" (D.Patterson) |
| 5. | "Holocaust (Reel To Reel Demo)" (D.Patterson) |
| 6. | "The Art Of A Soft Landing (4 Track Demo)" (M.Moss) |
| 7. | "Expire (Atrabilis Sunrise Remix)" (D.Patterson) |
| 8. | "Over Your Shoulder (Acoustic)" (M.Moss) |
| 9. | "Dream (4 Track Demo)" (M.Moss) |
| 10. | "Lost Control (Acoustic, Enhanced)" (D.Patterson) |
| 11. | "Epitaph (Orchestral Mix)" (M.Moss) |

DISC THREE - 'FORBIDDEN MATTER E.P.' (Limited Edition Artbook Only)

| No. | Title | Length |
|---|---|---|
| 1. | "Fighting For A Lost Cause (Demo)" (M.Moss) |
| 2. | "Enjoy The Silence (Live)" (Depeche Mode) |
| 3. | "Angelic (Mick Moss Remix)" (M.Moss) |
| 4. | "Over Your Shoulder (Reel To Reel Demo)" (M.Moss) |
| 5. | "Holocaust (FreeDoom Remix)" (D.Patterson) |
| 6. | "The Summer Effect (Instrumental Demo)" (D.Patterson) |
| 7. | "Angelic (Reel To Reel Demo)" (M.Moss) |

DISC FOUR - DVD (Limited Edition Artbook Only)

| No. | Title | Length |
|---|---|---|
| 1. | "Antimatter ' The Small Yesterdays' Documentary" (Directed by Mick Moss) |
| 2. | "Epitaph Promo" (Music M.Moss / Directed by Fethi Karaduman) |
| 3. | "Conspire Promo" (Music M.Moss / Directed by Krzystof Baran) |

== Credits ==
- Music and lyrics: Mick Moss, Duncan Patterson
- Guest appearances: Danny Cavanagh, Colin Fromont, Rachel Brewster, Chris Phillips, Lisa Cuthbert, Jenny O'Connor, Amber-Page Moss, Mark Hughes, Ste Hughes, Łukasz Langa, Cláudia Andrade
- Artwork: Concept by Duncan Patterson and Mick Moss, from an original image by Bill Purcell, NASA
