= In My Fragile =

Studio album by Vic Anselmo
- Released: 2011
- Genre: Electronic rock, symphonic rock, art rock, gothic rock, darkwave
- Label: Danse Macabre

Vic Anselmo chronology
Trapped in a Dream (2008)	In My Fragile (2011)	Who Disturbs the Water (2015)

In My Fragile is an album written by Vic Anselmo. It was released in 2011.

== Track listing ==
1. "Introduction"
2. "More Than You Can Comprehend"
3. "Open Wide"
4. "Horizon"
5. "Wellspring"
6. "Bone's Blues"
7. "Ashes"
8. "Secrets Of The Universe"
9. "Das Dunkle Land" (Das Ich Cover)
10. "In the Darkness"
11. "The Day"
12. "Who" (Acoustic Live, Zurich X-Tra)
13. "Bone's Blues" (Acoustic Live, Offenbach Capitol)
14. "Leaving Eden" (Acoustic Live, Offenbach Capitol) (Antimatter Cover)
15. "Tumsha Nakte" (Acoustic Live, Offenbach Capitol)
