= List of bands from Newcastle-upon-Tyne =

This article features a list of notable bands and musicians from Newcastle upon Tyne, and may also include some bands and musicians from the wider Tyneside conurbation.

== List of notable bands ==
- Alex Kapranos of Franz Ferdinand (partly raised in South Shields)
- Andy Taylor of Duran Duran (from Cullercoats)
- Angelic Upstarts
- Ant & Dec
- Atomkraft, thrash metal
- Brian Johnson of AC/DC and Geordie
- Bridie Jackson and the Arbour, winner of the Glastonbury Festival Emerging Talent Competition 2013
- Bryan Ferry of Roxy Music was born in Washington, County Durham but attended school in Newcastle and is a fan of Newcastle United
- Bruce Welch of the Shadows
- Cheryl of Girls Aloud
- Chris McCormack from 3 Colours Red
- Demob Happy
- Drill
- Dubstar (from Jesmond)
- Eric Burdon
- Geordie
- Goldie
- Hank Marvin of the Shadows
- Hellbastard
- Hurrah!
- INDIGØ
- Jade Thirlwall of Little Mix
- James Ray
- Jimmy Nail
- Kathryn Williams (originally from Liverpool), she is now based in Newcastle after studying at the Newcastle University.
- Knats
- Lanterns on the Lake
- The Lighthouse Family
- Lindisfarne
- Little Comets
- Loveable Wholes
- Mark Knopfler guitarist, singer, and founder member of Dire Straits. Although born in Glasgow, his family moved to Northumberland when he was young and he attended school in Newcastle.
- Matthew Healy of the alternative rock band the 1975. Although born in London, was brought up in Prudhoe
- Maxïmo Park
- The Motorettes
- Nadine Shah
- Near Life Experience
- Neil Tennant of the Pet Shop Boys (born in North Shields, schooled in Newcastle)
- The Orange Lights
- Peace Burial at Sea
- Penetration
- Perrie Edwards of Little Mix
- Phase, switched their base to Newcastle in 2013.
- Prelude, from Gateshead
- Punishment of Luxury
- Raven
- Richard Dawson
- Sam Fender
- lots of hands (Newcastle based duo)
- Sandhill
- Satan
- Sirens
- Spike
- Sting (from Wallsend)
- TCHOTCHKE
- Tygers of Pan Tang
- Venom
- volta
- Warfare
- The Wildhearts
- YFriday
- yourcodenameis:milo
- Zoviet France
