= Live Between the Earth & Clouds =

Live album by Antimatter
- Released: 2017
- Recorded: March 2016
- Venue: De Boerderij, Zoetermeer, Netherlands
- Label: Music in Stone
- Producer: Daniel Cardoso, Mick Moss

Antimatter chronology
Welcome to the Machine (2016)	Live Between the Earth & Clouds (2017)	Black Market Enlightenment (2018)

Professional ratings
Review scores
Source	Rating
Metal Hammer	4/5 stars
ROCK CULT	10/10 stars
Koid'9	4/5 stars

Live Between the Earth & Clouds is the first live DVD, and third live album, by the UK band Antimatter, released in 2017. The release is a two-disc format with Disc 1 being the DVD of the show, and Disc 2 being the live album of the same show

== Track listing ==
All tracks are written by Mick Moss except where noted

No.	Title	Length
1.	"Paranova"
2.	"Firewalking"
3.	"Black Eyed Man"
4.	"The Last Laugh"
5.	"Monochrome"
6.	"Uniformed & Black"
7.	"Over Your Shoulder"
8.	"Can Of Worms"
9.	"Leaving Eden"
10.	"Wide Awake in the Concrete Asylum"
11.	"The Parade"
12.	"Welcome to the Machine" (Roger Waters)
13.	"Stillborn Empires"

== Personnel ==
- Mick Moss – vocals, guitar, lead guitar
- Dave Hall – lead guitar, Ebow, Additional vocals
- Ste Hughes – bass
- Liam Edwards – drums
- Audio produced by Daniel Cardoso and Mick Moss
- Mastered by Daniel Cardoso
- Concert film directed by Adam Wright and Mick Moss
- Film authoring, grading and post-production by Tomfoolery Ltd
- Filmed and recorded before a live audience at De Boerderij, Zoetermeer, Netherlands, March 2016
- Photography by Cristel Brouwer
- Artwork, design and layout by Mick Moss for Music In Stone
