= The Eternal (band) =

Australian gothic/doom metal band

- Origin: Melbourne, Victoria, Australia
- Genres: Gothic metal, doom metal, progressive metal
- Years active: 2003–present
- Labels: Stay Metal, Amphead, Sombre Light, Firebox
- Members: Mark Kelson; Richie Poate; Niclas Etelävuori; Jan Rechberger
- Past members: Ando McDougall; Dave Langlands; Marty O'Shea; Martin Curtis-Powell; Brad Cook; Ryan Buesnel; Chris Burton; James Hunt; Chris Stevenson; Paul Tipping; Lincoln Bowen; Terry Vainoras
- Website: the-eternal.com

The Eternal are an Australian gothic and doom metal band formed in 2003 by Mark Kelson (ex-Cryptal Darkness) on guitar, vocals and keyboards. They are known for playing dark, melodic, doom metal with eastern and gothic influences.

== History ==
The Eternal were formed in Melbourne in mid-2003 by former members of doom metal act Cryptal Darkness. The founders were Ryan Buesnel on drums; Chris Burton on guitar; James Hunt on bass guitar; Mark Kelson on guitar and lead vocals; and Chris Stevenson on keyboards. Late that year, they signed a two-album deal with Firebox Records of Finland on the basis of their self-titled extended play. Their debut album for Firebox, The Sombre Light of Isolation, was released worldwide in June 2004. It gained positive reviews from United Kingdom-based magazine, Kerrang!, German-based Metal, Sweden's Metal Only and Lords of Metal in The Netherlands; as well as Australian media Full Strength and Loud!. Darren White (ex-Anathema/The Blood Divine) contributed guest vocals on the track, "Remembrance Scars".

The Sombre Light of Isolation was voted fifth best Australian release of 2005 by listeners of Australian national radio, Triple J's Full Metal Racket, while it was nominated as second best Australian album by the presenter. The band was listed in Kerrang! magazine's '50 Bands You Need to Know Right Now'. The Eternal completed two music videos, "Down" and "Crimson Sacrifice". In support of the album, they undertook the Sombre Light Tour of Australia, Hong Kong, UK and continental Europe including Finland, in late 2004. In 2005 Sombre Visions, which focuses on that tour, was released as a DVD on their own label, Sombre Light. It also included a documentary on the group and promotional videos. Upon return immediately set about writing material for their second album, Sleep of Reason.

Recorded early in 2005, Sleep of Reason extends The Eternal's sound from their debut work. It was produced and recorded by Endel Rivers at Palm Studios in Melbourne, and mastered by Mika Jussila (Amorphis, Nightwish, Therion) at Finnvox Studios in Helsinki. The album's sleeve-art was created by Travis Smith (Opeth, Katatonia, Anathema) based on the etching 'El sueño de la razon produce monstruos' by Francisco de Goya. Videos for 'Everlasting', 'A Soul Undone' and 'Hollow Inside' followed the release of the album.

In 2006, The Eternal landed the Australian national support slot for Finnish rockers HIM, which coincided with the Australian release of Sleep of Reason. These shows were shortly followed by six shows supporting renowned Swedish death/progressive metal band Opeth on their 'Ghost Reveries' Australian tour.

After touring Australia extensively for the release of Sleep of Reason and playing to well over 15,000 people in their home country, the band set off for their second tour of Europe in May 2007. The tour saw the band return to Portugal, Germany, Hungary, Belgium and the Netherlands. On their return home, the band went about completing and compiling three years worth of demo material for what would soon become Kartika.

The Eternal's 2008 album Kartika may be seen as the band's most diverse and ambitious album to date. Guests on the album include Duncan Patterson (ex-Anathema, Antimatter and Íon) on mandolin, Nicholas Albanis (Dandelion Wine) on hammered dulcimer and Russian songstress Emily A. Saaen to name a few.

Kartika was produced between December 2007 and May 2008, recorded at several studios in Australia including Mixmasters Studios, Adelaide and Palm Studios in Melbourne. It was mixed in Tallinn, Estonia by Endel Rivers at Palm Studios II and mastered at Crystal Mastering, Melbourne, Australia by John Ruberto.

January 2009 saw the departure of co-founding member Chris Stevenson for personal reasons. Chris stated 'The Eternal was basically my life for a good 5 years and I loved every single moment of it! It was also an extremely gruelling experience, which at times took its toll on me on a personal level'. The band continued on as a 3-piece.

The Eternal completed an extensive world tour in June 2009. The tour took the band through Australia, Japan, Europe, America, Canada and Mexico.

In November 2009, the band commenced work on their fourth album Under a New Sun, it was produced by Jeff Martin, singer of The Tea Party. The album saw The Eternal experimenting more with the rock and eastern elements of their sound. Following the release of 'Under A New Sun' the band completed an Australian and New Zealand Tour.

In 2011, the band enlisted second guitar player Brad Cook, a long time fixture in the Melbourne scene. The addition of Brad to the line-up helped to refocus the band and encourage them to commence work on the band's fifth studio album, When The Circle of Light Begins to Fade (October 2013). Martin Curtis-Powell (Cradle of Filth, My Dying Bride, Anathema) also stepped in to contribute keyboards on the album.

Following the release of When The Circle of Light Begins to Fade the band toured Australia to celebrate their 10-year anniversary and also released a free EP entitled Sombre Light 2014 – 10th Anniversary E.P which contained re-recordings of material from their debut album The Sombre Light of Isolation. This release was also followed by national tours with Anathema, Amorphis and Uriah Heep.

The band released Circle of Live, a live album/DVD in March 2015 which was also recorded on the band's 10th Anniversary tour in 2013. The band parted ways with guitarist Brad Cook in late 2015 and Martin Curtis-Powell has since become a full-time member of the band.

In March 2016, The Eternal entered Kelsonic Studios (with singer/guitarist Mark Kelson handling production) to record their 6th full-length album. The album, titled Waiting for the Endless Dawn was released in August 2018.

On 11 April 2024, the band announced their seventh studio album, Skinwalker, which was released on 28 June.

== Members ==
Current members

- Mark Kelson – guitar, vocals, keyboards (2003–present)
- Richie Poate – guitar (2016–present)
- Jan Rechberger – drums (2020–present)
- Niclas Etelävuori – bass (2021–present)

Former members

- Marty O'Shea – drums (2004–2018)
- Brad Cook – guitar (2011–2015)
- Martin Powell – keyboards (2012–2018)
- Chris Stevenson – keyboards (2003–2009)
- Chris Burton – guitar (2003–2004)
- Ryan Buesnel – drums (2003–2004)
- Paul Tipping – bass (2003)
- James Hunt – bass (2003–2006)
- Lincoln Bowen – guitar (2005–2006)
- Terry Vainoras – guitar (2007–2009)
- Maria Ilmoniemi – keyboards (2009–2012)
- Ando McDougall – drums (2018–2019)
- Dave Langlands – bass (2008–2021)

Touring musicians

- Matt Castles – guitar (2004 European Tour)

Timeline

== Discography ==
=== Albums ===
- The Sombre Light of Isolation (2004)
- Sleep of Reason (2005)
- Kartika (2008)
- Under a New Sun (2011)
- When the Circle of Light Begins to Fade (2013)
- Waiting for the Endless Dawn (2018)
- Skinwalker (2024)
- Obscured Horizons (2026)

=== DVDs ===
- Sombre Visions (2005) (Internet Only – Out of Print)
- A Fleeting Glance (2006) (Internet Only – Out of Print)
- Kartika World Tour 2009 (2010) (Internet Only – Out of Print)

=== Other releases ===
- Promo 2003 (2003)
- Keep on Dooming in the Free World (2005)
- Black Box e-anthology (2008)

=== Singles ===
- "Under a New Sun" (November 2010)
- "Beneath These Waves" (June 2013)
- "In The Lilac Dusk" (June 2018)
- "Deathlike Silence" (April 2024)
- "Skinwalker" (May 2024)
- "When The Fire Dies" (June 2024)

== See also ==
- Cryptal Darkness
