= Cryptal Darkness =

Australian doom metal band (1993–2002)

- Origin: Melbourne, Australia
- Genre: Doom metal
- Years active: 1993–2002
- Label: Icon
- Spinoffs: The Eternal
- Past members: Mark Kelson; Alexander O'Neil; Chris Burton; Luke Wong; Sean Hinds; Martin Powell; Jade Von Nagy; Paul Venables; Terry Vainoras; Geoff Kloprogge

Cryptal Darkness were an Australian doom metal band from Melbourne featuring Mark Kelson, now of The Eternal and InSomnius Dei and for a short period, former My Dying Bride/Cradle of Filth member, Martin Powell.

== History ==
Cryptal Darkness started life as a grindcore/death metal band, that later changed styles and became doom metal band. With the line up of Mark Kelson, Oneil Alexander (drums), Geoff Kloprogge (vocals, guitar) and Jade Von Nagy (bass) the band released a four track single, Descend into Thy Grave and shortly thereafter the debut album Endless Tears, which has been re-released for international distribution. An opening slot at the 1997 Metal for the Brain festival raised awareness of the band somewhat, and much of 1998 was spent working on new material. Former Paramaecium guitarist Chris Burton replaced Kloprogge in 1997 and after some time as a temporary member, Luke Wong finally joined as full-time bassist mid-1998. Around the same time the band started working with ex-My Dying Bride keyboards player Martin Powell, who came to Australia to join the band and record They Whispered You Had Risen, which displays a more Gothic character than earlier work. Cryptal Darkness had plans to tour Europe in late 2000, but this seems to have not occurred. Kelson has also featured in the Paramaecium line-up and Alexander played drums for Vomitorial Corpulence; both were also members of Desolate Eternity. In early 2003 the band split up and Kelson and Burton formed The Eternal. Kelson is also involved with InSomnius Dei with fellow Cryptal Darkness alumni, Terry Vainoras.

== Members ==
Last Known Lineup

- Mark Kelson – guitars (1995–2002), vocals (1996–2002), keyboards (1996) (ex-Paramaecium)
- Chris Burton – guitar (1997–2002) (ex-Paramecium)
- Oneil Alexander – drums (1993–2002) (ex-Vomitorial Corpulence, ex-Vomoth)
- Luke Wong – bass (1996–2002)
- Sean Hinds – keyboards (2000–2002)

Former

- Martin Powell – violin, keyboards (1999–2000) (ex-My Dying Bride, ex-Cradle of Filth)
- Terry Vainoras – keyboards (1997)
- Geoff Kloprogge – guitar, vocals (1993–1996)
- Jade Von Nagy – bass (1996)
- Paul Venables – bass (1993–1996)

Timeline

== Discography ==
- Chamber of Gore (EP) (Independent Release)
- Endless Tears (1996/Obscure)
- "Descend Into Thy Grave" (Single) (1996/Obscure)
- The Coldest Winter (EP) (1999/Icon)
- They Whispered You Had Risen (1999/Icon)
- Chapter II – The Fallen (2000/Icon)
