= Leaving Eden (Antimatter album) =

Studio album by Antimatter
- Released: 13 April 2007
- Genre: Alternative rock
- Label: Prophecy Productions
- Producer: Mick Moss

Antimatter chronology
| Planetary Confinement (2005) | Leaving Eden (2007) | Live@An Club (2009) |

Professional ratings
Review scores
| Source | Rating |
|---|---|
| DPRP | 8.5/10 stars |

Leaving Eden is the fourth album by the UK band Antimatter. It was released on 13 April 2007. It also marks the first Antimatter album to be written entirely by Mick Moss since the departure of Duncan Patterson two years earlier.

== Promo Video ==
A promo video for the song 'Conspire' was made by Polish artists Krzysztof Baran, Kasper Grubba and Andrzej Szych. The four and a half minute film consisted of over 3,000 hand-painted watercolour images by Krzysztof Baran, a task which took 6 months to complete. The video went on to win a distinction at the Camera Action Festival in Lodz, Poland, in 2011, and was shown at Supertoon Animation Festival in the Best Music Videos category next to works by Depeche Mode and Coldplay.

== Track listing ==
All songs written by Mick Moss

| No. | Title | Length |
|---|---|---|
| 1. | "Redemption" | 6:07 |
| 2. | "Another Face in a Window" | 7:00 |
| 3. | "Ghosts" | 4:37 |
| 4. | "The Freak Show" | 5:11 |
| 5. | "Landlocked" | 4:00 |
| 6. | "Conspire" | 4:12 |
| 7. | "Leaving Eden" | 5:50 |
| 8. | "The Immaculate Misconception" | 5:11 |
| 9. | "Fighting for a Lost Cause" | 5:36 |
| Total length: | | 47:14 |

== Credits ==
- Music and lyrics: Mick Moss
- Mick Moss (Vocals, Acoustic Guitar, Electric Guitar, Organ, Electric Piano, Synths)
- Guest appearances: Danny Cavanagh (Lead Guitar, Piano) Ste Hughes (Bass), Rachel Brewster (Violin), Chris Phillips (Drums)
- Artwork: Adrian Owens
