= The Aftermath (Irish band) =

Irish mod/pop rock band (2006– )

- Origin: Mullingar, Ireland
- Genres: Mod, new wave, indie rock, pop rock
- Years active: 2006 – present
- Label: Live Transmission Records
- Members: Johnny Cronin; Justin McNabb; Martin Gray; Ger Eaton; Michael Cronin
- Website: myspace.com/theaftermathband (defunct)

The Aftermath are an Irish mod/pop rock band, currently based in Mullingar. They are composed of brothers Johnny (guitar, keys, vocals) and Michael Cronin (drums, percussion, samples, vocals), both of whom are originally from Longford but raised in Leeds, as well as Mullingar guitarist, Justin McNabb and bassist Martin Gray. The Aftermath released their debut album, Friendlier Up Here on 25 April 2008. They have had three singles enter the Irish Singles Chart, all inside the Top 20; "One is Fun/Are You Not?" spent two weeks in the chart and peaked at number eleven, "Hollywood Remake/Need" also spent two weeks in the chart and peaked at number nineteen, whilst latest single "All I Want is For You to Be Happy" spent a week in the chart at number thirteen. All this led to the band being voted at number nine in the "Most Promising for 2007" category in the Hot Press Readers Poll.

The Aftermath have provided support for Razorlight, The Streets, The Mission and The Frames on Irish and European dates. They have played a double-headliner in Whelan's, Dublin with New York City outfit Arckid, who feature Liv Tyler’s husband Royston Langdon on bass and lead vocals. Eight weeks of 2006 were spent in BBC Radio 1 DJ Chris Moyles's Top Unsigned Bands Chart and they are still the only Irish band to have featured in the Tastemakers Chart. Festival appearances include Electric Picnic, Indie-pendence, Le Chéile and Hard Working Class Heroes. The Aftermath are named after the Cronins favourite album by The Rolling Stones. They are signed to the Live Transmission label.

== Career ==
=== Debut album ===
The band members moved to France to work with Karl and Dave Odlum. Acquaintances from their time touring the UK helped the band - Phil Vinyl (Placebo, Elastica and Pulp) offered producer strokes, Ger McDonald (Travis and U2) performed mixing duties, Steve Wickham of The Waterboys and Damien Rice's cellist Vyvienne Long assisted as did former Anathema bassist, Duncan Patterson and Paul Weller's keyboardist Helen Turner who continues to play live with the band. Words of wisdom were given by the legendary producer Mike Hedges and Irish Jack Lyons, an old associate of The Who and there were contributions from Terry Edwards, well known for working with Tindersticks, whom the band befriended when they supported Gallon Drunk and The Ukrainians. The band have also used fan footage from a free show in Mullingar to create a video for their 2008 single "Northern Lingerie".

=== 2007 bus crash ===
The Aftermath were involved in a near-fatal bus crash on 13 July 2007. The crash, which took place on a Friday night, happened just outside the village of Kilbeggan in County Westmeath. All four members of the band and two members of their crew were treated for injuries after the accident. The band were in the middle of an extensive Irish tour at the time in support of their "All I Want For You is to Be Happy" single.

In the aftermath, Johnny Cronin said:

"We thought we were goners, we really thought that this was it - game over. It was like being in a tumble drier - only worse. It¹s a miracle we all made it out alive."

=== 2009 ===
On 3 April 2009, The Aftermath played their first UK show of the year at the Brudenell Social Club in Leeds. The show was filmed and later released on DVD. On 1 May 2009, a new single, "Northern Lingerie", was released. The song was remastered by John Davis in London's mastering division of Metropolis Group, Metropolis Mastering. The Aftermath will embark on an Irish tour across May and June 2009. The Aftermath also acted as The Word's house band at Electric Picnic 2009. They performed another Irish tour in late 2009.

Late 2009 saw the release as a single of a cover version of Frankie Goes to Hollywood's "The Power of Love", alongside an Irish tour of the West and Midlands regions in late 2009.

=== 2010 ===
They played a series of shows across Ireland in June and July 2010.

== Discography ==
The Aftermath discography
- Studio albums: 1
- Singles: 3

=== Studio albums ===
Year	Album details	Peak chart positions
Year	Album details	IRL
2008	Friendlier Up Here: Released: April 25, 2008; Label: Live Transmission; Formats: CD, Download	26
"—" denotes a title that did not chart.

=== Singles ===
Year	Title	Peak chart position	Album
Year	Title	IRL	Album
2006	"One Is Fun/Are You Not"	11	Friendlier Up Here
2006	"Hollywood Remake/Need"	19	Friendlier Up Here
2007	"All I Want is For You to Be Happy"	13	Friendlier Up Here
2008	"Are You Not Wanting Me Yet?"		Friendlier Up Here
2009	"The Power Of Love" (Frankie Goes To Hollywood cover)		Single
2010	"Northern Lingerie"		Friendlier Up Here
2011	"Lost Possession/Electrolenza"		Single
2012	"In Loneliness Lives Love"		Single
2012	"The Rockier Road To Poland" (with Shane MacGowan & Friends)		Single
"—" denotes a title that did not chart.
