= Live @ An Club =

Live album by Antimatter
- Released: 2009
- Recorded: An Club, Athens, Greece, 2007
- Label: Worldwide: Music In Stone
- Producer: Mick Moss

Antimatter chronology
Leaving Eden (2007)	Live @ An Club (2009)	Alternative Matter (2010)

Live @ An Club is the second live album by the UK band, Antimatter, released in 2009.

== Track listing ==
All songs written by Mick Moss except where stated

No.	Title	Length
1.	"Over Your Shoulder"
2.	"Black Sun" (Dead Can Dance)
3.	"In Stone"
4.	"Working Class Hero" (John Lennon)
5.	"Leaving Eden"
6.	"Hope" (Roy Harper)
7.	"Saviour"
8.	"Legions"
9.	"The Power Of Love" (Frankie Goes To Hollywood)

== Credits ==
- Acoustic guitar/vocals: Mick Moss (1,2,3,4,5,6,7,8,9)
- Acoustic guitar: Danny Cavanagh (1,2,3,7,8,9)
- Additional vocals: Pete Gilchrist (1,2,3,4,5,6,7,8)
- Producer: Mick Moss
- Engineer: Chris Ntaskas
- Masterer: Les Smith
- Cover art: Mick Moss
