= Planetary Confinement =

Studio album by Antimatter
- Released: 2005
- Recorded: Studio 33, Liverpool, July 2004; Provisional Ireland, Neuilly France late 2004
- Genre: Acoustic rock
- Label: Prophecy Productions
- Producer: Mick Moss, Duncan Patterson, Ronnie O'Keefe, Alex Mazarguil

Antimatter chronology
Lights Out (2003)	Planetary Confinement (2005)	Leaving Eden (2007)

Professional ratings
Review scores
Source	Rating
Allmusic	3.5/5 stars

Planetary Confinement is the third album by the UK band Antimatter, released in 2005.

== Track listing ==
No.	Title	Length
1.	"Planetary Confinement" (D.Patterson)	1:33
2.	"The Weight of the World" (M.Moss)	4:45
3.	"Line of Fire" (D.Patterson)	6:28
4.	"Epitaph" (M.Moss)	4:11
5.	"Mr. White" (Trouble)	4:07
6.	"A Portrait of the Young Man as an Artist" (M.Moss)	4:54
7.	"Relapse" (D.Patterson)	5:03
8.	"Legions" (M.Moss)	7:24
9.	"Eternity Part 24" (D.Patterson)	8:45

== Credits ==
English Sessions

- The Weight of the World
- Epitaph
- A Portrait of the Young Man As An Artist
- Legions

An acoustic performance recorded in Studio 33, Liverpool, July 2004. All songs and orchestral arrangements by Mick Moss

- Mick Moss - Acoustic guitars, Vocals
- Rachel Brewster - Violins
- Stephen Hughes - Bass Guitar
- Chris Phillips - Drums
- Sue Marshall - Additional vocals on 'Legions'

Irish Sessions

- Planetary Confinement
- Line of Fire
- Mr. White
- Relapse
- Eternity part 24

All songs by Duncan Patterson, except 'Mr. White' by Trouble

- Duncan Patterson - piano, acoustic guitars, bass guitar, keyboards
- Amélie Festa - vocals
- Mehdi Messouci - additional keyboards on 'Relapse'
- Barry Whyte - lead guitar
- Alex Mazarguil - djembe
- Michael Cronin - drums
- Album mastered at Counterpoint Studio by Gianni Skolnick
- Cover design by Mick Moss from an original photograph by Brandon Stone
- Inner photos by Chris Slack
- Design by Mick Moss
- Layout by Paul Kuhr

== Notes ==
- "Mr White" was originally performed by the doom metal band Trouble.
- "Eternity Part 24" is a continuation of the tracks "Eternity Part I", "Eternity Part II", and "Eternity Part III", the three of which appear on Eternity, an album released by Patterson's previous band Anathema.
