= Who Disturbs the Water =

Who Disturbs The Water

Studio album by Vic Anselmo
- Released: 2015
- Genre: Pop, folk, world music
- Label: Agua Recordings
- Producer: Joost van den Broek

Vic Anselmo chronology
In My Fragile (2008)	Who Disturbs The Water (2015)

Who Disturbs The Water is an album written by Vic Anselmo. It was released in 2015.

== Track listing ==
1. "Another Train" 3:55
2. "Flawless" 3:55
3. "Say You" 3:53
4. "Who Disturbs The Water" 3:15
5. "Holy Ground" 3:51
6. "Every Time You Come Around" 2:56
7. "Cody" 3:57
8. "My Every Breath" 4:18
9. "Daylight" 3:59
10. "Dream" 2:28
