= Saviour (album) =

Studio album by Antimatter
- Released: 4 September 2001
- Recorded: September 2000
- Genres: Alternative rock, trip hop, downtempo, ambient, gothic rock
- Length: 44:13
- Labels: Worldwide: Icon Records (original release); Worldwide: Prophecy Productions (reissue); United States: The End Records; Ireland: Strangelight Records; Russia: Irond Records; Poland: Metal Mind Records
- Producers: Duncan Patterson, Mags

Antimatter chronology
Saviour (2001)	Lights Out (2003)

Professional ratings
Review scores
Source	Rating
Allmusic	4/5 stars

Saviour is the debut album by the UK band, Antimatter, released in 2001.

== Track listing ==
No.	Title	Length
1.	"Saviour" (M.Moss)	3:07
2.	"Holocaust" (D.Patterson)	4:27
3.	"Over Your Shoulder" (M.Moss)	4:40
4.	"Psalms" (M.Moss)	3:41
5.	"God Is Coming" (D.Patterson)	5:28
6.	"Angelic" (M.Moss, D.Patterson)	4:34
7.	"Flowers" (D.Patterson)	5:11
8.	"The Last Laugh" (M.Moss)	5:06
9.	"Going Nowhere" (D.Patterson)	7:59
Total length:		44:13

American release bonus tracks
No.	Title	Length
10.	"Over Your Shoulder (Acoustic)"	3:21
11.	"Flowers (Acoustic)"	4:31
12.	"The Last Laugh (Acoustic)"	4:00
Total length:		52:05

== Credits ==
- Duncan Patterson - bass guitar, acoustic guitar, electric guitar, keyboards, programming
- Mick Moss - bass guitar, acoustic guitar, electric guitar, keyboards, vocals
- Michelle Richfield - guest vocals on tracks 1, 2, 3, 4, 6, 8
- Hayley Windsor - guest vocals on tracks 5, 6, 7, 9
- Brian Moss - sampling
- Les Smith - sampling
- James SK Wān – bamboo flute
- Mags - lead guitar on "Going Nowhere"
- Mark Kelson - artwork
