= Fear of a Unique Identity =

Studio album by Antimatter
- Released: 23 November 2012
- Genre: Alternative rock, electronic rock
- Label: Prophecy Productions
- Producer: Al Groves, Mick Moss

Antimatter chronology
Alternative Matter (2010)	Fear of a Unique Identity (2012)	The Judas Table (2015)

Professional ratings
Review scores
Source	Rating
Metal Hammer	3.5/5 stars

Fear of a Unique Identity is the fifth album by the UK band Antimatter.

== Track listing ==
All songs written by Mick Moss

No.	Title	Length
1.	"Paranova"	6:06
2.	"Monochrome"	5:24
3.	"Fear of a Unique Identity"	5:28
4.	"Firewalking"	8:04
5.	"Here Come the Men"	5:06
6.	"Uniformed & Black"	4:19
7.	"Wide Awake in the Concrete Asylum"	4:38
8.	"The Parade"	4:37
9.	"A Place in the Sun"	5:40
Total length:		49:22

Digipack Bonus Tracks (PRO 127-2)

No.	Title	Length
10.	"Fear of a Unique Identity (Acoustic Mix)"	4:37
11.	"Monochrome (Demo)"	5:40

Artbook (2CD/1DVD) Bonus Tracks (PRO 127 LU) DISC TWO - CD

No.	Title	Length
1.	"The Parade (Remix)"	4:25
2.	"Fear of a Unique Identity (Acoustic Mix)"	4:37
3.	"Here Come the Men (Violin Mix)"	4:47
4.	"Firewalking (Remix)"	5:24
5.	"A Place in the Sun (Demo)"	3:32
6.	"Monochrome (Demo)"	5:40

Artbook (2CD/1DVD) Bonus Tracks (PRO 127 LU) DISC THREE - DVD

No.	Title	Length
1.	"Uniformed and Black (Bonus Video)"	4:28

== Credits ==
- Music and lyrics: Mick Moss
- Members: Mick Moss (vocals, lead guitar, acoustic and electric guitars, bass guitar, synthesizers, piano, programming, samples, producer, mixer)
- Guest appearances: Colin Fromont (drums), Vic Anselmo (vocals), David Hall (violin)
- Mastering Engineer: Maor Appelbaum

== Video ==
An official video for "Uniformed and Black" written by Mick Moss and directed by Mehdi Messouci (VÆV) was released prior to the album release.
