= Alternative 4 =

Band formed by Duncan Patterson

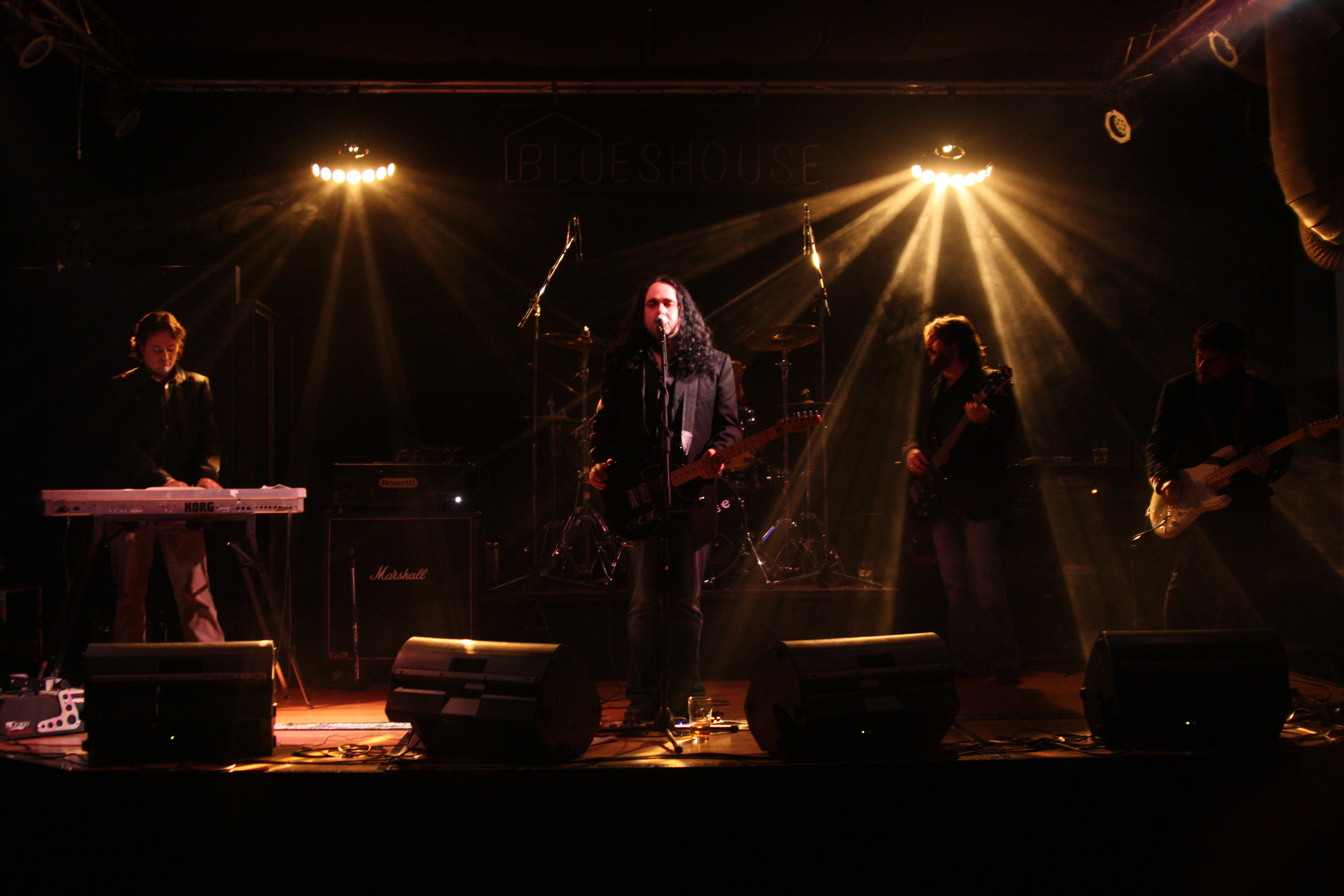
- Alternative 4 performing in 2011

Background information
- Origin: UK
- Genres: Avant-garde rock, ambient, gothic rock
- Years active: 2011–present
- Labels: Prophecy, Avantgarde Music, Icarus Music
- Members: Duncan Patterson; Simon Flatley; Mauro Frison
- Website: alternative4.co.uk

Alternative 4 is a band formed by Duncan Patterson, known for his work with Antimatter, Íon, and Anathema.

The band's name is taken from the Anathema album Alternative 4, an album written largely by Patterson, whose title in turn derives from the Leslie Watkins book Alternative 3.

== Label ==
Alternative 4 signed to Avantgarde Music in 2011 with the debut album The Brink released in late 2011. In March 2012, they signed a long term deal with German label Prophecy Productions, who subsequently re-released The Brink later that same year.

The second album titled The Obscurants was released in 2014. A special double-CD edition contains extra tracks from the same session, a new recording of Patterson's song "Reality Clash" originally recorded during his tenure in Antimatter, as well as remixes from Ars Arcanum, 36 Floors, Nîm, Spermblaster and VÆV.

== Discography ==
- The Brink (Avantgarde Music/Prophecy Productions, 2011)
- The Obscurants (Prophecy Productions 2014)

== Videos ==
- "False Light" (directed by Luís Rolo)
- "Underlooked" (directed by Mehdi Messouci)
- "Lifeline" (directed by Mehdi Messouci)
