= Bridie Jackson and the Arbour =

English contemporary folk/acoustic band

- Origin: Newcastle upon Tyne, United Kingdom
- Genres: Contemporary folk, acoustic
- Labels: Debt Records, Amazing Record Co.
- Members: Bridie Jackson; Carol Bowden; Jenny Nendick; Rachel Cross
- Website: www.bridieandthearbour.com

Bridie Jackson and The Arbour were a four-piece contemporary folk/acoustic band based in Newcastle upon Tyne, England. Their debut album, Bitter Lullabies was released in January 2012 to a sold-out album launch at The Sage Gateshead (Hall Two). They partnered with Debt Records to release two singles in 2013: the double A-Side Scarecrow / All You Love Is All You Are in February, and Prolong in June.

The band's second album, New Skin, was released on 5 May 2014.

They were the winners of the Glastonbury Festival Emerging Talent Competition 2013 and performed five times over the weekend on different stages including the Acoustic, Avalon and Bandstand stages.

The band has received play on BBC Radio One, Radio Two, Radio Three and Radio 6 Music, and also on Amazing Radio. They have featured live in session on BBC Radio 4's Loose Ends show with Clive Anderson, BBC Radio 3's In Tune, for Tom Robinson on BBC Radio 6 Music, and on Dermot O'Leary's show on Radio Two.

In February 2013 they were awarded an Arts Council England grant for their Music In Museums project with events running in Summer 2013. In the same year, they also received a Musician's Benevolent Fund Emerging Excellence Award and won a City Music Foundation award.

In the summer of 2013, they were featured as The Guardian's New Band Up North, and in The Daily Telegraph's New Faces column.

In 2014, Jackson was commissioned to write the music for a new opera for Streetwise Opera.

In February 2015, Bridie Jackson and The Arbour received the Women Make Music award from the PRS for Music Foundation.

In April 2015, the band released a new single, Far From The Tree, and donated some of the proceeds to the charity The Epilepsy Society.

Prior to establishing the four-piece line-up, Jackson performed regularly as a solo artist and with a changing collective of musicians, under a variety of band names. Musicians who performed regularly with Jackson, and featured on early recordings included: Nathalie Stern, Tom Cronin, Sofia De Castro, Alexandra Healy, Ed Alcroft and Eleanor Mooney.

In July 2016, the band announced their break-up via their website.
