= Friendlier Up Here =

Studio album by The Aftermath
- Released: 25 April 2008
- Genres: Mod, new wave, indie rock, pop rock
- Length: 47:10
- Label: Live Transmission
- Producer: Phil Vinyl

Singles from Friendlier Up Here
- 1. "One Is Fun/Are You Not" Released: 2006; 2. "Hollywood Remake/Need" Released: 2006; 3. "All I Want is For You to Be Happy" Released: 2007

Friendlier Up Here is the debut studio album by the Irish mod/pop rock quartet, The Aftermath. It was released on 25 April 2008.

The album featured three singles which had previously entered the Irish Singles Chart, all inside the Top 20; "One is Fun/Are You Not?" spent two weeks in the chart and peaked at #11, "Hollywood Remake/Need" also spent two weeks in the chart and peaked at #19 whilst latest single "All I Want is For You to Be Happy" spent a week in the chart at #13. The lead single was the album's opener "Are You Not Wanting Me Yet?".

The title comes from a lyric in the song "Northern Lingerie", which was later released as a single. It refers to what band member Johnny Cronin called "a safer zone for your listening pleasure" and is "a big LSD reference too" in homage to Echo & the Bunnymen.

== Track listing ==
All songs written by The Aftermath.

No.	Title	Length
1.	"Are you not wanting me yet?"	3:51
2.	"I Wish my Love Would Die"	2:56
3.	"Northern Lingerie"	3:49
4.	"All I Want Is For You To Be Happy"	5:47
5.	"One Is Fun"	3:23
6.	"Overlooking Paris"	2:28
7.	"Up & Down with The Aftermath"	0:41
8.	"Need"	2:24
9.	"There's A Darkness"	3:38
10.	"Hollywood Remake"	2:28
11.	"Dejection"	2:53
12.	"Joyful Mystery"	5:02
13.	"Six Days To Saturday"	3:25
14.	"Monsters"	7:45
Total length:		47:10

== Singles ==
Year	Title	Peak chart position
Year	Title	IRL
2006	"One Is Fun/Are You Not"	11
2006	"Hollywood Remake/Need"	19
2007	"All I Want is For You to Be Happy"	13
"—" denotes a title that did not chart.

== Personnel ==
- Johnny Cronin - Lead vocals, rhythm guitar
- Justin McNabb - Lead guitar
- Martin Gray - Bass, backing vocals
- Michael Cronin - Drums, backing vocals
