= The Judas Table =

Studio album by Antimatter
- Released: 9 October 2015
- Genre: Progressive rock, hard rock
- Label: Prophecy Productions
- Producer: Daniel Cardoso, Mick Moss

Antimatter chronology
| Fear Of A Unique Identity (2012) | The Judas Table (2015) | Welcome To The Machine (2016) |

Professional ratings
Review scores
| Source | Rating |
|---|---|
| DPRP | 10/10 stars |
| Progressive Music Planet | 9/10 stars |

The Judas Table is the sixth album by the UK band Antimatter. It was released on 9 October 2015. In January 2020, The Judas Table was voted the number 1 'Album of the Decade' (2010's) by Dead Rhetoric's David E. Gehlke as well as being among the 'Top 25 Progressive Metal Albums Of The Decade' by Dutch Progressive Rock Page's Andy Read

== Track listing ==
All songs written by Mick Moss

| No. | Title | Length |
|---|---|---|
| 1. | "Black Eyed Man" | 6:24 |
| 2. | "Killer" | 5:13 |
| 3. | "Comrades" | 4:58 |
| 4. | "Stillborn Empires" | 7:20 |
| 5. | "Little Piggy" | 6:44 |
| 6. | "Hole" | 5:03 |
| 7. | "Can of Worms" | 5:37 |
| 8. | "Integrity" | 6:06 |
| 9. | "The Judas Table" | 6:37 |
| 10. | "Goodbye" | 2:44 |

== Credits ==
- Music and lyrics: Mick Moss – lead vocals, solo & electric guitar, keyboards and samples
- Guest appearances: Ste Hughes (Bass), Rachel Brewster (Violin), Jenny O'Connor (Additional Vocals) and Liam Edwards (Drums)
- Artwork: Mario Nevada
