= Lights Out (Antimatter album) =

Studio album by Antimatter
- Released: June 24, 2003
- Recorded: Sun Studios, Dublin, January 2003
- Genre: Post-rock, gothic rock, trip hop, downtempo, ambient
- Length: 49:47
- Label: Worldwide: Prophecy; United States: The End Records; Ireland: Strangelight Records; Argentina: Icarus Music
- Producer: Mick Moss, Duncan Patterson, Stefano Soffia

Antimatter chronology
Saviour (2001)	Lights Out (2003)	Planetary Confinement (2005)

Professional ratings
Review scores
Source	Rating
Allmusic	4.5/5 stars

Lights Out is the second album by the UK band, Antimatter, released in 2003.

The album is the namesake of the Svalbard song "Lights Out", from their fourth album The Weight of the Mask (2023).

== Track listing ==
No.	Title	Length
1.	"Lights Out" (D.Patterson)	4:05
2.	"Everything You Know Is Wrong" (M.Moss)	4:03
3.	"The Art of a Soft Landing" (M.Moss)	4:29
4.	"Expire" (D.Patterson)	7:59
5.	"In Stone" (M.Moss)	7:49
6.	"Reality Clash" (D.Patterson)	7:45
7.	"Dream" (M.Moss)	5:54
8.	"Terminal" (D.Patterson)	7:43
Total length:		49:47

2006 reissue bonus track
No.	Title	Length
9.	"Everything You Know Is Wrong [Acoustic]"	2:55
Total length:		52:43

== Credits ==
- Duncan Patterson - bass guitar, acoustic guitar, electric guitar, keyboards, programming, artwork, production, vocals
- Mick Moss - bass guitar, acoustic guitar, electric guitar, keyboards, production, vocals
- Hayley Windsor - guest vocals on tracks 1, 2, 3
- Michelle Richfield - guest vocals on tracks 4, 5, 7
- James SK Wān – bamboo flute
- Jamie Cavanagh - additional percussion:
- Stefano Soffia - production
- Stefano Soffia - mixing engineer
- Jamie Cavanagh - additional mixing
- Fergal Davis - mastering
- Adrian Owens - artwork and layout designer
