= Mick Moss =

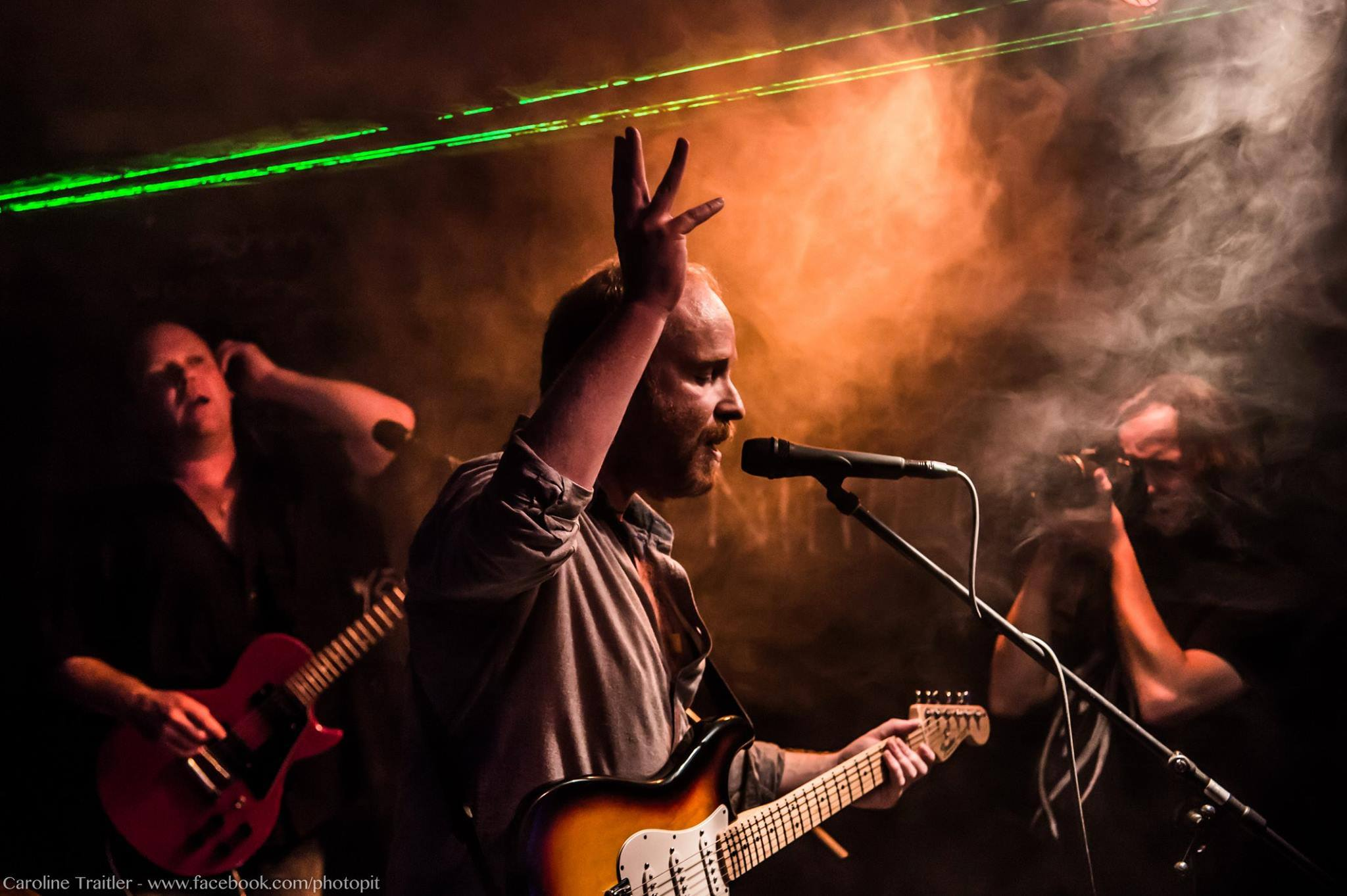
- Mick Moss Live

Background information
- Born: 8 August 1975 (age 51); London, England
- Occupation: Musician
- Instruments: Vocals, guitar, bass, keyboards
- Years active: 1990–present

Mick Moss (8 August 1975) is an English singer/songwriter. He is best known for his role in the band Antimatter, as well as being co-vocalist on the Number 1 single 'Broken Smile' (The Beautified Project).

== Musical history ==
Moss began writing music for a solo career in 1995 after numerous disappointments with previous bands, the idea being that no longer could a key member pull out leaving the current project in ruins.

From 96 to 98 the solo project went through numerous name changes, from 'The Reptile Brain', to 'Heavy Soul' and eventually 'Cloud One'. The style of music early on was instrumental with a strong leaning towards rhythmic psychedelic rock/trance. The addition of vocals to Moss's abilities in 1996 led to a shift in musical direction, where the writing turned to dark, melodic acoustic rock. During this period he wrote and recorded key tracks 'Over Your Shoulder', 'Saviour', 'Too Late' and 'Angel' (later re-titled to 'Angelic').

Antimatter was formed in 1998 when Duncan Patterson (then of Anathema) approached Moss to record an album with him after hearing Moss's demos which bore a striking resemblance to his own newer material on Anathema's 'Alternative 4' album (neither party had heard the others latest material).

The project was titled 'Antimatter' by Patterson, and would record their debut album in 2000. The album 'Saviour' featured an even split of songs written separately by Patterson and Moss. This method of writing alone and then compiling completed songs into one album would continue for the course of Patterson's involvement in the project.

Patterson decided he'd had enough of Antimatter after the release of the third album 'Planetary Confinement'. Due to the non-collaborative nature of the previous albums, Moss (with Patterson's blessing) continued with the projects name, writing and releasing the entirety of the fourth album, 'Leaving Eden', and continuing to tour performing Antimatter songs of his own composition.

In 2008, Mick established his own record label 'Music in Stone', releasing Antimatter's Live@An Club.

From 2009 – 2010 Moss compiled the 3CD/DVD, 100 page artbook 'Alternative Matter', producing the 30 minute documentary 'The Small Yesterdays'.

== Discography ==
2002 – Antimatter – Saviour
2003 – Antimatter – Lights Out
2003 – Antimatter – Live @ K13
2004 – V/A – The Lotus Eaters, A Tribute To Dead Can Dance
2004 – Antimatter – Unreleased 98-03 (Internet Release only)
2005 – Antimatter – Planetary Confinement
2007 – Antimatter – Leaving Eden
2009 – The Last Embrace – Aerial
2009 – Antimatter – Live @ An Club
2010 – Antimatter – Alternative Matter CD/DVD
2012 – Fourteen Twentysix – In Halflight Our Soul Glows
2012 – The Beautified Project – Broken Smile (Single)
2012 – Antimatter – Fear of a Unique Identity
2012 – The Beautified Project – Unplugged at Puppet Theater
2013 – Eudaimony – Futile
2013 – The Beautified Project – United We Fall
2013 – Tim Fromont Placenti – Original Sadtrack From The Cinnamon Screen
2014 – Antimatter – Too Late (Single)
2014 – Sleeping Pulse – Under The Same Sky
2015 – Antimatter – Timeline (Compilation)
2015 – Antimatter – The Judas Table
2016 – Antimatter – Welcome to the Machine (Single)
2016 – Trees of Eternity – Hour of the Nightingale
2017 – Antimatter – Live Between The Earth & Clouds DVD/CD
2017 – Painted Black – Raging Light
2017 – Antimatter – Leaving Eden (10th Anniversary 2-Disc Edition)
2018 – Gleb Kolyadin – Gleb Kolyadin
2018 – Antimatter – Black Market Enlightenment
2018 – Antimatter – Between The Atoms (Single)
2018 – The Beautified Project – Black Wooden Nest (Single)
2019 – Antimatter – An Epitaph
2020 – Oceans of Slumber – Oceans of Slumber
2021 – Michał Łapaj – Are You There
2021 – Clouds – Despartire
2022 – Antimatter – A Profusion of Thought
2024 – Marjana Semkina – Sirin

== Videography ==
2008 – Antimatter – Epitaph (Songwriter) (Vocalist)
2009 – Antimatter – Conspire (Songwriter) (Vocalist)
2010 – Antimatter – The Small Yesterdays (Writer) (Producer) (Director) (Videographer)
2011 – The Beautified Project – Broken Smile (Actor) (Vocalist)
2012 – Antimatter – Uniformed & Black (Actor) (Writer) (Songwriter) (Vocalist)
2014 – Sleeping Pulse – War (Actor) (Writer) (Co-Songwriter) (Vocalist)
2015 – Antimatter – Stillborn Empires (Actor) (Songwriter) (Vocalist)
2018 – The Beautified Project – Black Wooden Nest (Actor) (Vocalist)
2017 – Antimatter – Live Between The Earth & Clouds (Performer) (co-director)
2018 – Antimatter – The Third Arm (Actor) (Writer) (Songwriter) (Vocalist)
2018 – Antimatter – Finding Enlightenment (Writer) (Producer) (Director) (Soundtrack) (Videographer)
2019 – Antimatter – An Epitaph (Performer) (Vocalist)
2020 – Oceans of Slumber – Color of Grace (Actor) (Videographer) (Vocalist)
2021 – Michal Lapaj – Flying Blind (Vocalist)
2021 – Michal Lapaj – Shattered Memories (Vocalist)
