= Duncan Patterson =

English musician (born 1975)

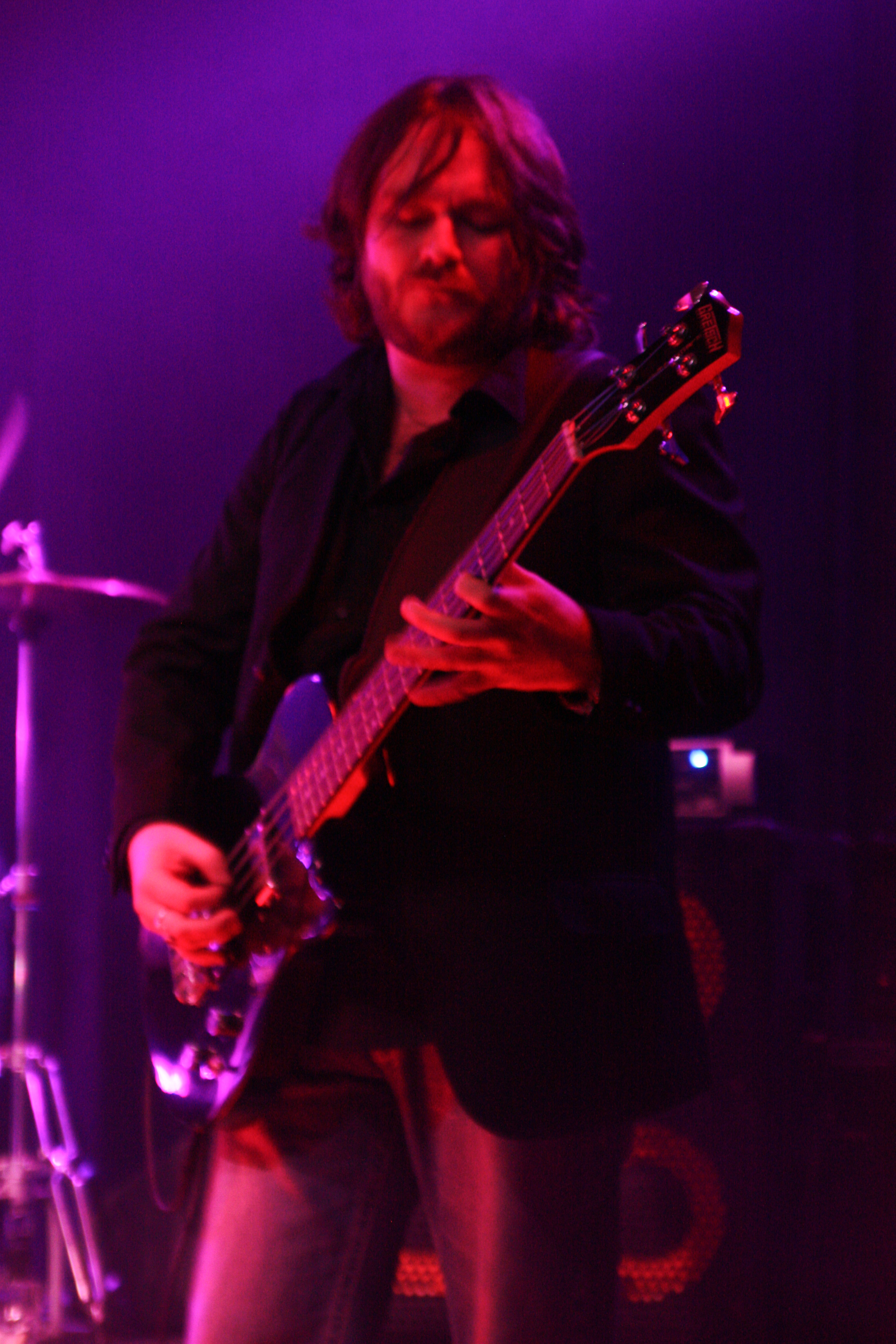
- Patterson with Alternative 4 in 2011

Background information
- Born: 5 June 1975 (age 51); Liverpool, England
- Genres: Alternative rock, electronica, trip hop, gothic metal, soundtrack, folk, punk
- Occupation: Musician
- Instruments: Bass, guitar, keyboards, harp
- Years active: 1990–present

Duncan Patterson (born 5 June 1975) is an English musician, best known for his work as a member of Anathema (1991–1998) and Antimatter (1998–2005).

== Career ==
Patterson was a driving force behind Anathema's success during their earlier years, being the principal songwriter on the Eternity and Alternative 4 albums. These songs were Anathema's shift towards a softer, deeper style. He quit Anathema in 1998 and formed a new project called Antimatter. After releasing four albums with Antimatter, spanning several genres (ambient, electronica, acoustic), he started another full-time project called Íon, a mix of acoustic and traditional music. In between recording and touring his own projects, he has enjoyed chart success with the Irish alternative rock band The Aftermath, playing on three Top 20 singles, as well as appearing on their debut album, Friendlier Up Here alongside The Waterboys' Steve Wickham. Patterson also wrote and performed the music on the German rapper Bushido's single, "Von der Skyline zum Bordstein zurück", which charted at #14 in Germany. He is also the founder of Strangelight Records, a small independent record label.

Patterson's music was used in Hisham Zreiq's films, music that was composed for Íon was used in the award-winning film The sons of Eilaboun, and music that was composed for Antimatter was used in the film, Just Another Day.

In 2011, he started a new band called Alternative 4, which released 2 albums, The Brink (2011) and The Obscurants (2014).

In 2012, he recorded mandolin for the unofficial Irish Euro 2012 anthem alongside Shane MacGowan, entitled "The Rockier Road To Poland".

He released his first full length solo album The Eternity Suite in 2015 before taking a break from music. During this time he committed to the straight edge way of life and has returned to writing music. A second solo album titled Grace Road was released in 2022.

Aside from his solo career he also plays in Antifear alongside ex-Anathema bandmate Darren White.

== Discography ==
=== Alternative 4 ===
- Alternative 4 – The Brink (Avantgarde 2011)
- Alternative 4 – The Brink re-release CD/DVD (Prophecy 2012)
- Alternative 4 – The Obscurants (Prophecy 2014)

=== Anathema ===
- Anathema – They Die/Crestfallen 7-inch (Witchhunt, 1991)
- V/A – Volume 4 (Peaceville, 1992)
- Anathema – The Crestfallen (Peaceville, 1992)
- Anathema – Serenades (Peaceville, 1993)
- Anathema – We Are The Bible 7-inch (Peaceville, 1994)
- V/A – In The Name Of Satan (Gun/Drakkar, 1994)
- Anathema – Pentecost III (Peaceville, 1995)
- Anathema – The Silent Enigma (Peaceville/MFN, 1995)
- Anathema – Eternity (Peaceville/MFN, 1996)
- V/A – Under The Sign Of The Sacred Star (Peaceville, 1996)
- V/A – Slatanic Slaughter II (Black Sun, 1996)
- Anathema – A Vision Of A Dying Embrace VHS (Peaceville/MFN, 1997)
- V/A – X (Peaceville, 1997)
- Anathema – Alternative Future EP (Peaceville/MFN, 1998)
- Anathema – Alternative 4 (Peaceville/MFN, 1998)
- Anathema – Resonance (Peaceville, 2001)
- Anathema – Resonance 2 (Peaceville, 2002)
- Anathema – A Vision Of A Dying Embrace DVD (Peaceville, 2002)
- Anathema – Hindsight (KScope, 2008)

=== Antimatter ===
- Antimatter – Saviour (Prophecy/The End, 2002)
- Antimatter – Live@K13 (Strangelight, 2003)
- Antimatter – Lights Out (Strangelight/Prophecy/The End, 2003)
- Antimatter – Unreleased 1998–2003 (Internet release, 2003)
- V/A – The Lotus Eaters (Black Lotus, 2004)
- Antimatter – Planetary Confinement (Prophecy/The End, 2005)

=== Íon ===
- Íon – Madre, Protégenos (Equilibrium, 2006)
- Íon – Immaculada (Equilibrium, 2010/Restricted Release 2011)

=== Duncan Patterson ===
- Duncan Patterson – The Eternity Suite (Strangelight Records 2015)
- Duncan Patterson – Grace Road (Strangelight Records 2022)

=== Others ===
- Gashead 2000 – demos (1991)
- The Illuminoids – unreleased tracks (1995)
- Deathcap – Ibiza Love Missile single (2005)
- W.E.B – Don't Wake Futility (Sleazy Rider, 2005)
- Breaklose – Always Late Enough (Strangelight, 2006)
- The Aftermath – One Is Fun single (LiveTransmission, 2006)
- The Aftermath – Hollywood Remake single (LiveTransmission, 2006)
- Bull Doza – Celebration (2006)
- Bushido – Von der Skyline zum Bordstein zurück (ersguterjunge/Sony BMG, 2006)
- The Aftermath – All I Want Is for You to Be Happy (LiveTransmission, 2007)
- The Aftermath – Friendlier Up Here (LiveTransmission, 2008)
- The Eternal – Kartika (Firebox, 2009)
- V/A – Enemies (Indiestate 2009)
- Phase – In Consequence (BackStage / InsightOut, 2010)
- Corde Oblique – A Hail Of Bitter Almonds (2011)
- Pete Courtney – White Roses (2012)
- Shane MacGowan, The Aftermath & Friends – The Rockier Road To Poland (LiveTransmission, 2012)
