= Antimatter (band) =

British dark rock band

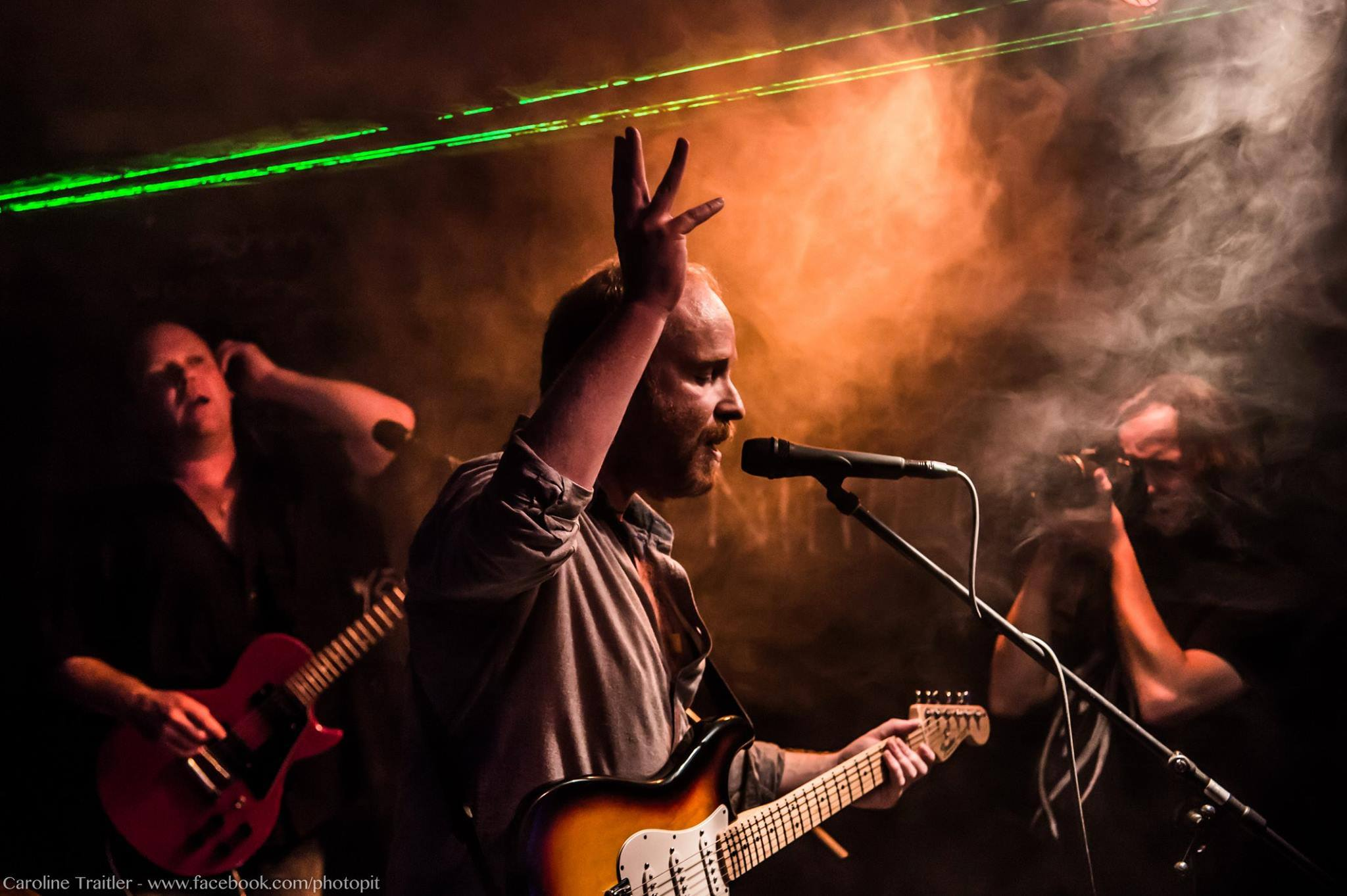
- Mick Moss, Zürich, Switzerland, October 2015

Background information
- Also known as: Angelica (1998)
- Origin: Liverpool, England
- Genres: Gothic rock; progressive rock; dark ambient; trip hop (early)
- Years active: 1998–present
- Labels: Prophecy Productions; The End; Music in Stone; Strangelight
- Members: Mick Moss
- Past members: Duncan Patterson
- Website: antimatteronline.com

Antimatter, a UK gothic rock band, is the solo project of longtime founding member Mick Moss. The project was originally a duo composed of founding member Duncan Patterson (former bassist/songwriter of Anathema) and Moss, being essentially an amalgamation of two solo projects working in tandem with each other, with each member writing and arranging their songs alone and compiling them in the studio later on to create an album. In this manner, the pair released three albums together, Saviour, Lights Out and Planetary Confinement, after which Patterson left, in 2005, to start another band Íon. Moss continued Antimatter as an extension of his own timeline established throughout the first three discs, releasing the project's fourth album Leaving Eden in 2007. Moss followed with 'Live@An Club', (released on his own label Music in Stone), Alternative Matter, Fear of a Unique Identity, The Judas Table, "Too Late", Welcome To The Machine, Live Between The Earth & Clouds, and, most recently, Black Market Enlightenment in 2018.

Describing Antimatter's sound for an article in The Krakow Post in 2016, late U.S. journalist Dewey Gurall said "while the early albums had more of a triphop vibe with lots of female vocals (think Portishead or Zero 7), nowadays that type of electronic ambience and rhythm are more integrated with art rock, prog, metal, folk, shoegazer, a dash of classic British pop, and even grunge, all while never wandering too far from that darkwave sensibility mentioned earlier. The lead vocals are handled completely, and masterfully, by Mick. On paper, the mix of different genre might sound like it wouldn’t work, maybe even like a bit of a mess. Instead, from so many different elements, Moss has constructed something both wholly original and emotionally moving".

== History ==
=== Pre-History and Formation (1998–99) ===
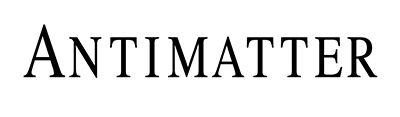
The logo for Antimatter has been used on every release since the debut album 'Saviour' in 2001.

The original line-up of Antimatter; Mick Moss (left) and Duncan Patterson

Without hearing each other's latest recordings, in 1998 Duncan Patterson and Mick Moss had both reached the same place musically and philosophically. Patterson had just finished recording Anathema's 'Alternative 4' album and Moss had been working on a set of demos. The similarities were striking. Moss had produced 'Saviour', 'Over Your Shoulder' and 'Angelic', which drew parallels directly to Patterson's 'Empty', 'Feel' and 'Destiny'. Both sets of recordings were dark, melodic and minimal, lyrically dealing with a discomfort with oneself and others. Patterson at the time had grown restless with Anathema, and upon hearing Moss’ demos suggested they record together. Patterson quit Anathema in 1998 and re-recorded Moss’ 3 tracks as a demo to pass to labels, under the moniker of ‘Angelica’. The demo was originally rejected by Peaceville Records as being too melodic and not leaning enough towards heavy metal. Patterson later penned and recorded a 4th track, ‘Holocaust’, for the demo. In 1999, Australian band Cryptal Darkness contacted Patterson, and during a later conversation a member of CD (who also ran the group's label) asked Patterson what he had been involved with since leaving Anathema. Patterson mailed a cassette of the demo off, and upon hearing it the label agreed to release the duo's first album.

=== Saviour (2000–02) ===
Signed to Icon Records, in September 2000 they entered Academy Studios, Dewsbury, as Antimatter to record their debut album, Saviour. Patterson contributes the tracks "Holocaust", "God Is Coming", "Flowers" and "Going Nowhere", while Moss brings "Saviour", "Over Your Shoulder", "Psalms", "Angelic" and "The Last Laugh". Although Moss performed vocals on his original demos, Patterson has the idea to have mainly female vocals, performed by Michelle Richfield and Hayley Windsor. Moss performs vocals on two tracks only. Instrumentation is split between Patterson and Moss.

In 2001, the album and band received "Album of the Year" and "Best Newcomer of the Year" in Psycho! magazine. Unfortunately, Antimatter's record label distributed only a small number of copies despite demand for much more, and it soon became apparent that the label wasn't able to manufacture and distribute copies of the album in reasonable numbers. Thus began a 12-month battle between act and label, with Icon Records holding onto the rights of Saviour despite being unable to release it.

In early 2002 Moss turned down an offer to join a burgeoning Anathema in the vacant bassplayer role for the 'A Natural Disaster' album onward, opting instead to stay with the still struggling Antimatter. In March Danny Cavanagh briefly and controversially quit Anathema with the intention of joining Antimatter, only to re-join Anathema weeks later. On 29 July Saviour finally received a substantial release with Prophecy Productions in Europe, followed by a North American release from The End Records on 24 September. In October Patterson finances a 5 date Western Europe tour, with Antimatter joined by Danny Cavanagh. Michelle Richfield and Hayley Windsor did not feature in the line-up, with lead vocals being taken by Mick Moss. The debut performance took place at 'The Frontline, Ghent, Belgium on 4 October, followed by four more dates in France and Netherlands. Later that month, Moss published via the internet a free 5-track EP A Dream for the Blind, featuring recordings of himself and Cavanagh rehearsing in Liverpool for that year's debut tour. The release came complete with artwork to be printed off by the public.

=== Lights Out and Live@K13 (2003) ===
Antimatter entered the studio in January 2003 to record their 2nd album, Lights Out, with Moss contributing the tracks "Everything You Know Is Wrong", "The Art of a Soft Landing", "In Stone" and "Dream", while Patterson brings "Lights Out", "Expire", "Reality Clash" and "Terminal". The album (recorded during a month is Sun Studios Dublin) marks a shift from its predecessor. Despite the presence of guest vocalists Michelle Richfield and Hayley Windsor, Moss now performs vocals on most of his own tracks and half of Patterson's. In March, the track "Over Your Shoulder", from the debut album, Saviour, is used for soundtrack purposes in MTV's reality TV show Sorority Life. In May/June 2003 Antimatter toured the West Coast of the United States with Virgin Black and Agalloch. Afterwards, Antimatter, accompanied by Mehdi Messouci (VÆV, Breaklose) on piano and backing vocals, headed into Europe to perform in Greece and then into Asia, performing in Istanbul, rounding off the tour with an appearance at a festival in Skali, Cyprus. On 24 June, Lights Out is released. At the same time, Patterson releases the acoustic live album Live@K13 (recorded during their debut tour in 2002) on his record label Strangelight Records. A month later, in July, Antimatter headlined Estonia's annual festival Hard Rock Laager, the country's largest alternative music festival held in the village of Vana-Vigala. In October 2003, Antimatter reconvened to Sun Studios, Dublin, to record a version of Dead Can Dance’s "Black Sun". The recording is followed by a tour of Germany with Autumnblaze. In December 2003, Antimatter published onto the internet the album Unreleased 98-03, featuring demos and unheard versions of songs from the first two albums. The album was made available as a free download and once again came complete with artwork.

=== Planetary Confinement and Patterson's departure (2004–05) ===
In 2004, Patterson made the decision to quit Antimatter to pursue his solo project 'Ion', but not before contributing to his final album with the band, Planetary Confinement, an album to be recorded in two-halves, one by Moss in England, the other by Patterson in Ireland and France. On 25 May 'The Lotus Eaters - A Tribute To Dead Can Dance' is released, featuring Antimatter's version of Black Sun, recorded in October 2003. Moss's English sessions (‘Weight of The World’, ‘Legions’, ‘Epitaph’ and ‘A Portrait of the Young Man as an Artist’) commenced on 16 July in Studio 33, Liverpool, and featured a band assembled by Moss that year (Rachel Brewster – Violins, Ste Hughes – Bass and Chris Phillips – Drums), with Moss choosing to forgo any guest vocalists, performing all vocal parts himself. Patterson's sessions ('Planetary Confinement', 'Line of Fire', 'Mr White', 'Relapse' and 'Eternty Pt24') followed in December of the same year, with the vocal duties held by Amelie Festa and extra instrumentation by Mehdi Messouci (VÆV, Breaklose), Barry Whyte, Alex Mazarguil (Breaklose) and Micheál ó Croinín. By comparison Moss produced more organic sounding recordings while Patterson's still retained an electronic edge despite being acoustic based.

Planetary Confinement, a stark acoustic album in the face of two previous semi-electronic outings, was released on 29 July 2005, signalling Patterson's official departure from the project. Patterson announced his Ion project, while Moss simultaneously announced he would continue with Antimatter and was wrapping up the writing to the 4th album, to be titled ‘Leaving Eden’.

=== Leaving Eden and Live@An Club (2006–09) ===
In June 2006, Moss entered Fair Trade Studios, Liverpool, to record Antimatter's 4th album, Leaving Eden, re-assembling the band he had originally formed for his 'Planetary Confinement' sessions, with the addition of Danny Cavanagh. German rapper Bushido has released his fourth studio album, Von der Skyline zum Bordstein zurück, in September, with music completely sampled from the band, without permission. The rapper has sampled the songs "Epitaph" (from Planetary Confinement) and "Terminal" (from Lights Out) on his singles "Sonnenbank Flavour" and "Von der Skyline zum Bordstein zurück" respectively. In late October, Moss accompanied Danny Cavanagh and Leafblade on a Norwegian tour.

Leaving Eden is released on 13 April 2007. Moss spends the rest of the year touring the album, appearing in the Netherlands, Belgium, France, Poland, Greece, Turkey, Serbia, Croatia, Austria, Italy, Latvia and Estonia.

In April 2008 Antimatter headlined Poland's Art Rock Festival in Poznan. Later that year, Moss instigates a union with Duncan Patterson for the purposes of performing live together under the heading of ‘An Evening of Antimatter, Anathema and Ion Music’, bringing together both writers’ musical back catalogue into one live show with the first tour in this format being in September with Patterson and Moss touring Portugal and Spain, and uniting again for tours in Hungary, Romania, Italy, Finland, France, Poland and Latvia to round the year off. In October Moss announced a fifth album was in the construction stages, as well as ‘Alternative Matter’, a 10-year anniversary retrospective set of alternate versions and demos.

In 2009 Moss formed his own label, Music in Stone, to release Antimatter's ‘Live@An Club’, an acoustic performance recorded the previous year in Athens, Greece. The album was released on 10 April, coinciding with the first show of Moss and Patterson's 3rd union tour. A month later they would headline at Germany's annual festival Wave Gotik Treffen, one of the largest worldwide gothic subculture events. In November, Turkish photographer and filmmaker Fethi Karaduman published his promo clip for Antimatter's ‘Epitaph’ track, from 2005's ‘Planetary Confinement’. In November/December, Moss and Patterson performed the fourth final union tour in Scandinavia.

=== Alternative Matter (2010–11) ===
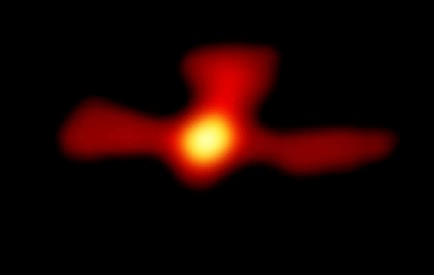
An image of an antimatter cloud generated by William Purcell of NASA, who granted Mick Moss permission to use the image as a cover for the 2010 compilation 'Alternative Matter'.

‘Alternative Matter’ was released in November 2010 in two versions, a 2-disc set digipack and a limited edition 4-disc artbook containing 100 pages of photographs and advanced liner notes by Moss, a bonus E.P. of material exorcised from the 2-disc version and a DVD containing a 30-minute documentary, Karaduman's ‘Epitaph’ promo, and a promo for ‘Conspire’ from Leaving Eden, featuring hand made animation by Krzysztof Baran. Moss also announced that he now had two new albums in the construction stages.

In 2011 the next Antimatter studio album was announced as 'Wide Awake in the Concrete Asylum', with demos being produced that year. In June Antimatter performed (by Marillion's request) at 'Marillion Weekend', in Leamington, with Moss forming a full line-up for the event, consisting of past and present session musicians from Antimatter's studio history. Antimatter were asked back to perform at 'Marillion Christmas' in December, at Manchester Academy.

=== Fear of a Unique Identity and Too Late (2012–14) ===
2012 saw Moss enter Sandhills Studios to record the next Antimatter album, now re-titled to 'Fear of a Unique Identity'. At the same time 'Broken Smile' by The Beautified Project was released, featuring guest vocals by Moss, charting at Number 1 in their native Armenia. On 1 June, Moss announced that he had signed a two-album deal with Prophecy Productions for 'Fear Of A Unique Identity' and the 6th album 'The Judas Table'. At the end of the year, on 23 November, Fear of a Unique Identity was released worldwide by Prophecy Productions, entering the official German Newcomer Chart at number 6.

2013 saw Moss tour extensively with pianist/vocalist Vic Anselmo, throughout Europe, returning to Armenia In May that year to headline the '1st Annual Rock Fest Competition'. In September, the first electric Antimatter shows were performed in Italy by Mick Moss with his live band, marking an immediate change from bare-bones acoustic tours to full electric tours from this point onward, including by a package tour with Finnish band Swallow The Sun a month later, which Moss performed having been discharged from hospital after abdominal surgery only a day earlier.

On 18 March 2014, the song 'Too Late' was released digitally, which saw a return to a more acoustic-based sound in contrast to the New Wave sound of previous release 'Fear Of A Unique Identity', and ten days later the Antimatter live band embarked on a two-week tour performing the Leaving Eden album in its entirety. The tour would be repeated again in Autumn. On 12 July, Antimatter opened the popular BeProg Festival in Barcelona, Spain, sharing the stage with Fish and Opeth. On 31 October, Moss launched a new project Sleeping Pulse with Portuguese writer/guitarist Luis Fazendeiro, with the debut album 'Under The Same Sky' being released on Prophecy Productions. At the end of the year, in late December, Moss toured alone playing one-man acoustic shows under the title of 'Mick Moss - Songbook' performing Antimatter songs along with a selection of covers.

=== The Judas Table, Welcome To The Machine and Live Between The Earth And Clouds (2015–17) ===
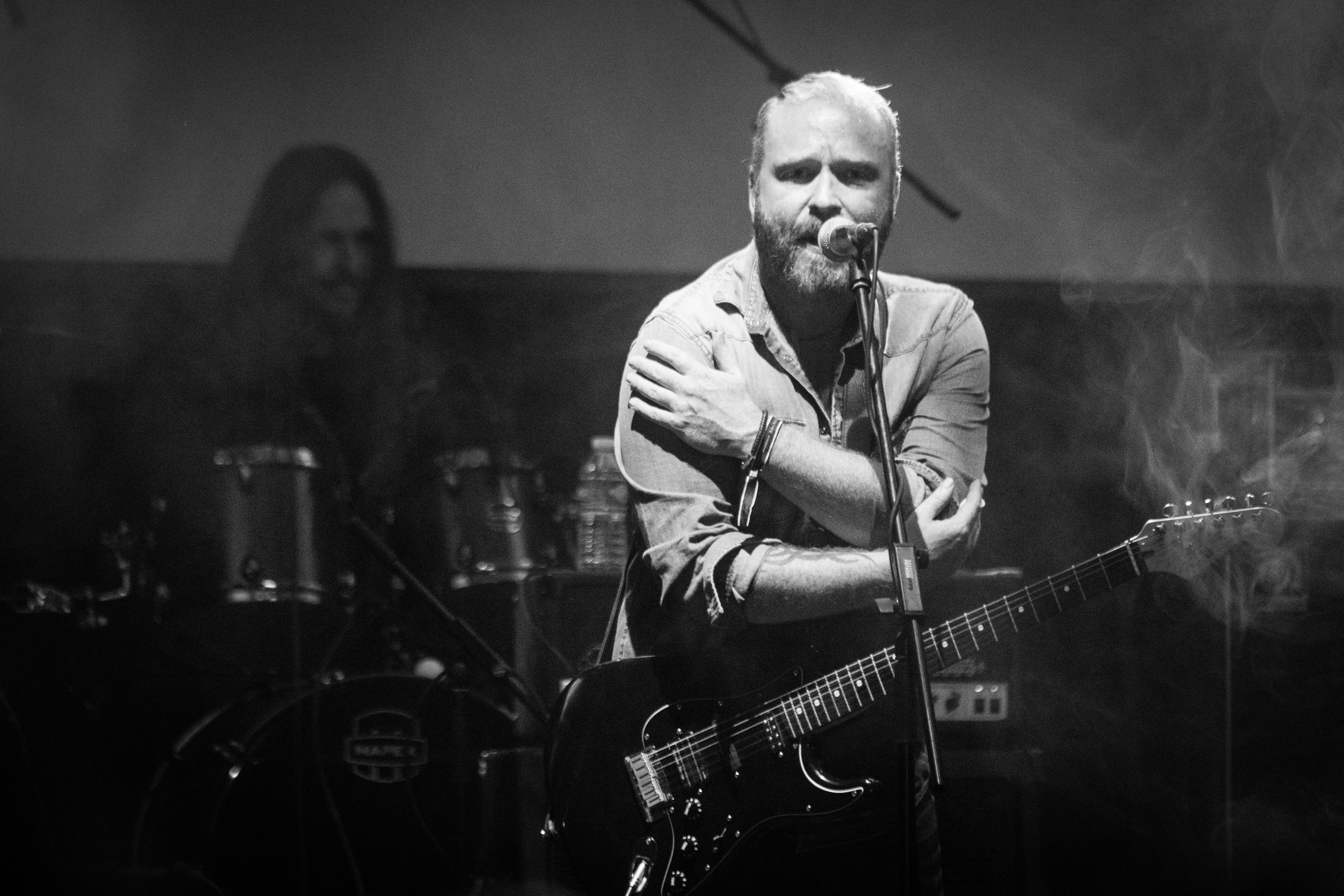
Mick Moss performs an Antimatter set with his live band at Prophecy Festival, Balve, Germany in May 2016.

Throughout 2015, Moss continued his solo Songbook acoustic shows as well as pre-production on the upcoming 6th album 'The Judas Table'. In Summer, the Antimatter live band performed a string of European festivals including Castle Party, Poland, Metalhead Meeting, Romania and two consecutive dates at Wave Gotik, Germany. The Judas Table was released on 9 October 2015, coinciding with The Judas Tour and the release of the video to the song Stillborn Empires, and was the final Antimatter album to be released on long-term label Prophecy Productions, who had released every studio album since the debut in 2002. Moss travelled to Brazil in September to perform the first Antimatter show in South America at Overload Festival. The year was rounded off by an appearance at Doom Over Kiev Festival, Ukraine.

The Judas Tour continued throughout 2016, as well as a series of two-man acoustic shows. On 9 January, the live band performed a rare UK show at Camden, London. The evening was covered by Prog! magazine for issue 63, published the following month. The issue also featured a 4-page interview with Moss covering The Judas Table and Antimatter's history up until that date, marking the first major coverage of Antimatter in a UK publication. The live band performed at Prophecy Festival, Balve, Germany on 30 July, performing a set of songs from the first four albums. Two singles, Welcome To The Machine and Too Late were released on 23 September. This marked the complete shift of Antimatter releases from Prophecy Productions to Moss' label Music In Stone, making Antimatter now a cottage industry a full eleven years after it had become Moss' solo project alone. The year was rounded off by an appearance at Hammer Of Doom Festival, Germany on 19 Nov followed by a one-off show with a string quartet in Kiev, Ukraine on 26 Nov which Moss described as 'a bucket list moment'.

The CD/DVD Live Between The Earth and Clouds was released on 3 March 2017, coinciding with a short tour marking the 10th anniversary of Leaving Eden that imagined what the setlist might have been if Moss had been able to perform the album with a live band back in 2007 instead of being limited to acoustic shows. The same month, the live band appeared at three festivals, Prog Dreams VI Festival, Netherlands, Darker Days Festival, UK and Music Drive Festival, Armenia. On 8 May, Moss announced via the projects Facebook page that he was taking an 18-month break from touring (with the exemption of the few dates that were already booked but not performed yet). From this point onward, work began on the 7th Antimatter album.

=== Black Market Enlightenment and An Epitaph (2018–21) ===
On 13 July 2018 the live band performed at Night Of The Prog Festival, Germany, followed the next month by an appearance at Epic Eye Festival, Armenia. A promo video for the song 'The Third Arm' was released on 5 October. The 7th album Black Market Enlightenment was released on 9 November 2018, signalling a return to full time touring after an 18-month hiatus, with 'Black Market Tour' lasting for most of November. The year was rounded off with appearances at Madrid Is The Dark Festival, Spain and Under The Doom Festival, Portugal on 7 and 8 December.

2019 began with an appearance in Dubai, UAE, marking the first ever appearance in the middle east. This was followed with the second leg of the Black Market Tour in March. In June, the promo video for 'The Third Arm' was nominated in the 'Video of the Year' category of the Progressive Music Awards 2019. On 24 August, the live band performed at InoRock Festival, Poland, second on the bill to Anathema. October saw three festival appearances at Doom Over Kyiv, Ukraine, Into The Void Festival, Netherlands and Metal Gates Festival, Romania. On 15 November, the CD/DVD 'An Epitaph' was released. The live recording from 2016 featured the live band playing with a string quartet and had been delayed for three years. Its release coincided with the first date of the third and final Black Market Tour which began with a second appearance at Hammer Of Doom Festival, Germany.

On 12 March 2020, the live band performed the first-ever electric show in Turkey. Plans for a duo of 20th Anniversary tours were cancelled due to the global impact of COVID-19.

In an interview with Rockway, Greece, recorded in 2018 and published on 14 January 2021, Mick Moss stated "I do have the next album written... I've had the next album for years... I've got the title for the next album and all the songs... but I'm sitting on it for the time being. I'm a bit burned out after the last album. It hurt to make Black Market Enlightenment. I need a rest."

== Members ==
=== Current members ===
- Mick Moss – lead vocals, acoustic solo & electric guitar, bass guitar, keyboards and samples, orchestral arr., producer (1998–present)

=== Former members ===
- Duncan Patterson – bass guitar, acoustic & electric guitar, keyboards and samples, producer (1998–2005)

=== Session touring members ===
- Daniel Cavanagh – piano, lead guitar, backing vocals (2002, 2006–2007)
- Mehdi Messouci – piano, backing vocals (2003)
- Hayley Windsor – backing vocals (2003)
- Pete Gilchrist – backing vocals (2007)
- Rachel Brewster – violin (2008, 2015)
- Colin Fromont – percussion, drums (2008, 2011)
- Lisa Cuthbert – piano, backing vocals (2009, 2011)
- David Hall – lead guitar, backing vocals (2011–present)
- Ste Hughes – bass (2011, 2013–present)
- Mark Kriegs – bass (2012)
- Vic Anselmo – piano, backing vocals (2013)
- Liam Edwards – drums (2013–2016)
- Jenny O'Connor – backing vocals (2015)
- Fab Regmann – drums (2016–present)

== Discography ==
=== Studio albums ===
- Saviour (2001)
- Lights Out (2003)
- Planetary Confinement (2005)
- Leaving Eden (2007)
- Fear of a Unique Identity (2012)
- The Judas Table (2015)
- Black Market Enlightenment (2018)
- A Profusion of Thought (2022)

=== Singles/EPs ===
- Too Late (2014)
- Welcome to the Machine (2016)

=== Video albums ===
- "Live Between The Earth & Clouds" DVD/CD (2017)
- "An Epitaph" DVD/CD (2019)

=== Compilation albums ===
- Unreleased 1998–2003 (2003)
- Alternative Matter (2010)
- Timeline: An Introduction To Antimatter (2015)
- Parallel Matter (Rarities 2001–24) (2025)

=== Live albums ===
- Live@K13 (2004)
- Live@An Club (2009)

=== Promo videos ===
- Epitaph (Fethi Karaduman)
- Conspire (Krzystof Baran)
- Uniformed & Black (Mehdi Messouci)
- Stillborn Empires (Tomfoolery Pictures)
- The Third Arm (MG Studio)
