= Kodama (album) =

2016 studio album by Alcest

Studio album by Alcest
- Released: September 30, 2016
- Recorded: January–April 2016
- Studios: Drudenhaus Studio, Issé, France
- Genres: Blackgaze; post-black metal
- Length: 42:12
- Language: French
- Label: Prophecy Productions
- Producers: Benoît Roux; Alcest

Alcest chronology
Shelter (2014)	Kodama (2016)	Spiritual Instinct (2019)

Singles from Kodama
- 1. "Oiseaux de proie" Released: 4 August 2016; 2. "Je suis d'ailleurs" Released: 30 August 2016

Kodama (Japanese for "tree spirit" or "echo") is the fifth studio album by French blackgaze band Alcest. It was released on September 30, 2016 via Prophecy Productions. It is a concept album about "the confrontation of the natural world and the human world", inspired by Hayao Miyazaki's film Princess Mononoke. Musically the album is a return to the band's earlier blackgaze style, due to Neige's feeling that he "needed to go for something more punchy, darker, and more personal." Kodama is also the first Alcest album to feature bassist Indria Saray, though he has performed live with the band since 2010.

== Production and recording ==
According to Neige, the band spent "many months" in the studio recording the album, from January to April 2016. The drums were first recorded in the band's own rehearsal space to an old tape recorded, "using only the natural reverb of the big attic room there, to give the sensation of a real, vast space." Having finished recording the drums, the band went to Drudenhaus Studio to record the rest of the album. Neige used only a Fender Jazzmaster with a variety of effect pedals, deliberately aiming to recreate the band's more natural live sound in the studio.

On January 15, 2016, Neige published a post that read: "New album. Recording started." on the band's Facebook page; he further commented that the album would be "definitively darker." On March 3, the recording of guitars was finished. On May 16, he stated that the album was in the mastering process. On July 26 they officially announced the title, cover art, track listing, and release date.

== Musical style, writing and composition ==
According to Winterhalter, "it was a 3 year writing process, in addition to 3 months of recording and mixing", with Neige beginning writing almost immediately after returning from recording Shelter in Iceland. "Untouched" was the first song written for this album, followed by the title track. "These two songs (especially 'Kodama') kind of forged the sound of the whole album. Through them I could foresee the album's shape and identity and the further direction I wanted to take for the rest of the album."

Neige has said that the album is heavily influenced by Japanese culture and by Hayao Miyazaki's film Princess Mononoke. Neige was particularly inspired by the film's protagonist San, seeing something of himself in her. Drawing on the film, Kodama particularly centres around the conflict between the "human" and "natural" worlds. Talking about the album's Japanese influence, Neige said that it comes from his own love of Japanese culture, particularly the way in which "Japan has a hyper technologic society, always ahead of its time, full of crazy items, gadgets, etc, but yet people there are very attached to tradition, nature, and spirituality." He cited the band's two tours of Japan, in which they performed within Buddhist temples, as having a profound influence on the direction of this album.

It also represents a return to Alcest's earlier blackgaze style. Neige said that they "wanted to go back to something a bit more punchy, because at the time we felt this need, in a very natural way, because after such a mellow record, you want to make something a bit more punchy." "As for the guitars, I wanted to bring back the riffing and contrasts in our sound, exploring the possibilities of the guitar as much as I possibly could. Vocal wise, I felt that some of the songs could benefit from more contrasted expressions. I chose not to limit myself and went from harsh screams to very airy and ethereal vocal lines." He also highlighted Grimes' album Visions, Tool's last two albums (Lateralus and 10,000 Days), Dinosaur Jr., The Smashing Pumpkins, Cocteau Twins, Explosions in the Sky, The Cure, and Sonic Youth as musical influences on the direction of this album.

The album is deliberately structured similarly to the band's previous albums Souvenirs d'un autre monde and Écailles de lune. All of these albums are just over 40 minutes and have a structure of 5 long tracks and one "stand out track at the end, in a more experimental style compared to the rest of the music. I like this formula and I feel like it was a big part of our identity on our first records. We wanted to pay tribute to that, especially since it's a structure I feel comfortable with when it comes to composing music. A lot of my favourite albums are short too, so it was the natural choice for Kodama." Winterhalter has said that, compared to previous albums, the band wanted to "do more with less. [...] This time, we put a lot more focus on the percussion and the energy aspect of the Alcest music, with an earthy, tribal feel at times." He also explained that the structure of the songs changed frequently during the writing process until the band were completely satisfied with them. "If certain things about the songs didn't match our original concept/guidelines, it was changed until it did fit, or even completely removed, as was the case with some entire songs (even after recording some of them)."

== Promotion and touring ==
The band toured Europe with Japanese post-rock band Mono throughout late 2016 in support of Kodama, which included nine UK dates. The lead single from the album, "Oiseaux de proie", premiered on August 4, 2016 along with an interview with Neige. The band released the second single from the album, "Je suis d'ailleurs", on August 30.

== Critical reception ==
Professional ratings
Aggregate scores
Source	Rating
Metacritic	87/100
Review scores
Source	Rating
AllMusic	3.5/5 stars
Exclaim!	7/10
Metal Hammer	4.5/5 stars
Punknews.org	4/5 stars
Sputnikmusic	4.5/5
Ultimate Guitar	7.3/10

Kodama received very positive reviews from music critics upon its initial release. At Metacritic (a review aggregator site which assigns a normalized rating out of 100 from music critics), based on 5 critics, the album has received a score of 87, indicating "universal acclaim".

Metal Hammer critic Luke Morton described the album as "breathtaking", writing, "Everything works in tandem to create a vast collage of bliss and despair – from the ethereal, almost joyous aura of 'Eclosion' to the bleakness of 'Je suis d’ailleurs'. Never rushing, but always growing, Kodama is an intricate tapestry." The album was featured by Bandcamp who described it as "the most satisfying Alcest record in nearly a decade." Stereogum writer Michael Nelson described the album as "pretty close to flawless, and it may even be something of a platonic ideal ... It has the lush, climactic qualities of Shelter, but the room-rattling urgency and unsettling shadows of Souvenirs [d'un autre monde] and Le secret. It's a journey of an album, but at no point does the trek feel tiresome: The scenery is ever-changing, utterly engaging, and endlessly wondrous," concluding that it was one of his favorite releases of 2016.

In the review for AllMusic, Thom Jurek concluded that "It's true that Alcest don't really offer anything musically new on Kodama; Neige does that in his lyrics. But the return of more physically intense music is welcome. The kinetic force that was missing on Shelter is a welcome (re)admission. Combined with the intense lyricism and dynamic contrasts, it makes for Alcest's most 'complete' album since 2007's Souvenirs d'un autre monde." Adam Nizam at Exclaim! also praised the album, saying, "When taken into the wider context of Alcest's discography, though, Kodama is a definite step in the right direction. The use of Japanese culture as an influence allows for a more unique musical journey, however short. Alcest strive for balance once more here, and for the most part, they achieve it."

== Track listing ==
All tracks are written by Neige.

No.	Title	Length
1.	"Kodama" ("Tree Spirit" or "Echo")	9:07
2.	"Éclosion" ("Eclosion")	8:54
3.	"Je suis d'ailleurs" ("I Am from Elsewhere")	7:22
4.	"Untouched"	5:12
5.	"Oiseaux de proie" ("Birds of Prey")	7:50
6.	"Onyx"	3:51
Total length:		42:12

Deluxe edition (bonus track)
No.	Title	Length
1.	"Notre sang et nos pensées" ("Our Blood and Our Thoughts")	6:06
Total length:		48:18

== Personnel ==
Credits adapted from the liner notes of Kodama.

Alcest

- Neige – guitar, vocals, keyboards, recording, production, mixing, illustrator, design
- Winterhalter – drums, recording, production, mixing

Additional musicians

- Indria Saray – bass guitar
- Kathrine Shepard – vocals on "Kodama"

Technical

- Benoît Roux – recording, production, mixing
- Mika Jussila – mastering
- KR – vinyl mastering

Artwork

- Andy Julia – photograph
- Førtifem – illustrator, design

== Charts ==
Chart performance for Kodama
Chart (2016)	Peak position
Belgian Albums (Ultratop Flanders)	109
Belgian Albums (Ultratop Wallonia)	186
German Albums (Offizielle Top 100)	15
Swiss Albums (Schweizer Hitparade)	62
UK Independent Album Breakers (OCC)	17
UK Rock & Metal Albums (Official Charts)	25
US Heatseekers Albums (Billboard)	8
