= Harakiri for the Sky =

Austrian post-black metal band

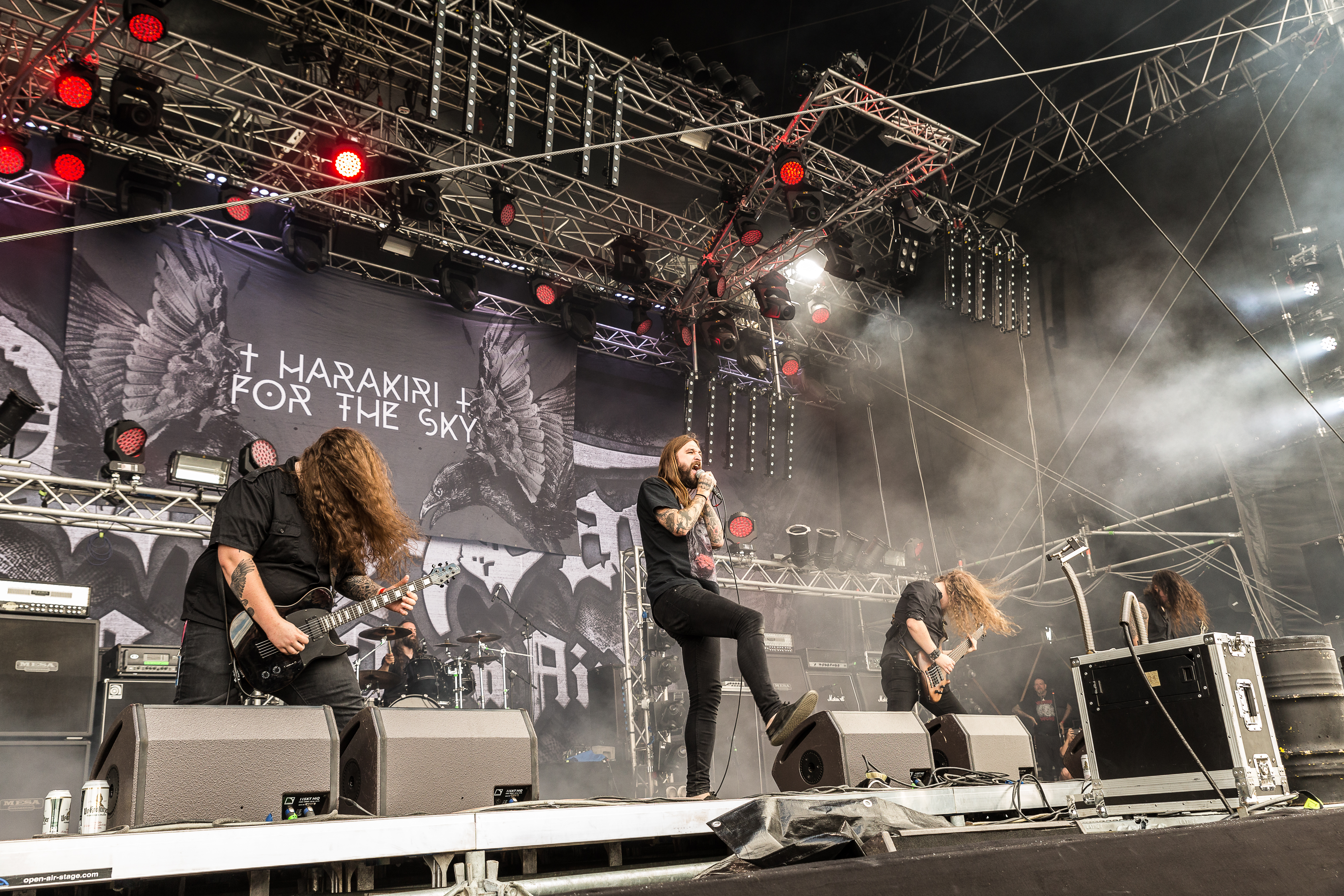
- Harakiri for the Sky at Party.San 2018

Background information
- Origin: Vienna and Salzburg, Austria
- Genres: Black metal; post-hardcore; post-metal
- Years active: 2011–present
- Label: AOP
- Members: Matthias Sollak; JJ
- Website: www.facebook.com/HarakiriForTheSky

Harakiri for the Sky is an Austrian post-black-metal band formed in Salzburg and Vienna in 2011 by vocalist JJ (Michael "V. Wahntraum" Kogler) and multi-instrumentalist Matthias Sollak, formerly of black metal band Bifröst. They have released six studio albums - Harakiri for the Sky (2012), Aokigahara (2014), III: Trauma (2016), Arson (2018), Mӕre (2021) and Scorched Earth (2025) - via German label AOP Records. The band has collaborated with numerous other bands in the post-black-metal scene, including Heretoir, Alcest, and Austere.

The band toured alongside Der Weg einer Freiheit and The Great Old Ones in March 2016, and played Summer Breeze Open Air later that year. For live performances, JJ and Sollak are joined by bassist Thomas Dornig, drummer Mischa Bruemmer, drummer Krimh, and guitarist Marrok. In 2017, they were nominated for the "Hard & heavy" category of the Amadeus Austrian Music Awards.

== Band members ==
Harakiri for the Sky, band members live at Rockharz 2026

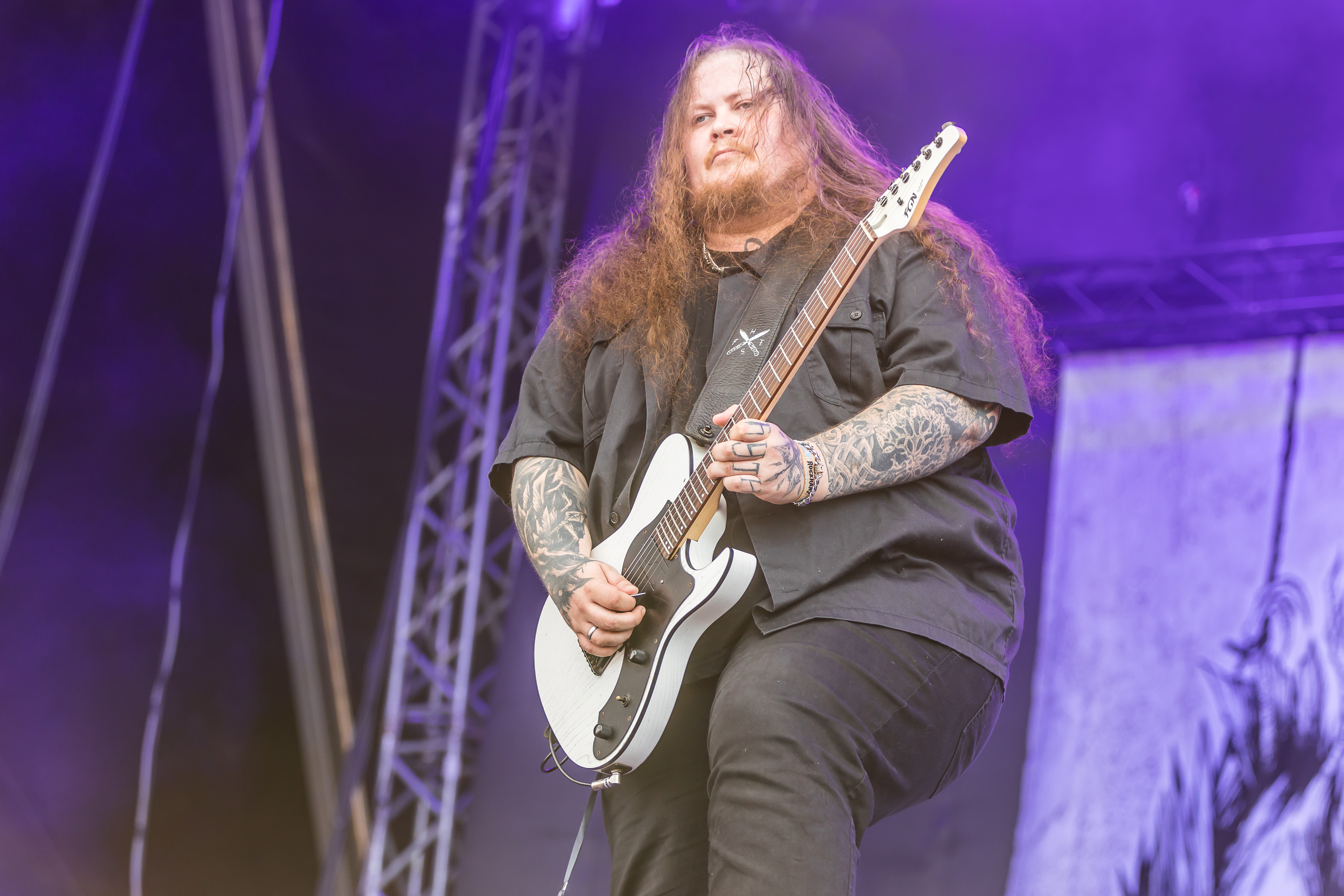
Matthias Sollak, all instruments, live guitar

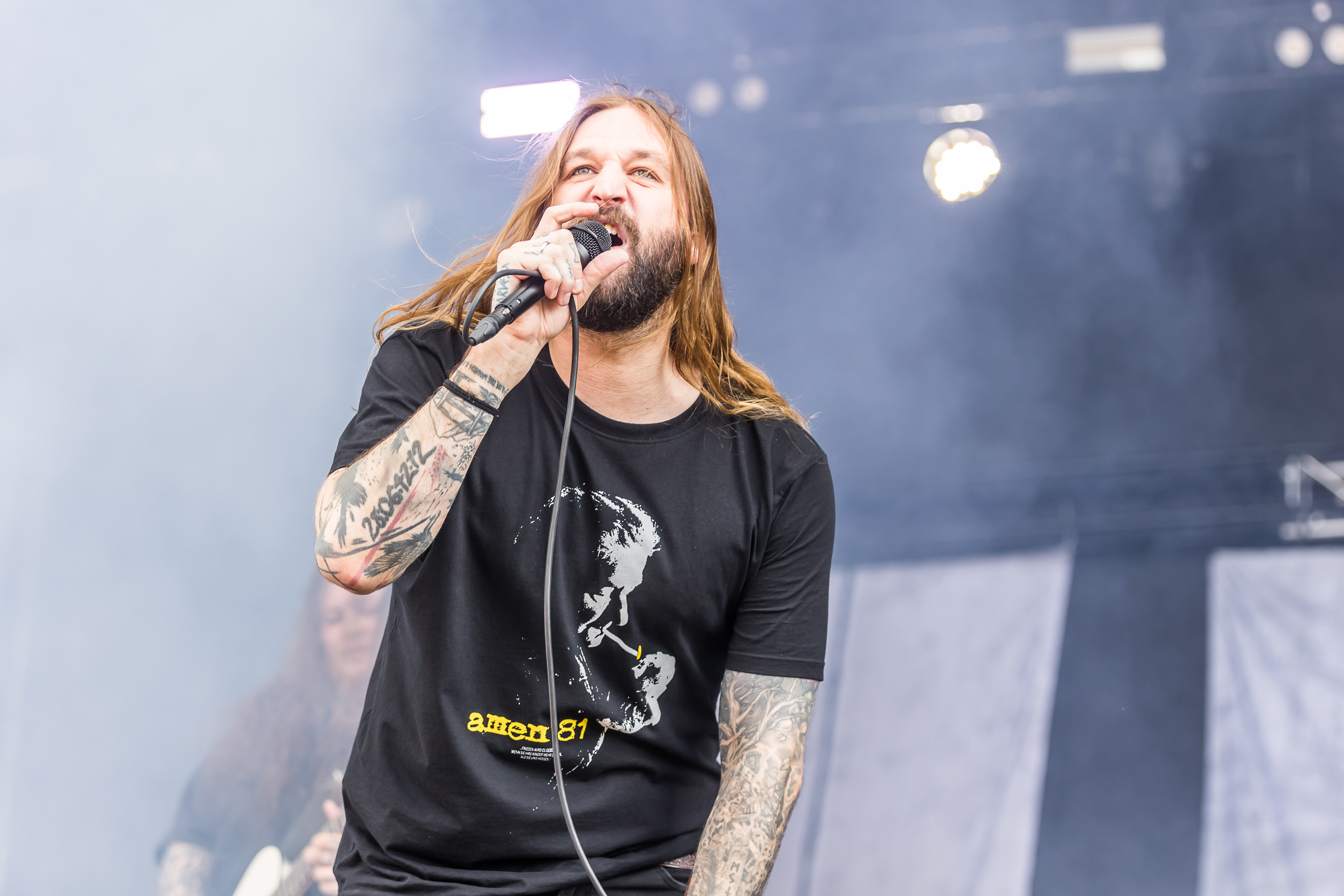
Michael Kogler, vocals

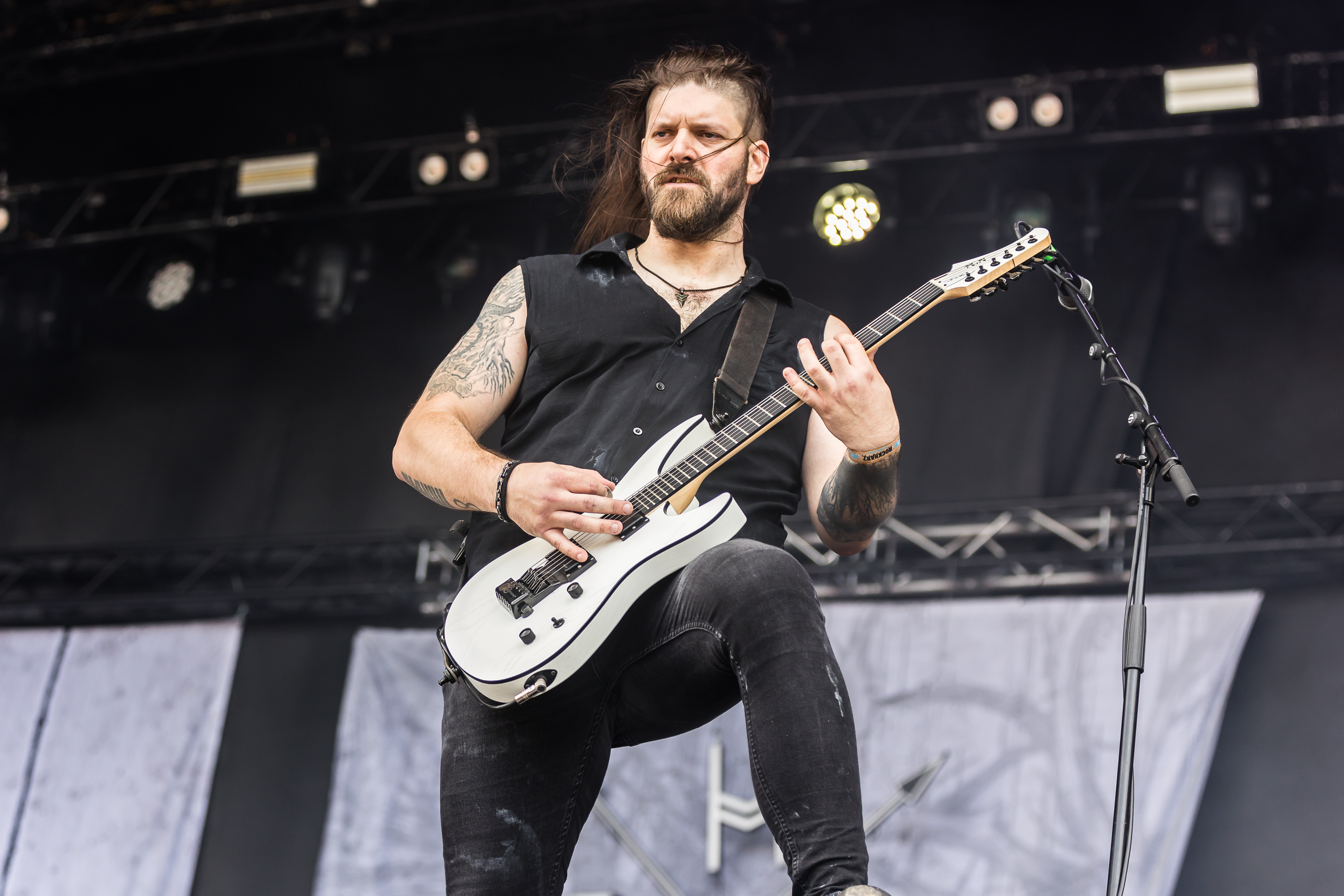
Chris Marrok, guitar (live)

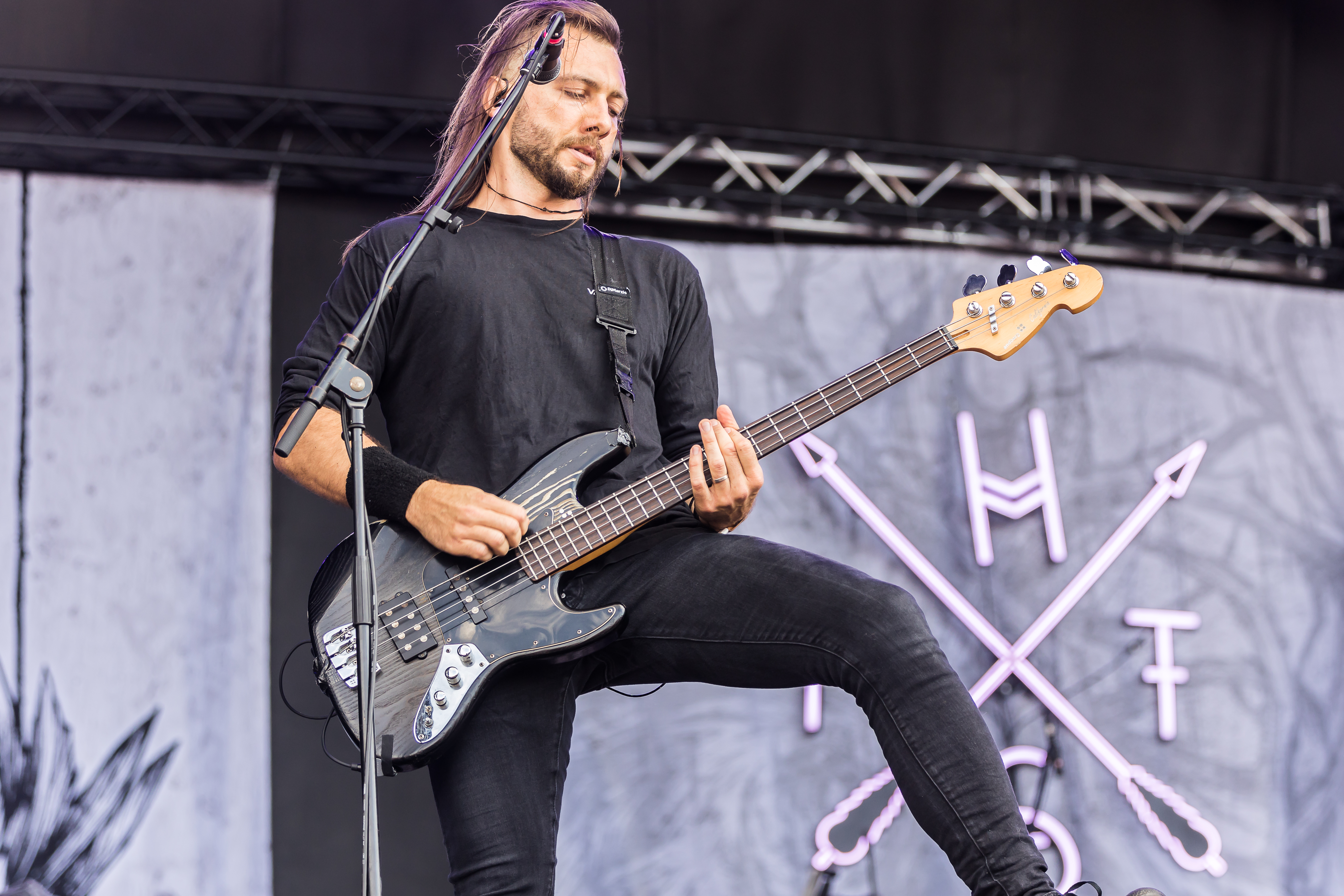
Radek Karpienko, bass (live)
- Matthias "MS" Sollak – guitars, bass, drums (2011–present)
- Michael "JJ" Kogler – vocals (2011–present)

=== Touring musicians ===
Current

- Thomas Dornig – bass (2012–present)
- Marrok – guitar, backing-vocals (2012–present)
- Mischa Bruemmer – drums (2013–present)
- Krimh – drums (2023–present)

Former

- Morbus J – drums (2012–2013)
- Thomas "T. Martyr" Leitner – drums (2014)

== Discography ==
Studio albums

Year	Title	Peak positions		
Year	Title	AUT	GER	SWI
2012	Harakiri for the Sky	—	—	—
2014	Aokigahara	—	—	—
2016	III: Trauma	—	—	—
2018	Arson	62	29	—
2021	Mӕre	35	4	22
2022	Aokigahara MMXXII	—	91	—
2022	Harakiri for the Sky MMXXII	—	—	—
2025	Scorched Earth	10	11	94

Box sets

- Wooden Tape Box (2015)

Singles

- "Calling the Rain" (2016)
- "Tomb Omnia" (2017)
- "You are the Scars" (2017)
- "Heroin Waltz" (2018)
- "I, Pallbearer" (2020)"
- "Sing for the Damage we've done" (feat. Neige of Alcest) (2020)
- "And Oceans between us" (2020)
- "I'm all about the Dusk" (2021)
- "Song to say Goodbye" (Placebo cover) (2021)
- "Mad World" (Tears for Fears cover) (2022)
- "02:19 AM, Psychosis" (2022)
- "Homecoming: Denied!" (2022)
- "Panoptycon" (feat. Eklatanz of Heretoir) (2022)
- "With Autumn I'll surrender" (2024)
- "Heal me" (feat. Tim Yatras of Austere) (2024)
- "Street Spirit (Fade out)" (Radiohead cover) (feat. P.G. of Groza) (2024)
- "Keep me longing" (2025)

Music videos

- "My Bones to the Sea" (2014)
- "The Traces we leave" (2016)
- "Heroin Waltz" (2018)
- "I, Pallbearer" (2020)
- "Sing for the Damage we've done" (feat. Neige of Alcest) (2020)
- "I'm all about the Dusk" (2020)
- "Us Against December Skies" (2021)
- "Mad World" (Tears for Fears cover) (2022)
- "With Autumn I'll surrender" (2024)
- "Heal me" (feat. Tim Yatras of Austere) (2024)
- "Keep me longing" (2025)
