= Écailles de lune =

Album by Alcest

Studio album by Alcest
- Released: March 26, 2010
- Recorded: 2009
- Studios: Klangschmiede Studio E, Mellrichstadt, Germany
- Genres: Blackgaze, post-black metal
- Length: 41:39
- Language: French
- Label: Prophecy Productions
- Producer: Martin Koller

Alcest chronology
Alcest / Les Discrets (2009)	Écailles de lune (2010)	Les Voyages de l'âme (2012)

Écailles de lune (lit. 'Moon Scales') is the second studio album by French blackgaze band Alcest, released on March 26, 2010 by Prophecy Productions. It is the first Alcest album featuring Winterhalter on drums. Although it continues in the direction started with the first album Souvenirs d'un autre monde, Écailles de lune marks a darker, louder transition into shoegaze, while also coming back to the band's black metal origins as it features harsh vocals like those found on their second release Le Secret.

Alcest mastermind Neige said of the album's concept, "This story isn't really a metaphor of death, as it would seem to be. For me, it is about a man who decides to leave one world for another one, literally. Like a passage to another reality, another state of existence... This time I was especially inspired by the seaside, the energy and the exaltation you can feel when you sit in front of the sea at night. It appears terribly fascinating, full of secrets and scary at the same time." "Solar Song" is sung in glossolalia, and "Sur l'océan couleur de fer" is a musical version of the poem by Paul-Jean Toulet. "Abysses" was written and performed in its entirety by Fursy Teyssier of Les Discrets, who also created the album's artwork.

The band celebrated the album with a 10-year anniversary tour across Europe, which was originally planned for 2020 but ultimately took place in 2023 because of the COVID-19 pandemic.

== Critical reception ==
Professional ratings
Review scores
Source	Rating
About.com	3.5/5 stars
AllMusic	4/5 stars
Metal Storm	8.7/10
Pitchfork	8.4/10
PopMatters	9/10
Sputnikmusic	4/5 stars

The album received positive reviews upon release. Ned Raggett of AllMusic gave the album four stars out of five, and in particular praised Neige's vocal performance, writing that "Neige's singing is some of his loveliest at many points throughout the album, a soft keen toward the middle of the second half of the title track, a low and contemplative rumination elsewhere – if not notably different from his earlier work in approach, it's at its most enjoyable here, and perhaps at its most beautifully serene on 'Solar Song', vocals overlaid to lovely effect."

Invisible Oranges praised the album, concluding that, "Sometimes the things you love don't need or don't benefit from explanation. The singularity of purpose oozes off this album – you just get it. Lead guitarist and compositional lynchpin Neige says Alcest is his way of musically translating an 'indescribably beautiful haven' that he first perceived as a child. That seems to be the common thread between the artists Alcest allegedly hybridize, My Bloody Valentine and Burzum: a single-minded longing for alternate realities. Kudos to Alcest for bridging musical worlds by listening to their heart."

== Track listing ==
All lyrics are written by Neige, except "Sur l'océan couleur de fer" by Paul-Jean Toulet; all music is composed by Neige, except "Abysses" by Fursy Teyssier

No.	Title	Length
1.	"Écailles de lune – Part 1" ("Moon Scales – Part 1")	9:52
2.	"Écailles de lune – Part 2" ("Moon Scales – Part 2")	9:48
3.	"Percées de lumière" ("Breakthroughs of Light")	6:37
4.	"Abysses" (instrumental)	1:40
5.	"Solar Song"	5:24
6.	"Sur l'océan couleur de fer" ("On the Iron-Colored Ocean")	8:18
Total length:		41:39

10th anniversary edition bonus track
No.	Title	Length
7.	"Circe Poisoning the Sea"	3:03

== Release history ==
Country	Date	Label	Format	Catalogue #	Notes
Germany	March 26, 2010	Prophecy Productions	CD	PRO106	
Germany	March 26, 2010	Prophecy Productions	Limited CD	PRO106LU	CD in digipak
Germany	March 26, 2010	Prophecy Productions	Deluxe box	PRO106BOX	Box set includes limited CD in digipak with flag and four postcards
Germany	March 26, 2010	Prophecy Productions	LP	PRO106LP	Reissued in several different vinyl variations since initial release. Variations include black vinyl, picture disc vinyl, and coloured vinyl including blue, clear, white, marbled, green, magenta, and orange.
Germany	September 1, 2016	Prophecy Productions	Cassette	PRO106MC	Issued in special slipcover

== Personnel ==
Alcest

- Neige – vocals, guitars, bass, keyboards
- Winterhalter – drums

Additional personnel

- Fursy Teyssier – all instruments on "Abysses", cover art
- Markus Stock – recording
- Neb Xort – mixing, mastering
- Martin Koller – producer
