= Melting Sun =

Studio album by Lantlôs
- Released: 2 May 2014
- Genres: Shoegaze, post-metal, doomgaze, alternative metal
- Length: 40:47
- Language: English
- Label: Prophecy Productions
- Producer: Markus Siegenhort

Lantlôs chronology
Agape (2011)	Melting Sun (2014)	Wildhund (2021)

Melting Sun is the fourth studio album by German post-metal band Lantlôs. It was released on 2 May 2014 through Prophecy Productions. The album marked a shift from the group’s earlier post-black metal style, embracing a shoegaze, post-rock, and dream pop sound, with critics praising its balance of accessibility and heaviness.

== Background, Recording and Influences ==
Lantlôs were formed in 2005 by Markus Siegenhort. Between 2008 and 2011 they released Lantlôs (2008), .neon (2010) and Agape (2011), with Neige of Alcest providing vocals on the latter two. By 2013, with Alcest’s touring schedule and a shift in creative direction by Siegenhort away from black metal influences, Neige amicably left the band.

Melting Sun was written, produced and recorded between 2012 and 2013 with Siegenhort aiming to capture the feeling of summer, in contrast to darker themes of Lantlôs’ previous releases. In an interview with Decibel Siegenhort stated, “I wrote it about trips we had in the mountains, during evenings in the summer. ... I sensed the energy of summer and sun for the first time when I wrote these songs...all of a sudden, the world brightened up." On the album’s lyrics, Siegenhort stated they were based on imagery and associated feelings rather than a cohesive narrative, noting, “It's just visions I had that fulfil(ed) the music... images rowed one after another. No sense, no direction, just images evoking feelings."

Siegenhort has cited Kayo Dot’s Choirs of the Eye as an influence, along with Deftones, Hum, and The Smashing Pumpkins.

== Critical reception ==
Professional ratings
Review scores
Source	Rating
Exclaim	7/10
Pitchfork	8/10
Angry Metal Guy	4/5

Upon release, Melting Sun received positive reviews from critics.

Natalie Zina Walschots of Exclaim! wrote, “At once moving and accessible, Melting Sun is an exquisite example of blackgaze that is comfortable exploring intricate and delicate textures while still retaining its heaviness" and praised praised Siegenhort’s “mellifluous yet powerful voice." Walschots went on to describe the record as “possessed by a swelling, supple kind of power," with songwriting that is “emotionally authentic and unapologetically catchy."

In an 8/10 review by Pitchfork, Grayson Haver Currin wrote, “Melting Sun pulls every trick in Lantlôs’ past into the present, making for charged pop that’s short neither on volume nor surprises nor impact" and praised its creative shift away from its black metal influences, writing “[it] doesn’t lose power simply because the band has discarded a once-central element of its sound." Currin went on to highlight its compositional variation and pacing across its six tracks stating, “The most aggressive bits bear texture, and the most billowing moments don’t float too far afield." Highlighting the track, Melting Sun II: Cherry Quartz as “regal and elevating", NPR’s All Song’s Considered wrote that the record at large “delivers the most fully realized heavy dream-pop album in recent memory."

== Track listing ==
All tracks are written by Markus Siegenhort.

“Melting Sun" track listing
No.	Title	Length
1.	"Melting Sun I: Azure Chimes"	7:22
2.	"Melting Sun II: Cherry Quartz"	9:41
3.	"Melting Sun III: Aquamarine Towers"	8:07
4.	"Melting Sun IV: Jade Fields"	6:29
5.	"Melting Sun V: Oneironaut"	2:52
6.	"Melting Sun VI: Golden Mind"	6:28
Total length:		40:47

A bonus track, Melting Sun VII, was released on a limited edition CD and DVD artbook by Prophecy Productions.

== Personnel ==
Credits adapted from the liner notes of Melting Sun

- Markus Siegenhort – vocals, guitars, bass
- Felix Wylezik – Drums
- Cedric Holler – Guitars, Vocals

Other personnel

- Philip Welsing - Mastering
- Pascal Hauer – Artwork and Layout
