= Sylvaine =

Norwegian metal solo project

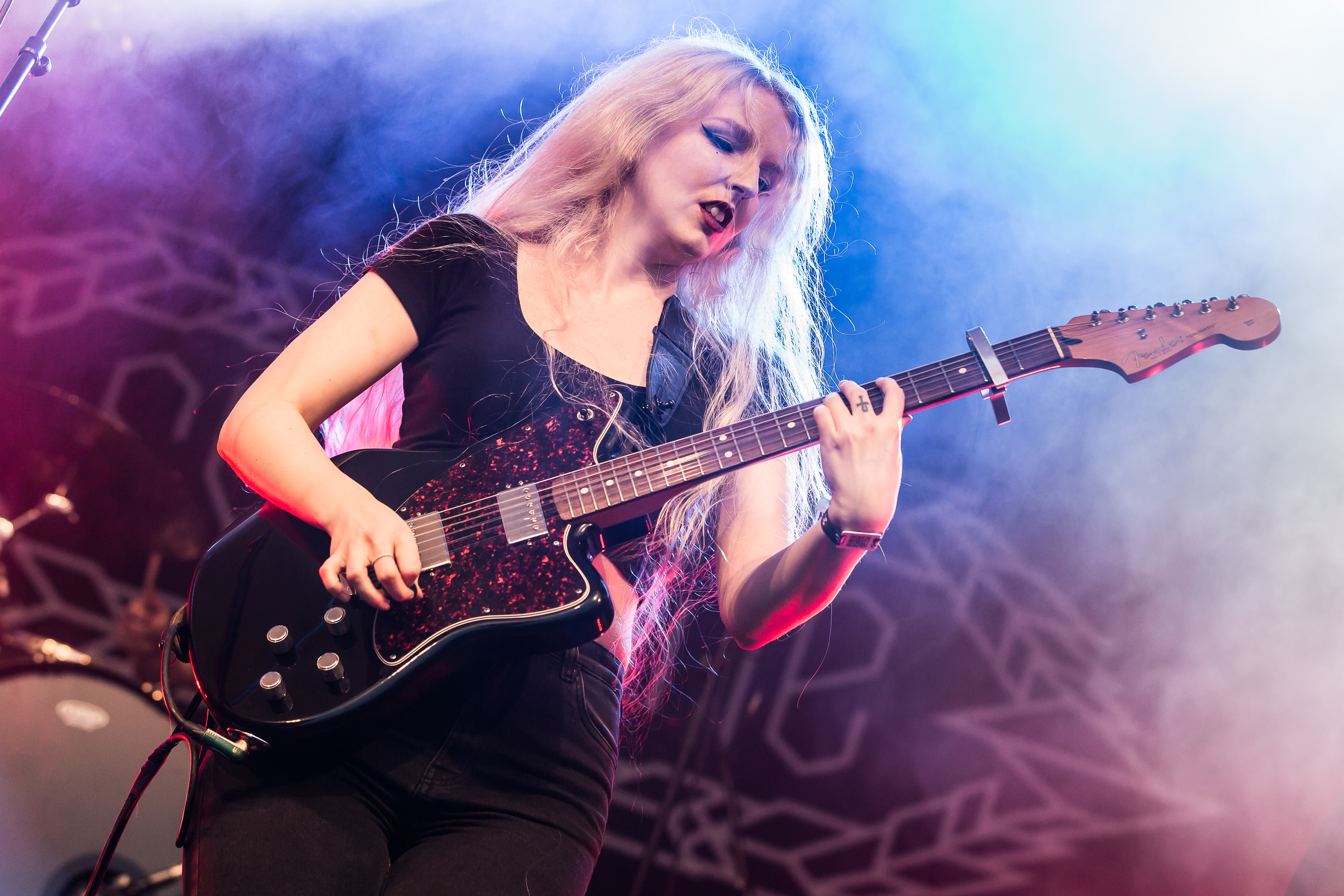
- Sylvaine performing at Full Force in 2023

Background information
- Origin: Oslo, Norway
- Genres: Black metal, blackgaze
- Years active: 2013–present
- Label: Season of Mist
- Members: Kathrine Shepard
- Website: sylvainemusic.com

Sylvaine is the solo music project of Norwegian metal multi-instrumentalist Kathrine Shepard. The project began in Oslo in 2013 and has released four albums to date. In 2019, Shepard became the first woman to earn a nomination for best metal album at the Spellemannprisen, for her third album, Atoms Aligned, Coming Undone (2018).

== History ==
Shepard was born in San Diego, California, in the United States in 1991 to a Norwegian mother and an American father before her family moved to Oslo at a young age. She is a classically-trained vocalist and received a bachelor's degree in musicology from the University of Oslo. The project's name Sylvaine was inspired by the word "sylvan" (meaning forest, woods) and the surname of French poet Paul Verlaine.

Shepard self-released her first album Silent Chamber, Noisy Heart in 2014 after writing it in Oslo from late 2012 to early 2013. She moved to Paris, France to write her second album Wistful, which was released in 2016 on the label Season of Mist. Alcest bandleader Neige played the drums on Wistful. Shepard met Neige after an Alcest concert in 2012 and toured with Alcest in 2014.

The third Sylvaine album Atoms Aligned, Coming Undone was released on 2 November 2018 and was preceded by the singles "Abeyance", "Mørklagt" and "L’Appel Du Vide". Neige also played the drums on the record. Atoms aligned, coming undone was nominated for a Norwegian Grammy Award for best metal album, with Shepard becoming the first female musician to earn a nomination in that category.

In 2019, Shepard provided guest vocals on the song "L’île des morts" from Alcest's sixth album Spiritual Instinct. In 2020, she released the split EP Time Without End in collaboration with post-black metal artist Unreqvited. Sylvaine's fourth album Nova was released in 2022. In autumn 2024, she toured Europe, supporting Faroese musician Eivør. Her debut album Silent Chamber, Noisy Heart was released as an anniversary version on the German label Eisenwald in November 2024, 10 years after its first release in 2014.

Shepard is a multi-instrumentalist who can play guitar, bass, piano and synthesiser. Her influences as a guitarist include Slowdive's Neil Halstead and Explosions in the Sky.

In February 2025, Sylvaine once again toured with Eivør, this time in Canada and the United States.

== Discography ==
=== Studio albums ===
- Silent Chamber, noisy Heart (2014)
- Wistful (2016)
- Atoms aligned, coming undone (2018)
- Nova (2022)

=== EPs ===
- Time without End (with Unreqvited) (2020)
- Eg Er Framand (2024)

=== Singles ===
- Abeyance (2018)
- Mørklagt (2018)
- Nowhere, still somewhere (2022)
- Mono no aware (2022)
- Nova (2022)
- Dagsens Auga Sloknar Ut (2024)
- Eg Er Framand (2024)

=== As a guest ===
- Background vocals on Alcest's Kodama (2016) and L’île des morts (2019)
- Vocals on ISON's Meridian (2021)
- Vocals on MØL's Diorama (2021)
- Vocals on Carpenter Brut's Stabat Mater (2022)
- Background vocals on Schammasch's The Maldoror Chants: Old Ocean (2024)
