= Lantlôs =

German metal band

- Origin: Rheda, Germany
- Genres: Alternative metal; post-metal; shoegaze; glitch-hop; blackgaze (early); post-black metal (early)
- Years active: 2005–present
- Label: Prophecy Productions
- Members: Markus Siegenhort; Felix Wylezik
- Past members: Angrrau; Tom Innocenti; Neige; Cedric Holler

Lantlôs is a German alternative metal band founded in 2005.

== History ==
Lantlôs was founded in 2005 by childhood friends Marcel Bochnig, going under the name "Markus 'Herbst' Siegenhort and "Anggrau" as an initially nameless black metal project. At the beginning, Herbst and Anggrau performed purely instrumentally, as neither was willing to take on vocals.

Before Lantlôs' first official release, Herbst played drums in the band Líam, whose first two EPs, My Journey to the Sky and Two Years and a Fragment, were released in 2007 and 2008, respectively. While their demo recording was solely the work of Anggrau and Herbst, Eïs singer Florian "Alboin" D., whom Herbst had met through an acquaintance, provided vocals as a session artist.

Due to differing views regarding the band's musical direction, which culminated in an unsuccessful session for the final mix of the debut, Herbst separated from Anggrau and Alboin before the release.

In 2010, Neige of Alcest and Amesoeurs took over as the vocalist for the band. With Neige as singer, the band released blackgaze albums .neon and Agape. Through a childhood acquaintance, a collaboration with label Prophecy Productions was established after their debut album was released, which the band has remained signed to since. For Agape, Herbst brought in drummer Felix Wylezik, as he himself was no longer able to play the instrument painlessly due to chronic tendonitis.

Neige left the band in 2013, with Herbst taking over vocals. The band released the album Melting Sun in 2014, followed by Wildhund seven years later. The band moved away from much of their black metal sound on these releases, instead focusing more on post-rock and shoegaze.

In 2026, Lantlôs released their sixth full length studio album, Nowhere In Between Forever.

== Members ==
=== Current ===
- Marcel Bochnig – drums (2005–2010), guitars, bass (2005–present), keyboards (2011–present), vocals (2013–present), electronics (2021–present)
- Felix Wylezik – drums (2010–present)

=== Past ===
- Angrrau – vocals, bass, piano (2005–2008)
- Tom Innocenti – vocals, guitars, keyboards (2008)
- Neige – vocals (2010–2013)
- Cedric Holler – guitars, vocals (2013–?)

== Discography ==
=== Albums ===
- Lantlôs (2008)
- .neon (2010)
- Agape (2011)
- Melting Sun (2014)
- Wildhund (2021)
- Nowhere In Between Forever (2026)

=== Demos ===
- Îsern Himel (2008)

=== Singles ===
- "Melting Sun I: Azure Chimes" (2014)
