= Tristesse =

Tristesse is a French word meaning sadness. Tristesse may also refer to:

- Bonjour Tristesse (Hello Sadness), a 1954 novel by Françoise Sagan
- Bonjour Tristesse (film), a 1958 film of the novel
- Tristesse Hivernale, a demo by black metal Neige-led band Alcest, released in 2001
- La Tristesse Durera (Scream to a Sigh), a 1993 single by the Manic Street Preachers
- Tristesse de la Lune (Sadness of the Moon), an electropop group founded by Kati Roloff and Gini Martin
- Tristesse, an album by Michel Jonasz
- Post-coital tristesse, a melancholic feeling that can sometimes occur following sexual intercourse
- Étude Op. 10, No. 3 (Chopin), a solo piano work composed by Frédéric Chopin, also known as Tristesse
- "Tristesse", a song from the 1993 Steve Hackett album Guitar Noir
- "Tristesse", a song from the 1985 album Heyday by The Church
- "Tristesse", a song from Kollektiv Turmstraße released in 2007 as a single and as part of the EP Tristesse
