= Shelter (Alcest album) =

Studio album by Alcest
- Released: 17 January 2014
- Studio: Sundlaugin (Mosfellsbær)
- Genres: Shoegaze; post-rock; dream pop
- Length: 45:36
- Languages: French; English
- Label: Prophecy Productions
- Producers: Birgir Jón Birgisson; Martin Koller

Alcest chronology
Les Voyages de l'âme (2012)	Shelter (2014)	Kodama (2016)

Singles from Shelter
- 1. "Opale" Released: 29 November 2013; 2. "Into the Waves" Released: 21 January 2014

Shelter is the fourth studio album by French post-black metal band Alcest. It was released on 17 January 2014 via Prophecy Productions. The album's title is related to its overall concept of shelter, "a safe place to escape, this secret thing we all have when life is going too fast and you are full of anxiety." Shelter marks a significant stylistic shift for the band, fully embracing the band's shoegaze and dream pop influences while departing from their previous black metal influences, with Rolling Stone writing that the album has "more in common genetically with Sigur Rós than Satyricon."

== Musical style, recording and writing ==
Shelter's style sees the band delving deeper into their shoegaze influences and "leaving metal behind" entirely. Rolling Stone compared the album to "If the Cocteau Twins discovered a long-lost triplet who had slugged it out in space-pop groups and post-rock bands", comparing the style to Slowdive, Mogwai, and Sigur Rós. According to AllMusic's Thom Jurek, "It is deeply indebted to its '90s British inspirational sources and wholly invested in the melodic sensibilities this group has displayed from the very beginning." Other critics have highlighted the post-rock influence on the album, comparing the closing track "Délivrance" to bands such as This Will Destroy You and God Is an Astronaut.

The concept of Shelter is encapsulated in the album's title. In an interview with Spin, Neige explained that "It's just a safe place to escape, this secret thing we all have when life is going too fast and you are full of anxiety", adding that "This shelter could be anything – a person, a movie, music. It's something that reminds you in a way of who you are, like a mirror, and convinces you to get lost." In a separate interview, he explained that "We all have things that are helping us. I wouldn't say that I'm a depressive person because I'm not, but I can have darker moments, and it really helps me. Shelter is about that." Neige found his shelter in the sea, saying "I love to spend time by the sea, just having very simple moments disconnected from the stress of everyday life and sitting on the beach and watching the waves."

Neige has discussed their choice to work with Birgir Jón Birgisson and record the album in Iceland, explaining that previous recording studios specialized in metal, whereas the band were interested in pursuing a different sound on this album. "We wanted to change our habits, and to take a bit more risks. On the previous record, we had this very clean, metal sound, very regular." He cited the studio's experience in recording with Sigur Rós as a factor in their decision. Neige also explained that "Iceland fit well with this concept of Shelter. It is a place that is isolated from everything, and it feels like being in a creative bubble all the time."

== Release and promotion ==
"Opale" was released as Shelter's lead single on 29 November 2013 with a music video. The second single, "Into the Waves" followed as seven-inch single on 21 January 2014.

In support of the album, the band toured across Europe in early 2014, as well as the United States and Mexico from September to October 2015 with Emma Ruth Rundle as a supporting act.

== Critical reception ==
Professional ratings
Aggregate scores
Source	Rating
AnyDecentMusic?	7.6/10
Metacritic	76/100
Review scores
Source	Rating
About.com	3.5/5 stars
AllMusic	3/5 stars
Consequence of Sound	B+
Exclaim!	9/10
Pitchfork	6.6/10
PopMatters	8/10
Sputnikmusic	4.5/5

Shelter was met with generally positive reviews from music critics upon its initial release. At Metacritic (a review aggregator site which assigns a normalized rating out of 100 from music critics), based on 13 critics, the album has received a score of 76, which indicates "generally positive reviews".

While several critics praised the dreamy atmosphere, guitar textures, and overall beauty of the album's style, the stylistic departure from the band's earlier blackgaze sound was a common point of contention. Exclaim! critic Dean Brown wrote a very positive review of the album, "Neige's ever-growing confidence as a songwriter has undoubtedly influenced his songwriting decisions for Shelter. And to call this album a "progression" for Alcest may be a bit of a leap—and so too would be calling Shelter a "brave" album. Shelter is less of a progression and more of a magnification of the beauteous, gentile side of Alcest and a complete suppression of the blackness at the heart of the band." In contrast, Pitchfork contributor Jason Heller argued in his review of the album that "Still capable of great feats of mood and beauty, Alcest have transformed themselves, although not always in the best way. They've gone from being a remarkably innovative, influential, and singular force in a subgenre they helped create to being just another shoegaze act. That doesn't make Shelter a bad album. As an aural analgesic, it goes down smooth and numbs what it needs to. But instead of tearing open the passageway between this world and whatever lies beyond, it shrinks that portal to the size of a keyhole." By contrast, writer Thom Jurek from AllMusic felt that there wasn't enough progress with their new direction in sound: "If there is criticism for Shelter, it's that it sounds as if Alcest are inching rather than stepping forward and stasis has a hold on them; but with the band's catalog as argument, that's deliberate. Musical movement aside, it's a lovely sounding record. Even in its self-conscious worship of shoegaze it could easily become a late addition to that genre's canon. Shelter is well-crafted, vulnerable, and honest."

== Track listing ==
All tracks are written by Neige.

Shelter track listing
No.	Title	Length
1.	"Wings"	1:32
2.	"Opale" ("Opal")	4:56
3.	"La nuit marche avec moi" ("The Night Walks with Me")	4:58
4.	"Voix sereines" ("Serene Voices")	6:44
5.	"L'Éveil des muses" ("The Awakening of the Muses")	6:49
6.	"Shelter"	5:29
7.	"Away" (featuring Neil Halstead)	5:02
8.	"Délivrance" ("Deliverance")	10:06
Total length:		45:36

Deluxe edition bonus track
No.	Title	Length
9.	"Into the Waves" (featuring Billie Lindahl)	6:31
Total length:		52:07

== Personnel ==
Credits adapted from the liner notes of Shelter.

Alcest

- Neige – vocals, guitar, bass, keyboards, percussion, glockenspiel
- Winterhalter – drums, percussion

Additional musicians

- Amiina – strings
  - Hildur Ársælsdóttir – violin
  - Edda Rún Ólafsdóttir – viola
  - Maria Huld Markan Sigfúsdóttir – violin
  - Sólrún Sumarliðadóttir – cello
- Neil Halstead – vocals
- Billie Lindahl – choir, vocals

Other personnel

- Birgir Jón Birgisson – arrangement, engineering, mixing, production
- Elisabeth Carlsson – assistant
- Andy Julia – picture
- William Lacalmontie – band photo
- Joe LaPorta – mastering
- Metastazis – layout
- MK – production
- Antoine Nouel – assistant
- Valnoir – layout

== Charts ==
Chart performance for Shelter
Chart (2014)	Peak position
Finnish Albums (Suomen virallinen lista)	17
German Albums (Offizielle Top 100)	28
