= Innern =

Studio album by Der Weg einer Freiheit
- Released: 12 September 2025
- Length: 43:09
- Label: Season of Mist
- Producer: Nikita Kamprad

Der Weg einer Freiheit chronology
Noktvrn (2021)	Innern (2025)

Singles from Innern
- 1. "Eos" Released: 16 July 2025; 2. "Marter" Released: 16 July 2025

Professional ratings
Review scores
Source	Rating
Blabbermouth.net	8.5/10
Metal Insider	(positive)
Metal Temple	(positive)
Metal-Roos	4.5/5
Noizze	8/10
The Razor's Edge	(positive)
Rock Hard	9/10
Spectrum Culture	79%
Sputnikmusic	4.5/5
Treble	(positive)

Innern is the sixth studio album by German extreme metal band Der Weg einer Freiheit. It was released by Season of Mist on 12 September 2025, and features production from band member Nikita Kamprad.

== Background and promotion ==
For Innern, Kamprad personally produced, engineered, and mixed it in his own studio. In an interview with New Noise Magazine, he said:

"It took a long time to be able to say I can do a full production myself for my band. I'm a kind of a control freak. After gathering (experience) throughout all the years, it was the perfect time to do it on my own. Everything worked out as precisely as we aimed for, which was not often the case when we worked with external producers."

Its first single, "Eos", was released on 16 July 2025. Its second and final single, "Marter", was released on 22 August 2025.

== Track listing ==
All tracks are written by and produced by Nikita Kamprad, with additional writers noted.

Track listing
No.	Title	Writer(s)	Length
1.	"Marter"	Tobias Schuler; Nicolas Rausch; Alan Noruspur	9:24
2.	"Xibalba"	Schuler; Rausch; Noruspur	10:07
3.	"Eos"	Schuler; Rausch; Noruspur; Viola Petsch	7:30
4.	"Fragment"	Schuler; Rausch; Noruspur	6:24
5.	"Finisterre III"		2:00
6.	"Forlorn"	Schuler; Rausch; Noruspur	7:44
Total length:			43:09
