= Les Chants de l'aurore =

Studio album by Alcest
- Released: 21 June 2024
- Genres: Blackgaze; post-black metal
- Length: 43:41
- Languages: French; Japanese
- Label: Nuclear Blast

Alcest chronology
Spiritual Instinct (2019)	Les Chants de l'aurore (2024)

Singles from Les Chants de l'aurore
- 1. "L'Envol" Released: 23 February 2024; 2. "Flamme jumelle" Released: 18 April 2024

Les Chants de l'aurore (transl. The Songs of Dawn) is the seventh studio album by French post-black metal band Alcest, released on 21 June 2024 by Nuclear Blast. The album was supported by the singles "L'Envol" and "Flamme Jumelle". The album received generally positive reviews from critics, and debuted at number 77 in France.

== Background and singles ==
Les Chants de l'Aurore is Alcest's second with Nuclear Blast, after their 2019 album Spiritual Instinct. Before writing the album, Neige, Alcest's primary songwriter, suffered from writer's block during the beginning of the COVID-19 pandemic. After a year, he broke out of it and wrote "L'Envol", which later became the lead single. Neige stated that he intentionally tried to emulate the lighter sound of Alcest's earlier albums, as he tended "to be quite melancholic in my daily life, so I [wanted] to make this kind of beautiful music to cheer myself up". Les Chants de l'Aurore was recorded at Neige's home instead of a studio. "L'Envol" was released as the lead single from Les Chants de l'Aurore on 23 February 2024. "Flamme Jumelle" followed on 18 April 2024, as the album's second single.

== Critical reception ==
Professional ratings
Aggregate scores
Source	Rating
Metacritic	77/100
Review scores
Source	Rating
Blabbermouth.net	8/10
Decibel	6/10
Exclaim!	7/10
Kerrang!	3/5
Metal Hammer	4/5 stars
Metal.de	8/10
MetalSucks	4/5 stars
Rock Hard	8.5/10

According to the review aggregator Metacritic, Les Chants de l'Aurore received "generally favorable reviews" based on a weighted average score of 77 out of 100 from four critic scores. Dom Lawson of Blabbermouth.net wrote that Les Chants de l'Aurore had "stunningly beautiful songs, performed with metal-friendly fire and intensity, but fully committed to the warmth of a new and positive dawn". Marko Djurdić wrote in Exclaim! that "while it still falls short of some of their most celebrated works, the album is gloriously cinematic, although never really surprising". Olly Thomas stated in a review for Kerrang! that the album "often feels like something of a journey, and if the specific destination is ambiguous, the direction is very much into the light". Matt Mills wrote in Metal Hammer that while the album went through "well trodden territory… [Alcest's] signature style still plucks heartstrings". Max Heilman criticized the album's mixing in a MetalSucks review, but stated that "Les Chants de l’Aurore remains plenty of examples of bonafide Alcest awesomeness".

== Track listing ==
All lyrics are written by Neige, except "L'Adieu", written by Guillaume Apollinaire; all music is composed by Neige and Winterhalter.

Les Chants de l'Aurore track listing
No.	Title	Length
1.	"Komorebi"	6:39
2.	"L'Envol"	8:02
3.	"Améthyste"	8:30
4.	"Flamme Jumelle"	5:18
5.	"Réminiscence"	2:51
6.	"L'Enfant de la Lune (月の子)"	7:29
7.	"L'Adieu"	4:52
Total length:		43:41

== Personnel ==
According to AllMusic:

Alcest

- Neige – vocals, guitar, bass, synthesizer, piano, glockenspiel, mixing, recording, arrangements
- Winterhalter – drums, percussion, sound engineering, recording

Additional contributors

- Elise Aranguren – additional vocals
- Chris Edrich – mixing
- Førtifem – layout
- Gregory Hoepffner – arrangements
- France Lafumat – additional vocals
- Gisli Gunnarsson – additional vocals, arrangements
- Mika Jussila – mastering
- Andy Julia – photography
- Yoann Lossel – cover art
- Haruna Nakaie – additional vocals, viola de gamba, Japanese spoken word
- Margot Gentil – additional vocals
- Sacha Gentil – additional vocals
- Ai Matsui – Japanese translation on "L'Enfant de la Lune"

== Charts ==
Chart performance for Les Chants de l'aurore
Chart (2024)	Peak position
Austrian Albums (Ö3 Austria)	19
Belgian Albums (Ultratop Flanders)	132
Belgian Albums (Ultratop Wallonia)	174
French Albums (SNEP)	77
German Albums (Offizielle Top 100)	14
UK Albums (Official Charts)	26
Scottish Albums (Official Charts)	36
Swiss Albums (Schweizer Hitparade)	22
UK Album Downloads (Official Charts)	16
UK Independent Albums (Official Charts)	8
UK Rock & Metal Albums (Official Charts)	3
UK Progressive Albums (Official Charts)	1
