= Les Voyages de l'âme =

Studio album by Alcest
- Released: January 6, 2012
- Studios: Klangschmiede Studio E, Mellrichstadt
- Genres: Blackgaze; post-black metal
- Length: 50:23
- Label: Prophecy Productions
- Producer: Martin Koller

Alcest chronology
Le Secret (EP, reissue) (2011)	Les Voyages de l'âme (2012)	Shelter (2014)

Singles from Les Voyages de l'âme
- 1. "Autre temps" Released: December 2, 2011

Les Voyages de l'âme (transl. The Journeys of the Soul) is the third studio album by French blackgaze band Alcest, released on January 6, 2012, by Prophecy Productions. An edited version of the song "Autre temps" was released as a single alongside an accompanying music video. The album was described as a musical synthesis of the previous two albums, blending shoegaze, post-rock, and black metal influences.

== Writing and musical style ==
The New York Times described the album's sound as "a kind of slow, pretty, gauzy metal, with highly managed guitar distortion, cathedral reverb and high, clear voices, except for when Neige sings in a barbed scream." AllMusic's Thom Jurek described the album as combining "black metal's buzz, gorgeous shoegaze melodies, ambient soundscapes, and post rock feedback", and as a synthesis of the styles of the previous two albums. He also notes that the aggressive elements are employed in a "celebratory manner", and that with the use of harsh, screamed vocals, "the melodic beauty of the guitars seems to open up that expression, ensuring balance." Neige consciously rejected comparisons to black metal, arguing that "It is not correct to label me as black metal because I did a few screams. There is nothing in my music about hate or angriness." In a number of interviews he has described it as the most progressive and ethereal Alcest album to date. He has also stated that on this album he was inspired by Yann Tiersen, Dead Can Dance, Summoning, and Burzum.

Neige has described the album as a continuation of his effort to describe his experiences of "another world" in visions as a child, and as "an attempt to explore this very strange esoteric experience." Les Voyages is inspired by these even more than any previous album, with Neige saying that "The goal of this album was to push the concept of the band to the maximum. All the lyrics are very clear this time because before I was speaking about this but taking other directions to avoid that stuff. But the lyrics of the new album are really speaking about this and nothing else."

Though the songwriting process for this album was quicker than on previous albums, it was also the most challenging for Neige. He explained that "I really wanted to make something good. I want to push further the limits of this music, and for me, this is the end of an era. This album is the summary of what I've done before. The concept has been pushed to a different level than before, and that's why it sounds so other-worldly and dreamy, I think. It's complex and very progressive in a way. I think it's very melodic, and I spent a lot of time in the melodies to find good riffs." He noted the title track as the most difficult song to compose, particularly structurally, adding that "I did six or seven versions of this song to find the right structure. I didn't spent a lot of time on the melodies for this one, but just on the structure, to find a way to gather all the riffs."

== Touring and promotion ==
The music video for the title track, "Les Voyages de l'âme"

Alcest began streaming the album in full online on January 4, 2012, two days in advance of the album's official release date. The band toured across Europe for much of early 2012 in support of the album, and in September 2012 they played in Nagoya, Osaka, and Tokyo in Japan for the first time.

A music video directed by Julien Marie for the song "Autre temps" was released on December 1, 2011. Neige was very involved in the video's direction, saying, "I gave him the directions. Where to go; what to speak about; what kind of images I wanted to have; casting. Pretty much everything had a direction. It's not me who filmed the video; it's him." He discussed the concept behind the video, explaining that it's about "the contrast between the fact that nature is moving, changing but still is here and will always be here. And the humans are just going here and disappearing very, very quickly. So it's very contrasted. But you can see many things. [...] And the ocean is the symbol of immortality in a way because life is the symbol of — water is the symbol of life." Following the release of the album, the band released a second video for the title track on May 21, 2012. The video was directed, edited, and written by Toshadeva Palani.

== Critical reception ==
Professional ratings
Aggregate scores
Source	Rating
AnyDecentMusic?	7.1/10
Metacritic	82/100
Review scores
Source	Rating
About.com	4.5/5 stars
AllMusic	4/5 stars
The New York Times	Positive
Pitchfork	6.9/10
PopMatters	9/10
Sputnikmusic	3.5/5 stars
Ultimate Guitar	7.7/10

Upon its initial release, Les Voyages de l'âme was met with very positive reviews from music critics. At Metacritic (a review aggregator site which assigns a normalized rating out of 100 from music critics), based on 10 critics, the album has received a score of 82, which indicates "universal acclaim".

Exclaim! critic Natalie Zina Walschots wrote a positive review of the album, concluding that "The music contains all of the trembling beauty fans have come to expect from Alcest, combined with a sense of vitality and wanderlust. Les Voyages de l'âme explores rather than pleads." They noted that where the previous album was very melancholic, Les Voyages... is characterised "by a strong forward movement and breathless, buoying optimism". Thom Jurek wrote a positive review of the album for AllMusic, writing that the album "is a conscious synthesis of the music from their two previous albums, rather than a move forward. And that's fine: assessment and integration and perfecting previous ideas are important aspects of any serious attempt at making art and creating a forward motion trajectory." He praised the improved production quality, and that "its ability to create emotions that approach bliss in now part of its sonic architecture". Pitchfork contributor Brandon Stosuy wrote a more lukewarm review, writing that "There's no denying the beauty, but it feels weirdly muted-- or perhaps just unsurprising." Stosuy nonetheless praised the album as "the most accomplished Alcest offering yet", noting the transition between "Beings of Light" and "Faiseurs de mondes" as the standout moment. PopMatters writer Brice Ezell commended the band for continuing to elude efforts to be pigeonholed to a particular genre, stating "It's clear from the group's output thus far that Alcest isn't trying to be a black metal band and, yet, for some reason, that genre is a consistent talking point in terms of the band's overall output. If that's the case, then Alcest could perhaps be called "post-black metal". But given that the critical scene is already dense with superfluous and unnecessary genre names, I'll go ahead and forego the need to label the band in that fashion. Needless to say, the sound of Alcest is one that represents a wholly unique mixture of metal and shoegaze, and Les Voyages de l'âme is a masterful demonstration of that sonic equation."

== Track listing ==
All lyrics are written by Neige except "Nous sommes l'émeraude" by Charles van Lerberghe; all music is composed by Neige.

Les Voyages de l'âme track listing
No.	Title	Length
1.	"Autre Temps" ("Another Time")	5:50
2.	"Là où naissent les couleurs nouvelles" ("Where the New Colors Are Born")	8:50
3.	"Les Voyages de l'âme" ("The Journeys of the Soul")	6:56
4.	"Nous sommes l'émeraude" ("We Are the Emerald")	4:20
5.	"Beings of Light"	6:11
6.	"Faiseurs de mondes" ("Makers of Worlds")	7:57
7.	"Havens"	2:10
8.	"Summer's Glory"	8:04
Total length:		50:23

== Personnel ==
Credits adapted from AllMusic.

Alcest

- Neige – vocals, guitars, bass, keyboards
- Winterhalter – drums

Additional personnel

- Martin "MK" Koller – production
- Neb Xort – mixing, mastering
- Markus Stock – engineer
- Fursy Teyssier – cover art
- Valnoir – design

== Charts ==
Chart performance for Les Voyages de l'âme
Chart (2012)	Peak position
UK Independent Album Breakers (OCC)	13
