= Neige (musician) =

French black metal musician

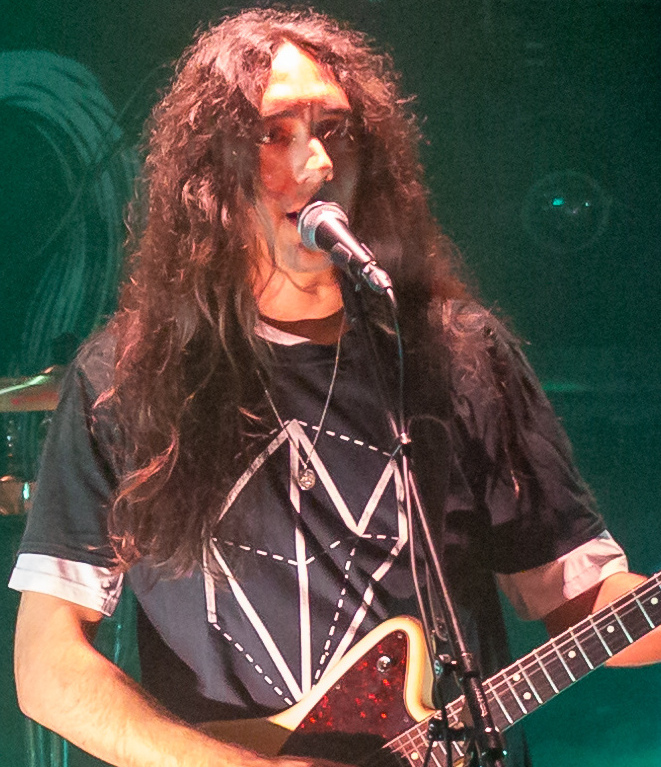
- Neige performing in 2020

Background information
- Born: Stéphane Paut; 16 April 1985 (age 41)
- Origin: Bagnols-sur-Cèze, France
- Genres: Shoegaze; blackgaze; black metal; post-metal; post-punk
- Instruments: Vocals; guitar; bass; drums; keyboards; percussion; glockenspiel
- Member of: Alcest
- Formerly of: Peste Noire, Amesoeurs, Lantlôs
- Website: www.alcestmusic.com

Stéphane Hugues Norbert Paut, known professionally as Neige (French: "Snow") (born 16 April 1985), is a French songwriter, singer, multi-instrumentalist musician, and record producer from Bagnols-sur-Cèze, now relocated to Paris. He is the primary songwriter, guitarist, lead vocalist, and the only continuous member of the post-black metal band Alcest and is the former guitarist, bass guitarist, and drummer of the post-punk/post-black metal band Amesoeurs.

== Career ==
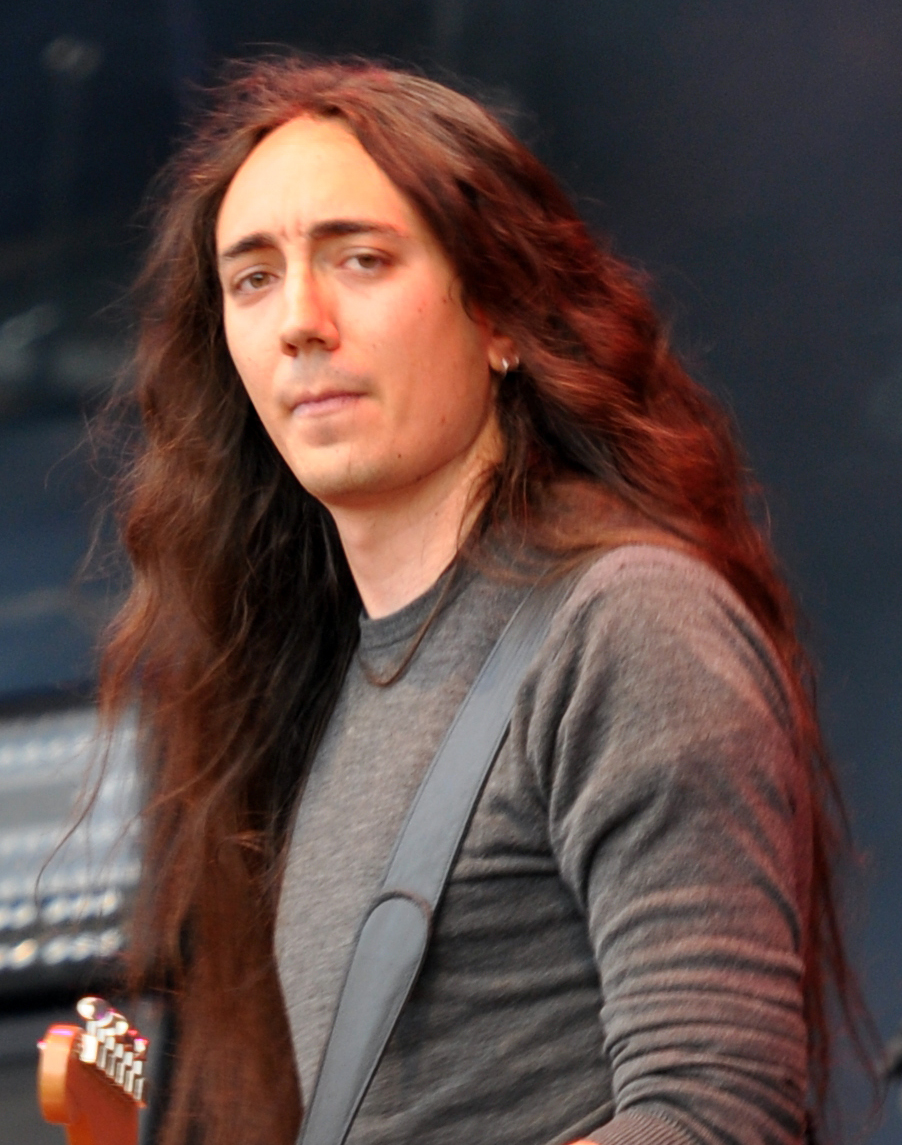
Neige performing in 2013

Neige quickly started to gain public recognition for his involvement as a vocalist, drummer and live rhythm guitarist for French black metal band Peste Noire at the beginning of the 2000s. At the same time, Peste Noire bandleader Famine was also the lead guitarist on the first Alcest demo, Tristesse hivernale. Neige has since condemned his tenure with Peste Noire, citing his disagreements with the band's far-right views and racist imagery.

He also became involved with black metal band Mortifera in 2003 up to the Vastiia Tenebrd Mortifera (2004) album for which he wrote two songs. In parallel, he started to make a name for himself with his main bands Amesoeurs and Alcest. Alcest's first EP Le Secret (Drakkar Productions; 2005) and album Souvenirs d'un autre monde (Prophecy Productions; 2007) mixing numerous shoegaze rock and metal influences skyrocketed Neige to fame, which led him to lay Amesoeurs to rest. Later he also provided vocals for Old Silver Key and Lantlôs and live bass for Les Discrets. In 2007, he was also asked by Rune Veddaa to make vocals on the forthcoming Forgotten Woods album entitled Intolerance Div. but this collaboration did not come to fruition.

== Discography ==
=== Alcest ===
==== Studio albums ====
- Rhythm guitar, drums, vocals on Tristesse hivernale (demo, 2001)
- Guitars, bass, drums, keyboards, vocals on Le secret (EP, 2005)
- Guitars, bass, drums, keyboards, vocals on Souvenirs d'un autre monde (2007)
- Guitars, bass, keyboards, vocals on Écailles de lune (2010)
- Guitars, bass, keyboards, vocals on Les Voyages de l'âme (2012)
- Guitars, bass, synth, vocals on Shelter (2014)
- Guitars, synth, vocals on Kodama (2016)
- Guitars, bass, synth, vocals on Spiritual Instinct (2019)
- Guitars, bass, synth, vocals, piano, glockenspiel on Les Chants de l'aurore (2024)

==== Split releases ====
- Guitars, bass, keyboard, vocals on Aux Funérailles du Monde.../Tristesse Hivernale with Angmar (2007)
- Guitars, bass, keyboard, vocals on Alcest / Les Discrets (2009)

=== Amesoeurs ===
==== Studio album ====
- Guitars, bass, keyboard, vocals on Ruines Humaines (EP, 2006)
- Guitars, bass, keyboard, vocals on Amesoeurs (2009)

==== Split releases ====
- Guitars, bass, keyboard, vocals on Valfunde/Amesoeurs

=== Glaciation ===
- Vocals on 1994 (EP, 2012)

=== Mortifera ===
- Drums, guitars, bass on Complainte d'une Agonie Celeste (EP, 2003)
- Drums, guitars, bass on Vastiia Tenebrd Mortifera (2004). Neige wrote "Ciel Brouillé" and "Le Revenant".

=== Peste Noire ===
- Drums on Aryan Supremacy (demo, 2001)
- Drums on Macabre Transcendance... (demo, 2002)
- Drums on Phalènes et Pestilence – Salvatrice Averse (demo, 2003)
- Drums and bass on Phalènes et Pestilence (demo, 2005)
- Main vocals on "Dueil Angoisseus", drums on "Nous sommes fanés", drums and bass on "Des médecins malades et des saints séquestrés" and organ on "Phalènes et pestilence..." on La Sanie des siècles – Panégyrique de la dégénérescence (2006)
- Vocals and rhythm guitars on "La Césarienne" and acoustic guitar introduction to "Amour ne m'amoit ne je li" on Folkfuck Folie (2007)
- Bass on ballade cuntre lo anemi francor (2009)

=== Phest ===
- Guitars on L'immobile (2003)
- Guitars on Harmonia (2004)

=== Lantlôs ===
- Vocals on Neon (2010)
- Vocals on Agape (2011)

=== Old Silver Key ===
- Vocals on Tales of Wanderings (2011)

=== As a guest ===
- Guest vocals on Deafheaven's Sunbather (2013)
- Guest drums on Sylvaine's Wistful (2014)
- Guest vocals on Déluge's Æther (2015)
- Guitarist live-world premiere with Empyrium
- Guest vocals on Heretoir's The Circle (2017)
- Co-arrangement on "Lyon - Paris 7h34" on Les Discrets' Prédateurs (2017)
- Guest drums on Sylvaine's album Atoms Aligned, Coming Undone (2018)
- Guest vocals on "Forgotten Paths" on Saor's Forgotten Paths (2019)
- Guest vocals on ISON's INNER - SPACE.
- Guest vocals on Harakiri for the Sky's Sing for the Damage We've Done (2020)
