= Alcest / Les Discrets =

EP by Alcest and Les Discrets
- Released: November 30, 2009
- Genres: Shoegaze, post-metal
- Length: 27:04
- Label: Prophecy Productions

Alcest chronology
Souvenirs d'un autre monde (2007)	Alcest / Les Discrets (2009)	Écailles de Lune (2010)

Les Discrets chronology
Alcest / Les Discrets (2009)	Septembre et Ses Dernières Pensées (2010)

Alcest / Les Discrets (or Les Discrets / Alcest) is a split EP by French shoegaze bands Alcest and Les Discrets, released on November 30, 2009, by Prophecy Productions.

This is the release debut of Les Discrets; its leader Fursy Teyssier have previously worked with Alcest leader Neige numerous times, either as musician or cover artist. It is the first Alcest work of to feature drummer Winterhalter, although he only performed on Les Discrets' songs; he would join Alcest later the same year.

== Track listing ==
All tracks are written by Neige.

Side one: Alcest
No.	Title	Length
1.	"Percées de lumière" ("Breakthroughs of Light")	6:32
2.	"Circe Poisoning the Sea"	3:03
Total length:		9:35

All lyrics are written by Audrey Hadorn; all music is composed by Fursy Teyssier.

Side two: Les Discrets
No.	Title	Length
1.	"L'Échappée" ("The Breakaway")	4:11
2.	"Après l'ombre" ("After the Shadow')	6:39
3.	"Song for Mountains (demo)"	6:39
Total length:		17:29

== Personnel ==
Alcest

- Neige – lead vocals, guitar, bass, synthesizer, drums

Les Discrets

- Fursy Teyssier – lead vocals, guitar, bass
- Audrey Hadorn – vocals
- Winterhalter – drums

Production

- Fursy Teyssier – cover art
