= Tristesse hivernale =

Demo album by Alcest
- Released: 2001
- Recorded: 2000–2001
- Genre: Black metal
- Length: 21:25
- Label: Drakkar

Alcest chronology
Tristesse hivernale (2001)	Le Secret (2005)

Tristesse hivernale (English: "Wintry Sadness") is a demo and release debut of French band Alcest, released in 2001 on Drakkar Productions. It is their only release with guitarist Aegnor and bass guitarist Argoth, both from Peste Noire (in which Aegnor later changed his alias to Famine), as the band's creator, Neige, would continue Alcest as a one-man project after the release. It remains the band's only release as a trio.

Unlike the following albums which would be influenced by shoegaze and post-metal, Tristesse hivernale is oriented towards traditional black metal with a raw sound and harsh vocals. It was later re-released by Northern Silence Productions in August 2007 as a split release with another French black metal band, Angmar, under the name Aux funérailles du monde... / Tristesse hivernale.

== Track listing ==
All lyrics are written by Neige; all music is composed by Neige except "La Forêt de cristal" by Neige and Aegnor.

No.	Title	Length
1.	"Tristesse hivernale" ("Wintry Sadness")	3:50
2.	"La Forêt de cristal" ("The Crystal Forest")	4:38
3.	"En mémoire aux valeureux guerriers" ("In Memory of the Brave Warriors")	5:24
4.	"La Mort plane sur ces contrées glacées" ("The Death Glides Over These Frozen Lands")	7:33
Total length:		21:25

== Personnel ==
- Neige – vocals, guitars, keyboards, drums
- Aegnor – lead guitar
- Argoth – bass
