= Spiritual Instinct =

Studio album by Alcest
- Released: 25 October 2019
- Studios: Drudenhaus Studio, (Nantes)
- Genres: Blackgaze; post-black metal
- Length: 40:59
- Language: French
- Label: Nuclear Blast

Alcest chronology
Kodama (2016)	Spiritual Instinct (2019)	Les Chants de l'aurore (2024)

Singles from Spiritual Instinct
- 1. "Protection" Released: 23 August 2019; 2. "Sapphire" Released: 27 September 2019

Spiritual Instinct is the sixth studio album by French post-black metal band Alcest. The album was released on 25 October 2019 through Nuclear Blast and garnered positive reviews from critics. Spiritual Instinct features Alcest live bassist Indria Saray performing on bass in the studio for the second time in the history of the band after Kodama.

== Background and release ==
After the release of the band's fifth studio album Kodama (2016), Alcest departed from Prophecy Productions and signed with Nuclear Blast on 10 April 2019 in anticipation for the release of their sixth studio album. On 23 August 2019, "Protection" was released as the album's lead single. "Sapphire", the second single, followed on 27 September 2019.

== Critical reception ==
Spiritual Instinct was released to a positive critical reception, with Metacritic, a review aggregation website that assigns normalised ratings out of 100, determined a score of 82 based on four critics, indicating "Universal Acclaim". Sam Law, writing for British rock magazine Kerrang!, gave a rating of 4/5, noting that while the album was fundamentally sound and well produced, it was inferior to Alcest's earlier work. This concern was echoed by other critics, including Lukas Wojcicki of Canadian music publication Exclaim!, and Jason Roche of heavy metal news site Blabbermouth.net. Nonetheless, most reviewers concluded that the album was enjoyable and a worthy addition to Alcest's discography.

== Track listing ==
All tracks are written by Neige.

Spiritual Instinct track listing
No.	Title	Length
1.	"Les Jardins de minuit" ("The Midnight Gardens")	7:53
2.	"Protection"	5:49
3.	"Sapphire"	5:00
4.	"L'Île des morts" ("Isle of the Dead")	9:04
5.	"Le Miroir" ("The Mirror")	5:31
6.	"Spiritual Instinct"	7:42
Total length:		40:59

== Personnel ==
Alcest

- Neige – guitar, vocals, keyboards, illustration, art direction
- Winterhalter – drums, percussion

Other personnel

- Indria Saray – bass guitar
- Kathrine Shepard – vocals on "L'île des morts"
- Benoît Roux – recording, production, mixing
- Mika Jussila – mastering
- William Lacalmontie – photograph
- Førtifem – layout, illustration, art direction

== Charts ==
Chart performance for Spiritual Instinct
Chart (2019)	Peak position
Austrian Albums (Ö3 Austria)	63
Belgian Albums (Ultratop Flanders)	92
Finnish Albums (Suomen virallinen lista)	34
French Albums (SNEP)	106
German Albums (Offizielle Top 100)	12
Scottish Albums (Official Charts)	78
Swiss Albums (Schweizer Hitparade)	30
UK Album Downloads (Official Charts)	57
UK Independent Albums (Official Charts)	22
UK Rock & Metal Albums (Official Charts)	7
US Heatseekers Albums (Billboard)	6
