= Heretoir =

German metal band

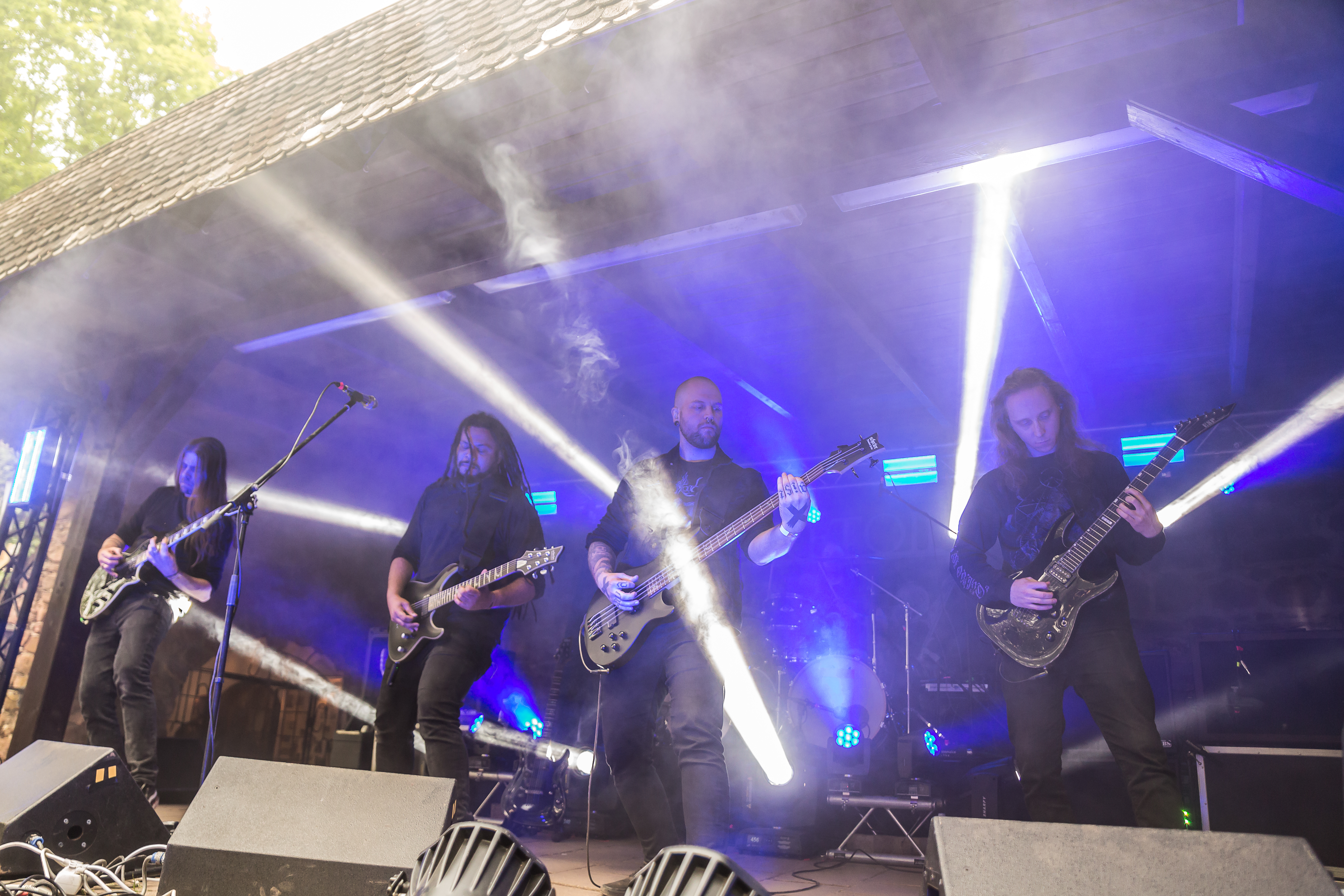
- Heretoir in 2023

Background information
- Origin: Augsburg, Germany
- Genres: Black metal; post-rock; shoegaze
- Years active: 2006–present
- Labels: Northern Silence; Pest

Heretoir is a band formed in Augsburg in 2006 that combines post-rock and shoegazing influences with modern metal.

== History ==
The band was founded in 2006 as a solo project by David "Eklatanz" C. (ex-Agrypnie). In 2008, the self-produced demo Existenz was released on the Chinese label Pest Productions, and in 2009 it was released again under the new title .Existenz. EP.

On February 25, 2011, the self-titled debut album Heretoir was released through Northern Silence Productions. It contains nine pieces with a play time of just over 50 minutes. The album cover was designed by the well-known French artist Fursy Teyssier (ex-Alcest, ex-Amesoeurs, Empyrium live, Les Discrets). The album artwork was created by the French artist Metastazis, who had previously worked for artists such as Alcest, As I Lay Dying, Enthroned, Gorgoroth, Morbid Angel, Paradise Lost, Secrets of the Moon and The Black Dahlia Murder. The lyrics and concept of the album are intended to reflect the thoughts and feelings of a protagonist who has lost a loved one, providing insight into the fine line between grief, longing, anger and hope.

In October 2011, Heretoir played with the help of the newly-joined musicians Maximilian "M.F." (live guitar) and Emanuel "Belial" D. (live drums) at the Autumn Depression Festival in Essen. Following that, it didn't take long for the band to share stages with bands such as Agalloch, Alcest, Graveworm, Negură Bunget, Sólstafir, Secrets of the Moon and Vreid at numerous concerts and festivals such as the Fimbul Festival 2012.

Around the time of the band's first concerts, the EP . Existence. was completely re-recorded. Combining the original version and numerous bonus tracks, this re-recording was released on August 24, 2012 under the title Substance through Northern Silence Productions.

After a first tour in March 2013 (Aetas Cineris Tour 2013 with Agrypnie and Der Weg einer Freiheit) through Germany, Austria and Switzerland the band played in 2014 and 2015 at renowned festivals such as the Summer Breeze Festival and the Rockharz Open Air. At the same time, the band worked on the completion of their second studio album, The Circle, which was released on March 24, 2017 through Northern Silence Productions.

In the wake of the release of The Circle, the band went on an extensive European tour in May and June 2017 together with Ghost Bath and King Apathy, which included concerts in over 15 European countries. Furthermore, Heretoir played three German tour shows together with Imperium Dekadenz in November 2017 as the opener of the Norwegian Enslaved and went on another ten-day European tour in December 2017 with the bands Kalmah, Nothgard and Lost In Grey.

On October 6, 2023, their third studio album Nightsphere was released through Northern Silence Productions. It was produced and mixed by David German and Justin Felder, with Nikita Kamprad mastering. It is the first album on which all band members have participated in the songwriting. The album was presented in five countries on the European tour of the same name. They were accompanied by Firtan and Outlaw.

Their fourth studio album Solastalgia was released in 2025 on AOP Records.

== Discography ==
=== Studio albums ===
- Heretoir (2011)
- The Circle (2017)
- Nightsphere (2023)
- Solastalgia (2025)

=== EPs ===
- Existenz Demo (2008)
- .Existenz. EP (2009)
- Wastelands (2023)

=== Compilations ===
- Substanz (2012)

=== Split albums ===
- The World Comes to an End in the End of a Journey (2009)
- Wiedersehen – unsere Hoffnung (2010)

=== Singles ===
- "Just for a Moment" (2014)
- "Golden Dust" (Acoustic Version; feat. Emily Highfield) (2019)
- "Graue Bauten" (2022)
- "Fatigue" (2023)
- "Anima" (2023)
- "Wastelands "(2023)
- "At Dusk" (2023)
- "Twilight of the Machines" (feat. Austere) (2023)
- "Glacierheart – Nightsphere, Pt. 2" (feat. Der Weg einer Freiheit) (2023)
- "The Same Hell" (2024)
- "The Ashen Falls" (2025)
- "Season of Grief" (2025)
- "You Are the Night" (2025)
