= Der Weg einer Freiheit =

German metal band

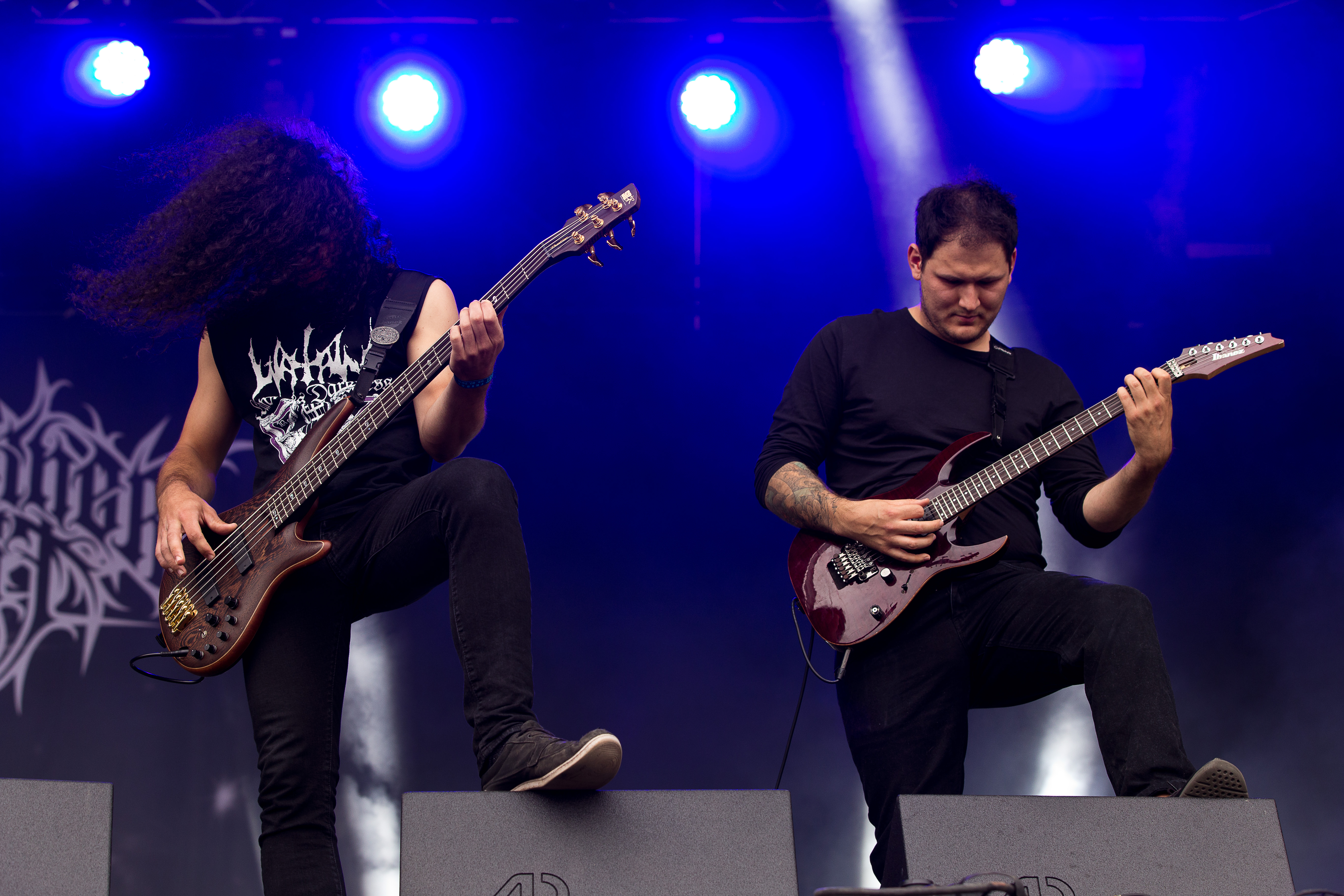
- Der Weg einer Freiheit at Rockharz Open Air 2016

Background information
- Origin: Würzburg, Bavaria, Germany
- Genres: Black metal; post-metal
- Years active: 2009–present
- Labels: Viva Hate; Season of Mist
- Members: Nikita Kamprad; Tobias Schuler; Nico Rausch; Nico Ziska
- Past members: Tobias Jaschinsky; Christian Bass; Giuliano Barbieri; Sascha Rissling
- Website: derwegeinerfreiheit.de

Der Weg einer Freiheit ("The Way of a Freedom") is a German extreme metal band from Würzburg, formed in 2009 by Tobias Jaschinsky as vocalist and Nikita Kamprad as guitarist and principal songwriter. After the release of two studio albums – Der Weg einer Freiheit (2009) and Unstille (2012) – Jaschinsky left the band in 2012 and Kamprad took over vocals. He now performs alongside guitarist Nico Rausch, bassist Nico Ziska and drummer Tobias Schuler. They have released four more studio albums – Stellar (2015), Finisterre (2017), Noktvrn (2021), and Innern (2025) – through Season of Mist.

Der Weg einer Freiheit have toured extensively since formation, sharing stages with bands such as Wolves in the Throne Room, The Ocean and Heaven Shall Burn. They identify with black metal, but also embrace other musical influences and lack some traditional features of the genre, such as Satanist lyrical themes.

== History ==
Tobias Jaschinsky and Nikita Kamprad first met when they played together in the black metal band Frostgrim, which split up half a year after Jaschinsky joined it due to musical difficulties between the members. The two then formed the deathcore band Fuck Your Shadow from Behind, which existed from 2007 until 2010. In 2009, they started Der Weg einer Freiheit with Jaschinsky as vocalist and Kamprad on guitars and other instruments. That February they released their self-titled debut album, limited to 200 physical copies. They used a drumcomputer for recording drum lines. The album was re-released via Viva Hate Records in May 2010 after the songs were re-recorded with Christian Bass, who became the band's first drummer.

On 1 July 2011, Der Weg einer Freiheit released their first EP Agonie through Viva Hate. During the recording, Christian Bass left due to health issues to be replaced by Tobias Schuler. By this point, the band had toured with bands such as Despised Icon, The Black Dahlia Murder, Wolves in the Throne Room, Neaera and War From a Harlots Mouth. In 2011, they played at Barther Metal Open Air and Wolfszeit Festival alongside Skyforger, Finsterforst, Postmortem, Kromlek, Svartsot, Eisregen, Wolfchant, Equilibrium, Heidevolk, Varg and Watain. In 2012, the band released their second full-length album Unstille, performed at Extremefest in St. Pölten and Hünxe and toured alongside The Black Dahlia Murder and Darkest Hour. In October 2012, Jaschinsky left the band and Kamprad took over the role of lead vocalist. In March 2013 Der Weg einer Freiheit toured with Heretoir in Germany, Austria and Switzerland. That summer they played Ragnarök Festival and Summer Breeze. In 2014, they toured with The Ocean and appeared at With Full Force.

In 2015, the band released their third album Stellar via Season of Mist and toured throughout Europe with fellow German band Downfall of Gaia. They played Hellfest and Graspop Metal Meeting the same year; their first US tour was cancelled due to visa issues. In 2016, the band played their first European headlining tour and in the summer appeared at Wacken Open Air for the first time and was part of the Full Metal Cruise line-up. In August 2017 Sascha Rissling parted with the band to concentrate on other musical projects, and bassist Giuliano Barbieri followed in September. The band toured Europe with Portuguese band Moonspell as a trio, with pre-recorded basslines.

After the tour, Der Weg einer Freiheit started recording their fourth album, Finisterre, which was released in late 2017. The album peaked at No. 82 on the German Albums charts. Returning from the studio, the band toured with Heaven Shall Burn. During this tour, Nico Ziska became new bass player of the band. The band performed with former member Nico Rausch on several summer festivals.

== Musical style ==
Der Weg einer Freiheit are strongly influenced by the Scandinavian style of black metal. Their music has been compared with Agrypnie, their vocal style to that of Nocturno Culto of Darkthrone. Frontman and principal songwriter Nikita Kamprad named bands such as 1349, Orlog, Nocte Obducta, Negator, Imperium Dekadenz, Nagelfar, Drautran, Emperor, and Dissection as musical references. He also stated that he tries to follow a more progressive direction than that of his former band Frostgrim.

The band's lyrics are written in German and focus on feelings of despair, memories, and the darker aspects of human society. Although Der Weg einer Freiheit describe themselves as a black metal band, they have no interest in the Satanist themes traditionally associated with the genre.

== Discography ==
Studio albums

- 2009: Der Weg einer Freiheit
- 2012: Unstille
- 2015: Stellar
- 2017: Finisterre
- 2021: Noktvrn
- 2025: Innern

EPs

- 2011: Agonie
- 2012: "Wacht"/"In die Weiten"

Live albums

- 2019: Live in Berlin

== Members ==
Current

- Nikita Kamprad – guitar (2009–present), vocals (2012–present), keyboards (2021–present), bass guitar (2009–2012), drum programming (2009–2010)
- Nico Rausch – guitar (2017–present)
- Nico Ziska – bass guitar (2017–present)
- Tobias Schuler – drums (2011–present)

Former

- Tobias Jaschinsky – vocals (2009–2012)
- Christian Bass – drums (2010–2011)
- Guiliano Barbieri – bass guitar (2012–2016)
- Sascha Rissling – guitar (2012–2017)

Timeline
