= Souvenirs d'un autre monde =

Studio album by Alcest
- Released: 8 August 2007
- Genres: Shoegaze; post-metal; blackgaze
- Length: 41:20
- Label: Prophecy Productions
- Producer: Martin Koller

Alcest chronology
Le secret (2005)	Souvenirs d'un autre monde (2007)	Alcest / Les Discrets (2009)

Souvenirs d'un autre monde (transl. Memories From Another World) is the debut studio album by French post-black metal band Alcest, released on 8 August 2007. The title refers to the meaning behind the music of Alcest, as its leader and songwriter, Neige, sees it as a journey through his memories of a distant world he has been in contact with.

Although it is representative of future works, the album differs notably from Alcest's first EP Le Secret (2005), distancing from Alcest's original sound, and delving into a post-metal and shoegaze-influenced direction while maintaining black metal elements in the music. It is the last release in which Neige plays all instruments, as drummer Winterhalter joined him on subsequent releases.

== Reception ==
Professional ratings
Review scores
Source	Rating
AllMusic	4/5 stars
Blabbermouth.net	7.5/10
PopMatters	8/10 stars
Revolver	Positive
Sputnikmusic	2.5/5 stars
Ultimate Guitar	7.3/10

Souvenirs d'un autre monde received generally positive reviews. Brian Way of AllMusic lauded the emotional aspect of the album, stating it expressed "yearning, nostalgia, triumph, and blissful peace, all without a single lyric in (discernible) English". Many reviewers noted the unique stylistic influences on the album, with Brad Angle of Revolver describing the album as "unexpectedly profound and affecting. Where many black metal records tunnel inward to the dark centers of their authors, Souvenirs d'un autre monde looks outward and upward, encouraging the listener to release its grasp on reality and float into the ether."

Kyle Ward of Sputnikmusic was less impressed with the album, writing that "The ideas presented in Souvenirs d'un autre monde are solid, and rather revolutionary for the genre, but the songwriting is so blatantly flawed that any hope of this fantastic idea coming to realization are swiftly carried away, never to return again."

In 2016, Pitchfork ranked the album at number 32 in its list of "The 50 Best Shoegaze Albums of All Time", saying:

"The blur of black metal and the blur of shoegaze: When both genres began flourishing in the early 1990s, the similarities weren’t readily apparent. But by the early 2000s, their convergence seemed inevitable. The French musician Neige drifted away from the black metal scene in 2005 with the debut EP from his melodic, melancholic band Amesoeurs, but it took the first full-length by his next project—Souvenirs d'un autre monde by Alcest—to consummate his dual passions for black metal and shoegaze. The 2007 album's title translates as "memories from another world"—accordingly, Neige imbued its six tracks with translucent acoustic guitars, sky-shaking thunderheads of distortion, and tender, wispy harmonies. The songwriting reaches for the cosmos, even as the record's propulsive intensity is a constant reminder of Alcest's metal ancestry. At the same time, it reinvented shoegaze for a new century, proving just how renewable a sonic resource it could be."

== Track listing ==
All tracks are written by Neige.

Souvenirs d'un autre monde track listing
No.	Title	Length
1.	"Printemps émeraude" ("Emerald Spring")	7:19
2.	"Souvenirs d'un autre monde" ("Memories From Another World")	6:08
3.	"Les Iris" ("The Irises")	7:41
4.	"Ciel errant" ("Wandering Sky")	7:12
5.	"Sur l'autre rive je t'attendrai" ("On the Other Shore I Will Wait for You")	6:50
6.	"Tir nan Og" (Irish: "Land of the Young")	6:10
Total length:		41:20

== Personnel ==
Alcest

- Neige – vocals, guitars, bass, keyboards, drums

Additional personnel

- Audrey Sylvain – vocals on "Sur l'autre rive je t'attendrai"
- Fursy Teyssier – artwork
