= Le secret (EP) =

2005 EP by Alcest

EP by Alcest
- Released: 1 May 2005
- Recorded: 2005
- Genre: Blackgaze
- Length: 27:19
- Label: Drakkar

Alcest chronology
Tristesse hivernale (2001)	Le secret (2005)	Souvenirs d'un autre monde (2007)

2011 re-recording cover

Le secret (French for "The Secret") is an extended play by French blackgaze band Alcest, released on 1 May 2005 through Drakkar Productions. It is Alcest's first release with creator Neige as sole member, as former members Aegnor and Argoth both left after the 2001 demo Tristesse hivernale, and the only release with Neige as sole performer.

== Background and release ==
According to Michael Nelson, Neige was a pioneer of the fusion genre blackgaze, classifying Le secret as "the birth of blackgaze". He noted that it sounded "like a Cocteau Twins/Burzum collaborative split" and that "[r]oughly half the time, vocals were delivered in an angelic coo; the other half, they were a raw, distant shriek".

Neige wrote the title track when he was 17 years old and considers it the first song he wrote for Alcest, without considering the songs written for Tristesse hivernale. The lyrics of the track "Élévation" come from the eponymous poem by Charles Baudelaire's from his 1857 volume of poetry Les Fleurs du mal. The album was re-recorded and re-released in 2011, with the involvement of drummer Winterhalter.

== Track listing ==
Le secret original track listing
No.	Title	Writer(s)	Length
1.	"Le secret" ("The Secret")	Neige	14:33
2.	"Élévation" ("Elevation")	Charles Baudelaire; Neige	12:46
Total length:			27:19

Le secret reissue track listing
No.	Title	Writer(s)	Length
1.	"Le Secret" (2011 re-recording)	Neige	13:32
2.	"Élévation" (2011 re-recording)	Charles Baudelaire; Neige	13:26
3.	"Le secret" (original)	Neige	14:33
4.	"Élévation" (original)	Baudelaire; Neige	12:46
Total length:			54:17

== Critical reception ==
Professional ratings
Review scores
Source	Rating
AllMusic	4/5 stars
Pitchfork	6.0/10

Although the original release received little to no attention from critics, the 2011 re-recorded version of the EP received positive reviews. Thom Jurek of AllMusic, stated that "it remains a very special record, as it lays out in total the first aural manifesto that all the work of Alcest to date was based upon, and shows just how far apart the unit is, in content and form, from other shoegaze metal acts. This is the door to a powerful, poetic, unsettling world of bliss that still challenges the sense of hearing even as it delights".

In 2013, Decibel ranked Le secret at number 90 on its list of the Top 100 Black Metal Albums of All Time.

== Personnel ==
Original

- Neige – vocals, guitars, bass, keyboards, drums

2011 version

- Neige – vocals, guitar, bass, keyboards
- Winterhalter – drums
