= Alcest =

French blackgaze/post-metal band

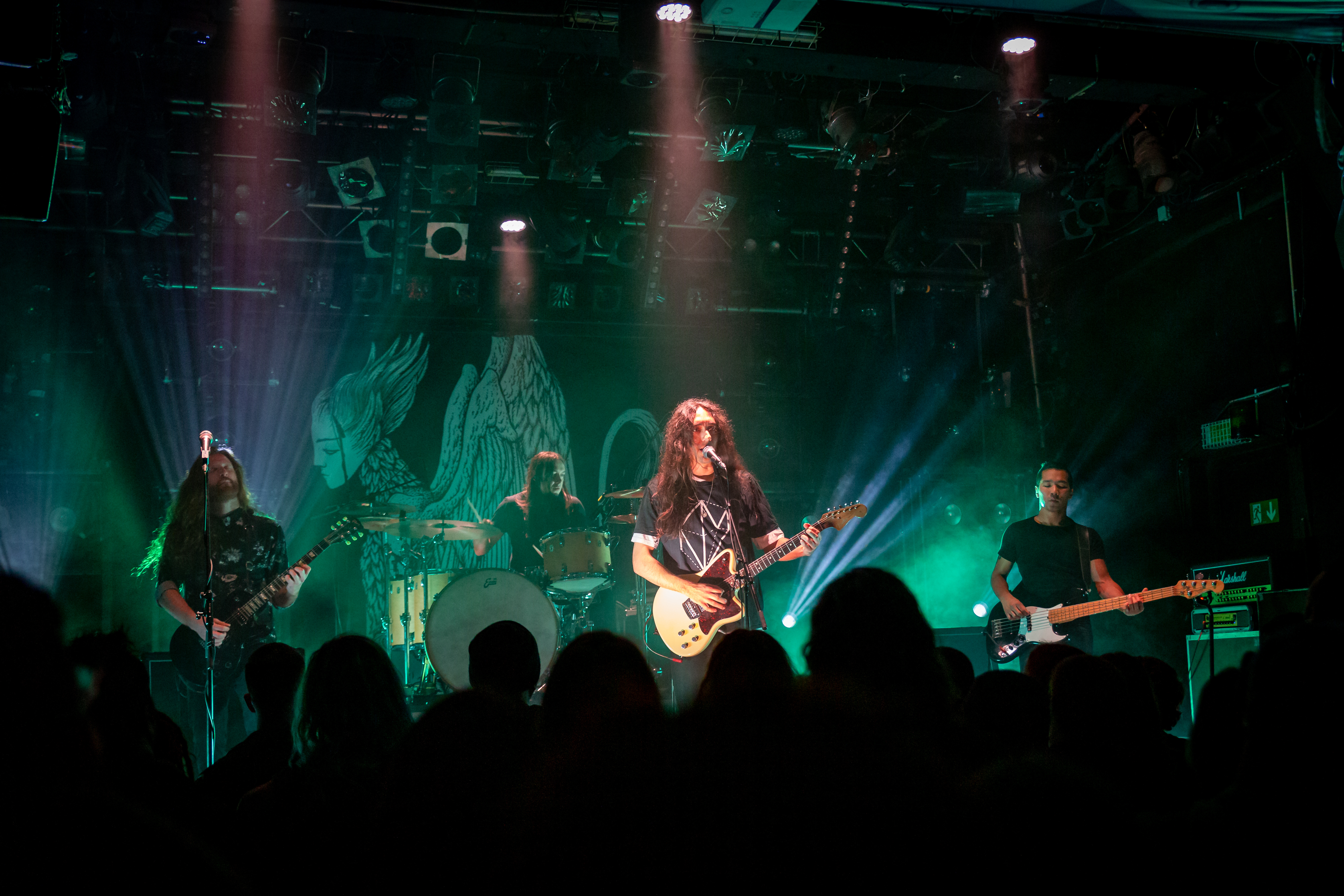
- Alcest performing in 2020. From left to right: Zero, Winterhalter, Neige, Indria Saray

Background information
- Origin: Bagnols-sur-Cèze, France
- Genres: Post-black metal; blackgaze; shoegaze; black metal (early)
- Years active: 2000–present
- Labels: Nuclear Blast; Hyperrealist; Drakkar; Northern Silence; Prophecy
- Spinoffs: Amesoeurs
- Members: Neige; Winterhalter
- Past members: Aegnor; Argoth
- Website: alcestmusic.com

Alcest (/ɑːlˈsɛst/) is a French post-black metal band from Bagnols-sur-Cèze, founded and led by Neige (Stéphane Paut). It began in 2000 as Neige's black metal solo project that became a trio. Members Aegnor and Argoth left the band following the 2001 release of their first demo, leaving Neige as the sole member. Neige incorporated shoegaze and post-metal into the project's sound from 2005 onwards. In 2009, drummer Winterhalter from Les Discrets joined Alcest, after eight years with Neige as its sole full-time member.

Alcest has released seven studio albums and three EPs. Their fourth album, 2014's Shelter, shifted towards shoegaze, while subsequent album Kodama (2016) returned to blackgaze. Alcest is credited with pioneering blackgaze/post-black metal, particularly with their 2005 EP Le secret.

== History ==
=== Formation and early years (2000–2006) ===
Alcest was formed as Neige's solo project in 2000. Soon after, the band became a three-piece black metal outfit, consisting of Neige on vocals, rhythm/acoustic guitar, and drums, bassist Argoth, and Aegnor on lead guitar.

In 2001, the band released the four-track demo Tristesse hivernale on Drakkar Productions. Aegnor wrote the main riff of the song "La Forêt de Cristal". Not long after the demo was released, the band reverted to a one-man entity. Neige took Alcest in a more personal direction. Having formed Alcest to play black metal, Neige moved away from minimalism with the follow-up to Tristesse Hivernale, Le secret. This EP, released in May 2005, introduced the concept behind the reformed Alcest.

=== Souvenirs d'un autre monde and Écailles de lune (2007–2011) ===
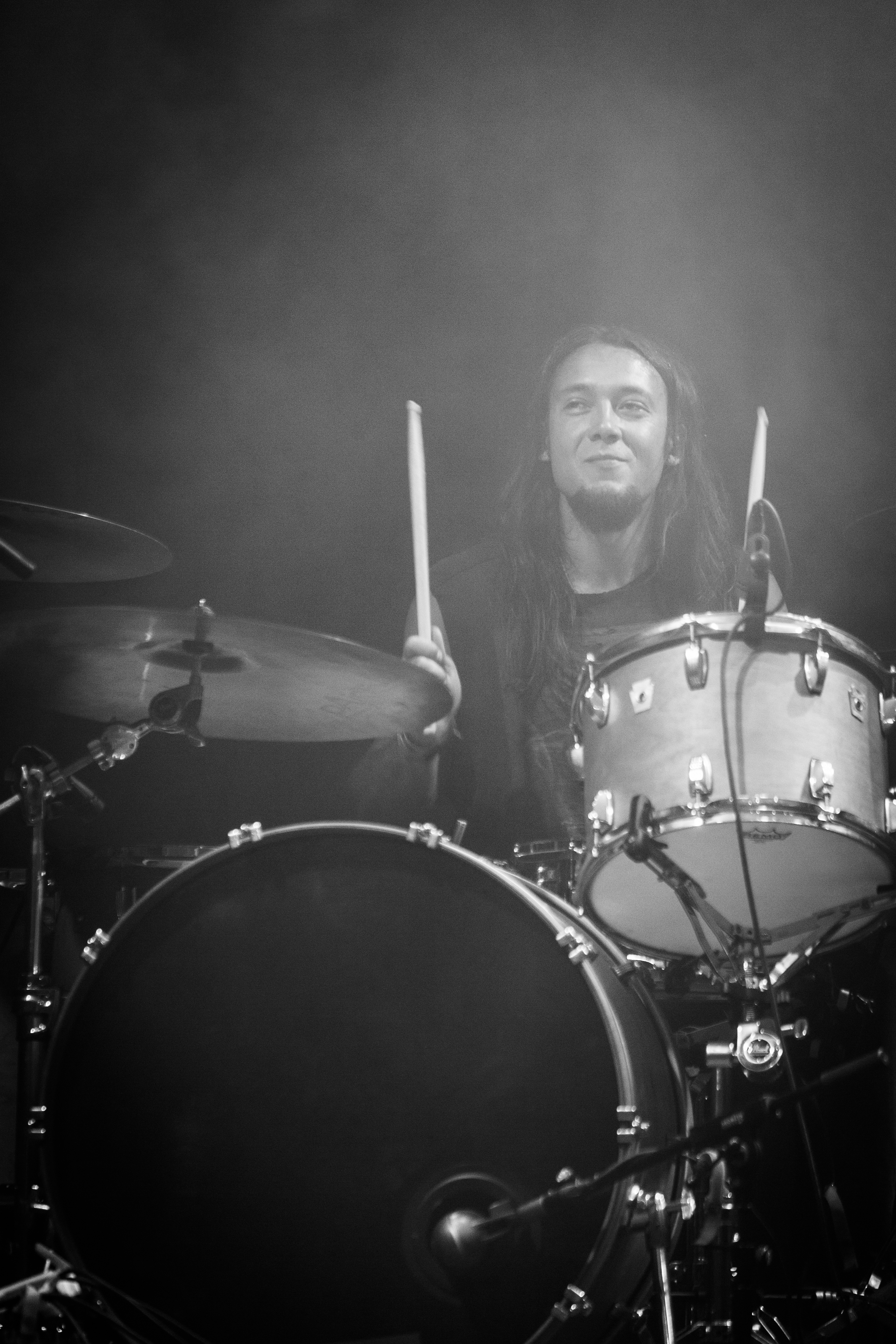
After being a one-man project for eight years, Alcest became a duo in 2009 when Winterhalter (pictured in 2016) joined as drummer.

After signing to Prophecy Productions in March 2007, Alcest's debut studio album, Souvenirs d'un autre monde, was released in August of that year, and drew comparisons with My Bloody Valentine and Jesu. According to Pitchfork's Brandon Stosuy, the album "isn't black metal at all", and compared it to "a lighter take on Jesu shoegazing".

In August 2007, Tristesse hivernale was released by Northern Silence Productions as a split with French black metal band Angmar. The band released a split EP with the French band Les Discrets on 30 November 2009.

Alcest's anticipated second studio album, Écailles de lune (Scales of the Moon), was released on 29 March 2010. It was received with generally positive reviews from critics. AllMusic's Ned Raggett wrote that the album "makes the most of its compelling fusion of black metal's theatricality and the after-echoes of shoegaze's propensity for utterly enveloping a listener, even if bandleader Neige approached that sound unconsciously at first."

=== Les Voyages de l'âme and Shelter (2012–2015) ===
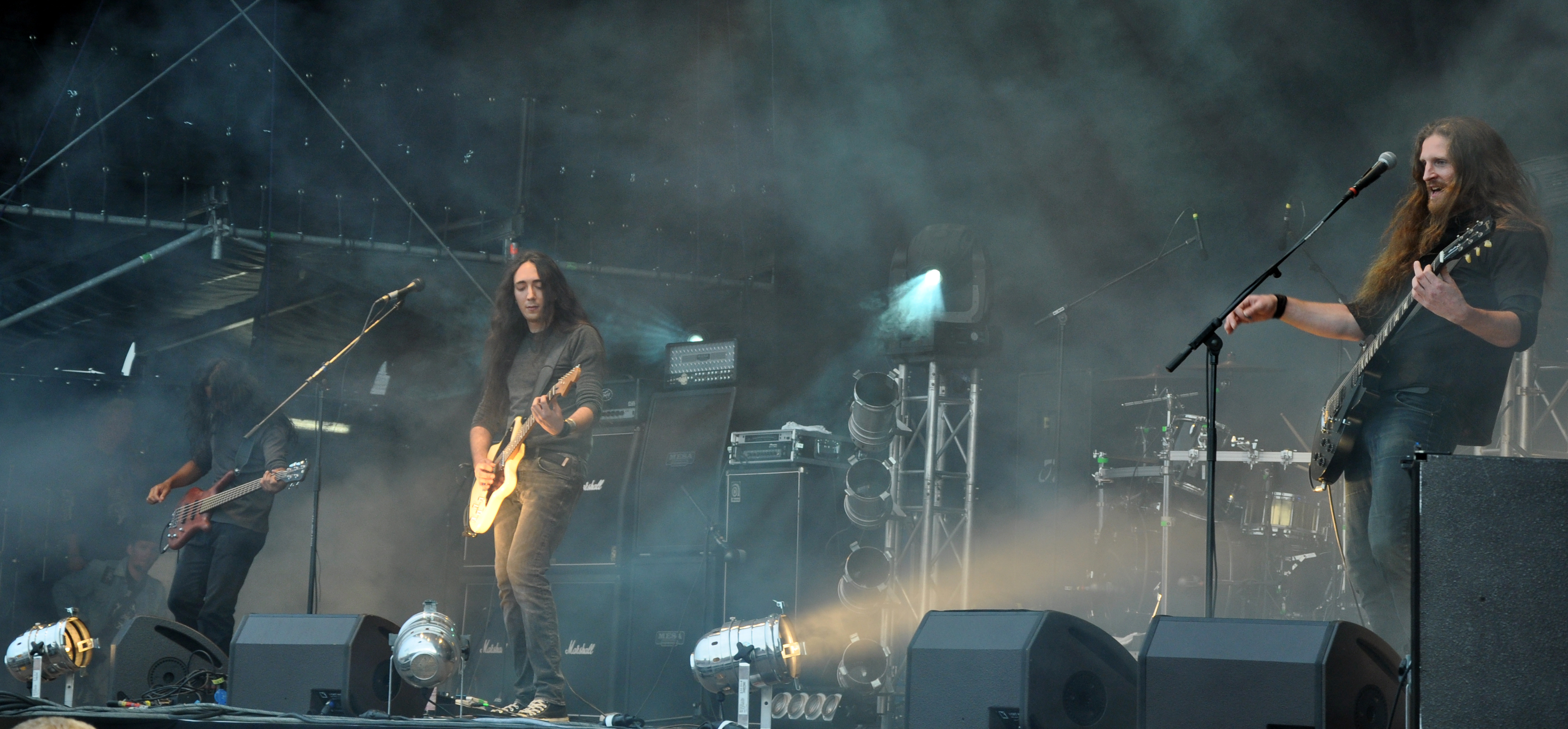
Alcest at Party.San Metal Open Air in Germany, August 2013

The band's third studio album, Les Voyages de l'âme, was released on 6 January 2012. The album received positive reviews from critics. The New York Times described it as "the best example yet of what [the band] can do."

Alcest's fourth effort, Shelter, was released on 17 January 2014 via Prophecy Productions. It featured producer Birgir Jón Birgisson, Amiina for the string sections, and a guest appearance by Neil Halstead. The album dropped all traces of metal and committed to shoegaze. Neige later said in an interview, "We are proud of it, but I think it was maybe a bit too influenced by other things. I really was obsessed with Slowdive at that time. Shelter still sounds very 'Alcest', but maybe not as much as the other records."

=== Kodama and Spiritual Instinct (2016–2021) ===
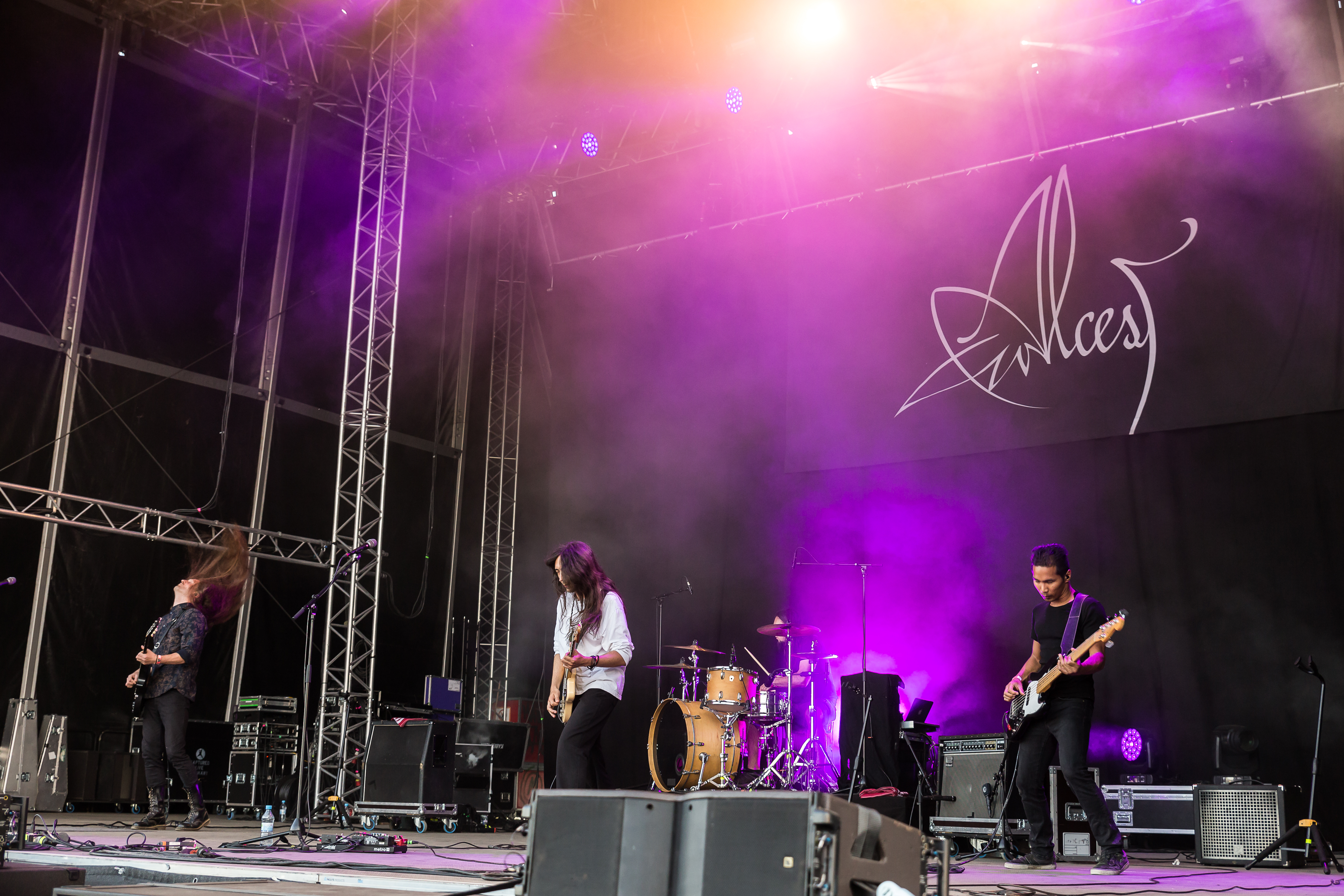
Alcest performing at Full Force in Germany, June 2019

On 15 January 2016, Neige revealed through the band's Facebook page that they started recording a fifth studio album. He commented the album would be "definitively darker". On 16 May, he stated that the album was being mastered. On 26 July, the title was revealed as Kodama, and the release date to be 30 September. Neige said the album was inspired by Japanese art and culture, as well as Hayao Miyazaki's film Princess Mononoke. The album returned to the band's traditional blackgaze sound.

On 22 January 2019, the band announced that they would start recording their next studio album the following day. They announced on 25 June 2019 that the album would be called Spiritual Instinct and would be released on 25 October of that year. Neige stated that its recording was "a long and challenging process." On 23 August 2019, the band released the first single from Spiritual Instinct, titled "Protection". Loudwire named the album one of the 50 best metal efforts of 2019.

=== Les Chants de l'aurore (2022–present) ===
On 6 August 2022, Neige confirmed that the band was in the pre-production process of their seventh studio album. Alcest announced Les Chants de l'aurore as their seventh studio album 23 February 2024, released on 21 June 2024, alongside the album's lead single, "L'Envol".

== Musical style and concept ==
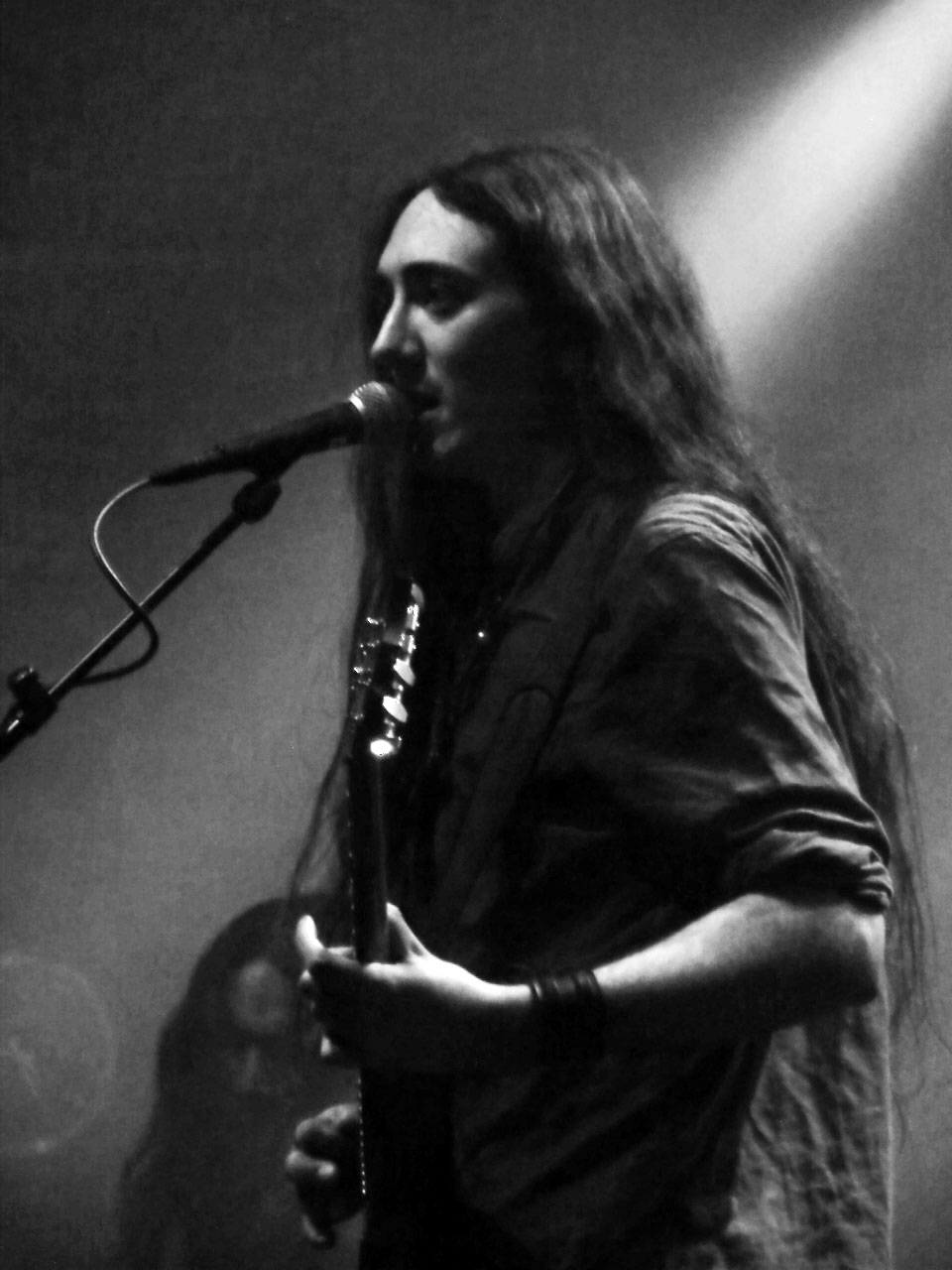
Neige's (pictured in 2011) childhood memories are a recurring theme in Alcest's music.

The band name Alcest originates from Alceste, a character from Molière's play The Misanthrope. Neige decided to use that name because of its "ethereal" sound and its representation of the project's concept; he removed the second "e" to differentiate the band from the play. As a child, Neige had experiences of being in contact with a "far off country", which he generically refers to as "Fairy Land". Alcest serves as the musical adaptation of the memories from this "otherworld". Neige intends for Alcest to be a journey for the listener to this world through his memories. This change in concept was first introduced in Le Secret. Souvenirs d'un autre monde serves as a literal summation of the concept behind the band.

Musically the band's sound has changed over time, beginning with their demo Tristesse hivernale that displays a very raw black metal sound, before evolving into post-black metal. The EP, Le Secret is considered the origin of blackgaze, and the band are widely credited with pioneering the genre. The band's sound is defined by a very atmospheric and uplifting tone, and is primarily described as post-metal and shoegaze. From Le Secret to Shelter the band drew on both black metal bands like Burzum and Ulver as well as shoegaze bands like Slowdive to create a huge wall of sound effect, using abrasive, screamed vocals, blastbeat sections, as well as fast tremolo-picked guitar passages. Their 2014 album Shelter was a significant departure from this sound, a purely shoegaze album entirely eliminating any trace of metal influence. However their following album Kodama was a partial return to their earlier blackgaze sound.

== Members ==
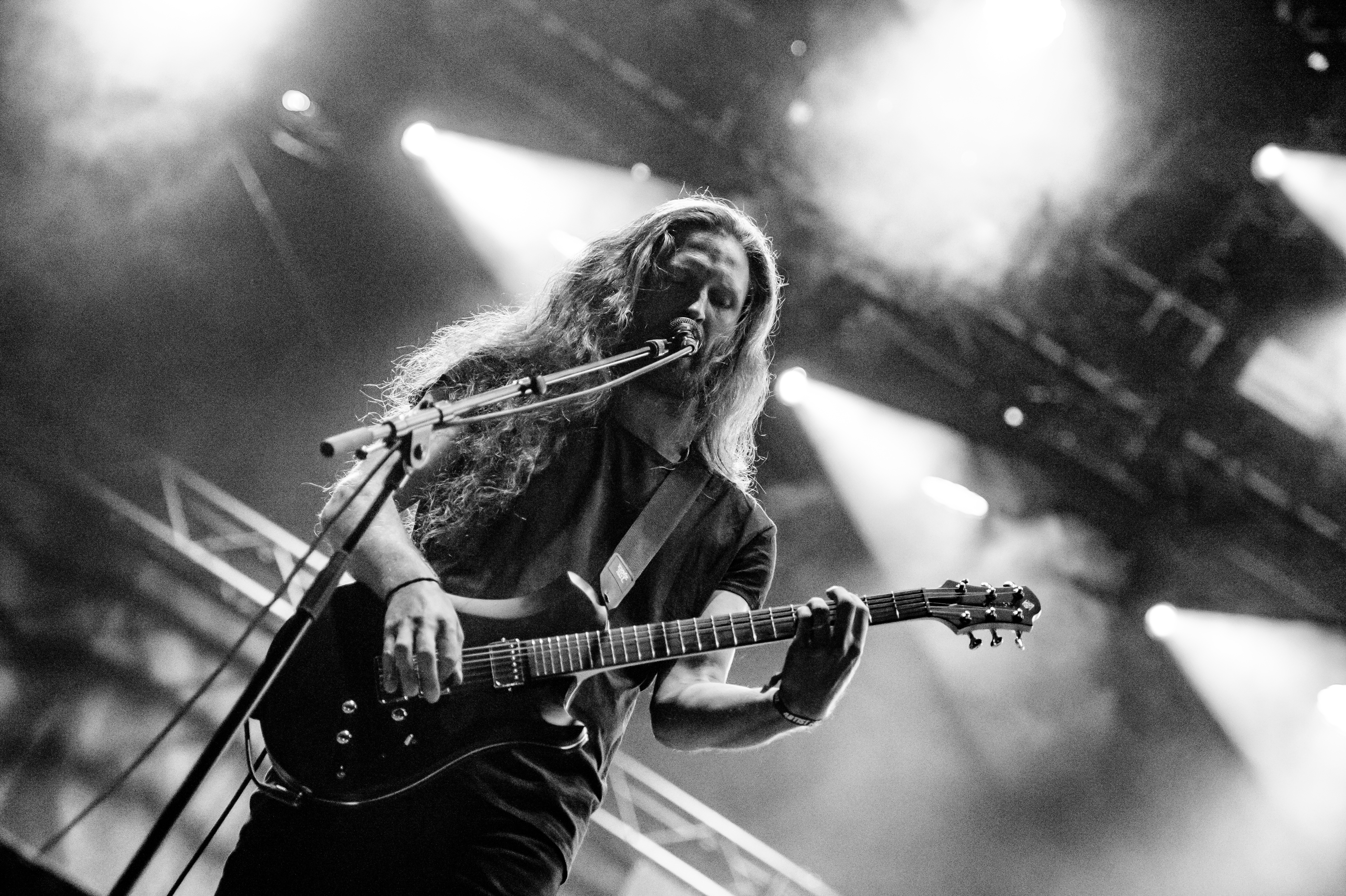
Guitarist Zero in 2017

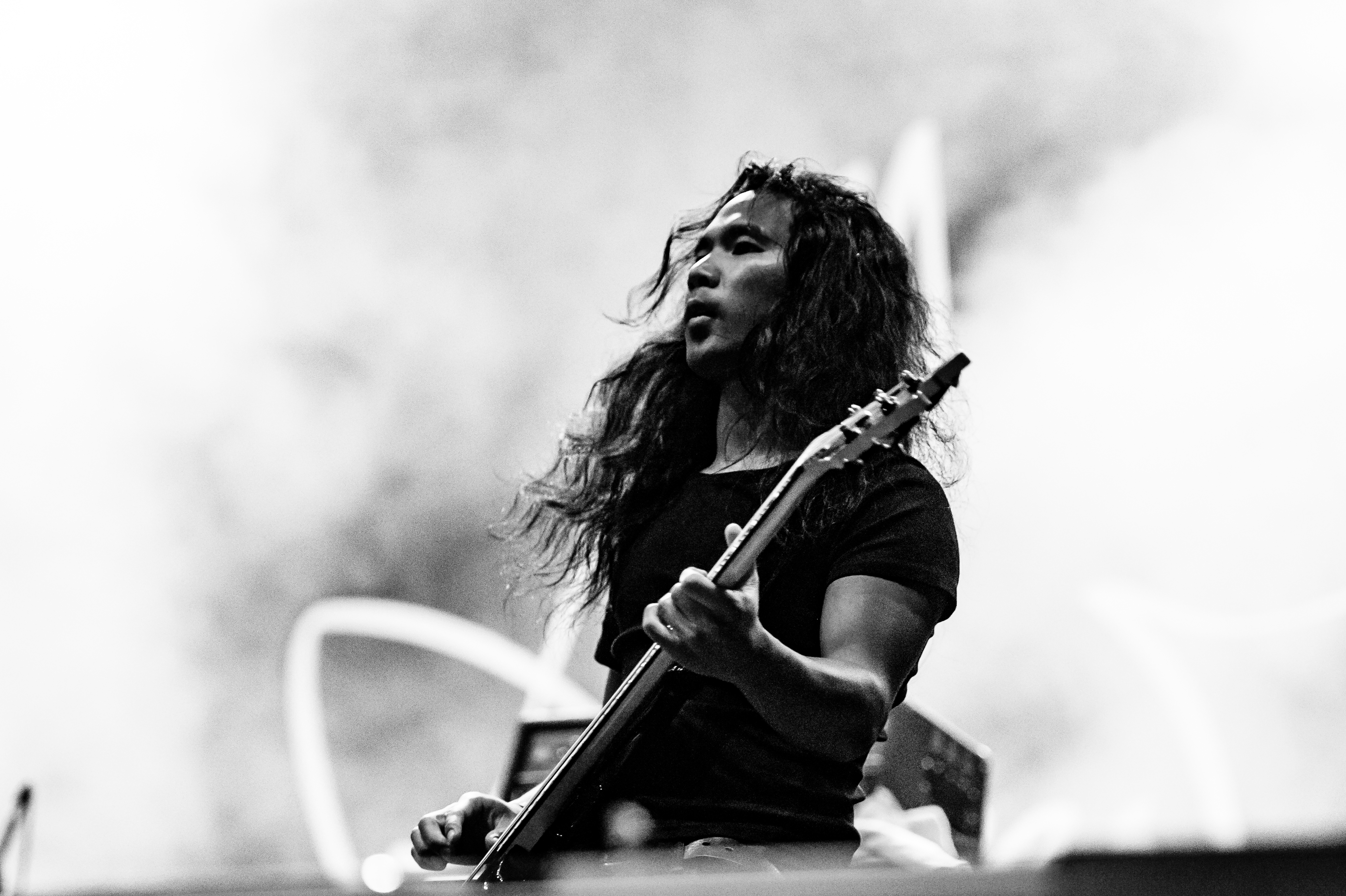
Bassist Indria Saray in 2017

Alcest has employed two live musicians since 2010.

Current

- Stéphane "Neige" Paut – lead vocals, guitars, keyboards (2000–present), drums (2000–2009), bass (2001–present)
- Jean "Winterhalter" Deflandre – drums, percussion (2009–present)

Current live musicians

- Pierre "Zero" Corson – guitar, backing vocals (2010–present)
- Indria Saray – bass (2010–present)

Former

- Ludovic "Aegnor" Faure – lead guitar (2000–2001)
- Argoth – bass (2000–2001)

Former live musicians

- Fursy Teyssier – bass (2010)
- Zoé – guitar (2013)

== Discography ==
=== Studio albums ===
List of studio albums, with selected information
Title	Details	Peak chart positions							
Title	Details	FR	AUT	BEL (FL)	BEL (WA)	FIN	GER	SWI	US Heat
Souvenirs d'un autre monde	Released: 8 August 2007; Label: Prophecy; Formats: CD, LP, cassette, digital download, streaming	—	—	—	—	—	—	—	—
Écailles de lune	Released: 26 March 2010; Label: Prophecy; Formats: CD, LP, cassette, digital download, streaming	—	—	—	—	—	—	—	—
Les Voyages de l'âme	Released: 6 January 2012; Label: Prophecy; Formats: CD, DVD, LP, cassette, digital download, streaming	—	—	—	—	—	—	—	—
Shelter	Released: 17 January 2014: Label: Prophecy; Formats: CD, DVD, LP, cassette, digital download, streaming, box set	—	—	—	—	17	28	—	—
Kodama	Released: 30 September 2016; Label: Prophecy; Formats: CD, DVD, LP, cassette, digital download, streaming, box set	—	—	109	186	—	15	62	8
Spiritual Instinct	Released: 25 October 2019; Label: Nuclear Blast; Formats: CD, LP, cassette, digital download, streaming, box set	106	63	92	—	34	12	30	6
Les Chants de l'aurore	Released: 21 June 2024; Label: Nuclear Blast; Formats: CD, LP, digital download, streaming	77	—	132	174	—	14	22	—
"—" denotes a recording that did not chart or was not released in that territory.

=== Extended plays ===
- Le secret (2005, re-recorded version in 2011)
- BBC Live Session (2012)
- Protection EP (2019)

=== Split albums ===
- Aux Funérailles du Monde.../Tristesse Hivernale with Angmar (2007)
- Alcest / Les Discrets with Les Discrets (2009)

=== Demo albums ===
- Tristesse hivernale (2001)

=== Singles ===
==== As lead artist ====
List of singles, showing year released and album name
Title	Year	Album
"Autre Temps"	2011	Les Voyages de l'âme
"Opale"	2013	Shelter
"Oiseaux de proie"	2016	Kodama
"Je suis d'ailleurs"	2016	Kodama
"Protection"	2019	Spiritual Instinct
"Sapphire"	2019	Spiritual Instinct
"L'Envol"	2024	Les Chants de l'aurore
"Flamme Jumelle"	2024	Les Chants de l'aurore

==== As featured artist ====
List of singles, showing year released and album name
Title	Year	Album
"Sing for the Damage We've Done" (Harakiri for the Sky featuring Alcest)	2020	Mӕre
"Hvítir Sandar" (Kælan Mikla featuring Alcest)	2021	Undir Köldum Norðurljósum
"The Run I. & II." (Pencey Sloe featuring Alcest and JK Flesh)	2022	Neglect
"Wings of Glass" (Gísli Gunnarsson featuring Alcest)	2024	non-album single
"Age of Aquarius" (Perturbator featuring Alcest)	2025	Age of Aquarius

=== Guest appearances ===
- Feature on the Kælan Mikla track Hvitir Sandar from the album Undir Köldum Norðurljósum (2021)

=== Music Videos ===
Year	Title
2011	"Autre Temps"
2012	"Les Voyages de l'âme"
2013	"Opale"
2019	"Sapphire"
2019	"Protection"
2024	"L'Envol"
2024	"Flamme Jumelle"
2025	"Amethyste"
