= Intentional camera movement =

Intentional movement of the camera to achieve a visual effect

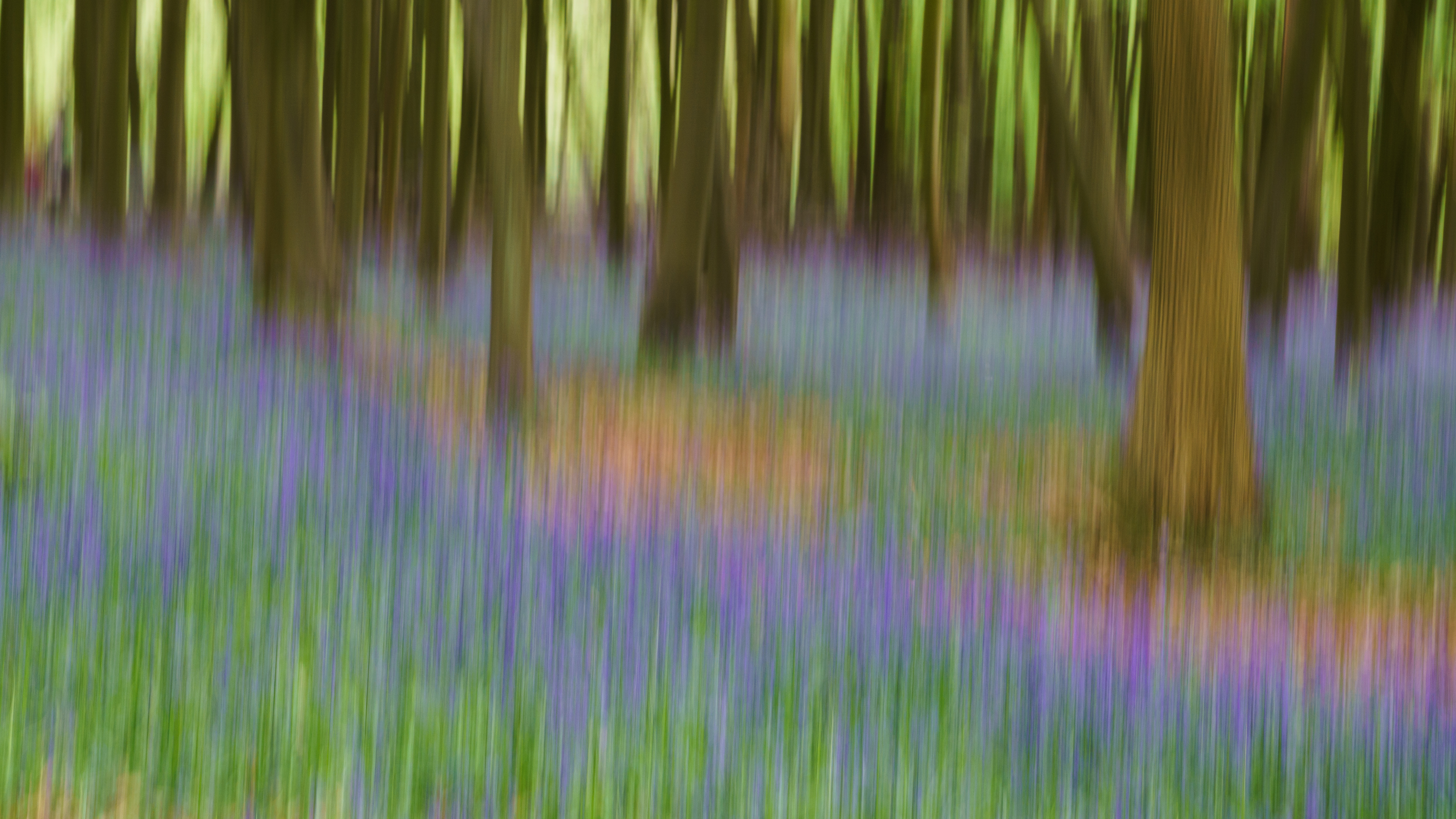
Vertical movement captures the impression of a bluebell wood

In intentional camera movement (ICM), a camera is moved during the exposure for a creative or artistic effect. This causes the image points to move across the recording medium, producing varied effects such as streaking, textures, and layers in the resulting image. The central idea in ICM photography is that motion serves as the primary compositional element. Strict technical or definitional arguments remain vague in this form of photography which has a long history and is connected with many other forms of photography, such as Impressionism and often blurs genres and styles.

== Technique ==
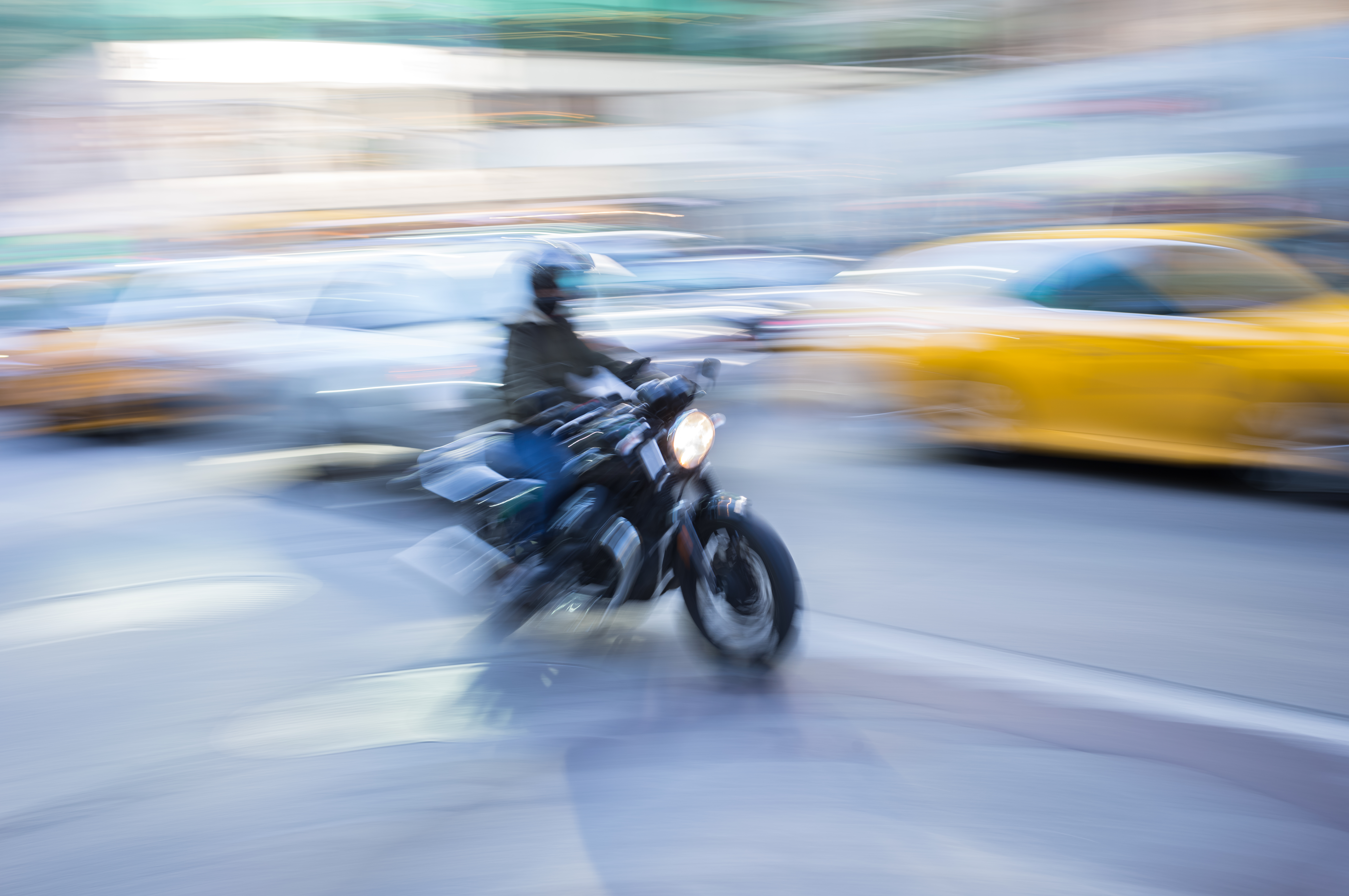
A motorcyclist in Midtown Manhattan, reminiscent of the works of Ernst Haas

The process often involves the selection of a narrow aperture and the use of filters and light to achieve a suitable shutter speed. Proponents experiment both with the duration of the exposure and the direction and amount of camera movement while the shutter is open. Examples of exposures often range from 1/20 to 1/2 second though experimenting with settings often creates unique results. A shutter speed of 1/8 of a second is an example of what might retain the shape of subjects, and strip away surface detail. The effect depends significantly on the direction that the camera is moved in relation to the subject as well as the speed of the movement.

If light levels are high, the use of neutral-density filters will reduce the light entering the lens, thus enabling the exposure to be extended with the drawback of limiting the quality of good lenses. A polarising filter can also be fitted to the lens. This has a dual effect of reducing reflections within the image and reducing the light by about two stops. Photographers set the camera's ISO setting to the lowest available on the camera (commonly 100), as this reduces the camera's sensitivity to light and so gives the slowest possible shutter speed.

The direction of movement of the lens has a dramatic effect on the results. Repetition is required, along with much experimentation, to establish where and how to move the camera to achieve the desired effect. The camera can be moved upwards, downwards, to the right or left or away from or towards the subject while being handheld as well as in an infinite number of more creative motions. The camera may be turned, angled, and rapidly moved back and forth.

Leading proponents of the technique include Ernst Haas, Alexey Titarenko, and (from as early as 1962) Kōtarō Tanaka. Giacomo Bucci was one of the first photographers who described in 1973 the concept of ICM before it was formally defined and to exhibit his photographs in London in 1974.

== Relation to motion blur ==
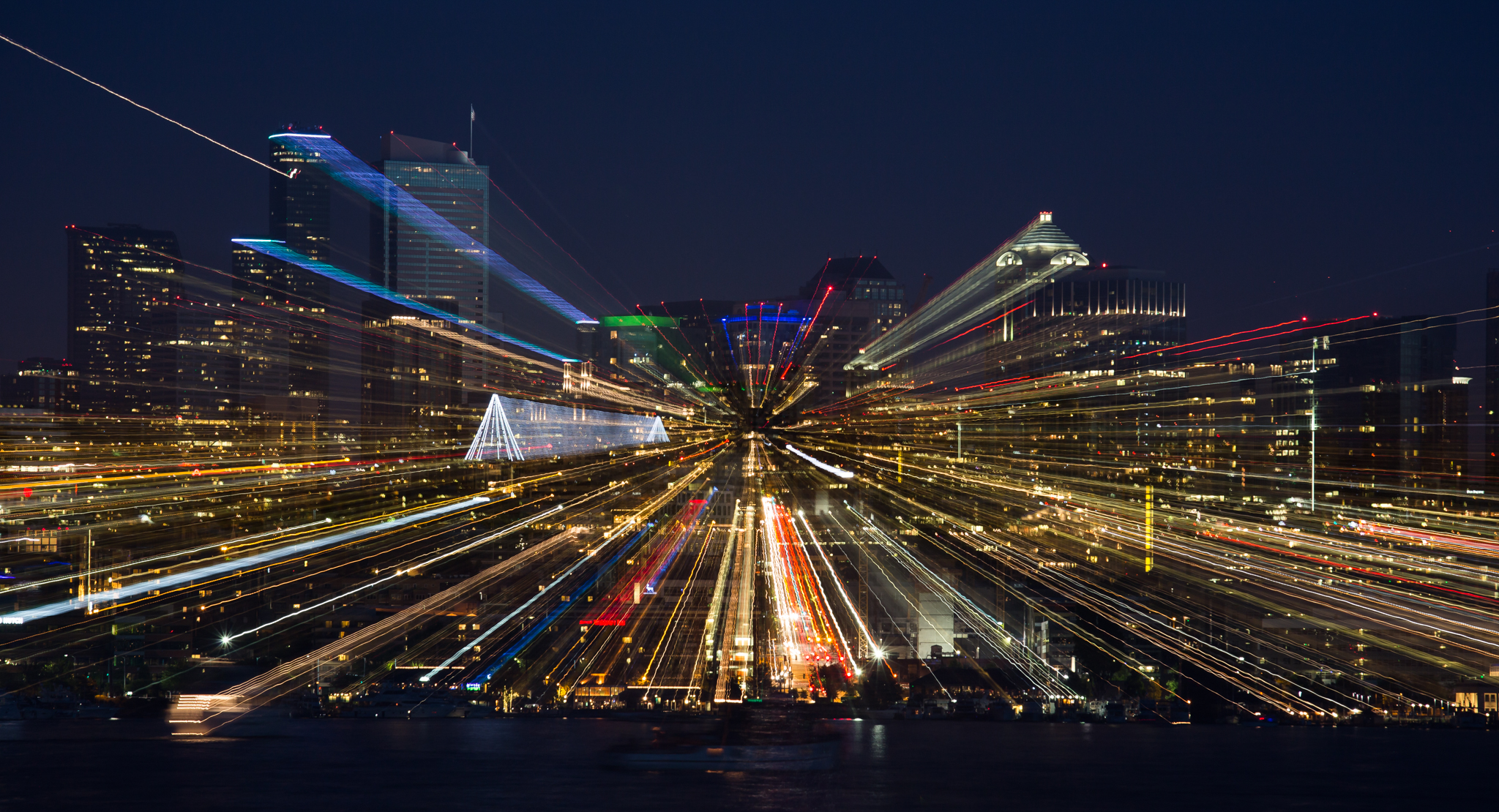
Zoom burst, a photograph taken with a zoom lens, whose focal length was varied during the course of the exposure

In a sense, ICM is the same effect as (intentional) single-exposition motion blur: in the former the camera moves during exposure, in the latter the target moves, but they have in common that there is relative motion between camera and target, often resulting in streaking in the image. Yet, the definitions are better left vague as freedom and creativity is especially relevant to this process. Many people use unedited in camera photos, or multiple exposure, or post processing and many others don't. There is a lot of freedom in this type of photography, which is why it attracts so many professional photographers who are typically more bound by strict rules.

A special case, called panning, occurs when the camera is moved during exposure while keeping it pointed at a moving target, to hold its projection on the recording medium steady. The stationary environment (usually mainly background, but possibly also some foreground) then is subjected to ICM and appears streaked in the final image.

Another special case is that of forward (or backwards) camera movement, typically with the camera focused on the distance. The streaks in the resulting image converge on the central point, giving a suggestion as if it is at the end of a long tunnel. A similar effect can be achieved by changing the focal length of a zoom lens during the exposure.

== See also ==
- Panning
- Zoom burst
