= Eberhard effect =

Effect in photographic science

In photographic science, the Eberhard effect, named after Gustav Eberhard, is a special case of two Mackie lines when narrow areas of high and low densities (usually lines approaching within 1 mm. thickness) cause the two Mackie lines to meet which results in an increased density of this small area. Eberhard published his findings in 1912 or in 1926, 1931. The Eberhard effect belongs to the family of photographic edge effects.

The effect is a neighbor effect when a dark area is situated next to a light area. Thus the developer oxidation products (mainly bromide ions) which are abundant in dark areas slow down the developing process, causing light lines in the area next to the dark area. Similar, the light area (in which there is less development) will cause increased development in the dark areas because there is an abundance of fresh developer. Therefore, the border between light and dark areas will show an increase of contrast at the border by lighter and darker lines. This is visually seen as a sharpening of the image.

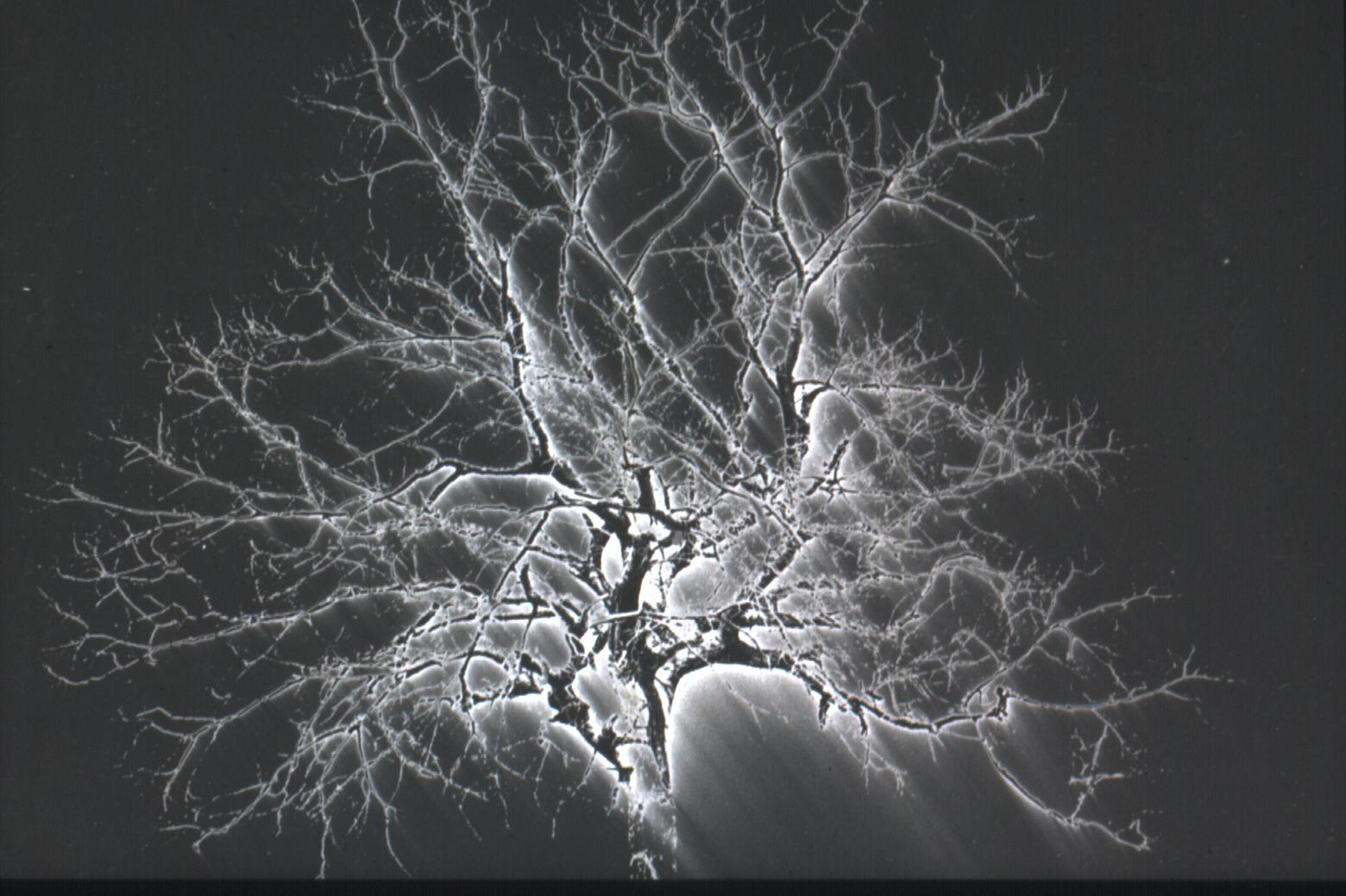
Negative print wherein the Eberhard Effect became very pronounced due to development without movement

The effect can be seen quite easily in extreme cases such as in the image of a tree against a grey background of the sky. The positive print was made and developed without movement. The fresh developer at dark places (such as the tree trunk and branches) caused dark streaks in the lighter areas when the developing tray was not moved and the print was taken out in one movement and immediately fixed. From the print a negative was made which showed a more pleasing result
