= Alexey Titarenko =

Russian-born American photographer and artist

Alexey Titarenko Алексей Титаренко
- Born: Alexey Viktorovich Titarenko; November 25, 1962 (age 63); Saint Petersburg, Russia
- Known for: Photography

Alexey (Aleksey, Alexis, Alexei) Viktorovich Titarenko (born November 25, 1962; Russian: Алексей Викторович Титаренко) is a Soviet Union-born American photographer and artist. He lives and works in New York City.

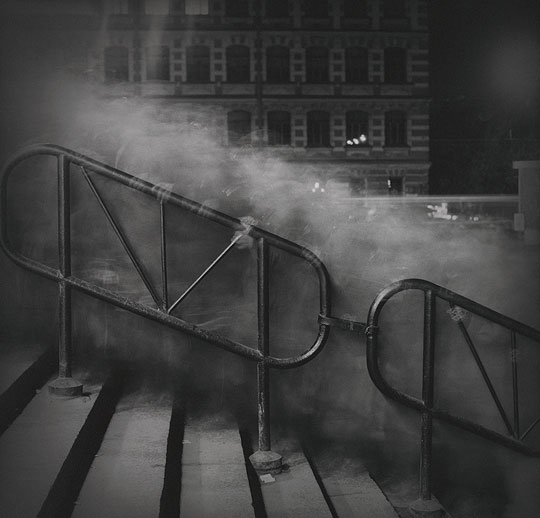
Titarenko's Saint Petersburg, 1992, from City of Shadows series.

== Biography ==
Titarenko was born in Leningrad, USSR, now Saint Petersburg, Russia. His mother survived the Siege of Leningrad and later became a mathematician. His father was born at the Gulag camp Karlag in Kazakhstan, near Karaganda where his parents were deported to by bolsheviks from Russia during collectivization. He later became a coal mining engineer in his home town Karaganda, Kazakhstan. They were both students of Leningrad University. At age 15, Alexey Titarenko became the youngest member of the independent photo club Zerkalo (Mirror). He went on to graduate with honors from the Department of Cinematic and Photographic Art at Leningrad's Institute of Culture.

Influenced by the Russian avant-garde works of Kazimir Malevich, Alexander Rodchenko and the Dada art movement (from the early 20th century), his series of collages and photomontages, created by superposing several negatives, Nomenklatura of Signs (first exhibited in 1988, in Leningrad, and later same year, in Drouart gallery, Paris, France) is a commentary on the Communist regime as an oppressive system that converts citizens into mere signs. In 1989, Nomenklatura of Signs was included in Photostroika, a major show of new Soviet photography that toured the US.

During and after the collapse of the Soviet Union in 1991–1992, he produced several series of photographs about the human condition of ordinary people living on its territory and the suffering they endured then and throughout the twentieth century. To illustrate links between the present and the past, he created metaphors by introducing long exposure, blur, and intentional camera movement into street photography. Sources have noted that his most important innovation is the way he uses long exposure. John Bailey, in his essay about Garry Winogrand and Titarenko, mentioned that one of the obstacles that he surmounted successfully was being too visible himself and, as a consequence, people's possible reaction to his presence altering the authenticity of the image.

Titarenko's best-known series from this period is City of Shadows (which is also a title of his autobiographical novel), whose urban landscapes reiterate the Odesa Steps (also known as the Primorsky or Potemkin Stairs) scene from Sergei Eisenstein's film The Battleship Potemkin. Inspired by the music of Dmitri Shostakovich and the novels of Fyodor Dostoevsky, Titarenko also translated Dostoevsky's vision of the Russian soul into sometimes poetic, sometimes dramatic pictures of his native city, Saint Petersburg. Intitled "Les Quatres Mouvements de Saint Petersbourg" by French art historian, writer and curator Gabriel Bauret, these photographs were exhibited, as Titarenko's solo show curated by Gabriel Bauret, at the Rencontres d'Arles 2002 in Reattu Museum (Arles, France).

Along with Alexander Sokurov's 2002 film Russian Ark, the City of Shadows exhibition (which now included photographs from the mid and late 1990s inspired by Dostoevsky's novels) was a part of the program celebrating the 300th anniversary of St. Petersburg at the 2003 Clifford Symposium, in Middlebury, VT: What Became of Peter's Dream? Petersburg in History and Arts The Russian Ark and the City of Shadows have one similarity: both are based on the experimental innovation: Alexander Sokurov using a single, very long – 96 minutes sequence shot and Titarenko's several minutes long exposure for some of his photographs.

In his photographs from Venice, mostly taken between 2001 and 2008, Titarenko uses "... a highly stylized technic that he put deftly in a service of strongly determined vision." Moreover, "Venice also offers him a reminiscence of Saint Petersburg, similar to a recollection found in the work of Marcel Proust, who, in Albertine disparue (The Fugitive), recounts during his Venetian sojourn that he cannot resist comparisons to Combray." Venice, Italy creates a counterbalance, a point of comparison with Venice of the North where he was born - Saint Petersburg. In Titarenko's photographs, like in Proust's writings, " ... what matters is less the scrupulous description of reality than a particular vision it renders."

Titarenko creates his prints in a darkroom. Critics have called him a master of the darkroom technique. Selective bleaching and toning (often done by brush) add depth to his palette of grays. Like Man Ray and Maurice Tabard, Titarenko uses so-called pseudo-solarization, but unlike his predecessors, he exposes the print to light during the developing process mostly at the edges and in a subtle way that lowers the contrast and creates a very particular kind of gray silver 'veil'. In order to emphasize the dramatic aspects of the City of Shadows series, he sometimes combines the Sabattier effect with adjacency effect created during development, called the Mackie line.

Through interviews, lectures, books, curated exhibitions and two documentaries by French-German TV channel Arte (2004, 2005), Titarenko describes a particular vision of an artist and of Art, close to that of Marcel Proust, linked to literature, poetry and classical music (especially that of Dmitri Shostakovich), placing himself far apart from contemporary tendencies developing particularly in Moscow.

A 2011 exhibition of 15 gelatin silver prints from his Havana, Cuba series (2003-2006) in the J. Paul Getty Museum group show, A Revolutionary Project: Cuba from Walker Evans to Now, linked Titarenko's approach to street photography in contemporary Havana to that of Walker Evans in 1933, by the subjects he photographed and aspects of his printing.

Titarenko became a naturalized United States citizen in 2011; and lives and works in New York City as an artist, photographer, and printer.

His work in New York continues today. "Using long exposure and darkroom technique, his goal is still to create a print that expresses his experience when creating the image ... paint with symbols, lifting them to the surface from the murk of reality. It should not be surprising, then, that Titarenko's vision of New York resonates with the work of Alvin Langdon Coburn and Alfred Stieglitz - men who strived to embody the dynamism of the city and its people in photographs at the turn of the twentieth century. As Titarenko's relationship with New York grows and changes, so too will the photographs he creates. It is the nature of his working methods."

== Publications ==
=== Publications by Titarenko ===
- The Photographs from the Cycle Black and White Magic of St. Petersburg. Soros Center for Contemporary Art / Open Society Institute, St Petersburg, 1997. With an essay in Russian and English by Georgy Golenky, Senior Research Curator at the Russian State Museum, St.Peterburg. (Note: The essay can be viewed as a PDF here within Titarenko's site.)
- Alexei Titarenko. Toulouse, France: Galerie Municipale de Château d'Eau, 2000. ISBN 2-913241-20-4.
- City of Shadows. Saint Petersburg, Russia: Art-Tema, 2001. ISBN 5-94258-005-7.
- Alexey Titarenko, Photographs. Washington D.C.: Nailya Alexander, 2003. ISBN 0-9743991-0-8.
- The City is a Novel. Bologna, Italy: Damiani, 2015. ISBN 978-88-6208-414-7.
- Nomenklatura of Signs. Bologna, Italy: Damiani, 2020. ISBN 978-88-6208-699-8.

=== Publication with contributions by Titarenko ===
- Revolutionary Passage. From Soviet to Post-Soviet Russia, 1985-2000 by Marc Garcelon, Temple University Press, Philadelphia, 2005. ISBN 1-59213-362-2.
- The World Atlas of Street Photography. New Haven and London: Yale University Press, 2014. ISBN 978-0-300-20716-3. Edited by Jackie Higgins. With a foreword by Max Kozloff.
- The Short Story of Photography by Ian Haydn Smith, London: Laurence King Publishing, 2018. ISBN 978-1-78627-201-0.

== Exhibitions ==
- Experiences photographiques russes, Month of Photography in Paris 1992, Grand Ecran, Paris, France. Titarenko contributed photographs from his Nomenklatura of signs series to this exhibition.
- Alexey Titarenko, City of Shadows, July–August 2001, Apex Fine Art, Absolut L.A. International Biennal, Los Angeles, USA.
- Alexey Titarenko, les quatre mouvements de Saint-Petersbourg, July–September 2002, Musée Réattu, Rencontres d'Arles festival, Arles, France.
- Alexey Titarenko: Saint Petersburg in Four Movements, Nailya Alexander Gallery, New York, February–April 2010.
- A Revolutionary Project: Cuba from Walker Evans to Now, May–October 2011 Getty Museum, Los Angeles, CA. Titarenko contributed photographs from Cuba to this group exhibition on the island.
- Italia Inside Out. I Grandi Fotografi E L'Italia, November 2015 - February 2016, Palazzo della Ragione, Milan, Italy. Titarenko contributed photographs from Venice to this group exhibition about Italy.
- The City is a Novel & City of Shadows, September 2020 - December 2020, Multimedia Art Museum, Moscow
- Град на сенките & City of Shadows June 2022 - August 2022, National Art Gallery, Bulgaria

== Collections ==
Titarenko's work is held in the following permanent collections:

- Philadelphia Museum of Art, PA
- Museum of Fine Arts, Boston, MA
- The Museum of Fine Arts, Houston, TX
- Chrysler Museum of Art, Norfolk, VA
- Davis Museum at Wellesley College, Wellesley, MA
- J. Paul Getty Museum, Los Angeles, CA
- Zimmerli Art Museum at Rutgers University, New Brunswick, NJ
- Yale University Art Gallery, New Haven, CT
- Multimedia Art Museum, Moscow, Russia
- Berkeley Art Museum and Pacific Film Archive, CA
- Museum of the City of New York, NY
- Musée de l'Élysée, Lausanne, Switzerland
- Denver Art Museum, CO
- Baltimore Museum of Art, MD

And many others

== Documentary TV and film about Titarenko ==
- Le Journal de la Culture series on Arte aired a 7-minute episode on Titarenko in 2004.
- Alexey Titarenko: Art et la Maniere (2005). 30 minutes. Directed by Rebecca Houzel. Produced by Image & Co. for Arte.
