= 9XI =

9XI may refer to:

- KUOM, a college radio station operated by the University of Minnesota Twin Cities
- Minolta 9xi, a 35mm SLR camera designed and manufactured by Minolta
