= Zoom burst =

Photographic technique

Zoom burst is a photographic technique, attainable with zoom lenses with a manual zoom ring.

Using the technique involves zooming while the shutter is open with a relatively slow shutter speed, generally below 1/60 of a second. For this reason low light or small apertures are required. It is also possible to achieve a similar effect with either computer software like Adobe Photoshop (after the photo has been shot) or a photographic filter. In these cases the shutter speed can be as fast as necessary.

Photographs taken with this technique are characterized by blurred streaks emanating from the center of the photograph. The effect is nearly identical to a motion blur image in which the camera is traveling towards the subject. For this reason the zoom burst is typically used to create an impression of motion towards the subject.

== Examples ==
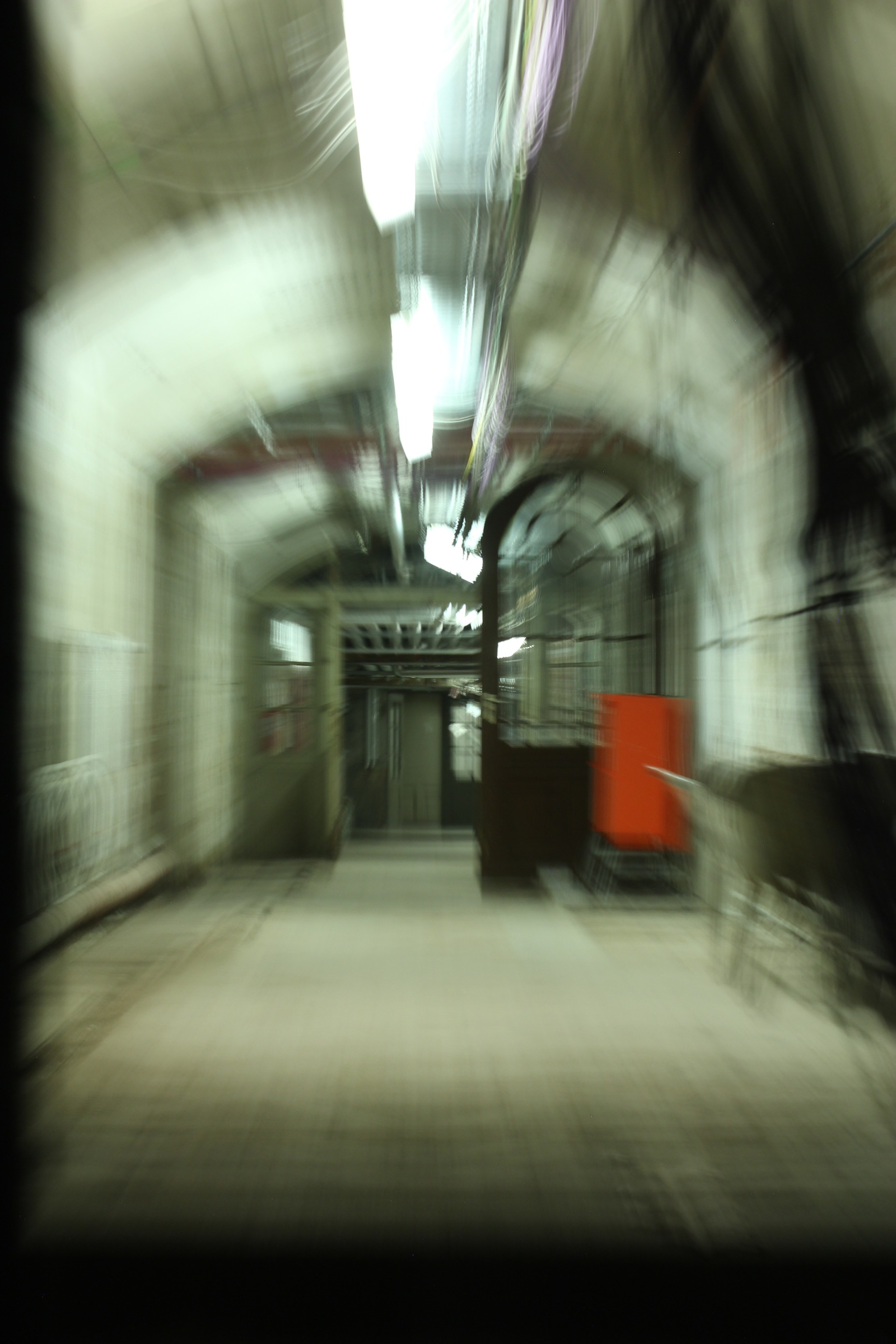
Long basement corridor, Exposure time of 1.3 sec on a 34 mm 18-55 lens

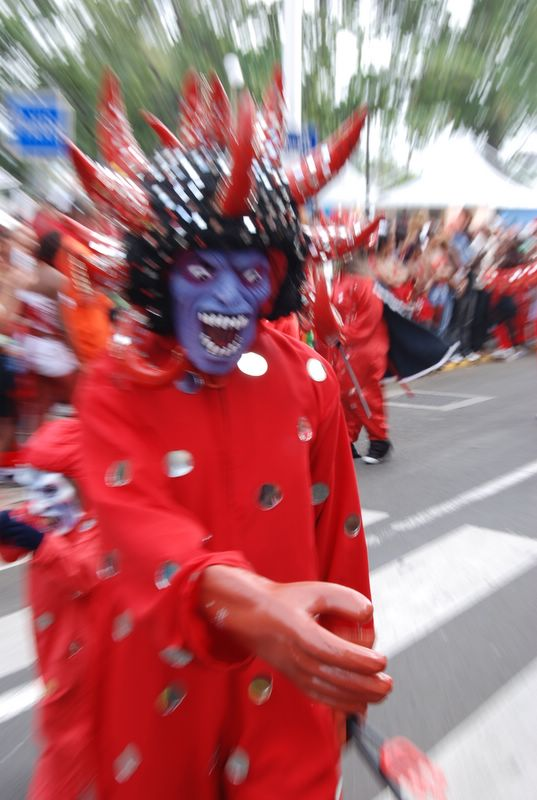
Costumed person during Martinique carnival, Exposure time: 1/20 sec

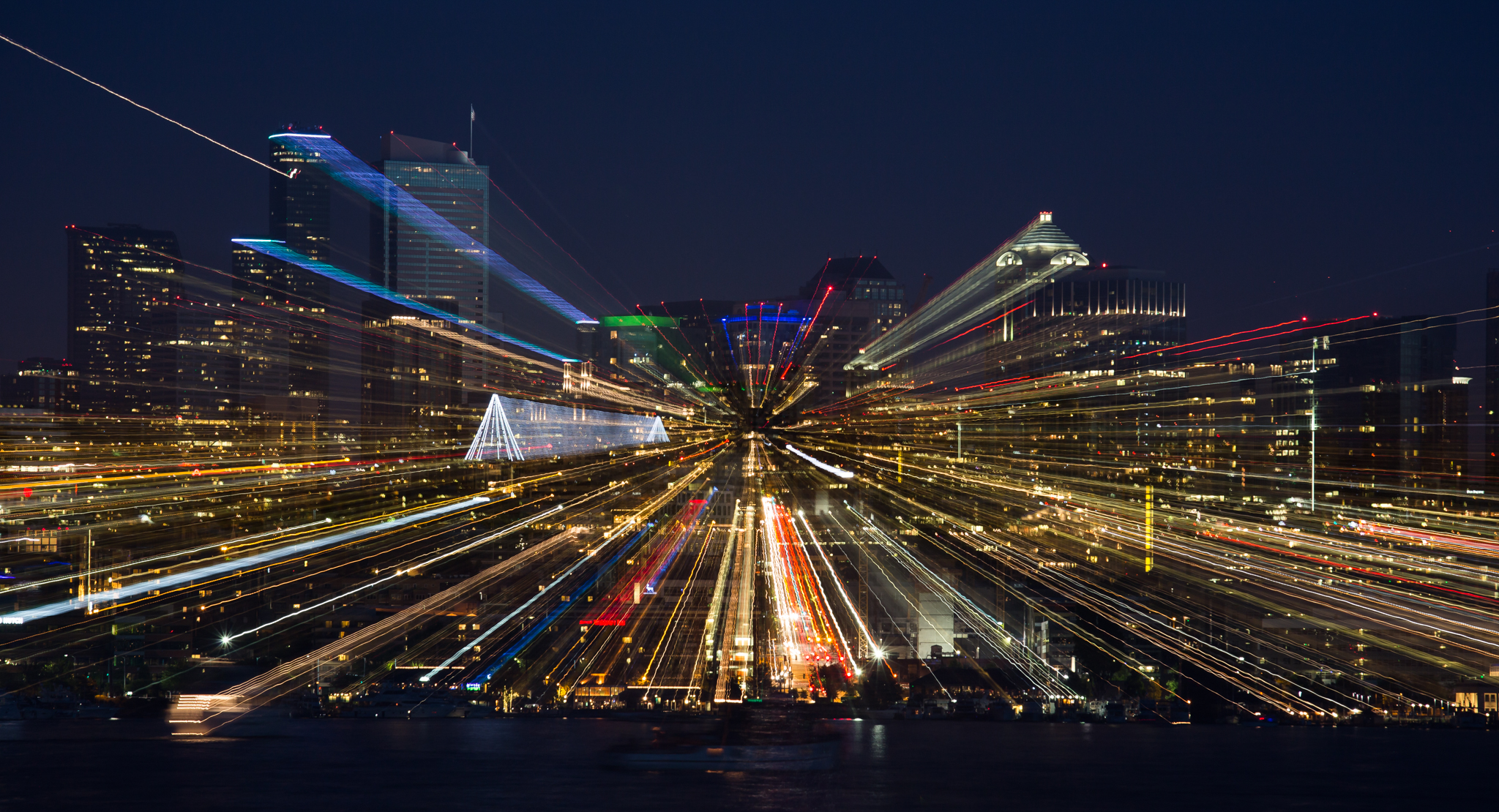
Nightly skyscraper, Exposure time: 6 sec

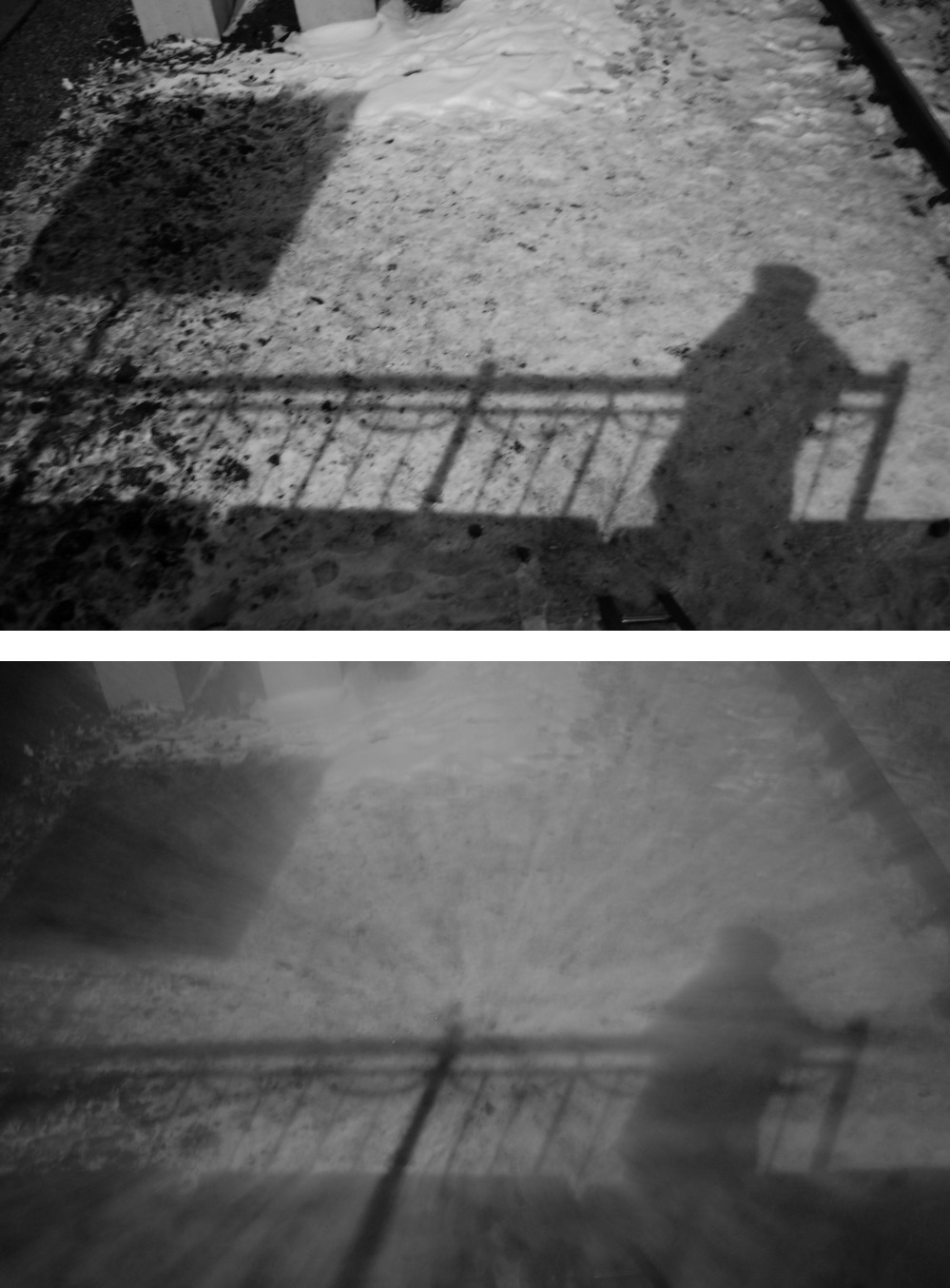
The Zoom Burst effect leads to a decrease in image contrast if the exposure is not compensated. Exposure time: 3 sec

== See also ==
- Intentional camera movement

== Reading list ==
- Bryan Peterson, Understanding Exposure, 1990, ISBN 978-0-8174-3711-4
- Bryan Peterson, Understanding Exposure, 2004, ISBN 978-0-8174-6300-7
