= Nailya Alexander Gallery =

Art gallery in New York City

- Established: 2004
- Location: 41 E 57th Street, Suite 704, New York, New York
- Director: Nailya Alexander
- Website: nailyaalexandergallery.com

The Nailya Alexander Gallery is an American art gallery that was founded in New York City in 2004. A member of the Association of International Photography Art Dealers, the gallery is known for its collection of rare and vintage gelatin-silver prints by the pioneers of the Russian avant-garde, as well as for its representation of contemporary American and European photographers.

The gallery has served as a venue for solo shows for contemporary artists Irina Nakhova, Pentti Sammallahti, George Tice, and Alexey Titarenko. Group photography exhibitions have included the "AIPAD Photography Show" (2014), "Classic Photographs Los Angeles" (2016), "Constructing The Frame: Composition Among The Early Soviet Avant-Garde", (2019) "Masters Of Early 20th Century Soviet Photography" (2019), "Russian Photography After the Revolution" (2017), "Soviet Photomontage 1920s-1930s" (2017), and "TASS Windows: World War II and the Art of Agitation" (2019).

Since 2010, the gallery has been located in New York's historic Fuller Building, where its first exhibition was of the works of Titarenko, titled "St. Petersburg in Four Movements". In 2019 the gallery commemorated its fifteenth anniversary with the show Color of Light: Fifteen Years of Nailya Alexander Gallery.
