= Gustav Eberhard =

German astrophysicist

Gustav E. Eberhard (10 August 1867 – 3 January 1940) German astrophysicist.

Eberhard published numerous investigations on spectroscopy and on photographic photogrametry.

The photographic Eberhard effect (belonging to the edge effects family) is named after him and was published in 1926.
