= Mackie line =

In photographic science, a Mackie line is an adjacency or border effect created during development, at the border between areas of high and low densities.

During developing, developer remains relatively fresh in an area of low density as less developing takes place, and consequently, developer oxidation product concentration remains relatively low. At the border between high and low density areas the relatively fresh developer diffuses laterally into the high density area and causes there a continuation of development. The result is an increased border density of the high density area.

The Mackie line effect belongs to the family of edge effects. Edge effects include: Gelatin-, Ross-, Fringe-, Eberhard- and Kostinsky effects.
