= Kōtarō Tanaka (photographer) =

Japanese photographer

Kōtarō Tanaka (田中 幸太郎, Tanaka Kōtarō; 1901–1995) was a Japanese amateur photographer particularly noted for his photography of Osaka and his use of color.

Tanaka was born in Ise, Mie (Japan) in 1901.

From 1932 onwards he participated in a variety of amateur photography groups. From 1948 he worked in the Osaka office of Asahi Shinbun's publishing company.

From 1955, Tanaka worked to photograph Kawachi in Osaka, in a series titled Kawachi Fūdoki (河内風土記). In 1962 he started photographing firework displays in color (then still unusual for such purposes), with his camera attached to his moving body.

Starting in the seventies, Tanaka won a series of awards for his long service to amateur photography in the Kansai area. He died on 7 November 1995.

== Collections of works by Tanaka ==
- Yume sen'ya (夢千夜). Osaka: Village Press, 1990. ISBN 4-938598-09-4
- Shamo to renkon hatake: Nihon no genfūkei Kawachi (シャモとレンコン畑：日本の原風景河内). Kyoto: Kōrinsha, 1993.
- Kōseki mange (光跡万華). Tokyo: Tanaka Kōtarō Sakuhinshū Iinkai, 1996.
- Shikisai kōkyōgaku 色彩交響楽). Bee Books 239. Tokyo: Mitsumura, 1996. ISBN 4-89615-239-5.
