= Shutter speed =

Length of time when the film or digital sensor inside a camera is exposed to light

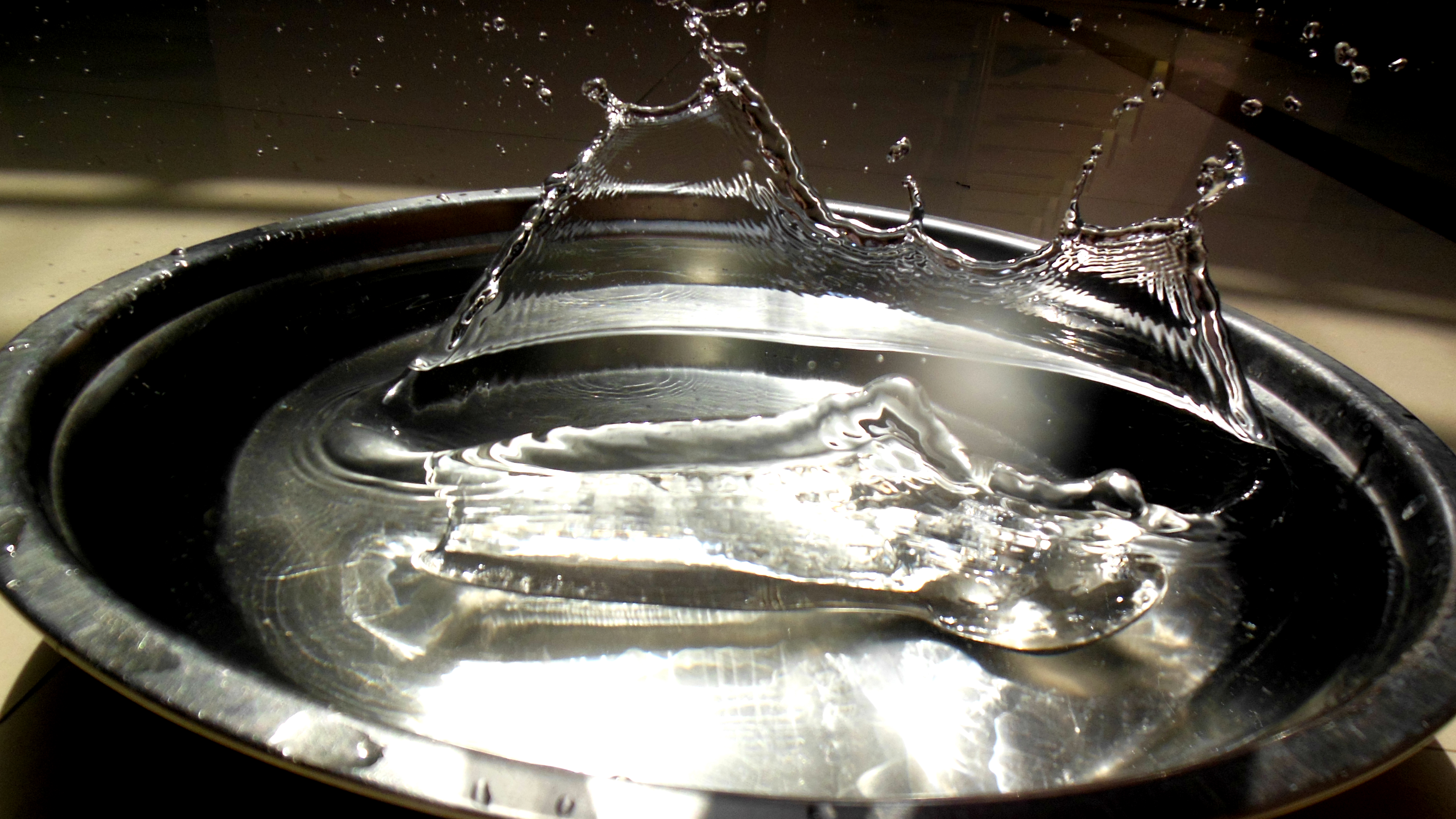
A spoon falling in water, taken at 1/2000 s

Shutter speed can have a dramatic impact on the appearance and quality of photographs, especially when moving objects are involved. At slow shutter speeds, even slight camera movement, such as the vibration of the shutter itself or the movement caused by pressing the shutter-release button, can blur the whole image, making stationary objects appear to have moved.

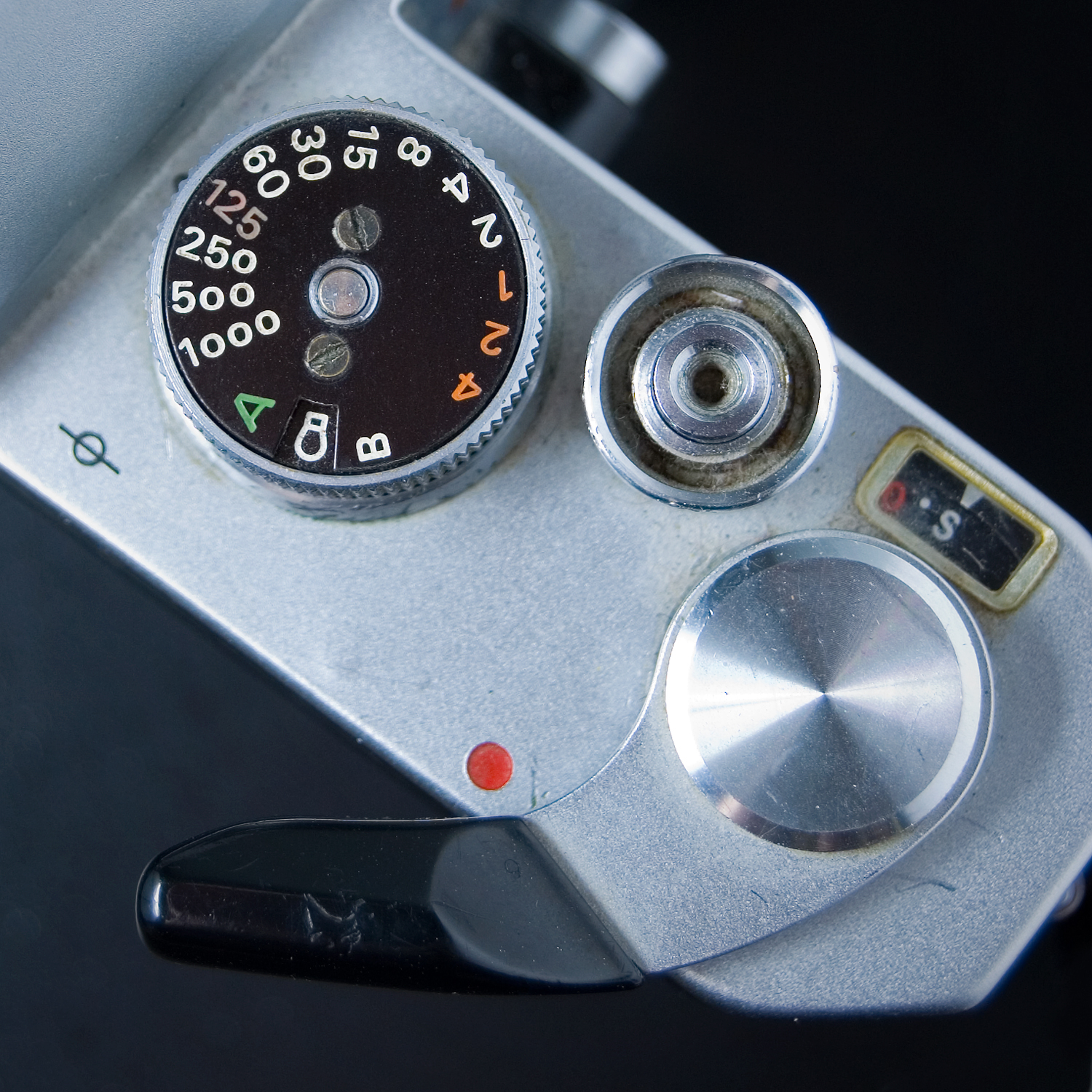
The shutter speed dial of a Nikkormat EL

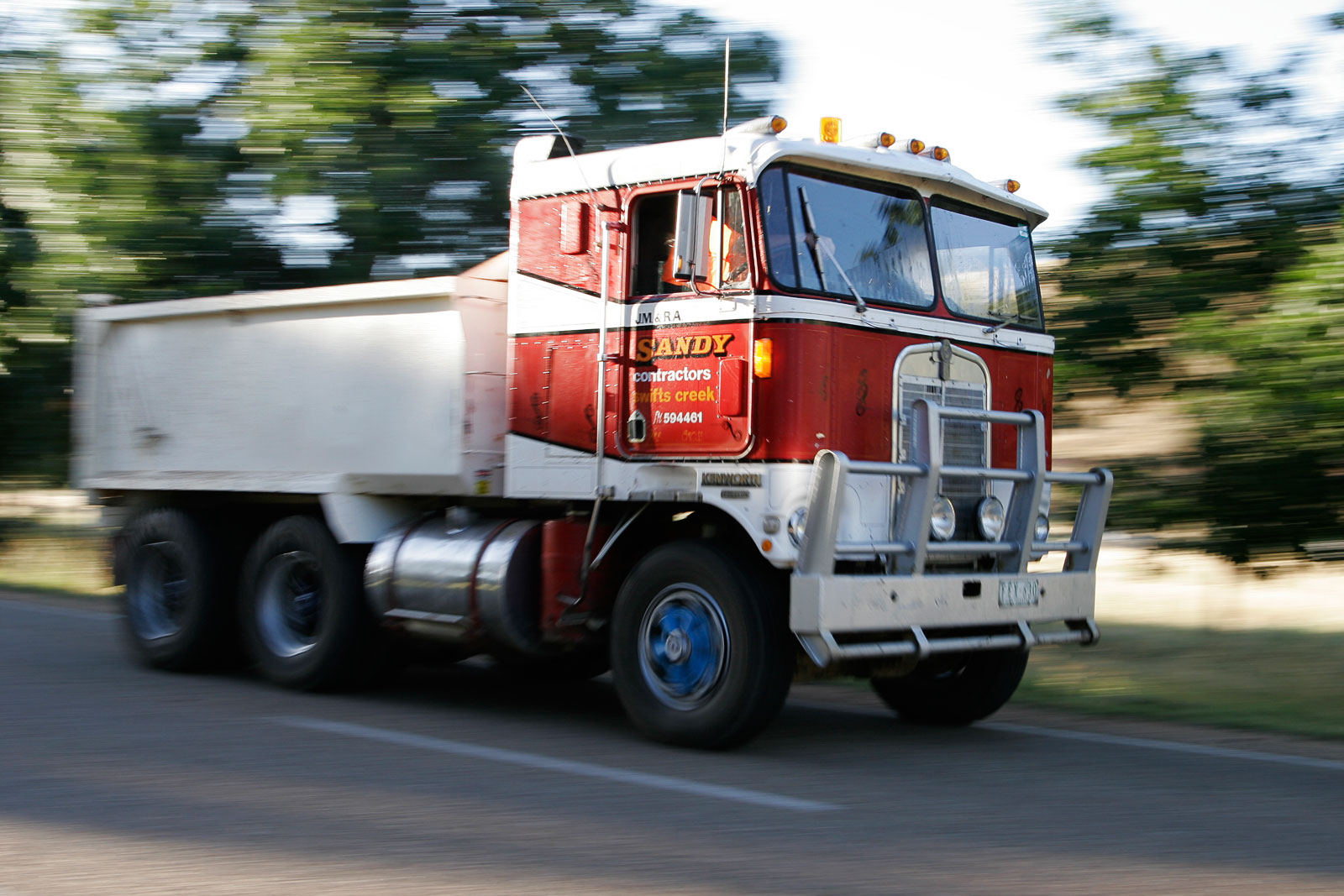
Slow shutter speed combined with panning the camera can achieve a motion blur for moving objects.

In photography, shutter speed or exposure time is the length of time that the film or digital sensor inside the camera is exposed to light (that is, when the camera's shutter is open) when taking a photograph. The amount of light that reaches the film or image sensor is proportional to the exposure time. 1/500 of a second will let half as much light in as 1/250.

== Introduction ==
Different shutter speeds for a spinning CPU fan. Shutter speeds from first to last: 2 s, 1 s, 1/10 s, 1/100 s, 1/200 s, 1/500 s, 1/1000 s, 1/2000 s, 1/4000 s

The camera's shutter speed, the lens's aperture or f-stop, and the scene's luminance together determine the amount of light that reaches the film or sensor (the exposure). Exposure value (EV) is a quantity that accounts for the shutter speed and the f-number. Once the sensitivity to light of the recording surface (either film or sensor) is set in numbers expressed in "ISOs" (e.g. 200 ISO, 400 ISO), the light emitted by the scene photographed can be controlled through aperture and shutter-speed to match the film or sensor sensitivity to light. This will achieve a good exposure when all the details of the scene are legible on the photograph. Too much light let into the camera results in an overly pale image (or "over-exposure") while too little light will result in an overly dark image (or "under-exposure").

Multiple combinations of shutter speed and f-number can give the same exposure value (E.V.). According to exposure value formula, doubling the exposure time doubles the amount of light (subtracts 1 EV). Reducing the aperture size at multiples of one over the square root of two lets half as much light into the camera, usually at a predefined scale of f/1, f/1.4, f/2, f/2.8, f/4, f/5.6, f/8, f/11, f/16, f/22, and so on. For example, f/8 lets four times more light into the camera as f/16 does. A shutter speed of 1/50 s with an f/4 aperture gives the same exposure value as a 1/100 s shutter speed with an f/2.8 aperture, and also the same exposure value as a 1/200 s shutter speed with an f/2 aperture, or 1/25 s at f/5.6.

In addition to its effect on exposure, the shutter speed changes the way movement appears in photographs. Very short shutter speeds can be used to freeze fast-moving subjects, for example at sporting events. Very long shutter speeds are used to intentionally blur a moving subject for effect. Short exposure times are sometimes called "fast", and long exposure times "slow".

Adjustments to the aperture need to be compensated by changes of the shutter speed to keep the same (right) exposure.

In early days of photography, available shutter speeds were not standardized, though a typical sequence might have been 1/10 s, 1/25 s, 1/50 s, 1/100 s, 1/200 s and 1/500 s; neither were apertures or film sensitivity (at least 3 different national standards existed). Soon this problem resulted in a solution consisting in the adoption of a standardized way of choosing aperture so that each major step exactly doubled or halved the amount of light entering the camera (f/2.8, f/4, f/5.6, f/8, f/11, f/16, etc.), a standardized 2:1 scale was adopted for shutter speed so that opening one aperture stop and reducing the amount of time of the shutter speed by one step resulted in the identical exposure. The agreed standards for shutter speeds are: 1/1000 s; 1/500 s; 1/250 s; 1/125 s; 1/60 s; 1/30 s; 1/15 s; 1/8 s; 1/4 s; 1/2 s; and 1 s.

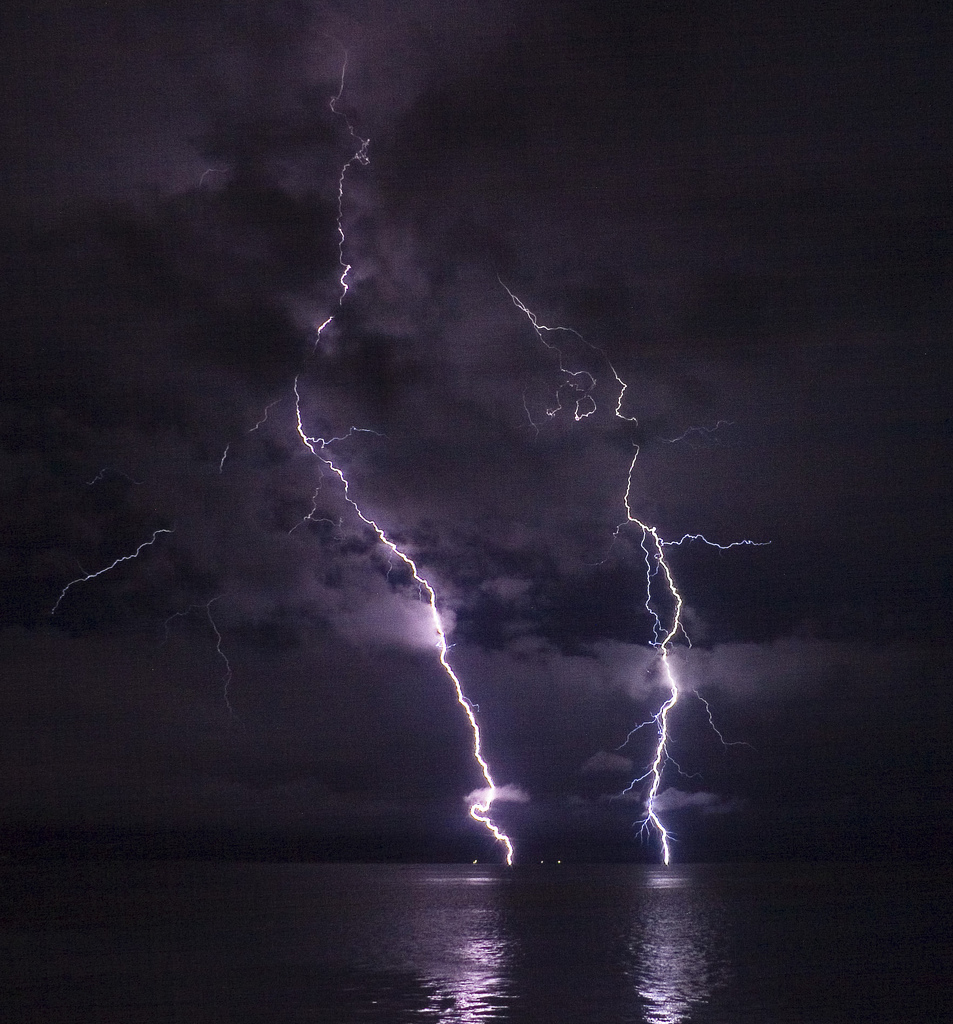
An extended exposure can also allow photographers to catch brief flashes of light, as seen here. Exposure time 15 seconds.

With this scale, each increment roughly doubles the amount of light (longer time) or halves it (shorter time).

Camera shutters often include one or two other settings for making very long exposures:

- B (for bulb) keeps the shutter open as long as the shutter release is held.
- T (for time) keeps the shutter open (once the shutter-release button had been depressed) until the shutter release is pressed again.

The ability of the photographer to take images without noticeable blurring by camera movement is an important parameter in the choice of the slowest possible shutter speed for a handheld camera. The rough guide used by most 35 mm photographers is that the slowest shutter speed that can be used easily without much blur due to camera shake is the shutter speed numerically closest to the lens focal length. For example, for handheld use of a 35 mm camera with a 50 mm normal lens, the closest shutter speed is 1/60 s (closest to "50"), while for a 200 mm lens it is recommended not to choose shutter speeds below 1/200 s. This rule can be augmented with knowledge of the intended application for the photograph, an image intended for significant enlargement and closeup viewing would require faster shutter speeds to avoid obvious blur. Through practice and special techniques such as bracing the camera, arms, or body to minimize camera movement, using a monopod or a tripod, slower shutter speeds can be used without blur. If a shutter speed is too slow for hand holding, a camera support, usually a tripod, must be used. Image stabilization in cameras or lenses allows slower shutter speeds to be used. Stabilization performance is expressed in stops of shutter speed, measured on a vibration apparatus by methods established by the Camera & Imaging Products Association (CIPA); Canon, for example, rates many of its stabilized lenses at about 4 or 5 stops (exposures 16 to 32 times longer). Because the test apparatus differs from real camera shake, results in practice may differ, and stabilization cannot correct blur caused by movement of the subject.

Shutter priority refers to a shooting mode used in cameras. It allows the photographer to choose a shutter speed setting and allow the camera to decide the correct aperture. This is sometimes referred to as Shutter Speed Priority Auto Exposure, or TV (time value on Canon cameras) mode, S mode on Nikons and most other brands.

== Creative utility in photography ==
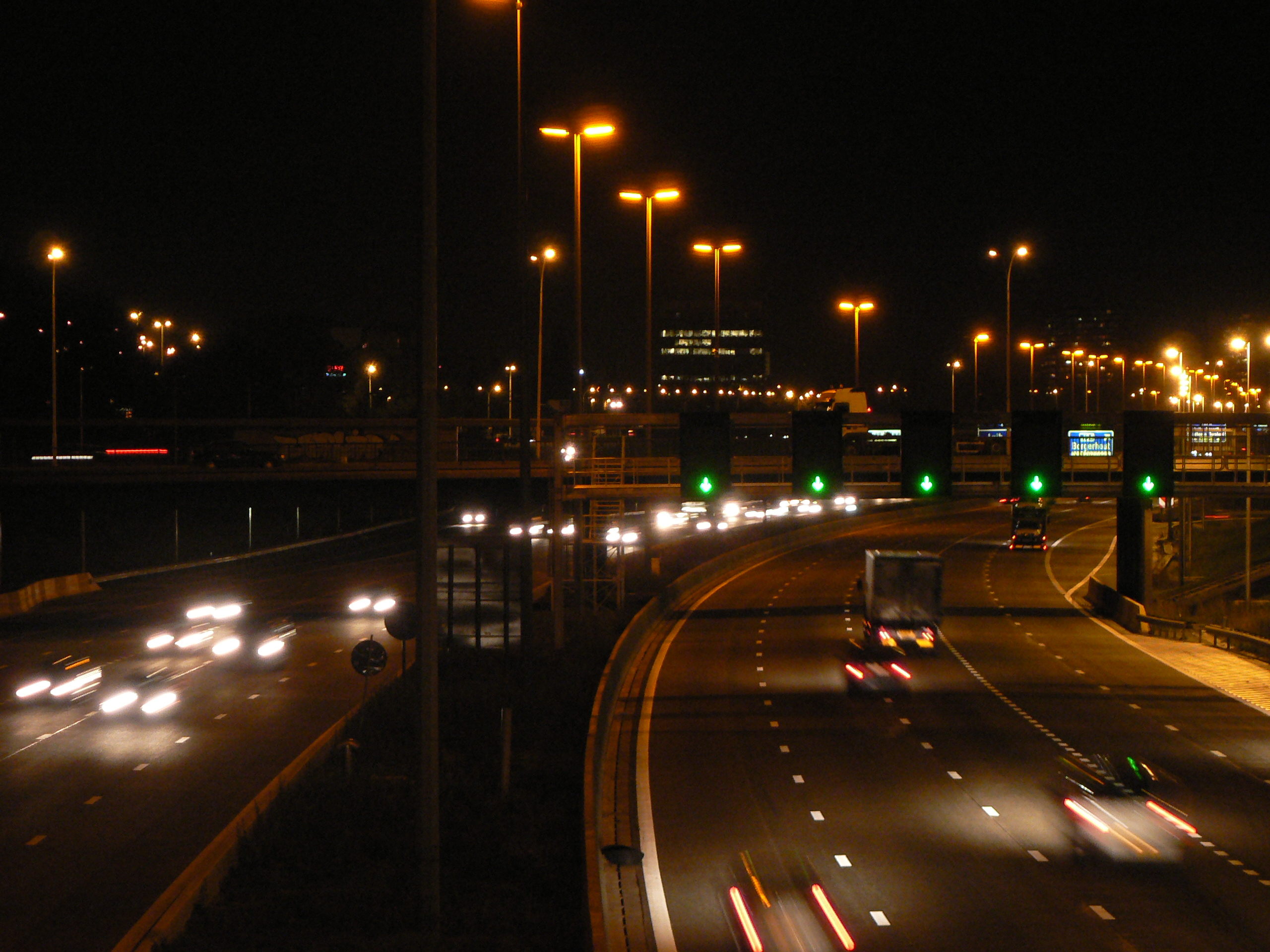
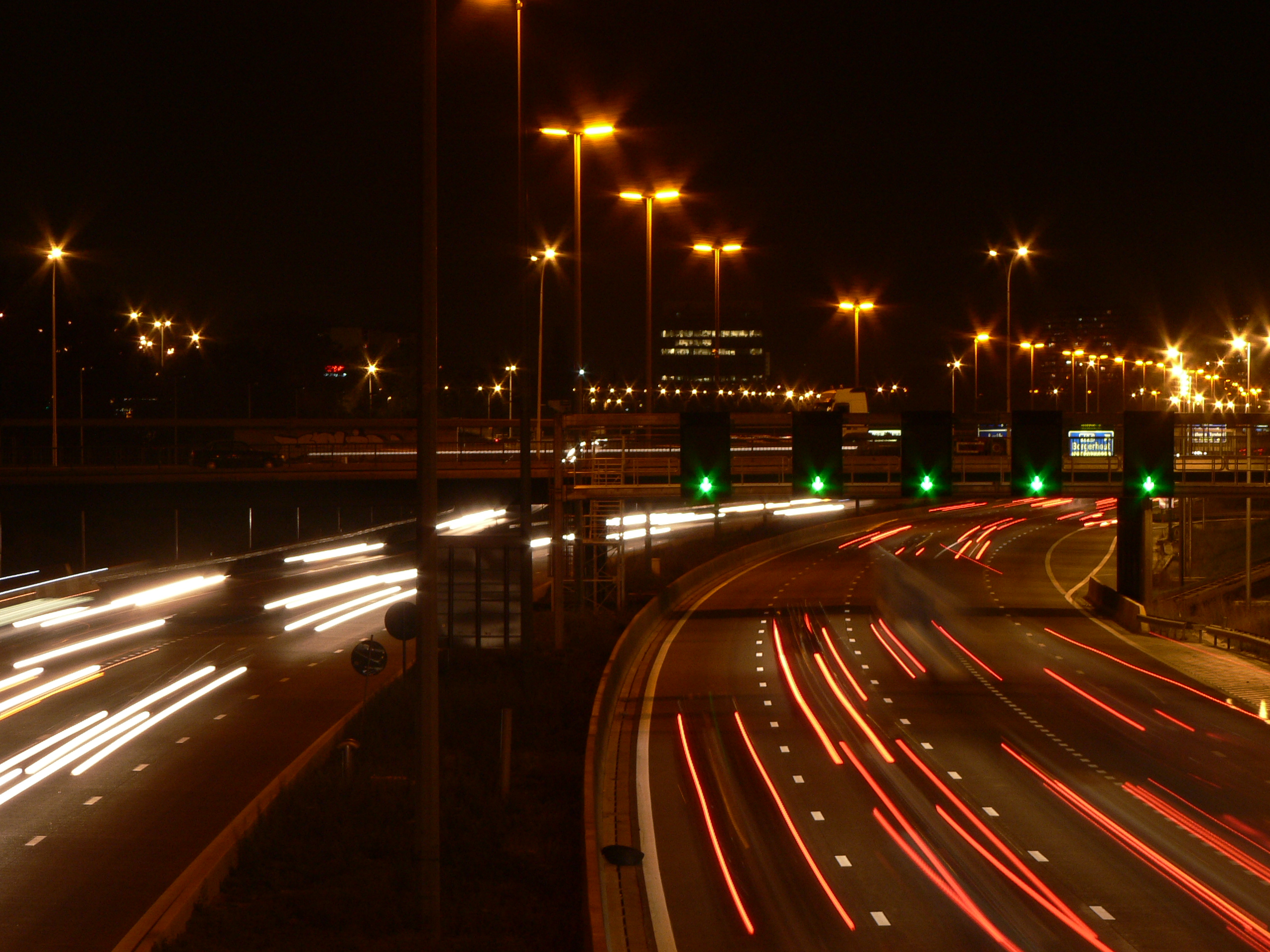
The photograph to the right was taken with a slower shutter speed than that to the left, creating a more pronounced motion blur effect and longer streaks of light from vehicle headlamps.

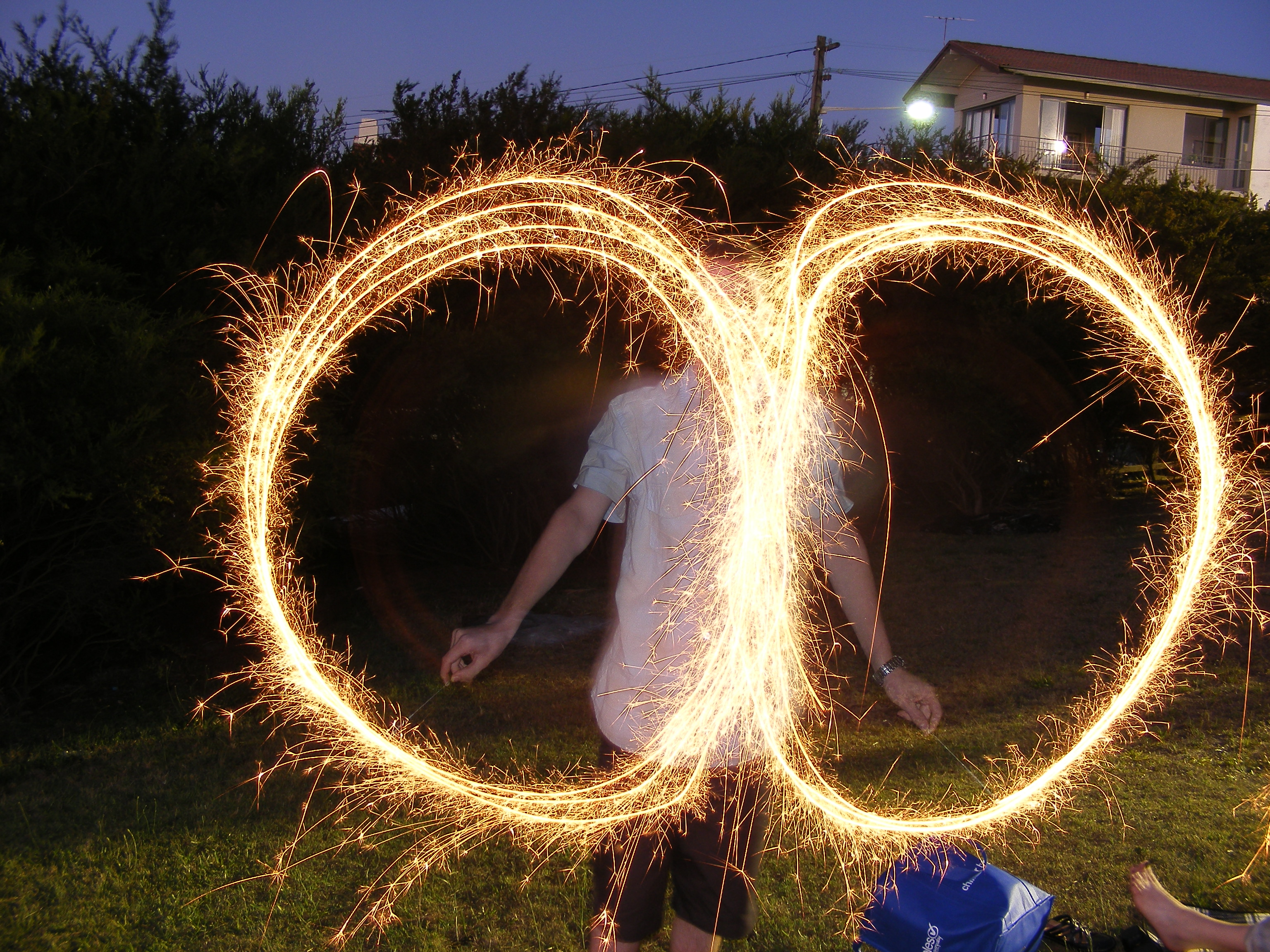
Sparklers moved in a circular motion with an exposure time of 4 seconds. This is an example of light painting.

Shutter speed is one of several methods used to control the amount of light recorded by the camera's digital sensor or film. It is also used to manipulate the visual effects of the final image.

Images taken with a lower shutter speed evoke a visual sense of movement. Exposure time 3 seconds.

Slower shutter speeds are often selected to suggest the movement of an object in a still photograph.

Excessively fast shutter speeds can cause a moving subject to appear unnaturally frozen. For instance, a running person may be caught with both feet in the air with all indication of movement lost in the frozen moment.

When a slower shutter speed is selected, a longer time passes from the moment the shutter opens till the moment it closes. More time is available for movement in the subject to be recorded by the camera as a blur.

A slightly slower shutter speed will allow the photographer to introduce an element of blur, either in the subject, where, in our example, the feet, which are the fastest moving element in the frame, might be blurred while the rest remains sharp; or if the camera is panned to follow a moving subject, the background is blurred while the subject remains relatively sharp.

The exact point at which the background or subject will start to blur depends on the speed at which the object is moving, the angle that the object is moving in relation to the camera, the distance it is from the camera and the focal length of the lens in relation to the size of the digital sensor or film.

When slower shutter-speeds, in excess of about half a second, are used on running water, the water in the photo will have a ghostly white appearance reminiscent of fog. This effect can be used in landscape photography.

Zoom burst is a technique which entails the variation of the focal length of a zoom lens during a longer exposure. In the moment that the shutter is opened, the lens is zoomed in, changing the focal length during the exposure. The center of the image remains sharp, while the details away from the center form a radial blur, which causes a strong visual effect, forcing the eye into the center of the image.

The following list provides an overview of common photographic uses for standard shutter speeds.

- 1/16,000 s and less: The fastest speed available in APS-H or APS-C format DSLR cameras (as of 2012). (Canon EOS 1D, Nikon D1, D1X, and D1H)
- 1/12,000 s: The fastest speed available in any 35 mm film SLR camera. (Minolta Maxxum 9xi, Maxxum 9
- 1/8000 s: The fastest speed available in most production SLR cameras (as of 2013), also the fastest speed available in any full-frame DSLR or SLT camera (as of 2013). Used to take sharp photographs of very fast subjects, such as birds or planes, under good lighting conditions, with an ISO speed of 1,000 or more and a large-aperture lens.
- 1/4000 s: The fastest speed available in consumer SLR cameras (as of 2009); also the fastest speed available in any leaf shutter camera (such as the Sony Cyber-shot DSC-RX1) (as of 2013). Used to take sharp photographs of fast subjects, such as athletes or vehicles, under good lighting conditions and with an ISO setting of up to 800.
- 1/2000 s and 1/1000 s: Used to take sharp photographs of moderately fast subjects under normal lighting conditions.
- 1/500 s and 1/250 s: Used to take sharp photographs of people in motion in everyday situations. 1/250 s is the fastest speed useful for panning; it also allows for a smaller aperture (up to f/11) in motion shots, and hence for a greater depth of field.
- 1/125 s: This speed, and slower ones, are no longer useful for freezing motion. 1/125 s is used to obtain greater depth of field and overall sharpness in landscape photography, and is also often used for panning shots.
- 1/60 s: Used for panning shots, for images taken under dim lighting conditions, and for available light portraits.
- 1/30 s: Used for panning subjects moving slower than 30 miles per hour (48 km/h) and for available-light photography. Images taken at this and slower speeds normally require a tripod or an image stabilized lens/camera to be sharp.
- 1/15 s and 1/8 s: This and slower speeds are useful for photographs other than panning shots where motion blur is employed for deliberate effect, or for taking sharp photographs of immobile subjects under bad lighting conditions with a tripod-supported camera.
- 1/4 s, 1/2 s and 1 s: Also mainly used for motion blur effects and/or low-light photography, but only practical with a tripod-supported camera.
- B (bulb) (fraction of second to several hours): Used with a mechanically fixed camera in astrophotography and for certain special effects.
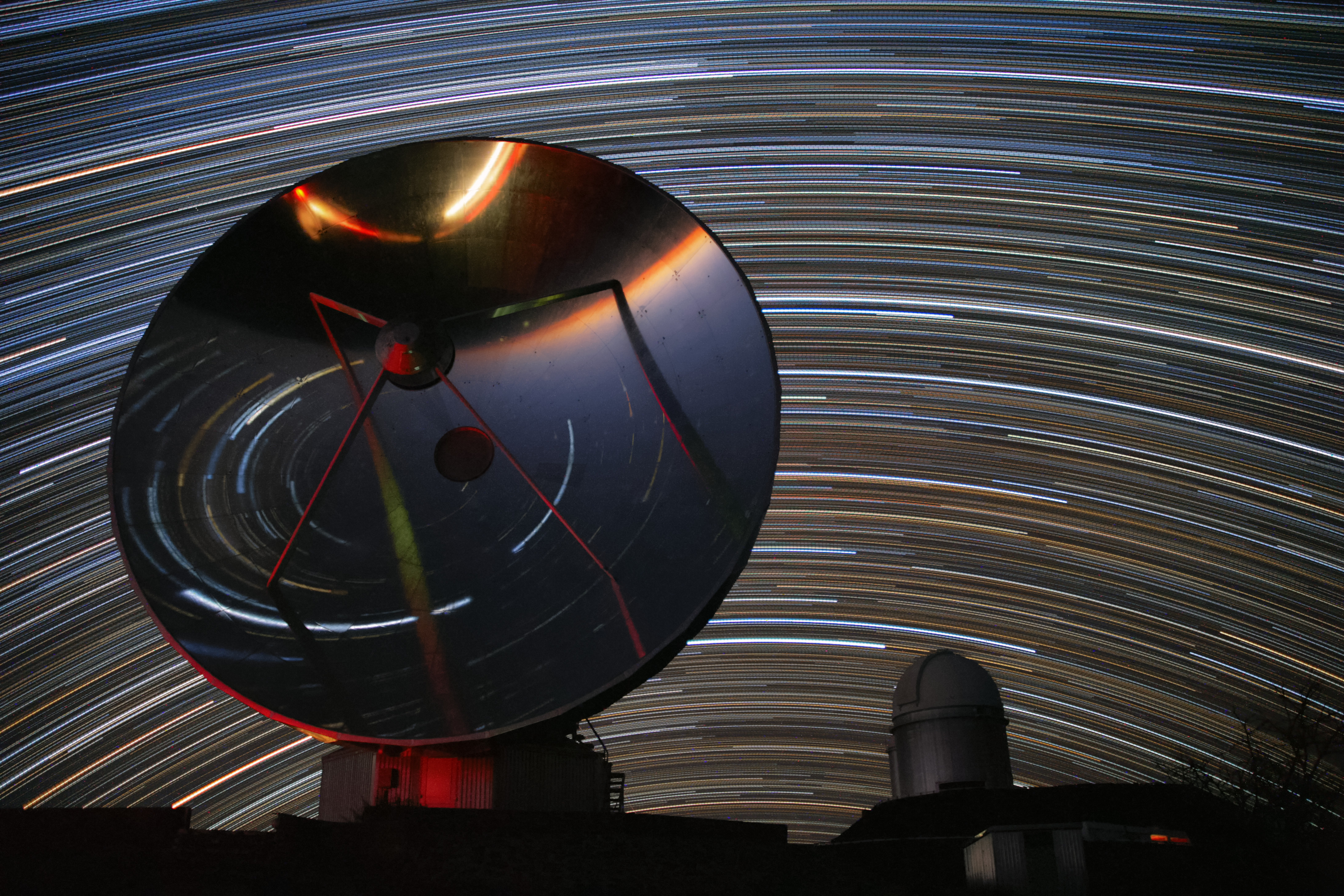
Star trails like these are created by using a long exposure to capture the apparent motion of the stars.

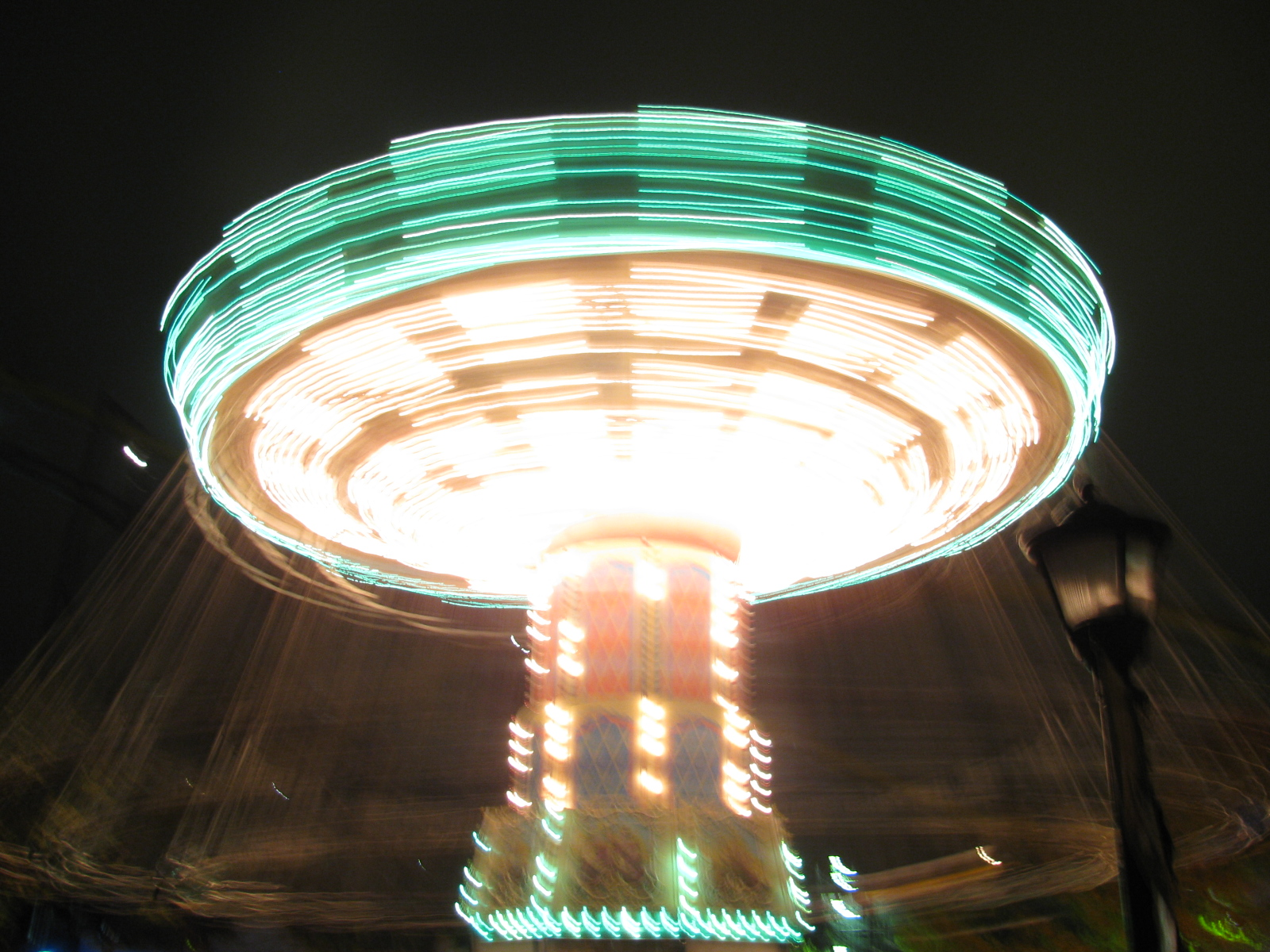
The Whirligig (now DC Super-Villains Swing) ride during night at Six Flags Great America at an exposure time of 0.8 seconds.

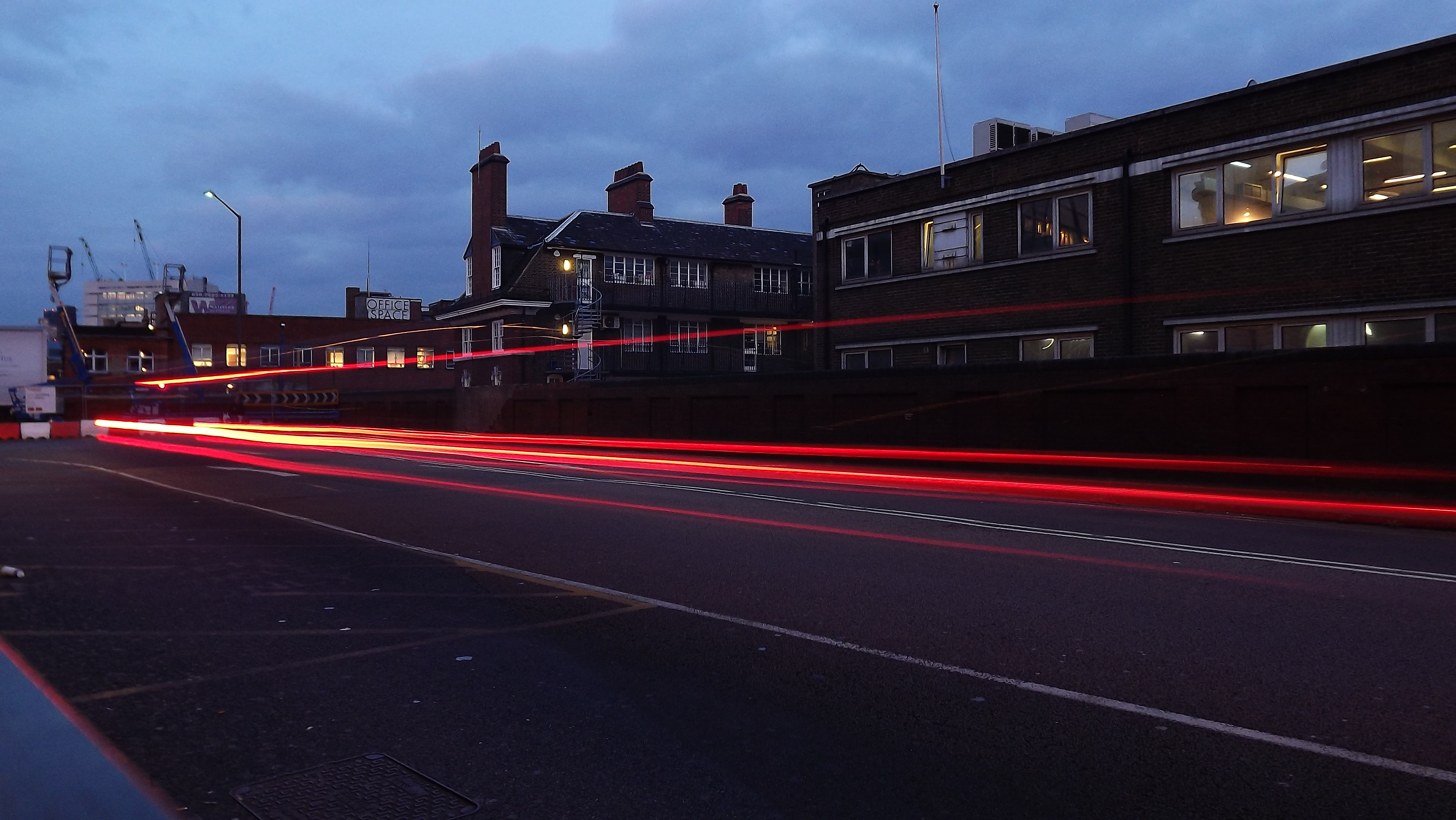
Light streaks outside London Waterloo station.

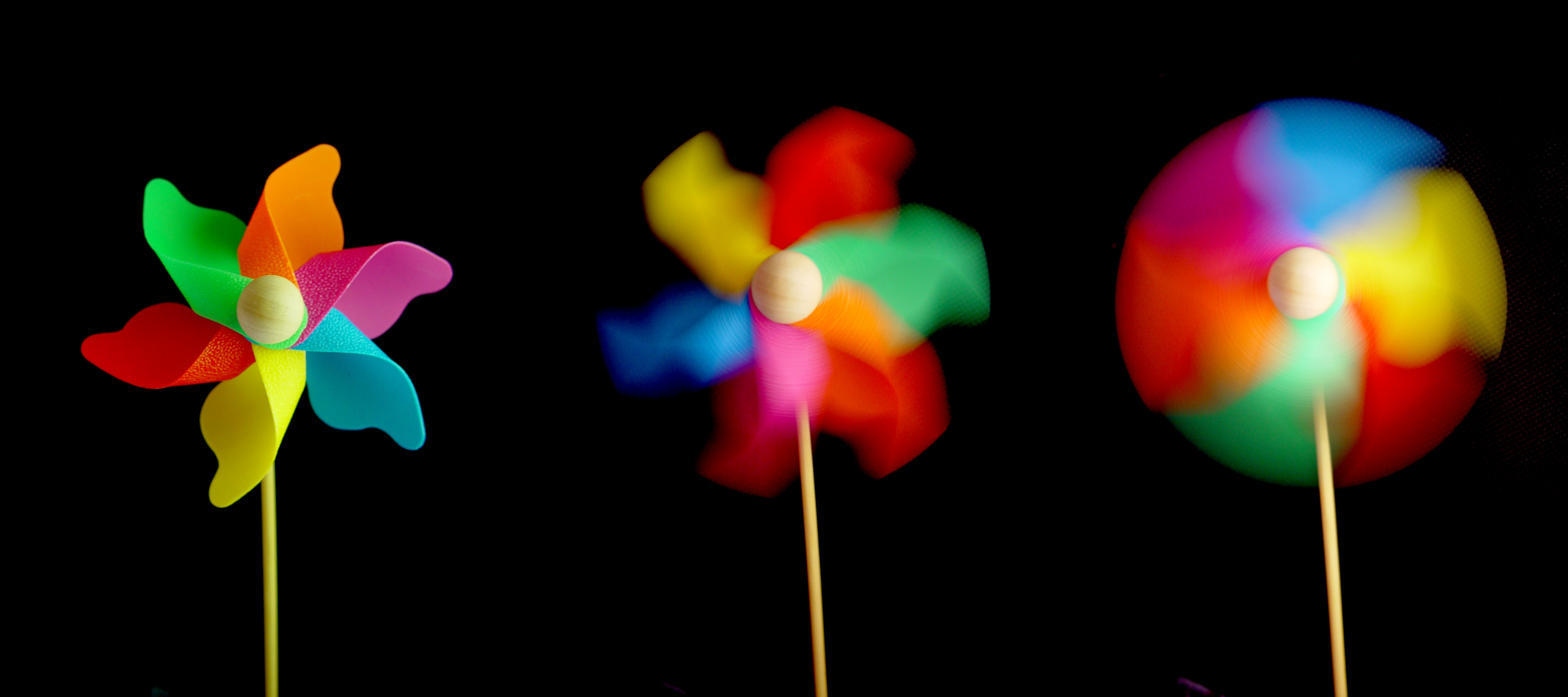
Effect of different shutter speeds on photograph.

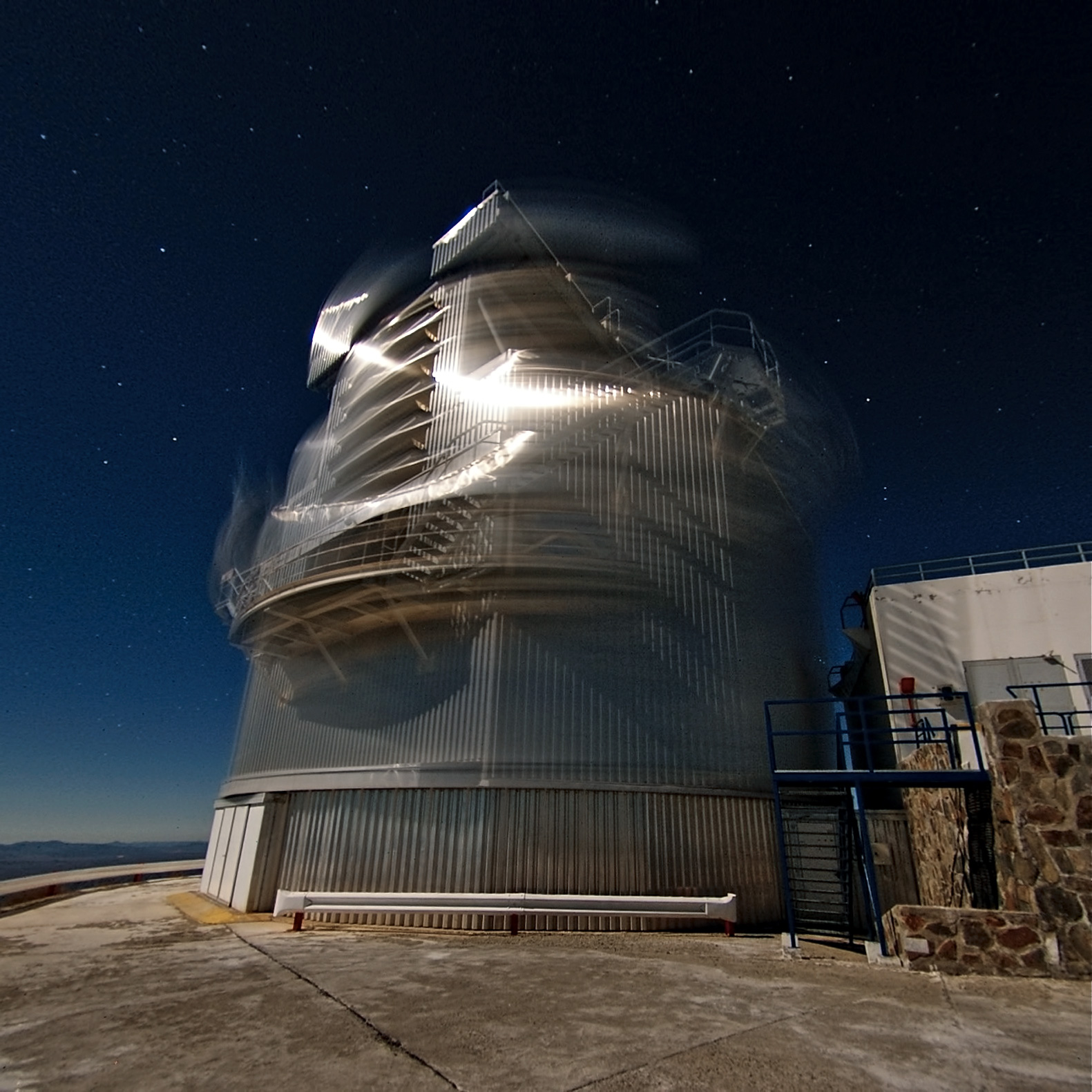
A 30-second exposure of the rotating New Technology Telescope

== Cinematographic shutter formula ==
Motion picture cameras used in traditional film cinematography employ a mechanical rotating shutter. The shutter rotation is synchronized with film being pulled through the gate, hence shutter speed is a function of the frame rate and shutter angle.

Where E = shutter speed (reciprocal of exposure time in seconds), F = frames per second, and S = shutter angle:

$E = \frac {F \cdot 360^\circ}{S}$, for E in reciprocal seconds

$$S = \frac {F \cdot 360^\circ}{E}$$

With a traditional shutter angle of 180°, film is exposed for 1/48 second at 24 frame/s. To avoid effect of light interference when shooting under artificial lights or when shooting television screens and computer monitors, 1/50 s (172.8°) or 1/60 s (144°) shutter is often used.

Electronic video cameras do not have mechanical shutters and allow setting shutter speed directly in time units. Professional video cameras often allow selecting shutter speed in terms of shutter angle instead of time units, especially those that are capable of overcranking or undercranking.

== See also ==
- Exposure (photography)
- Exposure value
- F-number
- Shutter (photography)
- Preferred number
- Chronophotography
