= Minolta 9xi =

35mm SLR camera

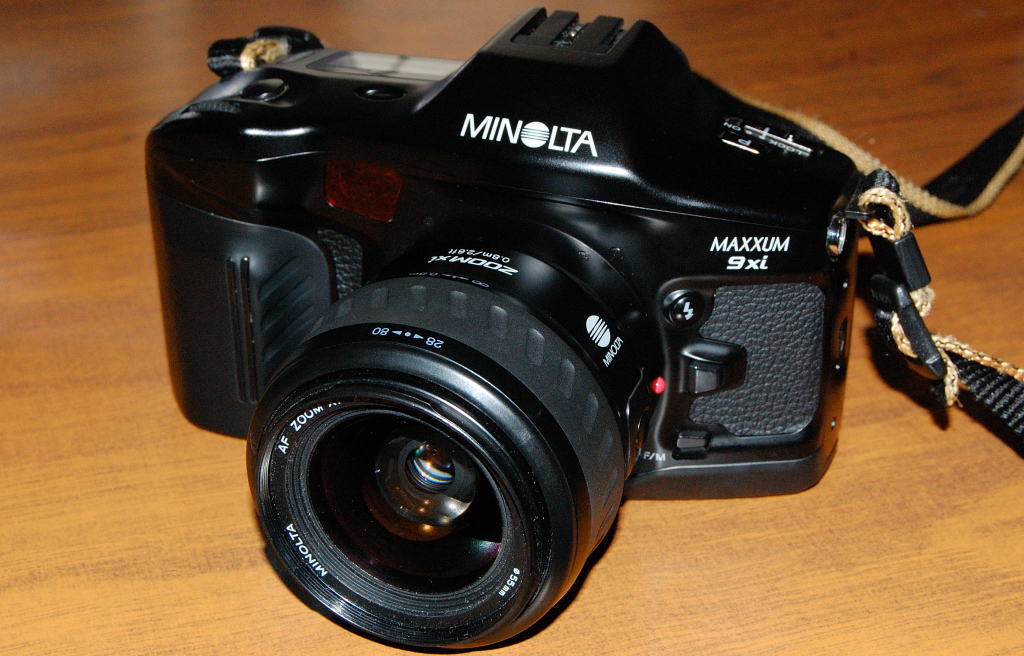

Overview
- Maker: Minolta
- Type: 35mm SLR

Lens
- Lens mount: Minolta A-Mount

Focusing
- Focus: TTL phase detection autofocus (4 sensors)

Exposure/metering
- Exposure: 14-segment honeycomb evaluative metering

Flash
- Flash: External flash

Shutter
- Frame rate: 4.5 frame/s

The Minolta 9xi was, when released in 1992, an advanced 35 mm single-lens reflex camera design. According to the company, it incorporated the world's "fastest autofocus system", had a maximum shutter speed of 1/12000 of a second, and had a 14-zone metering system. It has a shooting speed of 4.5 frames per second without the additional motor pack, a shutter speed of 1/12000 of a second due to carbon-reinforced shutter blades, a pentaprism, and it is compatible with xi zoom lenses having a "power zoom function".

== Design ==
The Minolta 9xi has smoothed contours with buttons that were largely hidden or placed directly by the fingers controlling them.

== Technology ==
The Minolta 9xi records at 5 frames per second without an external motor or battery pack, coupled with the four-sensor autofocus system that could continuously track not only horizontally but vertically and diagonally—even when an object came towards the camera. The autofocus system could focus at light levels of −1 eV and up to 19 eV (at ISO 100). It also used a 14-segment light metering system, variations of which have been used for many years in most Minolta cameras. It featured a 1/300 of a second x-sync flash synchronization with stepless shutter speeds from 1/12000 of a second to 30 seconds in Program and Aperture Priority mode.

The camera could, without any external backs, bracket three exposures, each 1/2 a stop different (each way). It could control a wireless flash system. The 9xi was capable of detecting if the photographer had their eye placed against the viewfinder; it was named "eye-start".

== Criticism ==
The 9xi was and is criticized for many design choices. One was that it used the "creative cards" system, with cards adding cost and being "impractical for the camera's intended market". Some functions (the "custom functions" card being the main offender) were already present in the 8000i's camera but only accessible by buying the card—this was seen as an attempt to "milk" the market. The camera lacks a built-in flash, which was seen as an attempt by Minolta to appeal to more professionally inclined photographers.

The camera was also criticized for its heavily "computerized" interface, with few buttons and many functions only accessible behind the card door.

The 9xi used both the older Minolta AF lenses and the xi-series lenses. Some of the new xi lenses had a new "powerzoom" function where the zoom ring electronically zoomed the lens via a motor. Lastly, the 9xi lacked a vertical grip, only having a "battery grip", while adding support for AA batteries.

== Specification ==
Minolta 9xi body parts photo 1.b

The Minolta Dynax/Maxxum specifications are as follows:

- AF system: Minolta's through-the-lens (TTL) phase-detection system with four CCD sensors; activated by Eye-start; multi-dimensional predictive focus control; built in AF illuminator automatically activated in low light or low contrast conditions; AF sensitivity range: EV −1 to 19 (at ISO100); AF illuminator range: 0.7 to 9 m (based on Minolta's standard test methods)
- Metering: TTL-type; 14-segment honeycomb-pattern silicon photocell (SPC) automatically activated by Eye-start; second SPC for TTL flash metering of dedicated flash unit; range: honeycomb-pattern EV 0–20, center-weighted average EV 0–20, spot EV 3–20 (ISO100, 50 mm f1.4 lens)
- Shutter Electronically controlled, vertical-traverse, focal-plane type; automatic speeds: in P and A modes, stepless 1/12000 to 30 seconds with nearest half-stop displayed; manual speeds: in S and M modes, 1/12000 to 30 sec in nearest 1/2-stop increments plus BULB in M modes; x-sync shutter speed: 1/300 second; x-sync shutter speed in wireless/remote flash mode: 1/60 (1/30 second in ratio)
- Viewfinder: Eye-level fixed pentaprism showing 92% of vertical and 94% of horizontal field of view; magnification: 0.75× with 50 mm lens at infinity; transparent LCD screen and Acute-Matte screen; diopter: −2.5 to +0.5 adjustable; long eye-relief.
- Focusing screen Changeable at an authorized Minolta service facility; type L (matte field with grid) or type S (matte field with vertical-horizontal scales)
- Film-speed range Automatic range: ISO 25–5000 in 1/3-stop increments; manual range: ISO 6–6400 in 1/3-stop increments
- Power 6-volt 2CR5 lithium battery
- Battery performance Approximately 50 rolls (based on Minolta's standard test method, using 24-exposure rolls)
- Dimensions 6 7/16 × 3 7/8 × 2 1/2 inches (163 × 98.5 × 64 mm)
- Weight 1 lb 10 1/8 oz (740 g) without lens and battery; Quartz Data Back model: 1 lb 10 5/8 oz (750 g) without lens and battery

Class	1985	1986	1987	1988	1989	1990	1991	1992	1993	1994	1995	1996	1997	1998	1999	2000	2001	2002	2003	2004	2005	2006
Higher flagship	9000 AF							9xi						9/9Ti								
Higher flagship																7						
Higher flagship																	7 Limited					
Lower flagship													800si									
Enthusiast	7000 AF				7000i																	
Enthusiast							8000i															
Enthusiast							7xi															
Enthusiast									700si													
Higher entry-Level		5000			5000i																	
Higher entry-Level								5xi														
Higher entry-Level										400si												
Higher entry-Level											500si			505si			5					
Higher entry-Level											600si classic			505si super								
Higher entry-Level																				70/60		
Lower entry-Level
Lower entry-Level					3000i																	
Lower entry-Level							3xi															
Lower entry-Level						2xi																
Lower entry-Level											300si				404si			4				
Lower entry-Level																			3			
Lower entry-Level																				50/40		
