= L'Héautontimorouménos =

1857 poem written by Charles Baudelaire

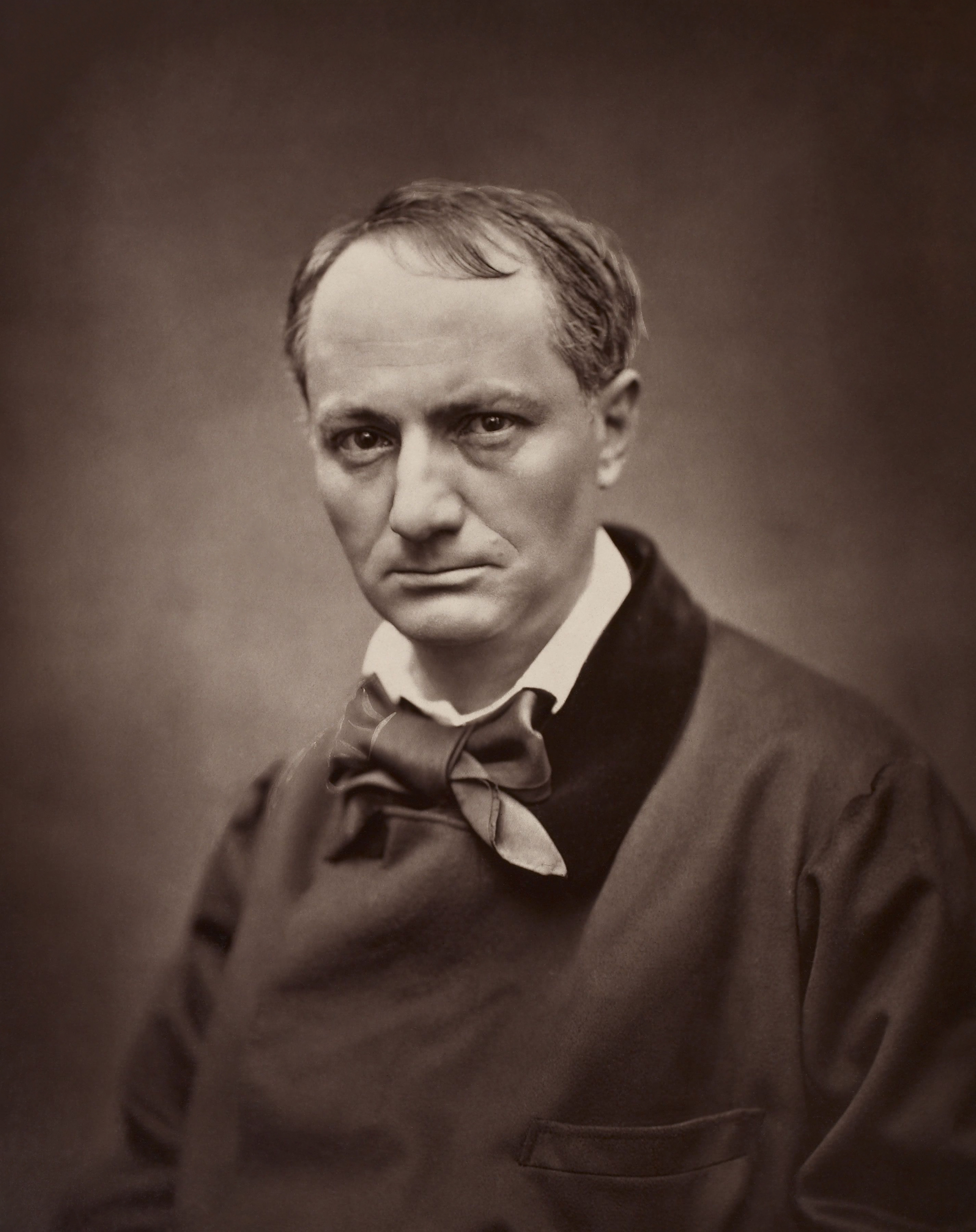
Charles Baudelaire by Étienne Carjat

L'Héautontimorouménos (Greek: Ἑαυτὸν τιμωρούμενος, Heauton timōroumenos; English: The Self-Tormentor) is a poem by the French poet Charles Baudelaire, the eighty-third poem of the Spleen et Idéal section of his 1857 poetry collection Les Fleurs du mal.

The poem takes its title from a play by the Roman dramatist Terence.

== Text ==
Je te frapperai sans colère
Et sans haine, comme un boucher,
Comme Moïse le rocher !
Et je ferai de ta paupière,

Pour abreuver mon Saharah,
Jaillir les eaux de la souffrance.
Mon désir gonflé d’espérance
Sur tes pleurs salés nagera

Comme un vaisseau qui prend le large,
Et dans mon cœur qu’ils soûleront
Tes chers sanglots retentiront
Comme un tambour qui bat la charge !

Ne suis-je pas un faux accord
Dans la divine symphonie,
Grâce à la vorace Ironie
Qui me secoue et qui me mord ?

Elle est dans ma voix, la criarde !
C’est tout mon sang, ce poison noir !
Je suis le sinistre miroir
Où la mégère se regarde.

Je suis la plaie et le couteau !
Je suis le soufflet et la joue !
Je suis les membres et la roue,
Et la victime et le bourreau !

Je suis de mon cœur le vampire,
- Un de ces grands abandonnés
Au rire éternel condamnés,
Et qui ne peuvent plus sourire !

Translation:

I will strike you without anger
And without hate, like a butcher,
Like Moses striking the rock!
And I will cause from your eye,

To irrigate my Sahara,
To spurt the waters of suffering.
My desire swelled with hope
Will swim over your salty tears

Like a ship sailing to sea,
And in my heart which they'll intoxicate
Your dear sights will resound
Like a drum beating the advance!

Am I not a false chord
In the divine symphony,
Thanks to the voracious Irony
Which shakes and bites me?

She's in my voice, the shrill girl!
That black poison is all my blood!
I am the sinister mirror
Where Megaera looks at herself.

I am the wound and the knife!
I am the slap and the cheek!
I am the limbs and the wheel,
And the victim and the executioner!

I am the vampire of my own heart,
One of those great abandoned ones
Who are condemned to eternal laughter
And who can smile no more!

== Analysis ==
In the Book of Numbers, as Moses leads the Israelites through the desert to the Promised Land, God commands him to tell a rock to give him water. Instead Moses strikes the rock twice. Water jets from the rock, but God is angry with Moses for disobeying his instructions and thus usurping responsibility for the miracle, and for this Moses is forbidden from himself entering the Promised Land. The compulsive laughter of the final stanza is a reference to Melmoth the Wanderer, whose laughter, Baudelaire writes in his essay on "The Essence of Laughter," is "the perpetual explosion of his anger and his suffering."

Jean Prévost writes that the poem "begins with the three most sadistic strophes that Baudelaire ever composed." In his book on Baudelaire, Prévost articulates the account of the poem's writing under which L'Héautontimorouménos is the work Baudelaire was conceiving when he wrote in a letter to Victor de Mars of "an Epilogue, addressed to a woman." However, this has been disputed.

Jean-Paul Sartre characterizes Baudelaire as a man forever looking into himself. According to Sartre, external objects have for Baudelaire a veiled, denatured reality; they interest him only as occasions to inspect his own consciousness, and his crisis stems from the fact that this consciousness continually eludes him through his very immersion. He is unable to see or estimate himself as he sees or estimates others, as a coherent being with motivations and qualities. Thus he tries to "become two," and bends his effort on reflexive consciousness, on dividing himself to allow for self-knowledge and self-possession. This, for Sartre, is the drama of L'Héautontimorouménos. Because he can't see himself, Baudelaire will appropriate himself as the executioner appropriates the victim, and will satisfy his need for knowing what he holds through the violent probing force of the dagger. Other authors have remarked that it is this self-consciousness or "Irony" that makes the poem's narrator "a false chord in the divine symphony."

Jean Starobinski, like Sartre, associates L'Héautontimorouménos with two lines from L'Irremediable: "Tête-à-tête sombre et limpide / Qu'un coeur devenu son miroir." ("Somber clear dialogue / Of a heart become its own mirror."). He notes that these two poems, as well as in Le Cygne ("The Swan"), feature a characteristically Baudelaireian "melancholy that aggravates in reflecting itself," and reminds the reader that the laugh in Baudelaire, along with the images in mirrors and the experience of melancholy itself, is affiliated to Satan. He further quotes an anecdote from Charles Asselineau's biography of Baudelaire, in which Baudelaire, afflicted with tertiary syphilis, is unable to stop laughing. Starobinski claims that Baudelaire, in L'Héautontimorouménos, makes the same account of melancholy as will later be elaborated in Mourning and Melancholia where Freud writes: "If one listens patiently to a melancholic's many and various self-accusations, one cannot in the end avoid the impression that often the most violent of them are hardly at all applicable to the patient himself, but that with insignificant modifications they do fit someone else, someone whom the patient loves or has loved or should love." The melancholic's accusation against the object is the same accusation he directs against himself, meaning Baudelaire's sadism and masochism are one and the same.

The poem is seven four-line stanzas of alexandrines in rimes embrassées (ABBA rhyme scheme). The first three quatrains of the poem oppose an "I" and a "you" representing the narrator and a woman with whom he is in a sadistic relationship. The poem pivots at the fourth stanza, which both shifts the poem from the future to the present tense as well as representing the only question posed in the poem. From there the "I" and "you" become identified, and the narrator turns his sadism towards himself. It is notable that the narrator only compares himself to a butcher when speaking of the other, while he actually declares himself to be his own executioner. According to Fabrice Wilhelm in his book on Baudelaire and narcissism, the comparison to Moses can give rise to several interpretations, depending on whether more weight is given to the miracle of the water or to Moses' doubt of God's instructions. In Wilhelm's own interpretation, Baudelaire believes homage to woman has usurped divine praise in the splenetic heart, but man doubts of women just as he doubted God.

Wilhelm also speaks of the "lying mirrors" (miroirs menteurs) in Baudelaire. As seen in his poem Correspondances, considered his ars poetica, Baudelaire takes humanity as longing for an ideal world of harmony that it obscurely recalls through experiences of the numinous. This is represented in the "divine symphony" of the poem. According to Wilhelm, this nostalgia presents two distinct paths: not spleen and ideal, but ideal and false ideal, the world of art sought out by the heroic poet and the world of ephemeral pleasure frequented by the "vile multitude" from his poem Recueillement. Wilhelm quotes from Le Goût de l'Infini ("The Taste for Infinity," from Baudelaire's Les Paradis artificiels) an excerpt postulating moments of reminiscence that are like "a magic mirror where man is invited to see himself as beautiful" (un miroir magique où l'homme est invité à se voir en beau). Women are important to this experience of nostalgia, as representing the ideal and the false ideal, as well as the mechanism of the reminiscence (Baudelaire famously wrote to his mother of his "period of passionate love" for her, before the arrival of General Aupick, his stepfather). Here, the woman is Magaera, one of the Furies of Greek mythology.

== Dedication to J.G.F. ==
The poem is dedicated "To J.G.F." It shares this dedication with Les Paradis artificiels, though J.G.F. only appears on L'Héautontimorouménos from the 1861 edition of Les Fleurs du mal. In the first edition of 1857 the poem is dedicated "To M. J." The identity of J.G.F. has proved an enduring mystery in Baudelaire studies, and has sometimes distracted scholars from the merits of the poem. Michel Butor speaks of the poem as "dedicated, without any doubt, to Jeanne [Duval], under the veil of the mysterious initials J.G.F." The fact that Les Paradis artificiels is also dedicated to J.G.F. has given rise to a strain of thought which extends the influence of Thomas De Quincey's Confessions of an English Opium Eater on Les Paradis artificiels to L'Héautontimorouménos: under this reading, J.G.F. is a sister figure akin to De Quincey's Ann, the mysterious orphan girl who shared De Quincey's struggle while he was starving on the streets of London as a child. This constructed sister figure is also found in the famous L'Invitation au voyage.

In Baudelaire the Damned, F.W.J. Hemmings writes of Baudelaire's mother's miscarriage of a baby girl: "It is more than just convention that makes one use the word unfortunately here; it might well have made all the difference to Baudelaire's personal happiness in his childhood, and to his relations with women in later life, if he had grown up with this little companion and had had the same kind of charmingly confidential relations with her as Stendhal, Lamartine, Balzac and Flaubert had with their younger sisters."

== In music ==
Léo Ferré set this poem to music and recorded it as a demo in 1977, but it was not released in his lifetime. The song was also performed by Jean-Louis Murat in 2007 on his album Charles et Léo. Ferré's version was finally released with twenty other Baudelaire poems in his posthumous album titled Les Fleurs du mal (suite et fin) (2008). Diamanda Galás also performed the song in her album Saint of the Pit (1986).
