= Portrait of Charles Baudelaire =

Painting by Gustave Courbet

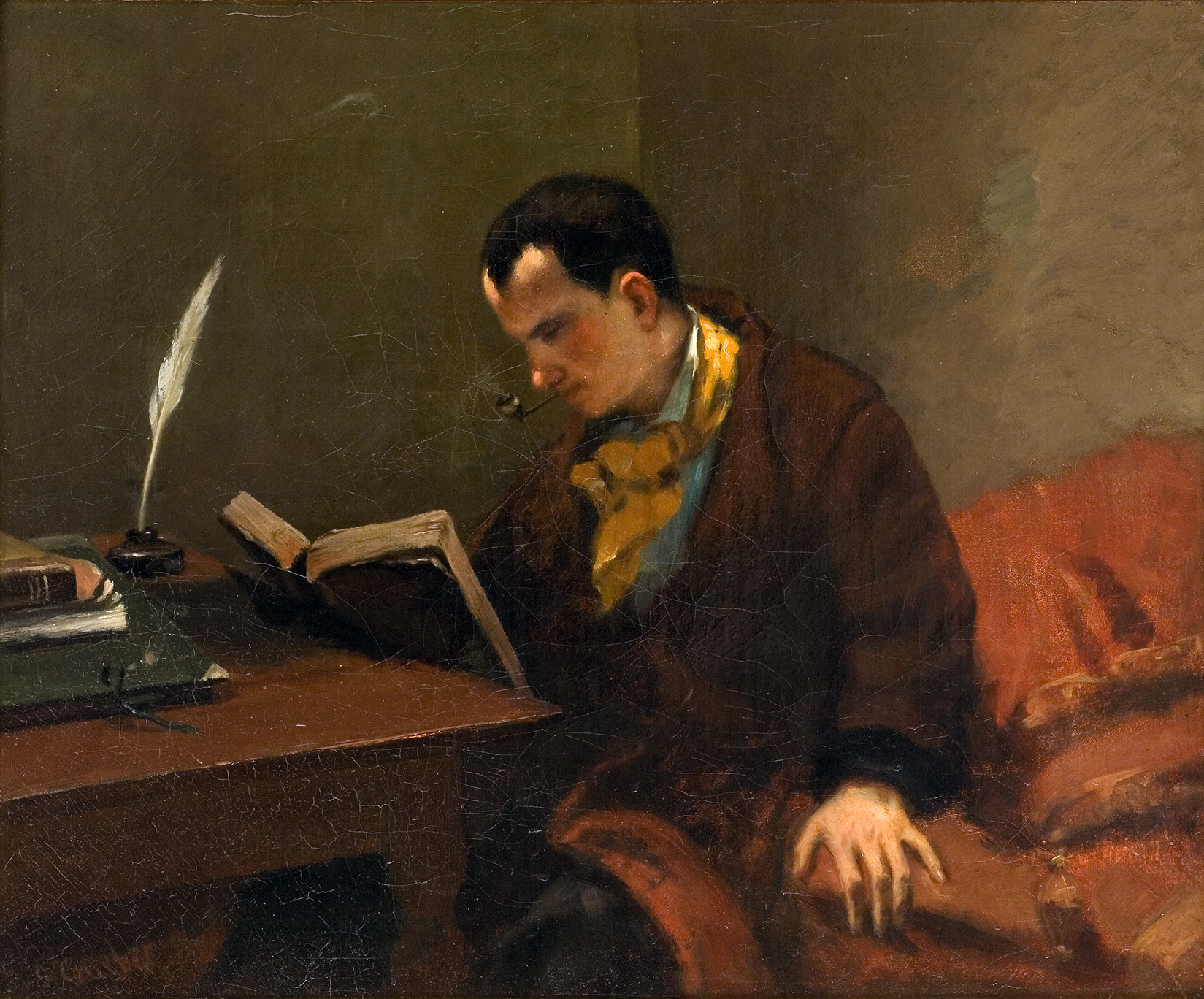
- Artist: Gustave Courbet
- Year: c. 1848–49
- Medium: oil on canvas
- Dimensions: 54 cm × 65 cm (21 in × 26 in)
- Location: Musée Fabre; Montpellier

Portrait of Charles Baudelaire is an oil-on-canvas portrait of the poet Charles Baudelaire by the French painter Gustave Courbet. It was painted in 1848 or early 1849, at a time when the poet and the painter had established a friendship.

== History and description ==
It was shown in the Courbet Pavilion at the Exposition Universelle of 1855, and was bought four years later by the publisher Auguste Poulet-Malassis, who then nominally sold it to Charles Asselineau on 15 June 1862 to prevent it being seized. Alfred Bruyas acquired it for 3000 francs and in 1876 gave it to the Musée Fabre in Montpellier, where it still hangs.

This painting represents Baudelaire, then aged 26 years old. He depicts his young poet friend as a "damned poet". This painting was painted when Baudelaire was still rather unknown. Baudelaire is depicted in the center, immersed in his thoughts and inspiration. Courbet presents the classic elements of a writer with his pen and books. The colors used are dark but the light highlights the decor and not Baudelaire, which creates a parallel with the Spleen and the Ideal.
