= L'albatros (poem) =

Poem by Charles Baudelaire

L'Albatros
- by Charles Baudelaire
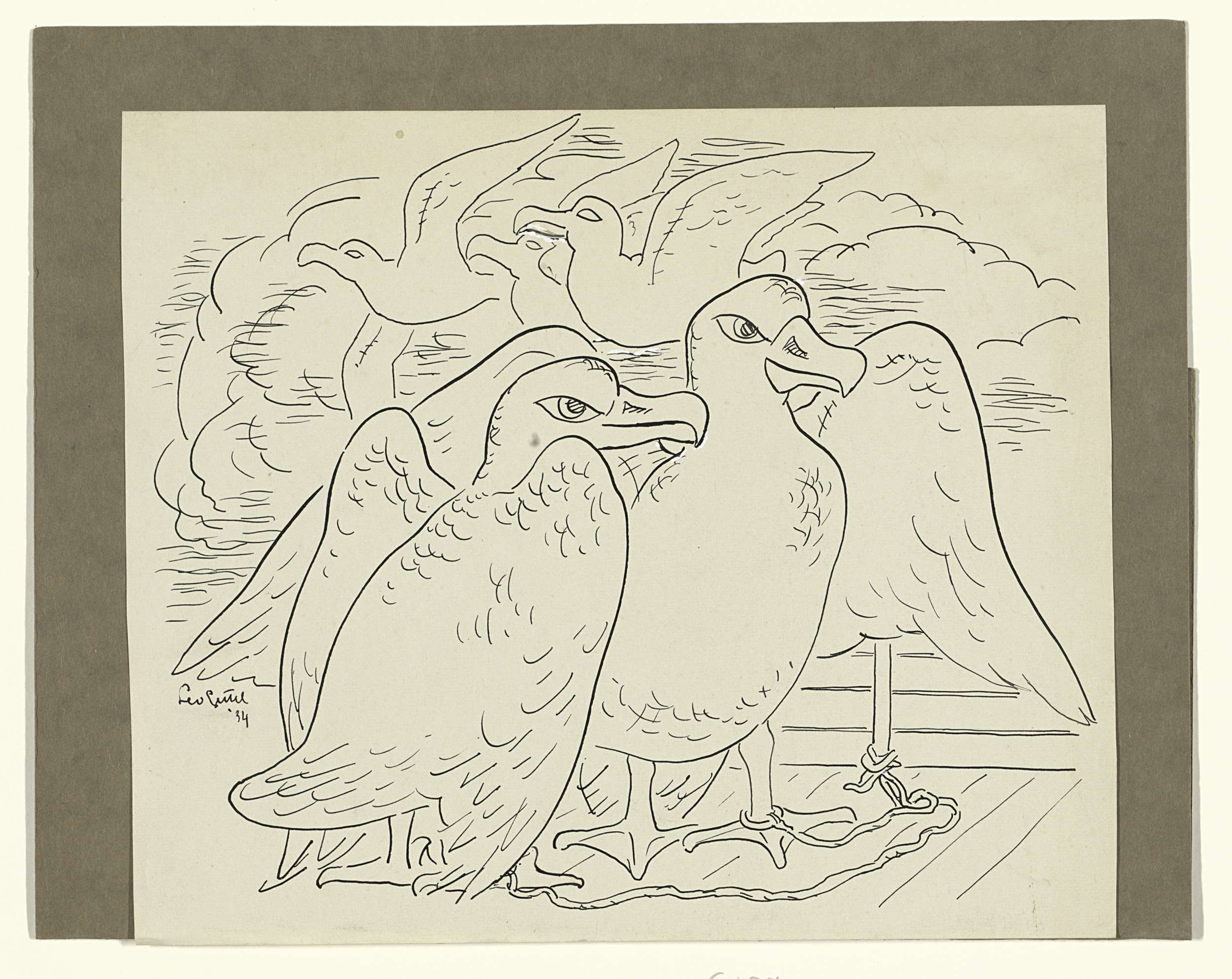
- Written: January 1841
- Country: France
- Language: French
- Subject(s): Albatross, seamen
- Form: 4 Quatrains
- Rhyme scheme: ABAB

L'Albatros (French for The Albatross) is a poem by decadent French poet Charles Baudelaire.

The poem, inspired by an incident on Baudelaire's trip to Bourbon Island in 1841, was begun in 1842 but not completed until 1859 with the addition of the final verse. It was first published in La Revue française in 1859, and was printed as the second poem in the second edition (1861) of Baudelaire's Les Fleurs du mal.

Italian writer, literary critic, and university professor Antonio Prete gave the poem a full treatment in his 1994 book L'albatros di Baudelaire.

The poem is recited by a young Roman Coppola in the "French Plantation" scene of Apocalypse Now Redux.

== Text ==
The poem is located in the section "Spleen et Idéal". It is built with four alexandrins quatrains with crossed rhymes (ABAB type), alternating feminine and masculine word endings.

French Text

Souvent, pour s’amuser, les hommes d’équipage
Prennent des albatros, vastes oiseaux des mers,
Qui suivent, indolents compagnons de voyage,
Le navire glissant sur les gouffres amers.

À peine les ont-ils déposés sur les planches,
Que ces rois de l'azur, maladroits et honteux,
Laissent piteusement leurs grandes ailes blanches
Comme des avirons traîner à côté d'eux.

Ce voyageur ailé, comme il est gauche et veule !
Lui, naguère si beau, qu'il est comique et laid !
L'un agace son bec avec un brûle-gueule,
L'autre mime, en boitant, l'infirme qui volait !

Le Poète est semblable au prince des nuées
Qui hante la tempête et se rit de l'archer;
Exilé sur le sol au milieu des huées,
Ses ailes de géant l'empêchent de marcher.

Literal translation

Often, to amuse themselves, the crewmen
Catch albatrosses, vast sea-birds,
Which follow, indolent companions of the voyage,
The ship gliding on the bitter gulfs.

Hardly have they put them on deck,
When these kings of the azure, clumsy and ashamed,
Pitifully let go their great white wings,
Like oars dragging alongside them.

This winged voyager, how awkward and weak he is!
He, once so beautiful, he's so funny and ugly!
One teases his beak with a pipestem,
Another mimes, limping, the cripple that once flew!

The Poet is like this prince of the clouds
Who haunts the tempest and laughs at the archer;
Exiled on the ground, in the midst of jeers,
His giant wings keep him from walking.

== Context ==
This poem was published in 1859 in La Revue française. Its origins are said to date back to 1841, during the sea voyage to the island of Bourbon (present-day Réunion) undertaken by Baudelaire, then aged 20. Unlike certain intellectuals who went to sea during the age of sailing ships (the American writers Richard Dana and Jack London; the English poet John Masefield), Baudelaire had not chosen this experience. It was his stepfather, General Aupick, who forced him into it, hoping to reform him from his misconduct.

Although he hated the experience and did not integrate with the crew, Baudelaire was nevertheless deeply marked by the voyage, which awakened in him a taste for exoticism.

To embody the poet, Baudelaire chose neither the noble golden eagle of the Romantics, nor the proud and solitary condor described by Leconte de Lisle. Instead, he chose a more painful symbol: the albatross represents the poet misunderstood by humanity, whose moral superiority separates him from society.

Albatross fishing was carried out using a line baited with a piece of meat, attached to an iron triangle floating on cork. The triangular shape of the fishing device even became the emblem of the association of former Cape Horn sailors.

Sailors at the time often regarded the albatross as a harmful bird. Indeed, it attacked people who had fallen overboard with its beak, and these victims generally could not be rescued.

The body of the albatross was used as raw material for making various objects. The skin of its feet was turned into tobacco pouches. Some of its bones were transformed into masts and yards for model ships. Mounted on a carved wooden albatross head, the beak formed the handle of a cane made from shark vertebrae threaded onto an iron rod, which the crew traditionally offered to their captain after a successful voyage.

== Analysis ==
Baudelaire uses the poem to address the treatment society imposes to the poet. A self-representational allegory, the captured bird, ridiculed and abused, embodies the misunderstood and rejected artist. The vertical division of space underscores the antagonism between two worlds: the heights where the idealistic poet soars on one hand, and a realm of narrow-minded, malicious humanity on the other. While the bird moves with ease through an "azure" of beauty, the ship must contend with "bitter gulfs." This stance of denunciation has established Baudelaire as one of the poètes maudits.

Some critics consider this otherwise celebrated poem to be unrepresentative of Baudelaire's genius. The parallel drawn between the mistreated bird and the humiliated poet strikes them as overly explicit. The assertion "The Poet is like this prince of the clouds" leaves no room for suggestion.
