= Asselineau =

Asselineau (French pronunciation: [asəlino]) is a French surname. Notable people with the surname include:

- Charles Asselineau (1820–1874), French writer
- François Asselineau (born 1957), French politician and civil servant
- Frédéric Asselineau (born 1965), French ice hockey player
- Léon Auguste Asselineau (1808–1889), French painter
