= Carlos Schwabe =

Swiss painter and printmaker

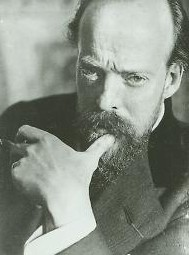
- Carlos Schwabe self portrait, circa 1900
- Born: Émile Martin Charles Schwabe; 21 July 1866; Altona, Kingdom of Prussia
- Died: 22 January 1926 (aged 59); Avon, France
- Movement: Symbolism

Carlos Schwabe (born Émile Martin Charles Schwabe; 21 July 1866 – 22 January 1926) was a Swiss Symbolist painter and printmaker.

== Life ==
Schwabe was born in Altona, Holstein into a merchant family. In 1870 his family moved to Switzerland, receiving Swiss citizenship in 1888. Between the years of 1882 to 1884, he studied at the École des arts industriels.

After studying art in Geneva, he relocated to Paris as a young man, where he worked as a wallpaper designer, and he became acquainted with Symbolist artists, musicians (Guillaume Lekeu, Vincent d'Indy) and writers. In 1892, he was one of the painters of the famous Salon de la Rose + Croix organized by Joséphin Péladan at the Galerie Durand-Ruel. His poster for the first Salon is an important symbolic work of idealist new art. He exhibited at the Société nationale des Beaux-Arts, at the Salon d'automne and was present at the Exposition Universelle of 1900, receiving the Gold medal. In the years that followed his work was also shown in Munich, Zürich, Vienna, and Brussels. Schwabe received the French Légion of Honor in 1902.

Schwabe's paintings typically featured mythological and allegorical themes, with a very personal and idealist vision and social interest. References to the artists Albrecht Dürer and Andrea Mantegna can be seen in Schwabe's work.

Schwabe is known for being one of the most important symbolist book illustrators. He illustrated the novel Le rêve (1892) by Émile Zola, Charles Baudelaire's Les Fleurs du mal (1900), Maurice Maeterlinck's Pelléas et Mélisande (1892), and Albert Samain's Jardin de l'infante (1908), but also texts by Haraucourt, Mallarmé, Blondel, Mendès, Lamennais, etc. His important work La Vague (The Wave) and its preparatory drawings are a testimony of the engagement of the artist during the Dreyfus affair.

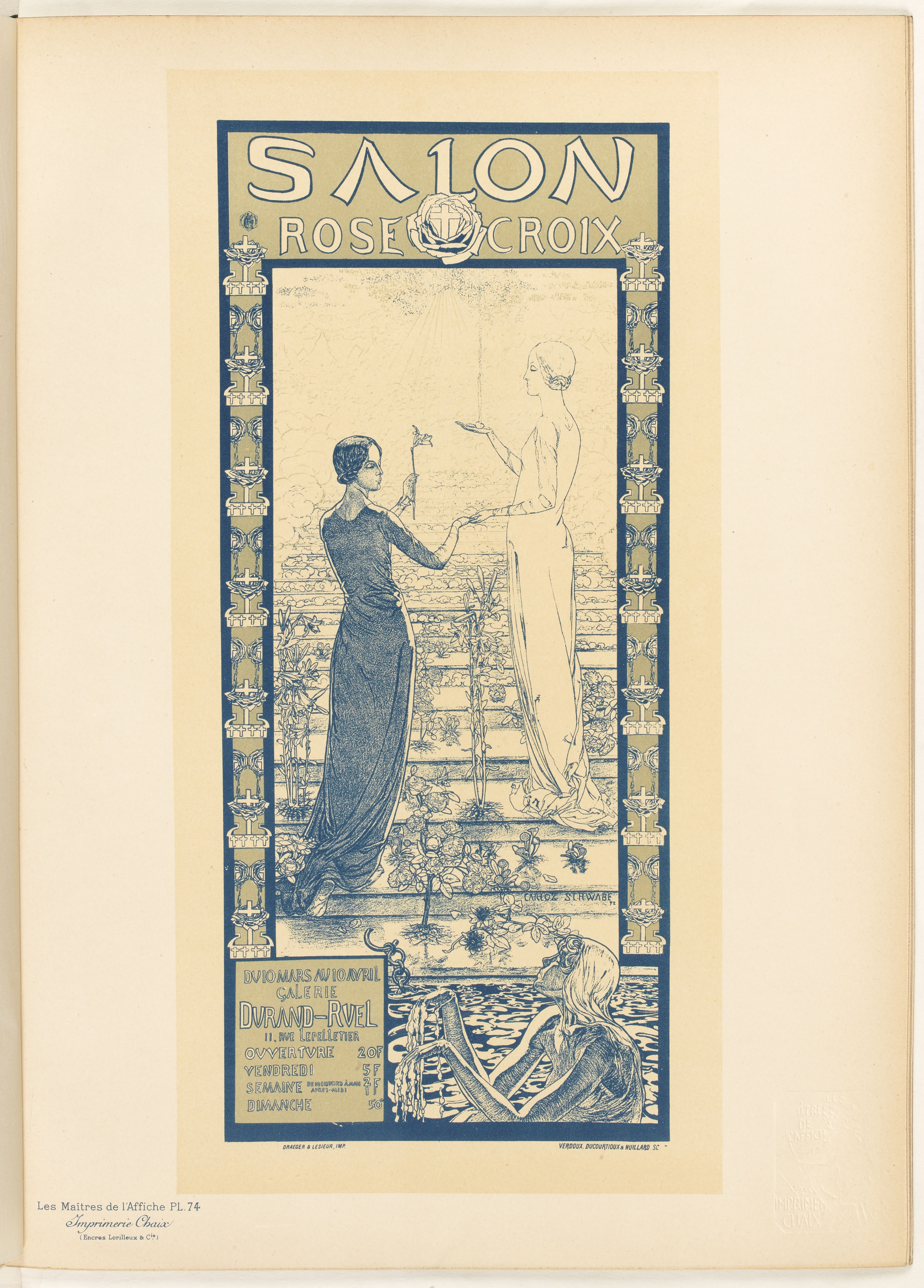
Salon de la Rose-Croix, 1892

The most important works by Schwabe belong to the Musée d'Orsay in Paris, the Musée d'Art et d'Histoire in Geneva, the Museu Nacional de Belas Artes in Rio de Janeiro, the Van Gogh Museum in Amsterdam, the Royal Museums of Fine Arts of Belgium in Brussels and in private collections.

Schwabe lived in France for the rest of his life and died in Avon, Seine-et-Marne in 1926.

== Work ==
Two distinct styles are recognized in Schwabe's art. Before 1900, Schwabe's paintings were more individual and experimental, indicating the idealism of the Symbolists; conventional, allegorical scenes from nature became more prominent in his later work. Images of women were important, sometimes representing death and suffering, other times creativity and guidance. His first wife was his model for angels and virgins, and "Death" in Death and the Grave Digger (1895) resembles her. The death of a close friend in 1894, the musician Guillaume Lekeu, when Schwabe was 28 years old, engendered his interest in representing death and the world of ideal creation.

Schwabe created an important watercolor that was the model of a lithographic poster for the 1892 Salon de la Rose + Croix, the first of six exhibitions organized by Joséphin Péladan that demonstrated the Rosicrucian tendencies of French Symbolism. Schwabe's poster depicted in shades of blue an initiation rite—three women ascending toward spiritual salvation—and is an exemplar of Rosicrucian art.

== Gallery ==
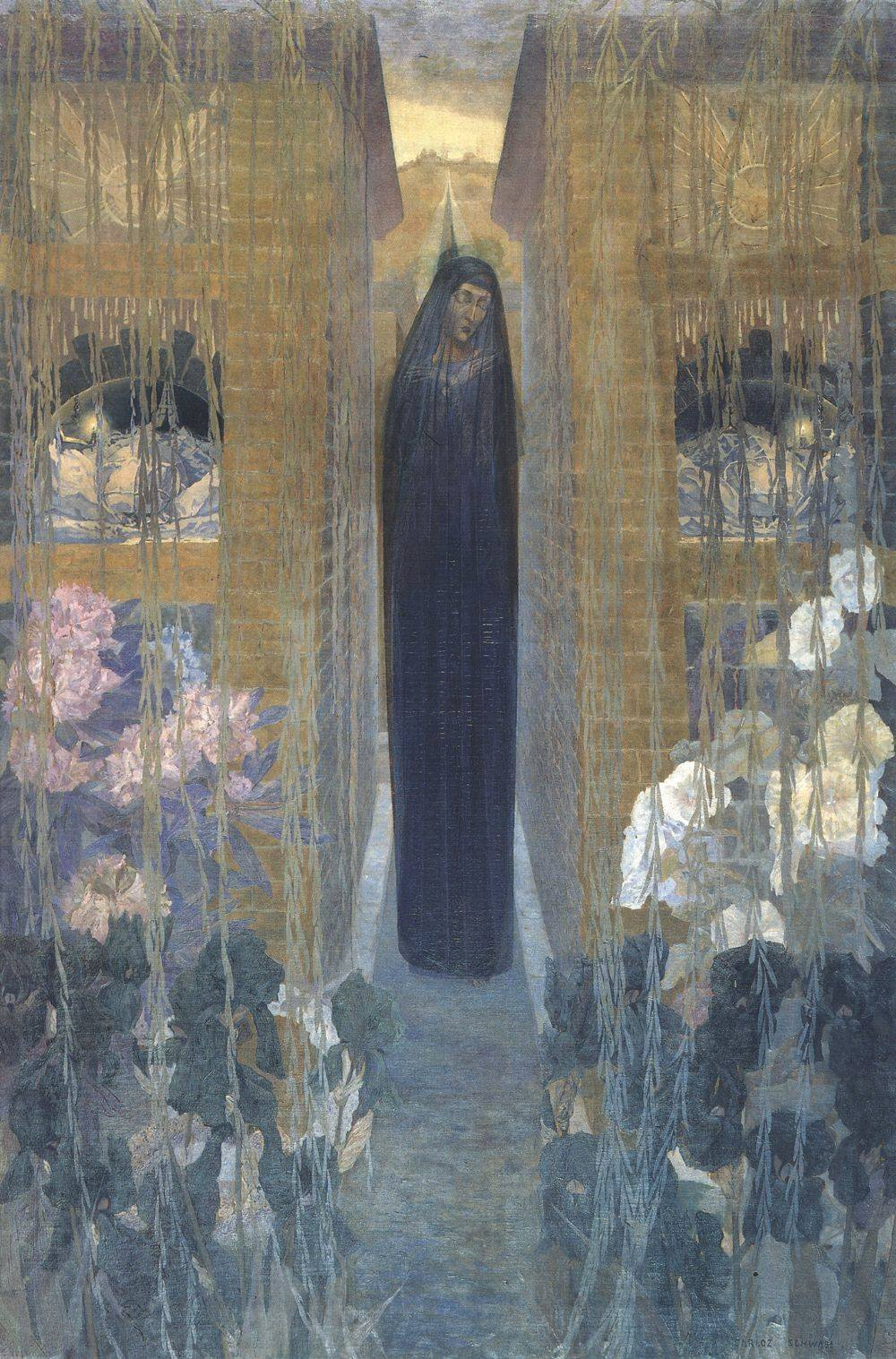
La douleur, 1893

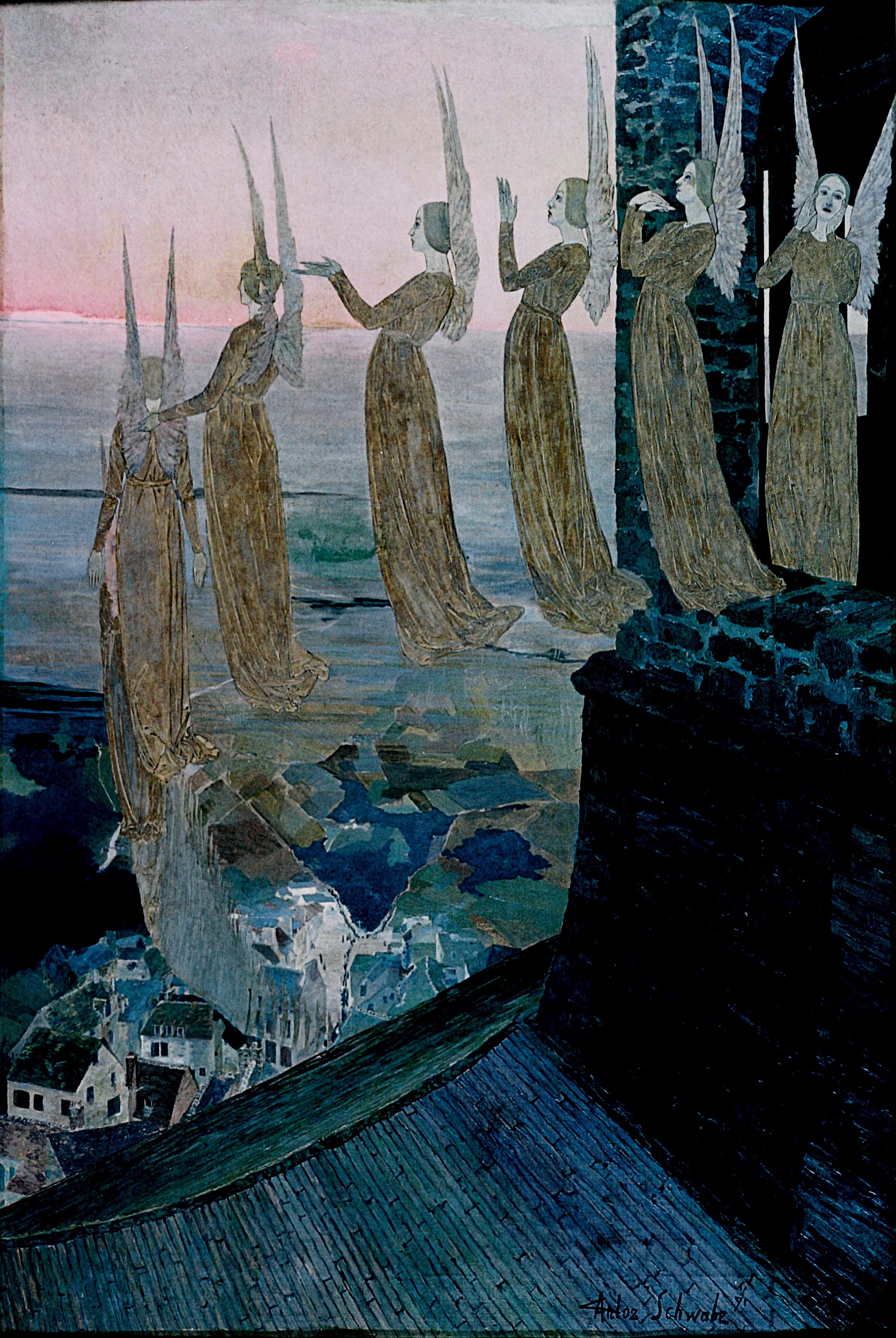
Cloches du soir (Evening bells, 1895)

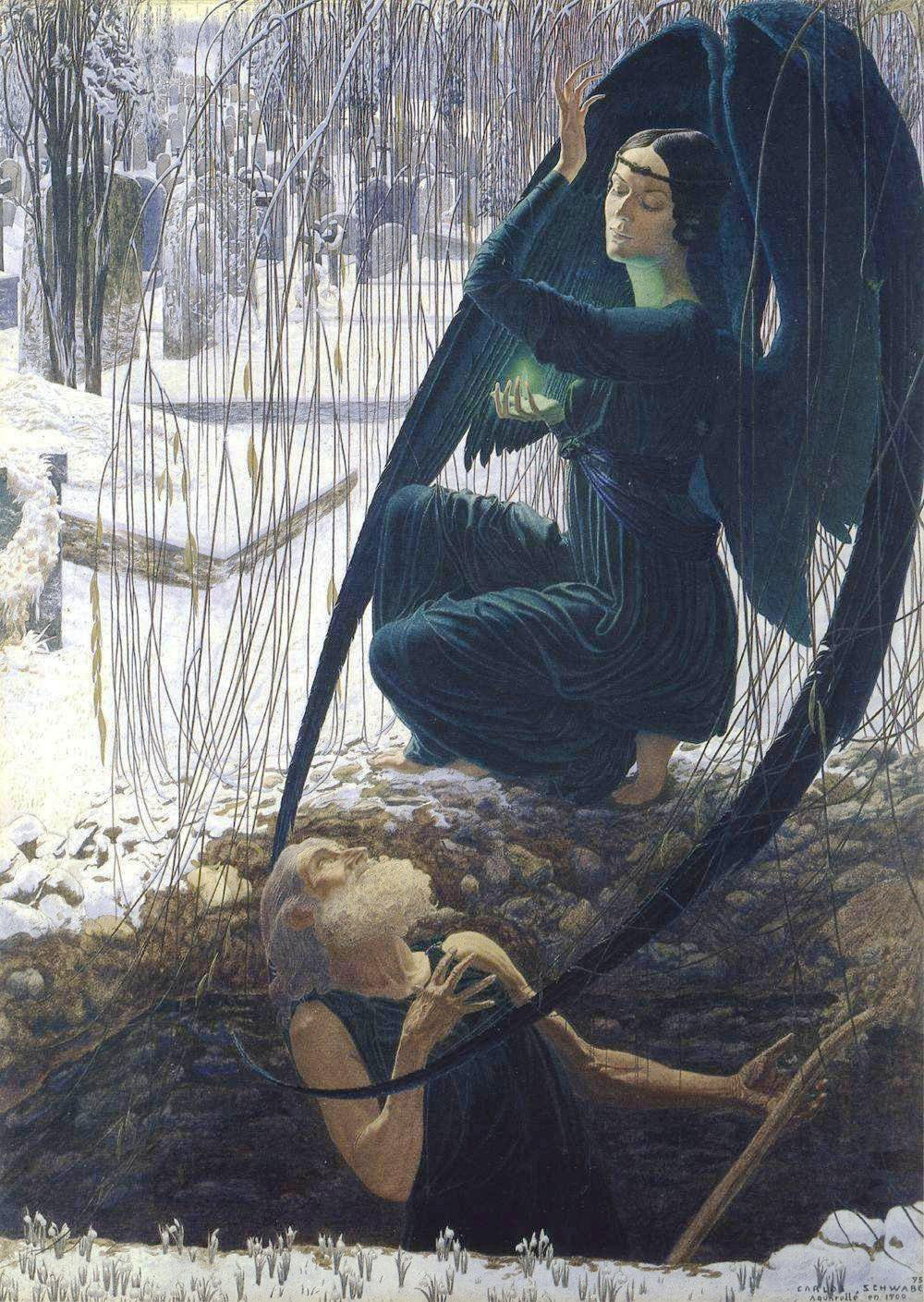
Death and the Gravedigger, 1895

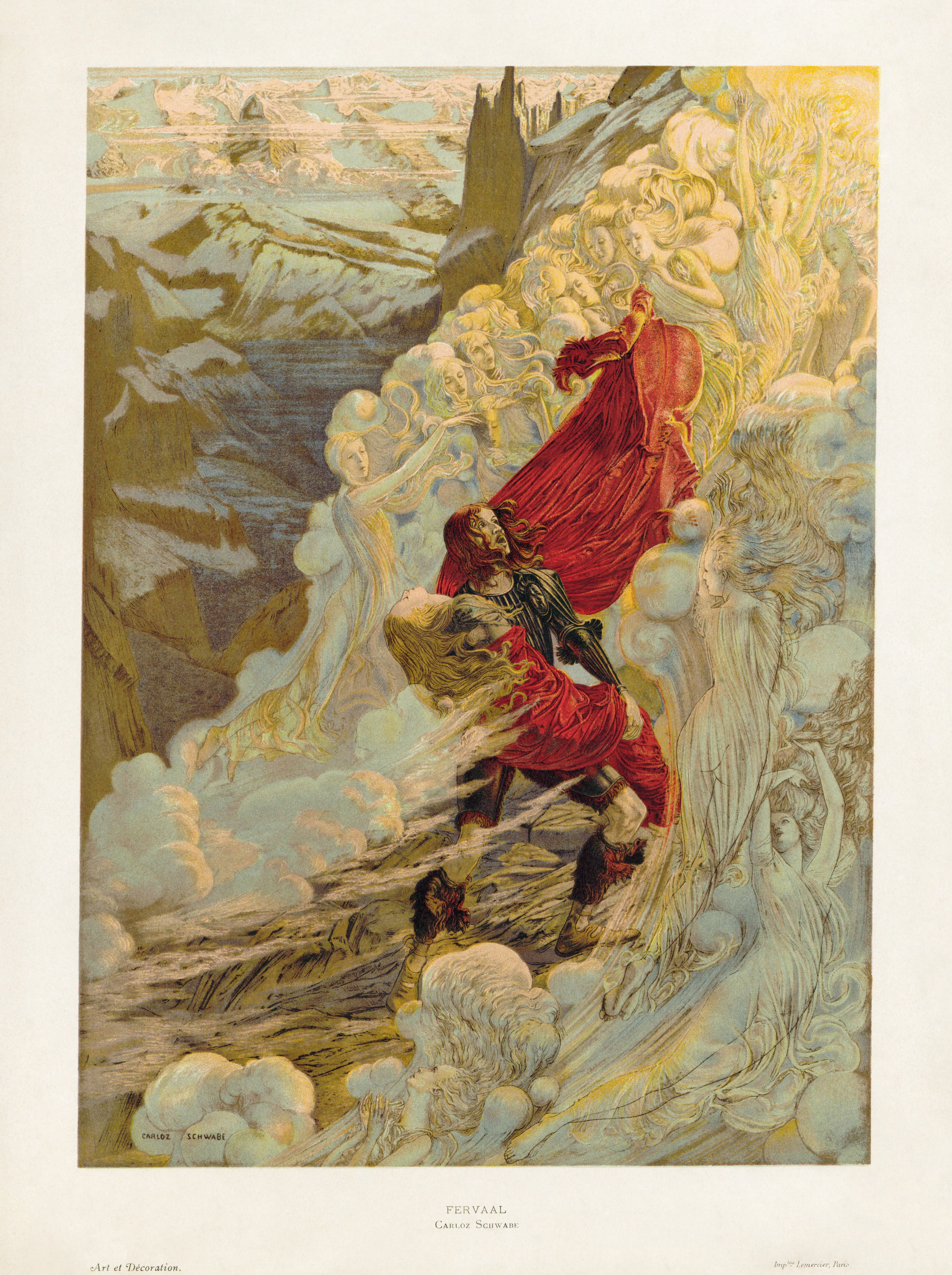
Fervaal, 1898

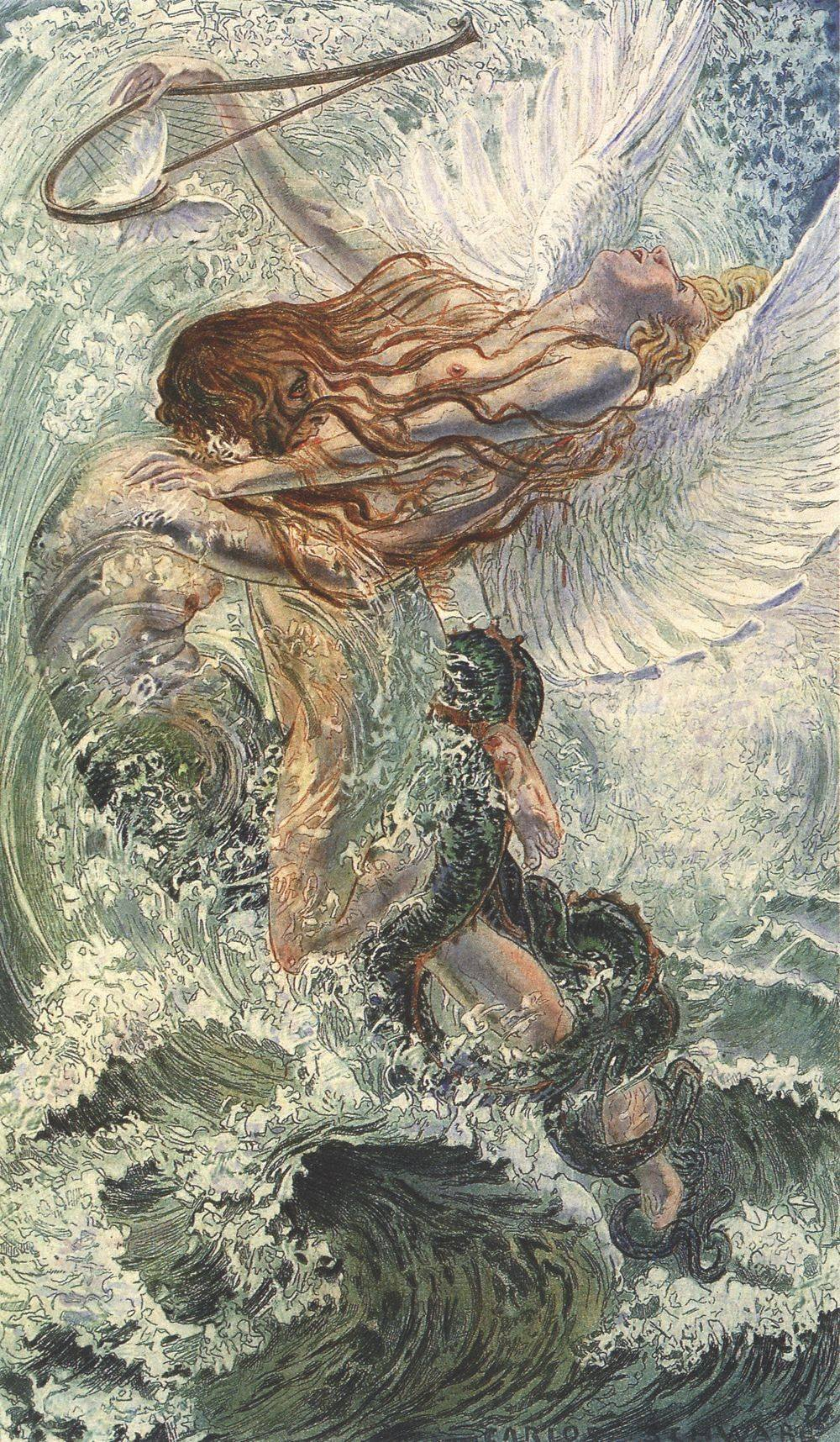
Les Fleurs du mal, 1900

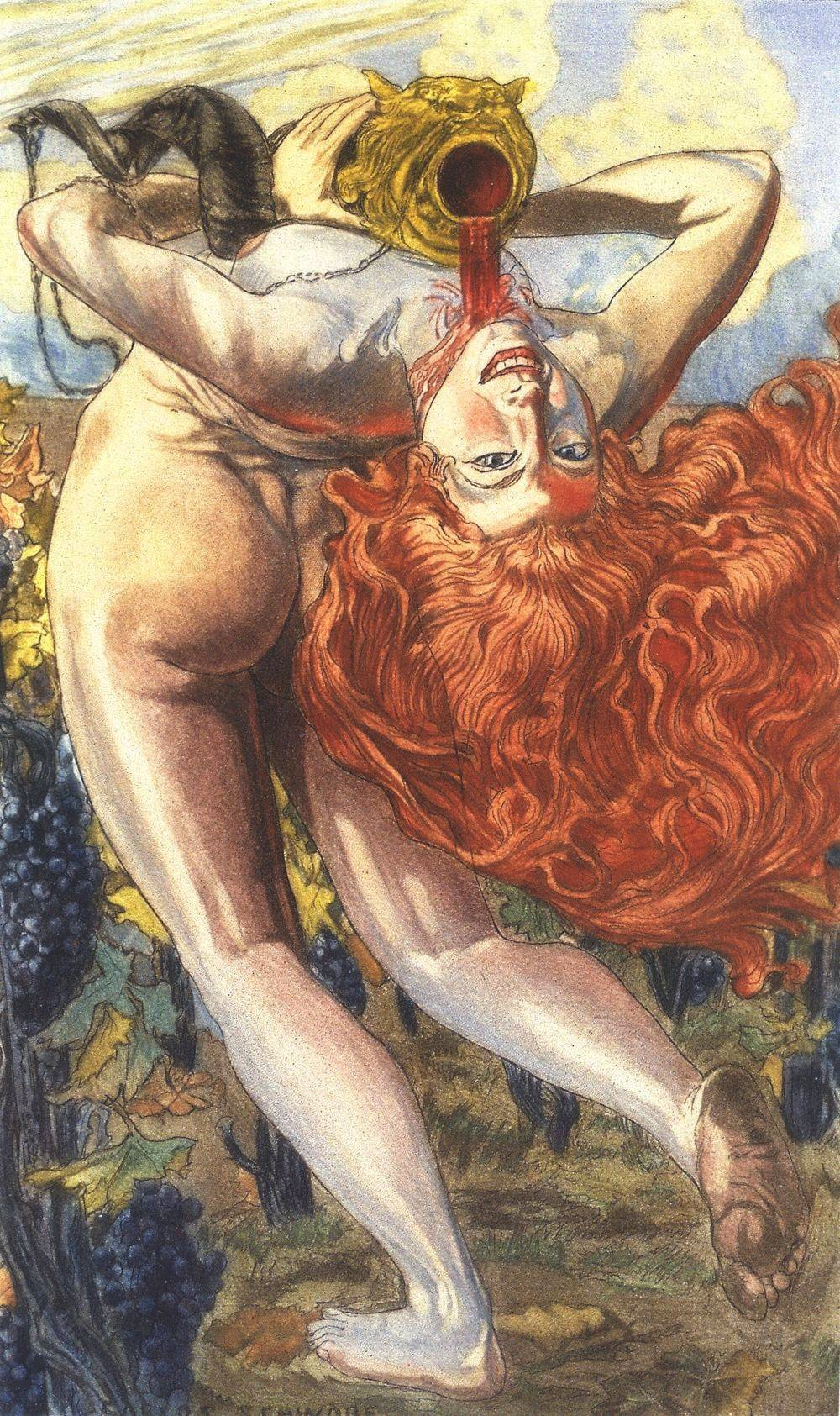
l'Ame du vin, 1900

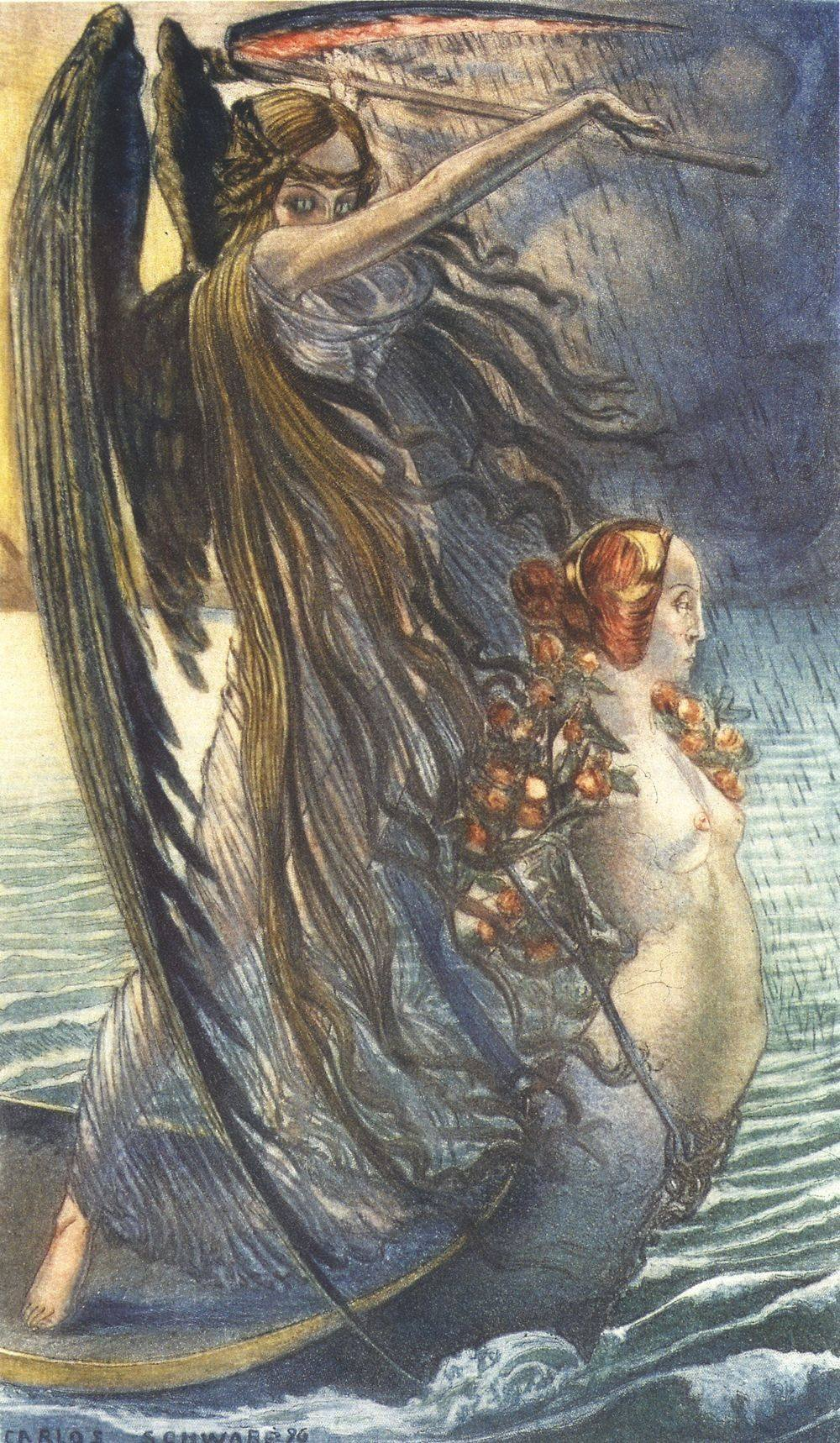
Colors of Evil, 1900

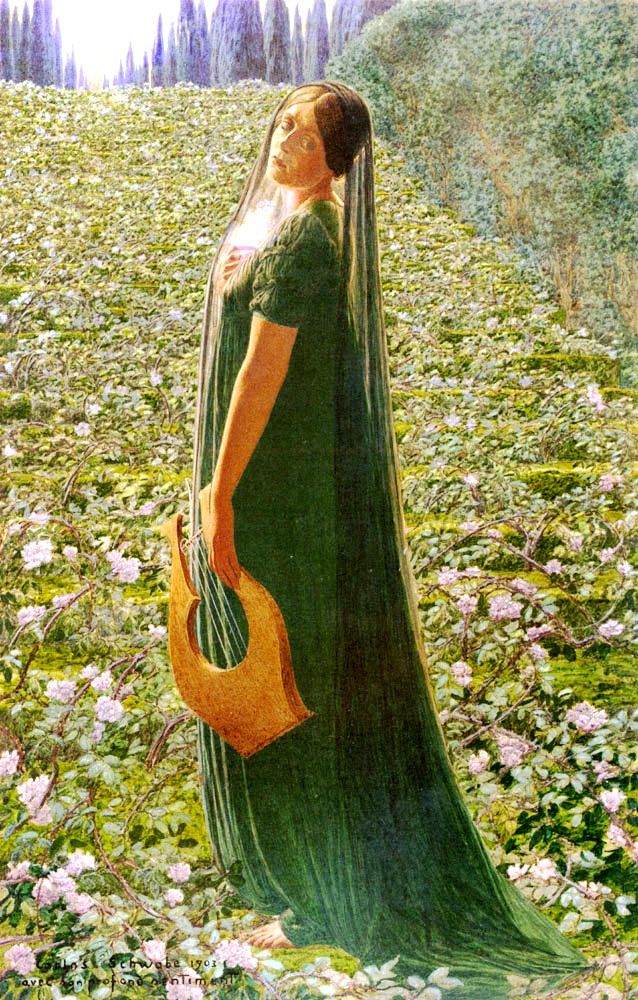
Elysian Fields, 1903

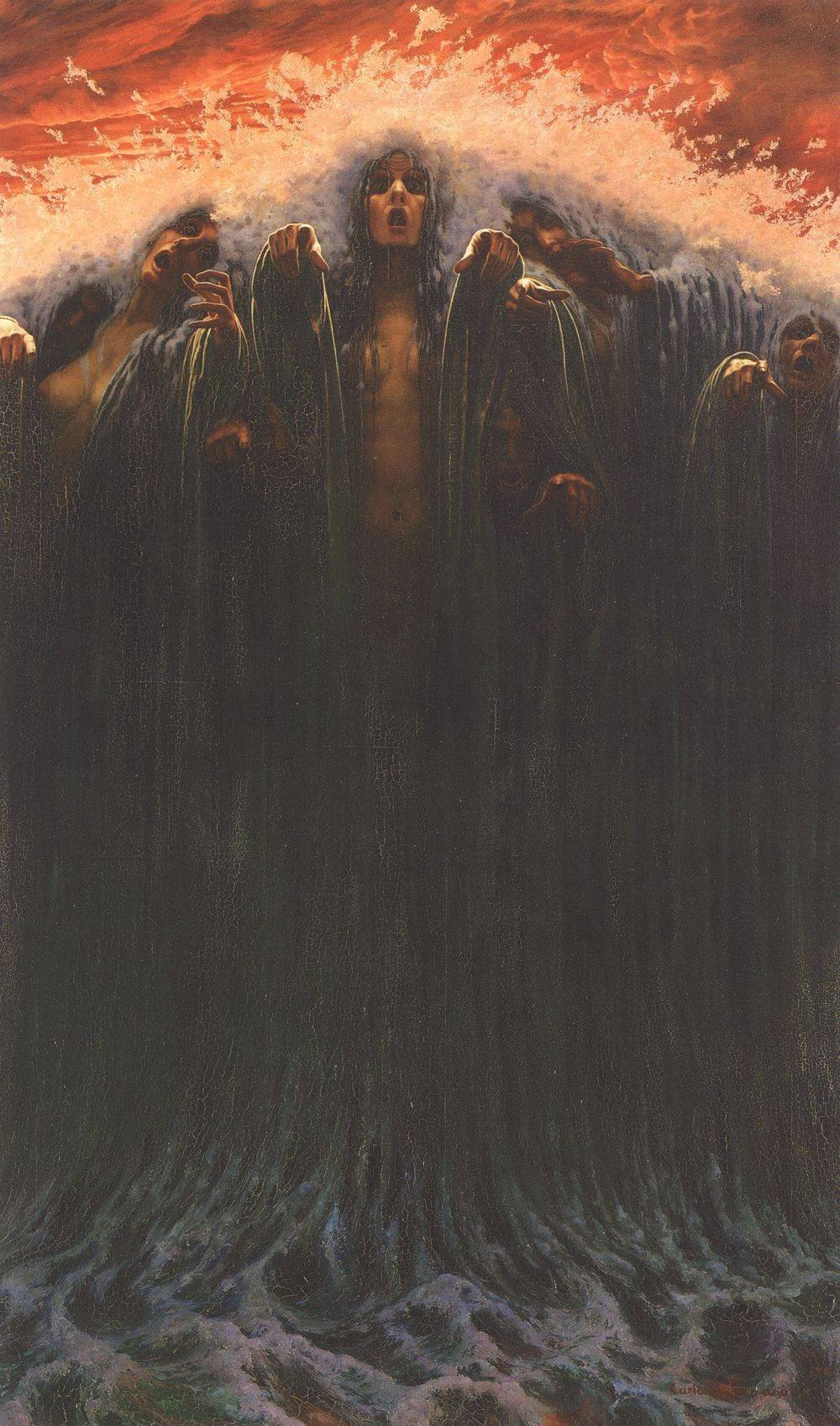
Wave, 1906

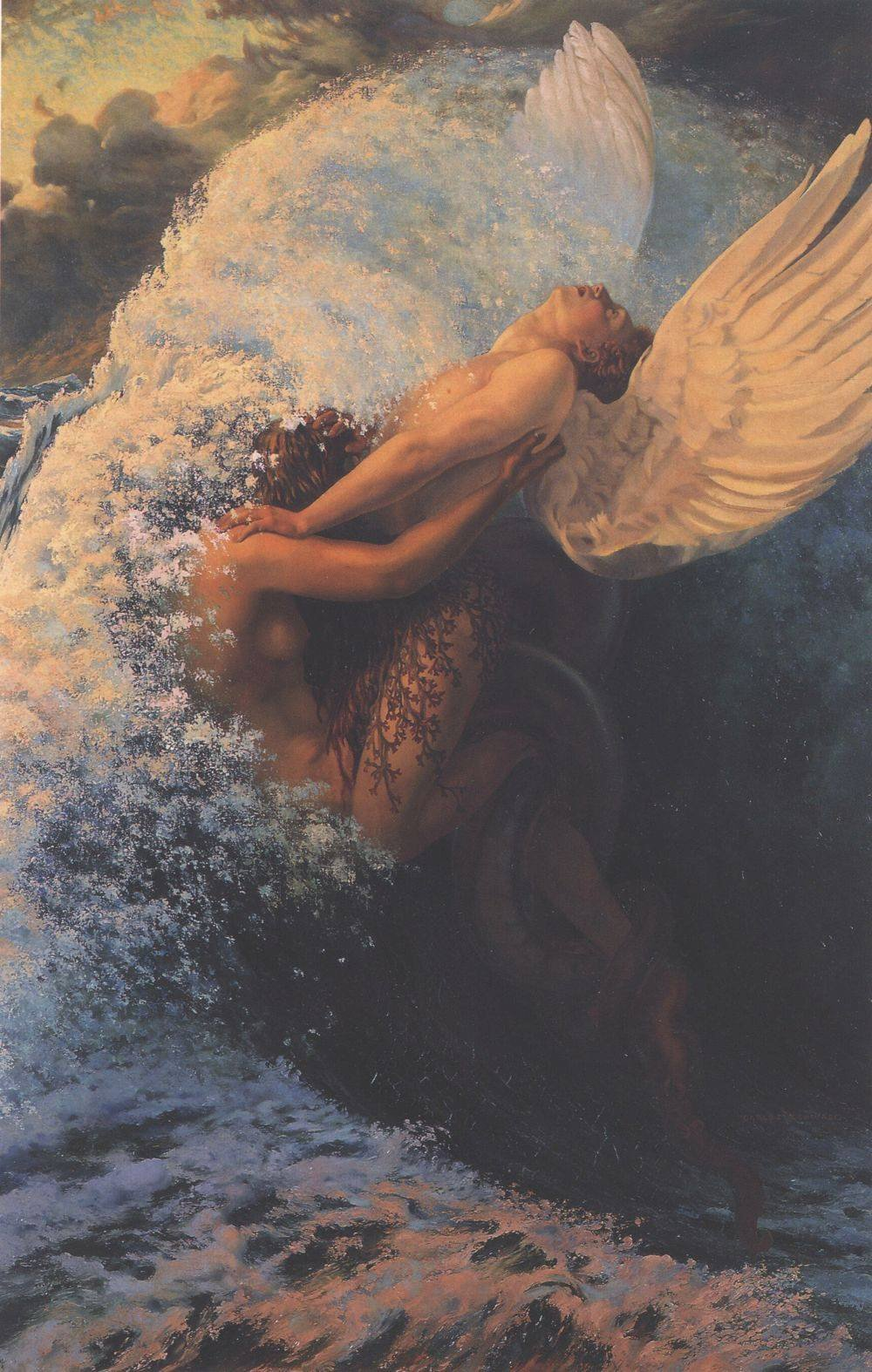
Spleen et Idéal, 1907

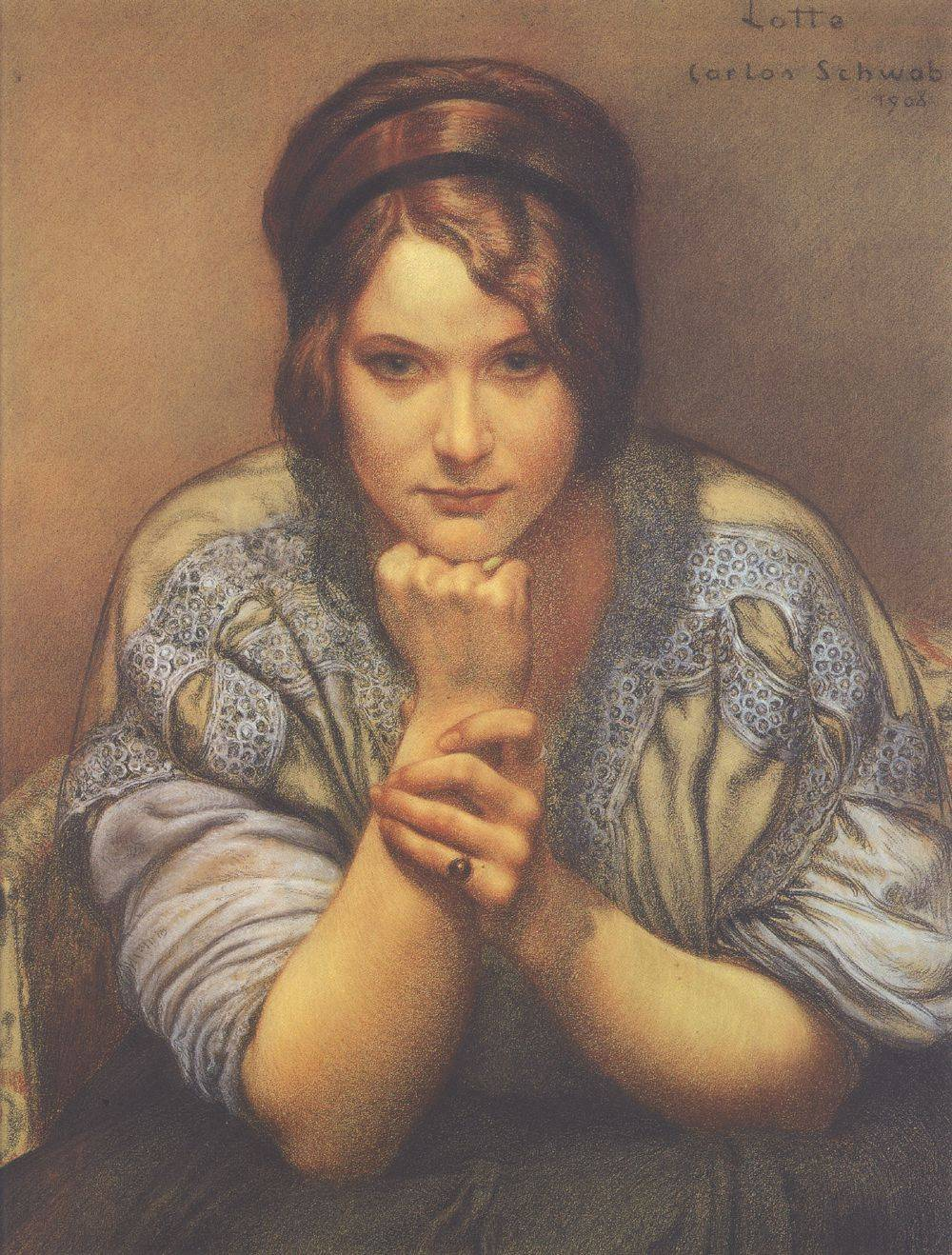
Lotte, the artist's daughter, 1908
