= The Swan (Baudelaire) =

Poem

Recording in French by Vincent Planchon for Audiocité.

Le Cygne (transl. The Swan) is a poem by Baudelaire published in the section "Tableaux Parisiens" (transl. Parisian scenes) of Les Fleurs du mal (transl. The Flowers of Evil).

== Situation ==
It is the fourth poem of the section "Tableaux Parisiens", and the first in a series of three poems dedicated to Victor Hugo. It is the second poem of the section named after one of its characters. The Swan is also the only poem of this section to feature a titular non-human protagonist.

== Form ==
It is made up of two parts: seven quatrains followed by six quatrains in alexandrines. Its crossed rhyme scheme alternates male and female endings.

== Study ==
=== The characters ===
==== Andromache ====
Andromache, married to Hector —a hero killed by Achilles during the Trojan War— after the fall of Troy becomes the captive of Pyrrhus (also called Neoptolemus), a son of Achilles, who has made her his concubine. Her son Astyanax was killed by the Greeks. Later she married Helenus, without ever forgetting Hector. Andromache symbolizes the desolate widow, the mourning mother. She is referred to in a number of works, in the Iliad, the Aeneid, or in Jean Racine‘s play Andromaque. Her portrayal in the poem is built upon oppositions and antitheses: bras d’un grand époux / tombeau vide (arms of a great husband / empty tomb), la main du superbe Pyrrhus / vil bétail (hand of the superbe Pyrrhus / vile cattle). She is also an allegory of the individual in exile .

==== The Swan ====
Pure and white, the swan symbolises metamorphosis. On earth it is ridiculous and out of its natural element, like the Albatros:the anti-hero applies equally (ridicule et sublime / ridiculous and sublime). Note the alliterations in [s], expression of a sigh, in the line Je pense à mon grand cygne, avec ses gestes fous (I think of my great swan with its mad gestures), and in [i] in the lines Comme les exilés, ridicule et sublime / Et rongé d’un désir sans trêve ! (Like exiles, ridiculous and sublime / And gnawed by incessant desire). The author also refers to the swan song as one among many symbols.

==== The negress ====
Her portrait is built on oppositions: the mud, the wall, the mist echoed the coconut tree and sublime Africa. The Negress is surely a reference to Jeanne Duval, the poet’s first mistress, a mixed race woman.

==== The orphans ====
These are an echo of the Roman She-Wolf, the Capitoline Wolf: they are compared to flowers and, like her, are withered and static.

==== The others ====
The poem opens and closes with an enumeration. At the same time, the characters are in no way specific: one can note the use of quiconque ("whomever".)

=== Conclusion ===
These beings are united in loss, and are figures, allegories of exile; they echo the exile of Victor Hugo, to whom the poem is dedicated (he left for the Channel Islands as a result of his opposition to Napoleon III). The poet chooses figures which are less and less sublime, becoming more and more commonplace, recalling once again the figure of the poet as alchemist. They are implicitly linked together and put on an equal footing— with Andromache becoming an animal (vil bétail / vile cattle), while the swan is humanized (avec ses gestes fous / with its mad gestures).

=== Reminiscence ===
The memory of the poet is fertilized by the Paris of the Grand Boulevards. The memory which sonne à plein souffle du cor (transl. sounds with the hunting horns) recalls the death of Roland in La Chanson de Roland, but is also expressed in the line mes chers souvenirs sont plus lourds que des rocs (my dear memories are heavier than rocks): the alliterations in [s] (expressive of breath) and in [r] (expressing heaviness) oppose one another, while cor and roc are a palindrome. Memory passes from plural to singular, from heaviness to lightness, from matter to music, from banality to value. The correspondences, allegories and images bring back to life those memories made static by spleen. One notes the semantic field of evil, as well as the anaphora Je pense...(I think...). The poet seems to be frozen in an inaccessible dream, and this is reinforced by the repetitions of the word jamais (never)— a word also given emphasis by an enjambment.

=== Structure ===
The poem is structured mirror-like, in the form of a chiasmus: we are taken from Andromache to the swan, and from the swan to Andromache. The many repetitions of souvenirs, superbe (sublime), vieux (old), maigre (lean) are also to be noted.

=== Paris changing ===
The poem is infused with the rhythm of Paris changing, recalling Hugo, to whom the poem is dedicated. One notes the opposition between two semantic fields: one of architecture expressing stability, the other one of mutation, with the nostalgia for a city turned upside down by the Hausmannian alterations.
