= Jacques Aupick =

French soldier and politician(1789–1857)

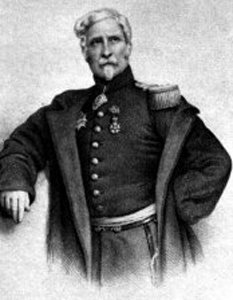
- Born: February 28, 1789
- Died: April 27, 1857 (aged 68)
- Resting place: Montparnasse Cemetery
- Spouse: Caroline Dufays

Jacques Aupick (28 February 1789 – 27 April 1857) was a French general and politician. He was the stepfather of the poet Charles Baudelaire.

== Biography ==
Aupick was the apparent son of a soldier of the Irish Brigade who was mortally wounded at Hondschoote in 1793. The orphaned child's original given name, James, was gallicized to Jacques. After his father's death, he was raised by Pierre Jean Baptiste Louis Baudart, a defrocked former curé of Gravelines. Aupick entered the Prytanée national militaire in 1802, and in 1808 went on to the École spéciale militaire de Saint-Cyr.

In March 1809, he was named second lieutenant of the 105th Infantry Regiment. He spent a brief time in Spain with the 105th, then in 1813 was transferred to the 145th Infantry where he ascended to the rank of capitaine adjudant-major. He fought at Lützen, Bautzen, Dresden and Leipzig, then in 1815 with the 46th Infantry at Fleurus, where he was hit in the knee by a cannonball. This injury would cause him periodic trouble for the rest of his life.

Upon the Second Restoration in 1815, he was put on half pay, but he was able to quickly reconcile himself to the change of regime. In 1817 he was made a major, and in 1818 was able to leverage his connections to be named aide-de-camp to the Prince de Hohenlohe.

On November 8, 1828, while posted to Lyon, he married Caroline Dufaÿs, widow of Joseph-François Baudelaire and mother of Charles Baudelaire (then aged 7), in Paris. Violent quarrels would break out between the future poet and his stepfather, who was little inclined to understand the child's sensibility. Dufaÿs was already pregnant at the time of wedding; the couple then traveled to Creil, so that Caroline's confinement could be made quiet; she gave birth to a stillborn daughter.

In 1830, Aupick was appointed staff officer at divisional headquarters in Algeria. There he distinguished himself and was promoted to lieutenant colonel. In 1831, after the July Revolution, he was appointed chief of the General Staff of the 7th Division at Lyon, and his family came to live with him there. His responsibilities in Lyon included monitoring strikes and quelling potential worker unrest.

Colonel Aupick participated in the repression of the workers' revolts of April 1834, and on May 12, 1839, in the repression of the insurrection organized in Paris by the Society of Seasons.

On August 2, 1839, he was named maréchal de camp. In 1847, he became commandant of the École polytechnique. In April 1848, he was sent as minister plenipotentiary to Constantinople, and in June 1851, was appointed as ambassador in Spain. He was considered a tactful and effective diplomat.

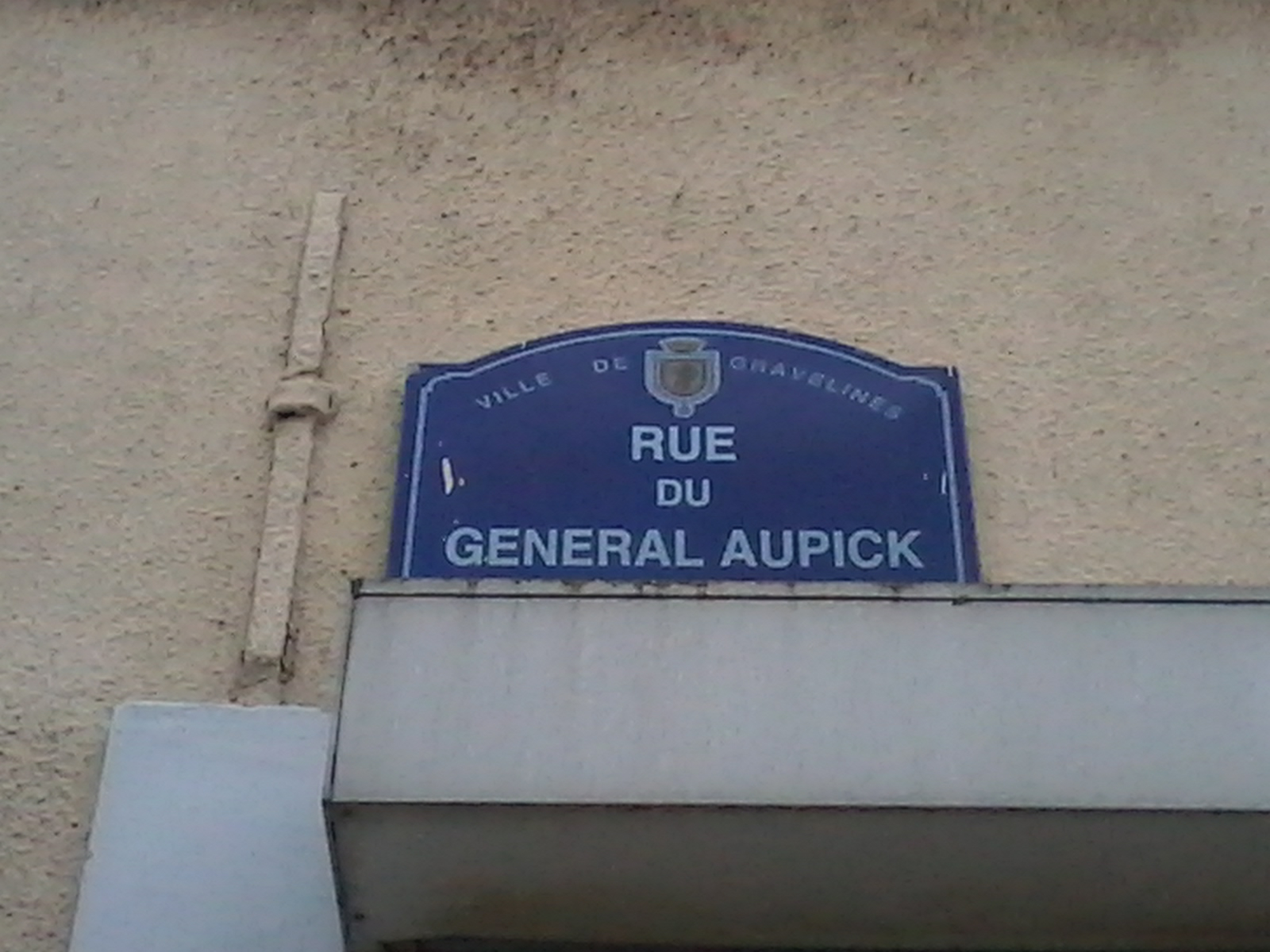
Rue du Général Aupick, Gravelines

In 1853, under the Second Empire, he demanded a leave of absence from his duties. He was named senator on March 8, 1853, then from 1855 Counselor General of the Canton of Gravelines, in the Nord department.

In 1855, he bought a house in Honfleur to which his widow would later retire.

Aupick died in Paris on April 27, 1857, a few weeks before the publication of Les Fleurs du mal.

== Relationship with Charles Baudelaire ==
Tension existed between Aupick and his stepson from very early in their relationship, but anecdotes like that of Nadar, who recounts that Baudelaire locked his mother in her bedroom to prevent her from consummating her marriage to Aupick, are universally agreed to be false. The young Baudelaire was often eager to please his stepfather and to hear his military reminiscences, and Aupick seems to have felt initial affection for Baudelaire as well; however, their relationship soured in the early years as Aupick tried to instill a sense of duty in a child whose penchants towards extravagance and idleness were early very pronounced.

It is difficult to say how much of Baudelaire's accounts of childhood strife with his stepfather was projected retrospectively from the very real hatred he had come to feel for the General, but it is certain that Aupick was an unwelcome interloper in the young Charles' "period of passionate love" for his widowed mother. At the age of 10, Baudelaire was sent to a boarding school in Lyon. He would later recall having been miserable there, but recollections by former schoolmates tend to contradict this notion. The letters written home by Baudelaire as a teenager contain many phrases of tenderness towards his stepfather.

Baudelaire's rebelliousness, intensifying with the onset of puberty, resulted in his expulsion at the age of eighteen from the Lycée Louis-le-Grand, a prestigious school to which he had been able to gain admittance through the intervention of his stepfather. Aupick offered to use his connections to find Baudelaire a career, but Charles refused, making clear to his stepfather that he would be a poet and nothing else. It was at this time also that Aupick became aware of Charles' frequent relations with prostitutes.

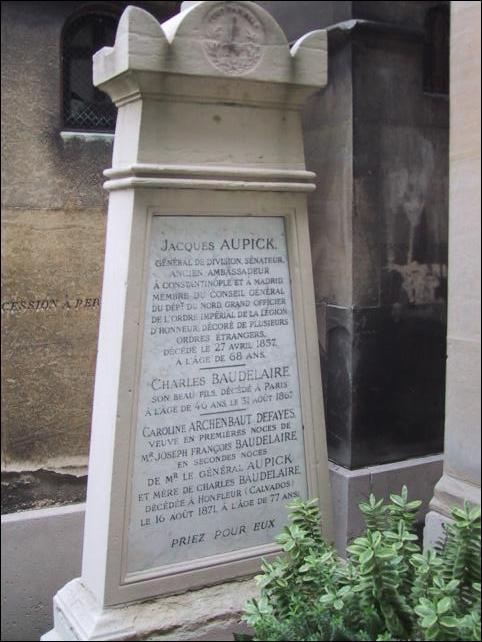
Tomb of Aupick and Baudelaire in Montparnasse Cemetery

To remove Baudelaire from bad influences, Aupick and Caroline decided to send him abroad. Aupick loved the sea, having been born in a seaport, and thought that a sea-voyage to India would be most beneficial to Charles. The funds for this voyage were gained from a partial mortgage of Baudelaire's property; this deal was contracted without his knowledge, the property being held in trust until he reached the age of majority: disputes over the control of this legacy would go on to be one of the primary sources of conflict between Baudelaire and Aupick. Baudelaire returned early aboard a different ship, after the ship he had been sent out on, which was nearly wrecked in a storm, put in for repairs at Mauritius.

Baudelaire came into his inheritance in 1842, but immediately began spending it recklessly. Through Aupick's intervention, this money was put into the hands of a judicial counselor named Ancelle, with Baudelaire receiving only the monthly interest. Baudelaire felt deep shame at being relegated to the status of permanent minor, and his relations with his stepfather became only more embittered in the ensuing years. A historical anecdote, which has formed an important part of the legend of Baudelaire's and Aupick's enmity, has Baudelaire on the barricades in 1848 yelling, "Il faut tuer le Général Aupick!" (General Aupick must be killed!). This story is ascribed by Baudelaire's friend and first biographer, Charles Asselineau, to another friend of the poet, Jules Buisson.

In his study on Baudelaire, Jean-Paul Sartre writes: "The role of the General was prime in the process of self-punishment ... and it is also true that the terrible Aupick seems to have incarnated himself in the mother of the poet ... After the death of her husband, she takes up, despite herself, his crushing role of law-enforcer."
