= Bénédiction =

Poem by Charles Baudelaire

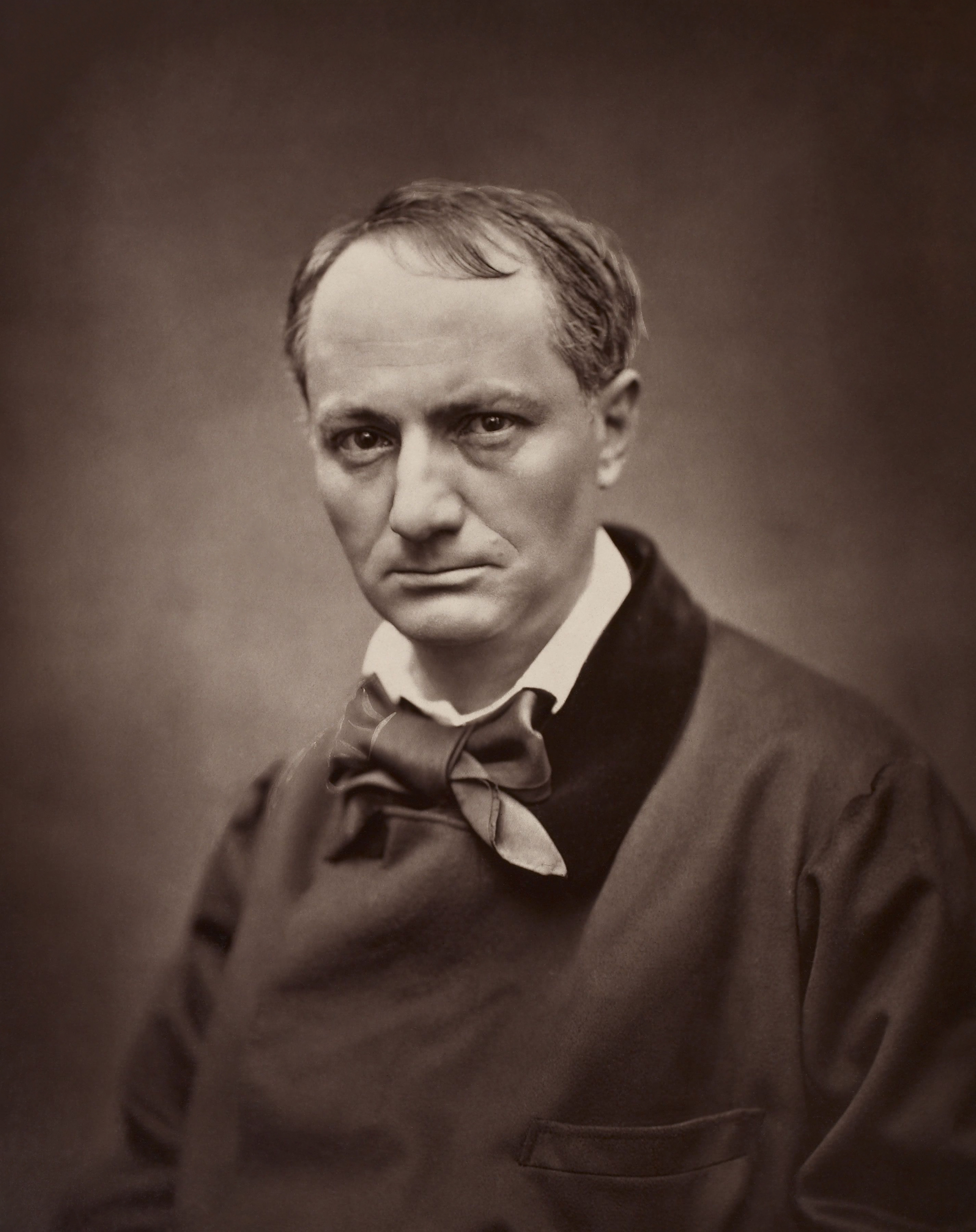
Charles Baudelaire by Étienne Carjat

Bénédiction (English: Benediction) is the second poem in Charles Baudelaire's 1857 poetry collection Les Fleurs du mal, after the introductory poem Au Lecteur ("To the Reader"). Bénédiction is also the first numbered poem. It describes the birth of the Poet amid his mother's rage, then his childhood experiences of beauty and the faith he places, despite his mother's curse and the contempt of all the world, in a destiny being prepared for him by God.

== Content ==
When the poet is sent by a "decree of the supreme powers" to be born on earth, the Poet's mother curses God, declaring that she would rather have given birth to "a whole knot of vipers." Because it is outside her power to discard the infant, she swears she will deform and stunt it until it "cannot put out its blighted buds." However, under the "invisible tutelage" of an Angel, the child grows, innocent and happy, while "all those he wants to love" despise and ostracize him. The Poet's wife shouts "in the public squares" that she will strive to usurp God in his heart, and that when she becomes bored with him she will tear out his heart and "throw it with disdain to satiate her favorite beast." Despite all this hardship, the Poet "lifts his pious arms toward the sky" and praises God for all the suffering he endures, knowing that "pain is the only nobility" and that a dazzling crown is being woven for him in heaven:

Mais les bijoux perdus de l’antique Palmyre,
Les métaux inconnus, les perles de la mer,
Par votre main montés, ne pourraient pas suffire
A ce beau diadème éblouissant et clair;

Car il ne sera fait que de pure lumière,
Puisée au foyer saint des rayons primitifs,
Et dont les yeux mortels, dans leur splendeur entière,
ne sont que des miroirs obscurcis et plaintifs !

Translation:

But the lost jewels of old Palmyra,
The unknown metals, the pearls of the sea,
Mounted by your hand, could not suffice
To this lovely, bright and dazzling diadem.

For it will be made only of pure light
Drawn from the sacred hearth of primitive rays,
And of which mortal eyes, in all their splendor,
Are only tarnished and plaintive mirrors!

== Analysis ==
The poem is 19 quatrains of alexandrines with an ABAB rhyme scheme (rimes croisées). Twelve of these stanzas are spoken by the poet's mother, the poet's wife, or the poet himself; the other seven are in the third person.

Bénédiction is often read in conjunction with Correspondances and Élévation, two of the three poems which follow, as the first episode in a mystical progress of the Poet towards a lost paradise, dimly remembered through poetic inspiration. The "monde ennuyé" ("bored world") of the first line has further rapport with Au Lecteur, where Ennui is personified as the "ugliest, filthiest, most wicked vice," who "dreams of the scaffold while smoking his hookah."

Baudelaire's feelings towards his own mother, Caroline, were intense and ambivalent. His early life he described, with intense nostalgia, as an "innocent paradise" characterized by "a period of passionate love" for his mother. Though they remained close throughout his life, Baudelaire's debts and his Bohemian lifestyle, particularly his relationship with Jeanne Duval, caused their relationship to become tense. The epithet "maternal," for Baudelaire, often represents something petty and animalistic, as in his correspondence where he describes credit as "this maternal invention of a mind too preoccupied with money!"

The first lines of the poem have been interpreted as a perverse recasting of the Annunciation, where there is no mystery for the mother surrounding the conception of the child ("Cursed be the night of ephemeral pleasures..."), and where no permission is asked by the Holy Spirit.

The poem contributes to the problem of theodicy through its attribution of redemptive power to the Poet's suffering. Some studies have examined the element of fate.

Critical estimation of Bénédiction suffered in the twentieth century, where Baudelaire's later realist poetics were upheld at the expense of poems representative of his Romantic mode, of which this provides one of the most exaggerated examples. Wallace Stevens considered it the weakest poem in the collection because of its stilted style and self-conscious poeticality. Literary theorist Leo Bersani characterized it as one of "Baudelaire's most famous, and least interesting, poems."
