= Les Sept Vieillards =

1857 poem by Charles Baudelaire

Les Sept Vieillards ("The Seven Old Men") is a poem by the French poet Charles Baudelaire, the fifth poem in the Tableaux parisiens ("Parisian Scenes") section of his 1857 poetry collection Les Fleurs du mal, and the ninetieth numbered poem of the collection as a whole. It deals with an encounter in a Paris street between the speaker and seven identical old men.

== Summary and analysis ==
The poem opens with a description of the city as a place of somber mystery: "Teeming city, city full of dreams / Where ghosts in broad daylight accost the passers-by." The speaker is walking down the street in a pensive, splenetic mood ("Arguing with my already-weary soul") when he is shocked and engrossed by an old man who he sees passing by. He describes this old man's appearance at length, noting his simultaneously abject and wicked air. Then the old man seems to multiply, with first one, then six identical old men following him in quick succession. The speaker feels violated and disturbed by this apparition, asking: "Of what infamous plot was I then the target, / Or what wicked chance thus humiliated me? / For I counted seven times, from minute to minute, / This sinister old man who multiplied himself." The speaker goes home with his sanity disturbed: "Vainly my reason tried to take control; The tempest playing frustrated its efforts, / And my soul danced, danced, like an old mastless barge, / On a monstrous, shoreless sea."

In The Culture of Yellow: or The Visual Politics of Late Modernity, Sabine Doran notes the recurrence of the color yellow in the poem, which is the color of the old man's rags and the city fog, as well as in the gall, or "yellow bile," in which the speaker says the old man's eyes seem drenched. Yellow has been considered as the color of stigma (as in the badges Jews were forced to wear, in the Middle Ages and Nazi Germany), as well as the color of hostility ("yellow bile" being associated with the choleric humor in humoral medicine). Doran writes: "The poet is subjected to the multiplication of the “sinister old men” and their “wickedness” on his voyage through the city, which is presented in its yellow atmosphere as a kind of hell; and yet, Baudelaire transforms this atmosphere of disgust, bitterness, and anger into an idyllic moment, a moment of an eternal beauty, activating the vision of an artificial paradise. However, the moment of reversal creates the intensity of a discontinuous moment, not a moment of fulfillment, but rather the experience of a rupture, the sudden experience of an irretrievable loss."

The poem deals with the modernization of the city and the sense of placelessness and disorientation it entails. The everyday subject matter of the poem, as well as its break with tradition in addressing neither an individual nor a community, but the city as an arbitrary collection of people, has been seen as anticipating Le Spleen de Paris.

== Literature and popular culture ==
Annotating lines 60-63 of his 1922 poem The Waste Land ("Unreal City, / Under the brown fog of a winter dawn, / A crowd flowed over London Bridge, so many, / I had not thought death had undone so many."), T.S. Eliot writes: "Cf. Baudelaire: 'Fourmillante cité, cité pleine de rêves, / Où le spectre en plein jour raccroche le passant.'," quoting the first two lines of Les Sept Vieillards.
