= Les Fleurs du mal =

Volume of poetry by Charles Baudelaire

The Flowers of Evil
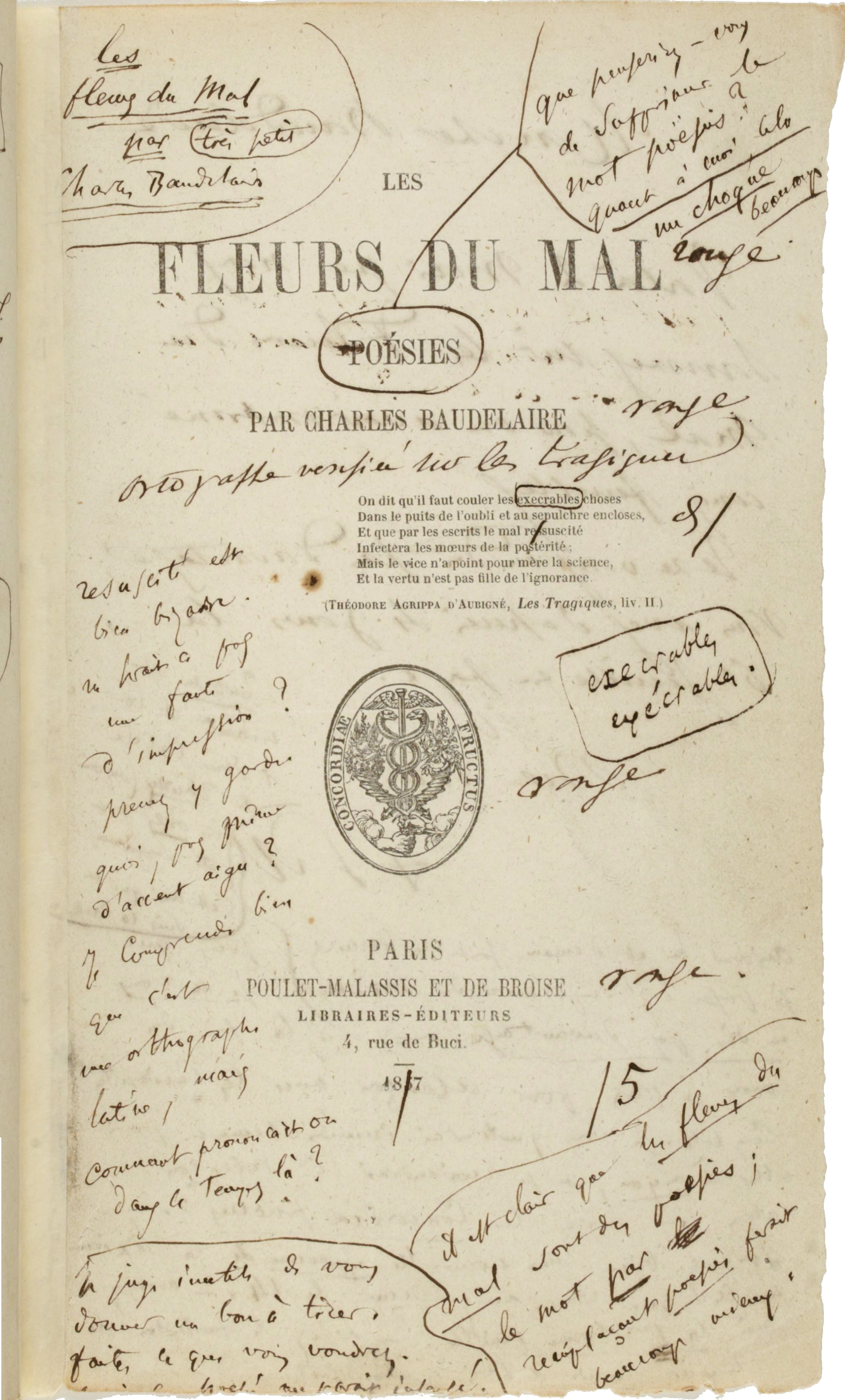
- The first edition of Les Fleurs du mal with author's notes
- Author: Charles Baudelaire
- Original title: Les Fleurs du mal
- Translator: George Dillion, Edna St. Vincent Millay, Jacques Leclercq, Stefan George, William F. Aggeler
- Illustrator: Carlos Schwabe
- Language: French
- Genre: Lyric poetry
- Published: 1857
- Publisher: Auguste Poulet-Malassis
- Publication place: France
- Media type: Print
- OCLC: 2294734
- Dewey Decimal: 841.8
- LC Class: PQ2191 .F6
- Original text: Les Fleurs du mal at French Wikisource
- Translation: The Flowers of Evil at Wikisource

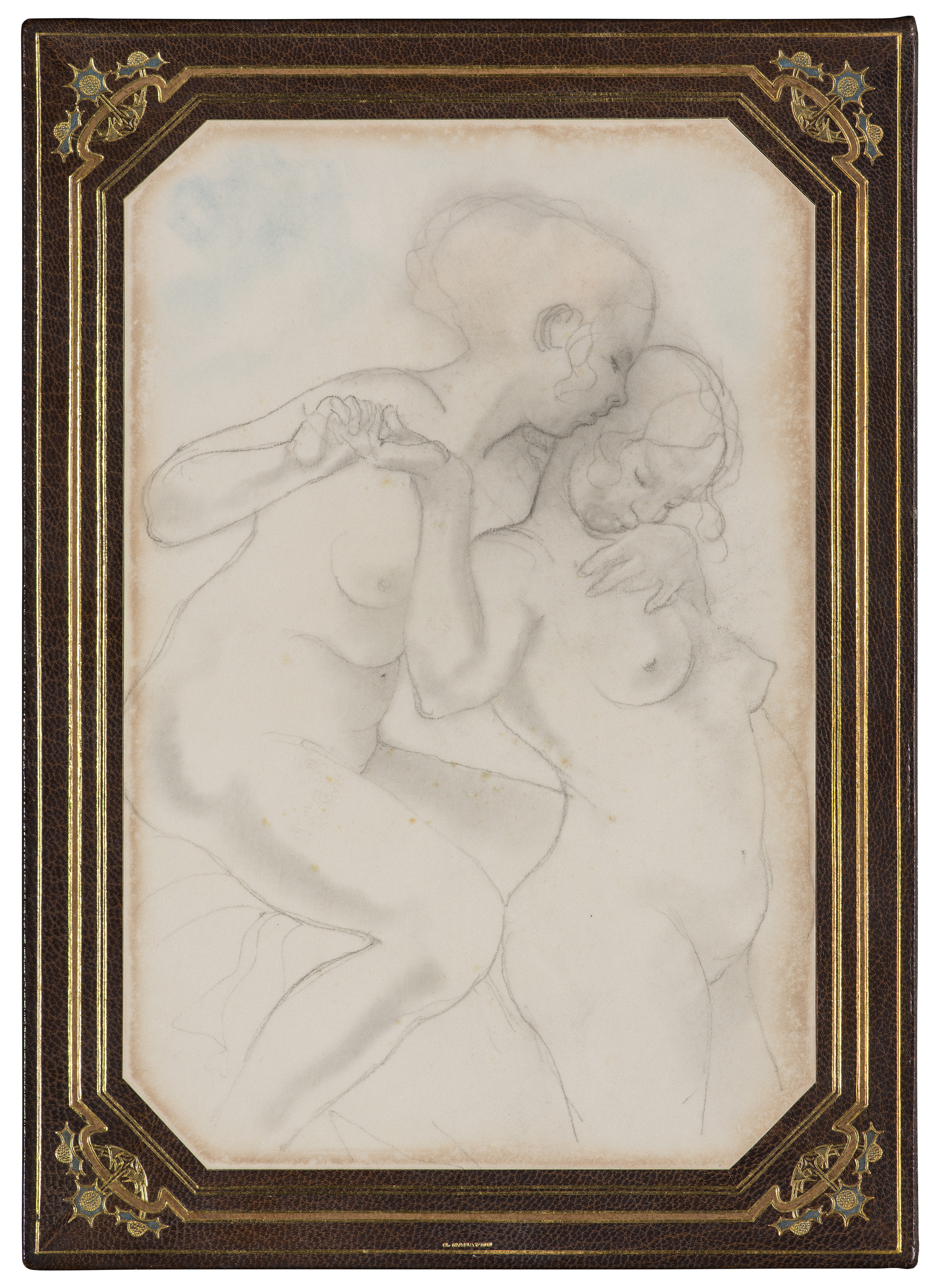
Illustration by Armand Rassenfosse for Les Fleurs du Mal. Collection King Baudouin Foundation.

Les Fleurs du mal (French pronunciation: [le flœʁ dy mal]; English: The Flowers of Evil) is a volume of French poetry by Charles Baudelaire.

Les Fleurs du mal includes nearly all of Baudelaire's poetry, written from 1840 until his death in August 1867. First published in 1857, it was important in the symbolist—including painting—and modernist movements. Though it was extremely controversial upon publication, with six of its poems censored due to their immorality, it is now considered a major work of French poetry. The poems in Les Fleurs du mal frequently break with tradition, using suggestive images and unusual forms. They deal with themes relating to decadence and eroticism, particularly focusing on suffering and its relationship to original sin, disgust toward evil and oneself, obsession with death, and aspiration toward an ideal world. Les Fleurs du mal had a powerful influence on several notable French poets, including Paul Verlaine, Arthur Rimbaud, and Stéphane Mallarmé.

== Overview ==
The initial publication of the book was arranged in six thematically segregated sections:

- Spleen et Idéal (Spleen and Ideal)
- Tableaux parisiens (Parisian Scenes)
- Le Vin (Wine)
- Fleurs du mal (Flowers of Evil)
- Révolte (Revolt)
- La Mort (Death)

Baudelaire dedicated the book to his contemporary poet Théophile Gautier thus: Au parfait magicien des lettres françaises ("To the perfect magician of French letters").

=== Foreword ===
The foreword to the volume, Au Lecteur ("To the Reader"), identifying Satan with the legendary alchemist Hermes Trismegistus and calling boredom the worst of miseries, sets the general tone of what is to follow:

Si le viol, le poison, le poignard, l'incendie,
N'ont pas encore brodé de leurs plaisants dessins
Le canevas banal de nos piteux destins,
C'est que notre âme, hélas ! n'est pas assez hardie.

If rape, poison, dagger and fire,
Have still not embroidered their pleasant designs
On the banal canvas of our pitiable destinies,
It's because our soul, alas, is not bold enough!

The preface concludes with the following malediction

C'est l'Ennui!—l'œil chargé d'un pleur involontaire,
Il rêve d'échafauds en fumant son houka.
Tu le connais, lecteur, ce monstre délicat,
Hypocrite lecteur,—mon semblable,—mon frère!

It's Boredom!—eye brimming with an involuntary tear
He dreams of gallows while smoking his hookah.
You know him, reader, this delicate monster,
Hypocritical reader, my likeness, my brother!

== Tableaux Parisiens (Parisian Scenes) ==
Baudelaire's section Tableaux Parisiens, added in the second edition (1861), is considered one of the most formidable criticisms of 19th-century French modernity. This section contains 18 poems, most of which were written during Haussmann's renovation of Paris. Together, the poems in Tableaux Parisiens act as 24-hour cycle of Paris, starting with the second poem Le Soleil (The Sun) and ending with the second to last poem Le Crépuscule du Matin (Morning Twilight). The poems featured in this cycle of Paris all deal with the feelings of anonymity and estrangement from a newly modernized city. Baudelaire is critical of the clean and geometrically laid out streets of Paris which alienate the unsung anti-heroes of Paris who serve as inspiration for the poet: the beggar, the blind, the industrial worker, the gambler, the prostitute, the old, and the victim of imperialism. These characters whom Baudelaire once praised as the backbone of Paris are now eulogized in his nostalgic poems. For Baudelaire, the city has been transformed into an anthill of identical bourgeois that reflect the new identical structures that litter a Paris he once called home but can now no longer recognize.

== Literary significance and criticism ==
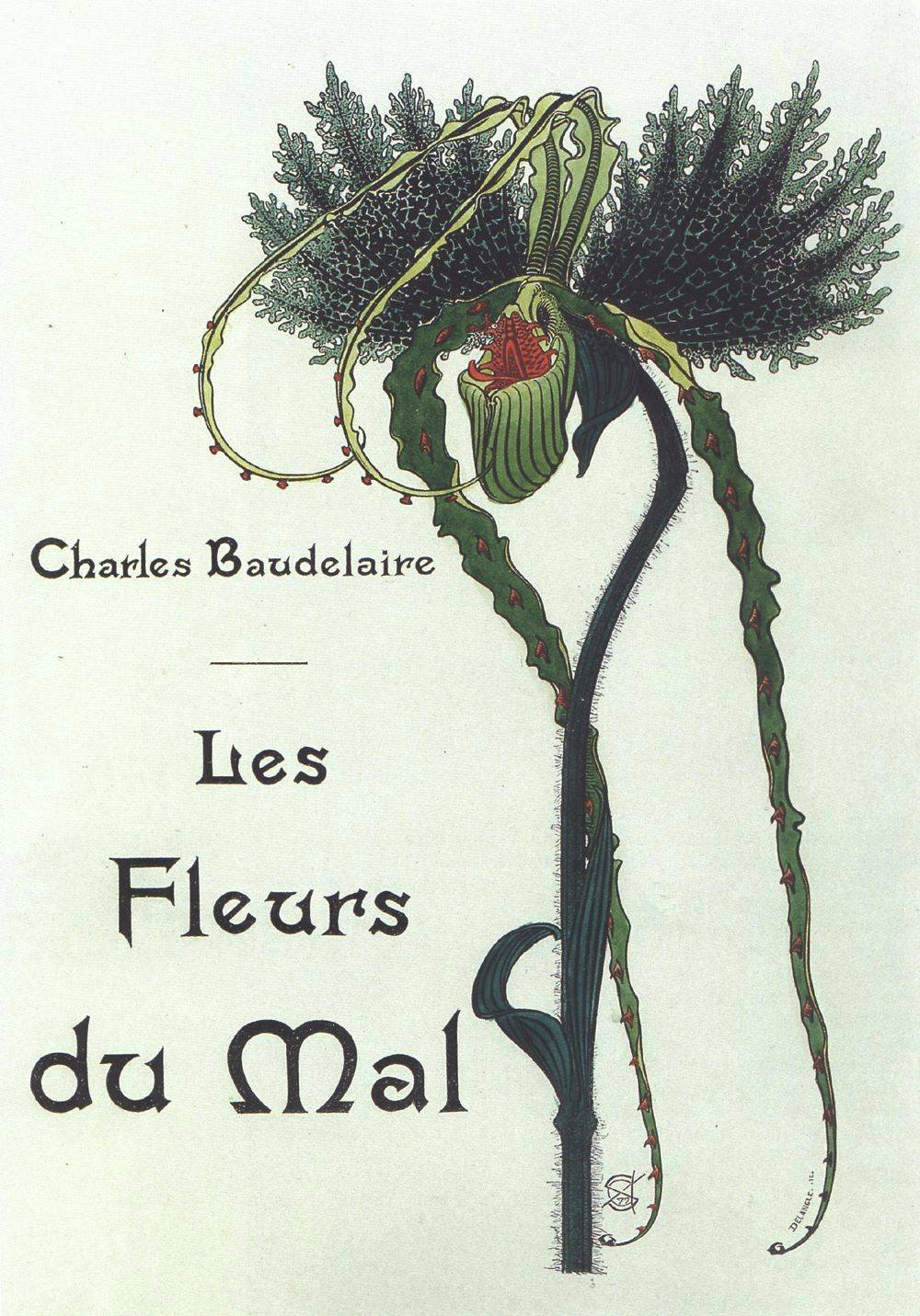
Illustration of Les Fleurs du Mal by Carlos Schwabe, 1900

The author and the publisher were prosecuted under the regime of the Second Empire as an outrage aux bonnes mœurs ("an insult to public decency"). As a consequence of this prosecution, Baudelaire was fined 300 francs. Six poems from the work were suppressed and the ban on their publication was not lifted in France until 1949. These poems were "Lesbos"; "Femmes damnées (À la pâle clarté)" (or "Women Doomed (In the pale glimmer...)"); "Le Léthé" (or "Lethe"); "À celle qui est trop gaie" (or "To Her Who Is Too Joyful"); "Les Bijoux" (or "The Jewels"); and "Les Métamorphoses du Vampire" (or "The Vampire's Metamorphoses"). These were later published in Brussels in a small volume titled Les Épaves (Scraps or Jetsam).

On the other hand, upon reading "The Swan" (or "Le Cygne") from Les Fleurs du mal, Victor Hugo announced that Baudelaire had created "un nouveau frisson" (a new shudder, a new thrill) in literature.

In the wake of the prosecution, a second edition was issued in 1861 which added 35 new poems, removed the six suppressed poems, and added a new section titled Tableaux Parisiens. Among the new poems was the widely-studied "L'albatros" ("The Albatross").

A posthumous third edition, with a preface by Théophile Gautier and including 14 previously unpublished poems, was issued in 1868.

== English translations ==
- Baudelaire, Charles (1909). The Flowers of Evil. Translated by Cyril Scott. Elkin Mathews.
- Baudelaire, Charles (1936). Flowers of Evil. Translated by George Dillon (poet); Edna St. Vincent Millay. Harper & Brothers.
- Baudelaire, Charles. (1940) Flowers of Evil. Translated by Dillon; Millay; Arthur Symons; Lord Alfred Douglas; Countee Cullen; Clark Ashton Smith; Aldous Huxley et al. Printed for Members of the Limited Editions Club at the Fanfare Press in London.
- Baudelaire, Charles (1954). The Flowers of Evil. Translated by William Aggeler. Academy Library Guild.
- Baudelaire, Charles (1955). The Flowers of Evil. Edited by Marthiel and Jackson Mathews. New Directions. An edition of selected poems was published in 1958. A complete, revised edition was published in 1963.
- Baudelaire, Charles (1961). The Flowers of Evil and Other Poems of Charles Baudelaire. Translated by Francis Duke. University of Virginia Press.
- Baudelaire, Charles (1982). Les Fleurs du mal: Bilingual Edition. Translated by Richard Howard. David R. Godine.
- Baudelaire, Charles (1993). The Flowers of Evil. Translated by James McGowan. Oxford University Press. ISBN 0-19-282972-6.
- Baudelaire, Charles (2006). The Flowers of Evil. Translated by Keith Waldrop. Wesleyan University Press.
- Baudelaire, Charles (2021). The Flowers of Evil. Translated by Aaron Poochigian. Liveright.
- Baudelaire, Charles (2021). Out of Evil, Flowers. Translated by Meredith Dutton. Barnes & Noble Press.
- Baudelaire, Charles (2024). The Flowers of Evil. Translated by Keith Miller. Quinx Books.
- Baudelaire, Charles (2025). The Flowers of Evil. Translated by Nathan Brown. Verso Books.

== Legacy ==
=== Music ===
Alban Berg's "Der Wein" (1929) is a concert aria setting Stefan George's translation of three poems from "Le Vin".

In 1969, American composer Ruth White released the album Flowers of Evil. It features electroacoustic composition with Baudelaire's poetry recited over it. The album was published by Limelight Records.

French avant-garde rock band Etron Fou Leloublan used the poem from Les Fleurs du Mal ''La Musique'' as lyrics for their song ''La Musique'' from their third studio album Les Poumons Gonflés which is named after a verse from it.

Rock band Buck-Tick named their 1990 album Aku no Hana, as well as its title track, after Les Fleurs du mal.

Avant-Garde music group Naked City named a track on their 1993 album Absinthe, which is inspired by 19th Century France in general, after Les Fleurs du Mal

Baudelaire's Flowers Of Evil (Les Fleurs Du Mal) is a 1968 recording by Yvette Mimieux and Ali Akbar Khan originally issued on LP by Connoisseur Society. Mimeux reads excerpts of Cyril Scott's 1909 translation with original music by Khan.

Henri Dutilleux's Tout un monde lointain... for cello and orchestra (1970) is strongly influenced by Les Fleurs du Mal. Each of its five movements is prefaced by a quotation from the volume and the title itself comes from one of its poems, "XXIII. La Chevelure".

The rock band Mountain released an album, Flowers of Evil, in 1971.

French Black Metal band Peste Noire used poems as lyrics for their songs "Le mort joyeux" and "Spleen" from their album La Sanie des siècles – Panégyrique de la dégénérescence.

French songwriter and musician Neige used poems from Les Fleurs du mal as lyrics for several songs that he wrote with different bands. "Élévation" (with Alcest) "Recueillement" (with Amesoeurs) "Le revenant" and "Ciel brouillé" (with Mortifera).

Industrial metal band Marilyn Manson released a song titled "The Flowers of Evil" on their 2012 album Born Villain.

Symphonic metal band Therion released an album named Les Fleurs du Mal in 2012.

The Swedish folk singer Sofia Karlsson (alongside Alex Landart, Negro Malick, Hugo Voy, Benjamin Coquille and Logan Pischedda) sang versions of "Le vin des amants" and "Moesta et errabunda", translated by the poet Dan Andersson, on her 2007 album Visor från vinden (Songs from the wind).

Rapper Izaya Tiji released a song titled "les fleurs du mal" in 2019.

=== Film and television ===
The 1945 film The Picture of Dorian Gray opens with Lord Henry Wotton reading the book during a hansom cab ride to Basil Hallward's home. A voice-over describing Lord Henry's amoral approach to life concludes: “…He diverted himself by exercising a subtle influence over the lives of others.” Telling the cabbie to wait, he tosses the book up to him.

The 1947 film Lured, starring Lucille Ball, searching for her friend, Lucy Barnard, missing and also believed to be the latest victim of the notorious "Poet Killer," who lures victims and afterwards sends poems to taunt the police. Scotland Yard believes the killer to be influenced by The Flowers of Evil.

In Jean-Luc Godard's 1965 film Pierrot le Fou, central character Ferdinand attends a dinner party, where he ends up having a conversation with the American filmmaker Samuel Fuller (played by himself). Fuller explains that he is there in Paris to film a movie titled "The Flowers of Evil." Ferdinand recognizes the reference to Baudelaire and goes on to engage the filmmaker on the subject of cinema.

Toshio Matsumoto's 1969 film Funeral Parade of Roses includes quotations from "Les Fleurs Du Mal" including a passage presented at the start of the film.

Don't Deliver Us from Evil (1971) is a French horror film in which two adolescent girls chant various poems from Les Fleurs Du Mal during a play before setting themselves on fire in a double suicide on stage.

In a January 1997 episode of the sitcom Friends titled "The One with All the Jealousy", Monica (Courteney Cox) asks her coworker Julio about his book. He says it's "Flowers of Evil by Baudelaire" and when Monica asks if he enjoyed it, he replies, "I thought I would, but the translation's no good."

A 2005 episode of the animated television show The Batman was named "Fleurs du Mal" in reference to the poem. In addition to this, a florist's shop in the episode is named Baudelaire's.

In episode 13 of the TV series Saving Hope's first season (2012), a copy of The Flowers of Evil is among the personal effects of a patient. Later in the episode a doctor briefly discusses Baudelaire and a phrase from the book with that patient.

The movie Immortal (2004, Dominique Brunner); In the scene on the Eiffel Tower, Jill (Linda Hardy) is reading from the book Les Fleurs Du Mal. She recites the third stanza from the poem "XLIX. Le Poison".

=== Theatre ===
Chicago-based artistic collective Theater Oobleck produced a series of cantastoria using Baudelaire's Les Fleurs du Mal as text.

Canadian-French musical Don Juan (2003) includes a scene/song Les Fleurs du Mal between the title character and his friend Don Carlo. They have an argument about the self-indulgent and vain lifestyle of Don Juan.

=== Poetry ===
T.S. Eliot's poem The Waste Land (1922) references "Au Lecteur" with the line: "You! hypocrite lecteur!—mon semblable,—mon frère!"

=== Prose ===
Geographer and political economist David Harvey includes the poem "The Eyes of the Poor" in a book chapter called "The Political Economy of Public Space".

In Roger Zelazny's book Roadmarks the protagonist Red Dorakeen travels with a sentient speaking computer disguised as a cybernetic extension of the book Les Fleurs du mal named "Flowers of Evil". It befriends another computer which has disguised itself as Leaves of Grass by Walt Whitman.

=== Anime and manga ===
The 2009 manga Aku no Hana is named after Les Fleurs du mal. The main character, Takao Kasuga, is enamored with the book and the adult depravity that it represents. In 2013, a 13-episode anime adaptation was aired.

=== Other ===
The first two stanzas of the poem “Élévation” were included on the Voyager Golden Record, read aloud by France's then UN representative Bernadette Lefort.

== List of poems ==
=== Edition of 1857 ===
- Au Lecteur

==== Spleen et Idéal ====
- Bénédiction;
- L'Albatros;
- Élévation;
- Correspondances;
- J'aime le souvenir de ces époques nues;
- Les Phares;
- La Muse malade;
- La Muse vénale;
- Le Mauvais Moine;
- L'Ennemi;
- Le Guignon;
- La Vie antérieure;
- Bohémiens en voyage;
- L'Homme et la Mer;
- Don Juan aux enfers;
- Châtiment de l'orgueil;
- La Beauté;
- L'Idéal;
- La Géante;
- Les Bijoux - censored;
- Parfum exotique;
- Je t'adore à l'égal de la voûte nocturne;
- Tu mettrais l'univers entier dans ta ruelle;
- Sed non satiata;
- Avec ses vêtements ondoyants et nacrés;
- Le Serpent qui danse;
- Une charogne;
- De Profundis clamavi;
- Le Vampire;
- Le Léthé - censored;
- Une nuit que j'étais près d'une affreuse Juive;
- Remords posthume;
- Le Chat (Viens, mon beau chat, sur mon cour amoureux);
- Le Balcon;
- Je te donne ces vers afin que si mon nom;
- Tout entière;
- Que diras-tu ce soir, pauvre âme solitaire;
- Le Flambeau vivant;
- À Celle qui est trop gaie - censored;
- Réversibilité;
- Confession;
- L'Aube spirituelle;
- Harmonie du soir;
- Le Flacon;
- Le Poison;
- Ciel brouillé;
- Le Chat (Dans ma cervelle se promène);
- Le Beau Navire;
- L'Invitation au voyage;
- L'Irréparable;
- Causerie;
- L'Héautontimorouménos;
- Franciscæ meæ laudes;
- À une dame créole;
- Mœsta et errabunda;
- Les Chats;
- Les Hiboux;
- La Cloche fêlée;
- Spleen :
  - I - Pluviôse, irrité contre la ville entière,
  - II - J'ai plus de souvenirs que si j'avais mille ans,
  - III - Je suis comme le roi d'un pays pluvieux,
  - IV - Quand le ciel bas et lourd pèse comme un couvercle;
- Brumes et pluies;
- L’Irrémédiable;
- À une Mendiante rousse;
- Le Jeu;
- Le Crépuscule du soir;
- Le Crépuscule du matin;
- La servante au grand cœur dont vous étiez jalouse;
- Je n'ai pas oublié, voisine de la ville;
- Le Tonneau de la haine;
- Le Revenant;
- Le Mort joyeux;
- Sépulture;
- Tristesses de la lune;
- La Musique;
- La Pipe;
- Le Masque;
- Hymne à la beauté;
- La Chevelure;
- Duellum;
- Le Possédé;
- Un Fantôme :
  - I - Les ténèbres,
  - II - Le Parfum,
  - III - Le Cadre,
  - IV - Le Portrait;
- Semper eadem;
- Chant d'automne;
- À une Madone;
- Chanson d'après-midi;
- Sisina;
- Sonnet d'automne;
- Une Gravure fantastique;
- Obsession;
- Le Goût du Néant;
- Alchimie de la douleur;
- Horreur sympathique;
- L'Horloge.

==== Tableaux parisiens ====
- Paysage;
- Le Soleil;
- À une mendiante rousse;
- Le Cygne;
- Les Sept Vieillards;
- Les Petites Vieilles;
- Les Aveugles
- À une Passante
- Le Squelette laboureur;
- Le Crépuscule du soir;
- Le Jeu;
- Danse macabre;
- L'Amour du mensonge;
- Brumes et Pluies;
- Rêve parisien;
- Le Crépuscule du matin.

Le Vin

- L’Âme du vin ;
- Le Vin des chiffonniers ;
- Le Vin de l’assassin ;
- Le Vin du solitaire ;
- Le Vin des amants.

==== Fleurs du mal ====
- La Destruction ;
- Une Martyre ;
- Lesbos - pièce condamnée ;
- Femmes damnées - Delphine et Hippolyte - censored ;
- Femmes damnées (Comme un bétail pensif sur le sable couchées) ;
- Les Deux Bonnes Sœurs ;
- La Fontaine de sang ;
- Allégorie ;
- La Béatrice ;
- Les Métamorphoses du Vampire - censored ;
- Un Voyage à Cythère ;
- L'Amour et le crâne.

==== Révolte ====
- Le Reniement de Saint-Pierre ;
- Abel et Caïn ;
- Les Litanies de Satan.

=== Later additions ===
==== Les Épaves ====
- Le Coucher du soleil romantique;
- Le Jet d'eau;
- Les Yeux de Berthe;
- Hymne;
- Les Promesses d'un Visage;
- Le Monstre ou le Paranymphe d'une Nymphe macabre;
- Vers pour le Portrait de M. Honoré Daumier;
- Lola de Valence;
- Sur « Le Tasse en prison » d'Eugène Delacroix;
- La Voix;
- L'Imprévu;
- La Rançon;
- À une Malabaraise;
- Sur les débuts d'Amina Boschetti;
- À propos d'un importun;
- Un Cabaret folâtre.

==== Edition of 1868 ====
- Le Gouffre;
- Le Couvercle;
- L'Examen de minuit;
- L'Avertisseur;
- Le Rebelle;
- Les Plaintes d'un Icare;
- La Prière d'un Païen;
- Bien loin d'ici;
- Madrigal triste;
- La Lune offensée;
- Recueillement;
- Épigraphe pour un livre condamné.
