= Theater Oobleck =

Theater Oobleck is a theater troupe in Chicago. It began in the 1980s in Ann Arbor, Michigan as Streetlight Theater, so named to indicate the itinerant nature of the troupe, "The idea being that it could be performed anywhere, even under a streetlight" according to co-founder Mickle Maher. Theater Oobleck was co-founded by Jeff Dorchen, Mickle Maher, David Isaacson and Danny Thompson. The name "Oobleck" came from the 1949 Dr. Seuss book Bartholomew and the Oobleck. The troupe moved to Chicago in 1988, where it has continued to produce original scripts.

Notably, Theater Oobleck works without a director. In her Backstage article "Oobleck Rising", Kerry Reid defends Theater Oobleck's "no director" philosophy from the skepticism expressed by Sid Smith, an entertainment writer for the Chicago Tribune. Reid cites a quote from Smith's 1988 review (titled "An Audacious Gust Of Undergraduate Air") of the Oobleck production Three Who Dared: A Play on the Movies, "The players boast in the program that they work without a director. They desperately need one..." to which Reid responds, "... non-hierarchical methodology wasn't the reason to love Oobleck. The end results were what counted".

Oobleck plays often feature famous historical or contemporary characters, juxtaposition, playful language, humor, and political thought. Two plays written and produced by Theater Oobleck have been published. Previous plays performed by Theater Oobleck include The Strangerer, Strauss at Midnight, and Hunchback Variations.
