= Charles Asselineau =

French writer and art critic (1820–1874)

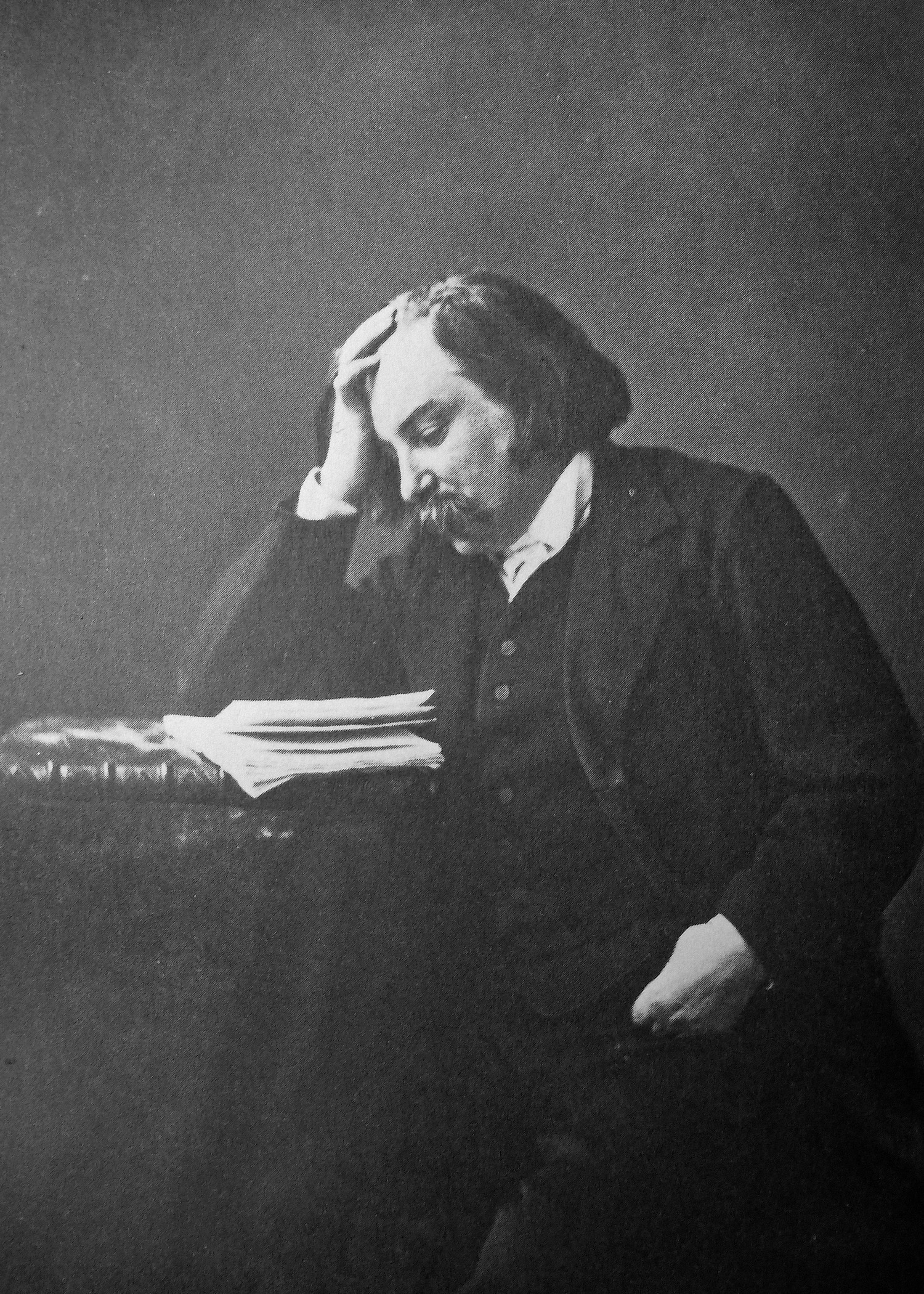
- Photograph of Asselineau by Nadar, c.1860.
- Born: 13 March 1820; Paris
- Died: 25 July 1874 (aged 54); Châtel-Guyon
- Education: Lycée Condorcet
- Occupations: Writer, art critic

Charles Asselineau (French pronunciation: [ʃaʁl aslino]; 13 March 1820 – 25 July 1874) was a French writer and art critic. He is also notable as one of the few close friends of the poet Charles Baudelaire. He was born in Paris and died in Châtel-Guyon.

== Biography ==
Asselineau studied in the Lycée Condorcet where he became friends with Nadar. He started medical studies before switching to literary studies.

He met and became a close friend of Baudelaire in 1845. A year after Baudelaire's death, Asselineau together with Banville published a 3rd edition of Les fleurs du mal. In 1869, he writes the first biography of Baudelaire: Charles Baudelaire, sa vie et son œuvre.
