= Anti-Urban =

EP by Drudkh
- Released: April 16, 2007
- Genre: Black metal, doom metal
- Length: 13:15
- Label: Supernal Music

Drudkh chronology
Songs of Grief and Solitude (2006)	Anti-Urban (2007)	Estrangement (2007)

Professional ratings
Review scores
Source	Rating
Chronicles of Chaos	(8.5/10)

Anti-Urban is an EP released by Ukrainian black metal band Drudkh on April 16, 2007 (see 2007 in music), by Supernal Music. It is the band's first EP and sixth release overall. It is only available directly from the label, and has been limited to a two-time-only pressing of 999 (of which only 992 were actually made) 10-inch vinyl records. In 2009, it was re-released in mini CD format by French label Season of Mist. This version was available only as a part of a box-set edition of their album Microcosmos, limited only to 500 copies.

The first rip of the album to circulate around the Internet was taken, incorrectly, from a 33.3 RPM playing of the album. The album was intended to be played at 45 RPM, and therefore the nine-minute-plus versions of Anti-Urban tracks floating around the Internet are improperly ripped.

This album, like Forgotten Legends, has vocals that are low in the mix, and the first track is entirely instrumental. As with Drudkh's first two albums, the lyrics to Anti-Urban have not been released. The tracks are rumoured to be outtakes from the Forgotten Legends sessions, although this has not been officially confirmed.

== Track listing ==
No.	Title	Length
1.	"Fallen into Oblivion"	6:53
2.	"Ashes"	6:22
Total length:		13:15
