= Estrangement (album) =

Estrangement Відчуженість

Studio album by Drudkh
- Released: August 25, 2007
- Genre: Black metal, pagan metal
- Length: 36:26
- Label: Supernal Music

Drudkh chronology
Anti-Urban (2007)	Estrangement; Відчуженість (2007)	Microcosmos (2009)

Professional ratings
Review scores
Source	Rating
Ultimate Guitar	8.7/10
Metal Storm	8.0/10

Estrangement (Ukrainian: Відчуженість, romanized: Vidchuzhenist) is the sixth album by Ukrainian black metal band Drudkh, released in August 2007 (see 2007 in music). The album was previously known under the title River of Tears, but then had a name change. Its songs have a minimalistic influence and also features the band's first prominent use of blast beats since The Swan Road. All the lyrics of the album are based on the 1931–1932 works of the Ukrainian poet Oleh Olzhych. A spoken introduction in the first track is taken from the 1995 Ukrainian feature film Atentat about the life and assassination of Stepan Bandera, and says in Ukrainian, "We shall always be there" (taken from a scene in the film when former soldiers of the Ukrainian Insurgent Army, having escaped from the Soviet prosecution after the end of World War II, arrive in the USA as immigrants; meaning in the context that the hearts of the Ukrainian patriots shall remain forever in occupied Ukraine).

In 2010, it was re-released as digipak with new artwork and re-mastered sound by Season of Mist.

== Track listing ==
No.	Title	Length
1.	"Самітня нескінченна тропа (Solitary Endless Path)"	10:54
2.	"Небо у наших ніг (Skies at Our Feet)"	10:42
3.	"Там, де закінчуються обрії (Where Horizons End)"	10:52
4.	"Тільки вітер пам'ятає моє ім'я (Only the Wind Remembers My Name)"	3:58
Total length:		36:26

== Personnel ==
- Thurios – vocals, guitars, keyboards
- Roman (Roman Saenko) – guitars
- Krechet – bass
- Vlad – drums, keyboards
