= Peste Noire =

French black metal band

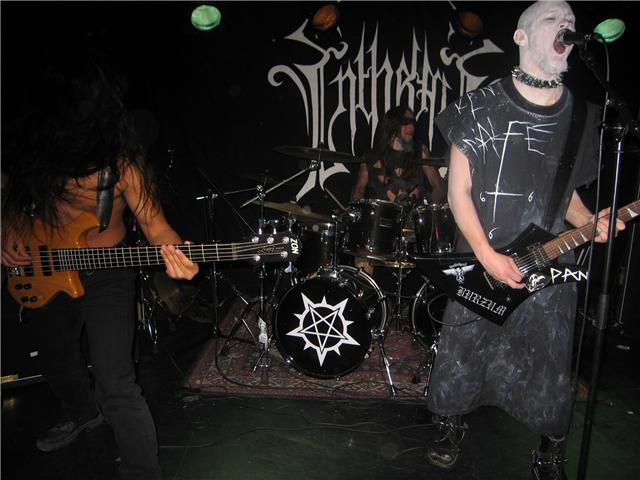
- Peste Noire at Betong (Oslo, Norway) on 19 January 2008.

Background information
- Origin: Avignon, France
- Genres: Black metal; avant-garde metal; folk metal; french hip-hop (later discography)
- Years active: 2000–present
- Labels: La mesnie Herlequin, Drakkar Productions, De Profundis éditions, Northern Heritage Records, Militant Zone
- Members: Famine
- Past members: Argoth; Neige; Winterhalter; Andy Julia; Indria; Ardraos; Audrey Sylvain; Spellgoth; Baal; Yurii
- Website: https://www.lamesnieherlequin.com/

Peste Noire are a French black metal band from La Chaise-Dieu. The band was formed in 2000, by "La sale Famine de Valfunde" (Ludovic Faure), also known simply as "Famine". Their music uses standard black metal elements mixed with traditional Gallic instrumentation, and influences from genres like electronic, folk, punk, and trap. The band is sometimes referred to as P.N. or K.P.N (Kommando Peste Noire).

Despite having anarchist themes, the band is frequently grouped together with the French National Socialist black metal (NSBM) scene.

== History ==
Peste Noire was created by La sale Famine de Valfunde (i.e. "The filthy Famine of Valfunde") in Avignon in 2000, initially under the name Dor Daedeloth. Neige (Alcest), who played in the band's first eight years of existence, joined him on drums. Together they crafted four demos and one split demo tape. Argoth, a bass player also member of early Alcest fame, helped up to the 2002 "Mémoire Païenne" split with fellow French NSBM band Sombre Chemin. The band was supposed to release an album entitled Les Salisseurs de Lumière around 2005 and early 2006 through Drakkar Productions, but Famine was not satisfied with the production and decided to cancel the release.

In 2006, Famine hired new members Winterhalter (drums) and Indria (bass) to assist with La Sanie des siècles – Panégyrique de la dégénérescence, produced by French label De profundis éditions in August 2006. The music on their first effort was mostly melodic and sorrowful, turning at times towards a more aggressive and chaotic sound within lengthy and elaborate song structures. With hymns such as "Dueil Angoisseus", "Spleen", or "Le Mort Joyeux", the record caused a stir in the underground black metal scene. It helped establish the band on an international level.

De profundis éditions produced Peste Noire's second album Folkfuck Folie, released in June 2007. The lyrics can seem autobiographical and deal with apocalyptic themes, the triumph of the body over the mind, barbarism and wartime poetry, the spreading of sexually transmitted diseases, and mental disorder and feature a deliberately poor production quality, and the music was much more chaotic, morose and dissonant so as to, as Famine described; "scare off trendies" who praised the band's debut album.

In March 2009, Peste Noire released their third album Ballade cuntre lo Anemi francor ("Ballad against the enemies of France") with a new line-up. The production was kept lo-fi and raw on purpose and features elements of post-punk, folk and traditional militant hymns and ballads, and it was also the band's first album with overtly nationalistic lyrics, featuring a French military march derived from "Warszawianka" (1905) called "Les hussards de Bercheny" and the band's interpretation of a 1909 chant called "La France Bouge" written for the Camelots du Roi, the violent youth organization of the French Far-right and Monarchist counter-revolutionary movement Action Française.

Having relocated to Auvergne, Famine created his own label, La mesnie Herlequin, in May 2011 to release the band's fourth release L'Ordure à l'état Pur ("The pure essence of garbage"). The album booklet contains anti-semitic, anti-feminist and anti-immigration caricatures and symbolism. It has stylistic influences from several genres, both old and modern mixed with the band's signature style of black metal, including Eurobeat, traditional Gallic music, French folk, Burlesque and Cabaret music, Electro-industrial and Hardcore punk, as well as featuring samples of news reports, BDSM orgies and riots. The album was widely praised for being so musically dynamic and eccentric.

A Canadian division of La mesnie Herlequin called "LMH Amérique" was created by Transcendental Creations in association with the band; it was active in 2011, but the association was ended by Famine in 2013 due to wholesale overpricing on LMH Amérique's part, as well as withholding owed royalties. All Peste Noire material and merchandise produced by Transcendental Creations is now considered bootleg by the band.

The band's fifth album, self-titled as Peste Noire, was released in June 2013 on their own label. It was entirely composed, recorded and mixed by Famine and new drummer Ardraos. The album's theme is anti-urban and inspired by local history, folklore and legends, and contains Oi! influences. The album featured guest vocals by Roman Saenko of Drudkh and Hate Forest fame, Ravenlord and Melkor of the controversial Swedish band Woods of Infinity, and Lord Arawn from Sacrificia Mortuorum

La Chaise-Dyable, the band's sixth album, was recorded at La mesnie Herlequin and released in 2015, musically the album sees the band continue the style and influences featured in the previous self-titled album and the lyrics, according to Famine deal with countryside boredom and monotony, anarchism and the region of La Chaise-Dieu. In a first for the group, the second version of the song "Dans ma nuit" was the subject of a professional music video directed by Anaon Productions, who also produced a documentary for the band mainly about the album's production but also about the band's concept and views. It was around this time that Famine began openly showing his support for the Azov battalion in Ukraine. Another music video was made in 2017 for the song "Le dernier putsch", it featured М8Л8ТХ founder and frontman Alexey Levkin who also helped co-produce the video with his label Militant Zone, as well as organize a private release screening of the video for both bands, their fans and invited guests like Finnish NSBM band Goatmoon.

The band signed with the Ukrainian NSBM label Militant Zone in 2015 after the release of La Chaise-Dyable. The band released their seventh studio album Peste Noire – Split – Peste Noire in 2018, through Militant Zone and in collaboration with their own label La mesnie Herlequin. The album was panned for its overtly racist cover and lyrics, as well as for featuring Trap music and Hardcore rap.

In October 2016, Peste Noire was taken off of the concert schedule of Drohende Schatten's Sinister Howling V Festival in Speyer, Germany. Norwegian band One Tail One Head replaced them. Peste Noire was forced off the black metal festival by officials of the city of Speyer. This would have been Peste Noire's first festival performance in ten years. German politician Katrin Werner wrote an open letter to Hansjörg Eger, Mayor of Speyer, warning that Peste Noire was planning to perform somewhere nearby, but one day earlier. Werner pointed out the connections between Peste Noire and neo-Nazi symbols or music, describing the logo of Peste Noire as the same skull and crossbones as the American white supremacist group White Aryan Resistance, and she said that the label Northern Heritage had published a collaboration between Peste Noire and the Finnish band Horna which has been connected to neo-Nazi black metal bands through their record label. Werner said that Famine has been photographed in front of Nazi backgrounds, and that Famine has used the Nazi salute.

On 15 May 2021, Famine announced that a new Peste Noire album titled Le retour des pastoureaux would be released on September on vinyl and CD exclusively through La mesnie Herlequin, a live acoustic 12-inch EP recorded in Kyiv during Asgardsrei 2018, was also announced and released in November, again exclusively through the band's label. Le retour des pastoureaux was also uploaded by Famine on the official La mesnie Herlequin YouTube account on 3 September. On 25 May 2021, Famine was found guilty for the 12 July 2018, assault of a man inside a bar, the plaintiff was hospitalized due to a broken jaw and was reportedly suffering from PTSD. Famine fled to Ukraine afterwards where he stayed with his associates from Militant Zone until September 2020, upon his return to France he was subsequently arrested. He received a six months suspended prison sentence, which will be effective for 5 years, plus a fine of 3000 euros pending further adjustment for the victim's expenses, another man from the same incident also filed an assault complaint against Famine for a broken nose, though Famine denies having hit him.

== Miscellaneous recordings, releases and guest appearances ==
In April 2007, the Finnish label Northern Heritage, owned by controversial Black Metal and right wing-associated artist Mikko Aspa, released PN's Lorraine Rehearsal 12-inch EP. The EP featured "rehearsal" songs recorded in Lorraine from August 2006. A limited tape edition was also released on Roman Saenko (Hate Forest, Drudkh)'s label Night Birds Records in 2009.

At the same period, Famine, under his own name Valfunde, released a split 7-inch EP with Amesoeurs produced by De profundis éditions in November 2007, containing unreleased songs, recorded in low quality on purpose. Famine quickly dropped the idea of Valfunde as a side-project. Instead, Famine used the post-punk ideas he had for Valfunde on Peste Noire's third album Ballade cuntre lo Anemi francor (2009).

A self-released double protape box Mors orbis terrarum containing all tracks from the early, sold-out demo tapes was released in 2007, and later re-released in a vinyl edition. A split 7-inch EP with controversial Finnish band Horna was also released in 2007 through Debemur Morti Productions.

La Sanie des siècles was repressed by De profundis éditions and Transcendental Creations on CD in August 2008. A vinyl version of the album was co-produced by De profundis éditions and Finnish label Ahdistuksen Aihio Productions in August 2009. The tape version was produced in 2013 by Night Birds Records in collaboration with Todestrieb records.

A tape version of Ballade cuntre lo Anemi francor was released in March 2009 by the label Tour de Garde from Quebec.

A limited vinyl version of Folkfuck Folie co-produced by Northern Heritage and De profundis éditions was released in April 2010. A limited tape edition of Folkfuck Folie was also released on Roman Saenko's Night Birds Records at the same time. In that same year, Famine wrote the lyrics of one song for Canadian black metal band Akitsa's fourth album Au crépuscule de l'espérance.

Famine also collaborated with fellow French black metal band Sale Freux twice; doing guest vocals for their albums La mélancolie des pennes; released in December 2011, and L'exil; released in May 2012 by Famine's own label La mesnie Herlequin.

In April 2012, La mesnie Herlequin released Les démos, a double CD boxset containing all the Peste Noire demos (all the songs recorded between 2001 and 2005), including the Valfunde tracks.

In August 2012, La mesnie Herlequin repressed Peste Noire's third album Ballade cuntre lo Anemi francor on CD with new artwork. The first pressing had been released by De profundis éditions in March 2009.

In September 2013, Famine was featured on Swedish band Shining's 8 ½ – Feberdrömmar I Vaket Tillstånd album. He sang on "Terres des Anonymes", a rerecording of "Fields of Faceless" (from "III – Angst – Självdestruktivitetens emissarie") with French lyrics.

In July 2014, a collaborative split 12-inch LP was recorded with Parisian group Diapsiquir, titled Rats des Villes VS Rats des Champs, released by La mesnie Herlequin. Peste Noire took the famous poem "Le rat de ville et le rat des champs" by Jean de La Fontaine as its main inspiration behind the split's title. in December of the same year, Famine appeared as a guest vocalist for then Peste Noire drummer Ardraos' band Sühnopfer's second album Offertoire.

In 2015, Famine and Sün of NSBM band Aktion Totenkopf formed Vouïvre after a trip to Paris. The band also features former Peste Noire drummer Ardraos and keyboardist HGH also of Aktion Totenkopf and Elitism (also an NSBM band). They recorded the 12-inch EP Au gouffre which was released on 26 September 2017 through La mesnie Herlequin. It features guest vocals by Anthony Mignoni aka Xaphan of Seigneur Voland, another well-known band from the French NSBM scene. Ardraos and Famine left Vouïvre after the release of the EP.

Famine was featured as a guest vocalist for 2 songs on the fourth М8Л8ТХ album Reconquista, which was released on 14 December 2018 by Militant Zone.

== Themes and politics ==
In the band's early days, Famine described his beliefs and the band's ideology as a fusion of nationalism and satanism, or "pan-European Satanism" as he called it, and the band's lyrics focused primarily on French nationalism and the works of famed French poets like Charles Baudelaire and Antonin Artaud. However, in later years the band began focusing on themes of urban and modern decadence, French countrysides, and hedonism while expressing anarchist ideology, such as that espoused by French philosopher and father of anarchism Pierre-Joseph Proudhon.

== Exposure ==
Peste Noire lays claim to its underground status by choice, not by accident. The group has always signed with small independent labels which exist on the periphery of the commercial mainstream circuit; a circuit which is incompatible with the ideology of black metal, according to Famine. In 2011 Famine pushed this approach even further by creating his own label and studio, La mesnie Herlequin, located in La Chaise-Dieu, in order to have complete control over the production, recording and distribution of his work, and to dispense with all the middlemen that stood between its creation and sale.

== Concerts ==
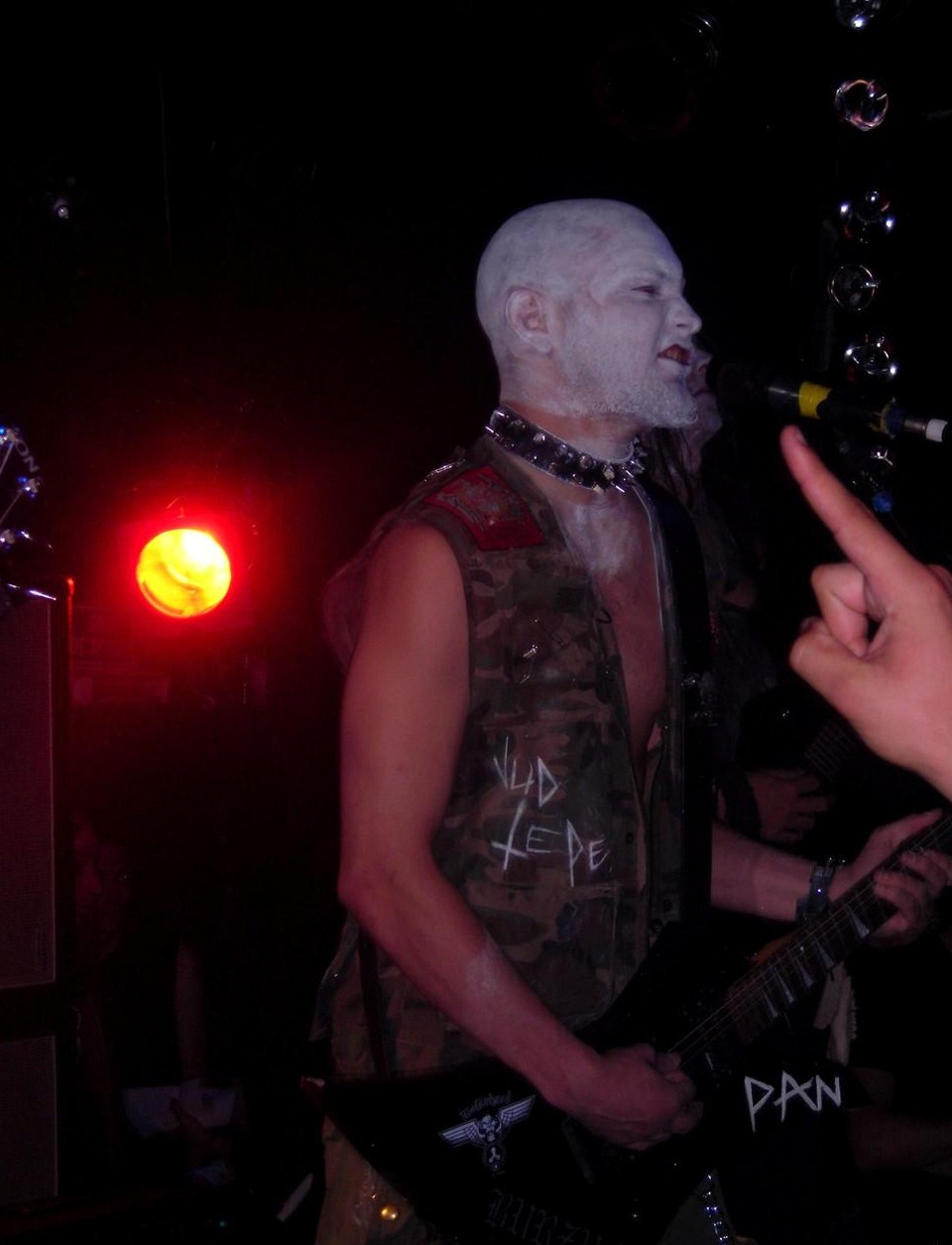
Peste Noire in Lyon's Hall on 23 June 2007

The band became infamous for their chaotic and wild concerts in their homeland of France and various underground events throughout Europe. However, Peste Noire's live activities became less frequent, primarily because of boycotts, bans and cancellations; most notably, the band was dropped from the 2017 edition of Blasfest in Bergen, Norway amidst threats from Norwegian Antifascist groups, which ended up cancelling the festival altogether. One of their last and most noteworthy live performance in a major festival was on Steelfest 2017 in Finland.

Recently, Peste Noire has mostly played live at the neo-Nazi Asgardsrei festival, having performed three years in a row, from 2016 to 2018, there. P.N. have strong connections and projects with Militant Zone, the organizers of the festival.

== Members ==
Current

- La sale Famine de Valfunde (Ludovic Faure) – guitars, lead vocals, bass guitar, épinette des Vosges, harmonica (2000–present)

Former

- Neige (Stéphane Paut) – drums (2001–2005), bass guitar (2005–2009), vocals (2006–2007), guitar (2007–2008)
- Argoth – bass guitar (2001–2002)
- Winterhalter (Jean Deflandre) – drums (2006–2008)
- Indria Saray – bass guitar (2006–2008, 2011–2012)
- Andy Julia – drums (2009)
- Sainte Audrey-Yolande de la Molteverge – vocals, Hammond organ, piano (2009–2016)
- Vicomte Chtedire de Kroumpadis (A. M.) – drums (2011–2012)
- Ardraos (Florian Denis) – accordion, drums (2012–2018)
- Spellgoth (Tuomas Rytkönen) – keyboards (2018)
- Baal – drums and percussion (2018–2023)
- Yurii – bass (2018–2023)
- Horn - drums and percussion, keyboards.

Former live members

- Ashcariot (Marc) – bass guitar (2016–2017)
- Björn – guitars (2016–2017)
- Snorr le Porc – guitars (2016–2017)
- Thorwald – backing vocals (2016)

== Discography ==
Studio albums

- La Sanie des siècles – Panégyrique de la dégénérescence (2006)
- Folkfuck Folie (2007)
- Ballade cuntre lo Anemi francor (2009)
- L'Ordure à l'état Pur (2011)
- Peste Noire (2013)
- La Chaise-Dyable (2015)
- Peste Noire – Split – Peste Noire (2018)
- Le retour des pastoureaux (2021)
- Livre III - On s'en fout (2025)

EPs

- Lorraine Rehearsal (vinyl) (2007)
- Acoustic live, Kiev (2021)
- Livre I - Antîoche (2023)
- Livre II - Dîeppe (2024)

Split albums

- Mémoire Païenne (split with Sombre Chemin) (2002)
- Horna/Peste Noire (split with Horna) (2007)
- Rats des Villes VS Rats des Champs (split with Diapsiquir) (2014)

Compilations

- Mors orbis terrarum (2007)
- Les démos (2012)
- Trilogie (2025)

Demos

- Aryan Supremacy (2001)
- Macabre transcendance... (2002)
- Phalènes et pestilence – Salvatrice averse (2003)
- Phalènes et pestilence (2005)
