= Fursy Teyssier =

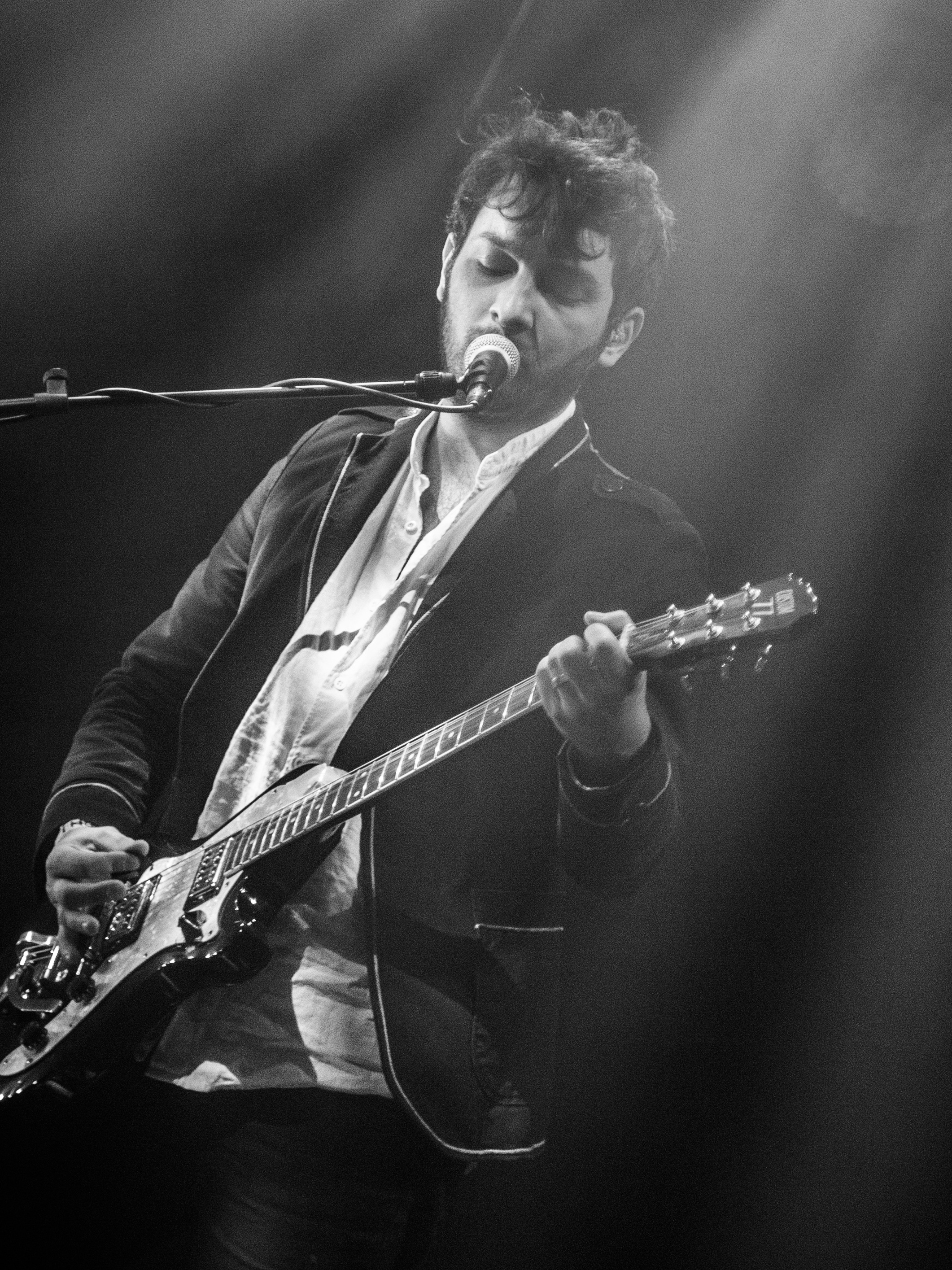
- Fursy Teyssier performing with Les Discrets at the Roadburn Festival, 2017.

Background information
- Born: 22 September 1985 (age 40)
- Genres: Shoegazing; post-metal; post-rock; post-black metal; post-punk
- Occupations: Singer; songwriter; musician; animator; graphic designer
- Instruments: Vocals; guitar; bass; keyboards
- Member of: Les Discrets
- Formerly of: Amesoeurs
- Website: http://www.lesdiscrets.com/

Fursy Teyssier (born 22 September 1985) is a French songwriter, singer, multi-instrumentalist, animator, and graphic designer. He is most known for being the creator, leader, guitarist, bass guitarist, and lead vocalist of shoegazing band Les Discrets. He is currently the live bass guitarist for Empyrium. He is also the former guitarist and bass guitarist of Amesoeurs, and the former live bassist of Alcest (he also composed and performed "Abysses" in Écailles de Lune). Since 27 December 2015 he is a live member of German gothic metal band The Vision Bleak; he previously directed the music video for their song "The Wood Hag".

As a cover artist, he has made the cover art for most of Alcest and Les Discrets' albums, and for various other bands, including Agalloch and Morbid Angel. He also directed several animated short films.

== Discography ==
=== Amesoeurs ===
- Amesoeurs (2009)

=== Les Discrets ===
==== Studio albums ====
- Septembre et Ses Dernières Pensées (2010)
- Ariettes oubliées... (2012)
- Prédateurs (2017)

==== Split releases ====
- Les Discrets / Alcest with Alcest (2009)
- Les Discrets / Arctic Plateau with Arctic Plateau (2011)

=== As a guest ===
- Alcest - Écailles de Lune (2010) - composer, keyboards and various others in "Abysses"
- Arctic Plateau - The Enemy Inside (2012) - backing vocals in "Loss and Love"

== Cover art ==
- Fake Oddity - Pink Strasse (2005)
- Amesoeurs - Ruines Humaines (2006)
- Alcest - Souvenirs d'un autre monde (2007)
- The American Dollar - The Technicolour Sleep (2007)
- Alcest/Angmar - Aux Funérailles du Monde.../Tristesse Hivernale with Angmar (2007)
- Miserere Luminis - Miserere Luminis (2008)
- Lantlôs - Lantlôs (2008)
- Underjordiska/Spectral Lore - Underjordiska/Spectral Lore (2008)
- Neun Welten - Destrunken (2009)
- Amesoeurs - Amesoeurs (2009)
- Woods of Ypres - Allure of the Earth (2009)
- Arctic Plateau - On a Sad Sunny Day (2009)
- Alcest/Les Discrets - Alcest/Les Discrets (2009)
- Alcest - Écailles de Lune (2010)
- Agalloch - The Wooden Box (2010)
- The Northern Ontario Black Metal Preservation Society - Future Northern Prosperity (2010)
- Les Discrets - Septembre et Ses Dernières Pensées (2010)
- Compilation of various artists - Whom The Moon A Nightsong Sings (2010)
- Drudkh - Handful of Stars (2010)
- Lantlôs - .neon (2010)
- Woods of Ypres - Home (2011)
- Les Discrets/Arctic Plateau - Les Discrets/Arctic Plateau (2011)
- Morbid Angel - Illud Divinum Insanus – The Remixes (2012)
- Alcest - Les Voyages de l'Âme (2012)
- Arctic Plateau - The Enemy Inside (2012)
- Les Discrets - Ariettes oubliées... (2012)
- Apocynthion - Sidereus Nuncius (2013)
- Sombres Forêts - La mort du soleil (2013)
- Trees of Eternity - Hour of the Nightingale (2016)
- God is an Astronaut - Epitaph (2018)
