= Prédateurs =

Studio album by Les Discrets
- Released: 21 April 2017
- Recorded: January–April 2015
- Genres: Indie rock, trip hop, electronic rock, post-rock, space rock
- Length: 43:08
- Languages: French, english
- Label: Prophecy Productions
- Producer: Fursy Teyssier

Les Discrets chronology
Rue Octavio Mey / Fleur des Murailles (2017)	Prédateurs (2017)

Prédateurs (transl. Predators) is the third full-length album by French band Les Discrets, released by Prophecy Productions on 21 April 2017. It is their first album without drummer Winterhalter, who left in 2013 to focus on his other band, Alcest, and their first as a duo.

Self-described as "the soundtrack of a slow film noir happening in a train where the journey leads the auditor to several places seen from the windows", Prédateurs is a musical departure from the shoegazing and post-rock sound of previous albums, shifting towards an indie rock sound influenced by electronic music, trip hop, and 1970's film soundtracks. Two EPs, Virée Nocturne, which preceded it in August 2016, and Rue Octavio Mey / Fleur des Murailles earlier that year, which were meant to prepare audiences for the upcoming change of the band's sound, several songs from the EPs are featured on the album.

== Production ==
=== Writing ===
Writing for the album started in 2012, shortly after the release of Ariettes oubliées... Teyssier originally started to write song in the same vein as previous Les Discrets works, but realized that he was disinterested in the result; after taking a break from music, he chose to create a new project, titled Saint Paul, which would follow a different musical direction, but after the project failed to come to life, decided instead to make it Les Discrets' third album, despite the artistic differences.

According to Teyssier, "Prédateurs is a record for late evenings, night driving, journeys on a train, or for those moments we usually think about the meaning of life and things, when we have nothing else to do but sit and wait. Its main themes are time, nature and life [...] "I feel that Les Discrets has its own wings now, free of the influences of post-rock, post-black or post-anything constraints. He mentioned Massive Attack and Portishead as notable influences.

As with Les Discrets' previous works, the album features both original lyrics by Hadorn and tracks using texts from classic French poets: Henri de Régnier for "Le Reproche" and Victor Hugo for "Fleur des Murailles." Teyssier's interpretation of De Régnier's text is that it is from the perspective of a woman blaming for man for having used her for years without ever giving her love or respect. Hugo's text was originally given to Teyssier by Hadorn as a gift, before they decided to use it for their music.

=== Recording and post-production ===
The album's recording was completed in April 2015, with Teyssier completing the mixing in April of the following year.

The album's club came from a discussion about the album between Teyssier and Alcest leader Neige. According to Teyssier, the album's main idea is "to be careful not to lose more than we already lost." Prédateurs is the first work of Les Discrets, for which Teyssier was not in charge of the cover art, and it was the work of British photographer Chris Friel.

== Reception ==
Professional ratings
Review scores
Source	Rating
Angry Metal Guy	Mixed
Diamond in the Groove	7.5/10 stars
Ghost Cult	8/10 stars
Itdjents	7/10 stars
Metal Exposure	7.5/10 stars
Metal Temple	8/10 stars
Sputnikmusic	2.5/5 stars

Music critics praised the album's change in musical direction and atmosphere.

Metal Temple called Prédateurs "a unique and multifaceted release out of the ether" and "a stunning album that ties together all of the influences perfectly. Prédateurs makes us reflect not only on the world we live in, but also on our place in this world and the impact we have on it," and gave the album a rating of 8 out of 10. Diamond in the Groove called the album "an admirable advancement for the group in terms of their appropriation of broader influences from across the stylistic spectrum into their downcast sound and grieving lyricism, all of which ultimately further Teyssier’s artistic vision for the project [...] Prédateurs is a hypnotic union of all manner of sounds and styles that come together to form a beautifully dark rock record," and gave the album a rating of 7.5 out of 10.

Ghost Cult called the album "an example of a band unshackling from its roots and developing a whole new identity, yet still being as compelling, dark, and utterly special as before". Metal Exposure considered the album "a beautiful piece of art", stating "the album has a quality and feel that kept me listening in wonder and admiration".

Conversely, Sputnikmusic was critical of the different musical orientation, stating, "whether Prédateurs decides to be a little oddball or wallow in a murky rut, it ends up on the vexing end of the spectrum all the same. And that is what’s most disconcerting about this latest release from a once-promising project". The reviewer ended up giving the album a rating of 2.5 out of 5. Angry Metal Guy, despite acknowledging the "rich sense of depth" of the album, felt that most of the tracks "dwell in the realm of soppy, unmemorable post-rock that’s about as exciting as waiting to get picked up at the airport".

== Track listing ==
All music is composed by Fursy Teyssier, except where noted.

No.	Title	Lyrics	Music	Length
1.	"Prédateurs" (Predators)	Philip Wollen		1:57
2.	"Virée nocturne" (Nocturnal Trip)	Audrey Hadorn		3:57
3.	"Les Amis de minuit" (The Friends of Midnight)	Hadorn		4:54
4.	"Vanishing Beauties"	Teyssier		5:33
5.	"Fleur des murailles" (Walls Flower)	Victor Hugo		3:49
6.	"Le Reproche" (The Reproach)	Henri de Régnier		5:07
7.	"Les Jours d'or" (The Gold Days)	Hadorn		4:14
8.	"Rue Octavio Mey" (Octavio Mey Street)	Teyssier		5:31
9.	"The Scent of Spring (Moonraker)"	Teyssier	Teyssier, Markus Stock	4:50
10.	"Lyon - Paris 7h34" (Lyon - Paris 7:34 a.m)	instrumental	Teyssier, Stéphane Paut	3:16
Total length:				43:08

== Personnel ==
Les Discrets

- Fursy Teyssier - lead and backing vocals, guitars, bass, keyboards
- Audrey Hadorn - co-lead vocals on "Les Amis de Minuit", "Fleur des Murailles", and "Le Reproche", backing vocals

Additional personnel

- Jean Joly - drums
- Philip Wollen - speech on "Prédateurs"
- Markus Stock - co-arrangement on "The Scent of Spring (Moonraker)"
- Stéphane Paut - co-arrangement on "Lyon - Paris 7h34"
- Fursy Teyssier - recording, production
- Benoit Bel - mixing
- Harris Newman - mastering
- Chris Friel - cover art, photography
- Andy Julia - band photography
