= Blood in Our Wells =

Blood in Our Wells Кров у наших криницях

Studio album by Drudkh
- Released: March 23, 2006
- Recorded: 2005
- Genres: Black metal, pagan metal
- Length: 50:03
- Label: Supernal Music

Drudkh chronology
The Swan Road (2005)	Blood in Our Wells; Кров у наших криницях (2006)	Songs of Grief and Solitude (2006)

Blood in Our Wells (Ukrainian: Кров у наших криницях, romanized: Krov u nashykh krynytsyakh) is the fourth album by Ukrainian black metal band Drudkh, released in 2006. The name of the album comes from a line of the 1935 poem by Oleh Olzhych. The album's overall sound is more influenced by folk music and pagan metal than the band's previous releases, with most compositions consisting of two or more interlocking movements.

As with The Swan Road, lyrics are taken from classical Ukrainian literature. The lyrics to "Furrows of Gods" are adapted from a 1980 poem by Lina Kostenko; the lyrics to "When the Flame Turns to Ashes" are adapted from a 1908 poem by Oleksandr Oles; the lyrics to "Solitude" are once again taken from the 1839 work of Taras Shevchenko; and the lyrics to "Eternity" are lifted verbatim from the 1929 work of Yuriy Klen. Several tracks also sample the Ukrainian poetic film Mamay (2003), and for this reason Blood in Our Wells has been described as "more cinematic" than its predecessors. The inlay cover of the CD edition contains the text of a 1957 patriotic poem of Ukrainian poet Vasyl Symonenko. The album cover is a painting by Vasily Perov named "Seeing Off The Dead Man".

Blood in our Wells was released in two non-vinyl formats: normal jewel case (unlimited and available everywhere), and super jewel case plus (limited to 1000 hand-numbered copies and made available only through Supernal Music). It was the first Drudkh record to appear in Terrorizer Top 40 year list, achieving the 35th position. In 2010, it was re-released as a digipak with new artwork via Season of Mist.

In 2013, Decibel ranked Blood in Our Wells at number 35 on its list of the Top 100 Black Metal Albums of All Time.

== Track listing ==
Professional ratings
Review scores
Source	Rating
Chronicles of Chaos (webzine)	9/10

No.	Title	Length
1.	"Навь (Nav')"	2:25
2.	"Борозни богів (Furrows of Gods)"	8:57
3.	"Коли пломінь перетворюється на попіл (When the Flame Turns to Ashes)"	10:37
4.	"Самітність (Solitude)"	12:24
5.	"Вічність (Eternity)"	10:38
6.	"Українська повстанська армія (Ukrainian Insurgent Army)"	5:02
Total length:		50:03
