= Chris Friel =

Chris Friel may refer to:

- Chris Friel (politician), politician in the Canadian province of Ontario
- Chris Friel (photographer) (born 1959), British photographer
