= De occulta philosophia =

De occulta philosophia may refer to:

- Three Books of Occult Philosophy, a 1531 book by Heinrich Cornelius Agrippa
- De occulta philosophia (album), a 2007 album by Blood of Kingu
