= Slavonic Chronicles =

EP by Drudkh
- Released: September 20, 2010
- Genre: Black metal
- Length: 16:05
- Label: Season of Mist

Drudkh chronology
Microcosmos (2009)	Slavonic Chronicles (2010)	Handful of Stars (2010)

Slavonic Chronicles is an EP released by Ukrainian black metal band Drudkh on September 20, 2010 (see 2010 in music), on the French label Season of Mist. It was released in two formats: as a 10" LP and as a mini CD. The last one is available only as a part of a deluxe leather book edition of Drudkh's 2010 full-length album, Handful of Stars, strictly limited to 600 copies.

Slavonic Chronicles consists of two cover versions of tracks by Slavic black metal bands: "Tam gdzie gaśnie dzień..." (originally by the Polish band Sacrilegium, taken from a split with Polish band North, titled Jesienne Szepty) and "Indiánská píseň hrůzy" (originally by Czech band Master's Hammer, taken from the album Šlágry). It was generally well received due to its stylistic similarity with classic Drudkh works like Blood in Our Wells, as opposed to the almost post-rock sound of Handful of Stars.

The Sacrilegium cover was dedicated "to our Polish brothers fallen in September 1939", and because the group was unsuccessful in contacting Sacrilegium for the song's lyrics, the lyrics in the Drudkh version come from the Ukrainian poet Vadym Lesych (1909–1982).

== Track listing ==
No.	Title	Length
1.	"Tam gdzie gaśnie dzień..."	10:48
2.	"Indiánská píseň hrůzy"	5:17
Total length:		16:05

== Personnel ==
- Roman (Roman Saenko, Роман Саєнко) – guitars
- Thurios (Roman Blahykh, Роман Благих) – vocals, guitars
- Krechet – bass
- Vlad – drums, keyboards
