= De occulta philosophia (album) =

Studio album by Blood of Kingu
- Released: 7 December 2007
- Genre: Black metal
- Label: Supernal Music, Debemur Morti

Blood of Kingu chronology
De occulta philosophia (2007)	Sun in the House of the Scorpion (2010)

Alternative cover
- Alternative artwork with the new record label, Debemur Morti Productions

De occulta philosophia is the debut album by Ukrainian black metal band Blood of Kingu. Originally released under Supernal Music, the band has since signed to Debemur Morti Productions and re-released the album with new artwork and packaging on August 28, 2009. Musically, the album contains fast tempos, and the vocals mainly consists of tibetan chants.

== Track listing ==
1. "Indoarika Incognita" – 1:10
2. "Your Blood, Nubia! Your Power, Egypt!" – 4:28
3. "Mummu Tiamat" – 4:00
4. "Stronghold of Megaliths, Thorns and Human Bones" – 4:35
5. "Slaughter of Shudras" – 0:44
6. "Lair of Night Abzu" – 5:27
7. "Black Spectral Wings of Shaman" – 4:45
8. "Vajtarani" – 0:14
9. "Chambers of Inpu-Su" – 3:03

== Personnel ==
- Roman Saenko – Vocals & All Instruments

=== Session member ===
- Yuriy Sinitsky - Drums
