= Ariettes oubliées... =

2012 album by Les Discrets

Studio album by Les Discrets
- Released: 10 February 2012
- Recorded: January–November 2011
- Studio: Drudenhaus Studio, Issé, France
- Genre: Post-metal, post-rock, shoegaze
- Length: 42:46
- Language: French
- Label: Prophecy Productions
- Producer: Martin Koller for Prophecy Productions

Les Discrets chronology
Les Discrets / Arctic Plateau (2011)	Ariettes oubliées... (2012)	Live at Roadburn (2015)

Professional ratings
Review scores
Source	Rating
Pitchfork	6.5/10
Spin	6/10
Sputnikmusic	3/5 stars

Ariettes oubliées... (Forgotten Arias...) is the second full-length album by Les Discrets, released in 2012 by Prophecy Productions. "Ariettes oubliées... I: Je Devine à travers un murmure..." was released as a music video directed by Audrey Hadorn.

== Musical style ==
Ariettes oubliées... is categorised as a post-metal, shoegaze and post-rock record with elements of gothic pop and black metal. The mood of the album ranges from bright and hopeful to mysterious and bleak, emphasizing delicacy, restraint, and atmosphere over aggression or shock.

Compared to the band's debut album, Septembre et ses dernières pensées (2010), Ariettes oubliées... presents a denser and more cohesive sound. According to the frontman Fursy Teyssier, the songwriting process was more focused and spontaneous, with a clearer understanding of the desired atmosphere and concept. While the debut album was composed over the course of seven years, Ariettes oubliées... was written in two, resulting in a more polished and consistent output. Nevertheless, the reviewer of Sputnikmusic viewed the album as more reserved and less dynamic than its predecessor, with a perceived lack of "exhilarating details" and a reduced emphasis on metal influences.

Instrumentation on the album includes a prominent use of acoustic guitar, which interacts with electric guitar textures to create a contrast between warmth and coldness. The ebow was used on "La Traversée" to produce an otherworldly quality, though Teyssier noted its potential to detract from musical personality if overused. Vocal performances are understated, with Teyssier's voice mixed low and blurred into the instrumentation. He described his vocal style as expressive rather than conventionally beautiful, intended to convey meaning rather than dominate the soundscape. Audrey Hadorn contributed with the breathy, poetic vocals, and drummer Winterhalter's performance was praised for its nuance, though Teyssier expressed some dissatisfaction with the drum mix due to technical issues during tracking.

== Track listing ==
All lyrics are written by Audrey Hadorn except track 4 by Paul Verlaine and track 5 by Fursy Teyssier; all music is composed by les Discrets except track 5 by Neb Xort.

No.	Title	Length
1.	"Linceul d’hiver (Winter Shroud)"	2:50
2.	"La Traversée (The Crossing)"	8:23
3.	"Le Mouvement perpétuel (The Perpetual Motion)"	6:55
4.	"Ariettes oubliées... I: Je devine à travers un murmure... (Forgotten Arias... I: I Understand Through a Whisper...)"	5:31
5.	"La Nuit muette (The Mute Night)"	5:49
6.	"Au creux de l'hiver (In the Middle of Winter)"	4:36
7.	"Après l'ombre (After the Shadow)"	4:33
8.	"Les Regrets (The Regrets)"	4:09

Limited/Artbook edition bonus tracks
No.	Title	Length
1.	"Le Souffle froid (The Cold Breath)"	1:49
2.	"Ariettes oubliées... II: Il Pleure dans mon cœur... (Forgotten Arias... II: He Cries in My Heart...)"	3:04
3.	"L'Échappée (The Breakaway)" (Acoustic version)	4:15

== Personnel ==
Les Discrets

- Fursy Teyssier – lead vocals, guitars, bass, artwork
- Winterhalter – drums
- Audrey Hadorn – spoken vocals

Additional musicians

- Gianluca Divirgilio (Arctic Plateau) – vocals in "Ariettes oubliées... II: Il Pleure dans mon cœur..."
