= A Handful of Stars =

A Handful of Stars may refer to:

- A Handful of Stars, a play by Billy Roche, part of The Wexford Trilogy
- "A Handful of Stars", a popular song by Jack Lawrence, recorded by Johnny Mathis and others
- A Handful of Stars, a 2005 album by jazz musician Aaron Weinstein

== See also ==
- Handful of Stars, a 2010 album by Ukrainian black metal band Drudkh
