= La Sanie des siècles – Panégyrique de la dégénérescence =

Studio album by Peste Noire
- Released: August 2, 2006
- Genre: Black metal
- Length: 51:57
- Label: De Profundis

Peste Noire chronology
La Sanie des siècles – Panégyrique de la dégénérescence (2006)	Lorraine Rehearsal (2007)

La Sanie des siècles – Panégyrique de la dégénérescence (which roughly translates as "The Sanies of the Centuries – Ode to Degeneration", "sanies" being "a thin greenish foul-smelling discharge from a wound, ulcer, etc., containing pus and blood" according to the Collins English Dictionary) is the debut album by French black metal band Peste Noire.

In 2013, Decibel ranked La Sanie des siècles – Panégyrique de la dégénérescence at number 93 on its list of the Top 100 Black Metal Albums of All Time.

== Background ==
The majority of the album is based on tracks which were previously featured on Peste Noire demos (all written and recorded by La sale Famine de Valfunde on his own equipment). For La Sanie des siècles – Panégyrique de la dégénérescence these demo tracks were rerecorded in Rosenkrantz studio with a full line-up (Indria as bassist and Winterhalter as drummer) Famine had recruited.

This album still features the same raw sound of Peste Noire's demos, but was substantially cleaned up in terms of listenability. The music still falls into the category of black metal, but manages to go above and beyond this label through sprawling tracks that maintain their momentum over the course of 5 to 11 minutes. Famine also used a lot of samples in his music – taken from a variety of sources – in order to construct the twisted, mysterious atmosphere that the final product holds. Also still in place is Famine's guitar work. Neige, who was PN's session drummer on the demos, was no longer a member of Peste Noire when La Sanie des siècles was recorded, however he was featured on "Nous sommes fanés" and "Des médecins malades et des saints séquestrés" as a session drummer (only), because these two songs are tracks from previous demos which were not rerecorded in the studio session for La Sanie des siècles.

Famine clarified things when he stated: "The most absurd idea spread by idiots is that La Sanie des siècles is better because Neige was more involved in its recording and production, yet the fact is that the album was recorded without Neige, in 2005, when I had kicked him out of the band. Neige never had any influence on my music in the slightest way possible; I write everything and I tell people what they must do over MY riffs. This was exactly what happened with Neige, ask him! [...] To claim that Neige is an important figure in PN is the same as saying that the person who plays the triangle in SOPOR AETERNUS AND THE ENSEMBLE OF SHADOWS is the main man in SOPOR."

PN plays a guitar-based style of black metal, which incorporates highly varied songwriting. The riffing and leads have a melodic tinge to them and there is an underlying dark, melancholic feel throughout the album. Due to its incorporation of organ, folk-based guitars, unusual riffs, guitar solos and the use of multiple different types of black metal vocals, La Sanie des siècles – Panégyrique de la dégénérescence received much critical acclaim from both fans and press alike.

Their concept of "turning mud into gold" is showcased in Famine's interview featured in the album's booklet and is materialized by the musicianship of Famine (guitars), Winterhalter (drums), and Indria (bass). In this French-language interview, Famine says Black Metal is all about turning the ugly, the disgusting and the horrible into something beautiful. The 2007 follow-up album Folkfuck Folie will show the consolidation and the deepening of this concept.

According to Famine, the overall themes running through La Sanie des siècles are "a parallel between mediaeval and modern apocalypse; the decline of the current world and the desire to see it die out since it cannot be saved; vengeance and the fantasized return of our Own (our Own: a fallen nobility socially, psychically and physiologically humiliated). Annihilating the world which has annihilated us. It invites people to do so."

All the songs, lyrics and solos on La Sanie des siècles – Panégyrique de la dégénérescence were written by La sale Famine de Valfunde exclusively except lyrics of "Le mort joyeux" and "Spleen" by Charles Baudelaire and "Dueil Angoisseus" by Christine de Pizan. All artwork and concept imagined by La sale Famine de Valfunde.

=== Sales and releases ===
This record was limited to 2,000 pieces during its first cycle of pressing but quickly sold-out due to the growth in the band's fanbase, in 2008 it was repressed by Transcendental Creations.

A limited vinyl version co-produced by De profundis éditions and Finnish label Ahdistuksen Aihio Productions was released in August 2009.

== Track listing ==
No.	Title	Length
1.	"Nous sommes fanés" (We Are Withered)	02:18
2.	"Le mort joyeux" (The Joyful Dead)	04:40
3.	"Laus tibi domine" (Praise to Thee, O Lord!)	06:57
4.	"Spleen"	05:47
5.	"Phalènes et pestilence – Salvatrice averse" (Moths and Pestilence - Redemptive Storm)	11:46
6.	"Retour de flamme (Hooligan Black Metal)" (Backlash (Hooligan Black Metal))	04:18
7.	"Dueil angoisseus (Christine de Pisan, 1362–1431)" (Anguished Grief)	07:02
8.	"Des médecins malades et des saints séquestrés" (Sick Doctors and Captive Saints)	09:09

== Credits ==
La Sanie des siècles – Panégyrique de la dégénérescence studio session:

- La Sale Famine de Valfunde – guitars, vocals, bass (on "Phalènes et pestilence – Salvatrice averse"), all songs, solos, lyrics (except lyrics taken from Baudelaire and Christine de Pisan)
- Indria – bass
- Winterhalter – drums

On bonus demo tracks:

- Neige – organ and drums (on "Nous sommes fanés" and "Des médecins malades et des saints séquestrés"), short guest vocal appearance (on tracks "Retour de flamme (Hooligan Black Metal)" and "Dueil angoisseus"), bass (on "Des médecins malades et des saints séquestrés")
