= Audrey Sylvain =

- Born: Audrey Sylvain
- Genres: Shoegazing, post-punk, black metal
- Occupations: Musician, singer, dancer
- Instruments: Piano, bass guitar, vocals
- Years active: 2000-present
- Labels: Code666; Profound Lore; De Profundis

Audrey Sylvain (born 26 June 1984) is a French singer and dancer, originally from Avignon. Her first band was Amesoeurs. She also sang on Alcest's debut album. She was a full-time member in Peste Noire until her departure in 2016. In 2019 Audrey Sylvain released Incandescente — the debut EP of her solo project Malenuit.

== Discography ==
=== With Amesoeurs ===
- Ruines Humaines - EP, 2006
- Valfunde/Amesoeurs - Split album, 2007
- Amesoeurs - Full-length, 2009

=== With Peste Noire ===
- Folkfuck Folie album - 2007
- Ballade cuntre lo Anemi francor album - 2009
- L'Ordure à l'état Pur album - 2011
- Peste Noire album - 2013
- La Chaise-Dyable album - 2015

=== Horns Emerging ===
- Horns Emerging - Spleen 2012

=== Guest Vocals for Alcest ===
- Souvenirs d'un autre monde - 2007

=== Guest Vocals for Germ ===
- Audrey appears on the songs Butterfly and Blue as the Sky, Powerful as the Waves from the 2013 album Grief

=== Malenuit (Solo Project) ===
- Incandescente - EP, 2019
