= Blood of Kingu =

Ukrainian extreme metal band

- Origin: Kharkiv, Ukraine
- Genres: Black metal, death metal
- Years active: 2005–2016
- Labels: Candlelight, Supernal Music, Debemur Morti, Season of Mist
- Members: Roman Saenko; Thurios; Krechet; Yuriy Sinitsky
- Website: www.myspace.com/bloodofkinguband

Blood of Kingu was a black metal band from Ukraine formed in 2005 by Roman Saenko, the main member of Drudkh, Dark Ages and Hate Forest.

Lyrically, Blood of Kingu deals with Sumerian/Ancient Egyptian and Indo-European mythology and history. The vocals include death growls as well as Tibetan chants..

On 7 December 2007, they released their first album, De occulta philosophia. It was re-released with alternate layout and packaging.

Their second album, Sun in the House of the Scorpion, was recorded in the autumn of 2009 and released on 24 May 2010 by Candlelight Records.

On mid-2016, Blood of Kingu had announced on their Facebook page that the band has ended. After that, Roman Saenko has started another new Black metal band called "Windswept" which its debut album will be released in March 2017 with its first track "Blinding and Bottomless abyss is howling". Its lyrical inspiration is mostly from nature, similar to Drudkh

== Discography ==
- De occulta philosophia – 2007
- Sun in the House of the Scorpion – 2010
- Dark Star on the Right Horn of the Crescent Moon – 2014

== Final line-up ==
- Roman Saenko – vocals, guitar, keyboards (2005–2016)
- Thurios – guitar (2007–2016)
- Krechet – bass (2007–2016)
- Yuriy Sinitsky – drums (2007–2016)
- Vlad – keyboards (2014–2016)
