= Purity (album) =

Studio album by Hate Forest
- Released: 2003
- Recorded: Spring 2002
- Genre: Black metal, dark ambient
- Length: 44:33
- Label: Slavonic Metal; Supernal Music; Osmose Productions
- Producer: Hate Forest

Hate Forest chronology
The Most Ancient Ones (2001)	Purity (2003)	Battlefields (2003)

Purity is the second album by Ukrainian black metal band Hate Forest, released in 2003.

== Track listing ==
Professional ratings
Review scores
Source	Rating
Chronicles of Chaos (webzine)	8/10
Sputnikmusic	3.5/5

No.	Title	Length
1.	"Domination"	05:54
2.	"Elder Race"	05:23
3.	"The Gates"	11:03
4.	"Megaliths"	02:33
5.	"The Immortal Ones"	11:24
6.	"Desert of Ice"	06:06
7.	"Cromlech"	02:10
Total length:		44:33
