= Songs of Grief and Solitude =

Songs of Grief and Solitude Пісні Скорботи і Самітності

Studio album by Drudkh
- Released: December 4, 2006
- Genre: Folk, ambient
- Length: 36:00
- Label: Supernal Music

Drudkh chronology
Blood in Our Wells (2006)	Songs of Grief and Solitude; Пісні Скорботи і Самітності (2006)	Anti-Urban (2007)

Songs of Grief and Solitude (Ukrainian: Пісні Скорботи і Самітності, romanized: Pisni skorboty i samitnosti), is the fifth album by Ukrainian black metal band Drudkh, released in 2006. It marks a radical departure from previous Drudkh works in that all songs are entirely acoustic, arranged in the manner of traditional Ukrainian folk. Several songs contain elements of previous Drudkh material: "Tears of Gods" contains elements of "Fate", "The Milky Way" is a rearranged version of "Blood" and "Archaic Dance" references "Glare of 1768", all three of which originally appeared on The Swan Road. "Why the Sun Becomes Sad" contains elements of "Sunwheel" from Autumn Aurora, and "The Cranes Will Never Return Here" is an acoustic rendition of the opening riff from the Blood in Our Wells track "Solitude".

In 2010, it was re-released as digipak by Season of Mist.

== Track listing ==
No.	Title	Length
1.	"Захід сонця в Карпатах (Sunset in Carpathians)"	2:47
2.	"Сльози богів (Tears of Gods)"	8:34
3.	"Стародавній танець (Archaic Dance)"	3:28
4.	"Чумацький шлях (The Milky Way)"	9:52
5.	"Чому буває сумне сонце (Why the Sun Becomes Sad)"	5:45
6.	"Журавлі ніколи не повернуться сюди (The Cranes Will Never Return Here)"	3:26
7.	"Сивий степ (Grey-Haired Steppe)"	2:08
Total length:		36:00
