= Eternal Turn of the Wheel =

Studio album by Drudkh
- Released: February 24, 2012
- Recorded: Summer to Autumn 2011, Viter Music; Kharkiv, Ukraine
- Genre: Black metal
- Length: 37:14
- Label: Season of Mist

Drudkh chronology
Handful of Stars (2010)	Eternal Turn of the Wheel (2012)	A Furrow Cut Short (2015)

Professional ratings
Review scores
Source	Rating
About.com	4/5 stars
Pitchfork Media	(8.2/10)
Sputnikmusic	(3.5/5)

Eternal Turn of the Wheel (Ukrainian: Вічний оберт колеса, Vichnyy obert kolesa) is the ninth studio album by Ukrainian black metal band Drudkh, released on February 24 (March 13 in the USA), 2012, through Season of Mist's Underground Activists label.

== Track listing ==
No.	Title	Length
1.	"Вічне коло [Eternal Circle]"	1:17
2.	"Подих холодної чорної землі (березень) [Breath of Cold Black Soil (March)]"	10:04
3.	"Коли боги залишають свої смарагдові чертоги (серпень) [When Gods Leave Their Emerald Halls (August)]"	9:39
4.	"Прощання зі скорботними птахами осені (жовтень) [Farewell to Autumn's Sorrowful Birds (October)]"	8:02
5.	"Ніч зіткана зі снігу, вітрів та сивих зірок (грудень) [Night Woven of Snow, Winds and Grey-haired Stars (December)]"	8:12
Total length:		37:14

== Personnel ==
- Thurios – vocals, keyboards
- Roman Saenko – guitars, bass
- Krechet – bass, keyboards
- Vlad – drums, keyboards
