= A Furrow Cut Short =

Studio album by Drudkh
- Released: April 20, 2015
- Genre: Black metal
- Length: 58:50
- Label: Season of Mist

Drudkh chronology
Eternal Turn of the Wheel (2012)	A Furrow Cut Short (2015)	They Often See Dreams About the Spring (2018)

A Furrow Cut Short (Ukrainian: Борозна обірвалася, romanized: Borozna obirvalasya) is the tenth album by Ukrainian black metal band Drudkh, released April 20, 2015, on Season of Mist's Underground Activists label. It is the band's longest recording to date and the first to receive a vinyl release on two LPs.

== Track listing ==
No.	Title	Length
1.	"Прокляті сини I" (Cursed Sons I)	9:20
2.	"Прокляті сини II" (Cursed Sons II)	7:05
3.	"Епосі нескорених поетів" (To the Epoch of Unbowed Poets)	9:00
4.	"Тліючий попіл" (Embers)	6:27
5.	"Безчестя I" (Dishonour I)	9:11
6.	"Безчестя II" (Dishonour II)	9:22
7.	"Поки не засиплють чужою землею очі" (Till Foreign Ground Shall Cover Eyes)	8:25
Total length:		58:50

== Critical reception ==
Professional ratings
Review scores
Source	Rating
About.com	4/5 stars
PopMatters	6/10
Sputnikmusic	2.0/5
Metal Storm	7.5/10

A Furrow Cut Short received mixed reviews from critics.

Dave Schalek from About.com rated the album 4 out of 5 and said that "a Furrow Cut Short is an excellent introduction to Drudkh for listeners unfamiliar with the band and is, by any measure, an excellent album."

Benjamin Hedge Olson from PopMatters said that the album is "another predictable yet satisfying slab of black metal", rating it 6 out of 10.

Kyle Ward from Sputnikmusic was more negative about the release, rated it 2 out of 5 and "was not pleased that a leader of that scene devolved into run-of-the-mill black metal."

== Personnel ==
- Thurios – vocals, keyboards
- Roman Saenko – guitars, bass
- Krechet – bass, keyboards
- Vlad – drums, keyboards
