= Sun in the House of the Scorpion =

Studio album by Blood of Kingu
- Released: May 24, 2010
- Genre: Black metal
- Length: 36:26
- Label: Candlelight Records

Blood of Kingu chronology
De occulta philosophia (2007)	Sun in the House of the Scorpion (2010)	Dark Star on the Right Horn of the Crescent Moon (2014)

Sun in the House of the Scorpion is the second album by Ukrainian black metal band Blood of Kingu. It was released under Candlelight Records on May 24, 2010. The album marks the beginning of the use of death growls, which does not exist in the previous album. The cover painting is an untitled work from 1977 by Zdzislaw Beksinski.

== Artwork ==
Joe DiVita of Loudwire said of the album's cover artwork: "There’s nothing scarier than a man who looks like he’s lived too long. The hazy, gaunt, cane-wielding figure stands in front of a sickly greenish yellow sky with one hand resting steadily on what we can only imagine is a wolf. The sunken eyes and bony hands make this man appear as if he’s risen from the tomb to perpetually stalk these grounds with his beastly companion."

== Track listing ==
No.	Title	Length
1.	"Herald of the Aeon of Darkness"	0:55
2.	"Those that wander amidst the Stars"	4:20
3.	"Cyclopean Temples of the Old Ones"	4:25
4.	"Incantation of he who sleeps"	10:24
5.	"Guardians of Gateways to Outer Void"	5:47
6.	"Ceremonies to awake thy Ageless Hate"	3:57
7.	"Morbid Black Dreams Bringing Madness"	2:05
8.	"Gate Of Nanna" (Beherit Cover)	4:33
