= Autumn Aurora =

Studio album by Drudkh
- Released: November 28, 2004
- Recorded: Winter 2003
- Genre: Atmospheric black metal
- Length: 40:17
- Label: Supernal Music

Drudkh chronology
Forgotten Legends (2003)	Autumn Aurora (2004)	The Swan Road (2005)

Autumn Aurora is the second album by Ukrainian black metal band Drudkh, released in 2004. It is the first Drudkh album to incorporate synthesizers and, as with its predecessor, its lyrics have never been released.

Some releases of Autumn Aurora have "Summoning the Rain" and "Glare of Autumn" combined as a single track. The album has been re-released on November 9, 2009, by Season of Mist, featuring a remastered sound and a new album artwork.

Autumn Aurora was a strong critical success, and was chosen as the best album of the year by Chronicles of Chaos web-zine.

Most releases of the album have the titles only in English, but the iTunes release uses both English and Ukrainian language titles.

== Track listing ==
No.	Title	Length
1.	"Завмирання (Fading)"	1:31
2.	"Закликаючи дощ (Summoning the Rain)"	5:41
3.	"Відблиски осені (Glare of Autumn)"	5:09
4.	"Сонячне коло (Sunwheel)"	8:47
5.	"Вітер нічних лісів (Wind of the Night Forests)"	9:59
6.	"Перший сніг (The First Snow)"	9:10
Total length:		40:17

== Personnel ==
- Roman Saenko – guitars, bass
- Thurios – vocals, keyboards
- Amorth – keyboards

=== Guest musicians ===
- Yuriy Sinitsky – drums
