= Les Discrets / Arctic Plateau =

EP by Les Discrets and Arctic Plateau
- Released: September 2, 2011
- Genre: Post-metal, post-rock, shoegaze
- Label: Prophecy Productions

Les Discrets chronology
Septembre et Ses Dernières Pensées (2010)	Les Discrets / Arctic Plateau (2011)	Ariettes oubliées... (2012)

Arctic Plateau chronology
On A Sad Sunny Day (2009)	Les Discrets / Arctic Plateau (2011)	The Enemy Inside (2012)

Les Discrets/Arctic Plateau is a split record by les Discrets and Arctic Plateau released in 2011, giving an insight in the artists upcoming releases, Ariettes oubliées... and The Enemy Inside respectively. The artwork was done by Les Discrets' Fursy Teyssier. Arctic Plateau's part also features the demos that led to their contract with Prophecy Records in 2008. "The Persuaders Theme" is a cover of the theme melody for the 1971 TV series the Persuaders!

== Track listing ==
Disc one, les Discrets

No.	Title	Length
1.	"Le Mouvement perpétuel"	6:59
2.	"The Persuaders Theme"	2:35

Disc two, Arctic Plateau

No.	Title	Length
1.	"Music's Like..."	5:52
2.	"Amethyst to #F (demo)"	7:27
3.	"Ivory (demo)"	5:28

== Personnel ==
Disc one

- Audrey Hadorn - vocals, lyrics
- Fursy Teyssier - guitars, bass, vocals, cover art
- Winterhalter - drums

Disc two

- Gianluca Divirgilio - Guitars, vocals, lyrics
- Fabio Fraschini - Electric bass
- Massimiliano Chiapperi - Drums
