= Les Discrets =

French post-rock band

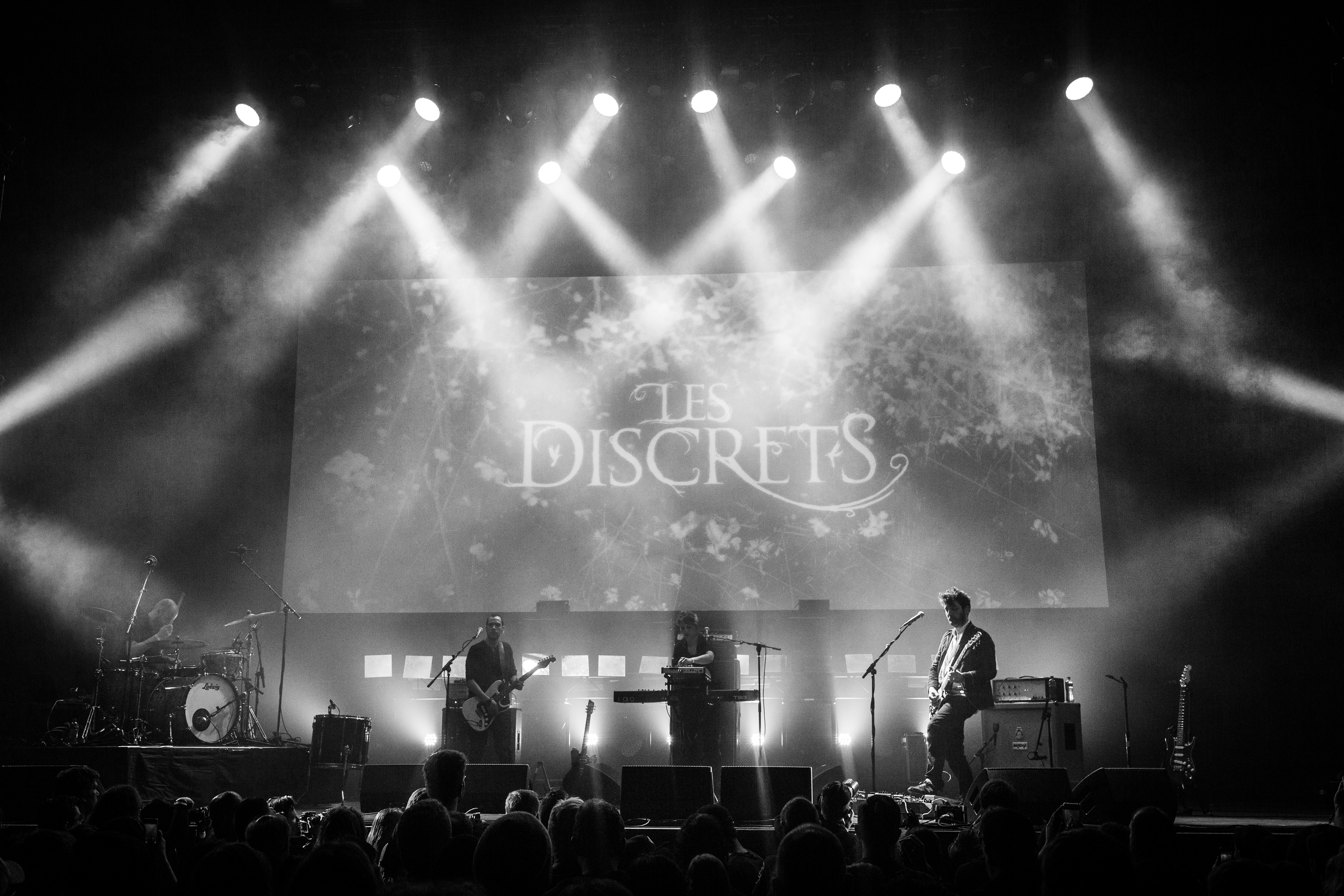
- Les Discrets at Roadburn Festival, 2017.

Background information
- Origin: France
- Genres: Post-rock, post-metal, shoegaze, blackgaze, indie rock, trip hop
- Years active: 2003–present
- Label: Prophecy Productions
- Members: Fursy Teyssier; Audrey Hadorn
- Past members: Winterhalter
- Website: Les Discrets / Fursy Teyssier official website

Les Discrets is a French post-rock band created and led by Fursy Teyssier as a "platform gathering music and art." Teyssier was the sole member of the band until 2009, when he was joined by Audrey Hadorn and Winterhalter. Les Discrets released Septembre et Ses Dernières Pensées in March 2010, Ariettes oubliées... in February 2012. Winterhalter left the band in 2013 to focus on his duties for Alcest. The band's third album Prédateurs, was released in April 2017, which saw a transition towards an indie rock and trip hop-oriented sound.

The band considers its name to mean "Those who keep silent", although "The Discreet Ones" would be a more accurate translation.

== History ==
Les Discrets was formed in 2003 as a musical side-project alongside Fursy's other band Phest. Fursy, who is also an illustrator and film director, wanted to express concepts in music similar to those found within his art. Fellow French musicians, Winterhalter and Audrey Hadorn, soon joined the line-up. Les Discrets signed a five-album contract with German record label Prophecy Productions in April, 2009. The band released a split EP with Alcest in December of the same year, and went on to release their first full-length album, Septembre et Ses Dernières Pensées, in March, 2010. According to the German Sonic Seducer magazine, the album features dark, romantic music that cannot be attributed to any single genre. On July 18, 2010, Fursy posted an update on the band's website stating that composition for the second album had been completed, and that the studio had already been booked for its recording.

Both Fursy and Winterhalter were members of the now-disbanded Amesoeurs. Fursy was a live member of Alcest until June 2010, while Winterhalter is the band's full-time drummer.

In 2013, Fursy announced that, by mutual decision, both Winterhalter and live bassist Neige were leaving Les Discrets to focus more on their main band, Alcest.

The band's third studio album, Prédateurs, was released on Bandcamp on April 21, 2017.

In an Instagram post at September 12, 2022, Fursy said that the absence of new material was due to his full-time work as a film animator. He said that he was open to doing another album "...when inspiration fully comes back." However, he also said that Les Discrets would most likely not perform live again because he does not enjoy reproducing the music in a live setting.

== Band members ==
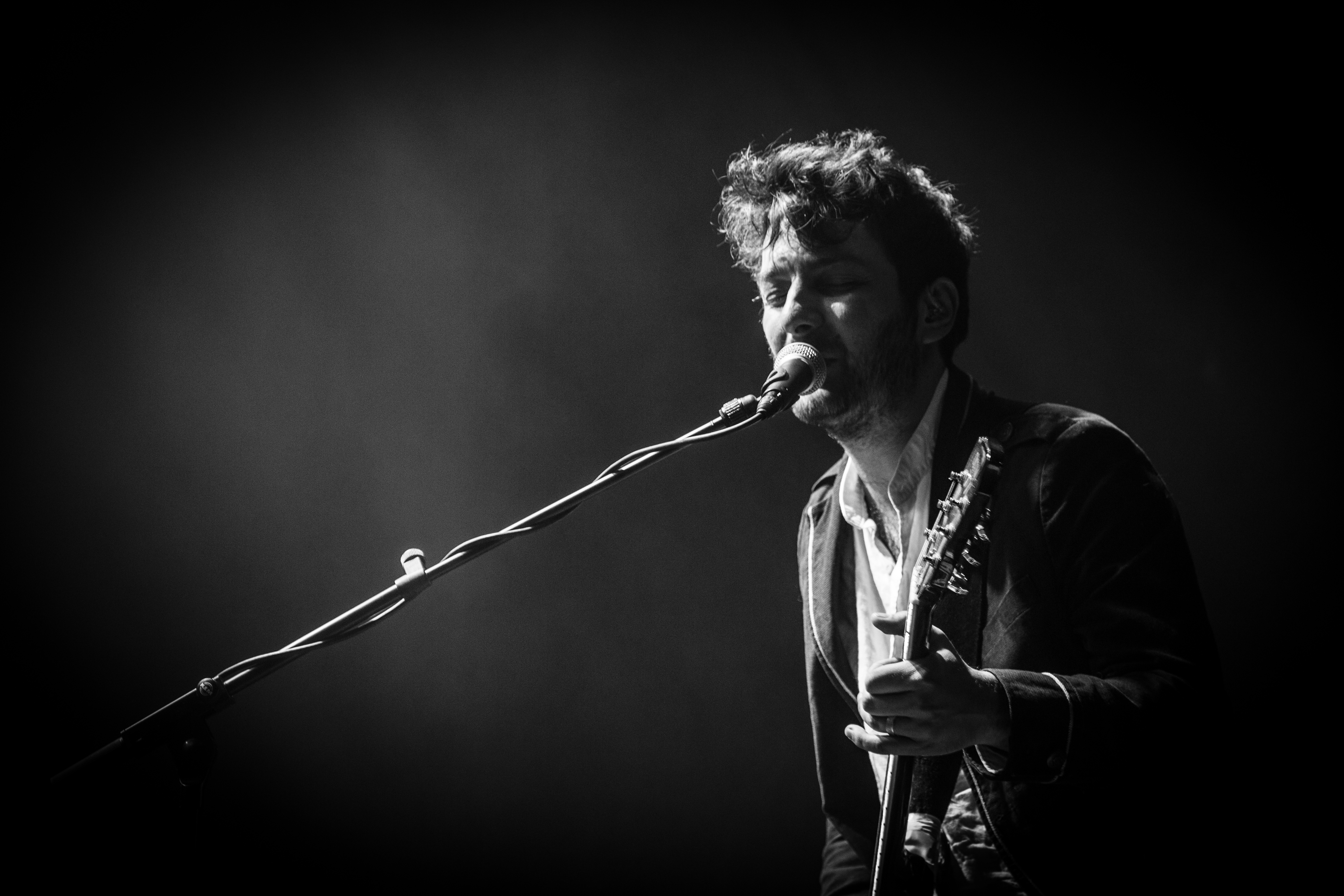
Fursy Teyssier at Roadburn Festival 2017

Current

- Fursy Teyssier – lead vocals, guitars, bass (2003–present), keyboards (2011-present)
- Audrey Hadorn – vocals (2009–present), keyboards (2016–present)

Former

- Winterhalter – drums (2009–2013)

Former live

- Neige – bass (2011–2013)
- Zero – guitars, backing vocals (2011–2013)
- Jean Joly – drums (2016–2017)
- Miguel – guitar (2016–2017)
- Brice – bass (2016–2017)

== Discography ==
Studio albums

- Septembre et ses dernières pensées (March 2010)
- Ariettes oubliées... (February 2012)
- Prédateurs (April 2017)

Live albums

- Live at Roadburn (June 2015)

Split releases

- Les Discrets / Alcest with Alcest (November 2009)
- Les Discrets / Arctic Plateau with Arctic Plateau (September 2011)

Extended plays

- Les Discrets (2006)
- Viree Nocturne (August 2016)
- Rue Octavio Mey / Fleur Des Murailles (April 2017)

Compilation appearances

- Whom the Moon a Nightsong Sings (October 2010)
