= L'Ordure à l'état Pur =

Studio album by Peste Noire
- Released: 2011
- Genre: Avant-garde black metal; folk black metal
- Length: 60:23
- Label: La Mesnie Herlequin

Peste Noire chronology
Ballade cuntre lo Anemi francor (2009)	L'Ordure à l'état Pur (2011)	Peste Noire (2013)

L'Ordure à l'état Pur (French for The Pure Essence of Garbage) is the fourth full-length studio album by the French black metal band Peste Noire. It was released in 2011 on the Compact Disc format under bandleader Ludovic "Famine" Faure's own record label: La Mesnie Herlequin, which he established that same year.

== Style ==
Although fundamentally a black metal record at its core, L'Ordure à l'état Pur exhibits prominent French folk music, avant-garde, and industrial elements mixed in with traces of ska punk, post-metal, and electronia. Moreover, the album features the playing of instruments that are seldom used in black metal music including the trombone, accordion, timpani, cello and épinette des Vosges.

In addition to the name of the album itself, its song titles and lyrics are entirely written/sung in the French language – maintaining a consistency with the band's other releases.

== Track listing ==
No.	Title	English translation	Length
1.	"Casse, Pêches, Fractures et Traditions"	Breaking, Punches, Bone fractures and Traditions	10:48
2.	"Cochon Carotte et les sœurs Crotte"	Pig, Carrots and the Turd Sisters	8:28
3.	"J’avais rêvé du Nord"	I Had Dreamt of the North	20:26
4.	"Sale Famine von Valfoutre"	Sale Famine von Valfuck	11:32
5.	"La condi hu"	The Human Condition	9:09
Total length:			60:23

== Personnel ==
=== Peste Noire ===
- DJ Famine (Ludovic Faure) – vocals, acoustic guitar, lead guitar, rhythm guitar, Epinette des Vosges, production
- Vicomte Chtedire de Kroumpadis – drums, percussion
- Audrey Sylvain – clean vocals

=== Session musicians ===
- Indria – bass guitar, fretless bass
- L'Atrabilaire Maldo – Occitan preaches (track 1)
- Seigneur Arawn – vocals (track 3)
- Lulu l'ermite – backing vocals (track 3, 4)
- Miss Peste Nègre – accordion
- Rachid de France – trombone

=== Additional personnel ===
- Engwar – engineering, mixing, cello, timpani and backing vocals (track 5)
- Mika Jussila – mastering
- Valnègre (Jean-Emmanuel Simoulin) – artwork and photography
