= Amesoeurs (album) =

2009 studio album by Amesoeurs

Studio album by Amesoeurs
- Released: March 10, 2009
- Recorded: Klangschmiede Studio E (2008–2009)
- Genres: Post-black metal, post-punk, shoegaze
- Length: 58:23
- Labels: Code 666; Northern Silence; Profound Lore

Amesoeurs chronology
Valfunde / Amesoeurs (2007)	Amesoeurs (2009)

Professional ratings
Review scores
Source	Rating
AllMusic	3/5 stars
Pitchfork	7.0/10

Amesoeurs (/ɑmsœʁ/, French: "Soulmates") is the only full-length album by Amesoeurs. It was released in 2009, just before the band broke up. Northern Silence Productions released a special limited LP edition of the album in three different versions: the "Metallic Century" edition, limited to 333 copies, the "Cold Light" edition limited to 333 copies, and the "Night Sky" edition limited to 222 copies, which all come with an exclusive bonus track "Gas in Veins - demo version".

== Track listing ==
All tracks are written by Neige, except where noted.

No.	Title	Lyrics	Music	Length
1.	"Gas in Veins"		Fursy Teyssier	5:10
2.	"Les Ruches malades" ("The Sick Hives")			4:19
3.	"Heurt" ("Quarrel")	Audrey Sylvain		6:01
4.	"Recueillement" ("Contemplation")	Charles Baudelaire		7:01
5.	"Faux Semblants" ("False Pretenses")	Sylvain		4:21
6.	"I XIII V XIX XV V XXI XVIII XIX – IX XIX – IV V I IV" ("Amesoeurs – Is – Dead" in transliterated Roman numerals)		Sylvain	1:41
7.	"Trouble (Éveils infâmes)" ("Trouble (Abject Awakenings)")			4:49
8.	"Video Girl"			4:11
9.	"La Reine trayeuse" ("The Milking Queen")	Sylvain	Teyssier	5:32
10.	"Amesoeurs" ("Soulmates")			4:03
11.	"Au crépuscule de nos rêves" ("At the Twilight of Our Dreams", hidden track starts at 8:54)			11:17

== Personnel ==
Amesoeurs

- Neige – lead vocals, guitar, bass, synths
- Fursy Teyssier – guitar, bass
- Audrey Sylvain – clean vocals, piano
- Winterhalter – drums

Production

- Markus Stock – recording
