= Dark Star on the Right Horn of the Crescent Moon =

Studio album by Blood of Kingu
- Released: August 28, 2014
- Genre: Black metal, death metal
- Length: 40:44
- Label: Season of Mist

Blood of Kingu chronology
Sun in the House of the Scorpion (2010)	Dark Star on the Right Horn of the Crescent Moon (2014)

Dark Star on the Right Horn of the Crescent Moon is the third and final studio album by Ukrainian black metal band Blood of Kingu. It was released on August 28, 2014, under Season of Mist.

== Track listing ==
No.	Title	Length
1.	"Crowned Scarlet Moon Is Waiting for Eclipse"	5:28
2.	"He Who Is Not to Be Named"	5:38
3.	"Mother Hydra"	5:21
4.	"Enshrined in the Nethermost Lairs Beneath the Oceans"	6:34
5.	"Red Star on the Path of Ea"	0:49
6.	"Sigil of the Watcher"	5:31
7.	"Prayer to the Gods of Night"	1:52
8.	"The Bringer of Pestilence"	4:24
9.	"The Cycle Returneth"	5:07
