= Doug Chinnery =

British photographer

Doug Chinnery was born in London, England, in 1964 and after he spent part of his childhood in Western Australia he grew up in Essex.

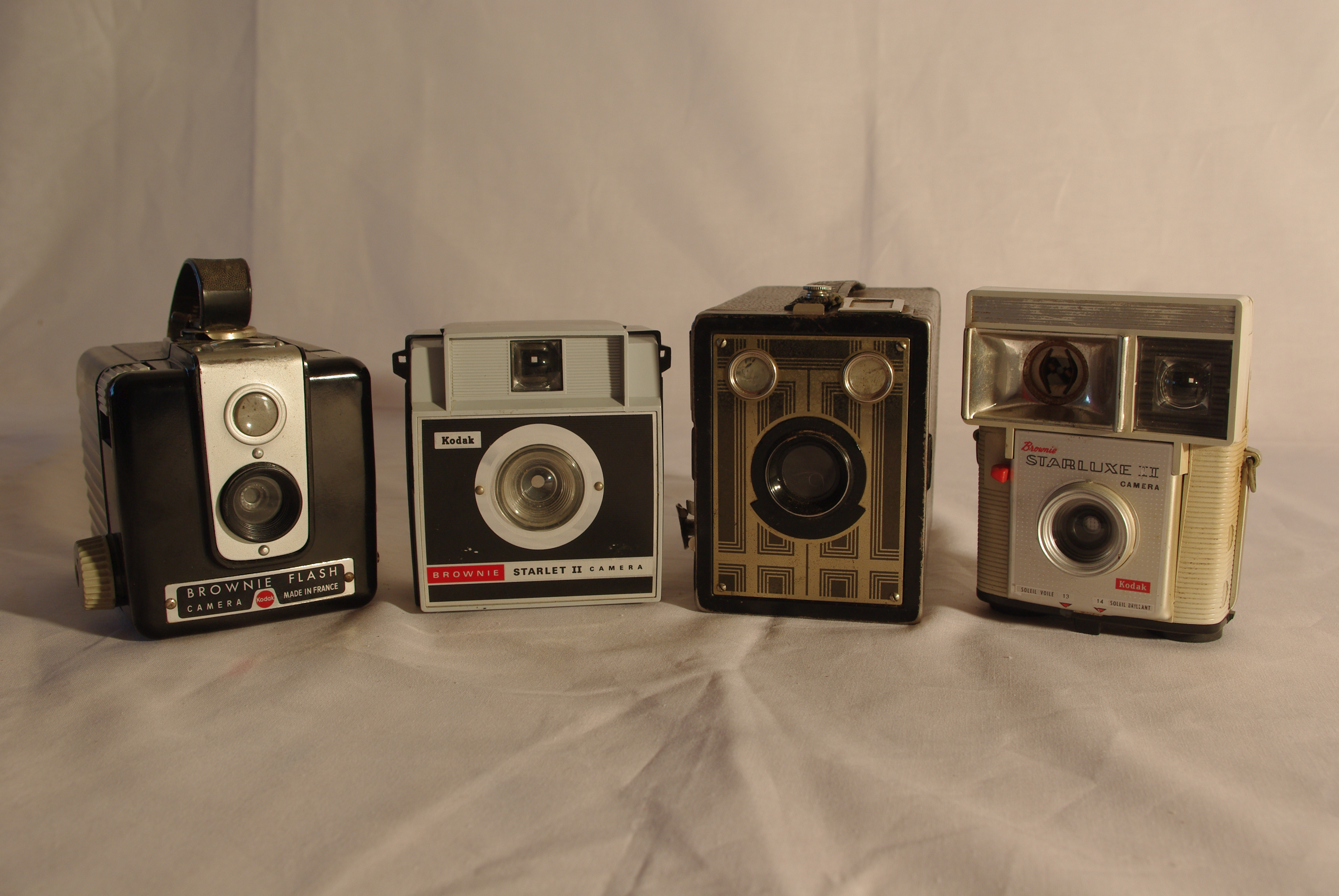
Different Kodak Brownies, the camera used to make Doug Chinnery's earliest images

He was originally known for his landscape photography, much of which made use of long exposures and intentional camera movement.

== Career ==
His landscape images began to appear in the photography press in the UK starting in 2008 with Photography Monthly. Further articles and features appeared in Practical Photography and cover images for Digital SLR and Outdoor Photography.

He started writing regularly for Amateur Photographer and Outdoor Photography magazine during 2011. This included articles on pinhole photography and seaside photography. He is occasional guest writer for the Great British Landscapes website where he has appeared as 'Featured Photographer'.

He won a Judges Choice award for his image "Cloud at Roker" in the 2010 Landscape Photographer of the Year Competition. His images selected as the overall favourite of judge John Langley. His image was published in the book of the competition by AA Publishing. Other judges of the competition included Charlie Waite.

He has exhibited at the National Theatre, London twice and his image was projected across the London skyline at night on the walls of the London Sinfonietta on both occasions.

His first solo exhibition was staged in June 2011 at the Patchings Art Centre, Nottinghamshire, England alongside separate exhibitions by English landscape and travel photographers Pete Bridgwood and Chris Upton. Titled 'Time Passing', it included 30 of his images all using exposures of one second or longer.

In October 2011 he was commended for his image, 'Scintilla IV', in the Sunday Times 'Take-a-View' Landscape Photographer of the Year competition. It was exhibited in London at the National Theatre during the winter of 2011/12 and was published in the book Landscape Photographer of the Year 2011.

He has since gone on to exhibit on London’s South Bank at the OXO Gallery and at The Mall Galleries with Charlie Waite et al

In 2015 he wrote the foreword for fellow photographer Chris Friel in his book, Framed published by Kozu Books.

In recent years he has become known for his work in abstract photography, making multiple exposure and intentional camera movement photographs.

His first book, ‘Abstract Mindedness’, was published by Kozu Books and contains images and poetry made during twelve months of mental illness following a breakdown. He donated his profits to the Young Minds UK mental health charity.
