= The Swan Road =

The Swan Road Лебединий шлях

Studio album by Drudkh
- Released: March 14, 2005
- Recorded: Summer/Fall 2004
- Genre: Black metal
- Length: 43:33
- Label: Supernal Music

Drudkh chronology
Autumn Aurora (2004)	The Swan Road; Лебединий шлях (2005)	Blood in Our Wells (2006)

The Swan Road (Ukrainian: Лебединий шлях, romanized: Lebedýnyi šljax) is the third album by the Ukrainian black metal band Drudkh, released in 2005. It is characterized by shorter songs and more prominent lyrics than are found on previous Drudkh releases. The lyrics are all taken from the epic poem Haydamaky, by Ukrainian national poet Taras Shevchenko, about the Ukrainian anti-Polish peasant rebellion of 1768. The name of the introductory track refers to the year of the greatest Cossack anti-Polish uprising set in Ukraine. The final track is an epic song on the destruction of Zaporizhian Sich by the Russian army in 1775. This album contains an increased use of distortion in the mix and more frequent usage of blast beats, but the last three tracks are considerably more low-key for Drudkh, with the final track ("Song of Sich Destruction") being a folk ballad, presaging the direction they would pursue further on the following year's Songs of Grief and Solitude.

Additionally, "Song of Sich Destruction" is not performed by Drudkh, but is a recording of a traditional Ukrainian Duma (folk song) performed by the bandura-player Igor Rachok.

== Track listing ==
No.	Title	Length
1.	"1648"	1:40
2.	"Вічне сонце (Eternal Sun)"	7:42
3.	"Кров (Blood)"	9:02
4.	"Заграва 1768-го (Glare of 1768)"	5:58
5.	"Ціна волі (The Price of Freedom)"	8:12
6.	"Доля (Fate)"	6:42
7.	"Дума про руйнування січі (Song of Sich Destruction)"	4:17
Total length:		43:33

== Critical reception ==
Professional ratings
Review scores
Source	Rating
Chronicles of Chaos (webzine)	9.5/10
Sputnikmusic	4/5
Metal Storm	7.9/10

The album received critical acclaim.
