= Ruines Humaines =

EP by Amesoeurs
- Released: October 06, 2006
- Recorded: April / June 2005
- Genre: Shoegaze, post-punk, black metal
- Length: 15:59
- Label: Northern Silence

Amesoeurs chronology
Ruines Humaines (2006)	Valfunde / Amesoeurs (2007)

Ruines Humaines is an EP by the French band Amesoeurs. It was released in 2006. The EP is dedicated to Ian Curtis and Joy Division.

The album was illustrated by former member Fursy Teyssier, who would later re-join the band. Northern Silence Productions released a special digipak edition and also a rerelease on 10" vinyl on March 23, 2007.

== Track listing ==
No.	Title	Lyrics	Music	Length
1.	"Bonheur Amputé" (Amputated Happiness)	Neige	Neige	4:32
2.	"Ruines Humaines" (Human Ruins)	Neige, Audrey Sylvain	Neige	6:25
3.	"Faiblesse des Sens" (Weakness of the Senses)	Sylvain	Neige, Sylvain	5:02

== Personnel ==
=== Musicians ===
- Neige - lead vocals, guitar, bass, synths, drums
- Audrey Sylvain - clean vocals

=== Technique ===
- Neige - recording
- Isabelle Hanssen - Photography (front cover)
- Stephane Pousse - Photography (back sleeve)
- Fursy Teyssier - Illustration
