= Hate Forest =

Ukrainian black metal band

- Origin: Kharkiv, Ukraine
- Genres: Black metal, dark ambient
- Years active: 1995–2004, 2019–present
- Labels: Osmose; Supernal Music
- Members: Roman Saenko
- Website: https://osmoseproductions-label.com/bands/hate-forest/

Hate Forest is a Ukrainian black metal band formed by Roman Saenko, the leading member of Drudkh, Dark Ages, and Blood of Kingu. Thurios joined the band in 1998 after recording Scythia. The music is fast with low, distorted vocals, low fidelity quality production, sometimes with programmed drums (a live player during concerts), and dark ambient elements. Some releases have consisted of dark ambient tracks. Influences are mostly from Scandinavian black metal to traditional death metal, especially Bolt Thrower, whose song "Cenotaph" they covered. According to the band, its lyrics are about mythology, mainly Slavic, and inspired by H. P. Lovecraft and Friedrich Nietzsche. The band does not give interviews or releases photos, and stands outside the black metal scene. After Hate Forest disbanded, Saenko focused on Drudkh and other side projects such as Blood of Kingu, Windswept and Precambrian. After a 16-year hiatus, Saenko released the Hate Forest album Hour of the Centaur in 2020, followed by more albums and EPs.

== Members ==
=== Lineup ===
- Roman Saenko (also in Drudkh, Blood of Kingu and Dark Ages) – Lead vocals, guitar, bass, keyboards, and drum programming.

=== Previous members ===
- Khaoth – drums (for live performance, 2001)
- Alzeth – guitar (1998–1999, 2002; former Dark Ages)
- Roman Novik – bass (for live performance, 2000 and 2001)
- Thurios (also in Drudkh, Blood of Kingu and Astrofaes) – vocals and guitar (1995–2004, for live performance, 2002)

== Discography ==
=== Albums ===
- Scythia (1999, Beverina / Pussy God / Ancient Nation / Noble Wolves / Blutreinheit / Osmose / Back on Black / Dread)
- The Curse (2000, Nawia / Kolovrat / Hammer of Damnation / Galgenstrang / Funeral / Werewolf)
- The Most Ancient Ones (2001, Supernal / Northern Heritage / Osmose / Back on Black / The True Neverdead / Dread)
- Purity (2003, Supernal / Slavonic Metal / Blut & Eisen / Osmose / Back on Black / The True Neverdead / Dread)
- Battlefields (2003, Supernal / Slavonic Metal / Blut & Eisen / Osmose / Back on Black / Darker Than Black / Dread)
- Sorrow (2005, Supernal / Soldats Inconnus / Totenkopf Propaganda / Back on Black / Osmose / Darker Than Black / Dread)
- Those Once Mighty Fallen split with Ildjarn (2013, Osmose / Darker Than Black / War Arts) (Note: Ildjarn part of the split doesn't belong to Ildjarn. The songs were composed by Ildjarn's friend Nidhogg in 1994 and later re-recorded for this split by unknown people.)
- Hour of the Centaur (2020, Osmose / Black Metal Store)
- Innermost (2022, Osmose / Black Metal Store)

=== Compilation albums ===
- Blood & Fire / Ritual (2001, Red Stream)
- To Those Who Came Before Us (2002, Night Birds)
- To Twilight Thickets (2003, Blutreinheit / Soldats Inconnus / Elegy)
- Nietzscheism (2005, Supernal / Primitive Reaction / Osmose / Darker Than Black)
- Dead But Dreaming (2009, Primitive Reaction / Werewolf / Darker Than Black)
- Celestial Wanderer / Sowing with Salt (2023, Osmose)

=== EPs ===
- Darkness (2000, Miriquidi / City of the Dead)
- Blood & Fire (2001, Sombre)
- Ritual (2001, Miriquidi / City of the Dead)
- The Gates (2001, Miriquidi / City of the Dead / Elegy / Soldats Inconnus / Funeral / Galgenstrang / Hammer of Damnation / Those Opposed)
- Resistance (2004, Ledo Takas / Werewolf)
- Temple Forest (2007, Hammer of Damnation / Galgenstrang / Funeral)
- Grief of the Universe/Spinning Galaxies split with Legion of Doom (2008, Zyklon-B)
- Celestial Wanderer (2020, Osmose)
- Sowing with Salt (2023, Osmose)
- Justice (2024, Osmose)
