= Microcosmos (Drudkh album) =

Studio album by Drudkh
- Released: June 22, 2009
- Recorded: Summer 2007 at ViTeR Music in Kharkiv, Ukraine
- Genre: Black metal
- Length: 41:43
- Label: Season of Mist

Drudkh chronology
Estrangement (2007)	Microcosmos (2009)	Slavonic Chronicles (2010)

Microcosmos is the seventh album by Ukrainian black metal band Drudkh, released on June 22 (July 14 in US), 2009. It was released as CD digipak (unlimited) and as box set (limited to 500 copies) by Season of Mist under the Underground Activists imprint.

The band continues using lyrics from Ukrainian poets, for example material by Ivan Franko on "Distant Cries of Cranes", Oleh Olzhych on "Decadence", or Bohdan Rubchak on "Ars Poetica".

The last track ("Widow's Grief") is taken from the soundtrack of the Ukrainian movie Atentat (1995), like the intro on the previous album Estrangement ("Solitary Endless Path"). The film is about the life and assassination of Stepan Bandera, leader of Ukrainian Insurgent Army, a Ukrainian partisan nationalist group during and after World War II.

The album was praised by critics: it was ranked 11 in Terrorizer Top 40 Albums of 2009 and 3 in Top 30 Metal Albums of 2009 by Haunting the Chapel, the Stereogum heavy music section.

== Track listing ==
No.	Title	Length
1.	"Минулі дні (Days that Passed)"	1:06
2.	"Далекий крик журавлів (Distant Cries of Cranes)"	9:37
3.	"Декаданс (Decadence)"	10:32
4.	"Ars Poetica"	9:47
5.	"Все, що не сказано раніше (Everything Unsaid Before)"	9:34
6.	"Вдовина скорбота (Widow's Grief)"	1:07
Total length:		41:43

== Personnel ==
- Thurios – vocals, guitars, keyboards
- Roman (Roman Saenko) – guitars
- Krechet – bass
- Vlad – drums, keyboards
