= Amesoeurs =

French metal band

- Amesoeurs logo

Background information
- Origin: Bagnols-sur-Cèze, France
- Genres: Post-black metal Post-punk
- Years active: 2004–2009
- Label: Code 666, Profound Lore
- Spinoff of: Alcest
- Past members: Neige; Audrey Sylvain; Fursy Teyssier; Winterhalter

Amesoeurs was a French post-black metal band. A side project of Neige of Alcest, the group was formed with musicians Audrey Sylvain and Fursy Teyssier in the summer of 2004 to create music that "reflects the dark side of the industrial era and modern civilization".

Teyssier left the band shortly after its creation, but returned in 2008. Winterhalter, who would go on to join Alcest and Les Discrets, joined in 2007. The band disbanded in 2009.

== History ==
Shortly after Amesoeurs's formation, a few songs were written and the band performed a show. Fursy left the band to return to his studies. In April 2005, they self-recorded the three-track EP Ruines Humaines. Neige had left black metal band Mortifera at the time, and he used two tracks ("Bonheur Amputé" and "Ruines Humaines") he had composed for Mortifera for Amesoeurs's EP. Northern Silence Productions released the EP in 2006.

In 2007, Fursy rejoined the band and Winterhalter, former drummer of Peste Noire between 2006 and 2008, was enlisted for the band's debut album, Amesoeurs. It was recorded during the winter of 2008 in the Klangschmiede Studio E with Markus Stock from Empyrium, and the band described it as "a kaleidoscopic soundtrack for the modern era".

The album was released in March 2009 through Italian label Code 666 records. Pitchfork gave the album a 7, calling it a "journal of triumph and heartbreak" and "a fervid last gasp of genre-melding creativity". Allmusic writer Ned Raggett gave it a three-star rating, stating "the most notable thing about Amesoeurs is how little of a unique identity it has in the end. Nearly every notable trend in recent French metal seems to crop up throughout, not to mention other sounds from elsewhere in Europe". Cam Lindsay of Exclaim! stated that the album "furthers black metal's scope while ruffling a few feathers along the way".

After the album release, Amesoeurs split up due to "internal conflicts and different points of view regarding the band's future". Teyssier and Winterhalter formed Les Discrets, while Neige focused back on Alcest. Winterhalter became Alcest's drummer in 2009.

== Line-up history ==
- Neige – screamed vocals, guitars, bass, synthesizer (2004–2009), drums (2004–2007)
- Audrey Sylvain – lead vocals, bass, piano (2004–2009)
- Fursy Teyssier – guitars, bass (2004, 2008–2009)
- Winterhalter – drums (2007–2009)

== Discography ==
- Ruines Humaines – EP, 2006
- Valfunde/Amesoeurs – Split album, 2007
- Amesoeurs – Full-length, 2009
