= Forgotten Legends =

Studio album by Drudkh
- Released: August 18, 2003
- Recorded: Summer 2002
- Genre: Black metal, pagan metal
- Length: 39:22
- Label: Supernal Music

Drudkh chronology
Forgotten Legends (2003)	Autumn Aurora (2004)

Professional ratings
Review scores
Source	Rating
MadeLoud	5/5 stars

Forgotten Legends is the first full-length album by Ukrainian black metal band Drudkh. The album's sound and atmosphere have often been compared favourably to those of Burzum. The lyrics to the album are not publicly known and have never been released.

The album was remastered and reissued on Season of Mist's Underground Activists label in 2009 as a digipak with new artwork.

Forgotten Legends was included in an all-time Top 40 Black Metal Albums list by Terrorizer magazine.

Most releases of the album list the song titles only in English, but the iTunes release and multiple streaming services list both English and Ukrainian language titles.

== Track listing ==
No.	Title	Length
1.	"Досвітні сутінки (False Dawn)"	15:57
2.	"Ліси у вогні і золоті (Forests in Fire and Gold)"	8:55
3.	"Вічний оберт колеса (Eternal Turn of the Wheel)"	11:44
4.	"Запах дощу (Smell of Rain)"	2:46
Total length:		39:22

== Personnel ==
- Roman Saenko – guitars, bass
- Thurios – vocals, keyboards

=== Guest musicians ===
- Yuriy Sinitsky – drums
