= Handful of Stars =

Handful of Stars Пригорща зірок

Studio album by Drudkh
- Released: September 20, 2010
- Recorded: 2010
- Genre: Post-black metal, post-rock
- Length: 41:40
- Label: Season of Mist

Drudkh chronology
| Slavonic Chronicles (2010) | Handful of Stars; Пригорща зірок (2010) | Eternal Turn of the Wheel (2012) |

Professional ratings
Review scores
| Source | Rating |
|---|---|
| About.com | 3.5/5 stars |
| AllMusic | 2.5/5 stars |
| Chronicles of Chaos | 8/10 |

Handful of Stars (Ukrainian: Пригорща Зірок, Pryhorshcha Zirok) is the eighth full-length album by Ukrainian black metal band Drudkh, released in 2010 on Season of Mist's Underground Activists label.

The guitar sound on this album is significantly cleaner than that on any previous album the band had released, with the exception of the band's folk album Songs of Grief and Solitude. Critics and fans noticed a strong influence from post-rock and such bands as Alcest. Due to these features the record received mixed reviews, though it appeared in Haunting the Chapel's Top 50 Albums of 2010 at the number 8 position. Again, for lyrics was used the poetry of Ukrainian authors, such as Oleksa Stefanovych and Svyatoslav Gordynskyj.

The limited edition box set of the album came with an EP entitled Slavonic Chronicles which featured covers of songs by Czech Republic's Master's Hammer and Poland's Sacrilegium. The EP was also issued separately as a 10" vinyl record.

== Track listing ==
| No. | Title | Length |
|---|---|---|
| 1. | "Холодні краєвиди (Cold Landscapes)" | 1:13 |
| 2. | "Загибель епохи (Downfall of the Epoch)" | 12:07 |
| 3. | "До світла (Towards the Light)" | 9:15 |
| 4. | "Ореол з сутінок (Twilight Aureole)" | 8:57 |
| 5. | "Прийде день (The Day Will Come)" | 9:04 |
| 6. | "Слухаючи тишу (Listening to the Silence)" | 1:04 |
| Total length: | | 41:40 |

== Personnel ==
- Thurios – vocals, guitars, keyboards
- Roman (Roman Saenko) – guitars
- Krechet – bass
- Vlad – drums, keyboards
- Fursy Teyssier – artwork
