= Drudkh =

Ukrainian black metal band

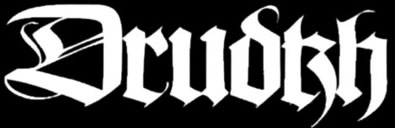
- Band logo

Background information
- Origin: Kharkiv, Ukraine
- Genre: Black metal
- Years active: 2002–present
- Label: Season of Mist
- Spinoffs: Blood of Kingu
- Members: Roman Saenko; Thurios; Krechet; Vlad
- Website: https://www.season-of-mist.com/bands/drudkh/

Drudkh is a Ukrainian black metal band. It consists of Roman Saenko (of Hate Forest and formerly of Dark Ages), Thurios (former member of Astrofaes and Hate Forest), Krechet, and Vlad. All four were members of Blood of Kingu until it was disbanded. Their lyrics and themes embrace Slavic mythology and Ukrainian nationalism. Many of the lyrics derive from the works of nineteenth and twentieth-century Ukrainian poets (Oleksandr Oles, Oleh Olzhych, Maik Yohansen, etc.), especially Taras Shevchenko.

Drudkh are secretive, more so than the average black metal band. They do not give interviews nor release the lyrics to several of their albums. From their inception until 2009, Drudkh did not have an official website, but in May 2009, Season of Mist launched an official Myspace, operated by the label rather than the band.

The word "drudkh" is Sanskrit for "forest" or "tree".

== History ==
Drudkh has released eleven albums, two EPs, four splits, one single, and two compilations of early material. Except an EP, their early recordings were released on CD through English extreme metal record label Supernal Music, and on vinyl through Finnish black metal labels Northern Heritage and Faustian Distribution. Recent releases have been through Season of Mist, which also issued remastered versions of the band's earlier albums as digipaks.

The band's first album, Forgotten Legends, was released on 18 August 2003. The album established the band's sound. The album's three tracks and outro span nearly forty minutes. The longest track, "False Dawn", nears sixteen minutes. Terrorizer included Forgotten Legends in its Top 40 Black Metal albums list.

Autumn Aurora followed on 28 November 2004. While continuing its predecessor's mood and atmosphere, it incorporated synthesizers and other keyboard instruments. This record was chosen as the best album of the year by Chronicles of Chaos webzine.

After Autumn Aurora, Amorth (drums, keyboards) joined the band and replaced Yuriy.

The Swan Road (Лебединий шлях) was released on 14 March 2005. It was well-reviewed, and is the first Drudkh album to have Ukrainian lyrics, adapted or taken from The Haidamakas (1841) by Taras Shevchenko, narrating the Ukrainian anti-Polish uprising of 1768. Its CD booklet included prints of Shevchenko's notebooks, which many non-Ukrainian-speaking fans mistook for lyrics. The addition of Shevchenko's poetry gave Drudkh a pronounced nationalistic leaning that continued on the next album.

On 23 March 2006, Drudkh released Blood in Our Wells (Кров у наших криницях), once again through Supernal Music, in a deluxe edition (limited to 1000 hand-numbered copies) and a normal CD edition. On this album, poetry from four nineteenth- and twentieth-century Ukrainian poets (including Oleksandr Oles and Lina Kostenko) serves as lyrical material, and the album itself was dedicated to Stepan Bandera, leader of the Organization of Ukrainian Nationalists. Musically, the album adds progressive rock influences and increased use of traditional heavy metal soloing into the mix, while retaining the band's tradition of blending black metal and Ukrainian folk music. Because several tracks sample the Ukrainian poetic film Mamay (2003), the album has greater use of cinematic elements than its predecessors. It was Drudkh's first record to appear in the Terrorizer Top 40 year list, placing at number 35.

After the release of Blood in Our Wells, Amorth left the band, and new members Krechet (bass) and Vlad (drums) joined.

On 19 October 2006, Drudkh released Songs of Grief and Solitude (Пісні скорботи і самітності). This release is composed of folk music, with much of the music containing melodic elements from previous Drudkh compositions (for example, "The Cranes Will Never Return Here" is based on a riff from "Solitude" on Blood in Our Wells, and "Archaic Dance" is based on a riff from "Glare of 1768" on The Swan Road). It is entirely instrumental, with barely any drumming, and prominently features wind instruments. The album received mixed reviews, with some fans criticizing the band for reusing old material, and others praising the band's radical reconstruction of its own sound.

On 16 April 2007, Supernal Music released Drudkh's Anti-Urban, a 45-RPM 10 inch coloured vinyl limited to 999 hand-numbered copies containing exclusive tracks available only to Supernal Music customers. Season of Mist later re-released it as a mini CD in 2009 as part of the deluxe box-set edition of Microcosmos, and it was also included on the band's collection Eastern Frontier in Flames.

The band's next release, a full-length black metal album titled Estrangement (Вiдчуженiсть), was released on 25 August 2007, again as a limited deluxe edition (1000 hand-numbered copies) and as a normal CD. The album, which had the working title River of Tears, had been rumored to have a "Burzumic" feel before its release, and in some ways, this was borne out by the album's release; its songs were in many ways significantly more minimalistic than those on Blood in Our Wells. Its lyrics were based completely on the 1931-1932 works of Ukrainian poet Oleh Olzhych. Reception to the album has been largely positive, with many fans hailing it as a return to the band's roots or praising the band's musicianship demonstrated in the album's many solos. Notably, the album also featured the band's first prominent use of blast beats since The Swan Road. A spoken introduction in the first track is taken from the 1995 Ukrainian feature film Assassination. An Autumn Murder in Munich about Bandera's life and assassination.

In 2008, the band signed with the French label Season of Mist. On 22 June (14 July in the United States), 2009, the seventh Drudkh album Microcosmos was released through the label Underground Activists, published by Season of Mist. The standard CD version is a digipak; a limited edition box set also contained an MCD re-release of Anti-Urban. The lyrics are once again taken from Ukrainian poets, like Ivan Franko, Oleh Olzhych, or Bohdan Rubchak. The outro is sampled from Assassination. The album was praised by critics, ranking eleventh in Terrorizer's Top 40 Albums of 2009 and third in Haunting the Chapel's (Stereogum's metal section) Top 30 Metal Albums of 2009.

In November 2009, Season of Mist began re-releasing Drudkh's whole catalogue, starting with remastered reissues of Forgotten Legends and Autumn Aurora, and finishing with new editions of Songs of Grief and Solitude and Estrangement in June 2010.

Drudkh's eighth full-length album, Handful of Stars (Пригорща зірок), was released on 21 September 2010, via Season of Mist. Critics and fans noticed the changes in style and sound: it was much clearer than previous efforts and bore influence from post-rock. The record received mixed reviews as a result, though it appeared in Haunting the Chapel's Top 50 Albums of 2010 at 8 position. Again, for lyrics was used the poetry of Ukrainian authors, such as Oleksa Stefanovych and Svyatoslav Gordynskyj. The release of the new Drudkh full-length was supported with Slavonic Chronicles mini album, which consisted of two covers of Master's Hammer and Sacrilegium. It was released as a CD only with a deluxe edition of Handful of Stars and also as 10" LP including a download card to get the digital version of the record. As opposed to Handful of Stars, Slavonic Chronicles was much more stylistically similar to their older works like Blood in Our Wells.

The post-rock direction, that was present at Handful of Stars, has been developed in a new project titled Old Silver Key by Drudkh members with French musician Neige of Alcest on vocals. This supergroup signed to Season of Mist and released debut record titled Tales of Wanderings on 16 September (27 September in North America), 2011.

Drudkh's album Eternal Turn of the Wheel, recorded in summer 2011, was released on 24 February (13 March in North America), 2012, through Season of Mist.

Drudkh's tenth album, A Furrow Cut Short, was released on 20 April 2015.

In 2024, former drummer Mykola Sostin, who performed as "Amorth" and was in Drudkh from 2004 to 2006, was killed in battle while fighting for Ukraine during the Russo-Ukrainian War.

== Band members ==
Current

- Roman Saenko (Роман Саєнко) – guitars (2003–present)
- Thurios (Roman Blahykh, Роман Благих) – vocals, guitars (2003–present)
- Krechet – bass (2006–present)
- Vlad (Vladyslav Petrov, Владислав Петров) – drums, keyboards (2006–present)

=== Former ===
- Amorth – drums, keyboards (2004–2006; died 2024)

== Discography ==
Studio albums

- Forgotten Legends (2003)
- Autumn Aurora (2004)
- The Swan Road (2005)
- Blood in Our Wells (2006)
- Songs of Grief and Solitude (2006)
- Estrangement (2007)
- Microcosmos (2009)
- Handful of Stars (2010)
- Eternal Turn of the Wheel (2012)
- A Furrow Cut Short (2015)
- They Often See Dreams About the Spring (2018)
- All Belong to the Night (2022)
- Shadow Play (2025)

EPs

- Anti-Urban (2007)
- Slavonic Chronicles (2010)
- Thaw (2026)

Splits

- Thousands of Moons Ago / The Gates (2014; split with Winterfylleth)
- One Who Talks With The Fog / Pyre Era, Black! (2016; split with Hades Almighty)
- Betrayed By The Sun / Hgringar (Mirages) (2016; split with Grift)
- Somewhere Sadness Wanders / Schnee (IV) (2017; split with Paysage d'Hiver)

Compilations

- Eastern Frontier in Flames (2014; compiles 3 non-LP releases from 2007-2014)
- A Few Lines in Archaic Ukrainian (2019; compiles 3 non-LP releases from 2016-2017)
