= Septembre et ses dernières pensées =

Studio album by Les Discrets
- Released: 26 March 2010
- Recorded: May–July 2009
- Studio: Drudenhaus Studio, Issé, France
- Genre: Post-metal, post-rock, shoegaze, blackgaze
- Length: 43:15
- Language: French
- Label: Prophecy Productions
- Producer: Martin Koller for Prophecy Productions

Les Discrets chronology
Alcest / Les Discrets (2009)	Septembre et ses dernières pensées (2010)	Les Discrets / Arctic Plateau (2011)

Professional ratings
Review scores
Source	Rating
Blistering	(9/10)
Chronicles of Chaos	(8.5/10)
Metal Storm	(9/10)
MetalReview	(9.2/10)
PopMatters	(8/10)

Septembre et ses dernières pensées (English: September and Its Last Thoughts) is the debut album from French band Les Discrets. It was released on 26 March 2010 through Prophecy Productions.

== Track listing ==
All lyrics are written by Audrey Hadorn (except "Chanson d'automne" by Paul Verlaine); all music is composed by Fursy Teyssier.

No.	Title	Length
1.	"L'Envol des corbeaux" (The Flight of the Ravens)	1:26
2.	"L'Échappée" (The Breakaway)	4:03
3.	"Les Feuilles de l'olivier" (The Leaves of the Olive Tree)	4:36
4.	"Song for Mountains"	5:59
5.	"Sur les quais" (On the Docks)	3:03
6.	"Effet de nuit" (Night Effect)	5:54
7.	"Septembre et ses dernières pensées" (September and Its Last Thoughts)	2:29
8.	"Chanson d'automne" (Autumn Song)	7:40
9.	"Svipdagr & Freyja"	3:58
10.	"Une matinée d'hiver" (A Winter Forenoon)	4:07
Total length:		43:15

== Personnel ==
=== Les Discrets ===
- Fursy Teyssier - lead vocals, guitars, bass
- Audrey Hadorn - vocals
- Winterhalter - drums

=== Production ===
- Neb Xort - recording and mixing
- Fursy Teyssier - artwork and design
- Andy Julia - band pictures
