= Oleksandr Oles =

Ukrainian writer and poet

Oleksandr Kandyba
- Олександр Іванович Кандиба
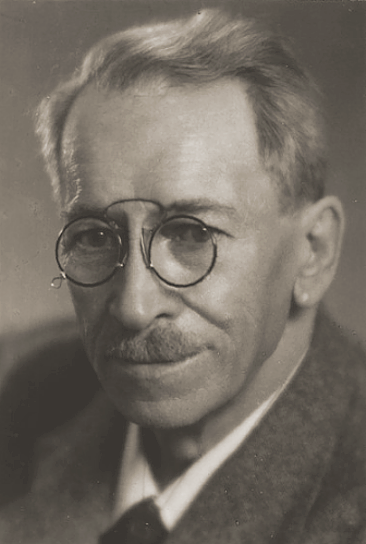
- Born: 23 November 1878; Bilopillia, Kharkov Governorate, Russian Empire
- Died: 22 July 1944 (aged 65); Prague, Protectorate of Bohemia and Moravia
- Education: Kharkiv veterinary institute
- Occupations: writer and poet
- Children: Oleh Olzhych
- Writing career
- Pen name: Oleksandr Oles
- Period: 1906-1944

Oleksandr Oles (born Oleksandr Ivanovych Kandyba, Ukrainian: Олександр Іванович Кандиба; 1878–1944) was a prominent Ukrainian writer and poet. He was the father of another Ukrainian poet and political activist, Oleh Olzhych, who perished in the Nazi labor camps in 1944. (Note: Accounts vary on whether he succumbed to his injuries or took his own life.)

== Biography ==
=== Early years and emigration ===
He was born on 23 November 1878 in the khutir (small village) of Kandyba (now the village of Kandybyne, Bilopillia raion, Sumy Oblast) in Kharkiv province. He studied at the Kharkiv agriculture school, later at the Kharkiv veterinary institute.

He is one of the representatives of the Ukrainian Cossack family of Kandyba.

Since 1920 he lived in Vienna, where he headed the Union of Ukrainian Journalists and edited the magazine Na Perelomu. Since 1924 he lived in Prague, Czechoslovakia. Oleksandr Oles was one of the founders of the Ukrainian Free University, which moved to Prague from Vienna in 1921.

=== Family ===
In 1907 Oles married Vira Svadkovska. They had a son - Oleh Olzhych, who also became a famous Ukrainian poet. Oleh was active in the Ukrainian nationalistic resistance in Ukraine during World War II. His ties with OUN-M led to his arrest by the Gestapo. He was tortured and later found dead in his cell at Sachsenhausen concentration camp on 10 June 1944. (Note: Accounts vary on whether he succumbed to his injuries or took his own life.)

=== Death and burial ===
Oles died in emigration in Prague on 22 July 1944. He was buried there until early January 2016, when his and his wife's remains were exhumed and replaced by the body of Volodymyr Mykhailyshyn, who was the man that had been paying for the family grave. On 29 January 2017 Oles and his wife Vira were reburied at Lukyanivske cemetery in Ukraine's capital Kyiv. The ceremony was paid for by the Ukrainian government and attended by President of Ukraine Petro Poroshenko and his wife Maryna Poroshenko.

== Works ==
Among his poetic collections are "Z zhurboyu radist obnymalas" — With Sadness a Joy was Embracing, "Komu povim pechal moyu" — To Whom I'll Tell About My Woes, and others (nine poetry books altogether). Oleksandr Oles also created several dramatic works.
