= Folkfuck Folie =

Folkfuck folie

Studio album by Peste Noire
- Released: June 18, 2007
- Genre: Black metal
- Length: 48:22
- Label: De Profundis, Transcendental, Night Birds

Peste Noire chronology
Lorraine rehearsal (2007)	Folkfuck folie (2007)	Ballade cuntre lo Anemi Francor (2009)

Professional ratings
Review scores
Source	Rating
Sputnikmusic	4/5 stars

Folkfuck folie ("Folkfuck Folly") is the second album by French black metal band Peste Noire. A limited vinyl version co-produced by Northern Heritage and De profundis éditions was released in April 2010. It includes a long 2007 interview answered by Famine.

== Track listing ==
No.	Title	Length
1.	"L'envol du grabataire (Ode à famine)" (The Flight of the Bedridden (Ode to Famine))	3:42
2.	"Chute pour une culbute" (Taking a Tumble)	3:36
3.	"La fin del secle" (The End of the World)	4:51
4.	"D'un vilain" (From a Villain)	2:46
5.	"Condamné à la pondaison (Légende funèbre)" (Sentenced to Siring (A Mournful Legend))	7:18
6.	"La césarienne" (The Caesarian)	3:22
7.	"Maleiçon" (Malediction)	6:10
8.	"Amour ne m'amoit ne je li" (Love Didn't Love Me Nor Did I Love It)	3:04
9.	"Psaume IV" (Psalm IV)	2:57
10.	"Extrait radiophonique d'Antonin Artaud" (Radio Extract of Antonin Artaud)	0:57
11.	"Folkfuck folie" (Folkfuck Folly)	4:38
12.	"Paysage mauvais" (Evil Landscape)	5:01

== Credits ==
- La Sale Famine de Valfunde – all guitars, vocals
- Indria – bass
- Winterhalter – drums
- Neige – guitar, vocals on "La Césarienne"
- La sale Famine de Valfunde – artwork and concept
