= Arctic Plateau =

- Origin: Italy
- Genres: Post-rock, shoegaze
- Years active: 2006–present
- Labels: Shunu Records, Prophecy Productions
- Members: Gianluca Divirgilio
- Website: www.arcticplateau.com

Arctic Plateau is an Italian post-rock and shoegaze one-man band formed by Gianluca Divirgilio in 2006. He released part of his early raw songs on Myspace and signed with Prophecy Productions in 2008. Divirgilio describes his music as "Music Explicitly Dreamed".

== Biography ==
The first song, "Eight Years Old", was composed in June 2006. In the same year, Gianluca composed other instrumental tracks, and recorded two songs called "Coldream" and "On a Sad Sunny Day"; he released part of these raw songs on Myspace. In March 2007, he decided to record a promo CD in Emerald Recordings Studio in Rome, with the help of Fabio Fraschini on bass (previous session man for Novembre), Cesare Petulicchio on drums (Bud Spencer Blues Explosion), and Luigi Colasanti Antonelli as a sound engineer. Gianluca sent the promo to the attention of European labels and on March 13, 2008, he signed a contract for five albums with Prophecy Productions.

The first studio album, On a Sad Sunny Day, was released on June 12, 2009. All songs for his first studio album were composed and written by Divirgilio himself.

== Discography ==
- On a Sad Sunny Day (full-length, 2009)
- Les Discrets / Arctic Plateau (split EP with Les Discrets, 2011)
- The Enemy Inside (full-length, 2012)
- Songs of Shame (full-length, 2022)
