= Chris Friel (photographer) =

Chris Friel (born 1959) is a British photographer noted for his abstract landscape images.

== Photography ==
Friel was a painter for many years before turning to photography in 2006, since when he has not painted. This change in medium coincided with his leaving London to live on a beach in Whitstable, Kent. He has talked about the importance of the Kent countryside and coast to his work.

His early photographic work was shot in black and white. The reason he has given for this is that he is partially colour blind and "did not feel confident enough to shoot landscapes with the correct colour balance". However, since 2009 most of his prolific output has been in colour. He is quoted as saying that he usually shoots 1000 images a day. He has cited his early influences as the Russian photographer Alexey Titarenko, the Canadian impressionist landscape photographer Frank Grisdale and the British painter Kurt Jackson; and other influences as James Wainwright, Peter Scammell, Toshihiro Oshima, and Luis Montemeyer; while Tim Parkin has noted the influence of Fay Godwin, Bill Brandt and Harry Callahan.

All of his photographs are produced using digital cameras and a combination of tilt-shift lenses, long exposure photography and intentional camera movement – the movement of the camera over the course of the exposure. He has said "My aversion to sitting in front of computers means that I do minimal post production on images".

His photographs have been exhibited widely including at the South Bank Centre London, on the Santiago subway in Chile, and projected behind the London Sinfonietta in the Royal Festival Hall, and Mikhail Palinchak has described him as "one of the finest contemporary landscape photographers in the uk today".

He was shortlisted for The Sunday Times' Landscape Photographer of the Year for the last four years, and won a judge's choice award in 2011.

In 2011 Friel published Moving Pictures, a collection of 80 of his abstract colour landscape photos with an essay by the Canadian art critic Ann Marie Simard.

2011 also saw Friel collaborating with Matthew Herbert on the artwork for his album one pig.

Beginning in 2009, Friel's work has been featured as album covers for musician/composer Kevin Kastning. As of 2025, Friel's work has been used on 10 of Kastning's albums.

In 2015 published a collection of his images in a book entitled 'Framed' published by Triplekite Books with a foreword by Doug Chinnery

== Publications ==
Photographs by Friel appear within:

- Various contributors. Landscape Photographer of the Year. Collection 2. AA Publishing 2008. ISBN 0-7495-5905-5.
- Various contributors. Street Portrait Classics. Editor Zac Jenkins 2008. Blurb.com.
- Various contributors. Citypulse Citizen Collection. Citypulse Publishing Santiago Chile 2009. Blurb.com.
- Various contributors. Landscape Photographer of the Year Collection 3. AA Publishing 2009. ISBN 0-7495-6334-6.
- Chris Friel. Postcards From Kent. 2009. Blurb.com.
- Various contributors. Citypulse Biosphere Collection. Citypulse Publishing, Santiago, Chile, 2010. Blurb.com.
- Various contributors. Por Chile. Citypulse Publishing Santiago, Chile, 2010. Lulu.com.
- Various contributors. Landscape Photographer of the Year. Collection 4. AA Publishing 2010. ISBN 0-7495-6736-8.
- Chris Friel. Long Exposure. Frontview Gallery Catalogue, 2010. Blurb.com.
- Chris Friel. Moving Pictures. Citypulse Inbook Publishers, 2011. Blurb.com.
- Various contributors. Landscape Photographer of the Year. Collection 5. AA Publishing 2011. ISBN 0-7495-7140-3.
- Chris Friel. "Framed." Triplekite Publishing, 2015. ISBN 978-0-9932589-0-9
- Laure Morali and Chris Friel. "Le Cercle du rivage". Editions publie, 2015. ISBN 9782371774360.
- Chris Friel. "Anecdotes". JW Editions 2021. ISBN 978-0-9930892-3-7.
- Chris Friel. "Hypergraphia". JW Editions 2022. ISBN 978-0-9930892-4-4.
