= Oleh Olzhych =

Ukrainian poet and activist

- Олег Ольжич
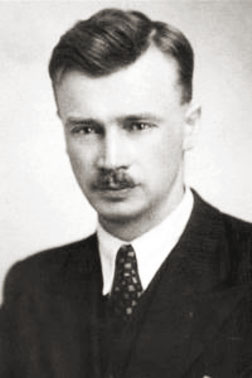
- Born: Oleh Oleksandrovych Kandyba; 8 July 1907; Zhytomyr, Russian Empire
- Died: 10 June 1944 (aged 36); Sachsenhausen concentration camp, Nazi Germany
- Occupations: Poet, archaeologist, activist

Oleh Oleksandrovych Kandyba (Ukrainian: Олег Олександрович Кандиба; 8 July 1907 – 10 June 1944), better known his pen name of Oleh Olzhych (Ukrainian: Олег Ольжич), was a Ukrainian poet and political activist. He was forced to emigrate from Ukraine in 1923 due to occupation by the Soviet Union and lived in Prague, Czechoslovakia. He graduated in 1929 from Charles University with a degree in archaeology. In 1929 he joined the Organization of Ukrainian Nationalists (OUN) and became head of their cultural and educational branch.

After the split in the OUN in 1938, Olzhych remained loyal to the Andriy Melnyk faction and represented the OUN-M in Carpatho-Ukraine as Melnyk's deputy. Olzhych's poetry focused on themes of the Ukrainian struggle for independence. He moved to Kyiv in 1941 and was instrumental in the formation of the Ukrainian National Council.

After Melnyk’s arrest in 1944, he briefly became head of the OUN-M. He was arrested by the Gestapo along with other political activists who were seeking of revival of Ukraine. He was severely beaten and died at Sachsenhausen concentration camp on 9 June 1944, with primary accounts split over whether he succumbed to his injuries or committed suicide by hanging.

The Ukrainian diaspora and OUN veterans in exile financed and erected in Lehighton, Pennsylvania in July 1977. Then head of the Organization of Ukrainian Nationalists in exile Oleh Zhdanovych flew from Europe to attend the opening ceremony.

A monument to Olzhych was unveiled in Zhytomyr in 2017.

Oleh Olzhych was the son of the famous Ukrainian writer Oleksandr Oles.
