= Alex Kurtagić =

British musician

- Born: 1970 (age 55–56)
- Citizenship: UK
- Occupations: author, editor, publisher, artist, musician
- Known for: Album cover illustration Supernal Music (record label); Mister (novel)
- Website: alexkurtagic.info

Alex Kurtagić (born 1970) is a British artist, musician, novelist, and publisher. He is the founder of Supernal Music, an independent metal label, and various publishing houses. Between 2009 and 2013 he was a far-right speaker and writer, but in 2019, he stated that he had disengaged from political extremism.

== Life ==
Kurtagić was born in 1970 to a family of Spanish and Slovenian ancestry. Due to his parents' jobs, he spent part of his youth in South America. In 1995, he founded the Black Metal music project Benighted Leams, which has since released four albums between 1996 and 2006. In 1996, he founded Supernal Music.

During the mid-to-late 1990s, his illustrations appeared on albums by black metal artists, such as Dimmu Borgir, Deinonychus, and Tormentor, among others. His cover of Dimmu Borgir's Stormblåst is featured in the book Heavy Metal Thunder: Album Covers That Rocked the World.

== Writer ==
Kurtagić's dystopian novel, Mister, was published in 2009. From then until 2013, he was active as a far-right intellectual figure. In 2011, a collection of articles and essays was published in book form by Unitall Verlag in German translation, with the title Ja, Afrika muss zur Hölle gehen. A second collection, also in German, was published by Antaios in 2013 as Warum Konservative immer verlieren.

In 2019, a book collecting his artwork was published, containing also anecdotal, fictional, semi-fictional, and satirical texts. In the preface, he distanced himself from political extremism. A reader's edition was published in 2026.

A second novel, Angel, was published in 2022.

== Supernal Music ==
Supernal Music offered a mail order catalogue of underground music throughout the late 1990s, particularly extreme metal and black metal. Its later roster included bands such as Astrofaes and Drudkh from Ukraine, Fleurety and Mayhem from Norway, and The Meads of Asphodel from the United Kingdom.

== Discography ==
=== Benighted Leams ===
- Caliginous Romantic Myth (1996)
- Astral Tenebrion (1998)
- Ferly Centesms (2004)
- Obombrid Welkins (2006)

== Bibliography ==
- Mister. Iron Sky Publishing, 2009. ISBN 978-0-9561835-0-7
- Ja, Afrika muss zur Hölle gehen. Unitall Verlag, 2011. ISBN 978-3-905937-43-5
- Warum Konservative immer verlieren. Antaios (2013); ISBN 978-3-944422-35-0
- The Art of Alex Kurtagic. Spradabach Publishing, 2019. ISBN 978-1-9993573-0-6
- Angel. Spradabach Publishing, 2022. ISBN 978-1-9993573-7-5
- A Gallery of Grotesqueries: A Visual-Literary Cabinet of Bad Manners, Black Metal, and Sundry Monstrosities. Spradabach Publishing, 2026. ISBN 978-1-909606-65-4

== Translations ==
- The Golden Tread by Miguel Serrano. The Palingenesis Project, 2017.
- The Veil Lifted for the Curious, or the Secrets of the French Revolution Revealed with the Aid of Freemasonry by Jacques-François Lefranc. Spradabach Publishing, 2022.
