= List of Cradle of Filth members =

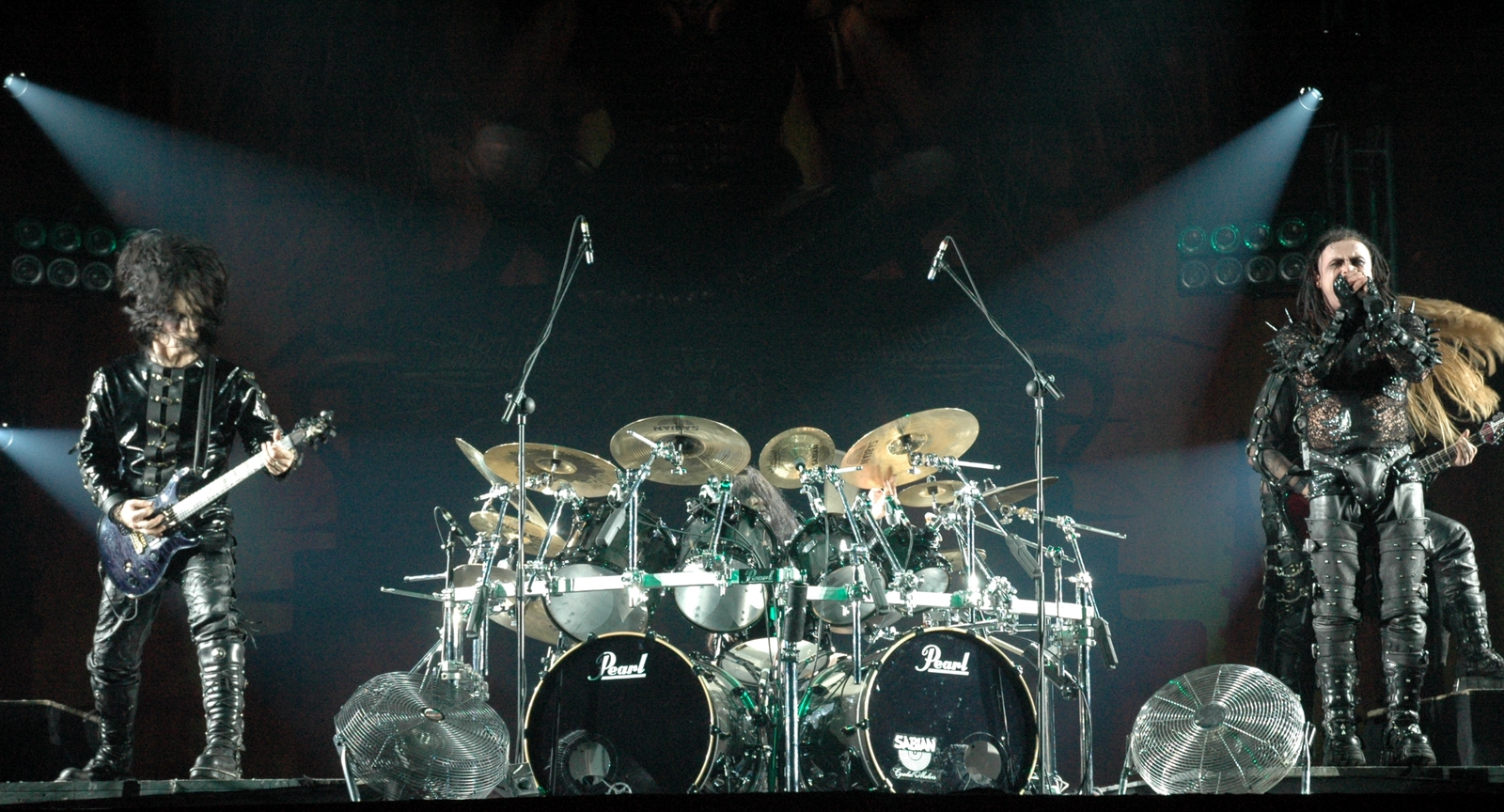
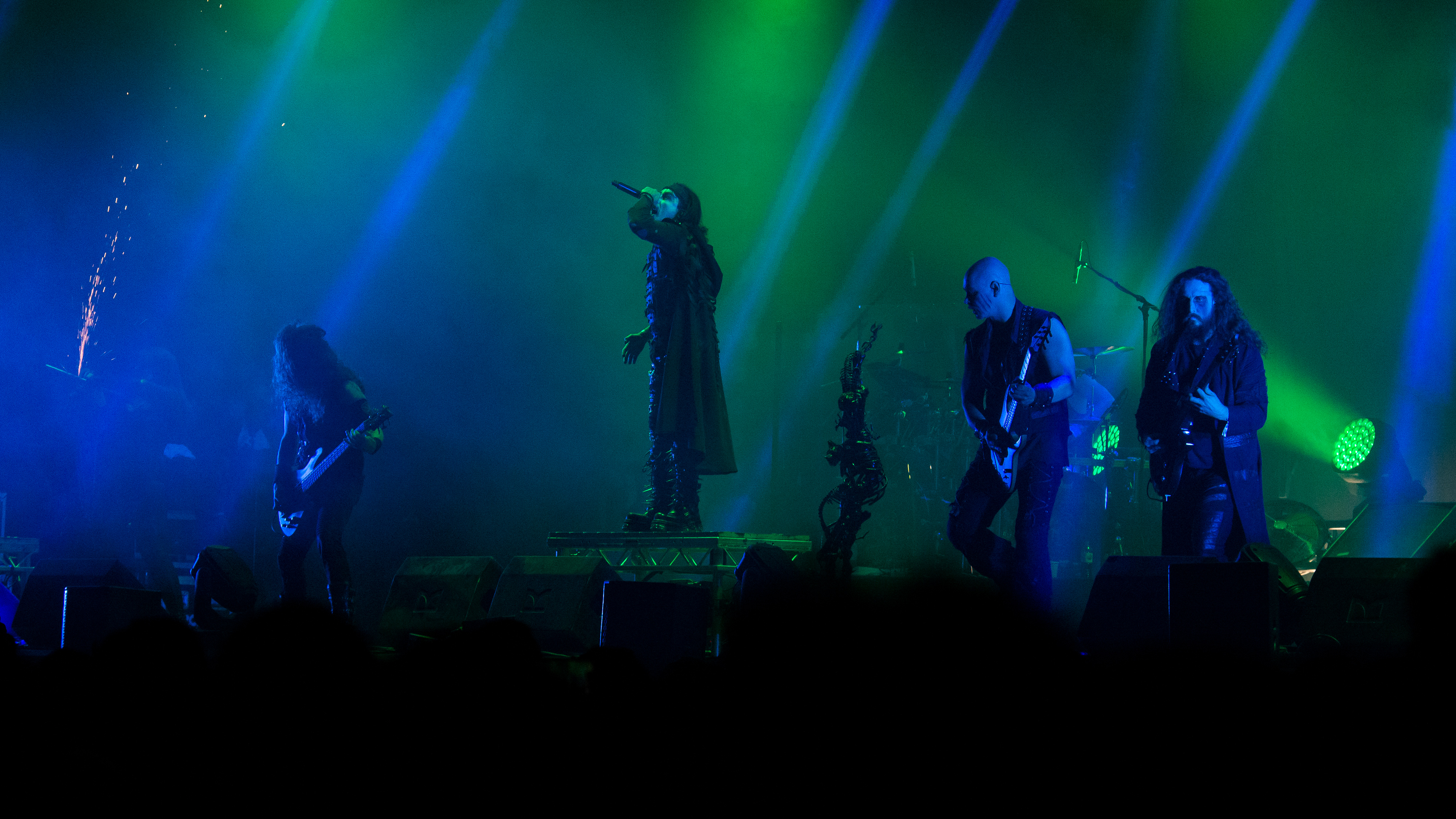
Two lineups of Cradle of Filth performing live in 2005 (top) and 2019 (bottom).

Cradle of Filth are an English extreme metal band from Suffolk. Formed in 1991, the group originally consisted of vocalist Dani Filth (real name Daniel Davey), guitarist Paul Ryan, bassist Jon Pritchard, keyboardist Benjamin Ryan (brother of Paul Ryan) and drummer Darren "Daz" Gardner. The band's current lineup includes Filth alongside drummer Martin "Marthus" Škaroupka (since 2006), bassist Daniel Firth (since 2012), and guitarists Donny Burbage (since 2022) and Joff Bailey (since 2026).

== History ==
=== 1991–1999 ===
Cradle of Filth (COF) were formed in 1991 by Dani Filth with Paul Ryan, Jon Pritchard, Benjamin Ryan and Daz Gardner. After recording their first demo Invoking the Unclean, released in January 1992, the group added second guitarist Robin Graves (real name Robin Eaglestone), who debuted on their second demo tape Orgiastic Pleasures Foul. Shortly after its release, Pritchard left and Graves switched to the role of bassist, with Paul Allender brought in to take over on second guitar. The new lineup released Total Fucking Darkness at the end of 1992, after which Gardner left the group. He was replaced by William "Was" Sarginson. During a tour alongside Emperor in 1993, Sarginson was replaced by Nick Barker. Around the same time, the band added Andrea Meyer as their first female backup vocalist.

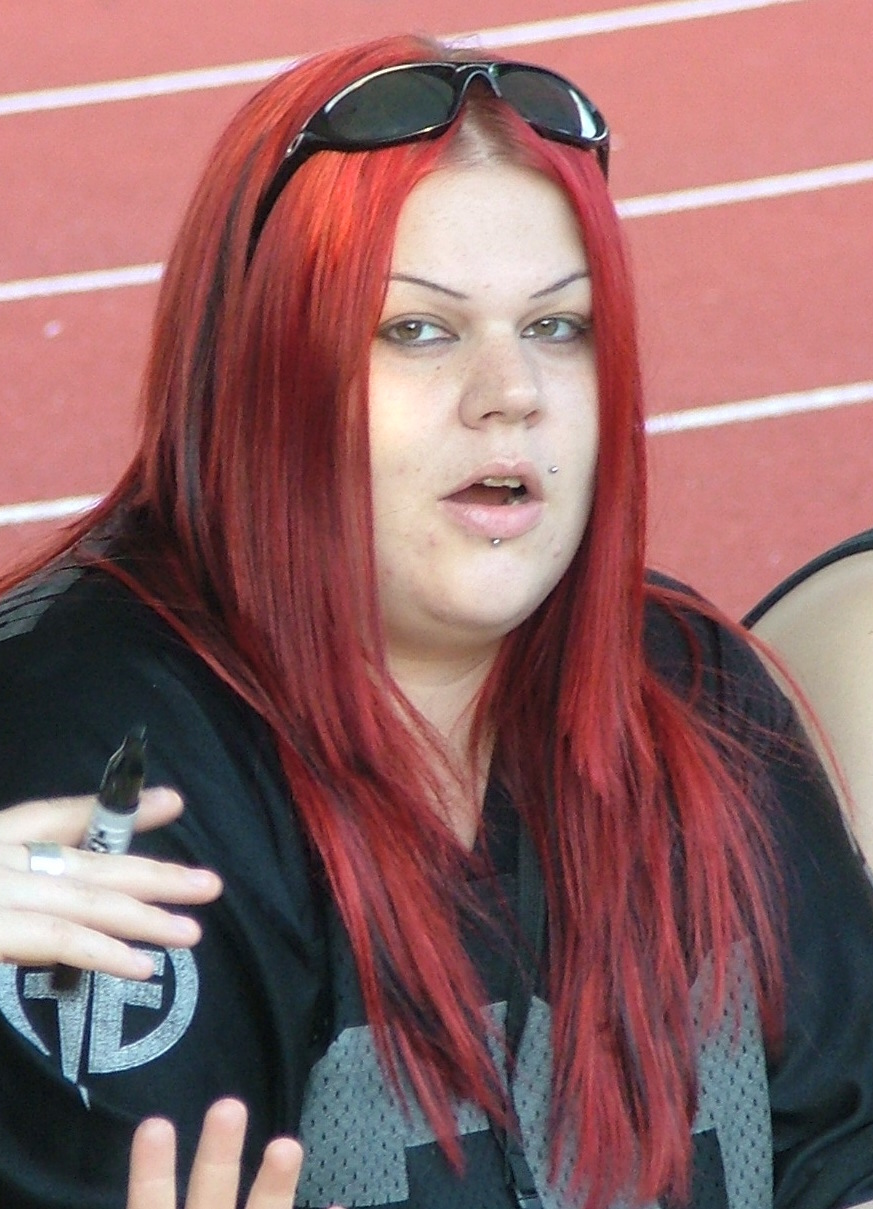
Sarah Jezebel Deva was Cradle of Filth's female vocalist from 1994 until 2008.

During the tour with Emperor, COF signed with new label Cacophonous Records. Later in 1993, they recorded their debut full-length album The Principle of Evil Made Flesh, which was released early the next year. After touring throughout 1994, COF recorded their planned second album for Cacophonous in 1995, with Sarah Jezebel Deva (real name Sarah Ferridge) taking over from Meyer and bassist Jon Kennedy joining in place of Graves. However, due to legal disputes the album was not released, and the band eventually parted ways with the label, during which time the Ryan brothers, Allender and Kennedy all left the band. The collection was later released as Dusk and Her Embrace: The Original Sin in 2016. During the autumn, guitarist Stuart Anstis, returning bassist Graves, and keyboardist Damien Gregori all joined the band.

With their new lineup, COF released V Empire or Dark Faerytales in Phallustein on Cacophonous and Dusk and Her Embrace on Music for Nations in 1996. Gian Pyres (real name Gianpiero Piras) took over as second guitarist during the recording of Dusk and Her Embrace, but did not perform on the album. In the summer of 1997, Gregori was dismissed from the group. He was replaced by Les "Lecter" Smith, who debuted along with Pyres on 1998's Cruelty and the Beast.

=== 1999–2012 ===
Nicholas Barker left in early 1999 to join Dimmu Borgir. He was initially replaced by Was Sarginson, then briefly by Dave Kunt (real name Dave Hirschheimer), and finally by Adrian Erlandsson that summer. In July 1999, after the recording of EP From the Cradle to Enslave, Gian Pyres also left. By October, Stuart Anstis and Les Smith had also parted ways with the group — the former reportedly sacked. Shortly after their departures, a new lineup was announced including returning guitarists Paul Allender and Pyres. After initially touring with Mark Newby-Robson on keyboards, the band brought in Martin Powell as Smith's permanent replacement.

After the band released Midian in 2000, Bitter Suites to Succubi in 2001 and Live Bait for the Dead in 2002, their next lineup change came in July 2001 when long-term bassist Robin Graves left for "personal reasons". He was replaced by Dave Pybus, initially on a temporary basis but later permanently. Pyres left the group for a second time in August 2002. After the recording of Damnation and a Day, he was replaced by James McIlroy. Nymphetamine was released in 2004, before Pybus left for "personal reasons" in January 2005. Powell followed in May, citing similar reasons for his departure. McIlroy left in August, with Pybus returning on bass and his replacement Charles Hedger taking over the vacated guitar role.

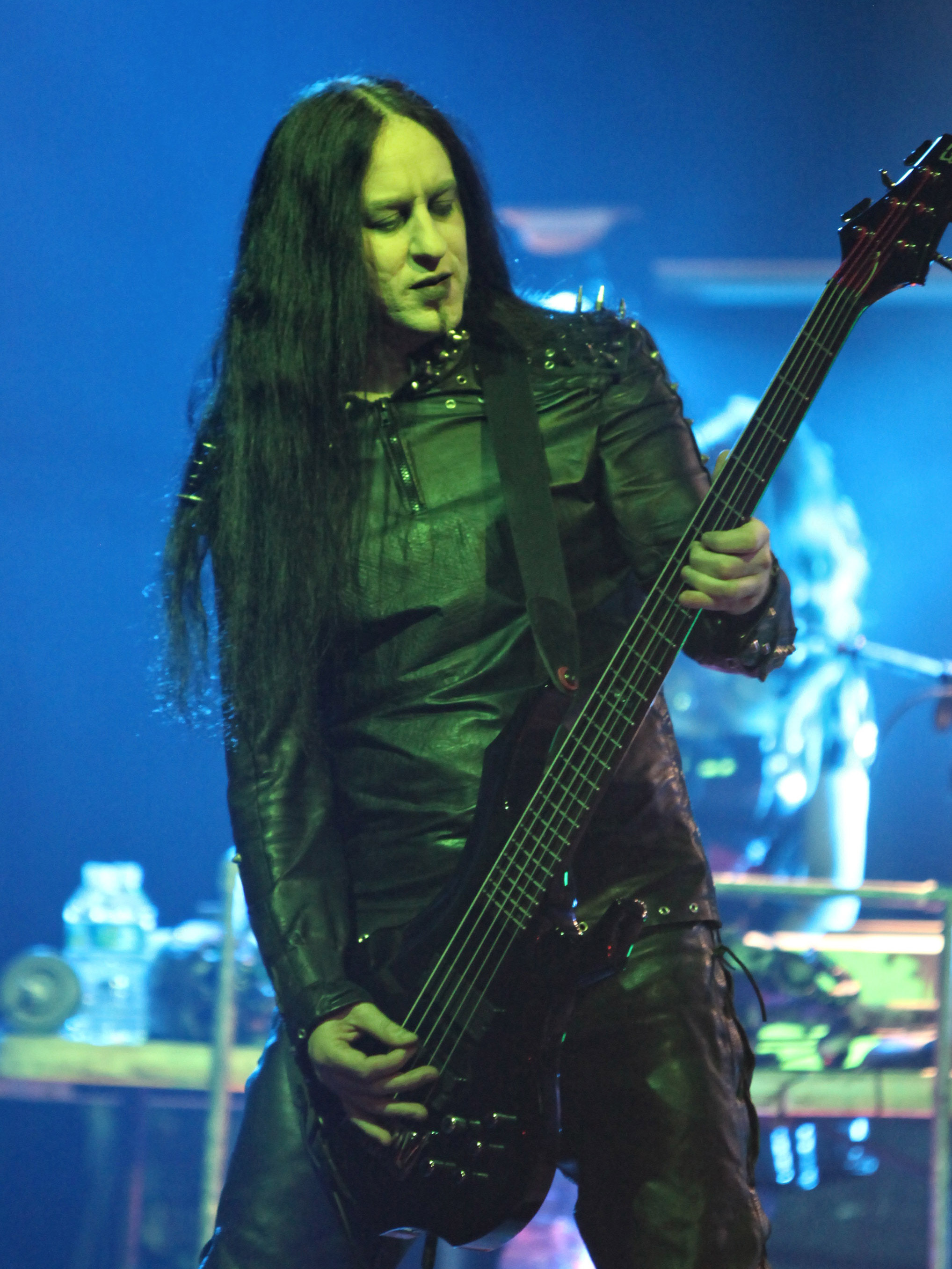
Dave Pybus replaced Robin Graves in 2001 and was the band's bassist until 2012.

Thornography was recorded with former touring keyboardist Mark Newby-Robson, while Rosie Smith handled keyboards on a touring basis. Shortly after the album's October 2006 release, Erlandsson left to focus on his work in two side projects. He was replaced by Martin "Marthus" Škaroupka. The 2008 follow-up Godspeed on the Devil's Thunder was recorded by the core quartet of Filth, Allender, Pybus and Škaroupka (along with Deva), as Hedger had stepped back into a touring only role. Shortly after its release, Deva left the band after a series of altercations with Filth. By the summer of 2009, Hedger and Smith had been replaced by returning guitarist McIlroy and new keyboardist Ashley Ellyllon (who also handled Deva's vocals), respectively. Ellyllon performed on 2010's Darkly, Darkly, Venus Aversa, before she was replaced by Caroline Campbell in early 2011. By the time the band started recording The Manticore and Other Horrors in spring 2012, Campbell had left and Pybus had been replaced by Daniel Firth.

=== Since 2012 ===
During the touring cycle for The Manticore and Other Horrors, COF added Lindsay Schoolcraft as their new keyboardist and second vocalist in early 2013. She was made an official full-time member the following year. During a co-headlining tour with Behemoth in February 2014, Allender and McIlroy were replaced by Richard Shaw and Marek "Ashok" Šmerda due to "hugely important family matters" and "serious neck surgery," respectively. Upon returning from the tour, the group began working on a new record ahead of schedule, later announcing the departure of Allender in the summer. McIlroy was ultimately unable to return due to ongoing problems with his neck injury, so both replacement guitarists remained in the group. The new lineup released Hammer of the Witches in 2015 and Cryptoriana: The Seductiveness of Decay in 2017.

In February 2020, Schoolcraft announced that she had left COF, writing in an online release that "it was the best thing to do for my well-being and mental health". She was replaced by Anabelle Iratni, who performed on new album Existence Is Futile but was not unveiled until her live debut the following May. In May 2022, the departures of Richard Shaw and Iratni were announced. At the same time, Donny Burbage joined as the new guitarist with Zoe Marie Federoff as the new keyboard player. Federoff announced her departure from Cradle of Filth on 24 August 2025. The same day, the band played a show with crew member Kelsey Peters in her place. A couple of days later, Federoff's husband Šmerda announced that he too would leave the band at the end of their Latin American tour in September. He was fired from the band on the same day. Jiří Háb was his touring replacement for the South American tour. Joff Bailey was later announced as the band's new member on 4 May 2026.

== Members ==
=== Current ===
Image	Name (real name)	Years active	Instruments	Release contributions
	Dani Filth (Daniel Davey)	1991–present	lead vocals	all Cradle of Filth (COF) releases
	Martin "Marthus" Škaroupka	2006–present	drums; keyboards	all COF releases from Godspeed on the Devil's Thunder (2008) onwards (except Dusk and Her Embrace: The Original Sin)
	Daniel Firth	2012–present	bass	all COF releases from The Manticore and Other Horrors (2012) onwards (except Dusk and Her Embrace: The Original Sin)
	Donny Burbage	2022–present	guitar	The Screaming of the Valkyries (2025)
	Joff Bailey	2026–present	guitar	—N/a

=== Former ===
Image	Name (real name)	Years active	Instruments	Release contributions
	Paul Ryan	1991–1995	guitar	all COF releases from Invoking the Unclean (1992) to The Principle of Evil Made Flesh (1994); Dusk and Her Embrace: The Original Sin (recorded 1995, released 2016)
	Benjamin Ryan	1991–1995	keyboards	all COF releases from Invoking the Unclean (1992) to The Principle of Evil Made Flesh (1994); Dusk and Her Embrace: The Original Sin (recorded 1995, released 2016)
	Darren "Daz" Gardner	1991–1992	drums	Invoking the Unclean (1992); Orgiastic Pleasures Foul (1992); Total Fucking Darkness (1992)
	Jon Pritchard	1991–1992	bass	Invoking the Unclean (1992); Orgiastic Pleasures Foul (1992)
	Robin Graves (Robin Eaglestone)	1991–1994; 1995–2001	guitar (1991–1992); bass (1992 onwards)	Invoking the Unclean (1992); all COF releases from Total Fucking Darkness (1992) to Live Bait for the Dead (2002)
	Paul Allender	1992–1995; 1999–2014	guitar	Total Fucking Darkness (1992); The Principle of Evil Made Flesh (1994); all COF releases from Midian (2000) to The Manticore and Other Horrors (2012); Dusk and Her Embrace: The Original Sin (recorded 1995, released 2016)
	William "Was" Sarginson	1992–1993; 1999 (session)	drums	From the Cradle to Enslave (1999)
	Nick Barker	1993–1999	drums	all COF releases from The Principle of Evil Made Flesh (1994) to From the Cradle to Enslave (1999); Dusk and Her Embrace: The Original Sin (recorded 1995, released 2016)
	Andrea Meyer	1993–1994 (died 2021)	female vocals	The Principle of Evil Made Flesh (1994)
	Jon Kennedy	1994–1995 (died 2023)	bass	Dusk and Her Embrace: The Original Sin (recorded 1995, released 2016)
	Stuart Anstis	1995–1999 (died 2022)	guitar	all COF releases from V Empire or Dark Faerytales in Phallustein (1996) to From the Cradle to Enslave (1999)
	Damien Gregori (Greg Moffitt)	1995–1997	keyboards	V Empire or Dark Faerytales in Phallustein (1996); Dusk and Her Embrace (1996)
	Gian Pyres (Gianpiero Piras)	1995–1999; 1999–2002	guitar	all COF releases from Cruelty and the Beast (1998) to Live Bait for the Dead (2002)
	Les "Lecter" Smith	1997–1999	keyboards	Cruelty and the Beast (1998); From the Cradle to Enslave (1999)
	Adrian Erlandsson	1999–2006	drums	all COF releases from From the Cradle to Enslave (1999) to Thornography (2006)
	Martin Powell	2000–2005	keyboards; violin; guitar	all COF releases from Midian (2000) to Nymphetamine (2004)
	Dave Pybus	2001–2005; 2005–2012	bass; backing vocals	all COF releases from Damnation and a Day (2003) to Evermore Darkly (2011)
	James McIlroy	2003–2005; 2009–2014	guitar	Nymphetamine (2004); Darkly, Darkly, Venus Aversa (2010); Evermore Darkly (2011)
	Charles Hedger	2005–2009 (touring only from 2006 onwards)	bass (early–mid 2005); guitar (mid-2005 onwards)	Thornography (2006)
	Ashley Ellyllon (Ashley Jurgemeyer)	2009–2011	keyboards; female vocals	Darkly, Darkly, Venus Aversa (2010)
	Caroline Campbell	2011–2012	keyboards; female vocals	Evermore Darkly (2011)
	Lindsay Schoolcraft	2013–2020	keyboards; female vocals	Hammer of the Witches (2015); Cryptoriana: The Seductiveness of Decay (2017); Trouble and Their Double Lives (2023)
	Marek "Ashok" Šmerda	2014–2025	guitar	all COF releases from Hammer of the Witches (2015) to The Screaming of the Valkyries (2025) (except Dusk and Her Embrace: The Original Sin)
	Richard Shaw	2014–2022	guitar	all COF releases from Hammer of the Witches (2015) to Trouble and Their Double Lives (2023)
	Anabelle Iratni	2020–2022	keyboards; female vocals	Existence Is Futile (2021)
	Zoe Marie Federoff	2022–2025	keyboards; female vocals	The Screaming of the Valkyries (2025)

=== Touring and session ===
Image	Name (real name)	Years active	Instruments	Details
	Danielle Cneajna Cottington	1994–1998 (session)	female vocals	Cottington appeared as a featured backing vocalist on a string of studio recordings in the 1990s.
	Rishi Mehta	1994 (touring)	guitar	Mehta, who was also the band's manager, briefly performed with Cradle of Filth in 1994.
	Bryan Hipp (as "Jared Demeter")	1994–1995 (touring; died 2006)	guitar	Hipp and McGlone each performed on tour, portraying the character "Jared Demeter".
	Sarah Jezebel Deva (Sarah Ferridge)	1994–2008	female vocals	all COF releases from V Empire or Dark Faerytales in Phallustein (1996) to Godspeed on the Devil's Thunder (2008); Midnight in the Labyrinth (2012); Dusk and Her Embrace: The Original Sin (2016)
	Paul McGlone (as "Jared Demeter")	1996 (touring)	guitar	
	Dave Kunt (Dave Hirschheimer)	1999 (session)	drums	Hirschheimer took over from Was Sarginson for a brief period, before Adrian Erlandsson joined.
	Darren Donnarumma (as "Jared Demeter")	1999 (touring)	guitar	Donnarumma performed at several shows in 1999, after the departure of Gian Pyres.
	Mark Newby-Robson	1999–2000 (touring); 2006–2011 (session)	keyboards	Newby-Robson took over briefly from Les Smith, and later became a studio contributor.
	Rosie Smith	2005–2009 (touring)	keyboards; female vocals	After Martin Powell's departure in 2005, Smith took over as COF's keyboardist for live shows. She also doubled on female vocals after Sarah Jezebel Deva's departure.
	Kelsey Peters	2025–present (touring)	keyboards; female vocals	After Federoff departed from the band in the middle of their Latin American tour in August 2025, Peters took over as Cradle of Filth's keyboardist for the remainder of the tour.
	Jiří Háb	2025–2026 (touring)	guitars	After Šmerda was fired in the middle of their Latin American tour in August 2025, Háb took over Cradle's guitarist role for the remainder of the tour.

== Lineups ==
Period	Members	Releases
1991–early 1992	Dani Filth — vocals; Paul Ryan — guitars; Jon Pritchard — bass; Benjamin Ryan — keyboards; Darren Gardner — drums	Invoking the Unclean (1992)
Early–mid 1992	Dani Filth — vocals; Paul Ryan — lead guitar; Jon Pritchard — bass; Benjamin Ryan — keyboards; Darren Gardner — drums; Robin Graves — rhythm guitar	Orgiastic Pleasures Foul (1992)
Mid–late 1992	Dani Filth — vocals; Paul Ryan — guitars; Robin Graves — bass; Benjamin Ryan — keyboards; Darren Gardner — drums; Paul Allender — guitars	Total Fucking Darkness (1992)
Late 1992–summer 1993	Dani Filth — vocals; Paul Ryan — guitars; Robin Graves — bass; Benjamin Ryan — keyboards; Paul Allender — guitars; Was Sarginson — drums	none
Summer 1993–late 1994	Dani Filth — lead vocals; Paul Ryan — guitars; Robin Graves — bass; Benjamin Ryan — keyboards; Paul Allender — guitars; Nick Barker — drums; Andrea Meyer — female vocals	The Principle of Evil Made Flesh (1994)
Late 1994–summer 1995	Dani Filth — lead vocals; Paul Ryan — guitars; Benjamin Ryan — keyboards; Paul Allender — guitars; Nick Barker — drums; Sarah Jezebel Deva — female vocals; Jon Kennedy — bass	Dusk and Her Embrace: The Original Sin (1995, released 2016)
Autumn–late 1995	Dani Filth — lead vocals; Nick Barker — drums; Sarah Jezebel Deva — female vocals; Stuart Anstis — guitars; Robin Graves — bass; Damien Gregori — keyboards	V Empire or Dark Faerytales in Phallustein (1996); Dusk and Her Embrace (1996)
Late 1995–summer 1997	Dani Filth — lead vocals; Nick Barker — drums; Sarah Jezebel Deva — female vocals; Stuart Anstis — guitars; Robin Graves — bass; Damien Gregori — keyboards; Gian Pyres — guitars	none
Summer 1997–early 1999	Dani Filth — lead vocals; Nick Barker — drums; Sarah Jezebel Deva — female vocals; Stuart Anstis — guitars; Robin Graves — bass; Gian Pyres — guitars; Les Smith — keyboards	Cruelty and the Beast (1998); PanDaemonAeon (1999); From the Cradle to Enslave (1999) – one track
Early–spring 1999	Dani Filth — lead vocals; Sarah Jezebel Deva — female vocals; Stuart Anstis — guitars; Robin Graves — bass; Gian Pyres — guitars; Les Smith — keyboards; Was Sarginson — drums (temporary)	From the Cradle to Enslave (1999) – three tracks
Spring–summer 1999	Dani Filth — lead vocals; Sarah Jezebel Deva — female vocals; Stuart Anstis — guitars; Robin Graves — bass; Gian Pyres — guitars; Les Smith — keyboards; Dave Kunt — drums (temporary)	none
June–July 1999	Dani Filth — lead vocals; Sarah Jezebel Deva — female vocals; Stuart Anstis — guitars; Robin Graves — bass; Gian Pyres — guitars; Les Smith — keyboards; Adrian Erlandsson — drums	From the Cradle to Enslave (1999) – two tracks
July–October 1999	Dani Filth — lead vocals; Sarah Jezebel Deva — female vocals; Stuart Anstis — guitars; Robin Graves — bass; Les Smith — keyboards; Adrian Erlandsson — drums	none
November 1999–early 2000	Dani Filth — lead vocals; Sarah Jezebel Deva — female vocals; Robin Graves — bass; Adrian Erlandsson — drums; Paul Allender — guitars; Gian Pyres — guitars; Mark Newby-Robson — keyboards (touring)	none
Early 2000–July 2001	Dani Filth — lead vocals; Sarah Jezebel Deva — female vocals; Robin Graves — bass; Adrian Erlandsson — drums; Paul Allender — guitars; Gian Pyres — guitars; Martin Powell — keyboards, violin	Midian (2000); Bitter Suites to Succubi (2001); Heavy, Left-Handed and Candid (2001); Live Bait for the Dead (2002)
July 2001–August 2002	Dani Filth — lead vocals; Sarah Jezebel Deva — female vocals; Adrian Erlandsson — drums; Paul Allender — guitars; Gian Pyres — guitars; Martin Powell — keyboards, violin; Dave Pybus — bass	none
August 2002–early 2003	Dani Filth — lead vocals; Sarah Jezebel Deva — female vocals; Adrian Erlandsson — drums; Paul Allender — guitars; Martin Powell — keyboards, violin, guitars; Dave Pybus — bass	Damnation and a Day (2003)
Early 2003–January 2005	Dani Filth — lead vocals; Sarah Jezebel Deva — female vocals; Adrian Erlandsson — drums; Paul Allender — guitars; Martin Powell — keyboards, violin, guitars; Dave Pybus — bass; James McIlroy — guitars	Nymphetamine (2004)
January–May 2005	Dani Filth — lead vocals; Sarah Jezebel Deva — female vocals; Adrian Erlandsson — drums; Paul Allender — guitars; Martin Powell — keyboards, violin, guitars; James McIlroy — guitars; Charles Hedger — bass	Peace Through Superior Firepower (2005)
May–August 2005	Dani Filth — lead vocals; Sarah Jezebel Deva — female vocals; Adrian Erlandsson — drums; Paul Allender — guitars; James McIlroy — guitars; Charles Hedger — bass; Rosie Smith — keyboards (touring)	none
August 2005–November 2006	Dani Filth — lead vocals; Sarah Jezebel Deva — female vocals; Adrian Erlandsson — drums; Paul Allender — guitars; Charles Hedger — guitars; Rosie Smith — keyboards (touring); Dave Pybus — bass	Thornography (2006)
November 2006–November 2008	Dani Filth — lead vocals; Sarah Jezebel Deva — female vocals; Paul Allender — guitars; Rosie Smith — keyboards (touring); Dave Pybus — bass; Marthus — drums	Godspeed on the Devil's Thunder (2008)
November 2008–spring 2009	Dani Filth — vocals; Paul Allender — guitars; Charles Hedger — guitars; Rosie Smith — keyboards, female vocals; Dave Pybus — bass; Marthus — drums	none
Spring 2009–early 2011	Dani Filth — lead vocals; Paul Allender — guitars; Dave Pybus — bass; Marthus — drums, keyboards; James McIlroy — guitars; Ashley Ellyllon — keyboards, female vocals	Darkly, Darkly, Venus Aversa (2010)
Early 2011–early 2012	Dani Filth — lead vocals; Paul Allender — guitars; Dave Pybus — bass; Marthus — drums, keyboards; James McIlroy — guitars; Caroline Campbell — keyboards, female vocals	Evermore Darkly (2011)
Spring 2012–spring 2013	Dani Filth — vocals; Paul Allender — guitars; Marthus — drums, keyboards; James McIlroy — guitars; Daniel Firth — bass	The Manticore and Other Horrors (2012) (does not feature James McIlroy)
Spring 2013–summer 2014	Dani Filth — lead vocals; Paul Allender — guitars; Marthus — drums, keyboards; James McIlroy — guitars; Daniel Firth — bass; Lindsay Schoolcraft — keyboards, female vocals	none
Summer 2014–February 2020	Dani Filth — lead vocals; Marthus — drums, keyboards; Daniel Firth — bass; Lindsay Schoolcraft — keyboards, female vocals; Richard Shaw — guitars; Ashok — guitars	Hammer of the Witches (2015); Cryptoriana: The Seductiveness of Decay (2017); Trouble and Their Double Lives (2023)
Early 2020–May 2022	Dani Filth — lead vocals; Marthus — drums, keyboards; Daniel Firth — bass; Richard Shaw — guitars; Ashok — guitars; Anabelle Iratni — keyboards, female vocals	Existence Is Futile (2021)
May 2022–August 2025	Dani Filth — lead vocals; Marthus — drums, keyboards; Daniel Firth — bass; Ashok — guitars; Donny Burbage — guitars; Zoe Marie Federoff — keyboards, female vocals	The Screaming of the Valkyries (2025)
August 2025	Dani Filth — lead vocals; Marthus — drums, keyboards; Daniel Firth — bass; Ashok — guitars; Donny Burbage — guitars; Kelsey Peters — keyboards, female vocals	none
August 2025	Dani Filth — lead vocals; Marthus — drums, keyboards; Daniel Firth — bass; Donny Burbage — guitars; Kelsey Peters — keyboards, female vocals	none
September 2025–May 2026	Dani Filth — lead vocals; Marthus — drums, keyboards; Daniel Firth — bass; Donny Burbage — guitars; Kelsey Peters — keyboards, female vocals; Jiří Háb — guitars	none
May 2026–present	Dani Filth — lead vocals; Marthus — drums, keyboards; Daniel Firth — bass; Donny Burbage — guitars; Kelsey Peters — keyboards, female vocals; Joff Bailey — guitars	none

== Recording ==
Album	Lead vocals	Guitar 1	Guitar 2	Bass	Drums	Keyboards	Female vocals
Invoking the Unclean	Dani Filth	Robin Graves	Paul Ryan	Jon Pritchard	Darren Garden	Benjamin Ryan	
Orgiastic Pleasures Fool	Dani Filth	Paul Ryan		Jon Pritchard	Darren Garden	Benjamin Ryan	
Total Fucking Darkness	Dani Filth	Paul Allender	Paul Ryan	Robin Graves	Darren Garden	Benjamin Ryan	
The Principle of Evil Made Flesh	Dani Filth	Paul Allender	Paul Ryan	Robin Graves	Nick Barker	Benjamin Ryan	Andrea Meyer
V Empire or Dark Faerytales in Phallustein	Dani Filth	Stuart Anstis		Robin Graves	Nick Barker	Damien Gregori	Sarah Jezebel Deva
Dusk and Her Embrace	Dani Filth	Stuart Anstis		Robin Graves	Nick Barker	Damien Gregori	Sarah Jezebel Deva
Cruelty and the Beast	Dani Filth	Stuart Anstis	Gian Pyres	Robin Graves	Nick Barker	Lecter	Sarah Jezebel Deva
From the Cradle to Enslave	Dani Filth	Stuart Anstis	Gian Pyres	Robin Graves	Was Sarginson (3 tracks); Adrian Erlandsson (2 tracks); Nick Barker (1 track)	Lecter	Sarah Jezebel Deva
Midian	Dani Filth	Paul Allender	Gian Pyres	Robin Graves	Adrian Erlandsson	Martin Powell	Sarah Jezebel Deva
Bitter Suites to Succubi	Dani Filth	Paul Allender	Gian Pyres	Robin Eaglestone	Adrian Erlandsson	Martin Powell	Sarah Jezebel Deva
Damnation and a Day	Dani Filth	Paul Allender		Dave Pybus	Adrian Erlandsson	Martin Powell	Sarah Jezebel Deva
Nymphetamine	Dani Filth	Paul Allender	James McIlroy	Dave Pybus	Adrian Erlandsson	Martin Powell	Sarah Jezebel Deva/Liv Kristine Espenæs Krull
Thornography	Dani Filth	Paul Allender	Charles Hedger	Dave Pybus	Adrian Erlandsson	Mark Newby-Robson/Christopher Jon	Sarah Jezebel Deva
Godspeed on the Devil's Thunder	Dani Filth	Paul Allender		Dave Pybus	Martin "Marthus" Škaroupka	Mark Newby-Robson	Sarah Jezebel Deva/Carolyn Gretton
Darkly, Darkly, Venus Aversa	Dani Filth	Paul Allender	James McIlroy	Dave Pybus	Martin "Marthus" Škaroupka	Ashley Ellyllon	
Evermore Darkly	Dani Filth	Paul Allender	James McIlroy	Dave Pybus	Martin "Marthus" Škaroupka	Caroline Campbell	
Midnight in the Labyrinth	Dani Filth					Mark Newby-Robson	Sarah Jezebel Deva
The Manticore and Other Horrors	Dani Filth	Paul Allender		Daniel Firth	Martin "Marthus" Škaroupka	Martin "Marthus" Škaroupka	Lucy Atkins
Hammer of the Witches	Dani Filth	Richard Shaw	Marek 'Ashok' Šmerda	Daniel Firth	Martin "Marthus" Škaroupka	Martin "Marthus" Škaroupka	Lindsay Schoolcraft
Cryptoriana – The Seductiveness of Decay	Dani Filth	Richard Shaw	Marek 'Ashok' Šmerda	Daniel Firth	Martin "Marthus" Škaroupka	Martin "Marthus" Škaroupka	Lindsay Schoolcraft
Existence Is Futile	Dani Filth	Richard Shaw	Marek 'Ashok' Šmerda	Daniel Firth	Martin "Marthus" Škaroupka	Anabelle Iratni	
The Screaming of the Valkyries	Dani Filth	Donny Burbage	Marek 'Ashok' Šmerda	Daniel Firth	Martin "Marthus" Škaroupka	Zoe Marie Federoff	
