= The Gospel of Filth =

Book by Gavin Baddeley and Dani Filth

- Author: Gavin Baddeley & Dani Filth
- Cover artist: Stu Williamson
- Language: English
- Subject: Cradle of Filth and its influences
- Genre: Reference
- Publisher: FAB Press
- Publication date: March 2010
- Publication place: United Kingdom
- Media type: Print (Paperback)
- Pages: 512
- ISBN: 978-1-903254-50-9

The Gospel of Filth (variously subtitled "A Black Metal Bible" and "A Bible of Decadence & Darkness") is a book by Dani Filth and Gavin Baddeley, documenting the history of the band Cradle of Filth and its cultural influences. The official synopsis describes it as a "wide-ranging and witty dissection of the uncanny and unholy". Taking music as its obvious entry point, the book also covers films, literature, comics and even computer games.

Dani Filth explained the concept behind the book as follows:

Each chapter, while loosely based around the band, our ideals and aesthetics, explores the ideas behind an album we've done. It's thoroughly researched and mostly written by Gavin Baddeley, a reverend in the Church of Satan. It's morbid but retains a level of tomfoolery; you can read it and chuckle.

Various editions – some limited – have been published both in hardcover and paperback.

== Chapters ==
No.	Title	Length
1.	"Invoking the Unclean: Esoteric England" (Explores the "darker" parts of English history and culture.)
2.	"The Principle of Evil Made Flesh: The Femme Fatale" (Artists who have "celebrated the association of femininity and wickedness".)
3.	"V Empire: Childhood Nightmares" (The dark heritage of fairy tales.)
4.	"Dusk and Her Embrace: The Gothic Aesthetic" (Cradle of Filth's gothic influences, from Lord Byron to the Batcave club.)
5.	"Cruelty and the Beast: Criminal Chic" (Charismatic criminals, from Cain to the modern serial killer.)
6.	"Midian: Horror" (Horror and monsters as entertainment.)
7.	"Damnation and a Day: Satanism" ("The development of Satanism, both as a covert philosophy and a pop culture phenomenon.")
8.	"Nymphetamine: Sex and Drugs" (A history of sex and drugs in relation to rock and roll.)
9.	"Harder, Darker, Faster: Arockalypse Now" (A history of heavy metal.)
10.	"Godspeed on the Devil's Thunder: The Black Arts" (An exploration of black magic.)
11.	"Live Bait for the Dead: Tour Bus Confessional" (Dani Filth's stories of Cradle of Filth on tour - included in special editions only.)
