= Lovecraft & Witch Hearts =

Compilation album by Cradle of Filth
- Released: 13 May 2002
- Recorded: 1996–2000
- Genre: Extreme metal
- Length: 72:52
- Label: Music for Nations
- Producer: Various

Cradle of Filth chronology
Bitter Suites to Succubi (2001)	Lovecraft & Witch Hearts (2002)	Live Bait for the Dead (2002)

Professional ratings
Review scores
Source	Rating
AllMusic	4.5/5 stars
Collector's Guide to Heavy Metal	7/10
Exclaim!	favourable

Lovecraft & Witch Hearts is a compilation album by English extreme metal band Cradle of Filth, released on 13 May 2002 by record label Music for Nations.

== Content ==
It is described in Dani Filth's sleeve notes as "a favoured grimoire of tracks coupled with the rare and unreleased; rather a 'mess of' than a 'best of'..." It was designed to round off Cradle of Filth's contract with Music for Nations before their short-lived signing to Sony Records.

Disc one (Lovecraft) consists of album tracks from their Music for Nations back catalogue (although the Cruelty and the Beast tracks "Beneath the Howling Stars" and "Cruelty Brought Thee Orchids" are remixes by longtime band studio collaborator Mike Exeter). Disc two (Witch Hearts) consists of extra tracks culled from limited and import editions of their MFN releases (e.g. the two-disc version of Cruelty and the Beast; however, the versions on here are slightly altered), along with some remixes.

== Release ==
Lovecraft & Witch Hearts was released on 13 May 2002. It reached number 95 in the UK Albums Chart.

The album was reissued in 2012 by record label The End.

== Track listing ==
Disc one: Lovecraft
No.	Title	Originally from	Length
1.	"Creatures That Kissed in Cold Mirrors"	Midian	3:01
2.	"Dusk and Her Embrace"	Dusk... and Her Embrace	6:08
3.	"Beneath the Howling Stars"	Cruelty and the Beast	7:37
4.	"Her Ghost in the Fog"	Midian	6:25
5.	"Funeral in Carpathia (Be Quick or Be Dead Version)"	From the Cradle to Enslave	8:07
6.	"The Twisted Nails of Faith"	Cruelty and the Beast	6:49
7.	"From the Cradle to Enslave"	From the Cradle to Enslave	6:34
8.	"Saffron's Curse"	Midian	6:22
9.	"Malice Through the Looking Glass"	Dusk... and Her Embrace	5:30
10.	"Cruelty Brought Thee Orchids"	Cruelty and the Beast	7:18
11.	"Lord Abortion"	Midian	6:51

Disc two: Witch Hearts
No.	Title	Length
1.	"Once upon Atrocity" (originally from Cruelty and the Beast)	1:46
2.	"Thirteen Autumns and a Widow (Red October Mix)"	7:14
3.	"For Those Who Died (Return to the Sabbat Mix)" (Sabbat cover)	6:15
4.	"Sodomy and Lust" (Sodom cover)	4:42
5.	"Twisting Further Nails (The Cruci-Fiction Mix)"	5:30
6.	"Amor e Morte (Lycanthropy Mix)"	7:14
7.	"Carmilla's Masque"	2:52
8.	"Lustmord and Wargasm II"	7:46
9.	"Dawn of Eternity" (Massacre cover)	6:18
10.	"Of Dark Blood and Fucking (Stripped to the Bone Mix)"	5:59
11.	"Dance Macabre" ("Saffron's Curse" remix)	4:27
12.	"Hell Awaits" (Slayer cover)	5:39
13.	"Hallowed Be Thy Name" (Iron Maiden cover)	7:10

== Personnel ==
Cradle of Filth

- Dani Filth – lead vocals
- Paul Allender – guitars
- Gian Pyres – guitars
- Robin Graves – bass
- Damien Gregori – keyboards
- Martin Foul – keyboards
- Lecter – keyboards
- Adrian Erlandsson – drums
- Nick Barker – drums

Guest/session musicians

- Sarah Jezebel Deva – female vocals
- Was Sarginson – drums

== Charts ==
Year	Chart	Position
2002	Top Independent Albums (USA)	45
2002	German Albums Chart	96
