= Godspeed on the Devil's Thunder =

Studio album by Cradle of Filth
- Released: 28 October 2008
- Recorded: March–June 2008
- Studios: Backstage Studios, Derbyshire, England
- Genre: Extreme metal
- Length: 71:22
- Label: Roadrunner
- Producers: Andy Sneap; Doug Cook; Cradle of Filth

Cradle of Filth chronology
Thornography (2006)	Godspeed on the Devil's Thunder (2008)	Darkly, Darkly, Venus Aversa (2010)

Singles from Godspeed on the Devil's Thunder
- 1. "Tragic Kingdom" Released: 2008; 2. "Honey and Sulphur" Released: 2008; 3. "The Death of Love" Released: 2009

Alternate cover
- Special edition cover

Godspeed on the Devil's Thunder (subtitled The Life and Crimes of Gilles de Rais) is the eighth studio album by English extreme metal band Cradle of Filth. It was released on 28 October 2008, through record label Roadrunner. It is the band's fourth concept album, after Cruelty and the Beast (1998), Midian (2000), and Damnation and a Day (2003), dealing with the life of the 15th-century French baron Gilles de Rais.

== Recording and production ==
The album was produced by Sabbat guitarist Andy Sneap, who had previously worked with Cradle of Filth while mixing the band's 2006 album, Thornography. Godspeed on the Devil's Thunder is Cradle of Filth's first album as a four-piece, rather than its usual six-man staple. It is also the last album to feature backing vocalist Sarah Jezebel Deva (although she briefly returned for Midnight in the Labyrinth in 2012) and the first to feature drummer Martin Škaroupka, replacing Adrian Erlandsson.

The band's official message boards revealed parts of an interview with guitarist Paul Allender, conducted by Média Matin Québec: "We already have four new songs ready and I have to say that they are... much faster than the songs on Thornography. [They] sound like old Cradle of Filth... A mixture of Midian and Dusk...." The interview goes on to state that the album will be followed by a European and American tour. Dani Filth has described the album as, "our most extreme, dramatic and deeply disturbing album to date. The legend of Gilles de Rais has been given fresh, vampyrical life in this conceptual meisterwerk, swathed in pitch-black magic and a viciousness unsurpassed in the annals of Cradle history. Screw what our detractors say, everyone who has heard this album has bruised their jaws on the pentagram-bejewelled floor."

In an interview with Blistering magazine, Filth revealed that three additional songs were recorded during the album sessions, among them an instrumental piece and a cover of Celtic Frost's "Into the Crypts of Rays". On the topic of their absence from the album, Filth has stated that they "were taken out so that the album wasn't too long. They'll turn up somewhere." They were ultimately included on the special edition.

== Content ==
In an interview published in February 2009, Dani talked about Gilles de Rais, and how his story manifests on Godspeed on the Devil's Thunder:

After Joan of Arc's death, he slid into a life of debauchery, which ended up with him trying to reclaim his fortune through alchemy and witchcraft. This led him to murder and kidnapping. He was eventually arrested by the Catholic Church and tried. It's a great gothic sort of fairytale story, because he's a very pious man at the beginning, turns extremely evil... The story runs concurrently throughout the album, it's not just vague ideas orbiting a main satellite. It's a story, and the narrative is actually taken from trial transcripts that were taken down in secular court at the time of his judgement.

The title of the album derives from a valediction vocalist Dani Filth once used to sign a letter.

Once again, Doug Bradley provides narration for the album (as with Midian, Nymphetamine and Thornography). The actor Tony Todd had initially been approached, but had quit the recording sessions over discomfort with the material.

== Promotion and release ==
On 21 July 2008, the band revealed the title and track listing of the new album. The track "Tragic Kingdom", was made available for free download by Roadrunner Records on 27 August, while 30-second samples of each track on the album were made available on Amazon.de on 27 September. The track "Honey and Sulphur" was the album's first single, and has been made available for purchase on the iTunes Store. A music video for the song was filmed at the Chislehurst Caves of Kent. In addition, "Midnight Shadows Crawl to Darken Counsel with Life" was available for streaming on the band's official website.

Godspeed on the Devil's Thunder was released on 28 October. The album peaked at number 48 on the Billboard 200 chart, with sales of a little over 11,000 copies. It reached number 73 in the UK Albums Chart. A special edition containing a bonus disc was also released.

A video for "The Death of Love" was released on 31 July 2009. Andy Sneap has mixed a new version of the song for the video.

== Critical reception ==
Professional ratings
Review scores
Source	Rating
AllMusic	2.5/5 stars
Blabbermouth.net	8/10 stars
Blistering	8/10 stars
ChartAttack	mixed
Chronicles of Chaos	7/10
IGN	7.2/10
Kerrang!	4/5 stars
Metal Storm	9/10 stars
PopMatters	5/10 stars
Terrorizer	8/10 stars

Godspeed on the Devil's Thunder has been generally well received by critics. Terrorizer called it "A much more cohesive, consistent and convincing album than Cradle have made for ages... Too samey to justify 71 minutes, but ultimately this is cracking..." Kerrang! called it "Grandiose, epic but still feral... eclipses the relatively weak Thornography... mixes scorching dynamics, atmosphere and overblown theatrics..." Metal Hammer wrote that it "Ticks all the band's usual boxes, while also boasting genuine narrative depth and real emotional resonance... Cradle's heaviest album yet and their strongest set of songs..."

== Track listing ==
All lyrics are written by Dani Filth; all music is composed by Paul Allender, Mark Newby-Robson and Cradle of Filth, except where indicated.

No.	Title	Length
1.	"In Grandeur and Frankincense Devilment Stirs" (instrumental)	2:27
2.	"Shat Out of Hell"	5:03
3.	"The Death of Love"	7:13
4.	"The 13th Caesar"	5:35
5.	"Tiffauges" (instrumental)	2:14
6.	"Tragic Kingdom"	5:59
7.	"Sweetest Maleficia"	5:59
8.	"Honey and Sulphur"	5:37
9.	"Midnight Shadows Crawl to Darken Counsel with Life"	8:58
10.	"Darkness Incarnate"	8:55
11.	"Ten Leagues Beneath Contempt"	4:58
12.	"Godspeed on the Devil's Thunder"	5:36
13.	"Corpseflower" (instrumental)	2:41

Limited edition bonus disc
No.	Title	Writer(s)	Length
1.	"Balsamic and Anathema"		6:05
2.	"A Thousand Hands on the Maid of Ruin" (instrumental)		8:04
3.	"Into the Crypt of Rays" (Celtic Frost cover)	Thomas Gabriel Fischer	4:10
4.	"Devil to the Metal"	Cradle of Filth	6:17
5.	"Courting Baphomet"	Cradle of Filth	5:17
6.	"The Love of Death" (remix)		5:13
7.	"The Death of Love" (demo)		7:16
8.	"The 13th Caesar" (demo)		5:27
9.	"Dirge Inferno" (live at Electric Factory, Philadelphia, 31 October 2007)	Cradle of Filth	6:45
10.	"Dusk and Her Embrace" (live at Electric Factory, Philadelphia, 31 October 2007)	Cradle of Filth	5:46
Total length:			60:20

== Personnel ==
Cradle of Filth

- Dani Filth – lead vocals
- Paul Allender – guitars, recording of demo tracks
- Dave Pybus – bass
- Martin "Marthus" Škaroupka – drums

Additional personnel

- Mark Newby-Robson – keyboards
- Carolyn Gretton – lead female vocals on "The Death of Love"
- Sarah Jezebel Deva – spoken voice, harmonies
- Stephen Svanholm – baritone voice
- Doug Bradley – lead narration
- Luna Scarlett Davey – narration
- Elissa Devins, Julie Devins, Leanne Harrison, Carolyn Gretton, Tonya Kay, Rachel Marshall-Clarke, Liz Willgoose, Laura Willgoose – choir

Technical personnel

- Andy Sneap – producer, engineer, mixing, mastering
- Doug Cook – producer, engineer
- Scott Atkins – engineer, mixing of live tracks
- "Devil to the Metal" and "Courting Baphomet" produced by Rob Caggiano and Cradle of Filth, engineered by Dan Turner
- Mark Harwood – engineering on demo tracks
- David Ho – album artwork
- Travis Smith – design
- Daragh McDonagh – sleeve photography
- Eternal Spirits – costumes in sleeve photography

== Charts ==
Year	Chart	Position
2008	Finnish Albums Chart	24
2008	German Albums Chart	37
2008	Australian Albums Chart	46
2008	Billboard 200 (USA)	48
2008	Swedish Albums Chart	49
2008	Ultratop Belgian Chart (Wallonia)	50
2008	Austrian Albums Chart	53
2008	GfK Dutch Chart	53
2008	Ultratop Belgian Chart (Flanders)	55
2008	Swiss Albums Chart	56
2008	French Albums Chart	64
2008	UK Albums Chart	73
2008	Oricon Japanese Albums Chart	143
