= Heavy, Left-Handed and Candid =

Video by Cradle of Filth
- Released: 30 April 2002
- Genre: Extreme metal
- Label: Abracadaver
- Director: Steve Graham

Cradle of Filth chronology
PanDaemonAeon (1999)	Heavy, Left-Handed and Candid (2002)	Babalon A.D. (So Glad for the Madness) (2003)

Professional ratings
Review scores
Source	Rating
AllMusic	3/5 stars

Heavy, Left-Handed and Candid is a DVD by English extreme metal band Cradle of Filth, featuring a concert from their 2001 Midian Tour as well as extras. It was released on 30 April 2002 by record label Abracadaver.

== Content ==
Eleven Burial Masses was filmed at Nottingham Rock City on 14 April 2001. The live album Live Bait for the Dead contains the same concert. The later release Eleven Burial Masses contains both the CD and DVD, though without the special features. Early copies of the DVD were signed by the band.

== Track listing ==
Eleven Burial Masses (Concert)

1. Lord Abortion (taken from Midian)
2. Ebony Dressed for Sunset (taken from V Empire)
3. The Forest Whispers My Name (taken from V Empire)
4. Cthulhu Dawn (taken from Midian)
5. Dusk and Her Embrace (taken from Dusk... and Her Embrace)
6. The Principle of Evil Made Flesh (taken from The Principle of Evil Made Flesh)
7. Cruelty Brought Thee Orchids (taken from Cruelty and the Beast)
8. Her Ghost in the Fog (taken from Midian)
9. Summer Dying Fast (taken from The Principle of Evil Made Flesh)
10. From the Cradle to Enslave (taken from From the Cradle to Enslave)
11. Queen of Winter, Throned (taken from V Empire)

Extras

1. "Sifting Through Filth: A Schlockumentary" – (58 minute documentary featuring tour footage and interviews)
2. "Scorched Earth Erotica: Nasty Version" (video taken from Bitter Suites to Succubi)
3. "Scorched Earth Erotica: Very Nasty Version" (video taken from Bitter Suites to Succubi)
4. "Born in a Burial Gown" (video taken from Bitter Suites to Succubi)
5. "The Blair Twit Project: Absinthe fiend footage"
6. Cradle of Fear—horror movie trailer
7. Circus of Horrors: "Creature Feature"
8. Gallery of the Grotesque (downloads and weblinks)
