= Damnation and a Day =

Studio album by Cradle of Filth
- Released: 10 March 2003
- Recorded: August–September 2002
- Studios: Parkgate Studios, Battle, East Sussex, and New Rising Studios, Peldon, England
- Genre: Extreme metal
- Length: 76:53
- Labels: Sony (Europe); Epic (US)
- Producers: Doug Cook and Cradle of Filth

Cradle of Filth chronology
| Live Bait for the Dead (2002) | Damnation and a Day (2003) | Nymphetamine (2004) |

Singles from Damnation and a Day
- 1. "Babalon A.D. (So Glad for the Madness)" Released: 3 March 2003; 2. "Mannequin" Released: 2 December 2003; 3. "The Promise of Fever" Released: 2003

Damnation and a Day (subtitled From Genesis to Nemesis...) is the fifth studio album by English extreme metal band Cradle of Filth. It was released on 10 March 2003 and is Cradle of Filth's only album on a major label, Sony, after which they transferred to Roadrunner. It features the one hundred and one-piece Budapest Film Orchestra including the forty-piece Budapest Film Choir. The album is partly based on John Milton's epic poem Paradise Lost.

== Background ==
In addition to the Miltonic arc, the album also features stand-alone tracks such as the Nile tribute "Doberman Pharaoh" and the Aleister Crowley-influenced "Babalon A.D. (So Glad for the Madness)".

== Recording ==
This is the first Cradle of Filth release since V Empire to feature only one full-time guitar player (Paul Allender), as former guitarist Gian Pyres quit the band shortly before the writing and recording process. Keyboardist Martin Powell played session guitars for the album as well as keyboards. This is also the first album to feature Dave Pybus on bass. He would go on to play on all of Cradle's subsequent releases until 2012. Narration on the first track of each section is by David McEwen, who played Kemper in the 2001 horror film Cradle of Fear (also starring Cradle frontman Dani Filth) and appeared in the video for "Her Ghost in the Fog", miming Doug Bradley's vocals.

A cover of Cliff Richard's "Devil Woman" was originally recorded during the Damnation and a Day sessions, but only surfaced on the special edition of Nymphetamine in 2005, re-recorded, with some of the lyrics altered ("feminine ways" became "nymphetamine ways").

The album's recording process was documented on Cradle's 2005 video release Peace Through Superior Firepower.

== Videos ==
The album spawned two DVD singles for the songs "Babalon A.D. (So Glad for the Madness)" and "Mannequin". The former was directed by Wiz (who had previously worked with Marilyn Manson), and was modelled on Pier Paolo Pasolini's film Salò; an adaptation of the Marquis de Sade's The 120 Days of Sodom. The latter, reminiscent of the films of Jan Švankmajer, was directed by Thomas Mignone, and featured stop motion animation by George Higham.

== Critical reception ==
Professional ratings
Review scores
| Source | Rating |
|---|---|
| AllMusic | 3/5 stars |
| Chronicles of Chaos | 6.5/10 |
| Collector's Guide to Heavy Metal | 6/10 |
| Encyclopedia of Popular Music | 3/5 stars |
| Entertainment Weekly | B+ |
| Metal.de | 7/10 |
| Metal Rules | 0.3/5 |
| Rock Hard | 8/10 |

Damnation and a Day received a mixed response from critics. AllMusic wrote, "[Damnation and a Day] has some grand-sounding moments, and is recorded cleanly, with the symphonic and operatic elements being perhaps its best. But it is endless, and only a true Filth fan could tell one song from another", ultimately calling it a "taxing, less-than-monumental work that won't win them many new mainstream fans, if that's at all what they had in mind." Influential extreme metal website Chronicles of Chaos wrote, "The songs are lengthy without exception, exploring multiple motifs, but the quality has been stretched out to breaking point. Whereas Midian offered us glossy slabs of great atmospheric metal, Damnation serves up overblown constructions that only capture your interest in sporadic bursts", before finishing with, "It is a real shame that Cradle's mainstream label debut should sound this misguided; one can painfully hear the effort that has been put into making Damnation and a Day a reality. What will sadden most CoF devotees is the reality that the insidious atmosphere that suffused The Principle of Evil Made Flesh through to Dusk... and Her Embrace has all but disappeared".

== Track listing ==
All lyrics are written by Dani Filth; all music is composed by Cradle of Filth (Dani Filth, Paul Allender, Martin Powell, Dave Pybus and Adrian Erlandsson).

I Fantasia Down
| No. | Title | Length |
|---|---|---|
| 1. | "A Bruise Upon the Silent Moon" | 2:03 |
| 2. | "The Promise of Fever" | 5:58 |
| 3. | "Hurt and Virtue" | 5:23 |
| 4. | "An Enemy Led the Tempest" | 6:11 |

II Paradise Lost
| No. | Title | Length |
|---|---|---|
| 5. | "Damned in Any Language (A Plague on Words)" | 1:58 |
| 6. | "Better to Reign in Hell" | 6:11 |
| 7. | "Serpent Tongue" | 5:10 |
| 8. | "Carrion" | 4:42 |

III Sewer Side Up
| No. | Title | Length |
|---|---|---|
| 9. | "The Mordant Liquor of Tears" | 2:35 |
| 10. | "Presents from the Poison-Hearted" | 6:19 |
| 11. | "Doberman Pharaoh" | 6:03 |
| 12. | "Babalon A.D. (So Glad for the Madness)" | 5:39 |

IV The Scented Garden
| No. | Title | Length |
|---|---|---|
| 13. | "A Scarlet Witch Lit the Season" | 1:34 |
| 14. | "Mannequin" | 4:27 |
| 15. | "Thank God for the Suffering" | 6:13 |
| 16. | "The Smoke of Her Burning" | 5:00 |
| 17. | "End of Daze" | 1:24 |
| Total length: | | 76:48 |

== Personnel ==
=== Cradle of Filth ===
- Dani Filth – lead vocals
- Paul Allender – guitars
- Martin Powell – keyboards, violin, guitars
- Dave Pybus – bass
- Adrian Erlandsson – drums
- Sarah Jezebel Deva – backing vocals

=== Additional personnel ===
- The Budapest Film Orchestra and Choir conducted by László Zádori
- David McEwen – narration on all "Intro" tracks except "The Mordant Liquor of Tears" and "A Scarlet Witch Lit the Season"
- Madame Slam – additional vocals

=== Production ===
- Doug Cook – producer, engineer, mixing engineer
- Dan Turner – assistant engineer
- Rob Caggiano – mixing with Cradle of Filth
- Steve Regina – mixing engineer
- Daniel Presley – orchestral arrangement
- John Coulthart – album sleeve illustration and design
- Stu Williamson – sleeve photography
- Sugar Babes – models
- Samantha Bond – model

== Charts ==
=== Album ===
| Year | Chart | Position |
|---|---|---|
| 2003 | Australian Albums (ARIA) | 47 |
| 2003 | Austrian Albums (Ö3 Austria) | 43 |
| 2003 | Belgian Albums (Ultratop Flanders) | 37 |
| 2003 | Belgian Albums (Ultratop Wallonia) | 44 |
| 2003 | Dutch Albums (Album Top 100) | 51 |
| 2003 | French Albums (SNEP) | 37 |
| 2003 | Finnish Albums (Suomen virallinen lista) | 10 |
| 2003 | German Albums (Offizielle Top 100) | 15 |
| 2003 | Japanese Albums (Oricon) | 126 |
| 2003 | Norwegian Albums (VG-lista) | 36 |
| 2003 | Scottish Albums (OCC) | 49 |
| 2003 | Swedish Albums (Sverigetopplistan) | 30 |
| 2003 | Swiss Albums (Schweizer Hitparade) | 81 |
| 2003 | UK Albums (OCC) | 44 |
| 2003 | UK Rock & Metal Albums (OCC) | 3 |
| 2003 | US Billboard 200 | 140 |
| 2003 | US Heatseekers Albums (Billboard) | 3 |
| 2003 | US Independent Albums (Billboard) | 8 |

=== Singles ===
| Year | Title | Chart | Position |
|---|---|---|---|
| 2003 | "Babalon A.D. (So Glad for the Madness)" | UK Singles Chart | 35 |
