= Dave Pybus =

British extreme metal musician

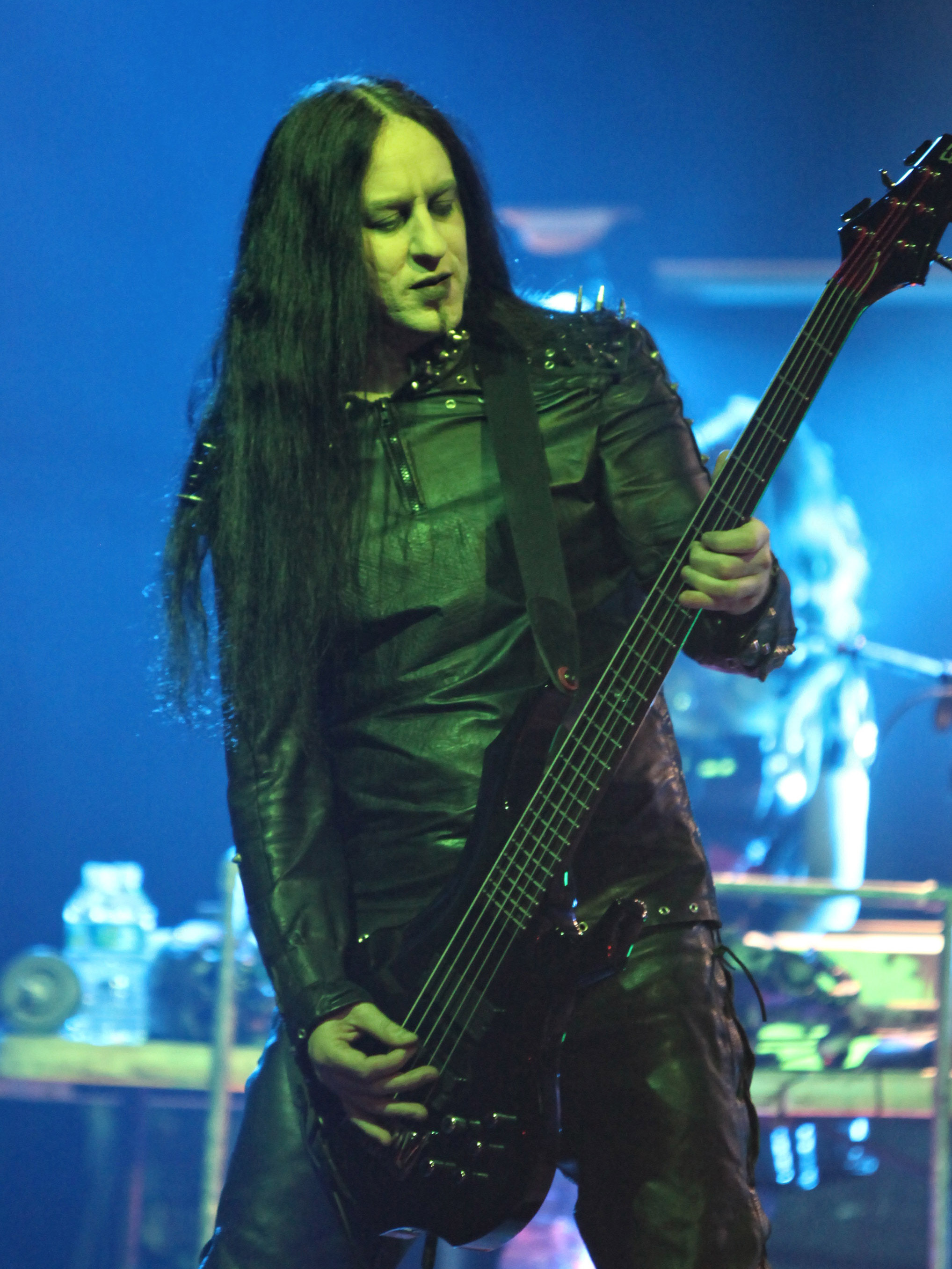
- Pybus performing with Cradle of Filth in 2011

Background information
- Born: 4 June 1970 (age 55)
- Origin: England
- Genres: Extreme metal
- Occupations: Musician, songwriter, graphic designer
- Instruments: Bass, vocals, guitar
- Label: Peaceville

Dave Pybus (born 4 June 1970) is an English extreme metal musician, best known as the former bass player of Cradle of Filth.

== Career ==
Pybus's first band was called Anul Death (1988–1991) which later changed its name to Darkened.

From 1990 to 1994, Pybus worked at Peaceville Records as a graphic designer. His name is credited on several records from that period including Darkthrone - A Blaze in the Northern Sky, Autopsy - Mental Funeral, My Dying Bride - As the Flower Withers and Turn Loose the Swans. He also worked with Vital Remains, Pitchshifter, Therion, Anathema, G.G.F.H., Kong, Paradise Lost, Banished, Pentagram, Ship of Fools, and At the Gates (first three albums). Around 1993, Peaceville signed a U.S. distribution deal with Caroline, where Pybus and Lyle Preslar worked together for over a year.

In 1991, Pybus formed Dreambreed, a band in which he provided vocals and played guitar. They were influenced by the Misfits and released a six-track mini CD titled Sometime in 1995. Pybus stayed in Dreambreed until 1998, when he joined Anathema on bass guitar. He stayed with Anathema until 2001, appearing on two albums – Judgement (1999) and A Fine Day to Exit (2001) – after which he sessioned and later joined Cradle of Filth, often operating under the stage name Herr Pubis, following the departure of bassist Robin "Graves" Eaglestone.

Pybus appeared on: Damnation and a Day (2003), Nymphetamine (2004), Thornography (2006), Godspeed on the Devil's Thunder (2008), Darkly, Darkly, Venus Aversa (2010).

In 2005, Pybus took a six-month break from Cradle of Filth and started Sixsixsix Records. In July, he was honoured with an appearance on the Roadrunner United CD alongside Peter Steele, Josh Silver, Steve Holt and Joey Jordison. After his break he re-joined Cradle of Filth and played bass on the debut Angtoria album, released in April 2006 via Listenable Records.

21 April 2008 saw the release of Dreambreed's Misery Sessions on CD, via Pybus' Sixsixsix Record label; the sessions were originally recorded in 1997.

Pybus launched his own monthly podcast Life Is a Hideous Thing in December 2014, running for 16 episodes, including four commissioned by Peaceville Records, and featuring guests such as Pat Mills, Dave McKean, Doug Bradley, among others. One episode was unpublished, featuring Paul "Hammy" Halmshaw. This was held back due to Hammy not being happy with the results and using the inspiration from the recording sessions to write his book Peaceville Life, released in 2016.

=== Guest appearances ===
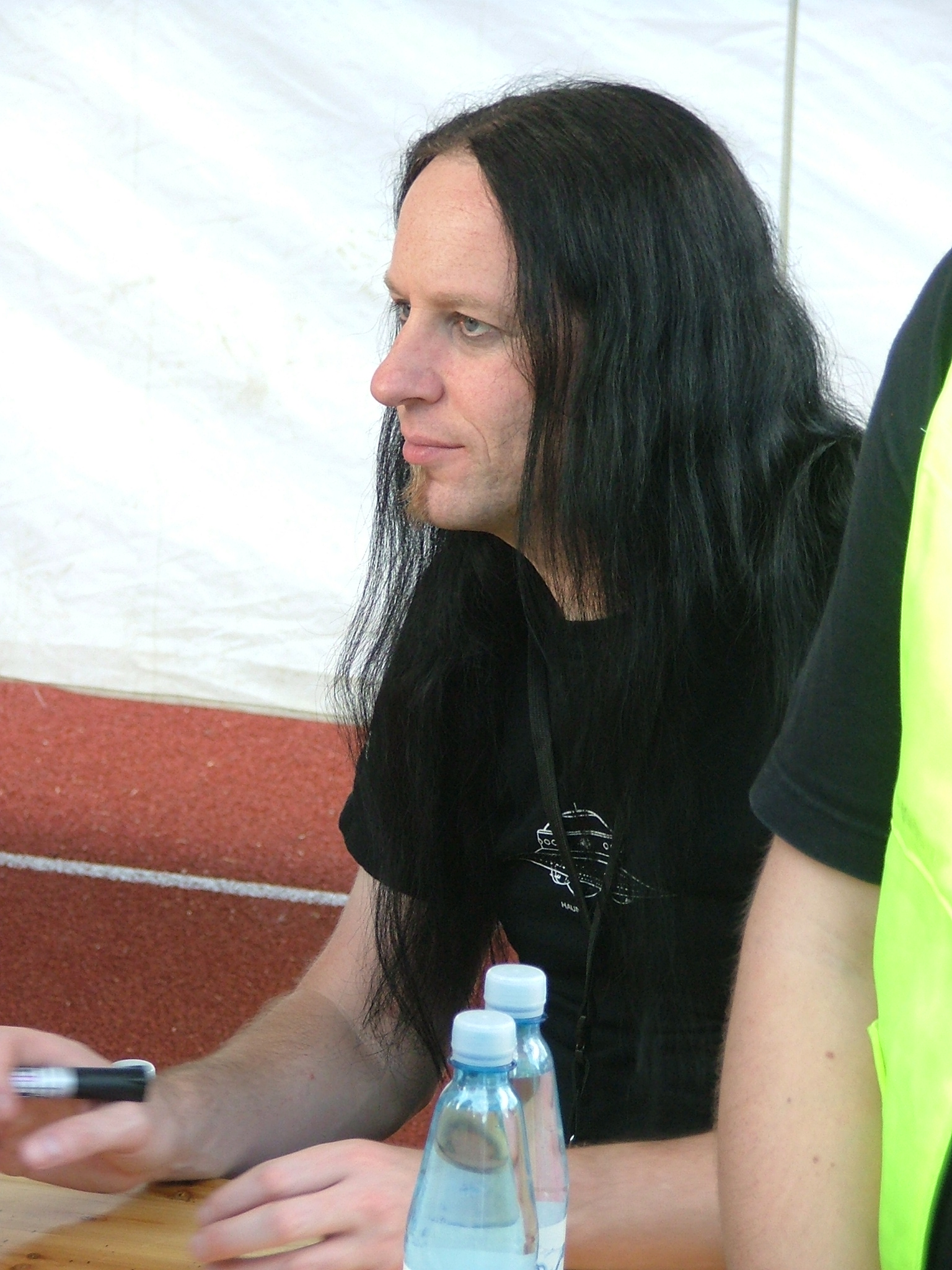
Pybus at Kuopio Rockcock 2008

In 1991, Pybus played guitar in a Misfits cover band called The Hatebreeders. He made a guest appearance on the song "Summernite Stalker" for German horror punk band The Spook, released in August 2007. In October 2008, he performed live for two shows with German band Samsas Traum and toured with them in November 2009. He played bass on the track "Hell is the Face of Love" for Autoclav1.1 in 2008. Pybus contributed to the Roadrunner United project, playing bass on the track "Enemy of the State". He played bass on Sarah Jezebel Deva's debut album A Sign of Sublime in 2010.

Pybus played bass on one track for My Black Omen, a multinational death metal project featuring Kam Lee (Mantas, Massacre) on vocals, Ross Feratu (The Spook, Gorthaur's Wrath, Ramonstars) on guitar and Brian Forman (Unburied) on drums. They released one cover version of the Massacre song "Chamber of Ages" in May 2011.

Pybus left Cradle of Filth in spring 2012. He played bass with American band Prong for their Beg to Differ European tour and the following U.S. tour in the summer of 2012.

== Discography ==
=== Dreambreed ===
- Sometime (1995)
- Misery Sessions (2008)

=== Anathema ===
- Judgement (1999)
- A Fine Day to Exit (2001)

=== Cradle of Filth ===
- Damnation and a Day (2003)
- Nymphetamine (2004)
- Thornography (2006)
- Godspeed on the Devil's Thunder (2008)
- Darkly, Darkly, Venus Aversa (2010)

=== Angtoria ===
- God Has a Plan for Us All (2006)

=== Sarah Jezebel Deva ===
- A Sign of Sublime (2010)
