= Total Fucking Darkness =

- 2014 reissue cover art

Demo album by Cradle of Filth
- Released: 2 November 1992
- Recorded: 1992
- Studios: Springvale Studios, Ipswich; Portacabin Studios, Westerfield, Suffolk
- Genre: Extreme metal
- Length: 23:54; 57:32 (remastered)
- Labels: Self-released; Mordgrimm (remastered)
- Producers: Dani Filth; Paul Ryan; Frater Nihil

Cradle of Filth chronology
Orgiastic Pleasures Foul (1992)	Total Fucking Darkness (1992)	The Principle of Evil Made Flesh (1994)

Professional ratings
Review scores
Source	Rating
AllMusic	3/5 stars

Total Fucking Darkness is the third demo by English extreme metal band Cradle of Filth, recorded in 1992 and released commercially in remastered form in 2014. The remastered release includes "Spattered in Faeces", the only surviving track from the band's abandoned first album Goetia, along with four tracks recorded at a rehearsal session in October 1992.

== Track listing ==
Original version
No.	Title	Length
1.	"The Black Goddess Rises"	6:26
2.	"Unbridled at Dusk"	7:13
3.	"The Raping of Faith"	5:44
4.	"As Deep as Any Burial"	5:44
5.	"Fraternally Yours, 666 (Outro)"	0:27
Total length:		23:54

Remastered version
No.	Title	Length
1.	"Spattered in Faeces"	5:46
2.	"The Black Goddess Rises"	6:46
3.	"As Deep as Any Burial"	4:25
4.	"Unbridled at Dusk"	7:59
5.	"The Raping of Faith"	6:25
6.	"Fraternally Yours, 666 (Outro)"	1:22
7.	"Devil Mayfair (Advocatus Diaboli)"	5:07
8.	"The Black Goddess Rises"	6:23
9.	"The Raping of Faith"	5:55
10.	"Unbridled at Dusk"	7:24
Total length:		57:32

- Track 1 recorded at Springvale Studios in 1992.
- Tracks 2–6 recorded and mixed in three days at Portacabin Studios, Westerfield, Suffolk on 4 tracks.
- Tracks 7–10 recorded during rehearsal, Springvale Studios, Samhain 1992.

== Personnel ==
Cradle of Filth

- Dani Filth – vocals
- Paul Allender – lead guitar
- Paul Ryan – rhythm guitar
- Benjamin Ryan – keyboards
- Robin Graves – bass
- Darren Gardner – drums

Production

- Dani Filth – production, lyrics, artwork
- Paul Ryan – production, assistant engineering
- Jim Partridge – engineering
- Alan Bint – recording, mixing on "Spattered in Faeces"
- Mark Bint – recording, mixing on "Spattered in Faeces"
- Frater Nihil – producer, layout, design
- Tim Turan – remastering
- Daniel P. Carter – artwork
