= Midnight in the Labyrinth =

Compilation album by Cradle of Filth
- Released: 21 April 2012
- Recorded: 2010–2011
- Labels: Peaceville; Nuclear Blast
- Producers: Kit Woolven; Cradle of Filth

Cradle of Filth chronology
Evermore Darkly (2011)	Midnight in the Labyrinth (2012)	The Manticore and Other Horrors (2012)

Professional ratings
Review scores
Source	Rating
Sputnikmusic	1.5/5 stars

Midnight in the Labyrinth is an orchestral compilation album by English extreme metal band Cradle of Filth (although "orchestrations" are credited to keyboard player Mark Newby-Robson and no orchestra or string-section is listed in the album's personnel). The re-recorded songs selected are from the band's first four releases. The title comes from the lyrics of "Mistress from the Sucking Pit", a bonus track on some editions of Darkly, Darkly, Venus Aversa.

The album was released to coincide with Record Store Day on 21 April in participating countries. It was released worldwide on 4 May. Disc One features narration by Dani Filth, plus additional vocals from Sarah Jezebel Deva. Disc Two contains the same recordings minus the vocals. The first disc also includes "Goetia (Invoking the Unclean)", a thirteen-minute "aural séance", recycling the titles of Cradle's abandoned and wiped first album, and first demo.

A demo of the orchestral version of "Summer Dying Fast" appeared as a teaser on the EP Evermore Darkly, and the narrated version of "A Gothic Romance (Red Roses for the Devil's Whore)" was released online, preceding the album on 4 April.

== Production and recording ==
According to vocalist Dani Filth, the album would "reinvent" tracks from the band's first four albums and include "full soundtrack-quality stuff... with choirs, strings and some narration". Filth wrote in an online update:

"All songs will be fully orchestrated akin to a horror movie soundtrack (think Danny Elfman, John Williams, Christopher Young, etc.) and [the record is] composed solely of tracks from our first four releases – 1994's The Principle of Evil Made Flesh; the 1996 EP V Empire; 1996's Dusk... and Her Embrace and 1998's Cruelty and the Beast – [with] "Funeral in Carpathia" being my favorite conversion thus far."

Guitarist Paul Allender stated in an interview:

"One thing I want to do the next time we gig, is play some of these old songs live but have the whole new orchestrations on backing track. Martin [Skaroupka] plays to a click track anyhow, and we've really got clicks set up for everything... Everyone seems to have decided they want to go with it."

Sarah Jezebel Deva announced via her Facebook page that she would be re-joining Cradle of Filth for this release:

"In 2008, I parted ways with Cradle of Filth to pursue a life in Australia... and to go it alone as a solo musician. I know a lot of fans were disappointed with the departure and, until now, whenever a fan asks [if I'll ever work with Cradle of Filth again], the answer has been no! Well, last week, [Dani] Filth sent me an email, and after many chats I have decided to take him up on his offer to participate on the new orchestral album Midnight in the Labyrinth. I hope this will make some of you happy..."

== Track listing ==
Disc One: Narrated
No.	Title	Original release	Length
1.	"A Gothic Romance (Red Roses for the Devil's Whore)"	Dusk... and Her Embrace	8:39
2.	"The Forest Whispers My Name"	The Principle of Evil Made Flesh	5:42
3.	"The Twisted Nails of Faith"	Cruelty and the Beast	7:08
4.	"The Rape and Ruin of Angels (Hosannas in Extremis)"	V Empire	8:20
5.	"Funeral in Carpathia"	Dusk... and Her Embrace	8:52
6.	"Summer Dying Fast"	The Principle of Evil Made Flesh	5:21
7.	"Thirteen Autumns and a Widow"	Cruelty and the Beast	7:15
8.	"Dusk and Her Embrace"	Dusk... and Her Embrace	6:32
9.	"Cruelty Brought Thee Orchids"	Cruelty and the Beast	7:47
10.	"Goetia (Invoking the Unclean)"	Midnight in the Labyrinth	13:06

Disc Two: Orchestral
No.	Title	Original release	Length
1.	"The Rape and Ruin of Angels (Hosannas in Extremis)"	V Empire	8:16
2.	"Dusk and Her Embrace"	Dusk... and Her Embrace	6:29
3.	"Summer Dying Fast"	The Principle of Evil Made Flesh	5:21
4.	"The Twisted Nails of Faith"	Cruelty and the Beast	7:06
5.	"Funeral in Carpathia"	Dusk... and Her Embrace	8:38
6.	"The Forest Whispers My Name"	The Principle of Evil Made Flesh	5:33
7.	"Cruelty Brought Thee Orchids"	Cruelty and the Beast	7:25
8.	"A Gothic Romance (Red Roses for the Devil's Whore)"	Dusk... and Her Embrace	8:36
9.	"Thirteen Autumns and a Widow"	Cruelty and the Beast	7:13

== Personnel ==
- Mark Newby-Robson – orchestration
- Dani Filth – male narration
- Sarah Jezebel Deva – female narration, additional vocals
- Kit Woolven – mixer
