= Sarah Jezebel Deva =

British singer

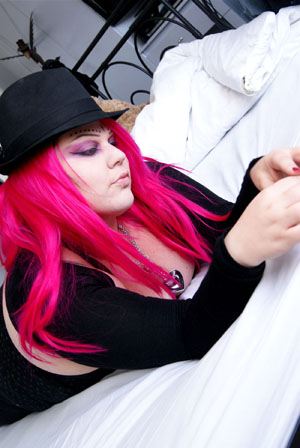
- Sarah Jezebel Deva at Kuopio Rockcock 2008

Background information
- Born: Sarah Jane Ferridge; 25 February 1977 (age 49); Forest Gate, London, England
- Genres: Classical music; symphonic metal; gothic metal; black metal; punk rock
- Occupation: Singer
- Years active: 1988-present

Sarah Jezebel Deva, the stage name of Sarah Jane Ferridge (born 25 February 1977), is an English heavy metal singer. She was the female soprano vocalist for Cradle of Filth for 14 years and the frontwoman of the band Angtoria for 10 years. In 2009, Deva started her self-titled solo project, releasing two studio albums and one EP from 2010 to 2012, and in 2020 announced she would be working with former Angtoria bandmate Chris Rehn on a new project entitled Torn Between Two Worlds.

== Early life ==
Deva was raised in East Ham, London and has two half sisters and three half brothers. She had a troubled and turbulent childhood, leaving home when she was nine years old. Her godmother influenced her life greatly, getting her on the path to music.

== Career ==
Deva's career started at the age of 11 at the Queen's Theatre, Hornchurch, Essex. A cover of Ella Fitzgerald's "Summertime" was her first performance in a live band and totally unrehearsed; she performed one more time there at the age of 13. Deva went on to write her own lyrics and later recorded a demo on her friend's 8-track console. Her first band was called Mad Dog, a punk group in which she was co-vocalist. She only did one show with the band, in Tunbridge Wells, Kent, supporting the punk band 999. Paul Allender and Dani Filth, founders of extreme metal band Cradle of Filth, would later meet Deva through mutual friends.

After leaving Cradle of Filth in 2009, Deva started her self-titled solo project with Ken Newman and signed a deal with a small British record company. A Sign of Sublime, the debut album, was released on 15 February 2010. A European and UK tour followed inclusive of a performance at Femme Metal Festival.

After various issues with the label, Deva left the record company and joined forces with Dan Abela, a musician and producer. Together, they co-wrote The Corruption of Mercy after signing a three-album record deal with Listenable Records in March 2011. The album was released on 27 June 2011.

In December of 2020 Deva announced via her Facebook page that she and former Angtoria bandmate Chris Rehn would be releasing new music under the name Torn Between Two Worlds. The duo's first single "The Beauty of Deception" was released on 31 January 2021, followed by the singles All Exes on me on 2 May 2021, Transparent on 14 January 2022, The Woman That Never Was and the Adele Cover Hello both on 2 June 2022, until As If We Never Existed” an EP on 03 June 2022 was published.

After the release of As If We Never Existed in 2022, Deva resumed live activities with several projects. In December 2024 she returned to the stage with Norwegian band The Kovenant at the Eindhoven Metal Meeting festival in Eindhoven, the Netherlands, in the group's first live appearance in more than a decade, performing alongside Nagash, Steinar Sverd Johnsen, Astennu and Hellhammer. In March 2025 the band announced further festival appearances and a run of Latin American dates in Mexico, Chile, Argentina and Colombia later that year.

In early 2025 Deva appeared as a guest vocalist on A Poison to the Firmament, a two-track EP by Heljarmadr, the solo project of Dark Funeral frontman Andreas "Heljarmadr" Vingbäck, contributing vocals to both tracks.

Later the same year she was featured on a new vocal version of "Minner", taken from Saga of the North, the cinematic solo album by Emperor drummer Trym Torson released under the name Þrymr.

== Discography ==
Solo career

- A Sign of Sublime (2010)
- The Corruption of Mercy (2011)
- Malediction (EP) (2012)

Mad Dog

- Howling at the Moon (1993)

With Cradle of Filth

- V Empire or Dark Faerytales in Phallustein (1996)
- Dusk... and Her Embrace (1996)
- Cruelty and the Beast (1998)
- From the Cradle to Enslave (1999)
- Midian (2000)
- Bitter Suites to Succubi (2001)
- Heavy, Left-Handed and Candid (2001)
- Lovecraft & Witch Hearts (2002)
- Live Bait for the Dead (2002)
- Damnation and a Day (2003)
- Nymphetamine (2004)
- Peace Through Superior Firepower (2005)
- Thornography (2006)
- Godspeed on the Devil's Thunder (2008)
- Midnight in the Labyrinth (2012)

With Creation's Tears

- Methods to End It All (2010)

With The Kovenant

- Nexus Polaris (1998)

With Tulus

- Mysterion (1997)

With Therion

- Vovin (1998)
- Crowning of Atlantis (1999)
- Live in Midgård (2002)
- Celebrators of Becoming (2006)

With Graveworm

- Underneath the Crescent Moon (1998)

With Mortiis

- The Stargate (1998)
- The Smell of Rain (2001)

With Mystic Circle

- Infernal Satanic Verses (1999)

With The Gathering

- Black Light District (2002)

With Mendeed

- From Shadows Came Darkness (2004)

Angtoria

- God Has a Plan for Us All (2006)

Trigger the Bloodshed

- Purgation (2008)

Hecate Enthroned

- Virulent Rapture (2013)
- Embrace of the Godless Aeon (2019)

Torn Between Two Worlds

- The Beauty of Deception (Single) (2021)
- All Eyes On Me (Single) (2021)
- As If We Never Existed (EP) (2022)
- Hello (Single) (2022)
- The Beauty of Deception (Single) (2022)
- Transparent (Single) (2022)

Various artists

- Emerald / A Tribute to the Wild One (Thin Lizzy tribute) (2003) ("Southbound" with Therion)
- The Lotus Eaters (Dead Can Dance tribute) (2004) ("The Wind That Shakes the Barley")
