= The Corruption of Mercy =

Studio album by Sarah Jezebel Deva
- Released: 27 June 2011
- Recorded: 2011
- Genre: Symphonic metal, gothic metal, extreme metal
- Length: 43:30; 49:57 (US version)
- Label: Listenable Records

Sarah Jezebel Deva chronology
A Sign of Sublime (2010)	The Corruption of Mercy (2011)

Professional ratings
Review scores
Source	Rating
Lords of Metal	(9.1/10)

The Corruption of Mercy is the second album by English metal vocalist Sarah Jezebel Deva. Originally planned for release on 20 June 2011, it was delayed till 27 June 2011, due to artwork issues. The album features a cover track originally by Irish band The Cranberries. On the American and Canadian releases, the cover song is "Frozen" by Madonna.

== Track listing ==
No.	Title	Length
1.	"No Paragon of Virtue"	4:34
2.	"The World Won't Hold Your Hand"	5:14
3.	"A Matter of Convenience"	4:25
4.	"Silence Please"	5:28
5.	"Zombie" (The Cranberries cover)	5:23
6.	"Pretty with Effects"	2:57
7.	"What Lays Before You" (interlude/instrumental)	1:36
8.	"Sirens"	3:22
9.	"The Eyes That Lie"	4:43
10.	"The Corruption of Mercy"	5:48
11.	"Frozen" (Madonna cover, bonus track on the American/Canadian release)	6:27
Total length:		43:30
