= Thornography =

Studio album by Cradle of Filth
- Released: 17 October 2006
- Recorded: 2006 at The Chapel Studios, South Thoresby, Lincolnshire, England; Millbrook Sound Studios, Millbrook, New York, United States; Sidelake Studios, Sundsvall, Sweden (track 1)
- Genre: Extreme metal
- Length: 64:44
- Label: Roadrunner
- Producer: Rob Caggiano

Cradle of Filth chronology
Nymphetamine (2004)	Thornography (2006)	Godspeed on the Devil's Thunder (2008)

Singles from Thornography
- 1. "Temptation" Released: 2006; 2. "Dirge Inferno" Released: 2006; 3. "Tonight in Flames" Released: 2007; 4. "The Foetus of a New Day Kicking" Released: 2007

Thornography is the seventh studio album by the English extreme metal band Cradle of Filth. It was released on 17 October 2006, by record label Roadrunner. It was produced by former Anthrax guitarist Rob Caggiano, engineered by Dan Turner and mixed by Andy Sneap, and once again features narration by Doug Bradley (as with Midian and Nymphetamine). It is Cradle of Filth's second album as a five-piece, as keyboardist Martin Powell left the band in 2005. This would also be the band's final album to feature drummer Adrian Erlandsson, and the only full-length to feature guitarist Charles Hedger.

== Content ==
=== Album title ===
Dani Filth explained the album's title in 2006:

This title represents mankind's obsession with sin and self. The thorn combines images of that which troubled Christ, the Crown of Thorns, thus intimating man's seeming desire to hurt God and also of the protecting thorn and the need to enclose a secret place or the soul from attack. An addiction to self-punishment or something equally poisonous. A mania. Twisted desires. Barbed dreams. A fetish. An obsession with cruelty. Savage nature. Paganism over Christianity. The title can also represent a sexual attraction to religious iconography as in the case of the "possessed" Loudun nuns. I like the title because to me it invokes images of a darker, sexier pre-Raphaelite scene wherein Sleeping Beauty's castle is won and she is awoken by a poisonous kiss. A darker, more adult fairytale.

=== Album cover ===
In news posted on the official Cradle of Filth website in mid-May 2006, it was revealed that the planned artwork for Thornography had been vetoed by Roadrunner Records. A replacement was soon forthcoming, although numerous CD booklets had already been printed with the original image. Filth stated in an interview with Metal Hammer that the controversy was over the nakedness of the female figure's legs on the original cover: "When we put the original next to the new version, it was so slightly changed... The nymph's skirt was a little longer. It was like a game of spot the difference". Charles Hedger told Gothtronic.com that the new cover "is practically the same... A lot of Americans are really religious and Roadrunner were basically saying that Wal-Mart was not going to take Cradle albums with that on the cover. But Wal-Mart never takes Cradle albums anyhow, so it doesn't make any difference."

=== Musical style ===
Paul Allender told Terrorizer magazine:

There are quite a few guitar solos on this album. To be honest, I've never really classed myself as a lead player as such, but this is the first time I've sat down and seriously practiced lead work. I've been so involved in actually writing new material and coming up with song structures that I haven't had time to practice all the frilly things that go on top of it. Up 'till now, there hasn't really been much room for guitar solos as such. The riffs we write, they're not riffs that are meant to be soloed on top of. They're melodic within themselves. But I'm a great believer that less is definitely more. I love listening to all the shreddy, widdly stuff, but I have no interest in playing it. This new album is quite guitar-orientated. The last album was, but this is definitely more melodic. Dare I say it, there are quite a lot of typical Maiden-esque harmonies in there.

== Recording ==
Three cover versions were recorded during the album's sessions, namely Samhain's "Halloween II", Shakespears Sister's "Stay", and Heaven 17's "Temptation". "Halloween II" (renamed "HW2") was released on the Underworld: Evolution soundtrack. It is included as a bonus track on the Japanese release of the album. "Temptation" is part of Thornography's finalised track listing, and features vocals by Harry. Harry also stars in the promo video for the track, which was released a week before the album as a digital single. "Stay" surfaced in early 2008 on the Harder, Darker, Faster re-release (see below). A press release by Liv Kristine announced that "Stay" would be Kristine's second guest vocal spot with the band (following "Nymphetamine"). Paul Allender later confirmed however that the duet never actually took place, although versions were recorded with both Harry and Sarah Jezebel Deva. The latter is the version included on the re-release.

Early reports during the album's production process mentioned a track called "The Flora of Nightfall, The Fauna of War". It is unknown which track this was the working title for, although the words appear as a lyric in "Cemetery and Sundown".

== Release ==
Thornography was released on 17 October 2006. It debuted at number 66 on the Billboard Top 200 chart, selling nearly 13,000 copies. It reached number 46 in the UK Albums Chart.

=== Harder, Darker, Faster: Thornography Deluxe ===
Harder, Darker, Faster: Thornography Deluxe was released on 4 February 2008. This version is a CD-DVD package, with the original album in standard stereo format on CD and DVD and the following additional bonus tracks on the DVD only: "Murder in the Thirst", "The Snake-Eyed and the Venomous", "Halloween II" (a cover of the song by Samhain which had previously appeared on the soundtrack to the film Underworld: Evolution), "Courting Baphomet", "Stay" (a cover of the song by Shakespears Sister) and "Devil to the Metal". Original plans to include "Mater Lachrymarum", a song from the soundtrack to the 2007 Dario Argento film The Mother of Tears that Dani contributed to, were scrapped due to rights issues.

== Critical reception ==
Professional ratings
Review scores
Source	Rating
About.com	3.5/5 stars
AllMusic	3.5/5 stars
Collector's Guide to Heavy Metal	6/10
Exclaim!	favourable
Kerrang!	unfavourable
Metal Hammer	favourable
PopMatters	7/10 stars
Terrorizer	favourable

Critical response to Thornography has been generally favourable. Metal Hammer called it "undoubtedly their heaviest and most guitar-dominated record in many years", though commenting that the band's cover of Heaven 17's "Temptation" is "ridiculous" and "best avoided". Terrorizer called the album "sharp, slick, elegant, focused, catchy, accessible heavy gothic metal, with the dark romantic schtick still present, but reined in and more explicitly parodic". AllMusic commented on the album's comparatively more mainstream style: "...by the sound of Thornography, CoF are aiming at playing an arena near you sometime in the near future." PopMatters wrote: "Thornography, all things taken into consideration, is one of most solid additions in Cradle of Filth's history".

Kerrang!, on the other hand, commented: "The black magic for which they're usually so dependable is in short supply... If there was a word to sum Thornography up, it would be 'incomplete'..."

== Track listing ==
All lyrics are written by Dani Filth; all music is composed by Cradle of Filth (Filth, Paul Allender, Charles Hedger, Dave Pybus, Adrian Erlandsson), except where indicated.

No.	Title	Writer(s)	Length
1.	"Under Pregnant Skies She Comes Alive Like Miss Leviathan" (instrumental)		1:40
2.	"Dirge Inferno"		4:53
3.	"Tonight in Flames"		5:55
4.	"Libertina Grimm"		5:51
5.	"The Byronic Man" (featuring Ville Valo of HIM)		5:03
6.	"I Am the Thorn"		7:06
7.	"Cemetery and Sundown"		5:37
8.	"Lovesick for Mina"		7:00
9.	"The Foetus of a New Day Kicking"		3:43
10.	"Rise of the Pentagram" (instrumental)	Allender	7:02
11.	"Under Huntress Moon"		6:58
12.	"Temptation" (Heaven 17 cover, featuring Dirty Harry)	Glenn Gregory, Ian Craig Marsh, Martyn Ware	3:47

Japanese edition bonus track
No.	Title	Writer(s)	Length
13.	"Halloween II" (Samhain cover)	Glenn Danzig	3:36

Harder, Darker, Faster: Thornography Deluxe DVD one bonus tracks
No.	Title	Writer(s)	Length
13.	"Murder in the Thirst (Instrumental)"		1:17
14.	"The Snake-Eyed and the Venomous"		5:47
15.	"Halloween II" (Samhain cover)	Danzig	3:36
16.	"Courting Baphomet"		5:17
17.	"Stay" (Shakespears Sister cover)	Siobhan Fahey, Marcella Detroit, Jean Guiot	4:55
18.	"Devil to the Metal"		6:18
19.	"Temptation" (video)		3:47
20.	"Tonight in Flames" (video)		4:19
21.	"The Foetus of a New Day Kicking" (video)		3:47
22.	"Making of "The Foetus of a New Day Kicking"" (video)		14:59

== Personnel ==
=== Cradle of Filth ===
- Dani Filth – lead vocals
- Paul Allender – guitars
- Charles Hedger – guitars
- Dave Pybus – bass, backing vocals on "Halloween II"
- Adrian Erlandsson – drums
- Sarah Jezebel Deva – backing vocals, co-lead vocals on "Stay"

=== Session/guest musicians ===
- Doug Bradley – narration on tracks 3 and 10
- Ville Valo – vocals on "The Byronic Man"
- Dirty Harry – vocals on "Temptation"
- Martin Walkyier – backing vocals on "The Snake-Eyed and the Venomous"
- Mark Newby-Robson – keyboards on original edition, "Courting Baphomet" and "Devil to the Metal"
- Christopher Jon – additional keyboards on original edition and "The Snake-Eyed and the Venomous"
- Chris Rehn – producer, composition and performance of track 1, orchestral arrangements on "Stay", backing vocals on track 1
- Tommy Rehn – producer and additional arrangements of track 1, orchestral arrangements on "Stay", backing vocals on track 1
- Veronica Rehn – vocals on track 1
- Tony Konberg, Hanna Tornqvist, Linnea Kibe – backing vocals on track 1
- Rob Caggiano – drums on "Stay", backing vocals on "Halloween II"
- Aric Prentice, Keith Halliday, Charlie Jenkins, Moira Johnson, Ruth Nixon, Chris Mitchell, Rachel Line, William Harrison, Sophie Allen, Laela Adamson – choir vocals
- Laura Reid – cello

=== Production ===
- Rob Caggiano – producer
- Dan Turner – engineer
- Andy Sneap – mixing and mastering at Backstage Studios, Derbyshire
- Daniel Presley – arrangement of orchestral passages, composition and arrangement of "Murder in the Thirst"

== Charts ==
Year	Chart	Position
2006	Finnish Albums Chart	16
2006	Austrian Albums Chart	20
2006	German Albums Chart	27
2006	New Zealand Albums Chart	28
2006	Australian Albums Chart	35
2006	Swedish Albums Chart	37
2006	UK Albums Chart	46
2006	GfK Dutch Chart	48
2006	French Albums Chart	48
2006	Canadian Albums Chart	50
2006	Ultratop Belgian Chart (Flanders)	58
2006	Billboard 200 (USA)	66
2006	Swiss Albums Chart	71
2006	Oricon Japanese Albums Chart	104
