= V Empire or Dark Faerytales in Phallustein =

EP by Cradle of Filth
- Released: 22 April 1996
- Recorded: Winter 1995–1996
- Studio: Academy Music Studio (Dewsbury)
- Genre: Extreme metal
- Length: 36:24
- Label: Cacophonous
- Producer: Robert "Mags" Magoolagan

Cradle of Filth chronology
The Principle of Evil Made Flesh (1994)	V Empire or Dark Faerytales in Phallustein (1996)	Dusk... and Her Embrace (1996)

Professional ratings
Review scores
Source	Rating
AllMusic	favourable
Chronicles of Chaos	8/10
Collector's Guide to Heavy Metal	8/10
Encyclopedia of Popular Music	3/5 stars

V Empire or Dark Faerytales in Phallustein is the first EP by English extreme metal band Cradle of Filth, and the first release following their 1994 debut studio album The Principle of Evil Made Flesh. It was released on 22 April 1996, and was the band's final release for Cacophonous Records.

== Recording ==
V Empire was hastily written and recorded for Cacophonous Records as a contractual obligation before the band jumped ship to Music for Nations. As such, it is the first of two albums released in 1996, the other being Dusk... and Her Embrace. Half of the band was replaced for this recording, with Stuart Anstis replacing guitarists Paul Allender and Paul Ryan and Damien Gregori replacing keyboardist Benjamin Ryan. All the guitars on V Empire were performed by Anstis. The name "Jared Demeter" listed as a second guitarist in the liner notes included in the booklet of the EP is just a made-up name to give the impression that there were two guitarists on the EP. V Empire is the first recording to feature backing vocalist Sarah Jezebel Deva.

The track "Queen of Winter, Throned" is something of a sequel to the song "A Dream of Wolves in the Snow" from The Principle of Evil Made Flesh.

== Content ==
V Empire is a step up in production from the band's debut and introduces the fast, highly technical instrumentation characteristic of the next few releases. It includes a re-recorded version of "The Forest Whispers My Name" from The Principle of Evil Made Flesh.

=== Title ===
The Gospel of Filth, a definitive history of the band and its influences, written by Gavin Baddeley and Dani Filth and published in 2010, refers to this record throughout as V Empire. Due to the typographic sizing and spacing of the record's cover art, however, it has been widely read as Vempire in the years since its release. References like AllMusic and Discogs continue to retain the latter spelling, while some recent interviews appear to indicate that the band also pronounce it "Vempire" in conversation.

== Track listing ==
All lyrics are written by Dani Filth; all music is composed by Cradle of Filth (Filth, Stuart Anstis, Robin Graves, Damien Gregori, Nick Barker).

No.	Title	Length
1.	"Ebony Dressed for Sunset"	2:49
2.	"The Forest Whispers My Name"	4:41
3.	"Queen of Winter, Throned"	10:27
4.	"Nocturnal Supremacy"	5:53
5.	"She Mourns a Lengthening Shadow" (instrumental)	3:42
6.	"The Rape and Ruin of Angels (Hosannas in Extremis)"	8:52
Total length:		36:24

Notes:

"The Forest Whispers My Name" was re-recorded for this disc and is different from its original version on The Principle of Evil Made Flesh. "Queen Of Winter, Throned" repeats some elements from "A Dream of Wolves in the Snow".

== Personnel ==
All information from the EP's booklet.

Cradle of Filth

- Dani Filth – lead vocals, lyrics
- Stuart Anstis – guitars
- Robin Graves – bass
- Damien Gregori – keyboards
- Nick Barker – drums

Additional musicians

- Sarah Jezebel Deva – backing vocals
- Danielle Cneajna Cottington – backing vocals
- Rachel – backing vocals

Production

- Chris Bell – artwork
- Nigel Wingrove – art direction
- Frater Nihil – photography
- Mags – producer
- Keith Appleton – engineering
- Nilesh – mastering
- Eileen – succubi model
- Vida – succubi model
- Scarlet – succubi model
- Luna – succubi model
- Gabrielle – succubi model
