= Live Bait for the Dead =

Live album by Cradle of Filth
- Released: 19 August 2002
- Recorded: 14 April 2001
- Venue: Rock City in Nottingham (disc one)
- Genre: Extreme metal
- Length: 74:54
- Label: Abracadaver
- Producer: Cradle of Filth

Cradle of Filth chronology
Lovecraft & Witch Hearts (2002)	Live Bait for the Dead (2002)	Damnation and a Day (2003)

Alternative cover
- Eleven Burial Masses release

Live Bait for the Dead is a live album by British metal band Cradle of Filth, recorded at Nottingham Rock City on 14 April 2001 and released on 19 August 2002. The album was released and (uniquely, so far) distributed on the band's own Abracadaver label. The same gig is included on the DVD Heavy, Left-Handed and Candid. Following the same format as Lovecraft & Witch Hearts, the main album is supplemented by a second disc of rare tracks and remixes. This would be bassist Robin Eaglestone's final recorded appearance.

== Eleven Burial Masses ==
A 2007 release by Peaceville Records combines the first disc of Live Bait for the Dead with the Heavy, Left-Handed and Candid DVD (minus the bonus features). The "eleven" of the title does not take into account the instrumentals "The Ceremony Opens" and "Creatures That Kissed in Cold Mirrors".

In October 2011 it was awarded a gold certification from the Independent Music Companies Association which indicated sales of at least 75,000 copies throughout Europe.

== Critical reception ==
Professional ratings
Review scores
Source	Rating
AllMusic	2/5 stars
Encyclopedia of Popular Music	2/5 stars

AllMusic wrote, "the performance and set list are impeccable, but it's ultimately redundant, and strictly for fans only."

== Track listing ==
Disc one
No.	Title	Length
1.	"Intro – The Ceremony Opens"	2:45
2.	"Lord Abortion"	6:33
3.	"Ebony Dressed for Sunset"	2:55
4.	"The Forest Whispers My Name"	4:55
5.	"Cthulhu Dawn"	4:31
6.	"Dusk and Her Embrace"	6:24
7.	"The Principle of Evil Made Flesh"	5:42
8.	"Cruelty Brought Thee Orchids"	7:54
9.	"Her Ghost in the Fog"	7:33
10.	"Summer Dying Fast"	5:43
11.	"Interlude – Creatures That Kissed in Cold Mirrors"	3:56
12.	"From the Cradle to Enslave"	5:59
13.	"Queen of Winter, Throned"	10:04

Disc two
No.	Title	Length
1.	"Born in a Burial Gown (The Polished Coffin Mix)"	5:18
2.	"No Time to Cry (Sisters of No Mercy Mix)"	4:20
3.	"Funeral in Carpathia (Soundcheck Recording)"	8:22
4.	"Deleted Scenes of a Snuff Princess"	5:37
5.	"Scorched Earth Erotica (Original Demo(n) Version)"	4:57
6.	"Nocturnal Supremacy (Soundcheck Recording)"	6:03
7.	"From the Cradle to Enslave (Under Martian Rule Mix)"	6:05
8.	"The Fire Still Burns" (Twisted Sister cover)	4:08

CD ROM Extras

- Downloadable screensaver
- "No Time to Cry" (promo video)

== Personnel ==
Cradle of Filth

- Dani Filth – lead vocals
- Sarah Jezebel Deva – female vocals
- Paul Allender – guitars
- Gian Pyres – guitars
- Robin Graves – bass
- Martin Powell – keyboards
- Adrian Erlandsson – drums

== Charts ==
Year	Chart	Position
2002	French Albums Chart	134
2002	UK Albums Chart	175
