= A Sign of Sublime =

Studio album by Sarah Jezebel Deva
- Released: 15 February 2010
- Recorded: March–July 2008 at Backstage Studios in Derbyshire, England
- Genre: Gothic metal, symphonic metal
- Length: 38:01 (standard); 42:04 (digipak)
- Label: Rising

Sarah Jezebel Deva chronology
| A Sign of Sublime (2010) | The Corruption of Mercy (2011) |

Professional ratings
Review scores
| Source | Rating |
|---|---|
| Lords of Metal | (7.8/10) |
| Metal Storm | 6.5/10 stars |

A Sign of Sublime is the debut solo album of former Cradle of Filth vocalist Sarah Jezebel Deva. It is the only album to be released by Deva on Rising Records, as a new three-record deal was signed with Listenable Records for the follow-up album.

== Promotion ==
A music video for the title track was released before the album's release. Deva was interviewed in the UK magazine Metal Hammer, announcing her work as a solo artist.

== Track listing ==
| No. | Title | Length |
|---|---|---|
| 1. | "Genesis" (instrumental) | 2:11 |
| 2. | "A Sign of Sublime" | 4:04 |
| 3. | "She Stands Like Stone" | 4:12 |
| 4. | "The Devils Opera" (classical/opera track) | 5:17 |
| 5. | "They Called Her Lady Tyranny" | 4:54 |
| 6. | "The Road to Nowhere" | 5:03 |
| 7. | "Your Woeful Chair" | 6:10 |
| 8. | "A Newborn Failure" | 2:06 |
| 9. | "Daddy's Not Coming Home" | 4:07 |
| 10. | "Bitch" (Meredith Brooks cover; digipak bonus track) | 4:03 |
| Total length: | | 42:04 |
