= Rosie Smith =

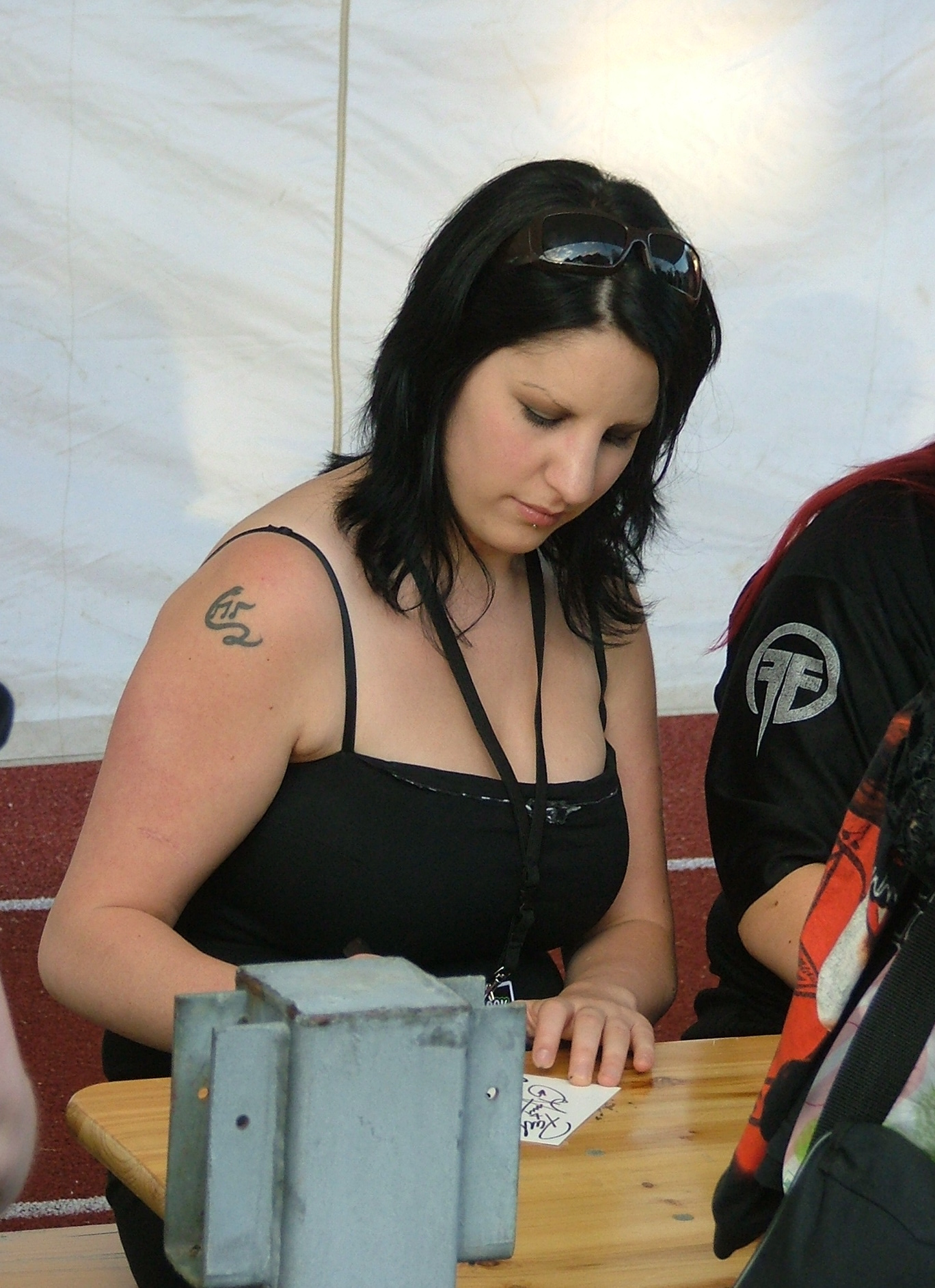
- Rosie Smith at Rockcock - music festival

Background information
- Born: Rosemary Ellen Smith; 20 July 1983 (age 42)
- Origin: London; England
- Genres: Rock; extreme metal; Gothic Jazz
- Occupation: Musician
- Instruments: Keyboards, saxophone, harp
- Years active: 2005–present
- Label: Candlelight

Rosemary Ellen "Rosie" Smith (born 20 July 1983, London) is an English rock and metal musician, best known as a former touring keyboardist for English extreme metal band Cradle of Filth, with whom she remained until 2009.

== Biography ==
Born in London, Smith moved to Dorset at the age of twelve. She earned a music diploma at Weymouth College, where she met and joined her first band, Jacks Back. During this time she also played saxophone in a Tina Turner tribute band. At the age of twenty, she attended the University of Salford, where her next band Sugalo was formed. Soon after that she met Cradle of Filth and was suggested for audition by a mutual acquaintance.

Smith has also embarked on two projects separate to Cradle of Filth, her solo project 'Rosa Damascena' and the duo 'Robert John and Rosie Smith'. Rosa Damascena has seen the release on one EP, 3 Days Before Midnight, which is her own copyrighted genre 'Gazz' (goth jazz). Robert John and Rosie Smith are currently recording their debut album, Broken Branches and both records have been recorded, mixed, mastered and produced by Smith.

Smith currently resides back in Dorset. She now teaches piano, is the CEO of Shooting Gallery Studios, and plays keyboards with Dorset-based ska band The Decatonics.
