= The Principle of Evil Made Flesh =

Studio album by Cradle of Filth
- Released: 24 February 1994
- Recorded: Academy Music Studio, Dewsbury, England, September–November 1993
- Genre: Extreme metal
- Length: 52:34
- Label: Cacophonous
- Producer: Robert "Mags" Magoolagan

Cradle of Filth chronology
The Principle of Evil Made Flesh (1994)	V Empire or Dark Faerytales in Phallustein (1996)

The Principle of Evil Made Flesh is the debut studio album by English extreme metal band Cradle of Filth. It was released on 24 February 1994 through Cacophonous Records, following three demos released between 1991 and 1993. The album's sound is significantly more raw than on subsequent releases, and frontman Dani Filth's vocals differ from his later style and technique. The album is a then-unusual hybrid of gothic metal and black metal. This would be the only album featuring guitarist Paul Ryan and keyboardist Benjamin Ryan. Guitarist Paul Allender also left the band at this point, but returned five years later for Midian.

Some of the tracks were later re-recorded for V Empire (1996), Bitter Suites to Succubi (2001), and Midnight in the Labyrinth (2012).

== Musical style ==
In the book The Gospel of Filth, Gavin Baddeley describes the album and its place within (or alongside) the contemporary black metal scene:

Principle did share several characteristics with the Scandinavian black metal emerging at the time, above and beyond the kindred fascination with all things dark and devilish. Cradle's debut is their rawest recording, chiming with the crude underproduction now demanded by black metal purists (though how much of that rawness was due to inexperience and budgetary limitations is another matter). It's still the only Cradle of Filth recording accepted as "true" black metal by many in the murkier corners of the underground... [but] there were as many things separating Cradle of Filth from the emerging black metal pack as they had in common. Just as important to Cradle's developing identity as the metal bands they grew up with in the 1980s and their contemporaries in the '90s was the dark verse and literature of the 1880s and '90s, produced by the artistic deviants of the day, known as the Decadents... Under the icy influence of the Norwegians, black metal had become a nihilistic, savage world of darkness and suffering, with little space for sensuality... Cradle pioneered a slick gothic image, emphasising the seductive aspects of the dark side...

John Serba of AllMusic described the album's musical style:

Utilizing flowery classical flourishes, tangible melodies, nimble death/thrash riffing, a coherent—albeit crushing—rhythmic battery and the deranged, multifaceted caterwaul of vocalist Dani Davey, The Principle of Evil Made Flesh brought a musical sensibility to the black metal table that was absent in early genre releases by Emperor, Enslaved and Mayhem. Boasting a blatant goth influence—i.e., lengthy keyboard intros, intermittent operatic female vocals, Davey's black 'n' blood take on romantic poetry [...] and slightly tongue-in-cheek vampire and occult imagery—Cradle came across as a lean combination of key influences, including Venom, Iron Maiden, Bathory, Possessed, Celtic Frost and Slayer, all spot-welded to the miscreant clatterings of Norway's finest.

He further commented that "Principle made waves in the early black metal scene, putting Cradle of Filth on the tips of metalheads' tongues, whether in praise of the band's brazen attempts to break the black metal mold or in derision for its 'commercialization' of an underground phenomenon that was proud of its grimy heritage […]."

Speaking to Ryan Bird of Kerrang! in 2008, Dani Filth remembered the following:

First and foremost we just wanted to make a good-sounding record. We were in the same studio that bands like Paradise Lost, Anathema and My Dying Bride had all been in before, and we were aiming for a really moody, dramatic vibe that had become synonymous with the British metal scene, but at the same time we wanted the ferocity of the European scene. It ended up being a very underground record, but we weren't actually trying to do that. We wanted to make a very big sounding record, and I think even to this day it's a record with a very unique flavour. Back then people in the extreme metal hadn't become quite as jaded and as cynical as they seem to have become these days, so it was generally received quite well. It took a little while to worm its way into people's heads, but I think it opened a lot of people's eyes in the process.

== Lyrical content ==
Despite backing vocalist Andrea Meyer styling herself as the band's "Satanic advisor" and Paul Ryan being credited in the sleeve notes for "Satanic war noise", the lyrics make scant mention of Satan or Satanism. Specific references only appear on the intro track "Darkness Our Bride" (the chant "Agios o Satanas"), and indirectly on the track "Of Mist and Midnight Skies" (a line about "Satanic decree"). The lyrics do express anti-religious sentiments in tracks such as "The Forest Whispers My Name" and "A Crescendo of Passion Bleeding".

The album contains many mythological and occult references, encompassing Set, the Valkyrie, Hecate, Baphomet, Artemis, Bastet, Astarte, Ishtar, Khem, Al-Uzza, Eve, Aleister Crowley, Diana and Lilith. The sleeve quotes Hegel, Swinburne and Hitler ("Weltmacht oder Niedergang"). Dani Filth explained the album's overwhelmingly female pantheon in The Gospel of Filth:

The personification of evil as a woman comes down to a really simple equation with me. If you're going to write very intimately about a character, I'd rather be intimate with a woman... I'd rather worship a female entity than a male one. If God's representative on Earth was male, it seems logical to me that the opposite would be female, especially with the traditional symbolic association between femininity and the moon. In a sense, we venerate woman as the author of original sin, and therefore, the reason for man straying from God...

Sixteen years on from Principle, Lilith reappeared as the central character of Cradle of Filth's 2010 concept album Darkly, Darkly, Venus Aversa.

== Cover art ==
The cover is a stock image from Nigel Wingrove's Redemption portfolio.

== Critical reception ==
Professional ratings
Review scores
Source	Rating
AllMusic	3/5 stars
Collector's Guide to Heavy Metal	7/10
Encyclopedia of Popular Music	2/5 stars
Kerrang!	3/5 stars

AllMusic wrote, "Principle, in retrospect, doesn't quite live up to the quality control exhibited on later records, the album leaving plenty of room for the group to grow into its studded S&M gear. Too often, Dani's vocals are reduced to generic death-puking or heavy-handed, Tom Warrior-style monotone narration, and the spiky guitar riffs of the title track and 'A Crescendo of Passion Bleeding' are relatively primitive by CoF standards."

In 2013, Decibel ranked The Principle of Evil Made Flesh at number 31 on its list of the Top 100 Black Metal Albums of All Time.

== Track listing ==
All lyrics are written by Dani Filth; all music is composed by Cradle of Filth (Filth, Paul Allender, Paul Ryan, Robin Graves, Benjamin Ryan and Nick Barker).

No.	Title	Length
1.	"Darkness Our Bride (Jugular Wedding)" (instrumental)	2:00
2.	"The Principle of Evil Made Flesh"	4:34
3.	"The Forest Whispers My Name"	5:06
4.	"Iscariot" (instrumental)	2:33
5.	"The Black Goddess Rises"	6:48
6.	"One Final Graven Kiss" (instrumental)	2:15
7.	"A Crescendo of Passion Bleeding"	5:30
8.	"To Eve the Art of Witchcraft"	5:28
9.	"Of Mist and Midnight Skies"	8:10
10.	"In Secret Love We Drown" (instrumental)	1:29
11.	"A Dream of Wolves in the Snow"	2:10
12.	"Summer Dying Fast"	5:39
13.	"Imperium Tenebrarum" (hidden track)	0:49
Total length:		52:34

== Personnel ==
All information from the album booklet.

Cradle of Filth

- Dani Filth – lead vocals
- Paul Allender – guitars
- Paul Ryan – guitars
- Robin Graves – bass
- Benjamin Ryan – keyboards
- Nick Barker – drums

Additional musicians

- Frater Nihil – vocals and lyrics on "Imperium Tenebrarum"
- Darren White (Anathema) – additional vocals on "A Dream of Wolves in the Snow"
- Soror Proselenos – cello
- Andrea Meyer – female vocals

Production

- Mags – producer, mixing
- Nilesh – mastering
- Chris Bell – photography
- Paul Harries – photography
- Mark – photography
- Nigel Wingrove – art direction
