= Dusk and Her Embrace =

1996 album by Cradle of Filth

Dusk... and Her Embrace

Studio album by Cradle of Filth
- Released: 18 November 1996
- Recorded: September–November 1995
- Studios: DEP International Studios, Birmingham, England
- Genre: Extreme metal
- Length: 53:13
- Label: Music for Nations
- Producers: Kit Woolven; Cradle of Filth

Cradle of Filth chronology
V Empire or Dark Faerytales in Phallustein (1996)	Dusk... and Her Embrace (1996)	Cruelty and the Beast (1998)

Alternate covers
- Variant digipak edition

Alternative cover
- Variant coffin box packaging

Professional ratings
Review scores
Source	Rating
AllMusic	4.5/5 stars
Chronicles of Chaos	8/10
CMJ New Music Monthly	unfavourable
Collector's Guide to Heavy Metal	8/10
Encyclopedia of Popular Music	2/5 stars
Exclaim!	favourable

Dusk... and Her Embrace is the second studio album by English extreme metal band Cradle of Filth. It was released on 18 November 1996 and is their first release on the label Music for Nations.

== Background ==
Much of the material for the album was written while the band were still under Cacophonous Records' contract. Speaking to Ryan Bird of Kerrang! in 2008, Dani Filth remembered:

This was a bit of a weird one. We actually recorded it as our second release, but we then had to take our label to court which meant that most of it was temporarily lost for legal reasons. The next thing I know the band had split into two-halves, and after releasing the V Empire EP my half was able to re-record and finally release the album. In a way it actually worked in our favour, because after nearly two years of legal battles and non-stop hassle I think the troubles of the times actually came through on the recording. We actually worked with Kit Woolven on that one, who most people knew from working with Thin Lizzy, so it had a very lush edge as well as this distinctive, dark vibe. To this day this is the album that a lot of our fans seem to be really drawn to. And it catapulted us into a whole new world.

Filth later told Kerrang! that the tone and content of the record were also partly the result of Cradle's isolation from the European black metal scene:

Being segregated from mainland Europe really divided us [from that scene], and over time we felt more and more alienated from it. The result was that Dusk and Her Embrace was a quintessentially British album. It was just what felt right. I grew up on Hammer Horror... and we were very much also immersed in the history of witchcraft in Suffolk. There's a lot of spiritual mythology and hauntings in that area, and we channelled that into the album, which is why it has that sort of vampiric feel to it.

The album climaxes with a guest speech from Venom's Cronos on the final track, "Haunted Shores".

== Release ==
Dusk and Her Embrace was released in November 1996 by record label Music for Nations. It charted just outside of the UK top 100, at 107.

== Critical reception ==
Critical reception of this album has been generally positive. AllMusic wrote: "Dusk and Her Embrace may be [Cradle of Filth's] finest moment." In 2021, it was elected by Metal Hammer as the 4th best symphonic metal album of all time.

== Track listing ==
All lyrics are written by Dani Filth.

No.	Title	Length
1.	"Humana Inspired to Nightmare" (instrumental)	1:23
2.	"Heaven Torn Asunder"	7:06
3.	"Funeral in Carpathia"	8:24
4.	"A Gothic Romance (Red Roses for the Devil's Whore)"	8:35
5.	"Malice Through the Looking Glass"	5:30
6.	"Dusk and Her Embrace"	6:09
7.	"The Graveyard by Moonlight" (instrumental)	2:28
8.	"Beauty Slept in Sodom"	6:32
9.	"Haunted Shores" (feat. Cronos of Venom)	7:04
Total length:		53:13

Bonus Tracks
No.	Title	Length
10.	"Hell Awaits" (Slayer cover)	5:41
11.	"Carmilla's Masque" (instrumental)	2:54

Leather "digibook" edition bonus track
No.	Title	Length
5.	"Nocturnal Supremacy '96"	5:59

== Personnel ==
All information from the album booklet.

Cradle of Filth

- Dani Filth – lead vocals
- Stuart Anstis – guitars
- Gian Pyres – guitars (credited, but doesn't play on the album), songwriting on "Nocturnal Supremacy '96"
- Robin Graves – bass
- Damien Gregori – keyboards
- Nick Barker – drums
- Sarah Jezebel Deva – backing vocals

Additional musicians

- Cronos – additional vocals on "Haunted Shores"
- Danielle Cneajna Cottington – backing vocals

Production

- Kit Woolven – producer
- Dan Sprigg – engineering
- Mike "Exorcist" Exeter – engineering
- Sato Devinn – effects
- Eileen – cover model
- Nigel Wingrove – art direction
- Simon Marsden – photography
- Chris Bell – photography
- Salvatore – artwork
- Mez – artwork, layout

== Charts ==
Chart (1996)	Peak position
Finnish Albums Chart	24
UK Albums Chart	107

Chart (2026)	Peak position
Belgian Albums (Ultratop Flanders)	46
Belgian Albums (Ultratop Wallonia)	141

== Dusk and Her Embrace: The Original Sin ==
Dusk... and Her Embrace: The Original Sin

Demo album by Cradle of Filth
- Released: 8 July 2016
- Recorded: Spring 1995
- Studios: Zella Studios, Birmingham
- Genre: Extreme metal
- Length: 69:23
- Label: Cacophonous
- Producers: Andy Reilly; Mike Cowling; Zakk Bajjon

Cradle of Filth chronology
Hammer of the Witches (2015)	Dusk... and Her Embrace: The Original Sin (2016)	Cryptoriana – The Seductiveness of Decay (2017)

Dusk... and Her Embrace exists in two versions. It was initially recorded as the band's second album for Cacophonous records following The Principle of Evil Made Flesh. Cradle's relationship with Cacophonous subsequently collapsed, however, with the band accusing the label of contractual and financial mismanagement. Acrimonious legal proceedings took up most of 1995, and the original version of Dusk was shelved and later re-worked and re-recorded as the eventual 1996 Music for Nations release. Writing in The Gospel of Filth in 2009, Dani indicated that these early recordings were merely demos, rather than a finished album:

We reached a deal with Cacophonous whereby they got another recording from us [V Empire], and in return they agreed to cease the dispute we'd become entangled in with them. The material that we'd demoed for Dusk and Her Embrace needed the space and attention of a full album, so we saved it.

Dani Filth revealed plans for a 20th anniversary release of the original 1995 Cacophonous recordings in 2015, and a release date was officially announced in 2016. Filth told Team Rock:

The original recordings of Dusk – which were literally just sat gathering dust on someone's shelf – are actually going to see the light of day. It's going to be a really cool part of Cradle history, and obviously they've never been heard before by anyone.

The title for the new release was Dusk... and Her Embrace: The Original Sin. It was released on CD and digital on 8 July 2016. A vinyl version, limited to 666 copies, followed on 10 October 2016. The liner notes confirm that the lineup for this version was almost the same as for The Principle of Evil Made Flesh, including Paul Allender, Paul Ryan and Benjamin Ryan, but excluding Robin Graves, who was shortly replaced by Jon Kennedy. Allender, the Ryan brothers and Kennedy all left the band before the 1996 version of Dusk... was recorded. Filth and Nick Barker were the only members to appear in both versions.

=== Track listing ===
No.	Title	Length
1.	"Macabre, This Banquet" (instrumental)	1:33
2.	"Nocturnal Supremacy"	6:04
3.	"Heaven Torn Asunder"	6:56
4.	"Dusk and Her Embrace"	6:14
5.	"A Gothic Romance"	8:46
6.	"The Graveyard by Moonlight" (instrumental)	2:02
7.	"Funeral in Carpathia"	8:21
8.	"Beauty Slept in Sodom"	6:36
9.	"The Haunted Shores of Avalon"	7:12
10.	"Carmilla's Masque" (instrumental)	2:59
11.	"A Gothic Romance (Demo Version)"	8:25
12.	"Nocturnal Supremacy (Demo Version)"	6:15
Total length:		69:23

=== Personnel ===
==== Cradle of Filth ====
- Dani Filth – lead vocals
- Paul Allender – guitars
- Paul Ryan – guitars
- Jon Kennedy – bass
- Nick Barker – drums
- Benjamin Ryan – keyboards
- Sarah Jezebel Deva – backing vocals
- Danielle Cneajna Cottington – backing vocals

==== Guest/session musicians ====
- Steve Grimmett – vocals ("Arthurian Wails") on "Haunted Shores"
- Cronos – vocals ("Rabid Captor of Bestial Malevolence") on "Haunted Shores"

==== Production ====
- Andy Reilly, Mike Cowling, Zakk Bajjon – producer, engineer
- Scott Atkins – mastering (2016)
- Drake Mefestta, Frater Nihil, Dani Filth – sleeve art, art direction, design and layout
