= Robin Eaglestone =

British musician

Robin Mark Eaglestone (born 1976) is an English musician.

== Biography ==
He was the bassist for the extreme metal band Cradle of Filth. Also known as Robin Graves, he joined Cradle of Filth in 1992 as 2nd guitarist for the recording of the Invoking the Unclean demo then later changed to bass for the Total Fucking Darkness demo. He was with the band until 2002.

Eaglestone is currently, working on his own project, Imperial Black. He has also previously played with Criminal, Belphegor, Abgott, Grimfist, and December Moon.

During Cradle of Filth's tenure, each member's position in the band is described in a different manner (e.g. Vocals into "Dark Immortal Screams" or "Lycanthroat"). Though everyone else's role was described differently on each successive album, Robin's was always called "Nocturnal Pulse".

== Discography ==
- Cradle of Filth, Total Fucking Darkness demo, 1992
- Cradle of Filth, The Principle of Evil Made Flesh, 1994
- Cradle of Filth, V Empire or Dark Faerytales in Phallustein EP, 1996
- Cradle of Filth, Dusk and Her Embrace, 1996
- Cradle of Filth, Cruelty and the Beast, 1998
- Cradle of Filth, PanDaemonAeon DVD, 1999
- Cradle of Filth, From the Cradle to Enslave EP, 1999
- Cradle of Filth, Midian, 2000
- Cradle of Filth, Bitter Suites to Succubi, 2001
- Cradle of Filth, Live Bait for the Dead, 2002
- December Moon, Source Of Origin, 1996
