= Paul Ryan (musician and agent) =

British musician and talent agent

Paul Ryan is an English music agent and musician. Based in London, he is senior vice president and agent at The Team. He was the original guitarist for Cradle of Filth.

== Career ==
His first foray into the music industry was as the original guitarist for Cradle of Filth, along with his brother Benjamin Ryan, and school friend Daniel Davey. Ryan played with Cradle of Filth from its inception until they signed to Cacophonous Records in 1993.

After the recording of The Principle of Evil Made Flesh, Paul and Benjamin Ryan plus fellow guitarist Paul Allender left Cradle of Filth and would eventually form The Blood Divine in 1995. The Blood Divine recorded two albums and toured extensively for the next three years, until the band split in 1998.

Paul Ryan continued working as a musician until his career as a concert promoter took off, and he was offered a job with The Mean Fiddler Group. After two years with the Mean Fiddler he was approached by The Agency, and switched from concert promoter to booking agent.

The Agency Group was acquired by United Talent Agency where Paul Ryan still works after 16 years, with his roster of acts including Architects, Bring Me the Horizon, Cannibal Corpse, Good Charlotte, Killswitch Engage, Lamb of God, Paradise Lost and Trivium.
