= Cruelty and the Beast =

Studio album by Cradle of Filth
- Released: 5 May 1998
- Recorded: January–March 1998
- Studios: DEP International Studios/Abattoir Studios, Birmingham, England
- Genre: Extreme metal
- Length: 58:47
- Labels: Music for Nations (Europe); Mayhem (US)
- Producers: Jan Peter Genkel and Cradle of Filth

Cradle of Filth chronology
Dusk... and Her Embrace (1996)	Cruelty and the Beast (1998)	From the Cradle to Enslave (1999)

Singles from Cruelty and the Beast
- 1. "Twisted Nails of Faith" Released: 1998

Alternative covers
- Celtic Cross edition

Cruelty and the Beast is the third studio album by English extreme metal band Cradle of Filth, released on 5 May 1998 by Music for Nations. It is a concept album based on the legend of the Hungarian "blood countess" Elizabeth Báthory and features guest narration by actress Ingrid Pitt in-character as Báthory, a role she first played in the Hammer Horror film Countess Dracula in 1971.

The album, while positively received, was noted for its poor production by fans, critics and band members alike. A remixed and remastered edition, titled Cruelty and the Beast – Re-Mistressed, was released in November 2019.

== Recording and production ==
This was the last Cradle of Filth album to feature guitarist and songwriter Stuart Anstis and drummer Nick Barker, the first to feature guitarist Gian Pyres, and the only full-length album to feature keyboardist Lecter.

The production and mixing for Cruelty and the Beast has attracted some criticism, particularly for the sound quality of the drumming. Sarah Jezebel Deva revealed on the band's official messageboards: "[The production is] absolute rubbish. I remember when I first heard it – Dani played it – I walked out with tears in my eyes. I had spent twenty-five hours working in the studio on that album and it sounded like I had my head in a toilet [...] most of my vocals you couldn't hear." After exiting the room where she had heard the masters, she claimed to have bumped into drummer Nick Barker, who also expressed his dissatisfaction. In an interview with Scars and Guitars in 2020, Barker revealed that he had also cried due to intense frustration after hearing the mix and demanded that the album release be postponed. Barker also stated that the main songwriters, Stuart Anstis, Les Smith and himself originally requested that either Andy Sneap or Peter Tägtgren record the album, but were overridden by the demands of the label. Eventually the album did see a proper remix, where it was reissued in 2019 as Cruelty and the Beast - Re-Mistressed, resolving most of the sound problems that the record was initially criticized for.

== Release ==
Released on 5 May 1998 by record label Music for Nations, Cruelty and the Beast reached number 48 in the UK Albums Chart.

The album was reissued in a two-disc Special Edition by Koch in 2001 and by The End in 2012.

A completely remixed and remastered re-release of the album was planned for its 20th anniversary in late 2018. Producer Scott Atkins confirmed on his Instagram page on 9 October 2018 that the remix had been completed:

"Vinyl test pressings have arrived and all the mixes sent off. It’s been an endeavour. Lots of restoration work needed to be done, noise reduction, hum and hiss, crosstalk and bleed. No additional recording has taken place, myself and Dani wanted it faithful to the original just sonically better. The songs are really killer and finally have some real weight to them, which the original sorely lacked."

The following May, however, Atkins updated that unspecified "legal issues" continued to delay the release. With these issues apparently ironed out, a November 2019 release date for the newly titled Cruelty and the Beast: Remistressed was announced in late August 2019.

== Reception ==
Professional ratings
Review scores
Source	Rating
AllMusic	4/5 stars
Chronicles of Chaos	8/10
Collector's Guide to Heavy Metal	8/10
Encyclopedia of Popular Music	4/5 stars

The album ranked tenth in Kerrang!'s list of the top ten "essential black metal" albums in 2000.

== Track listing ==
All lyrics are written by Dani Filth; all music is composed by Cradle of Filth (Filth, Stuart Anstis, Gian Pyres, Robin Eaglestone, Les Smith and Nick Barker).

No.	Title	Length
1.	"Once Upon Atrocity" (instrumental)	1:43
2.	"Thirteen Autumns and a Widow"	7:14
3.	"Cruelty Brought Thee Orchids"	7:18
4.	"Beneath the Howling Stars"	7:42
5.	"Venus in Fear" (instrumental)	2:20
6.	"Desire in Violent Overture"	4:16
7.	"The Twisted Nails of Faith" (narration by Ingrid Pitt)	6:50
8.	"Bathory Aria": 1. "Benighted Like Usher"; 2. "A Murder of Ravens in Fugue"; 3. "Eyes That Witnessed Madness (narration by Ingrid Pitt)"	11:02
9.	"Portrait of the Dead Countess" (instrumental)	2:52
10.	"Lustmord and Wargasm (The Lick of Carnivorous Winds)"	7:30

Celtic Cross edition
No.	Title	Length
1.	"Once Upon Atrocity" (instrumental)	1:43
2.	"Thirteen Autumns and a Widow"	7:14
3.	"Cruelty Brought Thee Orchids"	7:18
4.	"Beneath The Howling Stars"	7:42
5.	"Venus in Fear" (instrumental)	2:20
6.	"Desire in Violent Overture"	4:16
7.	"The Twisted Nails of Faith"	6:51
8.	"Bathory Aria": 1. "Benighted Like Usher"; 2. "A Murder of Ravens in Fugue"; 3. "Eyes That Witnessed Madness"	11:02
9.	"Lustmord and Wargasm (The Relicking of Cadaverous Wounds)"	7:48
10.	"Black Metal" (Venom cover)	3:22
11.	"Hallowed Be Thy Name" (Iron Maiden cover. Sub-titled "Shallow Be My Grave" on this edition only.)	7:07
12.	"Sodomy and Lust" (Sodom cover)	4:44
13.	"Twisting Further Nails (The Cruci-Fiction Mix)"	5:32

Koch Records' 2001 two-disc edition bonus disc
No.	Title	Length
1.	"Lustmord and Wargasm (The Relicking of Cadaverous Wounds)"	7:58
2.	"Black Metal" (Venom cover)	3:27
3.	"Hallowed Be Thy Name" (Iron Maiden cover)	7:10
4.	"Sodomy & Lust" (Sodom cover)	4:47
5.	"Twisting Further Nails (The Cruci-Fiction Mix)"	5:33

Cruelty and the Beast: Re-Mistressed (2019)
No.	Title	Length
1.	"Once Upon Atrocity" (instrumental)	1:45
2.	"Thirteen Autumns and a Widow"	7:14
3.	"Cruelty Brought Thee Orchids"	7:18
4.	"Beneath The Howling Stars"	7:37
5.	"Venus in Fear" (instrumental)	2:20
6.	"Desire in Violent Overture"	4:16
7.	"The Twisted Nails of Faith"	6:49
8.	"Bathory Aria": 1. "Benighted Like Usher"; 2. "A Murder of Ravens in Fugue"; 3. "Eyes That Witnessed Madness"	11:00
9.	"Portrait of the Dead Countess" (instrumental)	2:51
10.	"Lustmord and Wargasm (The Lick of Carnivorous Winds)"	7:31
11.	"Hallowed Be Thy Name" (Iron Maiden cover)	7:13

== Personnel ==
Cradle of Filth

- Dani Filth – lead vocals
- Stuart Anstis – guitars
- Gian Pyres – guitars
- Robin Graves – bass
- Lecter – keyboards
- Nick Barker – drums
- Sarah Jezebel Deva – backing vocals

Guest/session musicians

- Danielle Cneajna Cottington – backing vocals
- Ingrid Pitt – Lady Bathory's narration on "The Twisted Nails of Faith" and Bathory Aria's "Eyes That Witnessed Madness"

Production

- Jan Peter Genkel – producer
- Dan Spriggs – engineer
- Mike Exeter – Production and additional engineering
- Mark Harwood – orchestral recordings at Springvale Studios, Ipswich
- Stu Williamson – sleeve photography
- Louisa Morando – cover art model

== Charts ==
Year	Chart	Position
1998	Finnish Albums Chart	13
1998	Austrian Albums Chart	24
1998	French Albums Chart	34
1998	GfK Dutch Chart	37
1998	German Albums Chart	47
1998	UK Albums Chart	48
