= Midian (album) =

Studio album by Cradle of Filth
- Released: 30 October 2000
- Recorded: 21 June–August 2000
- Studios: Parkgate Studios (Battle, East Sussex, England)
- Genre: Extreme metal
- Length: 58:52
- Labels: Music for Nations (Europe); Koch (US)
- Producer: John Fryer

Cradle of Filth chronology
From the Cradle to Enslave (1999)	Midian (2000)	Bitter Suites to Succubi (2001)

Singles from Midian
- 1. "Her Ghost in the Fog" Released: 30 October 2000

Alternate cover
- Limited leather "digibook" edition

Midian is the fourth studio album by English extreme metal band Cradle of Filth. It was released on 30 October 2000 through Music for Nations. The album marks the return of guitarist Paul Allender to the band, as well as the introduction of drummer Adrian Erlandsson (At the Gates, The Haunted) and keyboard player Martin Powell (My Dying Bride, Anathema). It also features Doug Bradley (Hellraiser, Hellbound) as the narrator for various songs.

== Thematic inspiration ==
Midian is inspired by English author Clive Barker's novel Cabal and his subsequent film version Nightbreed. Dani Filth explained to the magazine Empire in September 2012:

We loved Cabal, The Damnation Game and The Books of Blood, and we liked that everything had "Clive Barker presents..." on it before people even knew who he was. That gave it an air of mystery: you should know who this is, but you don't. Midian kind of is and isn't a concept album: as a title, it just made perfect sense. The central song, "Tortured Soul Asylum", is about Midian, and the characters in the rest [of the album] made up a sort of collective from this mythical place where the monsters live.

Doug Bradley, who played the role of Lylesberg in Nightbreed (but is better known as Pinhead from Barker's Hellraiser and its sequels), provides narration on some tracks.

In the Bible, the "Midianites" are an Arab tribe descended from Abraham, and Midian itself is where Moses spent his forty-year exile from Egypt. The biblical Midianites take their name from Midian, a son of Abraham, and one of his concubines. Today, the former territory of Midian is found through small portions of western Saudi Arabia, southern Jordan, southern Israel and the Sinai. The people of Midian are also mentioned extensively in the Qur'an, where the name appears in Arabic as Madyan. The Midian of Cabal and Nightbreed is a hidden city west of Calgary in Alberta, Canada, offering shelter for monsters away from humanity.

The song "Cthulhu Dawn" invokes the character from horror writer H. P. Lovecraft's Cthulhu Mythos.

The opening line of "Lord Abortion" ("Care for a little necrophilia?") is a quote from Terry Gilliam's film Brazil (voiced by Kim Greist in the film, but delivered here by Toni King, frontman Dani Filth's former wife).

== Release ==
Midian was released on 30 October 2000 by record label Music for Nations. It reached number 63 in the UK Albums Chart. The cover was by the artist J.K. Potter. It was subsequently also used as the jacket for Potter's 2002 horror fiction anthology Embrace the Mutation.

"Her Ghost in the Fog" spawned a music video, which received heavy rotation on MTV2 and other rock channels, and was directed by Alex Chandon (who also directed the 2001 horror film Cradle of Fear in which Dani Filth appeared). "Her Ghost in the Fog" appeared on the soundtrack for Ginger Snaps in 2000 and in the video game Brütal Legend in 2009.

The album was reissued in 2012 by The End.

== Critical reception ==
Professional ratings
Review scores
Source	Rating
AllMusic	3/5 stars
Chronicles of Chaos	8.5/10
Collector's Guide to Heavy Metal	9/10
Encyclopedia of Popular Music	3/5 stars
Exclaim!	favourable
Kerrang!	5/5 stars
Metal Rules	4.5/5
NME	7/10
Rock Sound	5/5 stars

NME called it "one of the most ludicrous records you'll ever hear", though their review was favourable. In 2020, it was named one of the 20 best metal albums of 2000 by Metal Hammer magazine.

== Track listing ==
All lyrics are written by Dani Filth; all music is composed by Cradle of Filth, except "For Those Who Died" written by Andy Sneap and Martin Walkyier.

No.	Title	Length
1.	"At the Gates of Midian" (Instrumental)	2:21
2.	"Cthulhu Dawn"	4:17
3.	"Saffron's Curse"	6:32
4.	"Death Magick for Adepts"	5:53
5.	"Lord Abortion"	6:51
6.	"Amor e morte"	6:44
7.	"Creatures That Kissed in Cold Mirrors" (Instrumental)	3:00
8.	"Her Ghost in the Fog"	6:24
9.	"Satanic Mantra"	0:51
10.	"Tearing the Veil from Grace"	8:13
11.	"Tortured Soul Asylum"	7:46

Limited leather "digibook"/Japanese edition
No.	Title	Length
12.	"For Those Who Died" (Sabbat cover, featuring Martin Walkyier – mis-titled "For Those Who Have Died" on UK digibook cover and Japanese CD liner.)	6:16

== Personnel ==
Cradle of Filth

- Dani Filth – lead vocals
- Paul Allender – guitars
- Gian Pyres – guitars
- Robin Graves – bass
- Martin Powell – keyboards
- Adrian Erlandsson – drums
- Sarah Jezebel Deva – backing vocals

Guest/session musicians

- Martin Walkyier – vocals on "For Those Who Died"
- Mika Lindberg – backing vocals
- Doug Bradley – narration on "Death Magick for Adepts", "Her Ghost in the Fog" and "Tortured Soul Asylum"
- Toni King – voice on "Lord Abortion"
- Andy Nice – cello

Production

- John Fryer – producer, engineer, mixing
- Doug Cook – engineer, mixing
- Jamie Morrison – assistant engineer
- Ray Staff – mastering

== Charts ==
Year	Chart	Position
2000	Finnish Albums Chart	11
2000	Heatseekers Albums (USA)	21
2000	German Albums Chart	30
2000	GfK Dutch Chart	41
2000	Ultratop Belgian Chart (Flanders)	47
2000	French Albums Chart	50
2000	Swedish Albums Chart	57
2000	UK Albums Chart	63
