= Paul Allender =

British extreme metal guitarist (born 1970)

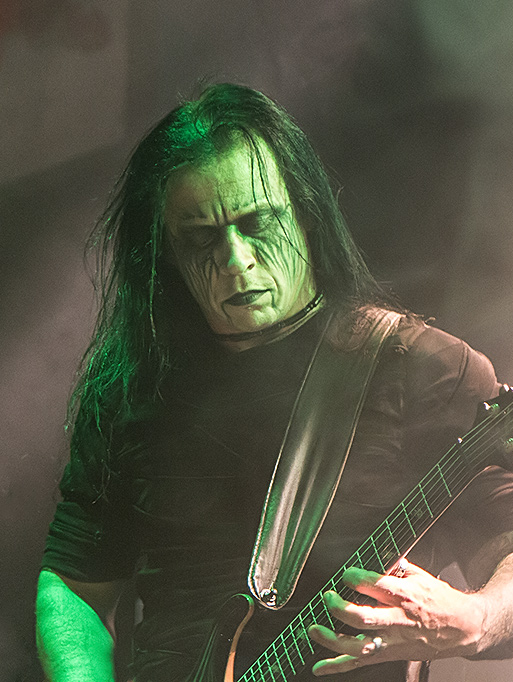
- Allender in 2012

Background information
- Born: Paul James Allender; 17 November 1970 (age 55); Colchester, England
- Genres: Extreme metal
- Occupations: Musician, Songwriter
- Instrument: Guitar
- Years active: 1992–present

Paul James Allender (born 17 November 1970) is an English guitarist, best known for his work with the English extreme metal band Cradle of Filth. He was a longtime member with stints in the band from 1992 to 1995 and then again from 1999 to 2014.

== Cradle of Filth ==
He joined the band as the guitarist late 1991, and stayed until late 1994 when he left Cradle of Filth to join The Blood Divine. In 1998 Paul Allender started another band called Primary Slave. In 2000, just before Primary Slave signed a recording contract, he rejoined Cradle of Filth on the band's album, Midian after receiving a call from Dani Filth, along with drummer Adrian Erlandsson and keyboardist Martin Powell.

In April of 2014, Paul Allender once again left Cradle of Filth.

== White Empress ==
In 2013, Allender was involved with the formation of a new project named "White Empress". In an interview with "The Age of Metal", White Empress vocalist Mary Zimmer (formerly of Luna Mortis), said:

Paul and I actually have a number of mutual friends and acquaintances and it was Melissa Ferlaak of Plague of Stars (formerly of Visions of Atlantis, Aesma Daeva, Echoterra) who put us in touch with each other. We talked about working on some new music together and he set me the instrumental tracks he'd been working on. They were phenomenal and I decided to lay down vocals for 3 songs. Everything went really well together and we made an official band. White Empress is really all about the concept of "The Empress". The entire band is in essence "The Empress". She's her own creative concept, her own image, her own identity that comes from all of us in the band (meaning I'm not the Empress, necessarily). White Empress is an entire band with a fantasy avatar. It's visual and audio all tied into one huge concept. The band is fantastic, we all contribute equally to the creative process and we've come up with some amazing things for everyone. The Empress is Coming!!

An EP was released in January 2014. Their debut album - Rise of the Empress - was released through Peaceville Records on 29 September 2014. It was initially funded through a Pledge Music campaign.

In 2016, Allender changed the direction of the project, removing all of the singing and replacing it with narration. The band then had the style of a horror audiobook with cinematic film. White Empress released the single "Revenant" in 2016, and then went on indefinite hiatus.

== Playing style ==
Speaking on his playing style, Allender has said:

"To tell you the truth... I don't jam. I've always played what actually I see in my head. Therefore, when I play, I don't use any specific scales or anything in order or that's musically correct or anything... I've always concentrated on mixing lead-oriented riffs, but in like a rhythmic sense. That's the way I've always been because I've never really been interested in doing ultra-fast lead work. I've always mixed the two up. Just concentrating on the 16th notes and stuff on the right hand, making sure it all sinks in. It's the guitar and it's the way we dress onstage, it's all part of this troupe, this uniformed-like togetherness... It just comes out dark as fuck".

== Graphic art ==
Allender also has an art side project known as "Vomitorium: The Dark Art Of Cindy Frey And Paul Allender". He also produced the artwork for New Project's debut album Ultraviolent Light.
