= Devilment =

British metal band

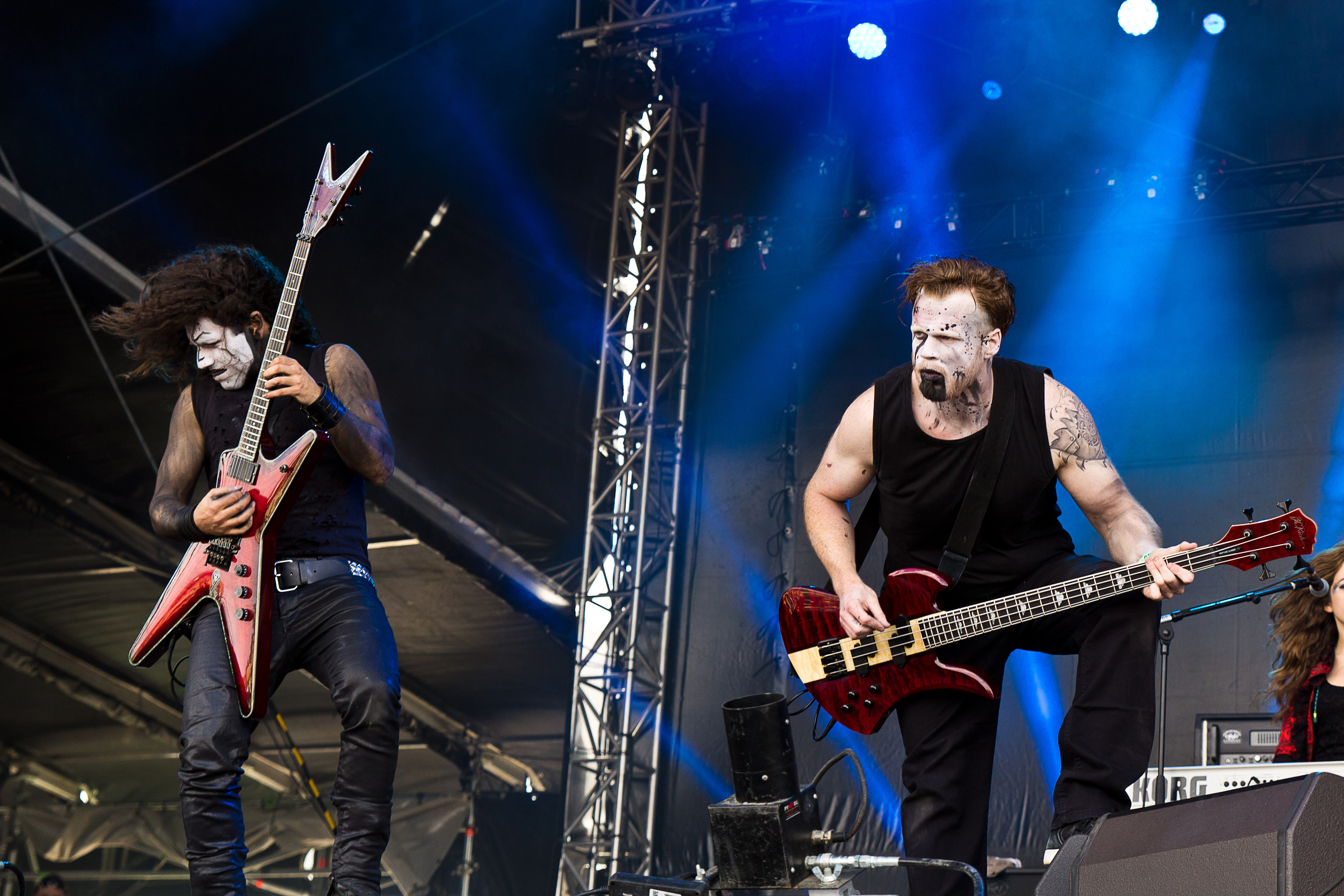
- Devilment at Rockharz Open Air, Germany, 2015

Background information
- Origin: Suffolk, England
- Genres: Gothic metal, groove metal
- Years active: 2011–2019
- Label: Nuclear Blast
- Members: Dani Filth; Colin Parks; Nik Sampson; Chris Casket; Anabelle Iratni
- Past members: Daniel Finch; Dan Jackson; Aaron Boast; Lauren Francis; Sam S. Junior; Nick Johnson; Caroline Campbell; Matt Alston

Devilment are a British metal band originally formed in late 2011 by guitarist Daniel Finch. The band experienced problems finding a stable vocalist until Dani Filth from the extreme metal band Cradle of Filth joined. They released their first studio album, The Great and Secret Show, in November 2014.

== History ==
=== 2011–2012: Beginning and Grotescapology demo ===
Originally formed as a solo project by Daniel Finch in late 2001 under the name Brutal Grooves Inc. In 2011 Finch set about putting a band together hiring Simon Dawson (drums) Justin Walker (bass) and Kieron De Manns (guitar). The band experienced trouble finding a stable vocalist until Finch's friend, Dani Filth (Cradle of Filth) agreed to help out on a couple of tracks. 'When I heard what Dan Finch was doing, I just had to get my claws into it. It had a unique sound to it that was both creepy and heavy but indelibly groovy. I instantly saw where we could take this beast...'

This turned into a studio demo, known as Grotescapology, completed after Dani finished work on Cradle of Filth's album The Manticore and Other Horrors in October 2012. The demo featured eight tracks, which were used solely as a backbone for a new line-up when their drummer and two other members departed the group.

=== 2012–2013: New band members and preparing for The Great and Secret Show ===
Nick Johnson (bass), Colin Parks (lead guitar), Lauren Francis (vocals and keyboards), and Aaron Boast (percussion) joined the band soon after, and 2013 became a productive time for the band as they gained worldwide press and aired demo tracks on various radio shows.

September 2013 saw the band enter Grindstone Studios in Suffolk with Producer Scott Atkins, who previously worked with the likes of Cradle of Filth, Behemoth, Amon Amarth, Sylosis and Gama Bomb. The band completed 13 tracks, including a cover of Midnight Oil's hit "Beds Are Burning" featuring guest vocals courtesy of Dani's long-term friend Bam Margera of MTV's Jackass and Viva La Bam.

'When I asked Bam if he would sing on it, he was instantly all over it. He went and undertook his vocals in Philadelphia with a well-known producer and now intends to put the track on his new movie, which is frankly, awesome of him'.

=== 2014–present: The Great and Secret Show ===
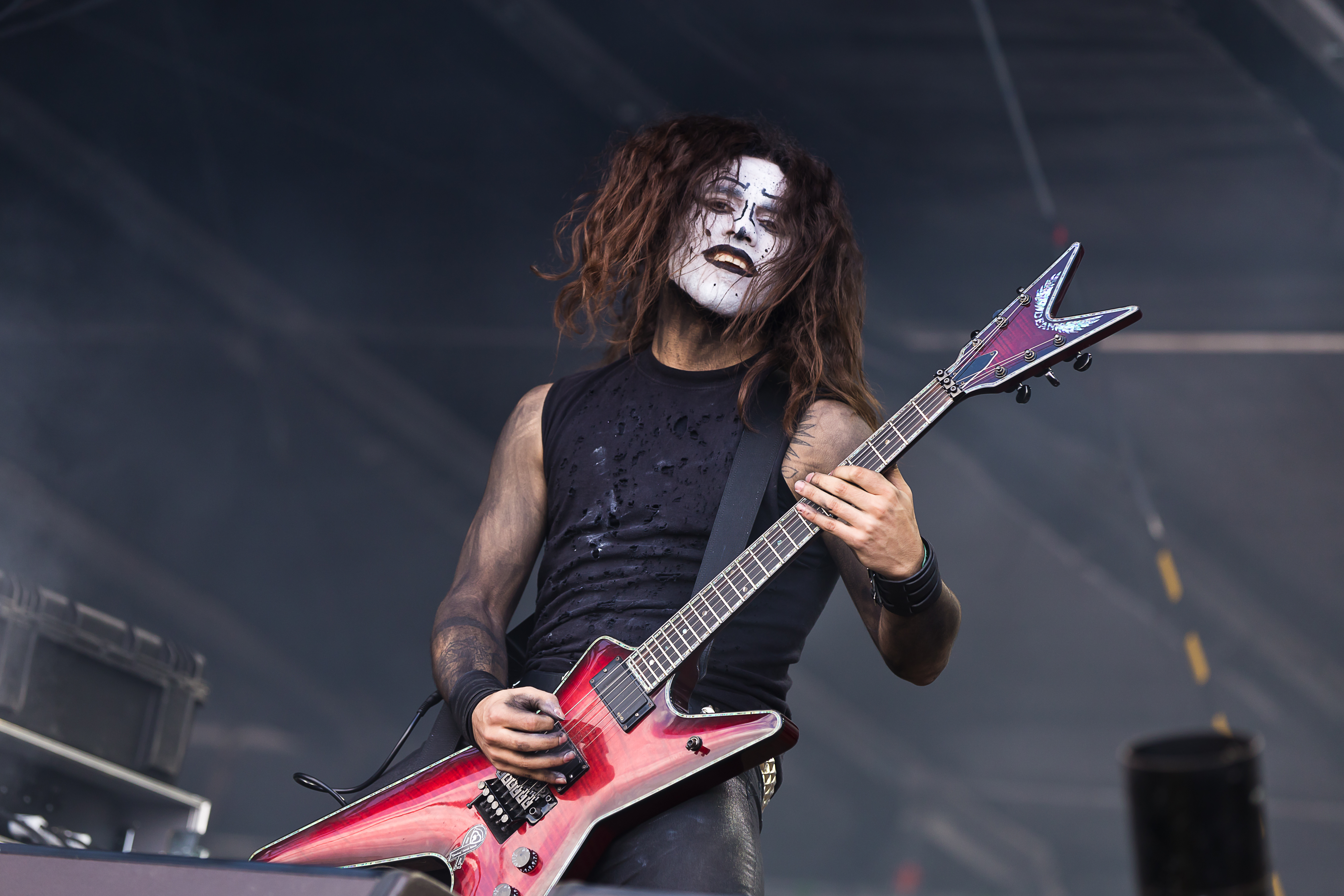
Sam S. Junior at Rockharz Open Air 2015

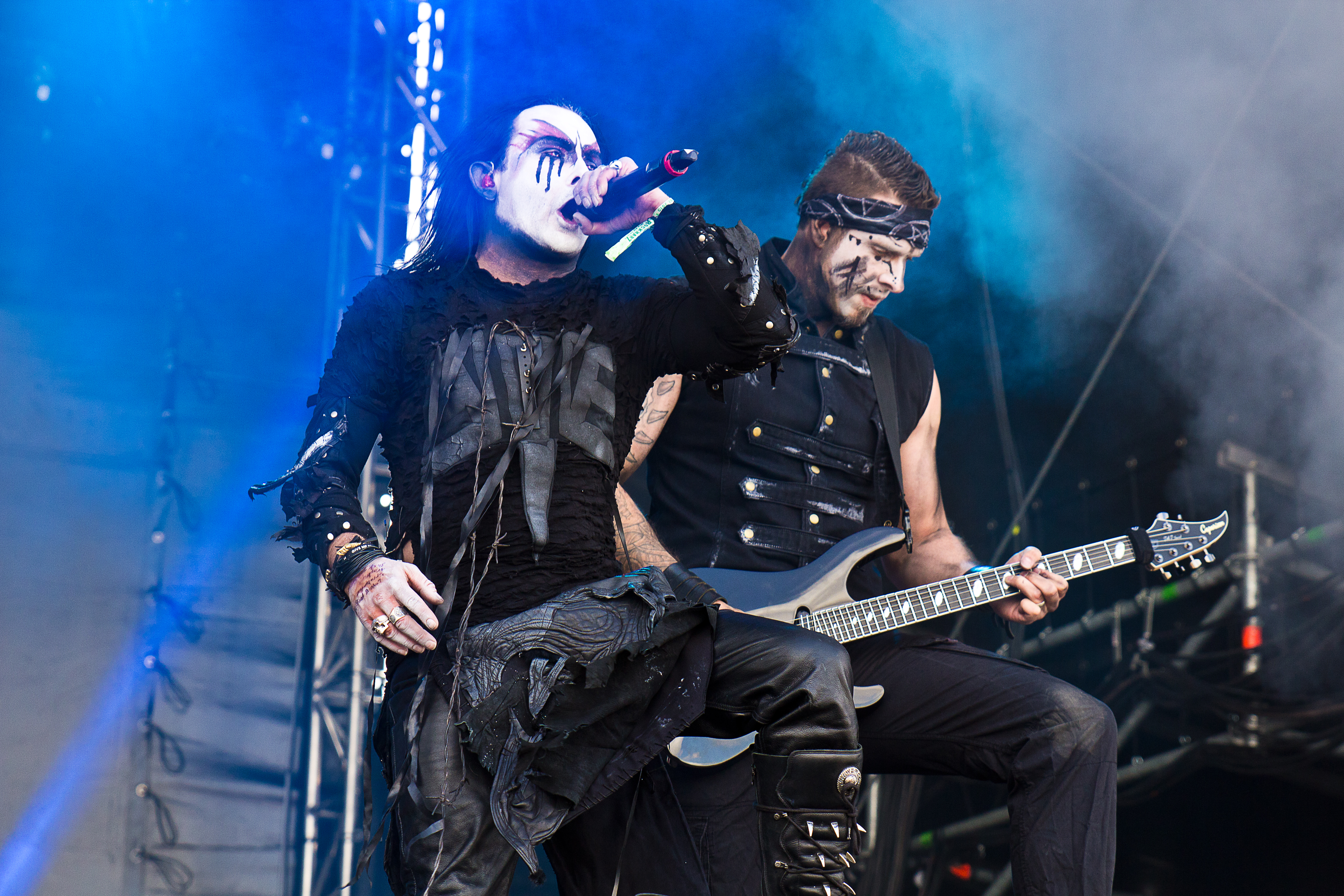
Dani Filth and Colin Parks at Rockharz Open Air 2015

The Great and Secret Show was released on 3 November 2014. The album also closes with an orchestral rendition of 'Even Your Blood Group Rejects Me' by Spencer Creaghan. Following the release of the album, Devilment went on a European tour with Lacuna Coil and Motionless in White in November 2014.

Describing the album's lyrical themes, Dani said, 'The album ... concerns itself with the occult pulse behind the world, a land of imagination that can be slipped into at will. Like a generator buzzing behind everything. The truth behind the Wizard's curtain. A phantasmagorical nightscape. A wonderland. A midnight playground. The fertile land of the dead.'

Founding member Daniel Finch left in late 2014.

The band released their second album The Mephisto Waltzes in November 2016 via Nuclear Blast. The album saw the band take on a more mature dark wave vibe, moving away from the heavy groove of the debut whilst maintaining the true essence of the Devilment sound. It also brought the vocal talents of Lauren Francis forward into the spot light with Scott Atkins again at the production helm. The album was the first to see Parks & Francis writing, but with outside help from composer John Phipps who penned the band's debut video for "Hitchcock Blonde".

It was the first album to feature new drummer Matt Alston who replaced Aaron Boast the previous years. A successful album release and tour followed playing in the UK in December leading to August 2017 when the band played the main stage at the UK's Bloodstock Festival. In November 2017, it was announced that Caroline Campbell formerly of Cradle of Filth will be taking on vocals and keyboard duties on the band's shows in December 2017. Lead guitarist Colin Parks has said that he is currently working on the third album.

== Band members ==
Current members

- Dani Filth – lead vocals (2011–present)
- Colin Parks – lead guitar (2013–present)
- Nik Sampson – rhythm guitar (2016–present)
- Chris Casket – bass (2018–present)
- Anabelle Iratni – keyboards, female vocals (2018–present)

Past members

- Daniel J. Finch – rhythm guitar, keyboards, samples (2011–2014)
- Simon Dawson – drums (2011–2012)
- Kieron De-Courci – keyboards, samples (2011–2012)
- Kevin Jackson – bass (2011–2012)
- Justin Walker – bass (2011)
- Kieron De Manns – lead guitar (2011)
- Nick Johnson – bass (2012–2018)
- Lauren Francis – keyboards, female vocals (2012–2017)
- Aaron Boast – drums (2012–2016)
- Dan Jackson – lead guitar (2012–2013)
- Sam S. Junior – rhythm guitar (2015)
- Matt Alston – drums (2016–2019)
- Caroline Campbell – keyboards, female vocals (2017–2018)

Timeline

== Discography ==
Studio albums

- The Great and Secret Show (2014)
- II – The Mephisto Waltzes (2016)

Demos

- Grotescapology (2012)
- Demo 3 (2013)

Singles

- "Mother Kali" (2014)
- "Even Your Blood Group Rejects Me" (2014)
- "Sanity Hits a (Perfect) Zero" (2015)
- "Under the Thunder" (2016)
- "Hitchcock Blonde" (2016)
- "Full Dark, No Stars" (2016)
