= Existence Is Futile (Cradle of Filth album) =

2021 studio album by Cradle of Filth

Studio album by Cradle of Filth
- Released: 22 October 2021
- Recorded: February–October 2020
- Studios: Grindstone Studios (Suffolk, England)
- Genre: Extreme metal
- Length: 56:40
- Label: Nuclear Blast
- Producer: Scott Atkins

Cradle of Filth chronology
| Cryptoriana – The Seductiveness of Decay (2017) | Existence Is Futile (2021) | Trouble and Their Double Lives (2023) |

Singles from Existence Is Futile
- 1. "Crawling King Chaos" Released: 30 July 2021; 2. "Necromantic Fantasies" Released: 15 September 2021

Professional ratings
Aggregate scores
| Source | Rating |
|---|---|
| Metacritic | 83/100 |
Review scores
| Source | Rating |
| AllMusic | 4/5 stars |
| Blabbermouth.net | 8.5/10 |
| Kerrang! | 4/5 |

Existence Is Futile is the thirteenth studio album by English extreme metal band Cradle of Filth, released on 22 October 2021 through Nuclear Blast. It is the band's only album to feature keyboardist and female vocalist Anabelle Iratni and the last album with guitarist Richard Shaw before his departure in May 2022. This album also saw the return of Doug Bradley to provide narration for two tracks. It is the sixth Cradle of Filth release on which he appears, but the first since 2011's Evermore Darkly.

== Background ==
Describing the album's style, frontman Dani Filth said:

Fast and slow parts (and faster still), new delectable flavours and those reminiscent of earlier COF albums galore, massive choruses and melancholic drop-downs, old skool melodic NWOBM amid furious, scathing black metal amid apocalyptic groove. But I would say it's not very different from 'Cryptoriana'. It's not as intricately laced. That album spoke of the times it was trying to assimilate and represent. This album is about existential terror. The threat of everything. The end of the world, the end of one's life, existential dread. A little hope, I guess in there. It's a CRADLE OF FILTH record. The songs are strong. They're extreme, but it's a mixture of everything.

== Artwork ==
The artwork was created by Arthur Berzinsh, who also worked on Hammer of the Witches and Cryptoriana – The Seductiveness of Decay. For Existence Is Futile he took inspiration from The Garden of Earthly Delights by Dutch artist Hieronymus Bosch; in particular, the "Prince of Hell" in the right "hellscape" panel of the triptych.

== Critical reception ==
The album received positive reviews from music critics upon the album's release.

At Metacritic, which assigns a normalized rating out of 100 to reviews from mainstream critics, the album has an average score of 83 based on 4 reviews, indicating "Universal acclaim". AllMusic gave the album a positive review, saying, "The band's grandiose hellscapes can sometimes feel like horror-fiction cosplay, but in trading some of the myth and magic for the genuine torment of existential dread, they've managed to produce their most humanistic work to date."

Blabbermouth.net gave the album a positive review, stating "In fact, it's that slight hint that CRADLE OF FILTH are commenting on real-world events, arguably for the first time, that gives "Existence Is Futile" its unique edge. This is a top-notch album that fans of the band will instantly adore, but it's also a restless and authentically unsettling affair; reflective of the dark times we live in, but also a sincere tribute to the sturdiness our collective resolve as followers of the dark musical arts. If a band of this vintage can rage against the dying of the light with this much style, substance and intensity, there may yet be hope for the rest of us."

Kerrang! gave the album 4 out of 5 and stated: "True enough. And only a band so conversant in morbidity, metal and gallows wit could articulate it so brilliantly as this. If you've slept on Cradle of Filth recently, now is your chance to redeem yourself. For those who know - they're back at their hellish best."

== Track listing ==
| No. | Title | Length |
|---|---|---|
| 1. | "The Fate of the World on Our Shoulders" (Instrumental) | 1:37 |
| 2. | "Existential Terror" | 6:17 |
| 3. | "Necromantic Fantasies" | 5:40 |
| 4. | "Crawling King Chaos" | 5:27 |
| 5. | "Here Comes a Candle... (Infernal Lullaby)" (Instrumental) | 1:28 |
| 6. | "Black Smoke Curling from the Lips of War" | 5:21 |
| 7. | "Discourse Between a Man and His Soul" | 5:30 |
| 8. | "The Dying of the Embers" | 6:08 |
| 9. | "Ashen Mortality" (Instrumental) | 1:50 |
| 10. | "How Many Tears to Nurture a Rose?" | 4:34 |
| 11. | "Suffer Our Dominion" | 6:22 |
| 12. | "Us, Dark, Invincible" | 6:26 |
| Total length: | | 56:40 |

Digital and deluxe edition
| No. | Title | Length |
|---|---|---|
| 13. | "Sisters of the Mist" | 7:14 |
| 14. | "Unleash the Hellion" | 6:23 |
| Total length: | | 70:17 |

== Personnel ==
Credits for Existence Is Futile adapted from liner notes.

Cradle of Filth

- Dani Filth – lead vocals
- Richard Shaw – guitars
- Ashok – guitars
- Daniel Firth – bass
- Marthus – drums, keyboards, orchestration
- Anabelle Iratni – keyboards, female vocals, orchestration, lyre

Additional personnel

- Doug Bradley – narration on "Suffer Our Dominion", and "Sisters of the Mist"

Production

- Scott Atkins – production
- Arthur Berzinsh – cover art
- Dani Filth – lyrics
- Dan Goldsworthy – layout, illustrations
- Jon Phipps – choir arrangements
- James Sharrock – photography

== Charts ==
Chart performance for Existence Is Futile
| Chart (2021) | Peak position |
|---|---|
| Australian Albums (ARIA) | 82 |
| Austrian Albums (Ö3 Austria) | 12 |
| Belgian Albums (Ultratop Flanders) | 43 |
| Belgian Albums (Ultratop Wallonia) | 37 |
| Dutch Albums (Album Top 100) | 38 |
| Finnish Albums (Suomen virallinen lista) | 4 |
| German Albums (Offizielle Top 100) | 9 |
| Italian Albums (FIMI) | 61 |
| Polish Albums (ZPAV) | 30 |
| Scottish Albums (Official Charts) | 18 |
| Swiss Albums (Schweizer Hitparade) | 20 |
| UK Albums (Official Charts) | 68 |
| UK Independent Albums (Official Charts) | 5 |
| UK Rock & Metal Albums (Official Charts) | 3 |
