= Party Cannon =

Scottish death metal band

- The band's logo

Background information
- Origin: Dunfermline, Fife, Scotland
- Genres: Slam metal, grindcore
- Years active: 2010–present
- Labels: Unique Leader; Autopsy; Gore House Productions
- Members: Daryl Boyce; Craig Robinson; Mike McLaughlin; Chris Ryan; Martin Gazur
- Past members: Neal Mullen; Tony Reddie; Jack Welsh; Doog Harden

Party Cannon are a slam death metal band from Dunfermline, Scotland, formed in 2010.

== History ==
The band consists of vocalist Daryl Boyce, guitarists Craig Robinson and Mike McLaughlin, bassist Chris Ryan, and drummer Martin Gazur.

After self-releasing a promo CD in 2012, the group released the EP Partied In Half on Autopsy Records. It was reissued with bonus tracks in 2014 and 2020 by the U.S. label Gore House Productions. In early July 2015, the band released their debut album, Bong Hit Hospitalisation. At the end of that month, the group played their first concert in the United States at the San Francisco Bay Area Deathfest.

In 2015, the band's unusual logo for the genre caused a stir, went viral, and earned Party Cannon the title of "death metal band with the least death metal-like logo".

In 2017, the band released their second EP, Perverse Party Platter. This was followed in 2019 by the split album Cannons of Gore Soaked, Blood Drenched, Parasitic Sickness, on which they contributed three tracks. Other bands involved in the split were Parasitic Ejaculation, Bloodscribe, and Gorevent. Two years later, they released the 7″ single Nauseating and Unpalatable. The following year saw the release of their second studio album, Volumes of Vomit. It was produced by Jörg Uken of Temple of Dread at Soundlodge Studios and features guest appearances from Ross Sewage of Exhumed, Don Campan of Waking the Cadaver, and Andrew Lomastro of Cerebral Incubation.

In an interview with Distorted Sound magazine in April 2022, bassist Chris Ryan explained that the album was originally intended for release in 2017, but couldn't be realized due to a tight tour schedule. Instead, the five songs written up to that point were released as an EP. Three more songs were later released on a split release shortly before a tour in Asia. According to Ryan, the COVID-19 pandemic was the best thing that could have happened to the band, as it gave them the necessary time to write enough material for an album.

In July 2022, Party Cannon played a concert in Slovenia as part of MetalDays. In the same year, the group played at the Bloodstock Open Air festival in England. They had to cancel a performance the previous year due to illness within the band. In the same month, Party Cannon supported the American band Gwar on their United Kingdom tour. Earlier in March, the band toured the United States as the support act for Wormhole. In August 2023, the group played at Summer Breeze Open Air in Germany for the first time. On February 29, 2024, the group announced that they had signed with Unique Leader Records and would release their third album, Injuries Are Inevitable, worldwide in April.

In March 2026, Party Cannon released the EP Subjected To A Partying. The EP was released on a Nintendo 64 Game Pak. The cover features a cartoon of a decapitated man in a chair surrounded by colorful characters, possibly a parody of Devourment's 1999 album Molesting the Decapitated. The title is also likely a reference to the Dying Fetus song "Subjected to a Beating" from their 2012 album Reign Supreme. They went on tour from April 22 to May 1 in the United Kingdom with Internal Bleeding and Sherwood Webber of Skinless.

== Style ==
The group describes their music as an "IQ-lowering" and "party slam": brutal early 2000s death metal in the style of Dying Fetus and Carcass mixed with "crushing disappointment".

Alex S., in his review of the debut album Bong Hit Hospitalisation, wrote that Party Cannon managed to create a healthy mix of comedy, brutality, and gore. The ten songs were characterized by hard snare hits and fast guitar riffs. The tempo frequently slowed down, only to be accelerated again a few bars later. Olly Thomas of the British magazine Kerrang! placed the group within the slam death metal genre, writing that the group stood out from other bands not only because of their sense of humor, but also because of their logo and song titles. Musically, the band occasionally veer towards grindcore. The British magazine Metal Hammer included Volumes of Vomit in its list of the ten best death metal albums of 2022 and described the album as a "spitting, snarling, and puking beast".

The group dedicated a song to the episode Dennō Senshi Porigon of the Pokémon franchise. The song "I Believe in Dani Filth" and its accompanying music video are a tribute to the Cradle of Filth singer and the video game Street Fighter II. The band's name is a reference to a confetti cannon.

== Discography ==
=== Studio albums ===
- Bong Hit Hospitalisation (2015)
- Cannons of Gore Soaked, Blood Drenched, Parasitic Sickness (2019)
- Volumes of Vomit (2022)
- Injuries Are Inevitable (2024)

=== EPs ===
- Partied in Half (EP, 2013)
- Perverse Party Platter (EP, 2017)
- Subjected To A Partying (EP, 2026)

=== CDs ===
- Party Promo (Promo-CD, 2012)
