= Grotescapology =

Demo album by Devilment
- Released: 2012
- Recorded: 2011–2012
- Genre: Gothic metal
- Length: 35:23
- Label: Independent

Devilment chronology
Grotescapology (2012)	The Great and Secret Show (2014)

Grotescapology is the first demo CD by British gothic metal band Devilment. It was released in 2012 independently.

== Track listing ==
No.	Title	Writer(s)	Length
1.	"Grotescapology"	Finch	02:46
2.	"Return of the Slaves"	Finch	05:01
3.	"Bloodlust, Rust and Empire"	Finch	04:44
4.	"Psycho Babble"	Finch	05:22
5.	"The Stake in My Heart"	Finch	04:46
6.	"Even Your Blood Group Rejects Me"	Finch	05:42
7.	"Staring at the Werewolf Corps"	Finch	07:02

== Members ==
- Dani Filth – vocals
- Dan Jackson – lead guitar
- Daniel John Finch – rhythm guitar
- Kev Jackson – bass
- Kieron De Manns – keyboards, samples
- Simon Dawson – drums
- David Jimmy James – additional keyboards
