= The Great and Secret Show (album) =

Studio album by Devilment
- Released: 31 October 2014
- Genre: Gothic metal, groove metal
- Length: 70:30
- Label: Nuclear Blast

Devilment chronology
Grotescapology (2012)	The Great and Secret Show (2014)	Devilment II: The Mephisto Waltzes (2016)

Singles from Hammer of the Witches
- 1. "Mother Kali" Released: 15 August 2014; 2. "Even Your Blood Group Rejects Me" Released: 29 September 2014; 3. "Sanity Hits a (Perfect) Zero" Released: August 2015

Professional ratings
Review scores
Source	Rating
Louder	3/5 stars
Metal Hammer	5/7
metal.de	7/10
Ghost Cult Magazine	7/10

The Great and Secret Show is the debut album by the British metal band Devilment, released in 2014 on Nuclear Blast.

== Development ==
In September 2013, the band entered Grindstone Studios in Suffolk with producer Scott Atkins, who had previously worked with bands including Cradle of Filth, Behemoth, Amon Amarth, Sylosis and Gama Bomb.

== Track listing ==
The limited edition of the album contains 13 tracks, closing with an orchestral rendition of "Even Your Blood Group Rejects Me" by soundtrack maestro Spencer Creaghan. Another track is a cover of Midnight Oil's classic "Beds Are Burning", with guest vocals by Dani Filth's long-term friend Bam Margera of Jackass fame.

No.	Title	Writer(s)	Length
1.	"Summer Arteries"	Colin Parks	6:14
2.	"Even Your Blood Group Rejects Me"	Daniel J Finch	5:24
3.	"Girl from Mystery Island"	Finch	5:50
4.	"The Stake in My Heart"	Finch/Parks	4:42
5.	"Living in the Fungus"	Finch	5:44
6.	"Mother Kali"	Finch	3:44
7.	"Staring at the Werewolf Corps"	Finch	6:45
8.	"Sanity Hits a (Perfect) Zero"	Parks	6:09
9.	"Laudanum Skull"	Finch	5:16
10.	"The Great and Secret Show"	Finch/Parks/Nick Johnson/Lauren Francis	5:33

Limited edition bonus tracks
No.	Title	Writer(s)	Length
11.	"Beds Are Burning" (Midnight Oil cover, feat. Bam Margera)	Rob Hirst/Jim Moginie/Peter Garrett	4:30
12.	"Psycho Babble"	Finch	5:20
13.	"Even Your Blood Group Rejects Me (Motion Picture Soundtrack)" (instrumental)	Finch	5:26
Total length:			70:30

== Personnel ==
=== Band members ===
- Dani Filth – vocals
- Colin Parks – lead guitar
- Daniel J Finch – guitar, keyboards
- Nick Johnson – bass
- Aaron Boast – drums
- Lauren Francis – keyboards, vocals

=== Additional personnel ===
- Bam Margera – additional vocals on "Beds Are Burning"
