= Boys are stupid, throw rocks at them! controversy =

Clothing design controversy

Cover of the Boys Are Stupid, Throw Rocks at Them! book

"Boys are stupid, throw rocks at them!" is a slogan on a T-shirt by Florida clothing company David and Goliath. In 2003, the shirt became the subject of a campaign by radio-host and men's rights activist Glenn Sacks on the grounds of misandry and the incitement of violence against men and boys. This raised national attention and led to the removal of the shirts from several thousand retail outlets.

The publicity of the campaign increased sales of the shirt, which features the slogan printed next to a cartoon image of a boy running away from five stones flying in his direction, which was later used as the cover of a book which was also titled Boys Are Stupid, Throw Rocks at Them!

== T-shirt ==
The T-shirt was designed by company founder Todd Goldman, who started David and Goliath in 1999 with "Boys are Smelly" T-shirts. It now features clothes with a variety of slogans, such as "Boys tell lies, poke them in the eyes!" or "The stupid factory, where boys are made". "Boys are stupid ..." has evolved into a successful object for merchandise, which includes all types of clothes, mugs, keychains, posters and other items. In 2005, Goldman published a book with the same title.

== Reaction ==
Los Angeles based radio host and men's rights activist Glenn Sacks initiated a campaign against the T-shirts in 2003. He claimed that they were part of a general societal mood that stigmatizes and victimizes boys. The company says that the shirts are not meant to encourage violence. According to Goldman, the controversy boosted sales of the T-shirt. In Canada, the complaints by the Canadian Children's Rights Council resulted in numerous major retail chain stores stopping their sales of the merchandise. Other retailers who pulled the merchandise included Bon-Macy's, Tillys, and Claire's.

Helen Grieco, executive director of the National Organization for Women, stated, "No, I don't think the shirts are cute. But I spend every day on life-and-death issues and don't have time for T-shirt campaigns." She went on to state that while she believed the US needed a men's rights movement, she didn't think Sacks should be the one doing it, calling him a "women-bashing, backlash shock-jock radio host." San Francisco Chronicle columnist Jane Ganahl ridiculed Sacks' efforts in an article, saying, "shut up and get a life, already". Glenn Sacks responded to criticism of the campaign, asserting that the criticism was dismissive of the feelings of boys and that the idea that boys should laugh at the joke at their expense creates a double bind for boys.

== See also ==
- Abercrombie & Fitch § Product criticism
- Gamergate – Misogynistic online harassment campaign
- Masculism – Advocacy for the rights and interests of males
- Vestal Masturbation T-shirt – 1993 band merchandise
