= Fairytales and Reality =

Studio album by Dionysus
- Released: 15 September 2006
- Genre: Power metal
- Length: 65:54
- Label: AFM
- Producer: Jens Bogren

Dionysus chronology
Anima Mundi (2004)	Fairytales and Reality (2006)	Keep the Spirit (2008)

Professional ratings
Review scores
Source	Rating
Metal Reviews	78/100
Metal Storm	5.8/10
Rock Hard	6.5/10

Fairytales and Reality is the third and final studio album from Swedish/German power metal band Dionysus, released on 15 September 2006.

== Track listing ==
1. "Illusion of Life" – 5:01
2. "The Orb" – 5:00
3. "Blinded" – 4:42
4. "The World" – 3:20
5. "Spirit" – 5:33
6. "Queen of Madness" – 3:43
7. "The Game" – 6:05
8. "True at Heart" – 4:47
9. "Tides Will Turn" – 5:22
10. "Dreamchaser" – 4:46
11. "The End" – 7:59
12. "Time Will Tell" (demo, bonus track) – 5:16
13. "Bringer of Salvation" (demo, bonus track) – 4:22

== Personnel ==
- Olaf Hayer – vocals
- Johnny Öhlin – guitar
- Nobby Noberg – bass
- Ronny Milianowicz – drums
- Kaspar Daklqvist – keyboards

== Credits ==
- Cover art – Derek Gores
