= Symphonity =

Czech power metal band

Symphonity is a Czech power metal band.

The band was founded as Nemesis, changing its name to Symphonity in 2006. All releases as Symphonity have been on Limb Music.

The band has featured members such as vocalist Olaf Hayer and drummer Marthus.

== Discography ==
=== As Nemesis ===
- Goddess of Revenge (2003, Underground Symphony)

=== As Symphonity ===
- Voice from the Silence (2008, Limb Music)
- King of Persia (2016, Limb Music)
- Marco Polo: The Metal Soundtrack (2022, Limb Music)
- Marco Polo: Live in Europe (live album, 2024, Limb Music)
- Beyond Olympus (EP, 2025, Limb Music)
