= The Screaming of the Valkyries =

Studio album by Cradle of Filth
- Released: 21 March 2025
- Recorded: May 2023–July 2024
- Studio: Grindstone (Suffolk)
- Genre: Extreme metal
- Length: 56:13
- Label: Napalm
- Producer: Scott Atkins

Cradle of Filth chronology
Trouble and Their Double Lives (2023)	The Screaming of the Valkyries (2025)

Singles from The Screaming of the Valkyries
- 1. "Malignant Perfection" Released: 22 October 2024; 2. "To Live Deliciously" Released: 20 February 2025; 3. "White Hellebore" Released: 11 March 2025

The Screaming of the Valkyries is the fourteenth studio album by English extreme metal band Cradle of Filth. It was released on 21 March 2025 via Napalm Records. This is the first album with new guitarist Donny Burbage, the final album to feature guitarist Marek "Ashok" Šmerda, and the only studio album to feature Zoe Marie Federoff on keyboards and female vocals.

== Track listing ==
All lyrics are written by Dani Filth; all music is composed by Cradle of Filth.

No.	Title	Length
1.	"To Live Deliciously"	5:32
2.	"Demagoguery"	6:16
3.	"The Trinity of Shadows"	6:22
4.	"Non Omnis Moriar"	5:05
5.	"White Hellebore"	5:04
6.	"You Are My Nautilus"	7:39
7.	"Malignant Perfection"	6:45
8.	"Ex Sanguine Draculae"	7:09
9.	"When Misery Was a Stranger"	6:21
Total length:		56:13

== Personnel ==
=== Cradle of Filth ===
- Dani Filth – lead vocals
- Ashok – guitars
- Donny Burbage – guitars
- Daniel Firth – bass
- Zoe Marie Federoff – keyboards, female vocals
- Marthus – drums

=== Additional contributors ===
- Scott Atkins – production, recording, mixing, mastering
- Sam Wale – keyboards, synthesizers, programming
- Roberto Diaz – artwork
- Dan Goldsworthy – graphic design, layout
- Jakub Aleksandrowicz – photography
- Michaela Hanusova – make-up
- Sara Pajmova – make-up
- Standa Palat – make-up
- Missy Munster – costuming
- Vivamorta – headdress

== Charts ==
Chart performance for The Screaming of the Valkyries
Chart (2025)	Peak position
Austrian Albums (Ö3 Austria)	4
Belgian Albums (Ultratop Flanders)	49
Belgian Albums (Ultratop Wallonia)	37
Croatian International Albums (HDU)	8
Finnish Albums (Suomen virallinen lista)	29
French Albums (SNEP)	104
German Albums (Offizielle Top 100)	5
Scottish Albums (Official Charts)	21
Swiss Albums (Schweizer Hitparade)	17
UK Albums Sales (OCC)	15
UK Independent Albums (Official Charts)	8
UK Rock & Metal Albums (Official Charts)	1
US Top Album Sales (Billboard)	32
