= Dionysus (band) =

Swedish/German power metal band

Background information
- Origin: Sweden
- Genres: Power metal
- Years active: 1999–2008
- Label: AFM
- Members: Olaf Hayer; Johnny Öhlin; Nobby Noberg; Johannes Berg; Joakim Floke
- Past members: Ronny Milianowicz; Kaspar Dahlqvist
- Website: dionysus-powermetal.com

Dionysus was a Swedish/German power metal band formed in 1999 by Sinergy drummer Ronny Milianowicz and Luca Turilli band vocalist Olaf Hayer. The band recorded and released their debut album, Sign of Truth, in 2002, which is best known for its production work by Tobias Sammet of Edguy and Avantasia. They would then record their second album, Anima Mundi ("the soul of the world" in Latin), released in 2004. After one more album, Fairytales and Reality (2006), they disbanded in 2008.

== Members ==
=== Last lineup ===
- Olaf Hayer – vocals
- Johnny Öhlin – guitars
- Nobby Noberg – bass
- Johannes Berg – drums
- Joakim Floke – keyboards

=== Former members ===
- Ronny Milianowicz – drums
- Kaspar Dahlqvist – keyboards

== Discography ==
- Sign of Truth (2002)
- Anima Mundi (2004)
- Fairytales and Reality (2006)

=== Compilations ===
- Keep the Spirit (2008)
