= Olaf Hayer =

German singer

- Genres: Power metal, heavy metal
- Occupation: Singer

Olaf Hayer (born 1968) is a German singer known for his work with the power metal bands Dionysus, Luca Turilli, Magic Kingdom and Symphonity.

== Career ==
Hayer began his career with Lord Byron in 1993, recording a demo in 1995 and the album "Fly free" in 2000. Until 2006, Hayer became part of Luca Turilli's band alongside singer Alessandro Conti (member of Trick or Treat). Turilli was famous as part of Rhapsody of Fire.

Later on he joined Dionysus, a Swedish power metal band with which he recorded three full-length albums. He became frontman of the band.

In 2008, he was part of Symphonity, a power metal band from the Czech Republic for their album Voice from the Silence (2008) and King of Persia (2016). He is a widower and has two children.

== Discography ==
Treasure Seeker

- A Tribute to the Past (1998)

Lord Byron

- Fly Free (2000)

Dionysus

- Sign of Truth (2002)
- Anima Mundi (2004)
- Fairytales and Reality (2006)
- Keep the Spirit (2008) – Compilation

Luca Turilli

- King of the Nordic Twilight (1999)
- Prophet of the Last Eclipse (2002)
- The Infinite Wonders of Creation (2006)

Magic Kingdom

- Symphony of War (2010)

Symphonity

- Voice from the Silence (2008)
- King of Persia (2016)

== Guest appearances ==
- With Aina:
  - Days of Rising Doom – vocals on "The Siege of Aina"

Marius Danielsen's Legend of Valley Doom: Princess Lariana's Forest song on Part 2 as well as Sarlinian Bow and For Our King and Our Land songs on Part 3.

Eunomia Part 2: My Heart

Memorized Dreams: Gates of Heaven
