= Cryptoriana – The Seductiveness of Decay =

Studio album by Cradle of Filth
- Released: 22 September 2017
- Recorded: December 2016 – April 2017
- Studios: Grindstone Studios (Suffolk, England)
- Genre: Extreme metal
- Length: 52:53
- Label: Nuclear Blast
- Producer: Scott Atkins

Cradle of Filth chronology
Hammer of the Witches (2015)	Cryptoriana – The Seductiveness of Decay (2017)	Existence Is Futile (2021)

Singles from Cryptoriana – The Seductiveness of Decay
- 1. "Heartbreak and Seance" Released: 11 July 2017; 2. "You Will Know the Lion by His Claw" Released: 8 August 2017; 3. "Achingly Beautiful" Released: 15 September 2017

Professional ratings
Aggregate scores
Source	Rating
Metacritic	77/100
Review scores
Source	Rating
AllMusic	3.5/5 stars

Cryptoriana – The Seductiveness of Decay is the twelfth studio album by English extreme metal band Cradle of Filth. It was released on 22 September 2017 through Nuclear Blast Records. It is the second and final album to feature Lindsay Schoolcraft on narration before her departure in February 2020.

== Background and promotion ==
Dani Filth said the album "is deeply infused with Victorian gothic horror and thus the title is a reflection of that. 'Cryptoriana' implies the Victorians' infatuation with the supernatural, the grave and the ghoulish. And the subtitle, 'The Seductiveness of Decay', further cements this attraction to death and the glittering lengthy process of self-annihilation".

The first promotional single, "Heartbreak and Seance", premiered alongside an accompanying music video on 11 July 2017.

The second single, "You Will Know the Lion by His Claw", premiered together with a lyric music video on 8 August 2017.

The third single, "Achingly Beautiful", was also released in conjunction with a lyric video on 15 September. Vocalist Dani Filth stated the single "has a very old-school Cradle vibe" and compared it to the song "A Gothic Romance" from the album Dusk and Her Embrace.

== Track listing ==
No.	Title	Length
1.	"Exquisite Torments Await..."	2:15
2.	"Heartbreak and Seance"	6:24
3.	"Achingly Beautiful"	7:02
4.	"Wester Vespertine"	7:24
5.	"The Seductiveness of Decay"	7:38
6.	"Vengeful Spirit" (featuring Liv Kristine)	6:00
7.	"You Will Know the Lion by His Claw"	7:22
8.	"Death and the Maiden"	8:48
Total length:		52:53

Digipack, digital and vinyl version
No.	Title	Length
9.	"The Night at Catafalque Manor"	7:31
10.	"Alison Hell" (Annihilator cover)	5:01
Total length:		65:25

== Personnel ==
All information from the album booklet.

Cradle of Filth

- Dani Filth – lead vocals
- Richard Shaw – guitars
- Ashok – guitars
- Daniel Firth – bass
- Marthus – drums, keyboards, orchestration, choir vocals, score arrangements, choir and soprano arrangements
- Lindsay Schoolcraft – narration

Additional musicians

- Liv Kristine – vocals on "Vengeful Spirit"
- Linda Nepivodova – choir and alto vocals
- Lucie Korinkova – choir, alto and soprano vocals
- Petr Janovsky – choir and bass vocals
- Vit Starka – choir and bass vocals
- Miloš Makovský – choir vocals
- Martin Franze – choir and baritone vocals, artistic leader
- Dana Toncrová – choir and soprano vocals
- Ivan Nepivoda – choir and tenor vocals
- Jakub Herzan – choir and tenor vocals

Production

- Scott Atkins – production, engineering, mixing, mastering
- Roman Jez – engineering
- Igor Mores – engineering
- Chris Schäfer – engineering
- Arthur Berzinsh – artwork
- Dani Filth – lyrics
- Dan Goldsworthy – layout
- Flame Hel – photography

== Charts ==
Chart (2017)	Peak position
Australian Albums (ARIA)	53
Austrian Albums (Ö3 Austria)	20
Belgian Albums (Ultratop Flanders)	35
Belgian Albums (Ultratop Wallonia)	42
Czech Albums (ČNS IFPI)	17
Dutch Albums (Album Top 100)	111
Finnish Albums (Suomen virallinen lista)	8
French Albums (SNEP)	110
German Albums (Offizielle Top 100)	15
Hungarian Albums (MAHASZ)	32
Scottish Albums (Official Charts)	31
Swiss Albums (Schweizer Hitparade)	24
UK Albums (Official Charts)	50
US Independent Albums (Billboard)	14
US Top Hard Rock Albums (Billboard)	15
