= The Infinite Wonders of Creation =

Studio album by Luca Turilli
- Released: 26 May 2006
- Recorded: Gate Studio, Wolfsburg, Germany, September–November 2005
- Genre: Symphonic power metal
- Length: 50:41
- Label: Magic Circle Music/SPV
- Producer: Luca Turilli, Sascha Paeth, Joey DeMaio

Luca Turilli chronology
Prophet of the Last Eclipse (2002)	The Infinite Wonders of Creation (2006)

The Infinite Wonders of Creation is the third and final studio album by the Italian musician Luca Turilli. The album was released in Europe on 26 May 2006 and was later released in USA on 6 June 2006 by Magic Circle Music.

A limited version of the album was released and contains a piano version of the song "Altitudes" and a single CD with the Luca Turilli's Dreamquest song "Virus" (The single CD also includes a remix of "Virus", along with the tracks "Too Late" and "Sospiro Divino".) This album is notable for the addition of much more use of a female voice done by Bridget Fogle, and for being the only Luca Turilli album with Turilli on keyboards. The male voices were done, as on all of his earlier albums, by Olaf Hayer.

== Track listing ==
All lyrics are written by Luca Turilli; all music is composed by Luca Turilli.

No.	Title	Length
1.	"Secrets of the Forgotten Ages"	3:12
2.	"Mother Nature"	4:39
3.	"Angels of the Winter Dawn"	4:16
4.	"Altitudes"	4:37
5.	"The Miracle of Life"	4:24
6.	"Silver Moon"	5:37
7.	"Cosmic Revelation"	4:48
8.	"Pyramids and Stargates"	6:07
9.	"Mystic and Divine"	4:21
10.	"The Infinite Wonders of Creation"	8:40
Total length:		50:41

Limited edition
No.	Title	Length
11.	"Altitudes" (Piano Version)	3:20
Total length:		54:01

== Lineup ==
- Bridget Fogle – female lead vocals
- Olaf Hayer – male lead vocals
- Luca Turilli – guitars, keyboards, composer
- Sascha Paeth – bass
- Robert Hunecke-Rizzo – drums

== Charts ==
Chart (2006)	Peak position
French Albums (SNEP)	138
German Albums (Offizielle Top 100)	100
