= Anima Mundi (album) =

Studio album by Dionysus
- Released: 26 January 2004
- Studios: Studio Kuling, Örebro, Sweden
- Genres: Heavy metal, power metal
- Length: 53:26
- Label: AFM
- Producer: Jens Bogren

Dionysus chronology
| Sign of Truth (2002) | Anima Mundi (2004) | Fairytales and Reality (2006) |

Professional ratings
Review scores
| Source | Rating |
|---|---|
| AllMusic | 3/5 |
| Rock Hard | 7/10 |
| Scream Magazine | 5/6 |

Anima Mundi is the second album by the German/Swedish power metal band Dionysus, released on 26 January 2004.

== Track listing ==
1. "Divine" – 4:10
2. "Bringer Of War" – 5:06
3. "Anima Mundi" – 3:34
4. "My Heart Is Crying" – 5:02
5. "March For Freedom" – 6:05
6. "What" – 5:17
7. "Eyes Of The World" – 5:39
8. "Forever More" – 4:54
9. "Paradise Land" – 4:51
- Bonus Track

10. "Closer To The Sun" – 3:18

- 2001 Pre-Production Bonus Tracks

11. "Holy War" – 5:30
12. "Pouring Rain" – 4:50
13. "Key Into The Past" – 5:17

== Personnel ==
- Olaf Hayer – vocals
- Johnny Öhlin – guitar
- Nobby Noberg – bass
- Ronny Milianowicz – drums
- Kaspar Dahlqvist – keyboards

== Credits ==
- Cover art - Derek Gores
