= Martin "Marthus" Škaroupka =

Czech extreme metal drummer (born 1981)

Marthus
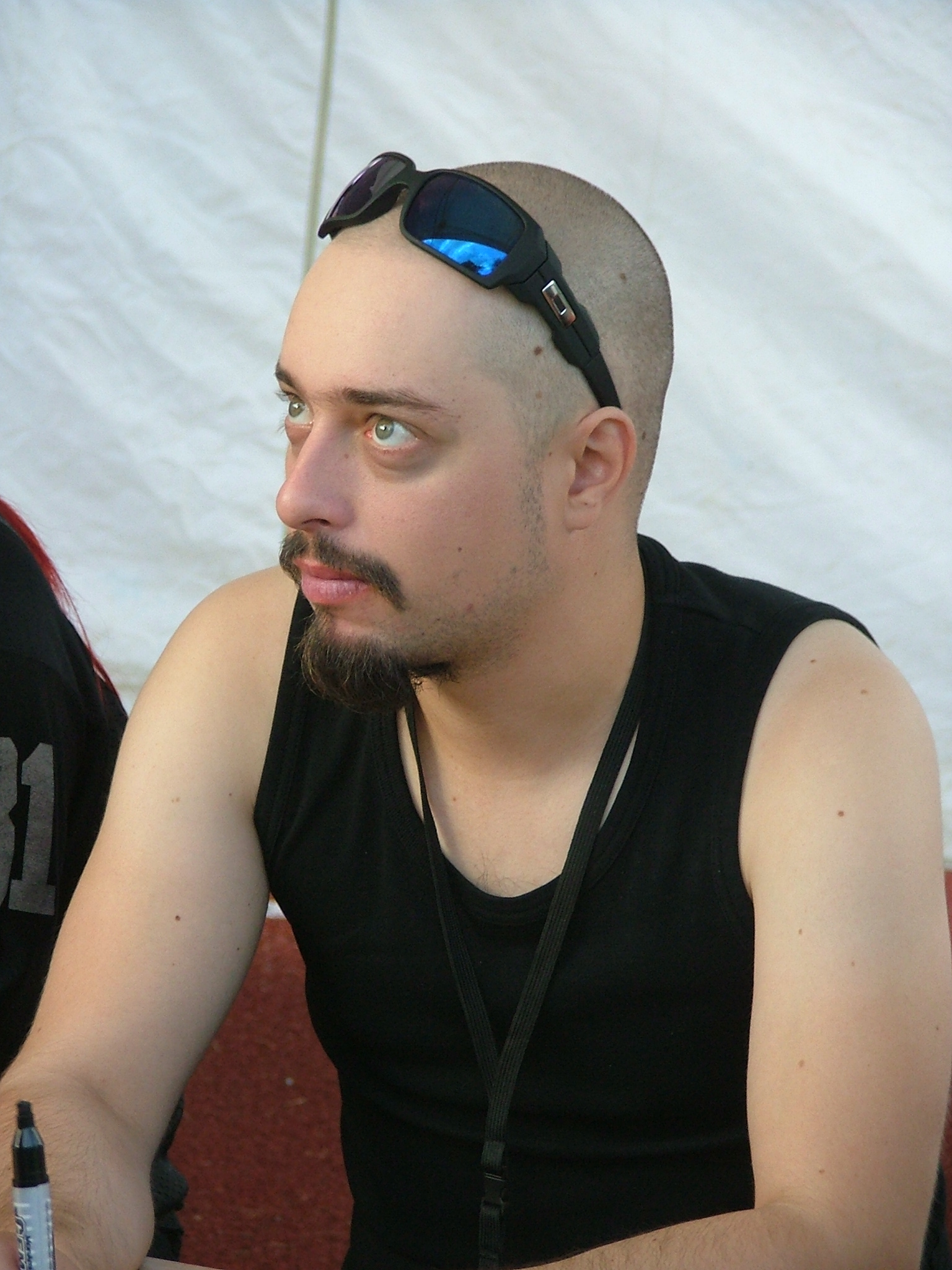
- Škaroupka at Kuopiorock 2008

Background information
- Born: Martin Škaroupka; 20 January 1981 (age 45)
- Origin: Brno, Czech Republic
- Genres: Extreme metal; heavy metal; black metal; progressive metal; hard rock
- Occupations: Musician; songwriter
- Instruments: Drums; keyboards
- Years active: 1996–present
- Member of: Cradle of Filth; Inner Fear; Lunatic Gods; Mantas
- Formerly of: Masterplan; Titanic; Symphonity; Entrails
- Website: marthusmusic.com

Martin "Marthus" Škaroupka (born 20 January 1981) is a Czech drummer, best known as a member of the British extreme metal band Cradle of Filth. He is also a songwriter and keyboard player, having written and recorded all the keyboards and orchestrations for the Cradle of Filth albums The Manticore and Other Horrors, Hammer of the Witches, Cryptoriana – The Seductiveness of Decay and most of the keyboards and orchestrations for Existence Is Futile. He wrote the music for songs such as "Right Wing of the Garden Triptych" or "Crawling King Chaos".

== Biography ==
When he was six, Škaroupka started attending piano and singing lessons at LŠU Brno until he was 13. Because there were no drums lessons at any of the music schools of that time available, he began to take private lessons from prof. Cupák (member of Janáček opera in Brno).

When he was 15 years old, Škaroupka was admitted to Leoš Janáček Conservatory Brno, where he graduated in drums and piano.

Marthus began playing with various bands of various music styles when he was 15. In the same year, his first studio enterprise is released with the band Animal Farm, which was followed by another studio CD with the band Pink Chubby Cigar.

In 1997, Marthus and his long-time friend Khaablus founded the band Inner Fear, where Marthus was responsible for all compositions, keyboards and drums. In the same year, the first demo came out, and by 2003 two more mini-CDs and three full-length albums were produced (out of which the first was never released officially).

Also in 1997, Marthus filled in as touring drummer for Czech bands Monastery, Pluggulp, Inner Fear, Happy Death and Scharnhorst.

In the years following (1997–2000), Marthus played live not only with Happy Death and Inner Fear, but also appeared as a guest drummer on Melancholy Pessimism mini-tour (2000), a project of Root singer Jiří "Big Boss" Valter, BigBoss and in 1999 recording CD of project Entrails (where he met Root guitar player, Petr "Blackie" Hošek).

In the beginning of 2001, Marthus took played drums in Pandemia, setting out on a spring European tour, after which he left the band.

In summer 2004, Marthus filmed his first drumming DVD and moved from Czech Republic to England.

In autumn 2004, Marthus joined English band Mantas (featuring Venom guitarist Jeff "Mantas" Dunn) and in summer 2005 started collaborating with Czech power/speed/symphonic metal band Symphonity (ex Nemesis).

In January 2006, Marthus recorded drums for a new Symphonity album at House of Audio studios in Germany.

In October 2006, Marthus joined English extreme metal band Cradle of Filth, replacing Adrian Erlandsson.

In July 2012, it was announced that Marthus would join melodic power metal band Masterplan.

== Discography ==
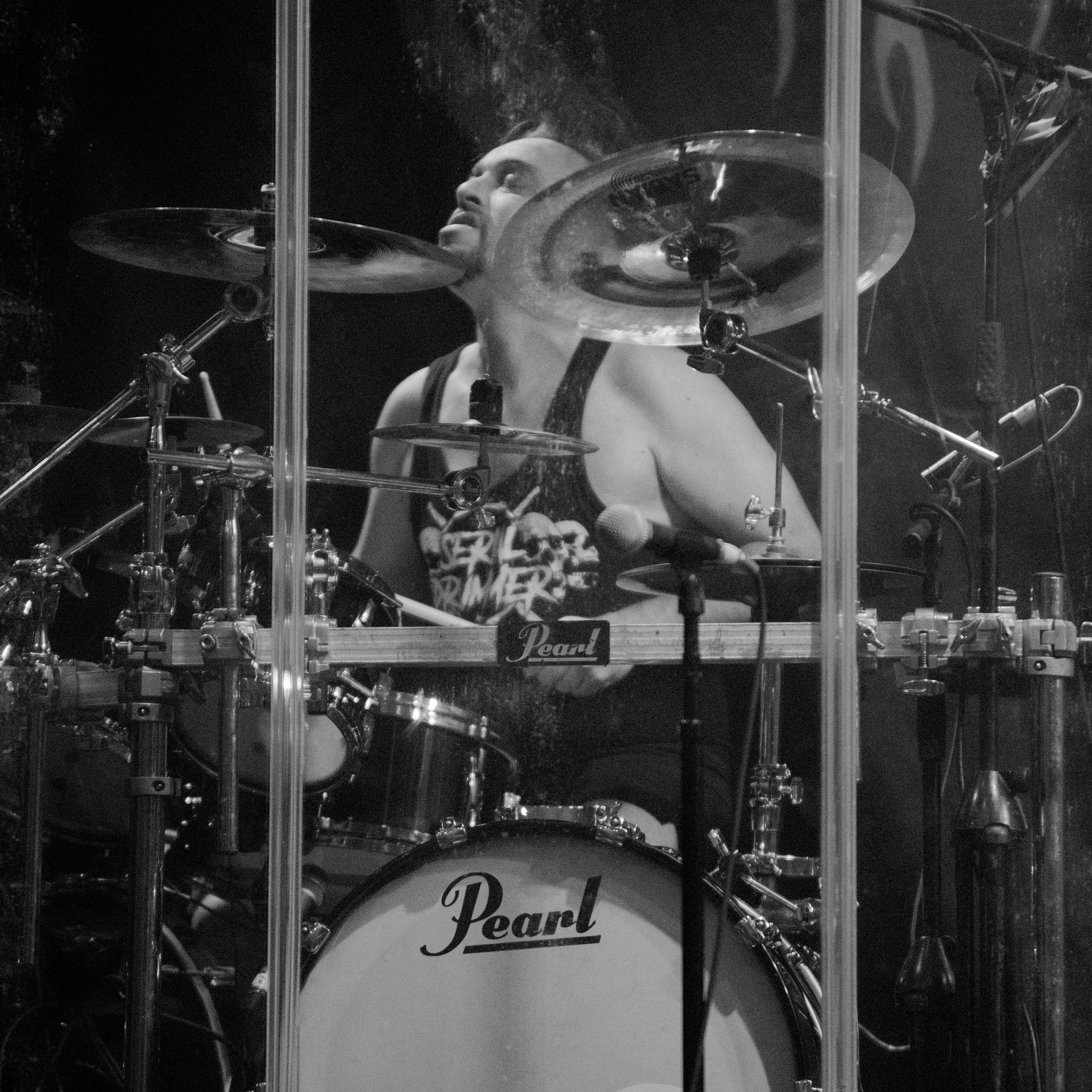
Marthus performing with Cradle of Filth in 2021

Year	Title	Band
1996	Animal Farm	Animal Farm
1996	Pink Chubby Cigar	Pink Chubby Cigar
1997	Defenders of the Law	Scharnhorst
1997	Pilgrims of Paradise	Pluggulp
1997	Delusive Eyes	Inner Fear
1997	New Hi-Tech	Happy Death
1999	Altering the Technology	Happy Death
1999	Face of Inner Apocalypsa	Inner Fear
1999	Black Vein	Entrails
1999	Serpent Seed	Entrails
2000	Tribute to Master's Hammer	Entrails
2000	Akhu	Inner Fear
2001	Odeum of Silence	Inner Fear
2002	Thanalogy	Inner Fear
2003	Symbiotry	Inner Fear
2004	Lost Man	Galactic Industry
2008	Voice from the Silence	Symphonity
2008	Godspeed on the Devil's Thunder	Cradle of Filth
2010	Darkly, Darkly, Venus Aversa	Cradle of Filth
2011	Evermore Darkly	Cradle of Filth
2012	First Born Fear	Inner Fear
2012	Metal Celebration Live 2011 DVD	Titanic
2012	The Manticore and Other Horrors	Cradle of Filth
2013	Best of Fuck Off!!!	Kryptor
2013	Double Time	Titanic
2013	Novum Initium	Masterplan
2015	Dark Chambers of Déjà Vu	Sebastien
2015	Keep Your Dream aLive	Masterplan
2015	Hammer of the Witches	Cradle of Filth
2016	Metalovej Svátek Živě/Live 2015	Titanic
2016	King Of Persia	Symphonity
2017	Cryptoriana – The Seductiveness of Decay	Cradle Of Filth
2018	Turiec	Lunatic Gods
2018	Soumrak Titanu	Titanic
2019	Zoigl	Pacess
2020	Soumrak Titanu Zive	Titanic
2021	On	Titanic
2021	Existence Is Futile	Cradle Of Filth
2022	Cäzilia	Inner Fear
2023	Double Time (10th Anniversary)	Titanic
2023	Trouble And Their Double Lives	Cradle Of Filth
2023	Vresovrenie	Lunatic Gods
2023	Live in Brno 2022 (Absolutno MC)	Pacess
2024	Vzkriseni	Dogma Art
2025	The Screaming of the Valkyries	Cradle of Filth
2025	Beyond Olympus	Symphonity
2026	Katechi2mus	Pacess & Bara Basikova (producer & written and recorded all the keyboards)
2026	At The Spiral's End	Hexenhaus
2027	FOLKLŌRSKA	Lunatic Gods
