= Magic Kingdom (band) =

Belgian power metal band

- Origin: Brussels, Belgium
- Genres: Power metal, symphonic metal
- Years active: 1998–present
- Labels: Music Avenue, Limb, AFM
- Members: Dushan Petrossi; Vassili Moltchanov; Michael Vescera; Gabriel Deschamps
- Past members: Christoph Hofbouer; Max Leclercq; Frederik Donche; Aymeric Ribot; Anton Arkhipov; Olaf Hayer; Philippe Giordana; Freddy Ortscheid

Magic Kingdom is a Belgian power metal band formed in 1998 by guitarist Dushan Petrossi.

== Discography ==
- The Arrival (1999)
- Metallic Tragedy (2004)
- Symphony of War (2010)
- Savage Requiem (2015)
- MetAlmighty (2019)
- Blaze of Rage (2024)
