= Arthur Berzinsh =

Latvian artist

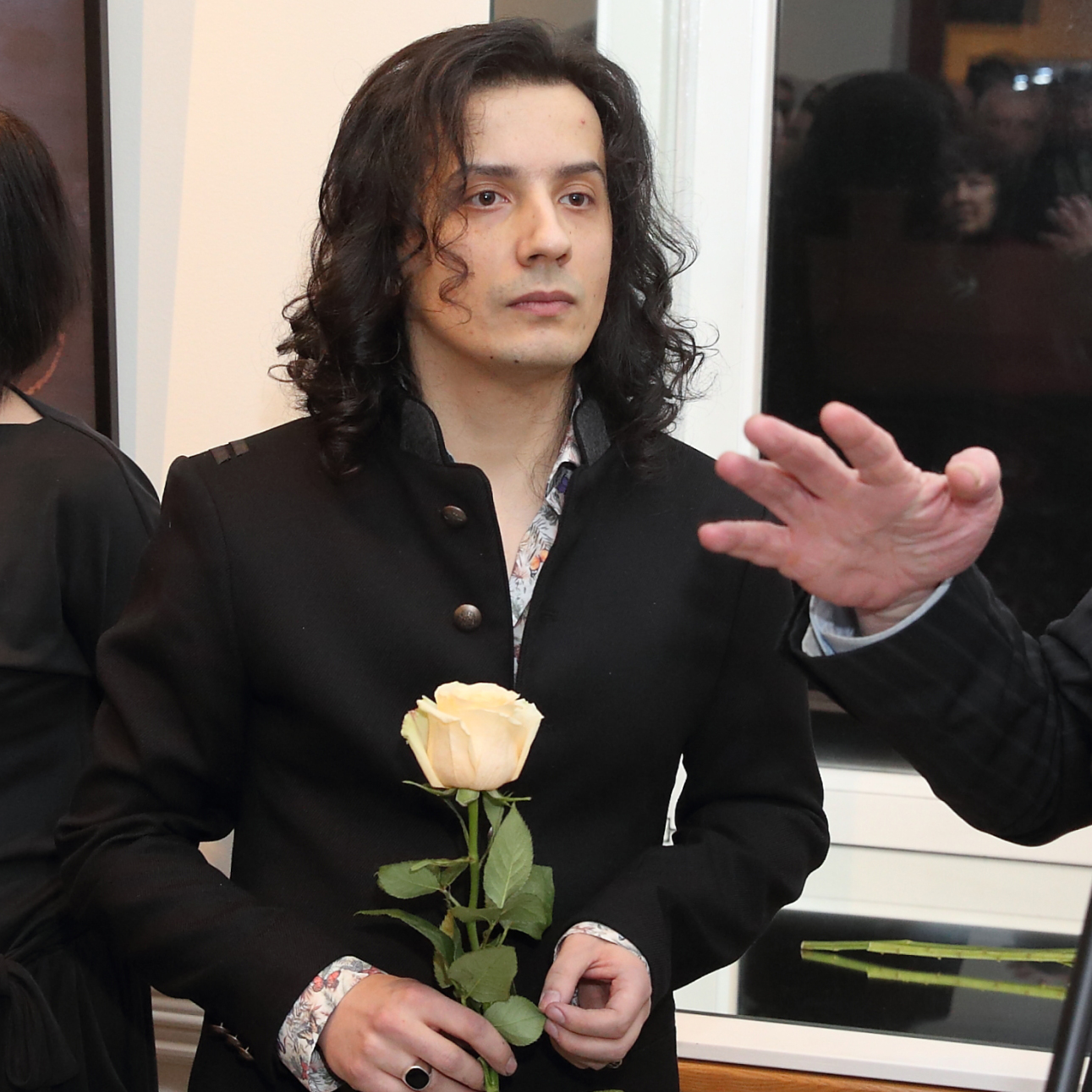
- Arthur Berzinsh at the exhibition

Arthur Berzinsh (Latvian: Artūrs Bērziņš) is a Latvian contemporary artist, painter, video artist and musician. He is best known for his neo-symbolist digital art, paintings and cover art for various books and music albums.

== Biography ==
Arthur Berzinsh was born on April 20, 1983, in Riga, Latvia. In 2005, he entered the Latvian Academy of Arts, Visual Communication Department, where he obtained a bachelor's degree in 2009 and master's degree in 2012. In 2010, the website Weirdworm.com included him in its Top 10 of World's Weird Art of last 100 years.

In 2011 he became a member of the Latvian Artists' Union.

Since 2001, Berzinsh has participated in more than 50 exhibitions. In 2014, his painting Milk was included in the art collection of Luciano Benetton, "Imago Mundi".

== Solo exhibitions ==
- 2014 "National Post-romanticism" (Gallery "Bastejs", Alksnaja 7, Riga Latvia).
- 2012 "Forgotten Dream Shop" (Gertrudes 110, Riga Latvia).
- 2011 "Biopunk" (Happy Art Museum, Galleria Riga, Riga, Latvia).
- 2010 "Inside Entrails" (gallery "Pegazs", Riga, Latvia).
- 2009 "Coca-ine from LV" (gallery "Pegazs", Riga, Latvia).

== Illustrator ==
Since 1998, Berzinsh illustrated several music CD covers. In 2015, he made the artwork for Hammer of the Witches album by the English extreme metal band Cradle of Filth. Berzinsh created book covers for several authors and Latvian editions of Stephen King, Neil Gaiman, Terry Pratchett, Ursula K. Le Guin, Patrick Rothfuss, Gregory David Roberts and other authors.

== Reception ==
Katrina Teivane-Korpa of Studija wrote: "Berzinsh’ creative work is characterized by a varied range of voluptuous erotica, intensified imagery, dreamlike scenes and decorativeness weighed down by visual metaphors and contrasts teetering on the edge of symbolism, postmodernism with its characteristic plundering of stylistic purity, citations and irony, and highlights the acutely romantic shadings typical of Gothic art."

Berzinsh was criticized for promoting cannibalism after his live-streaming performance of Eschatology.
