= Prophet of the Last Eclipse =

Studio album by Luca Turilli
- Released: November 26, 2002
- Recorded: Gate-Studio, Wolfsburg Germany January to July 2002
- Genre: Symphonic power metal
- Length: 51:22
- Label: Limb Music/SPV
- Producer: Sascha Paeth & Miro

Luca Turilli chronology
| King of the Nordic Twilight (1999) | Prophet of the Last Eclipse (2002) | The Infinite Wonders of Creation (2006) |

Professional ratings
Review scores
| Source | Rating |
|---|---|
| Allmusic | link |

Prophet of the Last Eclipse is the second studio album by the Italian musician Luca Turilli. It was released on November 26, 2002, by Limb Music Productions. The ten tracks tell a story about the world Zaephyr and its destruction. Turilli was inspired to make this album by his love of science fiction films, in particular, Event Horizon. At the end, Turilli mentions that the story is "to be continued", but it is not continued on The Infinite Wonders of Creation.

== Release ==
The song "Demonheart" was released as a single shortly after the album's release. The single features the full song, as well as an edit of one of the songs from Prophet of the Last Eclipse and an edit of one of the songs from King of the Nordic Twilight, two original songs, and a cover of the Helloween track "I'm Alive".

== Track listing ==
All lyrics are written by Luca Turilli; all music is composed by Luca Turilli.

| No. | Title | Length |
|---|---|---|
| 1. | "Aenigma" | 1:58 |
| 2. | "War of the Universe" | 4:18 |
| 3. | "Rider of the Astral Fire" | 5:12 |
| 4. | "Zaephyr Skies' Theme" (Instrumental) | 3:19 |
| 5. | "The Age of Mystic Ice" | 4:53 |
| 6. | "Prince of the Starlight" | 5:13 |
| 7. | "Timeless Oceans" | 4:18 |
| 8. | "Demonheart" | 5:08 |
| 9. | "New Century's Tarantella" | 5:15 |
| 10. | "Prophet of the Last Eclipse" | 11:48 |
| Total length: | | 51:22 |

Limited edition
| No. | Title | Length |
|---|---|---|
| 11. | "Dark Comet's Reign" | 4:44 |
| 12. | "Demonheart" (Vocals by Andre Matos) | 5:02 |
| Total length: | | 61:08 |

Vinyl
| No. | Title | Length |
|---|---|---|
| 13. | "Caprice in A Minor" (Instrumental) | 2:29 |
| 14. | "Autumn's Last Whisper" | 2:37 |
| Total length: | | 66:14 |

== Personnel ==
- Luca Turilli — lead guitars
- Olaf Hayer — lead vocals
- Sascha Paeth — bass guitar
- Miro — keyboards
- Robert Hunecke-Rizzo — drums, rhythm guitars

=== Collaborations ===
- Andre Matos (vocals in the other version of Demonheart)
- Amanda Somerville (vocalizations in Zaephyr Skies' Theme)
- 'Rannveig Sif Sigurðardóttir (vocals in Autumn's Last Whisper)

== Charts ==
| Chart (2002) | Peak position |
|---|---|
| French Albums (SNEP) | 122 |
| German Albums (Offizielle Top 100) | 93 |

=== Singles ===
"Demonheart"
| Chart (2002) | Peak position |
|---|---|
| Italy (FIMI) | 46 |
