= Sign of Truth =

Studio album by Dionysus
- Released: 11 November 2002
- Studios: Röhn Studio, Fulda, Germany
- Genre: Power metal
- Length: 60:07
- Label: AFM
- Producer: Tobias Sammet

Dionysus chronology
Sign of Truth (2002)	Anima Mundi (2004)

Professional ratings
Review scores
Source	Rating
AllMusic	2.5/5
Metal Reviews	84/100
Rock Hard	7/10

Sign of Truth is the first album by Swedish/German power metal band Dionysus. It was recorded at the Röhn Studio in Fulda, Germany, produced by Tobias Sammet of Edguy and Avantasia, and mixed by Tommy Newton (Keeper of the Seven Keys: Parts 1 & 2 by Helloween).

== Track listing ==
1. "Time Will Tell" – 5:05
2. "Sign of Truth" – 5:34
3. "Bringer of Salvation" – 4:35
4. "Pouring Rain" – 5:23
5. "Anthem (for the Children)" – 5:39
6. "Holy War" – 5:27
7. "Don't Forget" – 6:05
8. "Walk on Fire" – 5:58
9. "Never Wait" – 5:50
- Bonus Tracks

10. "Loaded Gun" – 5:12
11. "Key into the Past" (Japanese Bonus) – 5:19

== Personnel ==
- Olaf Hayer – vocals
- Johnny Öhlin – guitar
- Nobby Noberg – bass
- Ronny Milianowicz – drums
- Kaspar Daklqvist – keyboards
