= Vestal Masturbation T-shirt =

1993 band merchandise

The "Vestal Masturbation" T-shirt design.

The Vestal Masturbation T-shirt is a controversial piece of Cradle of Filth band merchandise, which were first printed and distributed in 1993. The front of the shirt features an image of a masturbating, semi-nude nun with the words "Vestal Masturbation" below, and "Jesus is a cunt" written on the shirt's backside. The shirt, released in the early stages of the band’s career, garnered the group some significant attention due to its infamy, and even resulted in the arrests of some fans who wore it in public.

== History ==
The shirt was designed in 1993, during preparations for a tour featuring Cradle of Filth alongside Norwegian band Emperor, and was subsequently sold at the tour's dates. Although the concept of depicting a nun had already been established, the phrase "Jesus Is a Cunt" was added at a later stage. Cradle of Filth frontman Dani Filth has stated that he does not recall who it was in the six-member lineup that proposed the phrase. Filth's wife worked at a T-shirt printing company in Hadleigh, Suffolk, but the company refused to print it. Eventually, they found a printer willing to do it but they were paid cash-in-hand, and the printer gave the band the screens used to print the shirt rather than keep them themselves. Over 25,000 copies of the shirt were sold within the first six years of production.

== Arrests and legal issues ==
In 1994, 18-year-old Paul Timms, a member of black metal band Necropolis, wore the shirt when the band were on trial for damaging seven churches and a graveyard in Kent at an estimated cost of £100,000, in imitation of similar attacks committed by members of the early Norwegian black metal scene. All four members were given 30 month-prison sentences, although due to his age Timms was sent to HM Prison Rochester, a young offender institution.

In 1996, a 29-year-old fan of Cradle of Filth was arrested in London and found guilty of profane representation under the Metropolitan Police Act 1839 for wearing the shirt in public. He was fined £150 (equivalent to £301.09 in 2025).

Cradle of Filth's drummer Nicholas Barker was arrested for wearing the shirt in May 1997 while the band were waiting to take a ferry from England to perform in the Netherlands. He was released after two hours without charge and was able to make the performance.

In November 1997, a 24-year-old record store clerk in Ocala, Florida was arrested by police for wearing the shirt in a shopping mall. A jury acquitted him of all charges.

In 2001, Alex Mosson, Lord Provost of Glasgow, campaigned for the shirt to be removed from Glasgow's branch of Tower Records. The shop was raided twice by police, but the owners of the shop argued that they were not acting illegally, and later sold all of their stock of the shirt partly due to local media coverage. The shop eventually stopped selling the shirt.

On Halloween 2004, a person in Norwich was arrested for wearing the shirt in public. He pleaded guilty to "religiously aggravated offensive conduct". He was fined £150 (equivalent to £270.72 in 2025) and the judge at the trial ordered for the shirt to be destroyed.

In 2005, 19-year-old Adam Shepherd from Weymouth, Dorset was arrested for wearing the shirt under the recently created anti-hate laws which banned the public display of religiously insulting signs. He pleaded guilty, was sentenced to 80 hours community service, and was ordered to pay court costs of £40 (equivalent to £70.74 in 2025). Dani Filth publicly criticised the arrest.

In November 2007, Electric Cabaret in Edinburgh was raided by an undercover police officer for selling the shirt, and the owner was charged with selling obscene material aggravated by religious prejudice. He defended himself saying that he only ordered the shirt because teenage customers ordered it. The charges were dropped.

In 2008, a teenager in Gold Coast, Queensland, Australia was arrested for wearing the shirt and charged with offensive behaviour. In July 2008, the shirt was officially banned in New Zealand; however, this ban was downgraded in 2020 so the shirt could be sold to people over 18. In 2015, the shirt was part of a display at Canterbury Museum, Christchurch. In protest against the display, a woman attempted to obscure the shirt by spraying it with black paint. The shirt was undamaged as it was behind a perspex barrier, which was later cleaned.
