= Hammer of the Witches =

Studio album by Cradle of Filth
- Released: 10 July 2015
- Recorded: November 2014 – May 2015
- Studio: Grindstone Studios (Suffolk, England)
- Genre: Extreme metal
- Length: 56:11; 68:47 (Deluxe edition)
- Label: Nuclear Blast
- Producer: Scott Atkins

Cradle of Filth chronology
The Manticore and Other Horrors (2012)	Hammer of the Witches (2015)	Cryptoriana – The Seductiveness of Decay (2017)

Singles from Hammer of the Witches
- 1. "Right Wing of the Garden Triptych" Released: 13 May 2015; 2. "Blackest Magick in Practice" Released: 4 December 2015

Hammer of the Witches is the eleventh studio album by English extreme metal band Cradle of Filth. It was released on 10 July 2015 and is their first release under record label Nuclear Blast. Hammer of the Witches features the band's new line-up following the departure of Paul Allender and James McIlroy, which includes new guitarists Marek 'Ashok' Šmerda and Richard Shaw and new keyboardist and female vocalist Lindsay Schoolcraft.

== Background ==
Hammer of the Witches is the first Cradle of Filth album since 1998's Cruelty and the Beast to not feature work from longtime guitarist Paul Allender. Work on the album began in early 2014, with frontman Dani emphasizing that the band planned on taking their time with it. In an interview in 2016, Lindsay Schoolcraft stated that she was pleased with the fan-response and that the band had actually finished work on the album quicker than they had expected to.

== Cover art ==
Vocalist Dani Filth stated: "The artwork for Hammer of the Witches was created by Latvian artist Arthur Berzinsh and is a lavish walk-through of the lyricism, drawing on rich renaissance themes and displaying them in beautiful-yet-unsettling scenarios. Half of the detailed pieces are totally original for the release, others are Berzinsh classics cunningly tailored to the themes of the album, which are themes rife with heady witchcraft, be it persecution, retribution or unfettered spiritual liberation. The female form is rampant throughout the artwork, unashamedly displayed in its classical rendition of beauty... and horror."

== Release ==
The first single and video for the track "Right Wing of the Garden Triptych" was released on 14 May 2015. Hammer of the Witches was released on 10 July.

== Reception ==
Professional ratings
Aggregate scores
Source	Rating
Metacritic	75/100
Review scores
Source	Rating
AllMusic	3.5/5 stars
Consequence of Sound	B−
The Guardian	4/5 stars
Kerrang!	4/5 stars
MetalSucks	4/5 stars
Record Collector	3/5 stars
Sputnikmusic	4/5 stars

Hammer of the Witches has received a favourable response from critics, who appreciated its change in direction. It has also received a more positive fan response than previous releases in recent years such as The Manticore and Other Horrors and Darkly, Darkly, Venus Aversa, with many praising it as the band's best album since Cruelty and the Beast (1998). The Guardian called it "both a joyous nod towards past glories and a significant creative rebirth" and wrote "these are the most vital and incisive songs Dani Filth has conjured from the dark ether in a long time". AllMusic wrote "on their 11th studio album, this unholy horde, forever wrapped in corpse paint, leather, and spikes, look back more than they do forward. And that proves a good thing [...] Hammer of the Witches doesn't reach the heights of Dusk of Her Embrace [sic], but it does offer proof that there is plenty of fire and creativity left in Cradle of Filth."

== Track listing ==
All lyrics are written by Dani Filth; all music is composed by Cradle of Filth (Dani Filth, Martin Škaroupka, Daniel Firth, Lindsay Schoolcraft, Richard Shaw, Marek 'Ashok' Šmerda).

No.	Title	Length
1.	"Walpurgis Eve"	1:29
2.	"Yours Immortally..."	6:01
3.	"Enshrined in Crematoria"	5:46
4.	"Deflowering the Maidenhead, Displeasuring the Goddess"	6:56
5.	"Blackest Magick in Practice"	6:50
6.	"The Monstrous Sabbat (Summoning the Coven)"	1:51
7.	"Hammer of the Witches"	6:29
8.	"Right Wing of the Garden Triptych"	5:54
9.	"The Vampyre at My Side"	5:45
10.	"Onward Christian Soldiers"	6:59
11.	"Blooding the Hounds of Hell"	2:10
Total length:		56:11

Deluxe edition
No.	Title	Length
12.	"King of the Woods"	6:17
13.	"Misericord"	6:19
Total length:		68:47

== Personnel ==
Credits for Hammer of the Witches adapted from liner notes.

Cradle of Filth

- Dani Filth – lead vocals
- Richard Shaw – guitars
- Ashok – guitars
- Daniel Firth – bass
- Marthus – drums, keyboards, orchestrations, score, arrangements
- Lindsay Schoolcraft – female vocals, harp

Additional musicians

- Alexey Aslamas – violin
- Dalibor Strunc – cimbalom

Production

- Scott Atkins – production, engineering, mixing, mastering
- Artūrs Bērziņš – cover art, artwork
- Toni Davey – design
- Dani Filth – lyrics
- Rob Kimura – layout
- Miloš Makovský – conductor
- Sam Scott-Hunter – photography

== Charts ==
Chart (2015)	Peak position
Australian Albums (ARIA)	28
Austrian Albums (Ö3 Austria)	57
Czech Albums (ČNS IFPI)	5
Belgian Albums (Ultratop Flanders)	28
Belgian Albums (Ultratop Wallonia)	31
Dutch Albums (Album Top 100)	38
Finnish Albums (Suomen virallinen lista)	5
Hungarian Albums (MAHASZ)	21
Italian Albums (FIMI)	68
Scottish Albums (Official Charts)	48
Swiss Albums (Schweizer Hitparade)	46
UK Albums (Official Charts)	44
UK Independent Albums (Official Charts)	4
UK Rock & Metal Albums (Official Charts)	2
US Billboard 200	196
US Top Album Sales (Billboard)	76
US Top Rock Albums (Billboard)	20
US Top Hard Rock Albums (Billboard)	4
US Independent Albums (Billboard)	9
