= The Manticore and Other Horrors =

Studio album by Cradle of Filth
- Released: 29 October 2012
- Recorded: April – June 2012
- Studios: Grindstone Studios (Suffolk, England), Springvale Studios (Ipswich, Suffolk, England)
- Genre: Extreme metal
- Length: 51:37
- Labels: Peaceville (Europe); Nuclear Blast (US)
- Producers: Scott Atkins; Daniel Lloyd Davey; Paul Allender; Martin Škaroupka

Cradle of Filth chronology
Midnight in the Labyrinth (2012)	The Manticore and Other Horrors (2012)	Hammer of the Witches (2015)

Singles from The Manticore and Other Horrors
- 1. "Frost on Her Pillow" Released: 19 October 2012; 2. "For Your Vulgar Delectation" Released: 21 June 2013

The Manticore and Other Horrors is the tenth studio album by English extreme metal band Cradle of Filth. It was released on 29 October 2012 in Europe and on 30 October in US. It is the band's only album as a three-man group rather than its six-man staple. It was also the last release with Paul Allender on guitar, who departed the band for a second time in April 2014.

== Background ==
Guitarist Paul Allender told Ultimate Guitar that "The last thing we want to do is come out with another album that sounds like the last two. We decided to change direction and go back to what we used to do with the female vocals; all the strong melody lines and harmonies... I've put a lot of punk orientated riffs back into it again. It's really gone quite dark and pretty hardcore."

A press release in August 2012 revealed that the album was conceived as "a bestiary, a collection of stories on monsters," including "personal demons, chimeras, literary fiends, and world-enslaving entities..." The title track, "Manticore", was described as being "about a beautiful mythological horror that comes to be feared as the disfigurehead [sic] of foreign occupation in the Indian provinces". "Illicitus" and "Pallid Reflection" meanwhile, involve "lycanthropy and vampirism"; "For Your Vulgar Delectation" and "Frost on Her Pillow" are "grim fairy tales"; and "The Abhorrent" and "Siding with the Titans" are said to "extol tentacular Lovecraftian values".

"Frost on Her Pillow" was the first video to promote the album, after "For Your Vulgar Delectation" and "Manticore" were uploaded to Peaceville's SoundCloud account.

== Reception ==
Professional ratings
Aggregate scores
Source	Rating
Metacritic	70/100
Review scores
Source	Rating
AllMusic	3/5 stars
Exclaim!	6/10
Kerrang!	3/5 stars
Loudwire	3/5 stars
NME	6/10
PopMatters	8/10 stars

The Manticore and Other Horrors has received a generally favourable response from critics. PopMatters called it "the most vital record released by the band in almost a decade", while Kerrang! wrote "There's nothing here that Cradle of Filth haven't done much better elsewhere."

== Track listing ==
All lyrics are written by Dani Filth; all music is composed by Paul Allender, Martin "Marthus" Škaroupka and DJ Gunnarson.

No.	Title	Length
1.	"The Unveiling of O" (instrumental)	2:07
2.	"The Abhorrent"	5:53
3.	"For Your Vulgar Delectation"	4:46
4.	"Illicitus"	5:24
5.	"Manticore"	5:53
6.	"Frost on Her Pillow"	4:12
7.	"Huge Onyx Wings Behind Despair"	4:23
8.	"Pallid Reflection"	5:34
9.	"Siding with the Titans"	5:17
10.	"Succumb to This"	4:43
11.	"Sinfonia" (Instrumental)	3:25
Total length:		51:37

Deluxe edition
No.	Title	Length
11.	"Nightmares of an Ether Drinker"	4:32
12.	"Death, the Great Adventure"	6:18
13.	"Sinfonia" (Instrumental)	3:25
Total length:		62:17

== Personnel ==
Cradle of Filth

- Dani Filth – lead vocals
- Paul Allender – guitars
- Marthus – drums, orchestration

Guest/session musicians

- Daniel Firth – bass
- Lucy Atkins – vocals (female)
- Choir formed by Jill Fallow, Scarlet Summer, Lucy Atkins, India Price, Janet Granger, Petra Stiles-Swinton, Anita Kilpatrick, Robert L. Friars, Daniel Oxblood, Joseph Kelly, Jasper Conway
- Choir conducted & arranged by Will Graney.

Additional personnel

- Scott Atkins – mixing, engineering, mastering
- Doug Cook – additional engineering
- Mark Harwood – additional engineering
- Matt Vickerstaff – album art
- Kewin Miceli – additional images
- Travis Smith – additional images

== Charts ==
Chart (2012)	Peak position
Austrian Albums (Ö3 Austria)	63
Belgian Albums (Ultratop Flanders)	92
Belgian Albums (Ultratop Wallonia)	99
Finnish Albums (Suomen virallinen lista)	24
French Albums (SNEP)	94
German Albums (Offizielle Top 100)	56
US Billboard 200	96
US Independent Albums (Billboard)	16
US Top Hard Rock Albums (Billboard)	11
US Top Rock Albums (Billboard)	30
