= Dani Filth =

English extreme metal vocalist

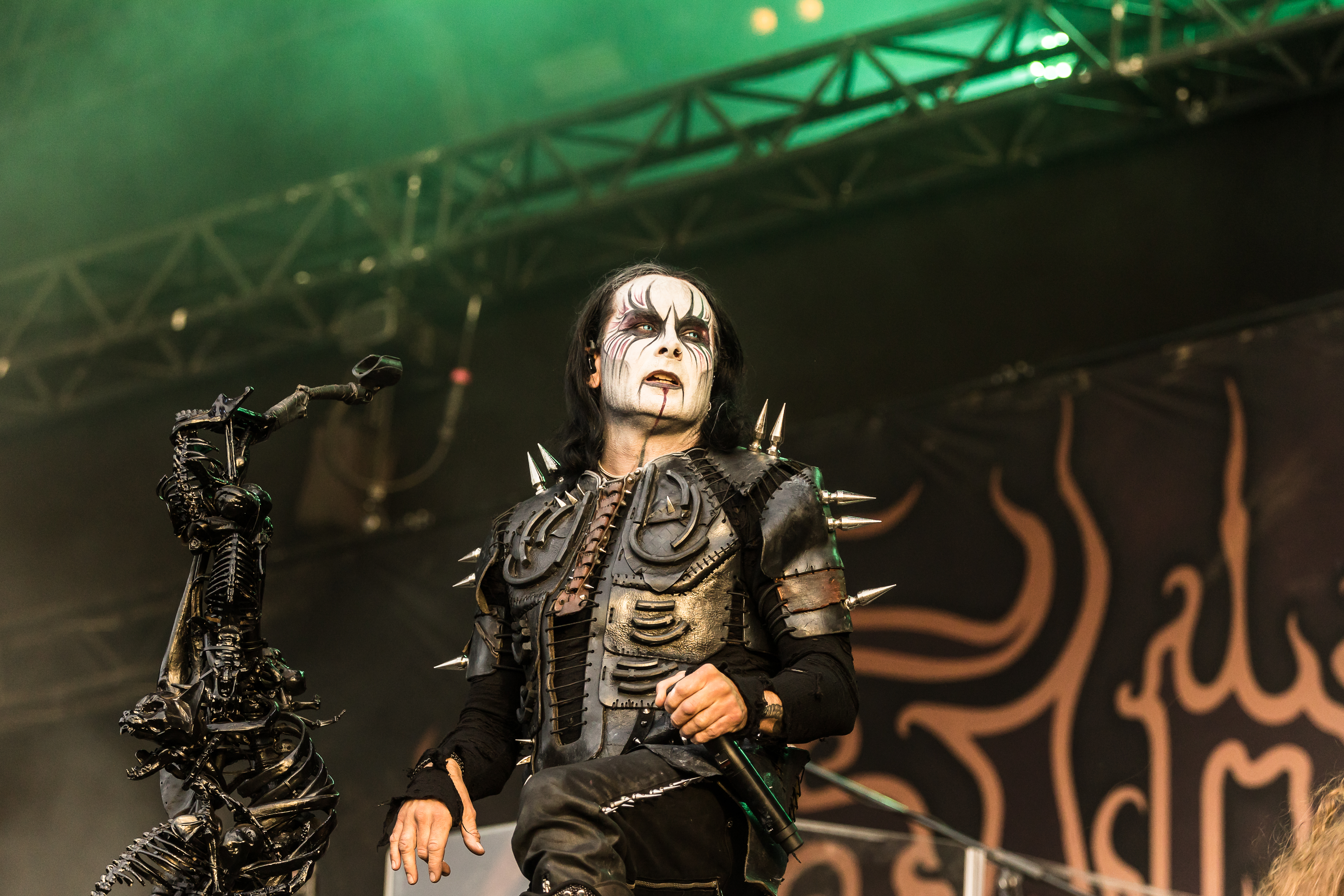
- Dani Filth performing with Cradle of Filth in 2025

Background information
- Also known as: Dani Filth; Lord Filth
- Born: Daniel Lloyd Davey; 25 July 1973 (age 53); Hertford, Hertfordshire, England
- Genres: Extreme metal; black metal; gothic metal; symphonic metal
- Occupations: Vocalist; songwriter
- Years active: 1989–present
- Member of: Cradle of Filth; Devilment

Daniel Lloyd Davey (born 25 July 1973), known professionally as Dani Filth, is an English singer who is the lead vocalist, lyricist and founding member of the extreme metal band Cradle of Filth.

== Personal life ==
Daniel Lloyd Davey was born to Susan Janet Moore and Laurence John Davey in Hertford and is the eldest child of four.

He married Toni King on 31 October 2005 in Ipswich but they separated in 2018. The couple have a daughter.

== Career ==
Dani Filth's present and primary band is Cradle of Filth. He also has been lending his voice to the band Devilment, a side project that has taken off into a full-time job in between Cradle records. His earliest bands were Carnival Fruitcake, The Lemon Grove Kids, PDA, Feast on Excrement, the Bondage Boys, and Hash Gordon and the Drug Barons. He named Judas Priest, Venom, Emperor, Destruction, Slayer, Iron Maiden, Sabbat, Misfits, Paradise Lost and Tim Burton's The Nightmare Before Christmas among his major influences.

At the age of eighteen, Filth took up a job at a Chinese restaurant. He later chose his career in music over an internship at a newspaper, although his "Dani's Inferno" column ran for two years in Metal Hammer during the late 1990s.

He has co-written and released The Gospel of Filth with Gavin Baddeley. He had been accused many times of being a Satanist, but has denounced such rumours, stating instead to being "more of a Luciferian."

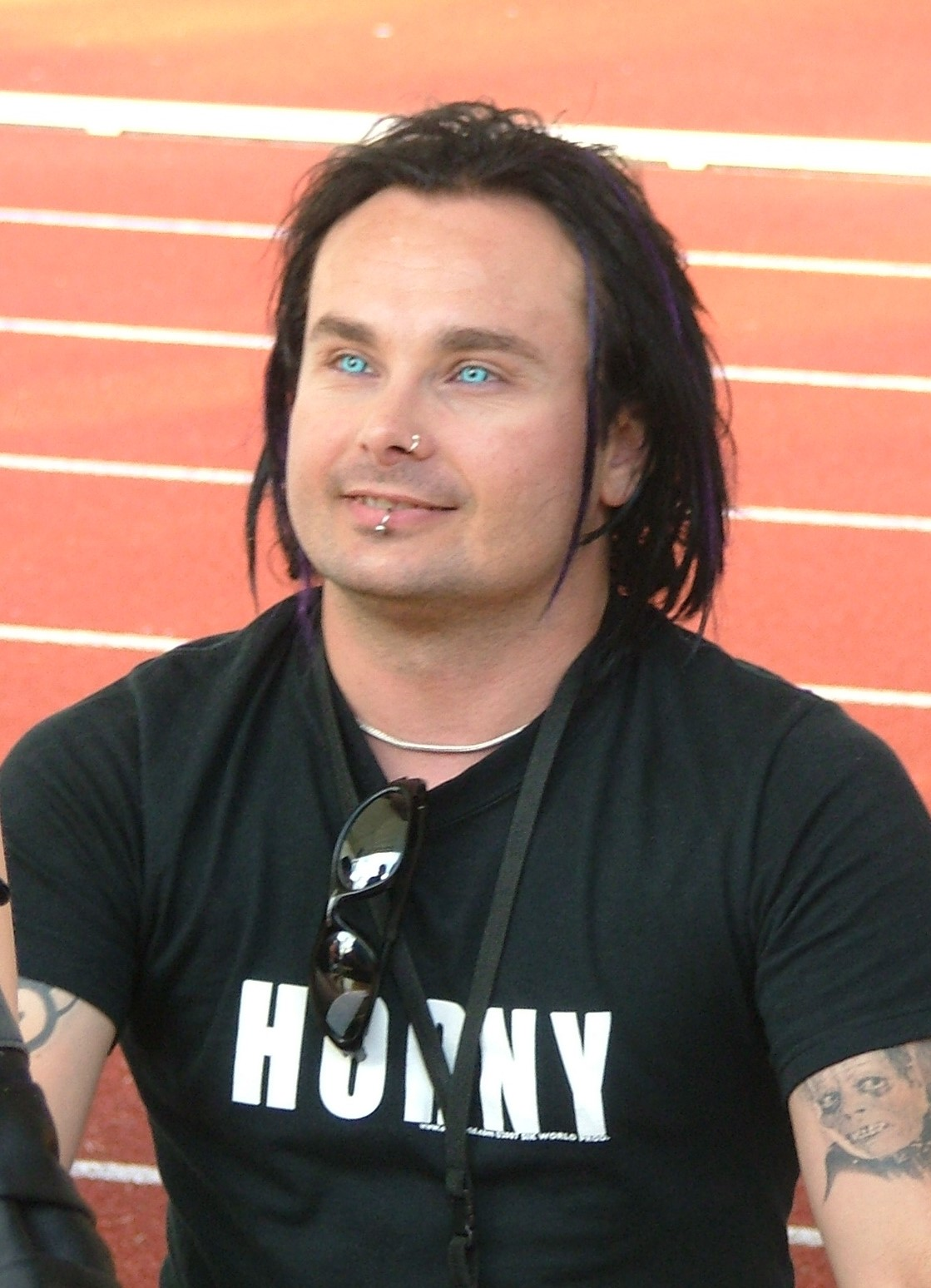
Davey in 2008

Away from Cradle, Filth appeared on the Roadrunner United CD in 2005 (contributing vocals to "Dawn of a Golden Age"), and recorded the song "(She's) The Mother of Tears" with Claudio Simonetti and Simonetti's band Daemonia, for the soundtrack of Dario Argento's film The Mother of Tears.

Filth participated in the Temple of the Black Moon project in 2012 with guitarist Rob Caggiano, black metal musician King ov Hell on bass, and drummer John Tempesta. The supergroup aimed to combine rawer, extreme metal with the softer more melodious sounds of progressive rock, describing the band's sound as a "cross between Celtic Frost and Tool". Filth has also released two albums with Devilment since 2014.

His high profile has led to a handful of film and television roles. In 2000, Filth appeared in the movie Cradle of Fear as The Man, a deranged psychopath taking revenge on his father's persecutors. In 2003, he provided the voice of the eponymous main character in the feature-length animation Dominator. Moreover, Filth has appeared numerous times on British television, most notably 1998's Living With the Enemy, Never Mind the Buzzcocks in 2001, Big Brother's Big Mouth in 2008. He has also appeared on the American series Viva La Bam in 2005, and was interviewed for two episodes of the Metal Evolution series, on shock rock and extreme metal in 2012 and 2014 respectively.

In 2010, he was ranked 95 in the Hit Parader's Top 100 Metal Vocalists of All Time.

Scottish death metal band Party Cannon dedicated Dani the song "I Believe in Dani Filth", released in December 2021 with an animated version of Dani in a Street Fighter-styled video.

== Discography ==
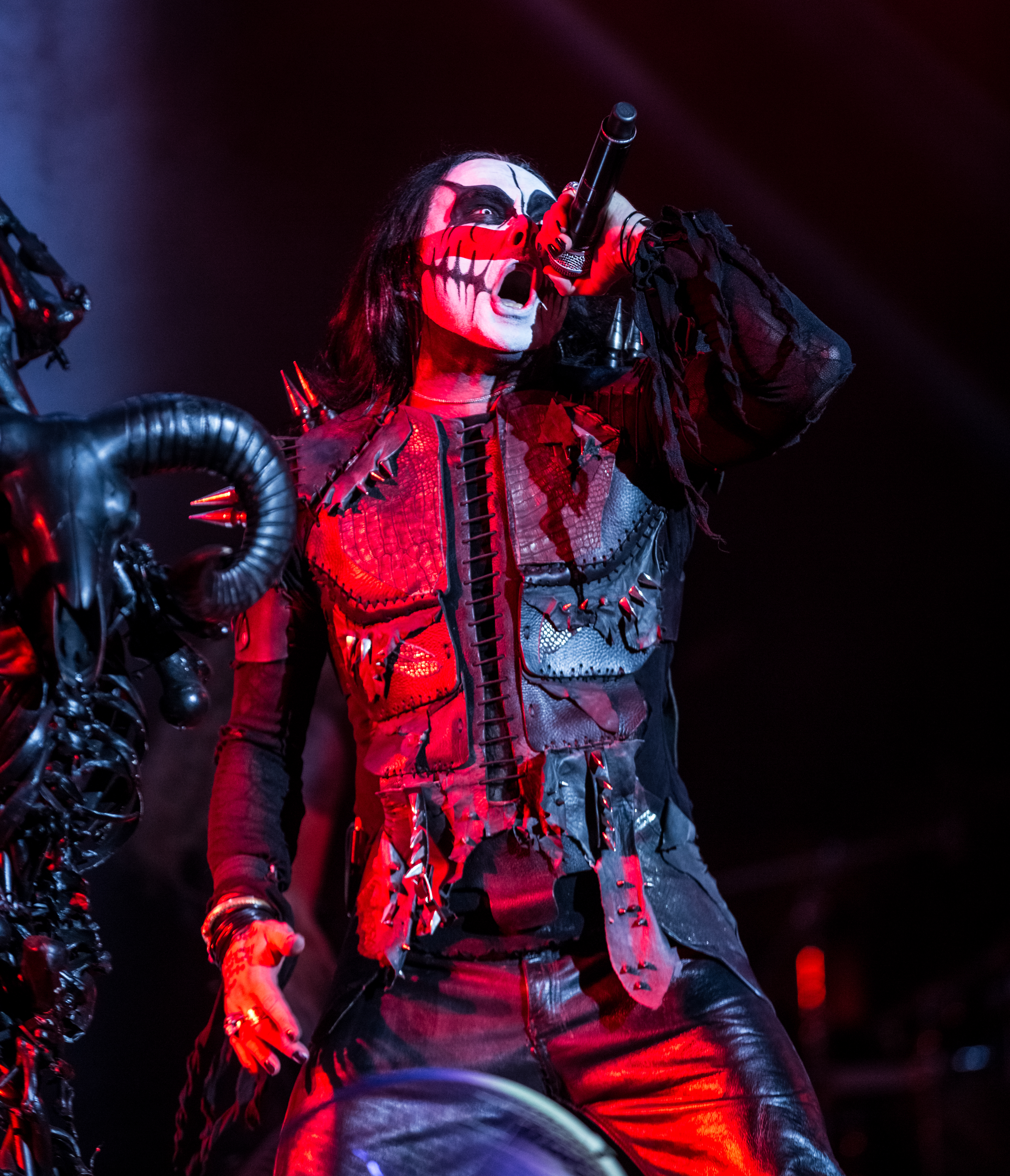
Dani Filth performing at Wacken Open Air 2015

=== Cradle of Filth ===
- The Principle of Evil Made Flesh (1994)
- Dusk... and Her Embrace (1996)
- Cruelty and the Beast (1998)
- Midian (2000)
- Damnation and a Day (2003)
- Nymphetamine (2004)
- Thornography (2006)
- Godspeed on the Devil's Thunder (2008)
- Darkly, Darkly, Venus Aversa (2010)
- The Manticore and Other Horrors (2012)
- Hammer of the Witches (2015)
- Cryptoriana – The Seductiveness of Decay (2017)
- Existence Is Futile (2021)
- The Screaming of the Valkyries (2025)

=== Devilment ===
- The Great and Secret Show (2014)
- Devilment II – The Mephisto Waltzes (2016)

=== Guest appearances ===
- Christian Death – "Zodiac (He Is Still Out There...)" and "Peek a Boo" from the album Born Again Anti Christian (2000)
- Obsidian – "Massada" from the On the Path of Others We Feed (EP) (2000)
- Dr. Haze & the Circus of Horrors – "Judgment Day" from the album The Circus of Horrors (Welcome to the Freakshow) (2001) (also included on An Evil Anthology (2013))
- Roadrunner United – Lead vocals on "Dawn of a Golden Age" (2005)
- Claudio Simonetti – "Mater Lacrimarum" from The Third Mother Soundtrack (2007)
- Sarah Jezebel Deva – "This Is My Curse" from the Malediction EP (2012)
- Motionless in White – "Puppets 3 (The Grand Finale)" from the album Reincarnate (2014)
- The 69 Eyes – "Two Horns Up" and "The Last House On The Left" (also featuring Calico Cooper and Wednesday 13) from the album West End (2014)
- Schoolcraft – "Fading Star" (2014)
- Simone Simons – "The Creator and the Destroyer" from the rock opera Karmaflow (2015)
- Eastern Front – "Crimson Mourn" from the album EmpirE (2016)
- Tank – "Shellshock" from the album Re-Ignition (2019)
- Bring Me the Horizon – "Wonderful Life" from the album Amo (2019) (#35 US Billboard Hot Mainstream Rock Tracks)
- Twiztid – "Neon Vamp" from the album Unlikely Prescription (2021)
- Kreator – "Betrayer" from the live album Live at Bloodstock 2021 (2022)
- Tarja Turunen – "I Don't Care" from the album Frisson Noir (2026)
