= Cradle of Filth =

English extreme metal band

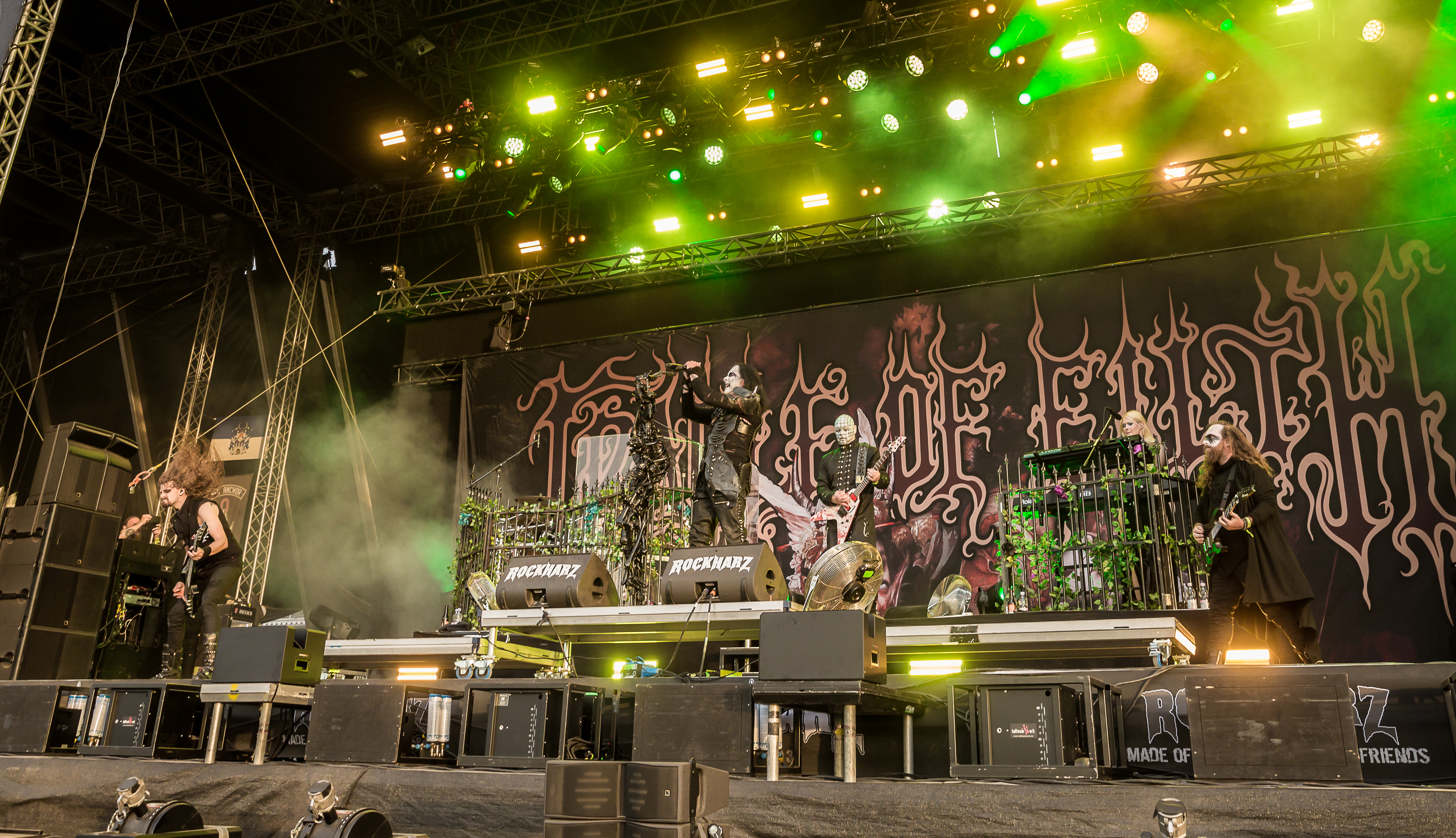
- Cradle of Filth in 2025

Background information
- Origin: Suffolk, England
- Genre: Extreme metal
- Years active: 1991–present
- Labels: Cacophonous; Music for Nations; Fierce; Mayhem; Metal Blade; Abracadaver; Sony; Roadrunner; Peaceville; Nuclear Blast; Napalm
- Members: Dani Filth; Martin "Marthus" Škaroupka; Daniel Firth; Donny Burbage; Joff Bailey
- Past members: See former members here
- Website: www.cradleoffilth.com

Cradle of Filth are an English extreme metal band formed in Suffolk in 1991. The band's style evolved from black metal to a cleaner and more "produced" amalgam of gothic metal, symphonic metal and other genres. Their lyrics and imagery are influenced by Gothic literature, poetry, mythology and horror films. The band consist of founding member and vocalist Dani Filth, drummer Martin "Marthus" Škaroupka, bassist Daniel Firth, and guitarists Donny Burbage and Joff Bailey.

The band have broken from their original niche by courting mainstream publicity. This increased accessibility brought coverage from the likes of Kerrang! and MTV, along with main stage appearances at major festivals such as Ozzfest, Download and the mainstream Sziget Festival. They have been perceived as Satanic, even though their lyrics seldom reference Satanism. Their use of Satanic imagery has been for shock value rather than seriously held beliefs. Though the band are English, hailing from Suffolk, they have included members from Sweden, the Czech Republic, and the United States.

== History ==
=== Early years (1991–1996) ===
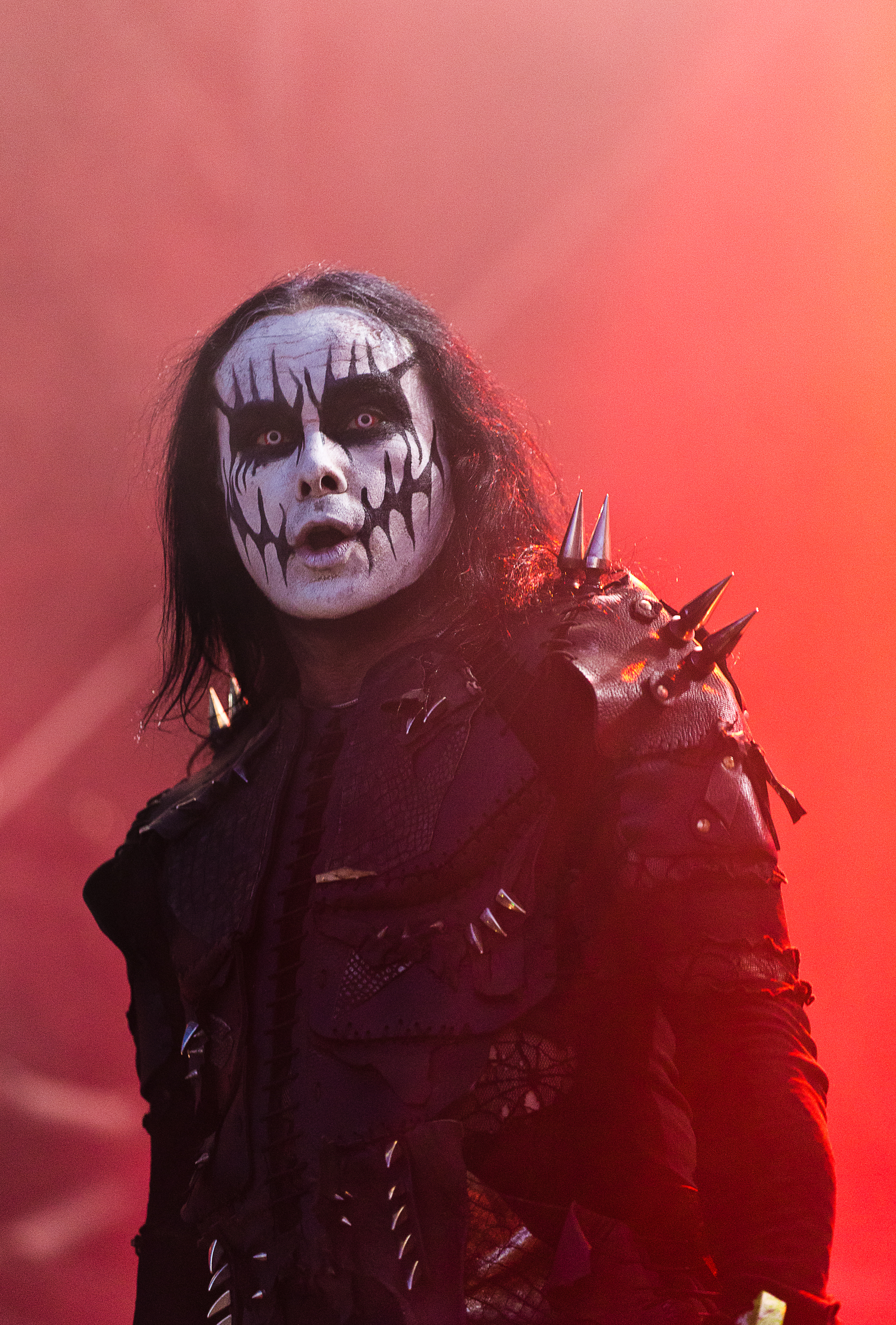
Founding member and vocalist, Dani Filth at Rockharz in 2015.

Cradle of Filth released three demos (Invoking the Unclean, Orgiastic Pleasures Foul and Total Fucking Darkness) in their first three years. These were recorded amidst rapid line-up fluctuations that have continued ever since, with the band having more than thirty musicians in their history. The album Goetia was recorded prior to the third demo and set for release on Tombstone Records, but all tracks were wiped when Tombstone went out of business and the band could not afford to buy the recordings. The band signed to Cacophonous Records, and their debut album, The Principle of Evil Made Flesh, was Cacophonous's first release in 1994. An improvement in production from most of their demos, the album was a sparse and embryonic version of what was to come. Lead singer Dani Filth's vocals bore little similarity to the style he would develop. The album was well-received, and in June 2006, found its way into Metal Hammer's list of the top ten black metal albums of the previous twenty years.

Cradle of Filth's relationship with Cacophonous soured. The band accused the label of contractual and financial mismanagement. Legal proceedings took up most of 1995, and the original version of the band's second album, Dusk... and Her Embrace, was recorded by the Principle... lineup for Cacophonous but scrapped. Subsequently re-worked with new band members for Music For Nations (see below), the embryonic Cacophonous version was released as Dusk... and Her Embrace: The Original Sin in July 2016.

The band signed to Music for Nations in 1996 after one more contractually obligated Cacophonous recording, the EP V Empire or Dark Faerytales in Phallustein, which was hastily written as a Cacophonous escape-plan. Despite the circumstances of its release, its tracks are staples of the band's live sets to this day, and "Queen of Winter, Throned" was listed among twenty-five "essential extreme metal anthems" in a 2006 issue of Kerrang! magazine. The EP was Sarah Jezebel Deva's debut with the band, replacing Andrea Meyer, Cradle of Filth's first female vocalist and self-styled "satanic advisor". Deva appeared on every subsequent Cradle release and tour until 2010's Darkly, Darkly, Venus Aversa, but was never a full band member, since she also performed with The Kovenant, Therion and Mortiis, and fronted Angtoria with Cradle of Filth's former bassist, Dave Pybus.

=== Music for Nations era (1996–2001) ===
The re-worked and re-recorded Dusk... and Her Embrace followed the same year. It was a critically acclaimed breakthrough that expanded the band's fan-base throughout Europe and the rest of the world. Cradle of Filth's first album for Music for Nations set the tone for what would follow. The album's production values matched the band's ambition, whilst Filth's vocals were at their most extreme.

The infamous Vestal Masturbation T-shirt design

The increasingly theatrical stage shows of the 1997 European tour helped keep Cradle of Filth in the public eye, as did a line of controversial merchandise, including a T-shirt depicting a masturbating nun on the front and the slogan "Jesus is a cunt" in large letters on the back. The T-shirt is banned in New Zealand, a handful of fans have faced court appearances and fines for wearing the shirt in public, and some band members attracted hostile attention when they wore similar "I Love Satan" shirts to the Vatican. Alex Mosson, the Lord Provost of Glasgow from 1999 to 2003, called the shirts (and by implication the band) "sick and offensive". The band used the quote on the back cover of the 2005 DVD Peace Through Superior Firepower.

In 1998, Filth began his "Dani's Inferno" column for Metal Hammer. The band appeared in the BBC documentary series Living with the Enemy (on tour with a fan and his disapproving mother and sister) and released their third studio album, Cruelty and the Beast. A concept album based on Elizabeth Báthory, the album featured Ingrid Pitt guest narrating as the Countess, a role she first played in Hammer Film Productions' 1971 film Countess Dracula. The album led to Cradle of Filth's US debut, and Filth claimed it in 2003 as the Cradle of Filth album he was most proud of, although he was dissatisfied with its sound quality.

The following year, the band continued to tour, but released the EP From the Cradle to Enslave, accompanied by the band's first music video, which formed the centrepiece of the DVD PanDaemonAeon. Replete with graphic nudity and gore, the video was directed by Alex Chandon, who would produce further Cradle of Filth promo clips and DVD documentaries, as well as the full-length feature film Cradle of Fear.

The band released their fourth studio album in the Autumn of 2000. Midian was based on the Clive Barker novel Cabal and its film adaptation, Nightbreed. Midian featured guest narrator Doug Bradley, who starred in Nightbreed but is best known for playing Pinhead in the Hellraiser series. Bradley's line "Oh, no tears please" from the song "Her Ghost in the Fog" is a Pinhead quote from the first Hellraiser film ("No tears, please. It's a waste of good suffering..."). Bradley reappeared on later albums Nymphetamine, Thornography and Godspeed on the Devil's Thunder. The video for "Her Ghost in the Fog" received heavy rotation on MTV2 and other metal channels, and the track appeared in the soundtrack of Ginger Snaps (it would later feature in the video game Brütal Legend).

=== Sony interlude (2001–2004) ===
The longest period between full-length Cradle of Filth albums was a busy time for the band. Bitter Suites to Succubi was released on the band's Abracadaver label, a mix of four new songs, re-recordings of three songs from The Principle of Evil Made Flesh, two instrumental tracks, and a cover of The Sisters of Mercy's "No Time to Cry". Stylistically similar to Midian, the collection was, at the time, unique among Cradle of Filth releases for featuring the same band members as its predecessor. Further stop-gap releases followed in the form of the "best of" package Lovecraft & Witch Hearts and the live album, Live Bait for the Dead. The band (principally Filth) appeared in the horror film Cradle of Fear while they negotiated with Sony Music.

Everything in the band is a democracy decision.. Dani has just been painted black in the press...To be honest, to find six people who think along the same lines and share the same interests and like have everything else sort of on a similar level. This band takes up so much time from us, it’s hard to keep everybody focused at the same time and on the same page. So it’s a lot to do with why there have been so many members.

— Adrian Erlandsson, on the working relationships within the band and line-up changes.

Damnation and a Day arrived in 2003. Sony's heavyweight funding underwrote Cradle of Filth's ambition by bringing a real orchestra into the studio (the 101 piece Budapest Film Orchestra including the 40 piece Choir replacing the increasingly sophisticated synthesisers of previous albums) and marking the band's gestation—for one album only—into full-blown symphonic metal. Damnation featured the band's most complex compositions to date, outran its predecessors by a good twenty minutes, and produced two more videos: the Jan Švankmajer-influenced Mannequin and Babalon A.D. (So Glad for the Madness), based on Pier Paolo Pasolini's film Salò. Roughly half the album was inspired by John Milton's Paradise Lost—showing the events of the fall of man through the eyes of Lucifer—while the remainder comprised stand-alone tracks such as the Nile tribute "Doberman Pharaoh" and the aforementioned "Babalon A. D.", a reference to Aleister Crowley. "Babalon A. D." was the first DVD-only single to reach the UK's top 40 charts, according to the Guinness Book of Records of British Hit Singles and Albums. Feeling Sony's enthusiasm waning, Cradle of Filth moved to Roadrunner Records after barely a year.

=== Move to Roadrunner (2004–2010) ===
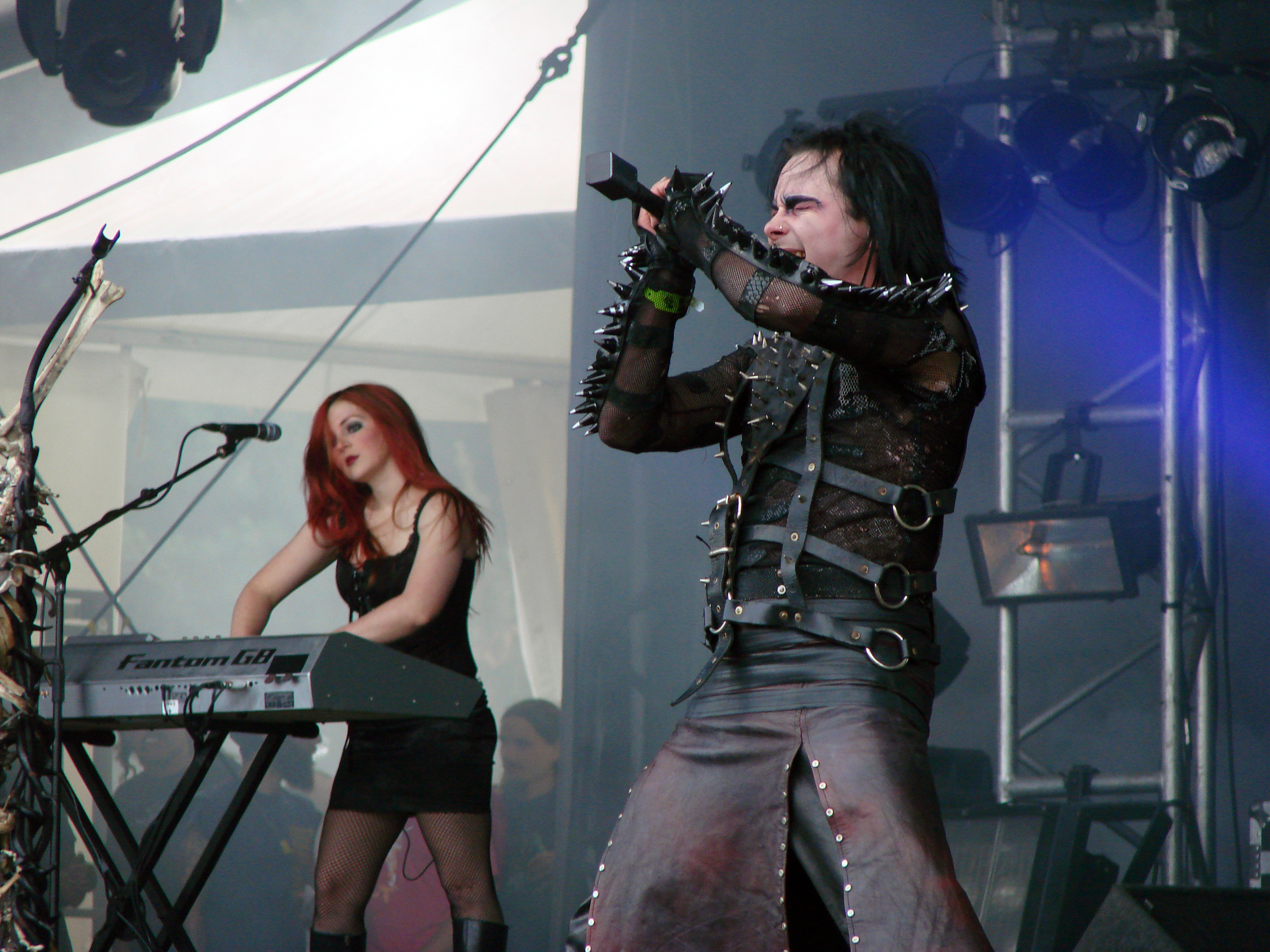
Filth and Ellyllon during the band's performance at Hellfest in 2009.

2004's Nymphetamine was the band's first full album since Dusk...and Her Embrace to not be based around an overarching concept (although references to the works of H. P. Lovecraft are made more than once). Cradle of Filth's bassist Dave Pybus described it as an "eclectic mix between the group's Damnation and Cruelty albums with a renewed vigour for melody, songmanship [sic] and plain fucking weirdness." Nymphetamine debuted at No. 89 on the Billboard Top 200 chart, selling just under 14,000 copies. The band's growing mainstream acceptance was confirmed when the album's title track was nominated for a Grammy award. The album's track "Coffin Fodder" was referenced in an episode of the Channel 4 sit-com The IT Crowd in February 2006.

Thornography was released in October 2006. According to Dani Filth, the title "represents mankind's obsession with sin and self... an addiction to self-punishment or something equally poisonous... a mania." On the album's musical direction, Filth told Revolver magazine, "I'm not saying it's 'experimental', but we're definitely testing the limits of what we can do... A lot of the songs are really rhythmical—thrashy, almost—but they're all also really catchy." A flurry of pre-release controversy saw Samuel Araya's original cover artwork scrapped and replaced in May 2006, although numerous CD booklets had been printed with the original image. Thornography received a similar reception to Nymphetamine, garnering generally positive reviews, but raising a few eyebrows with the inclusion of a cover of Heaven 17's "Temptation" (featuring guest vocals from Dirty Harry), which was released as a digital single and accompanying video shortly before the album. Thornography entered the Billboard chart at No. 66, having sold nearly 13,000 copies.

Long-term drummer Adrian Erlandsson departed the band in November 2006, to devote his energies to his two side projects, Needleye and Nemhain. The official press release from Roadrunner saw Erlandsson state, "I have enjoyed my time with Cradle but it is now time to move on. I feel I am going out on a high as Thornography is definitely our best album to date". He was replaced with Martin "Marthus" Škaroupka.

Work on the eighth studio album, released in October 2008 as Godspeed on the Devil's Thunder, began early that year following a Gwar-supported tour in Russia, Ukraine, United Kingdom, Romania, Slovakia and North America. Godspeed is a concept album based on the legend of Gilles de Rais, a 15th-century French nobleman who fought alongside Joan of Arc and accumulated great wealth before becoming an occultist, sexual deviant and alleged murderer. Kerrang! preferred the album to the "relatively weak" Thornography, calling it "grandiose and epic", while Metal Hammer said it had "genuine narrative depth and emotional resonance", and Terrorizer called it "cohesive, consistent and convincing". It sold 11,000 copies in its week of release, entering the Billboard 200 at No. 48.

==== Controversy over Suffolk Icon nomination (2010) ====
In 2010, Dani Filth was nominated by members of the public for the "Suffolk Icons" campaign, run by the organisation Choose Suffolk to promote the county through iconic images of people, places, and products. While many nominations focused on traditional scenes and figures such as beach huts, historic buildings, and Sir Bobby Robson, Filth's image quickly became the most popular, receiving over 13,000 votes—more than six times the total of the next most popular nominee. Despite this, Filth was excluded from the final shortlist of 20 icons selected by a judging panel, which featured only conventional and historic imagery. The decision to drop him sparked criticism and debate over cultural representation and the dismissal of public input. A spokesperson for Choose Suffolk stated that the panel had selected finalists they felt had "countywide resonance," though no official reason was given for Filth's exclusion. Responding to the nomination at the time, Filth said: "I've spent the majority of my life either in Ipswich or Woodbridge and Hadleigh... so I guess this is where my heart lies. So in that respect it's a compliment really. Although, I prefer a pint of Adnams myself."

=== Peaceville Records (2010–2014) ===
Cradle of Filth's relationship with Roadrunner ended in April 2010, with the announcement that the band's next album would be released by the British independent label Peaceville Records, using Cradle of Filth's Abracadaver imprint. Dani Filth cited "the artistic restrictions and mindless inhibitions imposed by a major label" as the band's reason for going independent. Early press releases named the new album All Hallows Eve, but by August 2010 the title was confirmed as Darkly, Darkly, Venus Aversa. Released on 1 November 2010, it is a concept album in the same vein as its predecessor, Godspeed on the Devil's Thunder; this time centring on the demon Lilith, the first wife of the biblical Adam, and making reference to Greek, Egyptian and Sumerian mythology, the Knights Templar and the Carmelite Nuns. The label referred to it as "a dark tapestry of horror, madness and twisted sex", while Filth called its sound "creepily melodic, like Mercyful Fate or a dark Iron Maiden". Metal Hammer's Dom Lawson felt it was "another sumptuous and spectacular eruption of gothic melodrama, perverted sonic schlock and balls-out extreme metal bombast", and likened it to an "instalment in an ongoing series of novels."

The EP Evermore Darkly, featuring "new tracks and rarities", was released in October 2011. The package included a DVD with a tour documentary, a live DVD recorded at 2011's Graspop festival and the video for "Lilith Immaculate".

In April 2012, the compilation album Midnight in the Labyrinth was released, featuring orchestral re-recordings of songs from the band's first three albums and the V Empire EP. Dani Filth described it in the preceding months as "reinventing" the tracks as "full soundtrack quality stuff... with choirs, strings and some narration". This album's version of "Summer Dying Fast" was included on Evermore Darkly as a teaser for the full release (the Evermore track listing subtitles this version "Midnight in the Labyrinth breadcrumb trail"), and "A Gothic Romance (Red Roses for the Devil's Whore)" was released online via Peaceville's website on 4 April. Sarah Jezebel Deva returned to provide female vocals for Midnight in the Labyrinth, her first work with Cradle of Filth since her departure in 2008.

In July 2012, the band re-issued its back catalogue from 1994 to 2002, via The End Records.

Cradle of Filth's tenth studio album, The Manticore and Other Horrors, was released on 29 October 2012 in Europe, and on 30 October in North America. Paul Allender told Ultimate Guitar that "The last thing we want to do is come out with another album that sounds like the last two. We decided to change direction and go back to what we used to do with the female vocals; all the strong melody lines and harmonies... I've put a lot of punk-orientated riffs back into it again. It's really gone quite dark and pretty hardcore."

On 2 September 2013, Dani Filth announced on his monthly blog the crowd-funded Cradle of Filth comic book, "The Curse of Venus Aversa", and "a career-spanning double-disc 'best of'" compilation that is yet to be named.

In March 2014, Cradle of Filth announced the first ever commercial release of their 1993 demo Total Fucking Darkness. The album arrived on CD and limited edition vinyl the following May, on the independent Mordgrimm label. It features all the tracks from the original cassette, plus previously unreleased rehearsal recordings and the sole surviving track from their abandoned Goetia album.

=== Nuclear Blast Records (2014–2022) ===
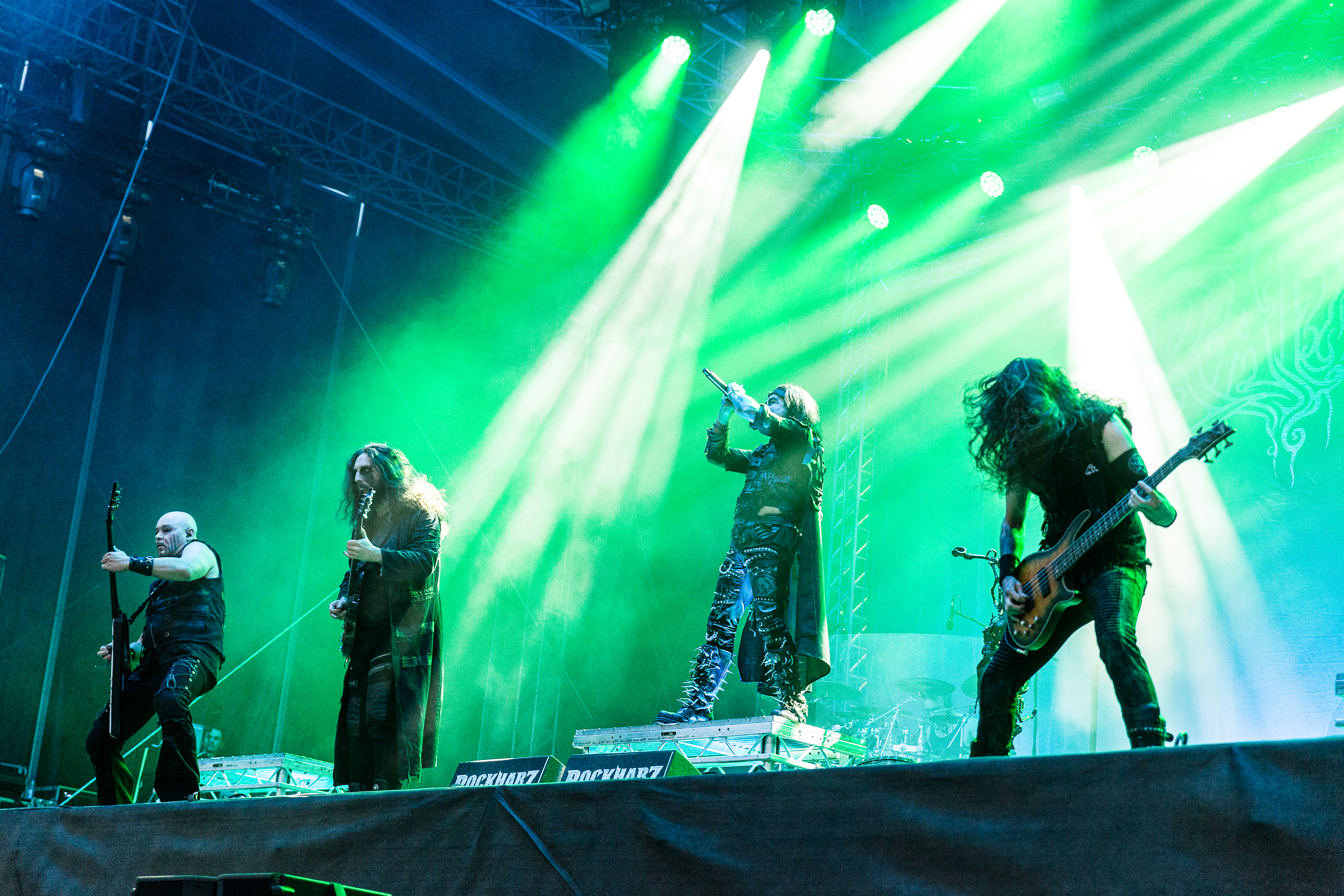
Cradle of Filth performing at Rockharz in 2019.

In April 2014, Paul Allender stated on his official Facebook account that he had left Cradle of Filth, in favour of his new band, White Empress. Dani Filth stated about Allender departing the band, "Paul has been enthralled [sic] in his own project and he could not do the tour due to personal reasons. Since then the band has grown as a unit, we were only writing as one guitarist for the last three records and we now have two very competent guitarists. Paul had a very strong opinion about doing that [writing single guitar parts], and we're a two-guitar band. So that may be one of the things that kind of opened the fissure a bit." James McIlroy left the band at around this point due to imminent surgery for a spinal injury. Both guitarists were replaced for upcoming tours with Marek "Ashok" Šmerda of the Czech groups Root and Inner Fear, and Richard Shaw of English acts Emperor Chung and NG26.

On 2 April 2014, Cradle of Filth's website announced that they were working on their follow-up to The Manticore and Other Horrors. Dani Filth announced that they expected a Spring 2015 release and that three songs had already been written.

At the moment all six members are working on material.... Everybody has contributed to this from Lindsay the keyboard player, Martin the drummer – everybody has been working very hard. We have to get most of it done by the time we get to Russia, so we have two and a half weeks and I have to finish the lyrics for a few songs but the songs are pretty much there; we just have to move stuff around and put some strange instrumentation.... This album will be very twin guitar driven, lots of very fast melodies a la Dusk... and Her Embrace and Cruelty and the Beast. We are aiming at 16–20 tracks then we will wheedle [sic] them down to make sure we have the best. It is very exciting.

— Dani Filth

On 11 November 2014 it was reported on the official Cradle of Filth Facebook page that they had signed to Nuclear Blast Records for their new album and were expected to begin recording the follow-up to The Manticore And Other Horrors later the same month. In early 2015, the working title of the album was revealed as Hammer of the Witches (inspired by the 1486 treatise on the prosecution of witches by Heinrich Kramer). This title was eventually confirmed as official. The album was recorded at Grindstone Studios in Suffolk, England, with a tentative release date of 26 June. Over 21 and 22 March, the band filmed scenes for a promo video for the song "Right Wing of the Garden Triptych". The shoot was in the hangar and fire station of former U.S. military base of Bentwaters, with additional narrative scenes (featuring actresses in a bondage setting) filmed on a farmstead near the Imperial War Museum Duxford. Sam Scott-Hunter directed the video.

On 21 April 2015, the album's release date was updated to sometime in July, and the band revealed Hammer of the Witches' cover artwork by Latvian post-modernist artist Arthur Berzinsh. The album was officially released through Nuclear Blast on 10 July 2015. The subsequent world tour included the band's largest set of UK dates for eight years in late 2015, and a set of North American shows in early 2016.

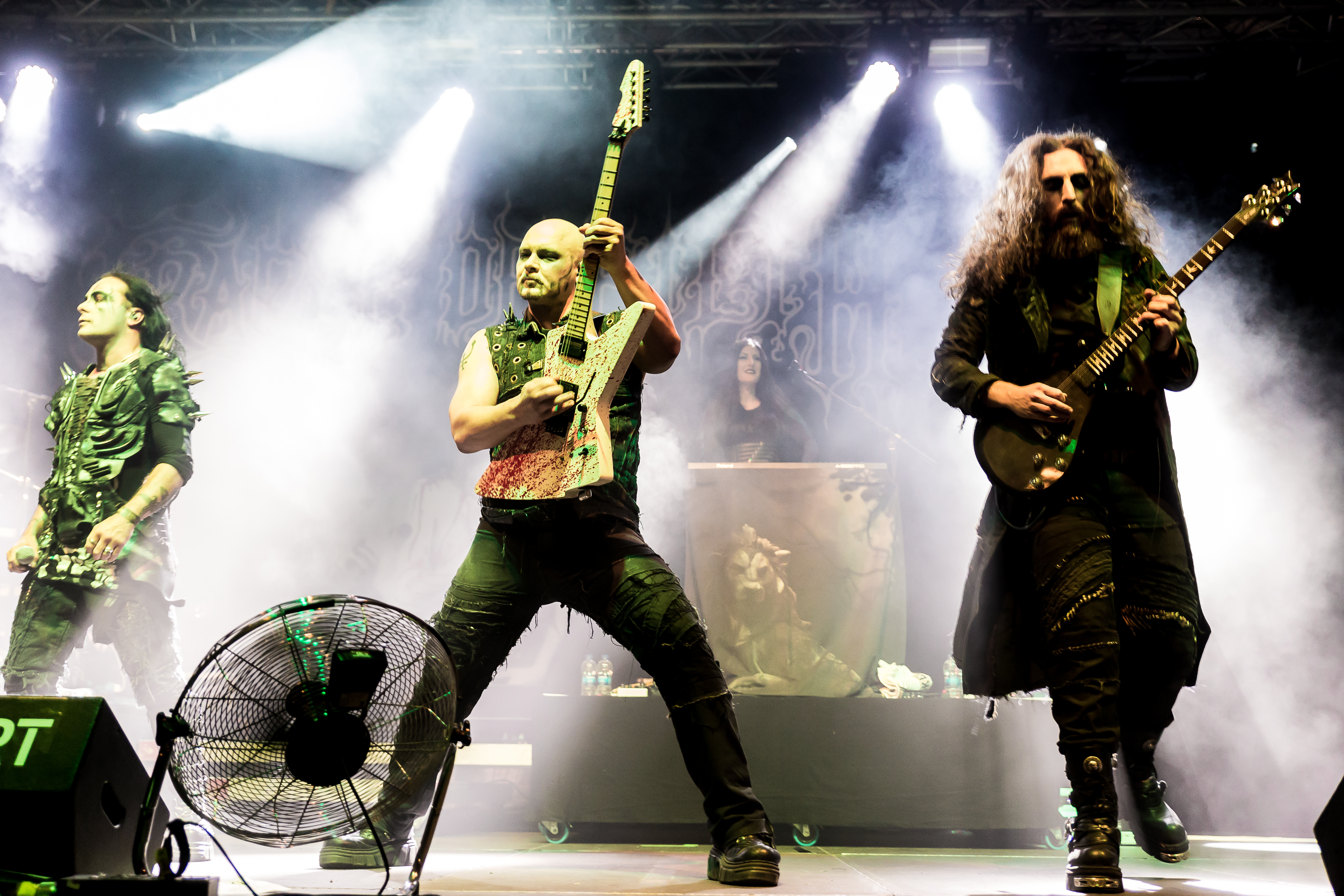
Cradle of Filth performing in 2018.

On 16 June 2017, the title of their twelfth studio album was revealed as Cryptoriana – The Seductiveness of Decay and it was given an official release date of 22 September 2017 through Nuclear Blast Records.

On 10 February 2020, it was announced on the band's social media that keyboardist and vocalist Lindsay Schoolcraft had departed the band, citing mental health reasons, as well as giving the band room to progress. In the post, the band announced that a replacement had been found, but did not immediately disclose their identity. Anabelle Iratni was later announced as the new keyboardist for the band in May 2021.

The band's thirteenth album, Existence Is Futile, was released on 22 October 2021. A music video was released for the single "Crawling King Chaos" in advance of the album on 30 July 2021. On 4 May 2022, Dani Filth announced the departure of guitarist Richard Shaw and keyboardist Iratni. Filth stated, "We have to respect that people have personal commitments and/or sometimes find the career choice of being in a band like Cradle of Filth a tad overwhelming". At the same time, Donny Burbage joined as the new guitarist with Zoe Marie Federoff as the new keyboard player.

=== Napalm Records (2022–present) ===
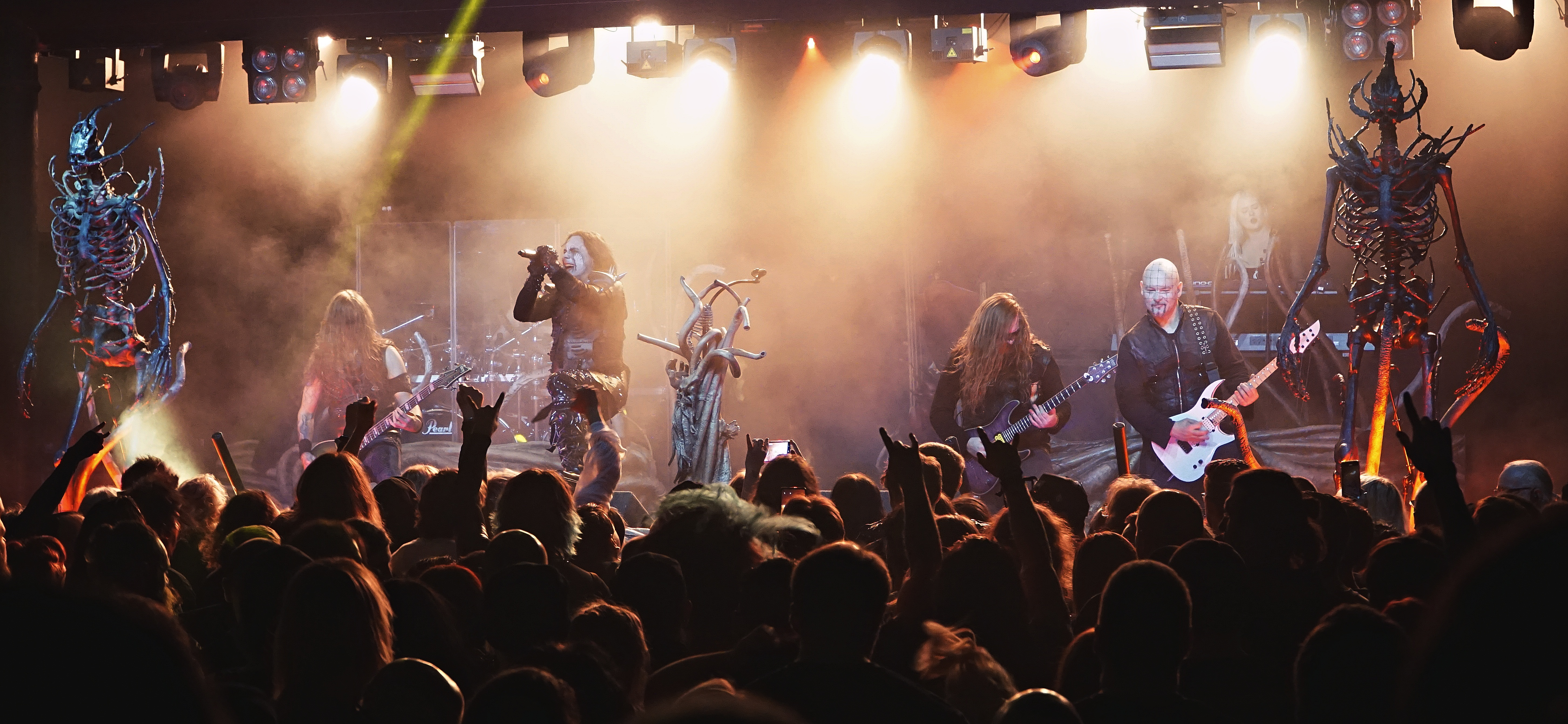
Cradle of Filth performing in 2022.

On 9 May 2022, the band announced that they had signed to Napalm Records.

Vocalist Dani Filth mentioned in August 2022 that the band had been working on a collaboration with musician Ed Sheeran since the previous year. Filth explained that Sheeran had begun recording his vocals for the collaboration, but that Sheeran's touring schedule and the birth of his child caused delays. Sheeran's interest in a collaboration with Cradle of Filth stems from listening to metal bands like Cradle of Filth and Slipknot during his childhood.

In 2023, a music video was released for "She is a Fire". The song is one of two studio tracks from the Existence is Futile recording sessions to be included on the live album Trouble and Their Double Lives, along with live tracks recorded during the band's Cryptoriana World Tour. Trouble and Their Double Lives was released on 28 April 2023. Shortly after the release of the live album, the band entered the studio to begin recording their upcoming fourteenth studio album, which was mixed and mastered in July 2024. The album's title, The Screaming of the Valkyries, was revealed on 8 January 2025, and was released on 21 March 2025.

On 24 August 2025, Federoff announced her departure from Cradle of Filth mid-tour, citing personal reasons. In a following statement, she confirmed that Šmerda was planning to leave the band at the end of the year. Two days later, Šmerda confirmed that he was leaving Cradle of Filth following their Latin American tour, citing "unprofessional behavior", "low pay" and "high stress". On the same day, Cradle of Filth released a statement stating that Šmerda had been fired, effective immediately. The band finished the tour with crew member Kelsey Peters and Czech guitarist Jiří Háb filling in.

Following their departures, Federoff and Šmerda filed a complaint to begin legal proceedings against the band on 2 October 2025, claiming unauthorized commercial exploitation of their likenesses, unpaid royalties, and defamation. By December 2025, former members Allender, Schoolcraft, and Shaw joined the lawsuit, with the new plaintiffs making claims of copyright infringement.

On 29 March 2026, Filth confirmed that work on the band's fifteenth studio album had begun. The band announced the addition of Joff Bailey as their new guitarist on 4 May 2026.

== Musical style and influences ==
Though generally classified as an extreme metal band, Cradle of Filth's musical style has been described as symphonic metal, symphonic black metal, gothic metal, symphonic death metal, gothic black metal, dark metal, and symphonic gothic metal. (Note: Musical styles: "symphonic metal"; "symphonic black metal"; "gothic metal"; "symphonic death metal"; "gothic black metal"; "dark metal"; "symphonic gothic metal") Though the band emerged with a style that leaned heavily toward black metal, they have since distanced themselves from the genre. Additionally, some tracks in their first album are considered to be akin to death metal and thrash metal.

Despite these classifications, Cradle of Filth's particular genre has provoked a great deal of discussion, and their status as a black metal band or otherwise has been in debate since near the time that the group rose to fame. The band have cited acts that were heavily influential to black metal such as Bathory, Celtic Frost and Mercyful Fate among their influences, but Dani Filth, in a 1998 interview for BBC Radio 5 for example, said "I use the term 'heavy metal', rather than 'black metal', because I think that's a bit of a fad now. Call it what you like: death metal, black metal, any kind of metal...". Gavin Baddeley's 2006 Terrorizer interview states that "few folk, the band included, call Cradle black metal these days." In a 2006 interview with Terrorizer, then-guitarist Paul Allender said, "We were never a black metal band. The only thing that catered to that was the make-up. Even when The Principle of Evil Made Flesh came out—you look at Emperor and Burzum and all that stuff—we didn't sound anything like that. The way that I see it is that we were, and still are now, an extreme metal band."

However, the band's evolving sound has allowed them to continue resisting definitive categorisation. They have collaborated on projects such as Christian Death's Born Again Anti-Christian album (on the track "Peek-a-Boo") and have even experimented outside of metal music with dance remixes – such as "Twisting Further Nails", "Pervert's Church" and "Forgive Me Father (I'm in a Trance)".

Appearing on the BBC music quiz Never Mind the Buzzcocks on 9 April 2001, Filth jokingly described Cradle's sound as "heavy funk", and in an October 2006 interview stated, "we'd rather be known as solely 'Cradle of Filth', I think, than be hampered by stupid genre barriers."

== Band members ==
Current

- Dani Filth – lead vocals (1991–present)
- Martin "Marthus" Škaroupka – drums (2006–present)
- Daniel Firth – bass (2012–present)
- Donny Burbage – guitars (2022–present)
- Joff Bailey – guitars (2026–present)

== Discography ==
Studio albums

- The Principle of Evil Made Flesh (1994)
- Dusk... and Her Embrace (1996)
- Cruelty and the Beast (1998)
- Midian (2000)
- Damnation and a Day (2003)
- Nymphetamine (2004)
- Thornography (2006)
- Godspeed on the Devil's Thunder (2008)
- Darkly, Darkly, Venus Aversa (2010)
- The Manticore and Other Horrors (2012)
- Hammer of the Witches (2015)
- Cryptoriana – The Seductiveness of Decay (2017)
- Existence Is Futile (2021)
- The Screaming of the Valkyries (2025)
