= Anathema discography =

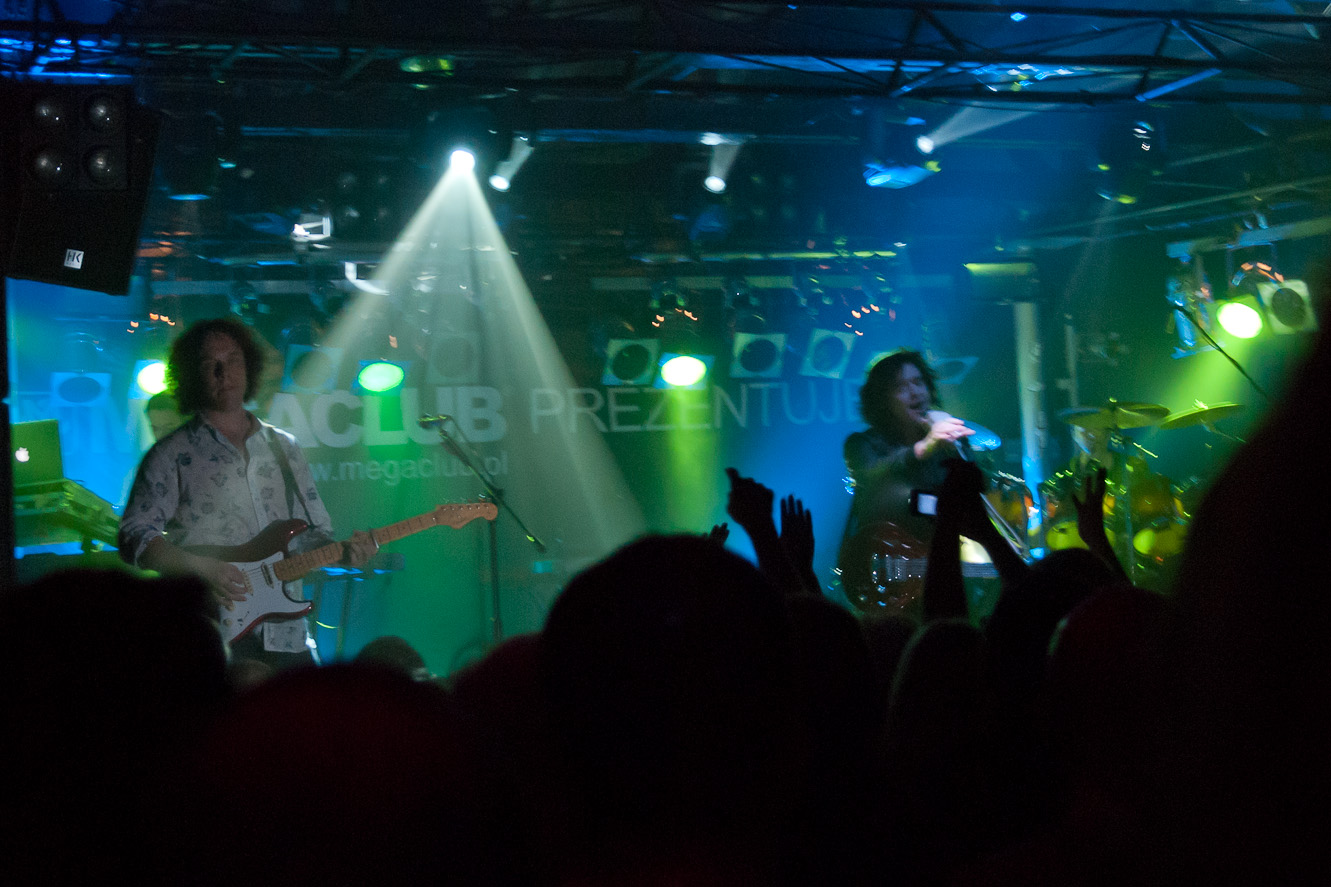
- Anathema, 2012
- Studio albums: 13
- EPs: 3
- Live albums: 3
- Compilation albums: 3
- Singles: 9
- Video albums: 5
- Music videos: 8
- Demos: 2

This is a discography of Anathema, a Liverpool-based rock band. They released three albums through Peaceville Records before switching to Music For Nations in 1998. Since 2010 the band have been releasing material through K Scope.

== Albums ==
=== Studio albums ===
Title	Album details	Peak chart positions											Sales
Title	Album details	FIN	GER	FRA	NLD	GRE	POL	BEL	NOR	AUT	SWI	UK	Sales
Serenades	Released: 15 February 1993; Label: Peaceville Records	—	—	—	—	—	—	—	—	—	—	—	
The Silent Enigma	Released: 6 November 1995; Label: Peaceville Records	—	—	—	—	—	—	—	—	—	—	—	
Eternity	Released: 25 November 1996; Label: Peaceville Records	—	—	—	—	—	—	—	—	—	—	—	
Alternative 4	Released: 22 June 1998; Label: Peaceville Records	—	—	—	—	—	—	—	—	—	—	—	
Judgement	Released: 21 June 1999; Label: Music For Nations	—	69	—	—	—	—	—	—	—	—	151	
A Fine Day to Exit	Released: 9 October 2001; Label: Music For Nations	34	95	124	—	—	22	—	—	—	—	—	
A Natural Disaster	Released: 3 November 2003; Label: Music For Nations	—	—	—	—	—	—	—	—	—	—	—	
Hindsight	Released: 11 August 2008; Label: Kscope Music	31	—	139	93	—	—	—	—	—	—	—	
We're Here Because We're Here	Released: 31 May 2010; Label: Kscope Music	19	50	69	52	6	—	—	—	—	—	—	
Falling Deeper	Released: 5 September 2011; Label: Kscope Music	37	—	122	44	—	—	—	—	—	—	168	
Weather Systems	Released: 16 April 2012; Label: Kscope Music	15	14	45	18	—	9	44	28	43	91	50	US: 2,300+
Distant Satellites	Released: 9 June 2014; Label: Kscope Music	13	18	64	12	—	9	42	—	42	77	33	US: 850+
The Optimist	Released: 9 June 2017; Label: Kscope Music	10	17	70	44	—	7	22	—	37	35	34	
"—" denotes a recording that did not chart or was not released in that territory.

=== Live albums ===
Title	Album details	Peak chart positions				
Title	Album details	FRA	NLD	BEL	GER	UK
Untouchable	Released: 15 July 2013; Label: Kscope Music	—	—	—	—	—
Universal	Released: 23 September 2013; Label: Kscope Music	111	53	92	66	81
A Sort of Homecoming	Released: 6 November 2015; Label: Kscope Music		36	154	65	
"—" denotes a recording that did not chart or was not released in that territory.

=== Compilation albums ===
Title	Album details	Peak chart positions			
Title	Album details	FIN	FRA	NLD	UK
Resonance	Released: 24 September 2001; Label: Peaceville Records	—	—	—	—
Resonance 2	Released: 30 April 2002; Label: Peaceville Records	—	—	—	—
Internal Landscapes 2008–2018	Released: 26 October 2018; Label: Kscope Music	—	198	—	—
"—" denotes a recording that did not chart or was not released in that territory.

== Extended plays ==
Title	Details
The Crestfallen	Released: 2 November 1992; Label: Peaceville Records
Pentecost III	Released: 24 April 1995; Label: Peaceville Records
Alternative Future	Released: 17 June 1998; Label: Peaceville Records

== Singles ==
Title	Year	Album
"They Die"	1992	The Crestfallen
"We Are the Bible"	1994	—
"Deep"	1999	Judgement
"Make it Right"	1999	Judgement
"Pressure"	2001	A Fine Day to Exit
"Unchained (Tales of the Unexpected)" / "Flying"	2008	Hindsight
"Dreaming Light"	2011	We're Here Because We're Here
"Everything"	2010	We're Here Because We're Here
"Untouchable, Pt. 2"	2013	Weather Systems

== Video albums ==
Title	Video details	Peak chart positions	
Title	Video details	FIN	NLD
A Vision of a Dying Embrace	Released: 1997; Label: Peaceville Records; Formats: VHS, DVD	—	—
Were You There?	Released: 15 November 2004; Label: Music For Nations; Formats: DVD	—	—
A Moment in Time	Released: 19 June 2006; Label: Metal Mind Productions; Formats: DVD	—	—
Universal	Released: 23 September 2013; Label: Kscope Music; Formats: Blu-ray, DVD	2	28
A Sort Of Homecoming	Released: 30 October 2015; Label: Kscope Music; Formats: Blu-ray, DVD	—	—
"—" denotes a recording that did not chart or was not released in that territory.

== Music videos ==
Year	Title	Director	Album
1993	"Sweet Tears"	—	Serenades
1994	"Mine Is Yours"	—	Pentecost III
1995	"The Silent Enigma"	—	The Silent Enigma
1996	"Hope"	—	Eternity
2001	"Pressure"	Dom Barringer	A Fine Day To Exit
2011	"Dreaming Light"	Christopher Kenworthy	We're Here Because We're Here
2012	"Untouchable, Part 1"	Lasse Hoile	Weather Systems
2017	"Can't Let Go"	Omeed Izadyar	The Optimist
