= Resonance (Anathema album) =

Compilation album by Anathema
- Released: 24 September 2001
- Genre: Gothic metal; alternative metal
- Length: 50:18
- Label: Peaceville Records

Anathema chronology
| Judgement (1999) | Resonance (2001) | A Fine Day to Exit (2001) |

Professional ratings
Review scores
| Source | Rating |
|---|---|
| AllMusic | 3/5 stars |

Resonance is a compilation album by the British rock band Anathema. It was released in 2001 as the first of two compilation albums featuring best-of as well as previously unreleased material, this one focusing on the band's softer music. It was followed by Resonance Vol. 2 in 2002.

== Track listing ==
| No. | Title | Original source | Length |
|---|---|---|---|
| 1. | "Scars of the Old Stream" | Serenades (1993) | 1:10 |
| 2. | "Everwake" | The Crestfallen EP (1992) | 2:39 |
| 3. | "J'ai Fait une Promesse" | Serenades | 2:39 |
| 4. | "Alone" | The Silent Enigma (1995) | 4:29 |
| 5. | "Far Away (acoustic)" | Eternity (1996) bonus track | 5:22 |
| 6. | "Eternity, Part II" | Eternity | 3:11 |
| 7. | "Eternity, Part III (acoustic)" | Eternity bonus track | 5:08 |
| 8. | "Better Off Dead" (Bad Religion cover from Stranger Than Fiction) | Peaceville X (1998) various artists compilation | 4:22 |
| 9. | "One of the Few" (Pink Floyd cover from The Final Cut) | Peaceville X (1998) various artists compilation | 1:50 |
| 10. | "Inner Silence" | Alternative 4 (1998) | 3:09 |
| 11. | "Goodbye Cruel World" (Pink Floyd cover from The Wall) | Peaceville X (1998) various artists compilation | 1:41 |
| 12. | "Destiny" | Alternative 4 | 2:14 |
| 13. | "The Silent Enigma (orchestral)" | The Silent Enigma bonus track | 4:14 |
| 14. | "Angelica (live Budapest 1997)" | Eternity bonus track | 6:58 |
| 15. | "Horses" | Pentecost III EP (1994) hidden track | 1:13 |
| Total length: | | | 50:18 |
