= Resonance 2 =

Resonance Vol. 2

Compilation album by Anathema
- Released: 30 April 2002
- Genres: Death/doom; gothic metal; alternative metal
- Length: 64:10
- Label: Peaceville Records

Anathema chronology
A Fine Day to Exit (2001)	Resonance Vol. 2 (2002)	A Natural Disaster (2003)

Resonance Volume 2 is a compilation album by the British rock band Anathema. It was released in 2002 as a follow-up to 2001's Resonance.

== Track listing ==
1. "Lovelorn Rhapsody" – 5:49 (from album Serenades)
2. "Sweet Tears" – 4:12 (from album Serenades)
3. "Sleepless 96" – 4:31 (1996 version, original from album Serenades)
4. "Eternal Rise of the Sun" – 6:34 (from album Serenades)
5. "Sunset of Age" – 6:55 (from album The Silent Enigma)
6. "Nocturnal Emission" – 4:18 (from album The Silent Enigma)
7. "A Dying Wish" – 8:12 (from album The Silent Enigma)
8. "Hope" – 5:54 (from album Eternity)
9. "Cries on the Wind" – 5:03 (from album Eternity)
10. "Fragile Dreams" – 5:32 (from album Alternative 4)
11. "Empty" – 3:00 (from album Alternative 4)
12. "Nailed to the Cross / 666" – 4:10 (from single We Are the Bible)
13. "Mine Is Yours" (video) (from ep Pentecost III)

== Notes ==
- The version of "Lovelorn Rhapsody" featured on this compilation is different from that of the Serenades performance and was originally exclusive to the Peaceville Volume 4 compilation.
