= The Optimist (Anathema album) =

Studio album by Anathema
- Released: 9 June 2017
- Studio: Attica Audio in County Donegal, Ireland; Castle of Doom studios in Glasgow
- Genre: Atmospheric rock; post-progressive
- Length: 56:27
- Label: Kscope
- Producer: Tony Doogan

Anathema chronology
Distant Satellites (2014)	The Optimist (2017)

The Optimist is the eleventh and final studio album by the British rock band Anathema. It was issued on 9 June 2017, through Kscope, three years after their last release, Distant Satellites. The idea for The Optimist originated from the cover artwork of the band's 2001 album, A Fine Day to Exit. The coordinates from the first track point to Silver Strand beach in San Diego County, California, which is shown on the cover of A Fine Day to Exit. The Optimist won Album of the Year at the 2017 Progressive Music Awards.

== Background ==
The album reportedly follows the concept of the band's 2001 release A Fine Day to Exit. According to band members Daniel and Vincent Cavanagh, the idea came from writing a narrative, culminating on what must have happened with the guy from that album cover. Vincent commented that "The guy who disappeared – you never knew what happened to him. Did he start a new life? Did he succumb to his fate? It was never explained. The opening track title is the exact coordinates for Silver Strand beach in San Diego – the last known location of The Optimist – shown on the cover of A Fine Day to Exit". The covers of both albums also show its narrative connections, as the former contains a car in an empty beach during the day, and the latter a car in a road at night.

== Critical reception ==
Professional ratings
Aggregate scores
Source	Rating
Metacritic	80/100
Review scores
Source	Rating
AllMusic	4.5/5 stars
Drowned in Sound	8/10
Kerrang	4/5 stars
PopMatters	8/10
Metal Hammer	4/5 stars
sputnikmusic	4/5 stars
The Skinny	2/5 stars

The album received positive reviews from music critics. At Metacritic, which assigns a normalized rating out of 100 to reviews from mainstream critics, the album received an average score of 80 based on eight reviews, indicating "generally favorable". Thom Jurek, reviewing for AllMusic, was highly positive about the release. He praised instrumental and vocal work on the album, as well the expansion of new elements in their music since the release of We're Here Because We're Here, "[...] widening a scope that would include more lush textures and atmospheres and result in some of their finest songs. Here Anathema have brought the experiments of the last seven years to a culmination of sorts." He then gave the album a score of 4 and a half starts out of 5. Jordan Blum of PopMatters was also very positive about the release, also praising the overall evolution of the band's sound, stating that "The Optimist isn't Anathema's finest effort yet, but again, that's more of a compliment to their other releases this decade than it is a knock against this one." He also cited the vocal duo of Vincent Cavanagh and Lee Douglas, the lyricism and the arrangements as highlights of the album, giving it a score of 8 out of 10. The diversity of elements, although praised by most reviewers, was criticized by some publishers. The Skinny's Pete Wild commented that, despite all the elements throughout their career, the band still failed to leave its mark on a mainstream audience. He concluded his review saying that it is an album for "our doomy times and is perhaps one best listened to at night, with a stiff drink in your hand and a serious expression on your face.", and gave it a score of 2 out of 5 stars.

=== Accolades ===
Best of the year (2017) lists
Publisher	Accolade	Rank
AXS TV	10 Best Rock Albums of 2017	1
Classic Rock	Top 50 Albums of 2017	5
Metal Hammer	Top 100 Albums of 2017	15
The Independent	Top 20 Rock and Metal Albums of 2017	19

== Track listing ==
No.	Title	Writer(s)	Length
1.	"32.63n 117.14w" (intro)	Daniel Cavanagh, Vincent Cavanagh, John Douglas	1:16
2.	"Leaving It Behind"	V. Cavanagh, J. Douglas	4:28
3.	"Endless Ways"	D. Cavanagh	5:49
4.	"The Optimist"	D. Cavanagh	5:37
5.	"San Francisco" (instrumental)	D. Cavanagh, V. Cavanagh	4:59
6.	"Springfield"	D. Cavanagh	5:49
7.	"Ghosts"	D. Cavanagh	4:17
8.	"Can't Let Go"	V. Cavanagh, J. Douglas	5:00
9.	"Close Your Eyes"	D. Cavanagh	3:38
10.	"Wildfires"	D. Cavanagh	5:39
11.	"Back to the Start" (the main song ends at around 7:30, and a hidden song begins after three minutes of silence.)	V. Cavanagh, J. Douglas	11:42
Total length:			58:14

Deluxe edition CD
No.	Title	Writer(s)	Length
1.	"Leaving It Behind" (demo)	V. Cavanagh, J. Douglas	4:43
2.	"The Optimist" (demo)	D. Cavanagh	3:52
3.	"Springfield" (live)	D. Cavanagh	4:52
4.	"Ghosts" (live)	D. Cavanagh	4:04
5.	"Can't Let Go" (live)	V. Cavanagh, J. Douglas	4:37
6.	"Wildfires" (demo)	D. Cavanagh	5:53
Total length:			28:01

== Personnel ==
- Lee Douglas – vocals
- Daniel Cavanagh – guitars, vocals, keyboards, bass
- Vincent Cavanagh – vocals, guitars, keyboards, programming, bass
- Jamie Cavanagh – bass
- John Douglas – drums, keyboards, programming
- Daniel Cardoso – drums

== Charts ==
Chart (2017)	Peak position
Austrian Albums (Ö3 Austria)	37
Belgian Albums (Ultratop Flanders)	44
Belgian Albums (Ultratop Wallonia)	53
Czech Albums (ČNS IFPI)	23
Dutch Albums (Album Top 100)	22
Finnish Albums (Suomen virallinen lista)	10
French Albums (SNEP)	70
German Albums (Offizielle Top 100)	17
Italian Albums (FIMI)	41
Polish Albums (ZPAV)	7
Portuguese Albums (AFP)	50
Scottish Albums (OCC)	27
Swiss Albums (Schweizer Hitparade)	35
UK Albums (OCC)	34
UK Album Downloads (OCC)	63
UK Independent Albums (OCC)	3
UK Rock & Metal Albums (OCC)	2
