= Falling Deeper =

Compilation album by Anathema
- Released: 5 September 2011
- Studios: Parr St Studios, Liverpool
- Label: Kscope
- Producers: Daniel Cavanagh, Vincent Cavanagh

Anathema chronology
| We're Here Because We're Here (2010) | Falling Deeper (2011) | Weather Systems (2012) |

Professional ratings
Review scores
| Source | Rating |
|---|---|
| Sputnikmusic | 2.5/5 stars |
| Allmusic | 2.5/5 stars |

Falling Deeper is an album of orchestral re-interpretations from British atmospheric rock band Anathema released on 5 September 2011. The album is a follow-up to 2008's Hindsight, for which the band recorded different versions of their past songs.

The album was produced by singer/guitarist Vincent Cavanagh and guitarist and main composer of the band Daniel Cavanagh who defines the record as “a nod to our past and a look to our future all at the same time, with a sound that is designed to transport you to the heart of the present moment.” The mixing was made by Andrea Wright at Parr Street Studios in Liverpool. The orchestral arrangements are composed by the band in collaboration with Dave Stewart who worked with Anathema on We're Here Because We're Here.

The songs received new musical and vocal arrangements with 'feedback' lead guitars centred on a grand piano and a rhythm section. Dutch singer Anneke van Giersbergen sings on "Everwake", a song originally released on the 1992 EP The Crestfallen, and on "...Alone".

== Track listing ==
Original writers of each songs, below

All lyrics are written by Darren White; all music is composed by Daniel Cavanagh, Vincent Cavanagh, John Douglas, Duncan Patterson and White, except where noted.

| No. | Title | Lyrics | Music | Length |
|---|---|---|---|---|
| 1. | "Crestfallen" (From EP The Crestfallen) | D. Cavanagh | | 3:07 |
| 2. | "Sleep in Sanity" (From album Serenades) | | | 3:54 |
| 3. | "Kingdom" (From EP Pentecost III) | | | 4:28 |
| 4. | "They Die" (From EP The Crestfallen) | | | 2:11 |
| 5. | "Everwake" (From EP The Crestfallen) | | | 3:09 |
| 6. | "J'ai Fait une Promesse" (From album Serenades) | | | 4:24 |
| 7. | "...Alone" (From album The Silent Enigma) | D. Cavanagh | D. Cavanagh, V. Cavanagh, Douglas, Patterson | 7:17 |
| 8. | "We, the Gods" (From EP Pentecost III) | | | 3:03 |
| 9. | "Sunset of Age" (From album The Silent Enigma) | Patterson, Vincent O'Connell | D. Cavanagh, V. Cavanagh, Douglas, Patterson | 7:41 |

== Credits ==
- Daniel Cavanagh – guitars
- Jamie Cavanagh – bass
- Vincent Cavanagh – vocals, guitars, keyboards
- John Douglas – drums
- Lee Douglas – vocals

Additional personnel

- Anneke van Giersbergen – vocals on "Everwake" and "...Alone"

== Charts ==
| Chart (2011) | Peak position |
|---|---|
| Dutch Albums (Album Top 100) | 44 |
| Finnish Albums (Suomen virallinen lista) | 37 |
| French Albums (SNEP) | 122 |
| German Albums (Offizielle Top 100) | 60 |
| UK Independent Albums (Official Charts) | 30 |
