= Distant Satellites =

Studio album by Anathema
- Released: 4 June 2014
- Recorded: Cederberg Studios, Oslo
- Genre: Progressive pop; art rock; progressive rock
- Length: 56:40
- Label: Kscope
- Producer: Christer-André Cederberg

Anathema chronology
Weather Systems (2012)	Distant Satellites (2014)	The Optimist (2017)

Singles from Distant Satellites

Distant Satellites (stylised as distant satellites) is the tenth studio album by the British rock band Anathema. It was released in June 2014 via Kscope and reached #33 in the UK album charts.

== Background and recording ==
The album was recorded at Cederberg Studios in Oslo, with producer Christer-André Cederberg, with some songs also mixed by Steven Wilson due to an operation on Cederberg's back.

The artwork was created by Korean new media artist Sang Jun Yoo, and based around his "Distant Light" installation.

The band released a statement on their new album prior to its release:

distant satellites is the culmination of everything ANATHEMA been working up to so far in our musical path. It contains almost every conceivable element of the heartbeat of Anathema music that it is possible to have. There is beauty, intensity, drama, quietude, and extra musical dimensions that the band have previously only hinted at. All built on the song writing chemistry of Daniel, John and Vincent - and the haunting voice of Lee Douglas.

This is the first album to feature Daniel Cardoso as the band's primary drummer, replacing longtime member John Douglas. Douglas has since moved to electronic percussion and keyboards.

== Critical reception ==
Professional ratings
Aggregate scores
Source	Rating
Metacritic	80/100
Review scores
Source	Rating
AllMusic	4/5 stars
Drowned in Sound	8/10
The Guardian	5/5 stars
PopMatters	6/10 stars
Sputnikmusic	3.7/5
Metalholic	9/10 stars

Distant Satellites received positive reviews from music critics. At Metacritic, which assigns a normalized rating out of 100 to reviews from mainstream critics, the album received an average score of 80 based on ten reviews, indicating "universal acclaim". The album ended the year at the 9th position of the 2014 Metal Hammer best albums list, as well at the 2nd position from Metal Hammer writer Adam Rees.

Despite a generally positive review, Sputnikmusic did lament the familiarity of it all stating, "Anathema stumbled onto musical gold when they crafted the formula used on We're Here Because We're Here. It's a formula they would be crazy to dismiss, and that's probably why they haven't... Overall, Anathema have struck gold for the third time in a row, but for the first time there are some prominent flaws as well."

== Track listing ==
All tracks are written by Daniel Cavanagh, except where noted.

No.	Title	Length
1.	"The Lost Song Part 1"	5:53
2.	"The Lost Song Part 2"	5:47
3.	"Dusk (Dark Is Descending)" (D. Cavanagh, Vincent Cavanagh)	5:59
4.	"Ariel"	6:28
5.	"The Lost Song Part 3"	5:21
6.	"Anathema"	6:40
7.	"You're Not Alone" (D. Cavanagh, Jamie Cavanagh, John Douglas, V. Cavanagh)	3:26
8.	"Firelight"	2:42
9.	"Distant Satellites" (Douglas, V. Cavanagh)	8:17
10.	"Take Shelter"	6:07
Total length:		56:40

== Singles ==
The Lost Song Part 3 Digital Single/EP

1. "The Lost Song Part 3" - 5:22
2. "Coda" (Non-album track) - 1:12
3. "The Lost Song Part 3 (Ambient Mix)" - 5:28

== Personnel ==
- Vincent Cavanagh – lead vocals, electric guitars, acoustic guitars, bass guitars, keyboards, programming, backing vocals
- John Douglas – electronic percussion, keyboards, programming
- Daniel Cavanagh – co-lead vocals, electric guitars, acoustic guitars, bass guitars, keyboards, piano
- Lee Douglas – lead and backing vocals
- Jamie Cavanagh – bass guitar
- Daniel Cardoso – drums

Guest musicians

- Christer-André Cederberg – bass guitar

Production

- Christer-André Cederberg – production, mixing
- Sigbjørn Grimsæth – assistant engineer
- Sang Jun Yoo – photography
- Chris Sansom – mastering
- Dave Stewart – string arrangements
- Steven Wilson – mixing on "You're Not Alone" and "Take Shelter"

== Charts ==
Chart (2014)	Peak position
Austrian Albums (Ö3 Austria)	42
Belgian Albums (Ultratop Flanders)	42
Belgian Albums (Ultratop Wallonia)	58
Dutch Albums (Album Top 100)	12
Finnish Albums (Suomen virallinen lista)	13
French Albums (SNEP)	64
German Albums (Offizielle Top 100)	18
Italian Albums (FIMI)	82
Polish Albums (ZPAV)	9
Scottish Albums (OCC)	39
Swiss Albums (Schweizer Hitparade)	77
UK Albums (OCC)	33
UK Independent Albums (OCC)	7
UK Rock & Metal Albums (OCC)	4
US Heatseekers Albums (Billboard)	9
US Top Hard Rock Albums (Billboard)	24

== Release history ==
Region	Date	Label
Japan	4 June 2014	Kscope
Germany	6 June 2014	Kscope
Sweden	6 June 2014	Kscope
Switzerland	6 June 2014	Kscope
United Kingdom	9 June 2014	Kscope
Canada	10 June 2014	Kscope
France	10 June 2014	Kscope
United States	10 June 2014	Kscope
