= Rise Pantheon Dreams =

Rise Pantheon Dream

Compilation album by The Blood Divine
- Released: 2002
- Genre: Gothic metal Doom metal
- Length: 55:50
- Label: Peaceville
- Producer: Peter Coleman, The Blood Divine

The Blood Divine chronology
Mystica (1997)	Rise Pantheon Dream (2002)

Rise Pantheon Dreams is a compilation album by the British gothic metal band The Blood Divine. It features tracks from both the band's albums Mystica and Awaken, plus some previously unreleased material.

The title was originally intended to be used by Anathema for the album that became The Silent Enigma after the departure of vocalist Darren White.

It was given a five out of ten rating by Chronicles of Chaos.

== Track listing ==
1. "Aureole" – 6:47
2. "Visions in Blue" – 4:31
3. "As Rapture Fades" – 3:24
4. "Revolt" – 1:31 (Previously unreleased)
5. "Wilderness" – 4:51
6. "Sensual Ecstasy" – 4:06
7. "Enchanted by Your Touch" – 1:56
8. "I Will Bleed" – 4:28
9. "The Passion Reigns" – 2:54
10. "Leaving Me Helpless" – 3:06
11. "Forever Belongs" – 1:52 (Previously unreleased)
12. "So Serene" – 9:20
13. "Crazy Horses" –- 2:21 (Live Osmonds cover)
14. "Aureole" – 4:43 (Live)

== Credits ==
- Darren White - Vocals
- Paul Allender - Guitars
- Paul Ryan - Guitars
- Benjamin Ryan - Keyboards
- Steve Maloney - Bass
- Was Sarginson - Drums, Percussion
