= Weather Systems (Anathema album) =

Studio album by Anathema
- Released: 16 April 2012
- Genre: Progressive rock; art rock; post-rock
- Length: 55:44
- Label: Kscope
- Producer: Christer-André Cederberg, Vincent Cavanagh, Daniel Cavanagh

Anathema chronology
| Falling Deeper (2011) | Weather Systems (2012) | Distant Satellites (2014) |

Singles from Weather Systems
- 1. "Untouchable, Part 2" Released: 17 September 2013

Weather Systems is the ninth album by the British rock band Anathema. It was released on 16 April 2012 in Europe via Kscope and 24 April 2012 in the US via The End Records. The band describes the album as "not background music for parties. The music is written to deeply move the listener". The album was recorded in Liverpool, North Wales and Oslo, each place significant to Anathema's past, present and future. The record was produced by band members Vincent Cavanagh and Daniel Cavanagh, as well as Christer-André Cederberg.

Recorded and released between the departure of Les Smith and the full-time joining of live member Daniel Cardoso, it is the first album of the band to not feature a full-time keyboardist since Judgement in 1999; instead, keyboard duties were shared between Vincent and Daniel Cavanagh, and drummer John Douglas. On future albums, Douglas would become the band's dedicated keyboardist, with Cardoso taking over as their primary drummer.

The album's official track list was announced on 2 February 2012.

== Reception ==
Professional ratings
Review scores
| Source | Rating |
|---|---|
| AllMusic | 4/5 stars |
| Terrorizer | 5/5 stars |

Terrorizer noted that the album had "a lot to live up to" following We're Here Because We're Here. The review noted that the songs on Weather Systems are "not instantaneous" as the previous album, but "its highlight is the way it decides to gently ebb from a dreamlike state in songs like 'The Beginning and the End' into the huge crescendo of 'The Lost Child' and elating release of 'Internal Landscapes'", and concluded that "Is it another masterpiece? Of course it is."

== Packaging ==
In the special edition, both discs come in a limited pressed hardcover digibook like their previous albums: Hindsight, We're Here Because We're Here, and Falling Deeper. Kscope store also has the standard jewel case edition with the album on CD format and no DVD. The American version of the album comes in a digisleeve.

The special edition DVD can only be found on the European pressing directly from Kscope. Also, the DVD features the album in 5.1 surround sound.

== Track listing ==
All tracks are written by Daniel Cavanagh, except "The Storm Before the Calm" by John Douglas.

| No. | Title | Lead vocals | Length |
|---|---|---|---|
| 1. | "Untouchable Part 1" | Vincent Cavanagh, Lee Douglas | 6:14 |
| 2. | "Untouchable Part 2" | V. Cavanagh, L. Douglas | 5:33 |
| 3. | "The Gathering of the Clouds" | V. Cavanagh, L. Douglas | 3:27 |
| 4. | "Lightning Song" | L. Douglas | 5:25 |
| 5. | "Sunlight" | D. Cavanagh | 4:55 |
| 6. | "The Storm Before the Calm" | V. Cavanagh, L. Douglas | 9:23 |
| 7. | "The Beginning and the End" | V. Cavanagh | 4:53 |
| 8. | "The Lost Child" | D. Cavanagh, V. Cavanagh | 7:02 |
| 9. | "Internal Landscapes" | V. Cavanagh, L. Douglas | 8:52 |
| Total length: | | | 55:44 |

== Singles ==
'Untouchable Part 1 Digital Single

1. "Untouchable Part 1" – 6:14

Untouchable Part 2 Digital Single

1. "Untouchable Part 2" – 5:33
2. "Untouchable Part 2" (Live) – 5:43
3. "Untouchable Part 2" (Live Video) – 5:43

== Personnel ==
- Daniel Cavanagh – lead vocals, electric guitar, acoustic guitar, bass guitar, keyboards, piano
- Jamie Cavanagh – bass guitars on "The Storm Before the Calm"
- Vincent Cavanagh – lead vocals, keyboards, programming, electric, acoustic and bass guitars on "The Storm Before the Calm", backing vocals on "Sunlight"
- John Douglas – drums, keyboards and programming on "The Storm Before the Calm"
- Lee Douglas – lead and backing vocals

Guest musicians

- Petter Carlsen – backing vocals on "Untouchable, Parts 1 and 2"
- Christer-André Cederberg – bass guitars, piano on "The Beginning and the End"
- Joe Geraci – Spoken word on "Internal Landscapes"
- Wetle Holte – drums on "Untouchable, Part 1" and "The Gathering of the Clouds"

Production

- Christer-André Cederberg, Vincent Cavanagh, Daniel Cavanagh – production

== Charts ==
| Chart (2012) | Peak position |
|---|---|
| Austrian Albums (Ö3 Austria) | 43 |
| Belgian Albums (Ultratop Flanders) | 53 |
| Belgian Albums (Ultratop Wallonia) | 44 |
| Dutch Albums (Album Top 100) | 18 |
| Finnish Albums (Suomen virallinen lista) | 15 |
| French Albums (SNEP) | 45 |
| German Albums (Offizielle Top 100) | 14 |
| Italian Albums (FIMI) | 46 |
| Norwegian Albums (VG-lista) | 28 |
| Polish Albums (ZPAV) | 9 |
| Scottish Albums (OCC) | 51 |
| Swiss Albums (Schweizer Hitparade) | 91 |
| UK Albums (OCC) | 50 |
| UK Independent Albums (OCC) | 10 |
| US Heatseekers Albums (Billboard) | 22 |
