= Untouchable =

Untouchable or Untouchables may refer to:

== People ==
- Nicolino Locche (1939–2005), Argentine boxer and light welterweight world champion nicknamed "The Untouchable"
- Untouchability, the practice of socially ostracizing a minority group of very low social status
- Untouchables, word for the Dalits or Scheduled Castes of India
- Untouchables (law enforcement), a 1930s American law enforcement unit led by Eliot Ness

== Films ==
- Untouchable, UK title of the French feature film The Intouchables (2011)
- Untouchable (2019 film), a documentary about the film producer Harvey Weinstein
- The Untouchable (film), a 2006 feature film directed by Benoît Jacquot
- The Untouchables (film), a 1987 feature film directed by Brian De Palma

== Books ==
- Untouchable (novel), a 1935 novel by Mulk Raj Anand
- The Untouchable (novel), a 1997 roman à clef by John Banville
- The Untouchables (book), a 1957 autobiography by Eliot Ness and Oscar Fraley
- The Untouchables (novel) (Slovenian: Nedotakljivi), a 2007 novel by Slovenian writer Feri Lainšček
- The Untouchables: Who Were They? And Why they Became Untouchables, a 1948 history book by B. R. Ambedkar

== Music ==
- Untouchable (band), a South Korean hip-hop duo
- The Untouchable, 1960s' all female U.S. band from Princeton, cited by Iggy Pop as an early influence on The Stooges (band)
- Untouchables (punk band), U.S. band from Washington D.C.
- The Untouchables (Los Angeles band), U.S. ska and soul band
- The Untouchables, an English progressive rock band formed by Adrian Smith
- The Untouchable Tour, by Meghan Trainor

=== Albums ===
- Untouchable (Anathema album), 2013
- Untouchable (Mac Mall album), 1996
- Untouchable, 2010 album by Before Their Eyes
- The Untouchable (album), a 1997 album by Scarface
- Untouchables (album), by Korn
- Untouchables, by Lakeside

=== Songs ===
- "Untouchable" (Girls Aloud song), 2008
- "Untouchable" (Tupac Shakur song), 2006
- "Untouchable" (Eminem song), by Eminem from Revival
- "Untouchable" (Itzy song), 2024
- "Untouchable" (Johnny Ruffo song), 2013
- "Untouchable", by Above the Law from Livin' Like Hustlers
- "Untouchable", by Atreyu from Baptize
- "Untouchable", by Big Time Rush from 24/Seven
- "Untouchable", by Garbage from Beautiful Garbage
- "Untouchable", by Luna Halo from Luna Halo
  - "Untouchable", a cover of the Luna Halo song by Taylor Swift from Fearless
    - "Untouchable (Taylor's Version)", a re-recorded version of Swift's cover from Fearless (Taylor's Version)
- "Untouchable", by Motionless in White from Graveyard Shift
- "Untouchable", a two-part song by Anathema from Weather Systems
- "Untouchable", by Ilse Delange from Next To Me
- "Untouchable", by YoungBoy Never Broke Again
- "Untouchables", by Toya from her 2001 self-titled album, Toya
- "Untouchables", by DJ Kay Slay from The Streetsweeper, Vol. 2
- "The Untouchables", by Kenny "Dope" Gonzalez
- "The Untouchables", by Frank Zappa from Broadway the Hard Way

== Television ==
- "Untouchable", 2017 TV series episode of The Flash (season 3)
- Untouchable (Japanese TV series), 2009 Japanese series
- Untouchable (South Korean TV series), 2017 South Korean series
- The Untouchables (1959 TV series), starring Robert Stack
- The Untouchables (1993 TV series), starring Tom Amandes
- "The Untouchables", a 1983 TV series episode, see list of The Professionals episodes

== Other uses ==
- DGUSA Untouchable, a wrestling pay-per-view event
- Untouchable, a Japanese manzai comedy duo and winners of the 2004 M-1 Grand Prix
- unTouchable, a webtoon by massstar
- The Untouchable, a 2000 video game developed by Global Star Software
- The Untouchables (video game), video game based on the 1987 film
- The Untouchables (wrestling), the tag team Deuce 'n Domino
- Untouchables, a fictional organization in comic books, see list of DC Comics teams and organizations

== See also ==
- Nicky Barnes (1933–2012), American former gang leader turned informant nicknamed "Mr. Untouchable"
- Intouchable, French hip hop / rap band
