= Weather systems (disambiguation) =

Weather systems are patterns of weather.

Weather systems may also refer to:

- Weather Systems (Anathema album)
- Weather Systems (Andrew Bird album)
- A band led by former Anathema guitarist Daniel Cavanagh
