= The Silent Enigma =

Studio album by Anathema
- Released: 6 November 1995
- Recorded: May–June 1995 at Lynx Studios, Newcastle, except "...Alone" (recorded at M. A. Studios, Liverpool)
- Genres: Death-doom; gothic metal
- Length: 54:37
- Label: Peaceville
- Producers: Anathema, Kevin Ridley

Anathema chronology
Pentecost III (1995)	The Silent Enigma (1995)	Eternity (1996)

The Silent Enigma is the second album by British rock band Anathema, released in 1995 through Peaceville Records.

== Recording and legacy ==
Professional ratings
Review scores
Source	Rating
AllMusic	3/5 stars
Sputnikmusic	2.5/5 stars
Metal Storm	9.5/10 stars

The Silent Enigma represents a turning point in Anathema's career (it is the first album to feature guitarist Vincent Cavanagh singing lead vocals, replacing Darren White) and sees the band incorporating more clean vocals and melodic elements, while still retaining the band's early death-doom style. The album was originally titled Rise Pantheon Dreams, a title later used by White for his post-Anathema project The Blood Divine.

Where Darren's vocals were more guttural, Vincent's newer style pushed the possibilities for Anathema onwards and upwards, with a scope and breath beyond his years. Lauded by the metal press, the album has since been described by Terrorizer magazine as "one of Anathema's best". The special edition of the album also features two bonus tracks.

Orchestral versions of "...Alone" and "Sunset of Age" were recorded for the 2011 compilation Falling Deeper.

== Track listing ==
All songs written by Anathema.

No.	Title	Lyrics	Music	Length
1.	"Restless Oblivion"	Duncan Patterson	Daniel Cavanagh, Patterson, Vincent Cavanagh	8:03
2.	"Shroud of Frost"	V. Cavanagh, Derek Fullwood	D. Cavanagh	7:31
3.	"...Alone"	D. Cavanagh	D. Cavanagh, Patterson	4:24
4.	"Sunset of Age"	Vincent O'Connel	D. Cavanagh	6:57
5.	"Nocturnal Emission"	Fullwood	Patterson, D. Cavanagh	4:20
6.	"Cerulean Twilight"	John Douglas	Douglas	7:05
7.	"The Silent Enigma"	O'Connel	D. Cavanagh	4:25
8.	"A Dying Wish"	Patterson	Patterson, D. Cavanagh	8:12
9.	"Black Orchid"	Patterson	Patterson	3:40
Total length:				54:37

=== 2003 remastered release ===
A remastered version of The Silent Enigma was released on 2003 by Peaceville Records. The 2-disc package features the entire The Silent Enigma album fully re-mastered on CD, along with a DVD featuring a live performance recorded in Kraków, Poland, in March 1996, as well as promotional videos for the tracks "Sweet Tears", "Mine Is Yours to Drown In (Ours Is the New Tribe)", "The Silent Enigma", and "Hope".

2003 re-release bonus tracks
No.	Title	Lyrics	Music	Length
10.	"The Silent Enigma (Orchestral)"	--	D. Cavanaugh	4:12
11.	"Sleepless 96"	Darren White	D. Cavanaugh	4:31
Total length:				63:20

==== DVD ====
Promotional Videos

1. "Sweet Tears"
2. "Mine Is Yours"
3. "The Silent Enigma"
4. "Hope"

Live (Krakow 1.3.96)

1. "Intro"
2. "Restless Oblivion"
3. "Shroud of Frost"
4. "We the Gods"
5. "Sunset of Age"
6. "Mine Is Yours"
7. "Sleepless"
8. "The Silent Enigma"
9. "A Dying Wish"

== Personnel ==
- Vincent Cavanagh – vocals, guitars
- John Douglas – drums, percussion
- Duncan Patterson – bass
- Danny Cavanagh – guitars

Guest musicians

- Derek Fullwood – spoken word on "Shroud of Frost"
- Rebecca Wilson – female vocals on "...Alone"

Production

- Meany – photography (band)
- Simon Mooney – photography
- Danny Cavanagh – orchestral arrangements
- Mags – mixing
- Hammy – executive producer
- Kev Ridley – engineering
- Joseph Wright of Derby – cover art. "Lady in Milton's Comus", 1785
