= Mystica =

Mystica may refer to:

- Mystica (Axel Rudi Pell album), 2006
- Mystica (The Blood Divine album), 1997
- Mystica (band), a Goa trance project from Israel
