= Les Smith =

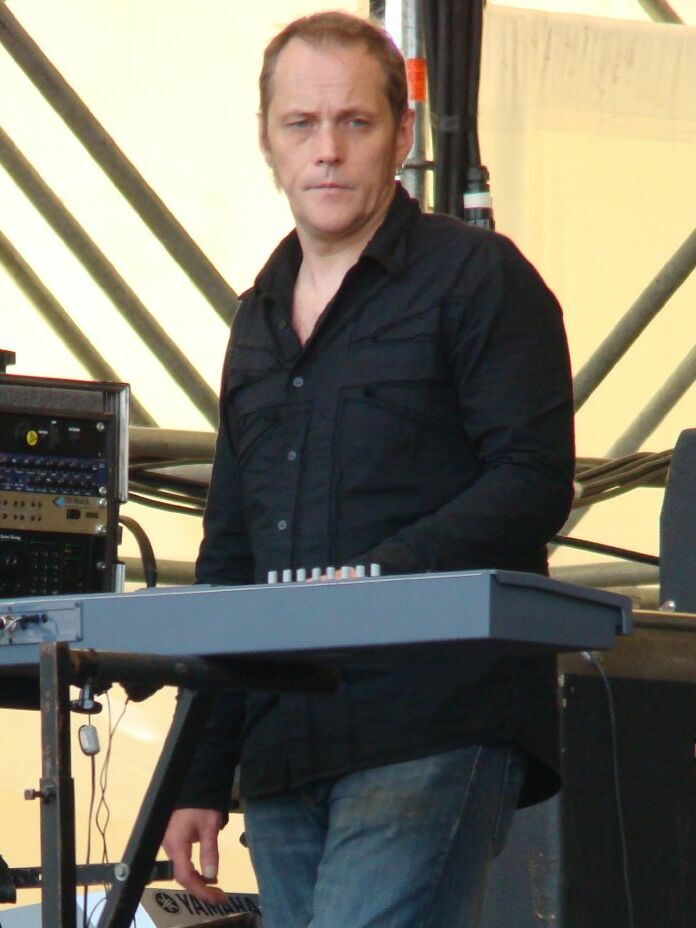
- Les Smith live with Anathema

Background information
- Also known as: Les, Lecter
- Born: 5 May 1967 (age 58); Dewsbury, West Yorkshire, England
- Genres: Death/doom, extreme metal, progressive rock
- Occupation: Musician
- Instrument: Keyboards
- Years active: 1994–2011

Keith Leslie Smith is a former English keyboardist, once in the bands Anathema (1996, 2001–2011) and Cradle of Filth (1998–2000).

== Biography ==
He was born in 1967 in Dewsbury, West Yorkshire, England. Smith undertook session work on keyboards for the English band Anathema on their album Eternity, released in 1996. During his time in Cradle of Filth, his stage persona consisted of wearing a custom Vicar Priest top, black leather trousers and goth make-up. He played keyboards in two of Cradle's releases: Cruelty and the Beast and From the Cradle to Enslave.

Smith was a session musician of the band Tourettes. Post-Cradle of Filth, he accused vocalist Dani Filth of considering it his own solo project ("Dani and the Filths" he jokes). However, they are on good terms these days.

Smith had a tenure with Anathema, but on their official site it was announced that he quit on 13 September 2011 due to "creative and musical differences".

== Discography ==
=== Anathema ===
- Eternity (1996)
- Pressure (2001)
- A Fine Day to Exit (2001) also programming & engineering as "Les"
- A Natural Disaster (2003) also programming & engineering "Les"
- Were You There? (2004) also production & mixing (1–16)
- A Moment in Time (2006)
- Hindsight (2008) also engineering & mixing
- We're Here Because We're Here (2010)
- Everything (2010)
- Dreaming Light (2011)

=== Cradle of Filth ===
(as "Lecter")

- Cruelty and the Beast (1998)
- Twisted Nails of Faith (1998)
- PanDaemonAeon (1999)
- From the Cradle to Enslave (1999)

==== Guest ====
- Subvert (2002) – Pain Control
- In the Big Ending... (2004) – The Clan Destined
- Blood on Snow (2010) – Eastern Front
