= Serrated Smile =

Studio album by G.G.F.H.
- Released: 2005
- Genre: Industrial techno
- Length: 1:06:57
- Label: Little Missy Recordings
- Producer: Ghost (Michael Geist)

G.G.F.H. chronology
The Very Beast of G.G.F.H. Vol. 1 (2001)	Serrated Smile (2005)

Serrated Smile is the third studio album by the industrial/techno band G.G.F.H. It was originally released on Halloween 2005 as a limited edition CD of 500 copies, but was later made available to the public for download through Ghost’s website. The album is darker and more beat-driven compared to previously released material, as the original guitarist, Brian J. Walls, had left the band, resulting in a change of sound. The album was originally to be released on Earache Records, but that did not work out, and it was instead self released on Little Missy Recordings.

== Track listing ==
1. "Intro" (3:16)
2. "Serrated Smile" (4:22)
3. "Skarz" (5:41)
4. "Genosside" (4:48)
5. "Mobilemethlab (MML)" (5:42)
6. "High Way" (1:02)
7. "Konform" (4:36)
8. "Guilty" (6:05)
9. "Grinder" (5:31)
10. "2Haven2Hold" (4:39)
11. "Hungry" (3:30)
12. "Bull*Hit" (5:44)
13. "Nineoneone" (3:14)
14. "Stay Sick..." (0:11)
15. "W.O.T. End" (20:00)

== Personnel ==
- Ghost (Michael Geist) - Vocals/Programming
