= The Very Beast of G.G.F.H. Vol. 1 =

The Very Beast Of G.G.F.H. Vol. 1

Greatest hits album by G.G.F.H.
- Released: 2001
- Genre: Industrial
- Length: 45:40
- Label: Peaceville

G.G.F.H. chronology
Halloween (1994)	The Very Beast Of G.G.F.H. Vol. 1 (2001)	Serrated Smile (2005)

The Very Beast Of G.G.F.H. Vol. 1 is a compilation album by the industrial techno band G.G.F.H. This album is a CD only compilation of tracks from their back catalogue. The only track that is new is Bullet, which was recorded by DJ Ghost as a taster for an album that did not happen, as dealings with Peaceville Records fell through. A second volume was never made, although DJ Ghost himself has stated that he owns the master copy and it may yet see the light of day.

== Track listing ==
1. "Flesh" (5:16)
2. "Acid" (2:07)
3. "Bullet (2001 Version)" (6:31)
4. "Eclipse" (3:17)
5. "Room 213 (Frozen Heart Mix)" (4:25)
6. "Welcome To The Process" (4:45)
7. "Night Prowler" (3:17)
8. "Hoe Or Die (’87 Demo)" (2:57)
9. "Dead Men Don’t Rape (Revenge Mix)" (4:22)
10. "Fiending Corpse" (3:55)
11. "Nothing Left Inside" (4:20)

This CD also includes the video for Real

== Personnel ==
- DJ Ghost (a.k.a. Michael Geist) - Vocals/Programming
- Brian J. Walls - Guitars/Synths
