= Judgement (Anathema album) =

Studio album by Anathema
- Released: 21 June 1999
- Recorded: 1998–1999, at Damage inc. Studios, Ventimiglia, Italy
- Genre: Alternative rock; hard rock; gothic metal
- Length: 56:56
- Label: Music for Nations
- Producer: Kit Woolven

Anathema chronology
Alternative 4 (1998)	Judgement (1999)	Resonance (2001)

Singles from Judgement
- 1. "Deep" Released: 1999; 2. "Make It Right" Released: 1999

Judgement is the fifth album by the British rock band Anathema. It was released in June 1999 through Music for Nations.

== Background ==
Professional ratings
Review scores
Source	Rating
AllMusic	4/5 stars
Sputnikmusic	5/5 stars
Silencio Hungary	4.5/5 stars

The first album with Dave Pybus joining the band to replace bassist and co-principal songwriter Duncan Patterson. Danny Cavanagh now taking on a larger share of the songwriting duties to compensate for Patterson's departure. It is also the band's first album featuring original drummer John Douglas since his return in 1998. John's sister Lee appears for the first time on this album, albeit in a guest role. She would later become the band's third lead vocalist.

== Track listing ==
No.	Title	Lyrics	Music	Length
1.	"Deep"	Vincent Cavanagh	Daniel Cavanagh, Dave Pybus	4:53
2.	"Pitiless"	V. Cavanagh, John Douglas, Pybus	D. Cavanagh	3:11
3.	"Forgotten Hopes"	D. Cavanagh	D. Cavanagh	3:50
4.	"Destiny Is Dead"	--	D. Cavanagh, Pybus	1:47
5.	"Make It Right (F.F.S.)"	Douglas	Douglas	4:19
6.	"One Last Goodbye"	D. Cavanagh	D. Cavanagh	5:24
7.	"Parisienne Moonlight"	D. Cavanagh	D. Cavanagh	2:10
8.	"Judgement"	D. Cavanagh, V. Cavanagh	D. Cavanagh, Douglas	4:20
9.	"Don't Look Too Far"	Douglas	Douglas	4:57
10.	"Emotional Winter"	V. Cavanagh	D. Cavanagh	5:54
11.	"Wings of God"	Douglas	Douglas	6:29
12.	"Anyone, Anywhere"	Pybus	Pybus, D. Cavanagh	4:51
13.	"2000 & Gone"	--	Pybus, D. Cavanagh	4:51
Total length:				56:56

Digipack edition bonus track
No.	Title	Lyrics	Music	Length
14.	"Transacoustic"	--	D. Cavanagh	3:49
Total length:				60:45

== Personnel ==
- Vincent Cavanagh – vocals, guitars
- John Douglas – drums
- Dave Pybus – bass
- Danny Cavanagh – guitars, keyboards, vocals on "Parisienne Moonlight"

Guest musicians

- Dario Patti – piano on "Anyone, Anywhere"
- Lee Douglas – female vocals on "Parisienne Moonlight" and "Don't Look Too Far"

Production

- Darren J. White – photography
- Mez – layout
- Dario (Ki-Nell) Mollo – engineering assistant, band photography
- Kit Woolven – producer, engineering
- Rog Sargent – photography

== Notes ==
"One Last Goodbye" is dedicated to Helen Cavanagh (1949–1998), mother of the Cavanagh brothers.

== Charts ==
Chart (1999)	Peak position
German Albums (Offizielle Top 100)	69
UK Albums (OCC)	151
