= The Crestfallen =

EP by Anathema
- Released: 2 November 1992
- Recorded: June–July 1992, at Academy Studios, Yorkshire
- Genre: Death-doom
- Length: 33:26
- Label: Peaceville Records
- Producer: Anathema

Anathema chronology
The Crestfallen (1992)	Serenades (1993)

Singles from The Crestfallen
- 1. "They Die" Released: 1992

Professional ratings
Review scores
Source	Rating
Sputnikmusic	2/5 stars

The Crestfallen is a demo EP by the British rock band Anathema.

== Release ==
It was the first official release in Anathema's discography. "They Die" was not included on the vinyl version.

In 1994, The Futurist Label included all of the tracks as part of the band's first album Serenades. The following year, Peaceville released the EP as a double CD with Serenades.> In 2001, it was re-issued together with Pentecost III on one disc.

Orchestral versions of "Crestfallen", "They Die" and "Everwake" were recorded for the 2011 compilation Falling Deeper.

== Track listing ==
All lyrics written by White (except track 4, lyrics written by D. Cavanagh), all music written by Anathema.

No.	Title	Length
1.	"...And I Lust"	5:47
2.	"The Sweet Suffering"	6:42
3.	"Everwake"	2:41
4.	"Crestfallen"	10:17
5.	"They Die"	7:59
Total length:		33:26

== Credits ==
- Darren White — vocals
- Daniel Cavanagh — lead guitar
- Vincent Cavanagh — rhythm guitar
- John Douglas — drums
- Duncan Patterson — bass guitar

Additional personnel

- Ruth Wilson — vocals on "Everwake"
