= Hindsight (Anathema album) =

Studio album of re-recorded songs by Anathema
- Released: Download: 11 August 2008; US: 19 August 2008; UK: 25 August 2008
- Length: 52:44
- Label: Peaceville/Kscope
- Producer: Anathema

Anathema chronology
A Natural Disaster (2003)	Hindsight (2008)	We're Here Because We're Here (2010)

Singles from Hindsight
- 1. "Unchained (Tales of the Unexpected)" / "Flying" Released: 2008

Professional ratings
Review scores
Source	Rating
Aquarian Weekly	(A+)
AllMusic	3.5/5 stars

Hindsight is an acoustically oriented studio album by British progressive rock band Anathema consisting of re-recorded versions of some of the band's classic songs with the addition of one new song, "Unchained (Tales of the Unexpected)". The title for the album was originally intended to be Temporary Peace.

This album also features cello playing of Dave Wesling from the Royal Liverpool Philharmonic Orchestra. A close friend of the band, Dave previously toured with the band in 2004 and is featured on the DVD A Moment in Time. The record was arranged, recorded, performed and produced solely by the band. Kscope label launched a Hindsight mini-site, available in three languages—English, Italian and French—from where the song "Fragile Dreams" can be downloaded for free in MP3 format if subscribing to a mailing list. The mini-site also contains streaming previews of "Inner Silence", "Are You There?" and "Angelica".

== Track listing ==
1. "Fragile Dreams" - 5:30 (from album Alternative 4)
2. "Leave No Trace" - 4:52 (from album A Fine Day to Exit)
3. "Inner Silence" - 3:40 (from album Alternative 4)
4. "One Last Goodbye" - 6:03 (from album Judgement)
5. "Are You There?" - 5:18 (from album A Natural Disaster)
6. "Angelica" - 5:00 (from album Eternity)
7. "A Natural Disaster" - 6:20 (from album A Natural Disaster)
8. "Temporary Peace" - 5:10 (from album A Fine Day to Exit)
9. "Flying" - 6:27 (from album A Natural Disaster)
10. "Unchained (Tales of the Unexpected)" - 4:18 (previously unreleased)

== Charts ==
Chart (2008)	Peak position
Dutch Albums (Album Top 100)	93
Finnish Albums (Suomen virallinen lista)	31
French Albums (SNEP)	139
