= G.G.F.H. =

American industrial music band

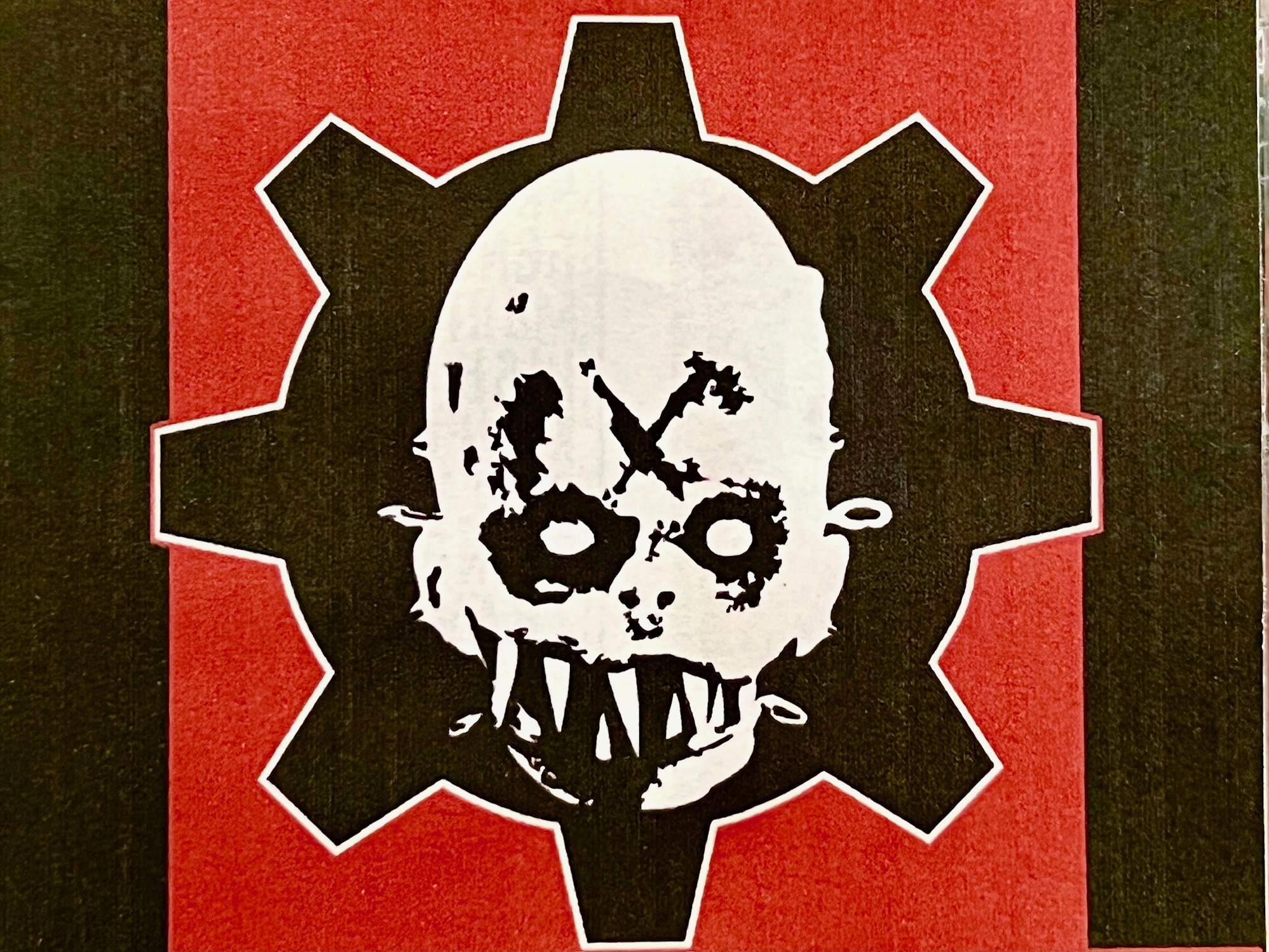

Background information
- Origin: Oakland, California United States
- Genres: Industrial
- Years active: 1986–present
- Labels: Peaceville, Dreamtime, Little Missy Recordings
- Members: Ghost (Michael Geist); Hex
- Past members: Brian J. Walls (1992–1998)
- Website: Ggfh.com

G.G.F.H. (Global Genocide Forget Heaven) is an American industrial music band from Oakland, California, United States. The band's musical inspiration derives from lyrical concepts such as death, murder, religion, drug abuse, rape, sex, and mental illness. They have received critical acclaim from Kerrang! and Terrorizer magazines.

== History ==
Michael Geist, also known as Ghost or DJ Ghost, formed G.G.F.H. in 1986, although he had been creating music since 1984. Their moniker originally stood for Goat Guys from Hell or Gore Gods From Hell, but Ghost finally settled on Global Genocide Forget Heaven. After releasing seven demo tapes and playing the occasional live show, Brian J. Walls joined the band and the duo were eventually signed to Peaceville Records' then new subsidiary label for experimental bands, Dreamtime, in 1991. Their first official release was Eclipse, which was used to help launch the new subsidiary label. This was followed a year later by the EP, "Reality".

1993 saw the release of the Disease album, which took a more techno direction than their previous releases. G.G.F.H. toured Europe briefly supporting metal bands such as Fear Factory and My Dying Bride. Their shows were memorable for the TVs on the stage flickering images of war, porn and autopsy footage. Ghost would have a bucket of fake blood which he would dip a Little Missy doll into and then flick around the front of the stage onto the audience. When the band was supposed to tour with My Dying Bride, Ghost was arrested at the airport for carrying illegal goods in his luggage, namely various stage props. Loz, who was a roadie for G.G.F.H., had to take over vocal duties, and at one point he was on his own as Brian J. Walls had been hospitalized.

Ghost also made a guest appearance on My Dying Bride's I Am the Bloody Earth EP in 1994, a year which also saw the release of Halloween, a compilation of early demo tracks, and the limited edition, green vinyl single, "Welcome to the Process/Too Much Punch". A year later, Brian J. Walls left the band to pursue other interests including web design and the contract with Peaceville Records had expired.

Over the next 10 years, Ghost started a graphic design company and gained notoriety as a DJ in various parts of America, and G.G.F.H. was put on hold. However, after the release of The Very Beast of G.G.F.H. Vol. 1 in 2001, Ghost decided to write new G.G.F.H. material. With the absence of Brian J. Walls, the band's main songwriter, Ghost looked to a handful of contributors to help write it. Their latest album, titled Serrated Smile, was released in 2005. In 2023 they announced they were working on new material and made numerous early recordings available via bandcammp, and in 2024 a new track titled Reliks was released via bandcamp.

== Discography ==
=== Albums ===
- Eclipse (LP/CD) (1991)
- Disease (LP/CD) (1993)
- Serrated Smile (CD/DL) (2005)

=== Singles and EPs ===
- Reality EP (12"/CD single) (1992)
- "Welcome to the Process/Too Much Punch" (7") (1994)
- Reliks (Digital) (2024)

=== Demos ===
- Hoe or Die (cassette)
- Gates of Hell (cassette)
- Matter of Principal (cassette)
- Necrophilia Banned (cassette)
- Sick Revenge (cassette)
- Love Is Freed (cassette)
- Eclipse (cassette)

=== Compilations ===
- Halloween (cassette/CD) (1994)
- The Very Beast of G.G.F.H. Vol. 1 (CD) (2001)
- The Cruelest Animal (CD) (2003), self-released

=== Compilation appearances ===
- Peaceville Volume 4 - "Room 213 (Mix)" (CD) (1992)
- Broaden Your Horizons - "Disease" (cassette) (1993)
- Head Your Mind - "Flesh (Mix)", "Spirits" (cassette/CD) (1993)
- No Peace at All - "Hands" (CD) (1993)
- Peaceville Classic Cuts - "Dead Men Don't Rape" (CD) (2001)
