= Disease (G.G.F.H. album) =

Studio album by G.G.F.H.
- Released: 1993
- Genre: Industrial; Techno; Dark electro
- Length: 53:39
- Label: Dreamtime

G.G.F.H. chronology
| Eclipse (1991) | Disease (1993) | Halloween (1994) |

Disease is the second studio album by the industrial/horror techno band G.G.F.H. This album saw the band take a more techno approach, pushing aside the sludgier sound of their earlier material. The album features three of the tracks recorded for the Reality EP, (Room 213, Dead Men Don’t Rape, Real), in a slightly different form.

== Track listing ==
1. "Flesh" - 5:17
2. "Room 213 (Frozen Heart Mix)" - 4:26
3. "Hands" - 4:07
4. "Dead Men Don’t Rape (Revenge Mix)" - 4:23
5. "Disease" - 6:52
6. "Real (Nightmare Mix)" - 3:32
7. "Dark Powers" - 4:51
8. "Plasterchrist" - 4:52
9. "Confession" (The song "Confession" ends at minute 1:07. After 11 minutes of silence [1:07 - 12:07], begins an untitled hidden track.) - 15:15

== Personnel ==
- Ghost (Michael Geist) - Vocals/Programming
- Brian J. Walls - Guitar/Synths
