= A Natural Disaster =

Studio album by Anathema
- Released: 3 November 2003
- Recorded: July–August 2003
- Studios: Parkgate Studios, Battle, East Sussex, UK
- Genres: Alternative rock; progressive rock
- Length: 55:23
- Label: Music for Nations
- Producers: Anathema, Dan Turner

Anathema chronology
Resonance 2 (2002)	A Natural Disaster (2003)	Hindsight (2008)

A Natural Disaster is the seventh album by the British rock band Anathema. It was released on 3 November 2003 in the United Kingdom and on 24 February 2004 in the United States through Music for Nations.

== Background ==
This is the first album to feature the band's original bassist Jamie Cavanagh, brother of Daniel and twin to Vincent, who returned in 2001 having left in 1991 prior to any major releases.

== Track listing ==
Professional ratings
Review scores
Source	Rating
AllMusic	4/5 stars
Silencio Hungary	5/5 stars
Chronicles of Chaos	8/10 stars

All tracks are written by Daniel Cavanagh, except where noted.

No.	Title	Length
1.	"Harmonium"	5:28
2.	"Balance" (D. Cavanagh, Vincent Cavanagh, John Douglas)	3:59
3.	"Closer"	6:20
4.	"Are You There?"	4:59
5.	"Childhood Dream"	2:11
6.	"Pulled Under at 2000 Metres a Second"	5:23
7.	"A Natural Disaster"	6:28
8.	"Flying"	5:57
9.	"Electricity"	3:52
10.	"Violence"	10:46
Total length:		55:23

== Personnel ==
=== Band members ===
- Vincent Cavanagh – vocals, guitars, vocoder
- John Douglas – drums
- Les Smith – keyboards, programming
- Jamie Cavanagh – bass, programming
- Danny Cavanagh – guitars, keyboards, vocals on "Are You There?" and "Electricity"

=== Guest musicians ===
- Anna Livingstone – additional vocals on "Are You There?"
- Lee Douglas – lead vocals on "A Natural Disaster"

=== Production ===
- Travis Smith – artwork
- Les Smith – engineering
- Dan Turner – producer, engineering
- Nick Griffiths – engineering assistant
