= Untouchable (Anathema album) =

Live album by Anathema
- Released: 24 June 2013
- Genre: Progressive rock, new prog

Untouchable is a live album by English progressive rock band Anathema released on 24 June in double vinyl format. It was scheduled to be released in its audio visual CD/DVD version in August 2013.

"In May 2012 Anathema released Weather Systems, the most successful album of the band's two decade plus career. Scoring high in end of year polls around the world, the album cemented Anathema's reputation as one of the most interesting bands of recent times. Following the release of the album, the band embarked on a lengthy world tour. The European part of the tour opened with a special one-off gig at the ancient Roman theatre of Philippopolis where the band were joined by the Plovdiv Philharmonic Orchestra. Untouchable captures the magic of this unique evening."

== Track listing ==
No.	Title	Length
1.	"Untouchable, Part 1"	7:07
2.	"Untouchable, Part 2"	5:55
3.	"Thin Air"	5:58
4.	"Dreaming Light"	5:58
5.	"Everything"	5:39
6.	"The Storm Before the Calm"	9:24
7.	"A Simple Mistake"	8:33
8.	"The Beginning And The End"	4:41
9.	"Universal"	7:31
10.	"Closer"	6:28
11.	"A Natural Disaster"	6:38
12.	"Flying"	8:23
