= Halloween (G.G.F.H. album) =

Compilation album by G.G.F.H.
- Released: 1994
- Recorded: 1986–1989
- Genre: Industrial
- Length: mm:ss
- Label: Dreamtime
- Producer: Ghost (Michael Geist)

G.G.F.H. chronology
| Disease (1993) | Halloween (1994) | The Very Beast of G.G.F.H. Vol. 1 (2001) |

Halloween is a compilation album by the industrial band G.G.F.H. It is a CD-only compilation of tracks that were previously available on a 1991 cassette release, also called Halloween, that was limited to 1000 copies. It comprises tracks recorded between 1986 and 1989. It was released after fans that had missed the original cassette version demanded to hear it. "Night Prowler" is an industrialized remix of a song by AC/DC.

== Track listing ==
1. "Little Missy" (5:55)
2. "Blood Is Thicker" (3:38)
3. "Chainsaw" (5:16)
4. "She Comes to You" (3:49)
5. "Curiosity Killed the Cat" (4:00)
6. "Thorns" (8:16)
7. "Night Prowler" (3:17)
8. "As I Touch You" (5:38)
9. "Plasterchrist ‘88" (12:08)
10. "Ireland" (4:31)
11. "Fetal Infection" (7:15)
12. "Dread" (1:06)
13. "Missy ‘84" (0:51)
14. "Go Away" (2:30)
15. "Missy’s Revenge" (4:55)

== Personnel ==
- Ghost (Michael Geist) - vocals/programming
