= Serenades (album) =

Studio album by Anathema
- Released: 15 February 1993
- Recorded: June–September 1992
- Studio: Academy Studios, Yorkshire
- Genre: Death-doom
- Length: 65:45
- Language: English; French
- Label: Peaceville; The Futurist Label (US release)
- Producer: Anathema, Paul "Hammy" Halmshaw

Anathema chronology
The Crestfallen (1992)	Serenades (1993)	Pentecost III (1995)

Serenades is the full-length debut album by British rock band Anathema. It was released in February 1993 through Peaceville Records.

It is their only album to feature Darren White on lead vocals. Rhythm guitarist Vincent Cavanagh sang lead on all subsequent albums.

== Background ==
Professional ratings
Review scores
Source	Rating
AllMusic	2.5/5 stars
Sputnikmusic	4.5/5 stars
Silencio Hungary	3/5 stars

Serenades expands on material from The Crestfallen EP, but features more experimentation and variation throughout. It was recorded between June and September 1992 at Yorkshire-based Academy Studios, the same place where The Crestfallen had been recorded one year prior.

== Composition ==
Serenades is mainly a death-doom album. Lyrical themes include being lovelorn ("Lovelorn Rhapsody"), trauma and war ("Sleepless") and lust ("Under a Veil [Of Black Lace]"). The album closes with a 23-minute ambient track.

== Track listing ==
All lyrics written by Darren J. White, all music written by Danny Cavanagh.

Original 1993 release
No.	Title	Length
1.	"Lovelorn Rhapsody"	6:25
2.	"Sweet Tears"	4:14
3.	"J'ai fait une promesse" "I Made a Promise"	2:40
4.	"They (Will Always) Die"	7:16
5.	"Sleepless"	4:12
6.	"Sleep in Sanity"	6:53
7.	"Scars of the Old Stream"	1:10
8.	"Under a Veil (of Black Lace)"	7:34
9.	"Where Shadows Dance"	1:58
10.	"Dreaming: The Romance"	23:23
Total length:		65:45

1994 US version
No.	Title	Length
1.	"Lovelorn Rhapsody"	6:25
2.	"Sweet Tears"	4:14
3.	"J'ai fait une promesse"	2:40
4.	"They (Will Always) Die"	7:16
5.	"Sleepless"	4:12
6.	"Sleep in Sanity"	6:53
7.	"Scars of the Old Stream"	1:10
8.	"Under a Veil (of Black Lace)"	7:34
9.	"Where Shadows Dance"	1:58
10.	"All Faith is Lost" (bonus track)	8:02
11.	"...And I Lust (from The Crestfallen EP)" (bonus track)	5:46
12.	"The Sweet Suffering (from The Crestfallen EP)" (bonus track)	6:41
13.	"Everwake (from The Crestfallen EP)" (bonus track)	2:41
14.	"Crestfallen (from The Crestfallen EP)" (bonus track)	10:14
Total length:		75:46

2003 remastered version
No.	Title	Length
1.	"Lovelorn Rhapsody"	6:25
2.	"Sweet Tears"	4:14
3.	"J'ai fait une promesse"	2:40
4.	"They (Will Always) Die"	7:16
5.	"Sleepless"	4:12
6.	"Sleep in Sanity"	6:53
7.	"Scars of the Old Stream"	1:10
8.	"Under a Veil (of Black Lace)"	7:34
9.	"Where Shadows Dance"	1:58
10.	"Eternal Rise of the Sun (from We Are the Bible single)" (bonus track)	6:38
11.	"Nailed to the Cross/666 (from We Are the Bible single)" (bonus track)	4:09
12.	"Dreaming: The Romance"	23:23
Total length:		76:32

== Personnel ==
- Darren J. White – vocals
- John Douglas – drums
- Duncan Patterson – bass
- Danny Cavanagh – lead guitar
- Vincent Cavanagh – rhythm guitar

Guest musicians

- Ruth Wilson – vocals on "J'ai fait une promesse"

Production

- Paul "Hammy" Halmshaw – producer
- David Penprase – photography (cover)
- Darren J. White – photography
- Keith Appleton – mixing
- Mags – producer
- Dave Pybus – design, layout
- Porl Medlock – photography (black & white)

== Notes ==
- An alternate version of the song "Lovelorn Rhapsody" had been featured on the Peaceville Volume 4 compilation.
- The US-version of the album was released in May 1994 and is called Serenades + Extra Tracks. It omits "Dreaming: The Romance", and in its place, adds a studio version of the demo song "All Faith is Lost" as well as the entirety of The Crestfallen EP. It also has a red-orange front cover instead of the original's yellow-orange front cover. This version was released by the Futurist subsidiary of MCA Records.
- The Japanese Import version of the album features the song "Nailed to the Cross/666" as a bonus track.
- The album has also been released as a double CD with The Crestfallen.
- A remastered version of the album was released on CD in 2003, and is the current and most widely pressed CD release. It restores "Dreaming: The Romance" and also adds all tracks from the single release We Are The Bible.
- Serenades was finally released on vinyl in 2012. It is based on the 2003 audio remaster. However, it has neither "Dreaming: The Romance" nor any bonus tracks, making it the shortest commercially available version of the album to date.
- Orchestral versions of "J'ai fait une promesse" and "Sleep in Sanity" were recorded for the 2011 compilation Falling Deeper.
