= Eclipse (G.G.F.H. album) =

Studio album by G.G.F.H.
- Released: 1991
- Recorded: 1991, Missy Productions
- Genre: Industrial
- Length: 56:58
- Label: Dreamtime
- Producer: G.G.F.H.

G.G.F.H. chronology
Eclipse (1991)	Disease (1993)

Eclipse is the first studio album by the industrial techno band G.G.F.H. All the tracks on this release have been recorded before on the band's seventh demo, also entitled Eclipse, albeit in rougher or slightly different mixes. The tracks Eclipse, In My Room and Skalpel are only available on the CD. Nothing Left Inside is an industrialised cover version of a track by American punk/hardcore band Black Flag.

== Track listing ==
=== LP ===
Side One

1. "Fiending Korpse" – 3:52
2. "Forgiven" – 3:56
3. "Enter The Shadow" – 5:43
4. "Dead Inside" – 3:11
5. "Sister Cathleen" – 3:27
6. "Forever Is Forever" – 2:24

Side Two

1. "Scapegoat" – 5:28
2. "Secret Friend" – 3:20
3. "Nothing Left Inside" – 4:10
4. "Cookie Monster" – 2:49
5. "One Color Red" – 3:34

=== CD ===
- All Lyrics By Ghost; All Music By G.G.F.H., except where noted.
1. "Fiending Korpse" – 3:52
2. "Forgiven" – 3:56
3. "Enter The Shadow" – 5:43
4. "Dead Inside" – 3:11
5. "Eclipse" – 3:14+
6. "Sister Cathleen" – 3:27 (Lyrics: Brian J. Walls; Music: G.G.F.H.)
7. "Forever Is Forever" – 2:24
8. "Scapegoat" – 5:28
9. "Secret Friend" – 3:20
10. "In My Room" – 7:31+
11. "Skalpel" – 3:53+
12. "Nothing Left Inside" – 4:10 (Lyrics & Music: Black Flag)
13. "Cookie Monster" – 2:49
14. "One Color Red" – 3:34

+ Extra tracks on CD only

== Personnel ==
- Ghost (aka Michael Geist) - vocals, electronics, sampling, vocal treatments, programming
- Brian J. Walls - guitar, synthesizer programming, electronics, vocal treatments
  - With "Erika": Additional vocals on track 8

== Production ==
- Arranged & Produced By G.G.F.H.
- Engineered By Brian J. Walls
- Mixed By Brian J. Walls & Dan "Wrathbone" Rathbun at Polymorph Productions
- Mastered By Steve Lindsley at Live Oak
