= Peaceville Volume 4 =

Compilation album by Various Peaceville Artists
- Released: 1992
- Genres: Heavy metal: doom metal; symphonic metal; gothic rock; rock; industrial
- Length: 82:41
- Label: Peaceville

Various Peaceville Artists chronology
Vile Vibes (1990)	Peaceville Volume 4 (1992)	The Best of Peaceville (1995)

Peaceville Volume 4 is a 1992 compilation sampling various artists and genres within the Peaceville record label. Many of the tracks have brief sound collages between songs, which feature clips ranging from films to interviews with then-current Peaceville artists. The compilation's title and cover art spoof that of Black Sabbath Vol. 4. The version of Anathema's "Lovelorn Rhapsody" featured on this compilation would be exclusive until the track resurfaced in 2002 on the band's retrospective, Resonance Vol. 2.

== Track listing ==
1. Pentagram - "Sign of the Wolf (Pentagram)" – 3:28
2. Anathema - "Lovelorn Rhapsody (Original)" – 5:52
3. G.G.F.H. - "Room 213 (Mix)" – 4:12
4. My Dying Bride - "Erotic Literature" – 5:18
5. Kong - "Stockhouse" – 4:32
6. Autopsy - "Funereality" – 2:55
7. Sonic Violence - "Catalepsy (NFI Top Mix)" – 4:33
8. Darkthrone - "A Blaze in the Northern Sky" – 5:04
9. Accidental Suicide - "Morbid Indulgence" - 5:24
10. Paradise Lost - "Gothic (Mix)" – 5:20
11. Baphomet - "Leave the Flesh (Original)" – 3:06
12. Acrostichon - "Relics" – 5:41
13. Impaler - "Astral Corpse" – 5:37
14. The Gathering - "In Sickness and Health" – 7:08
15. Vital Remains - "Malevolent Invocation" – 4:18
16. Traumatic Voyage - "Godless" – 5:14
17. At the Gates - "Kingdom Gone" - 4:59
