= Pentecost III =

EP by Anathema
- Released: 24 April 1995
- Recorded: 1994
- Studio: The Academy, Yorkshire
- Genre: Death-doom, gothic metal
- Length: 41:25
- Label: Peaceville Records
- Producer: Anathema

Anathema chronology
Serenades (1993)	Pentecost III (1995)	The Silent Enigma (1995)

Professional ratings
Review scores
Source	Rating
Allmusic	4/5 stars

Pentecost III is an EP by the British doom metal band Anathema. It was recorded in 1994 but, due to a merging between labels Peaceville Records and Music for Nations, was not released until 1995. By this time, Darren White had been ousted from the band, whose remaining members were already working on their next album, The Silent Enigma. Pentecost III was re-issued as on one CD with The Crestfallen in 2001.

== Track listing ==
All lyrics written by White, all music written by Anathema.

No.	Title	Lyrics	Music	Length
1.	"Kingdom"	Darren White	Daniel Cavanagh	9:30
2.	"Mine Is Yours to Drown In (Ours Is the New Tribe)"	White	D. Cavanagh	5:40
3.	"We, the Gods"	White	Duncan Patterson, D. Cavanagh	10:00
4.	"Pentecost III"		D. Cavanagh	3:55
5.	"Memento Mori ("Memento Mori" ends at 8:13; the hidden track "Nailed to the Cross/666" starts at 9:13, after 1:00 of silence)"	White	D. Cavanagh, Vincent Cavanagh	12:20
Total length:				41:25

== Notes ==
- The album's liner notes state that "Pentecost III is dedicated to Tony Doyle, to Lin Mari Lowles, and to all the people who shared the grief of the terrible tragedy that befell us all this year 1994". Tony and Lin were two old friends of Anathema. Tony died from heart complications in his early twenties and, on the way to the funeral, Lin died in a traffic accident.
- The track "Memento Mori" contains the hidden track "Nailed to the Cross/666". On the Pentecost III/Crestfallen EP re-issue this hidden track is moved to the end of "They Die", the last track on the disc.
- The album artwork is an 1891 painting by Frederic Leighton called "Perseus and Andromeda".
- Orchestral versions of "Kingdom" and "We, the Gods" were recorded for the 2011 compilation Falling Deeper.

== Credits ==
- Daniel Cavanagh — guitar
- Vincent Cavanagh — guitar
- John Douglas — drums
- Duncan Patterson — bass guitar
- Darren White — vocals
