= A Fine Day to Exit =

Studio album by Anathema
- Released: 9 October 2001
- Recorded: Between August 2000 and June 2001, at Crash Studios, Liverpool; The Windings Walia; and Chapel Studios Lincolnshire
- Genres: Alternative rock; progressive rock
- Length: 62:30
- Label: Music for Nations
- Producer: Nick Griffiths

Anathema chronology
| Resonance (2001) | A Fine Day to Exit (2001) | Resonance 2 (2002) |

Singles from A Fine Day to Exit
- 1. "Pressure" Released: 2001

Professional ratings
Review scores
| Source | Rating |
|---|---|
| Allmusic | 3/5 stars |
| Sputnikmusic | 4.5/5 stars |
| Silencio Hungary | 3.5/5 stars |

A Fine Day to Exit is the sixth album by the British rock band Anathema. It was released on 9 October 2001 through Music for Nations.

This is the only occasion where an Anathema album has John Douglas credited as a writer for around half of the songs. He wrote "Pressure", "Looking Outside Inside", "Panic" (co-written with Daniel Cavanagh), the title track and the hidden acoustic track at the end of "Temporary Peace" called "In the Dog's House".

It is the last album with bassist Dave Pybus, and the first with keyboardist Les Smith.

== Track listing ==
| No. | Title | Writer(s) | Length |
|---|---|---|---|
| 1. | "Pressure" | John Douglas | 6:44 |
| 2. | "Release" | Daniel Cavanagh | 5:47 |
| 3. | "Looking Outside Inside" | Douglas* | 6:23 |
| 4. | "Leave No Trace" | Vincent Cavanagh | 4:46 |
| 5. | "Underworld" | V. Cavanagh (lyrics), D. Cavanagh (music) | 4:10 |
| 6. | "Barriers" | D. Cavanagh | 5:54 |
| 7. | "Panic" | Douglas (lyrics), D. Cavanagh (music) | 3:30 |
| 8. | "A Fine Day to Exit" | Douglas | 6:49 |
| 9. | "Temporary Peace"^{†}: I. "Temporary Peace" (5:40); II. "Crashing waves" (2:10); III. "Sound of footsteps and voices" (2:35); IV. "5-minute silence" (5:00); V. "In the Dog's House (acoustic finale)" (3:05)" | D. Cavanagh | 18:30 |
| Total length: | | | 62:30 |

* Credited to only John Douglas on initial release; reissues credit Douglas, V. Cavanagh, D. Cavanagh, D. Pybus, L. Smith
^{†} "Temporary Peace" proper fades into the sound of waves crashing and finishes at 5:40. More crashing waves follow with the sound of footsteps, voices, and piano chords beginning at 7:50 and going on until minute 10:25. That's followed by five minutes of silence; at 15:25 the acoustic hidden song "In the Dog's House" starts.

2015 Reissue
| No. | Title | Writer(s) | Length |
|---|---|---|---|
| 1. | "A Fine Day" | Daniel Cavanagh | 3:36 |
| 2. | "Release" | D. Cavanagh | 5:40 |
| 3. | "Leave No Trace" | Vincent Cavanagh | 4:46 |
| 4. | "Underworld" | V. Cavanagh (lyrics), D. Cavanagh (music) | 4:12 |
| 5. | "Pressure" | John Douglas | 6:38 |
| 6. | "Panic" | Douglas (lyrics), D. Cavanagh (music) | 3:38 |
| 7. | "Breaking Down the Barriers" | D. Cavanagh | 5:44 |
| 8. | "Looking Outside Inside" | Douglas, V. Cavanagh, D. Cavanagh, Dave Pybus, Les Smith** | 6:15 |
| 9. | "A Fine Day to Exit" | Douglas | 6:49 |
| 10. | "Temporary Peace"^{††}: I. "Temporary Peace" (5:40); II. "Crashing waves" (4:06); III. "Sound of footsteps and voices" (2:29); IV. "In the Dog's House (acoustic finale)" (3:01)" | D. Cavanagh | 15:16 |
| Total length: | | | 62:34 |

** Credited to only John Douglas on initial release
^{††} "Temporary Peace" proper fades into the sound of waves crashing and finishes at minute 5:40. More crashing waves until 9:46 when the sound of footsteps, voices, and piano chords begin; at 12:15 the acoustic hidden song "In the Dog's House" starts.

== Personnel ==
- Vincent Cavanagh – vocals, guitars
- Danny Cavanagh – guitars, keyboards, backing vocals
- Les Smith – keyboards, programming
- John Douglas – drums

Additional musicians

- Dave Pybus – bass (except "Looking Outside In" and "Leave No Trace")
- Lee Douglas – vocals on "Barriers" and "Temporary Peace"
- Nick Griffiths, Pete Brown – backing vocals

Production

- Ewan Davies – engineering assistant
- Pete Brown – engineering
- Les Smith – engineering
- Colin Richardson – mixing
- Wil Bartle – engineering assistant
- Travis Smith – artwork
- Nick Griffiths – producer, engineering
- Martin Wilding – engineering assistant

== Charts ==
Chart performance for A Fine Day to Exit
| Chart (2001) | Peak position |
|---|---|
| Finnish Albums (Suomen virallinen lista) | 34 |
| French Albums (SNEP) | 124 |
| German Albums (Offizielle Top 100) | 95 |
| Polish Albums (ZPAV) | 22 |
