= Eternity (Anathema album) =

Studio album by Anathema
- Released: 25 November 1996
- Recorded: 1996
- Studio: The Windings, Wales
- Genre: Gothic metal; alternative metal
- Length: 57:54
- Label: Peaceville
- Producer: Tony Platt

Anathema chronology
| The Silent Enigma (1995) | Eternity (1996) | Alternative 4 (1998) |

Eternity is the third album by the British rock band Anathema. It was released in November 1996 through Peaceville Records.

== Background ==
Professional ratings
Review scores
| Source | Rating |
|---|---|
| AllMusic | 4/5 stars |
| Silencio Hungary | 5/5 stars |

Eternity moves away from the death-doom style of Anathema's first two albums, featuring heavier use of keyboards and mostly clean vocals. It features a version of Roy Harper's track "Hope".

It is the last album with drummer John Douglas before his return to the band in 1998.

== Track listing ==
| No. | Title | Lyrics | Music | Length |
|---|---|---|---|---|
| 1. | "Sentient" | -- | Daniel Cavanagh | 2:59 |
| 2. | "Angelica" | Duncan Patterson | D. Cavanagh | 5:51 |
| 3. | "The Beloved" | Vincent Cavanagh | D. Cavanagh | 4:44 |
| 4. | "Eternity Part I" | Patterson | Patterson | 5:35 |
| 5. | "Eternity Part II" | Patterson | Patterson | 3:12 |
| 6. | "Hope" (Roy Harper cover) | Roy Harper | David Gilmour | 5:55 |
| 7. | "Suicide Veil" | Patterson | D. Cavanagh, Patterson | 5:11 |
| 8. | "Radiance" | D. Cavanagh | D. Cavanagh | 5:52 |
| 9. | "Far Away" | Patterson | Patterson | 5:30 |
| 10. | "Eternity Part III" | Patterson | Patterson | 4:44 |
| 11. | "Cries on the Wind" | Patterson | D. Cavanagh, Patterson | 5:01 |
| 12. | "Ascension" | -- | D. Cavanagh | 3:20 |
| Total length: | | | | 57:54 |

Japanese edition bonus tracks
| No. | Title | Lyrics | Music | Length |
|---|---|---|---|---|
| 13. | "Far Away" (acoustic) | | | 5:23 |
| 14. | "Eternity Part III" (acoustic) | | | 5:06 |
| 15. | "Sleepless '96" | Darren White | D. Cavanagh | 4:30 |
| Total length: | | | | 72:53 |

== Personnel ==
- Vincent Cavanagh – vocals, guitars
- John Douglas – drums
- Duncan Patterson – bass
- Danny Cavanagh – guitars, keyboards

Guest musicians

- Michelle Richfield – female vocals
- Les Smith – keyboards
- Roy Harper – spoken word on "Hope"

Production

- Porl Medlock – photography (band)
- Mez – cover art
- Jan Anderson – mastering
- Martin Wilding – engineering assistant
- Tony Platt – producer, engineering
