= Mystica (The Blood Divine album) =

Studio album by The Blood Divine
- Released: 1997
- Recorded: Lartington Hall Studios, County Durham, May–June 1997
- Genre: Gothic metal Doom metal
- Length: 39:55
- Label: Peaceville
- Producer: Peter Coleman, The Blood Divine

The Blood Divine chronology
Awaken (1996)	Mystica (1997)	Rise Pantheon Dreams (2002)

Mystica is the second and final studio album by the British Gothic metal band The Blood Divine.

== Track listing ==
1. "Mystica" – 4:18
2. "As Rapture Fades" – 3:24
3. "Visions in Blue" – 4:32
4. "The Passion Reigns" – 2:54
5. "Leaving Me Helpless" – 3:06
6. "Visions Part II: Event Horizon" – 2:04
7. "I Believe" – 2:43
8. "Enhanced by Your Touch" – 1:55
9. "Sensual Ecstasy" – 4:04
10. "Fear of a Lonely World" – 6:31
11. "Prayer" – 4:24

== Credits ==
- Darren White - Vocals
- Paul Ryan - Guitars
- Benjamin Ryan - Keyboards
- Steve Maloney - Bass
- Was Sarginson - Drums, Percussion
