= The Blood Divine =

British gothic metal band

- Origin: Colchester, Essex, England
- Genres: Gothic metal, doom metal, death-doom
- Years active: 1995–1998
- Label: Peaceville Records
- Past members: Benjamin Ryan; Paul Ryan; Darren "Daz" White; William A. 'W.A.S.' Sarginson; Steve Maloney; Paul Allender

The Blood Divine were a British gothic metal band, founded in the summer of 1995 by Paul Allender, brothers Paul and Benjamin Ryan, and Darren White. Allender and the brothers Ryan had recently left Cradle of Filth after the release of The Principle of Evil Made Flesh and White had recently parted ways with Anathema. They recruited drummer William A. 'W.A.S.' Sarginson and bassist Steve Maloney and were quickly signed up by Peaceville Records.

Their debut album, Awaken, was recorded in early 1996 and released through Peaceville Records later that year. At the end of 1996, they toured throughout Europe with Cathedral and label mates, My Dying Bride. In the early summer of 1997, they recorded their second album, Mystica, and guitarist Paul Allender left the band to spend more time with his family (however he eventually rejoined Cradle of Filth). Mystica was released later that year, again through Peaceville Records. The album had less of a goth sound and more of a classic rock influenced progressive sound. The band continued and toured as a five-piece, touring the UK with Orange Goblin supporting and then a short tour of Holland at the beginning of 1998. The band were looking to develop their sound and keyboard player Benjamin Ryan was told to leave the band in April 1998. However, this dismayed Paul Ryan, and shortly afterwards the band split up.

In 2002, Peaceville released The Blood Divine compilation album Rise Pantheon Dreams. The track list included songs from both Awaken and Mystica, as well as two previously unreleased tracks ("Revolt" and "Forever Belongs"), a live version of "Aureole", and a live cover of The Osmonds' "Crazy Horses".

Allender later rejoined Cradle of Filth. Sarginson briefly joined Cradle of Filth before the band settled in with Swedish drummer Adrian Erlandsson, who was later replaced by Martin Škaroupka. In 2004, Darren White formed a new band, Serotonal.

== Members ==
- Benjamin Ryan – keyboards, organ, vocals (1995–1998)
- Paul Ryan – guitars (1995–1998)
- Darren "Daz" White – vocals (1995–1998)
- William A. 'W.A.S.' Sarginson – drums (1995–1998)
- Steve Maloney – bass (1995–1998)
- Paul Allender – guitars (1995–1996)

== Discography ==
- Promo Tape (Demo, 1996)
- Awaken (1996)
- Mystica (1997)
- Rise Pantheon Dreams (Compilation, 2002)
