= We're Here Because We're Here (album) =

Studio album by Anathema
- Released: 31 May 2010
- Genres: Progressive rock; art rock; post-rock
- Length: 58:10
- Label: Kscope
- Producers: Vincent Cavanagh and Daniel Cavanagh, mixed by Steven Wilson

Anathema chronology
Hindsight (2008)	We're Here Because We're Here (2010)	Falling Deeper (2011)

We're Here Because We're Here is the eighth album by the British rock band Anathema. It was released on 31 May 2010. The working title of the album was Horizons. The album was mixed by Steven Wilson of Porcupine Tree.

== Background ==
Ville Valo of the band HIM recorded backing vocals for the song "Angels Walk Among Us". The title of the album is taken from a song of the same name that was sung in the Allied trenches of World War I to the tune of "Auld Lang Syne".

It is the last album to feature keyboardist Les Smith, as well as the first to feature vocalist Lee Douglas as an official band member.

== Reception ==
Professional ratings
Review scores
Source	Rating
Allmusic	3.5/5 stars
Sputnikmusic	4.5/5 stars
Silencio Hungary	4/5 stars
Classic Rock	(9/10)

Response from the critics was universally positive. The album was awarded "Prog Album of the Year" by Classic Rock magazine, who described it as "a flawless, life-affirming comeback and a gold-plated contender for album of the year".

== Track listing ==
All songs written by Daniel Cavanagh, except where noted.

No.	Title	Writer(s)	Length
1.	"Thin Air"	Vincent Cavanagh, John Douglas (lyrics); D. Cavanagh (music)	5:59
2.	"Summernight Horizon"		4:12
3.	"Dreaming Light"		5:47
4.	"Everything"		5:05
5.	"Angels Walk Among Us (featuring Ville Valo)"		5:17
6.	"Presence (featuring Stan Ambrose)"		2:58
7.	"A Simple Mistake"		8:14
8.	"Get Off Get Out"	John Douglas	5:01
9.	"Universal"	Douglas	7:19
10.	"Hindsight"		8:10
Total length:			58:10

Limited Edition Bonus Tracks
No.	Title	Length
1.	"Angels Walk Among Us (Demo Mix)"	5:05
2.	"Presence (Demo Mix)"	2:36
3.	"A Simple Mistake (Demo Mix)"	8:15

7 Inch Bonus Tracks
No.	Title	Length
1.	"Dreaming Light (Orchestral Version)"	5:32
2.	"Universal (Orchestral Version)"	7:24

Bonus Download Track
No.	Title	Length
1.	"Everything (Demo Mix)"	5:13

Special Edition Bonus DVD–Audio

- The Entire Album in lossless 24/48 5.1 Surround and Stereo

== Singles ==
Dreaming Light Digital Single/EP

1. "Dreaming Light"
2. "Universal" (Engineers Remix)
3. "Dreaming Light" (Video)

Everything Digital Single

1. Everything

== Personnel ==
- Vincent Cavanagh — vocals, guitar
- Daniel Cavanagh — guitar, piano, keyboards, vocals
- Jamie Cavanagh — bass guitar
- John Douglas — percussion, drums, keyboards, guitars
- Lee Douglas — vocals
- Les Smith — keyboards

== Charts ==
Chart (2010)	Peak position
Dutch Albums (Album Top 100)	52
Finnish Albums (Suomen virallinen lista)	19
French Albums (SNEP)	69
German Albums (Offizielle Top 100)	50
Greek Albums (IFPI)	6
Italian Albums (FIMI)	55
UK Independent Albums (Official Charts)	31
