= Alternative 4 (album) =

Studio album by Anathema
- Released: 22 June 1998
- Recorded: January–February 1998
- Studio: The Windings
- Genre: Gothic metal; alternative metal
- Length: 44:57
- Label: Peaceville
- Producer: Kit Woolven

Anathema chronology
| Eternity (1996) | Alternative 4 (1998) | Judgement (1999) |

Alternative 4 is the fourth studio album by the English rock band Anathema. It was released on 22 June 1998 through Peaceville Records. Like the band's third album Eternity, Alternative 4 is sung with clean vocals.

== Background ==
Professional ratings
Review scores
| Source | Rating |
|---|---|
| AllMusic | 3/5 stars |
| Sputnikmusic | 4/5 stars |
| Silencio Hungary | 3/5 stars |

The album's title is derived from Leslie Watkins' book Alternative 3. Bassist and co-principal songwriter Duncan Patterson had read it a few years before they wrote the album. The book is about conspiracy theories, and most songs on Alternative 4 are about trust. Patterson would later play in a band with the same title, with songs based on similar themes. In keeping with the theme of conspiracies, the album cover is a modified photo of American astronaut Buzz Aldrin (depicted as an angel) on the Moon during the 1969 Apollo 11 mission – this is in reference to the conspiracy of the Moon landings.

It is the last with Patterson and the only album released without John Douglas. He was replaced by Shaun Steels in 1997 but returned in 1998.

== Track listing ==
| No. | Title | Writer(s) | Length |
|---|---|---|---|
| 1. | "Shroud of False" | Duncan Patterson | 1:37 |
| 2. | "Fragile Dreams" | Daniel Cavanagh | 5:32 |
| 3. | "Empty" | Patterson | 3:00 |
| 4. | "Lost Control" | Patterson | 5:50 |
| 5. | "Re-Connect" | Vincent Cavanagh | 3:52 |
| 6. | "Inner Silence" | D. Cavanagh | 3:08 |
| 7. | "Alternative 4" | Patterson | 6:18 |
| 8. | "Regret" | D. Cavanagh | 7:58 |
| 9. | "Feel" | Patterson | 5:28 |
| 10. | "Destiny" | Patterson | 2:14 |
| Total length: | | | 44:57 |

2003 re-release bonus tracks
| No. | Title | Writer(s) | Length |
|---|---|---|---|
| 11. | "Your Possible Pasts" (Pink Floyd cover) | Roger Waters | 4:28 |
| 12. | "One of the Few" (Pink Floyd cover) | Waters | 1:50 |
| 13. | "Better Off Dead" (Bad Religion cover) | Brett Gurewitz | 4:21 |
| 14. | "Goodbye Cruel World" (Pink Floyd cover) | Waters | 1:39 |
| Total length: | | | 57:15 |

== Personnel ==
- Vincent Cavanagh – vocals, guitars
- Shaun Steels – drums
- Duncan Patterson – bass, keyboards, piano
- Danny Cavanagh – guitars, keyboards, piano

Guest musicians

- Andy Duncan – drum loops on "Empty"
- George Rucci – violin
- Michelle Richfield (Dominion) – vocals on "Better Off Dead"

Production

- Duncan Patterson – cover concept
- Tim Spear – cover art
- Noel Summerville – mastering
- Doug Cook – mixing assistant
- Simon Dawson – engineering assistant
- Kit Woolven – producer, mixing
- Lili Wilde – photography (band)
