= Darren "Daz" White =

English musician

Darren White
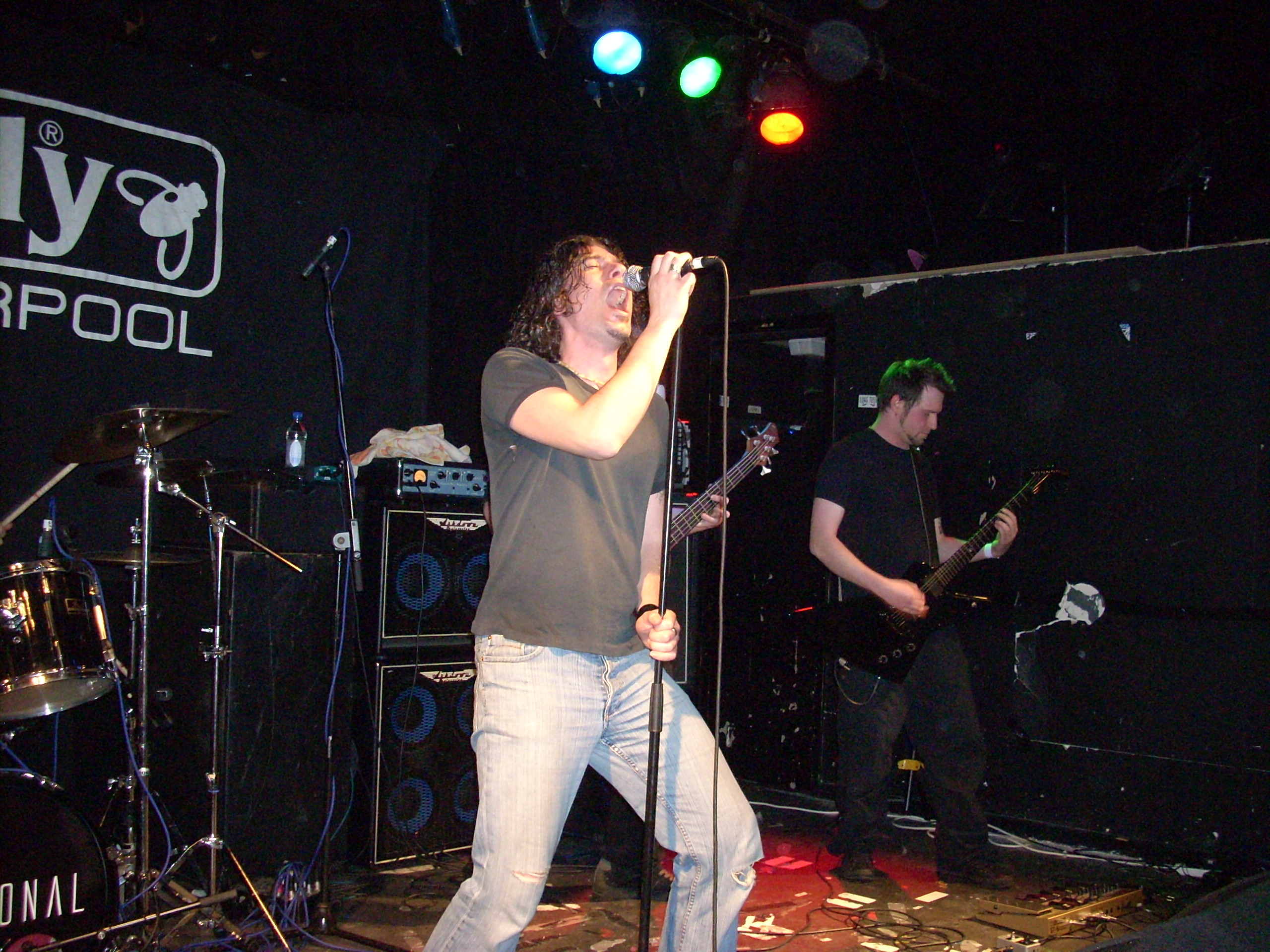
- Darren White performing with Serotonal at Liverpool Barfly, 31 March 2008

Background information
- Born: Darren John White; 30 March 1972 (age 54); Liverpool, England
- Genres: Doom metal Symphonic black metal Death metal Gothic metal
- Instruments: Vocals drums
- Years active: 1990–present

Darren John "Daz" White (born 30 March 1972) is an English musician raised in Liverpool and best known as the original vocalist for the band Anathema. His low death grunts on the band's early recordings pinpointed the group's early identification with the death/doom genre.

White also fronted other bands, including The Blood Divine with former members of Cradle of Filth (for which he did backing vocals/spoken words on The Principle of Evil Made Flesh) and Dead Men Dream. His project, Serotonal, has been described as "drone/atmospheric doom". In February 2009 Serotonal signed a record deal with Union Black Records, and debut album Monumental – Songs of Misery and Hope was released on 24 November 2009. Darren is also erroneously said to have played drums for Cradle of Filth in 1991–92. This, however, was Darren Gardner. He is now singing in Antifear alongside ex-Anathema bandmate Duncan Patterson.

== Discography ==
- Anathema – An Iliad of Woes (1990)
- Anathema – All Faith Is Lost (1991)
- Anathema – They Die / Crestfallen (1992)
- Anathema – The Crestfallen (1992)
- Anathema – Serenades (1993)
- Anathema – Pentecost III (1995)
- The Blood Divine – Awaken (1996)
- The Blood Divine – Mystica (1997)
- Dead Men Dream – Absolute Zero (2002)
- Serotonal – The End of Everything (2004)
- Serotonal – The Futility of Trying To Avoid The Unavoidable (2007)
- Serotonal – Monumental (2009)
- Duncan Patterson – The Eternity Suite (2015)
