= Anathema (band) =

British rock band (1990–2020)

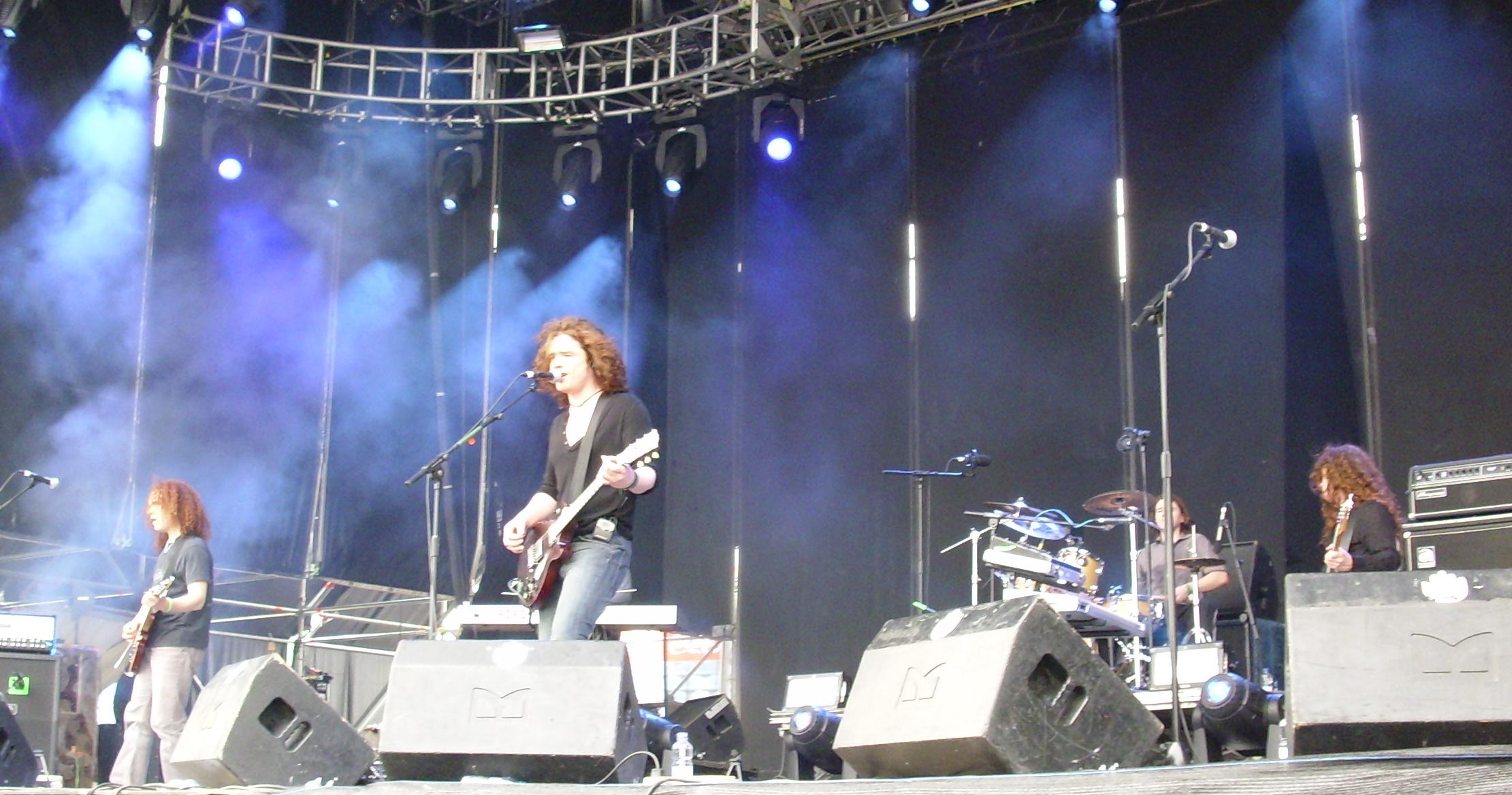
- Anathema at Festimad 2007

Background information
- Also known as: Pagan Angel (1990)
- Origin: Liverpool, Merseyside, England
- Genres: Progressive rock; alternative rock; gothic metal (early); death-doom (early)
- Years active: 1990–2020
- Labels: Peaceville; Music for Nations; Kscope
- Spinoffs: Antimatter; Alternative 4; Weather Systems
- Members: Vincent Cavanagh; Daniel Cavanagh; John Douglas; Lee Douglas; Daniel Cardoso; Darren White; Jamie Cavanagh; Duncan Patterson; Shaun Steels; Martin Powell; Dave Pybus; Les Smith
- Website: anathemamusic.com

Anathema were an English rock band from Liverpool, formed in 1990 by Vincent and Daniel Cavanagh, bassist Jamie Cavanagh, drummer/keyboardist John Douglas, and vocalist Darren "Daz" White.

The band maintained an active concert schedule throughout their career. They first toured in 1992 with American death metal band Cannibal Corpse. They since performed throughout Europe, the United States, Central America, Australia, New Zealand, India, and Turkey. In the latter stages of their career, the band performed at venues such as London's O2 Arena, Wembley Arena, and the London Palladium, and appeared on stage with Stephen Hawking at Starmus Festival 3.

Anathema released 11 studio albums, including Distant Satellites (2014), which included the song "Anathema", named the Anthem of the Year at the third annual Progressive Music Awards. Three years later, The Optimist was named Album of the Year at the Progressive Music Awards.

== History ==
=== 1990–1995: Serenades and The Silent Enigma ===
Anathema formed in 1990 as a doom metal band named Pagan Angel. In November of that year, the band recorded their first demo, An Iliad of Woes. This demo caught the attention of several bands and labels from the English metal scene.

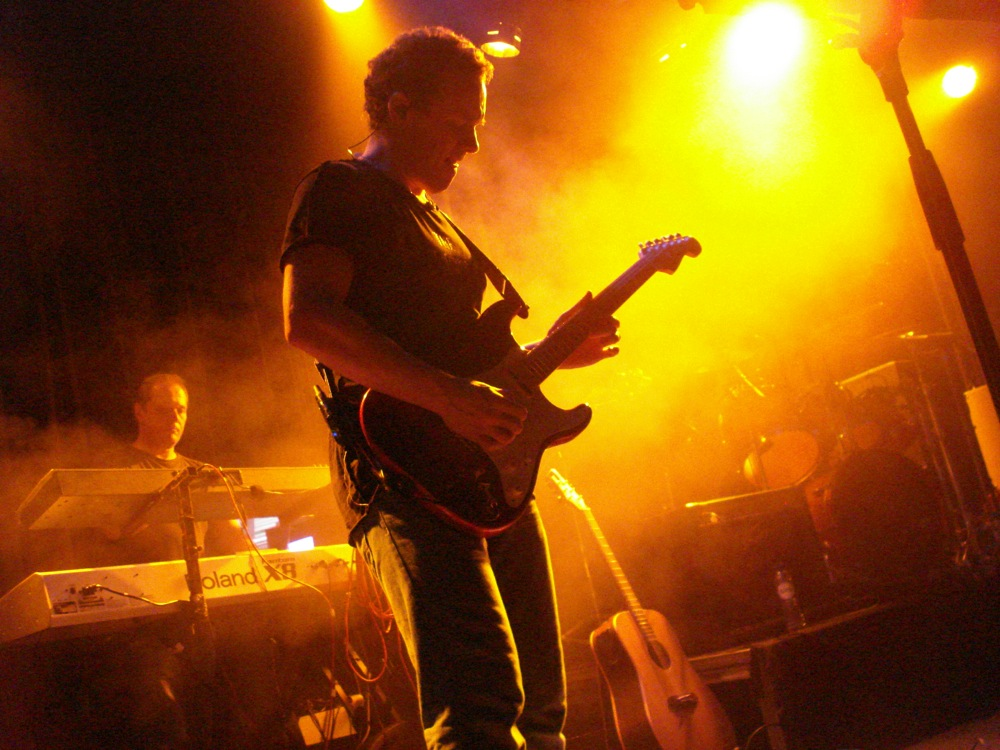
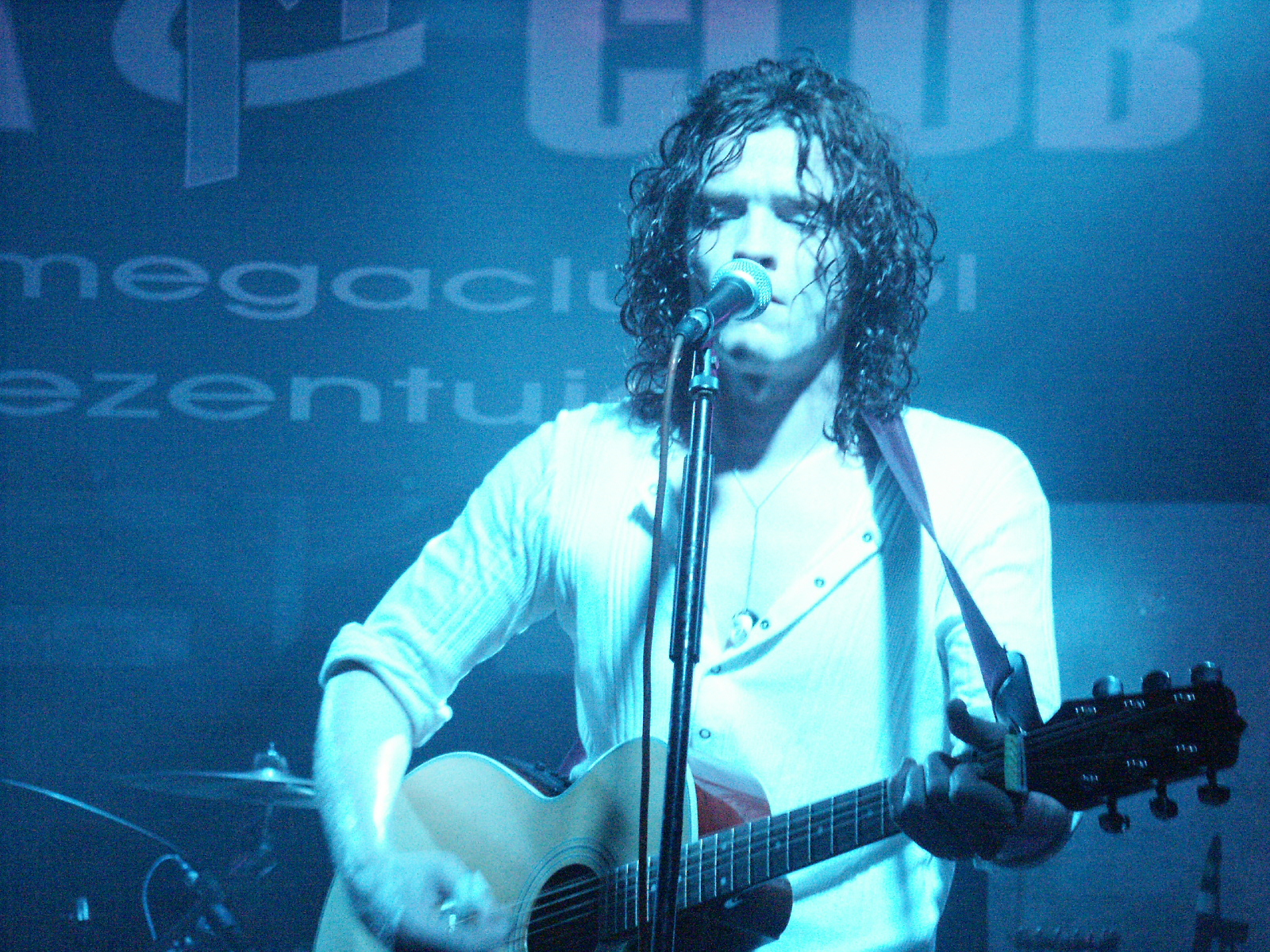
Brothers Daniel Cavanagh (above) and Vincent Cavanagh (below), both of them vocalists, guitarists and composers for the band

At the beginning of 1991, the band gained attention with the release of their second demo, All Faith Is Lost, resulting in a four-album deal with Peaceville Records. Their first release under the label was The Crestfallen EP in November 1992. They took the material from that album on the road, touring with Cannibal Corpse.

Serenades, Anathema's debut LP, attracted mainstream attention, propelling their "Sweet Tears" music video onto the MTV playlist. Anathema's first European tour was in 1994, and was followed by shows at the Independent Rock Festival in Brazil.

In May 1995, vocalist Darren White left the band, eventually forming The Blood Divine. Rather than recruiting a new vocalist, guitarist Vincent Cavanagh assumed White's role. This new formation debuted by touring with Cathedral in the United Kingdom, and released The Silent Enigma soon after. It showed the band taking a direction akin to gothic metal.

=== 1996–1999: Eternity, Alternative 4, and Judgement ===
Eternity was released in 1996, relying more on atmospheric sounds, and transitioning to clean vocals. The album Judgement later consolidated this style. A European tour followed the album's release.

Drummer John Douglas departed the band in the summer of 1997. He was replaced with Shaun Steels, formerly of Solstice, who would later play drums for My Dying Bride.

Alternative 4 was released in 1998. During this time, the band underwent many line-up changes. Bassist/keyboardist/songwriter Duncan Patterson quit due to musical differences and was replaced with Dave Pybus of Dreambreed, a band that Duncan had played bass for during a short period. Not long after this, Martin Powell (who had played keyboards and violin for My Dying Bride) joined the band for live performances. Founding drummer John Douglas returned to the drums in place of Steels.

In June 1999, the album Judgement was released, completing Anathema's shift from doom metal, focusing instead on slower, more experimental songs. This new sound has been likened to Pink Floyd, Jeff Buckley, and to a lesser extent, Radiohead. Their songs continued to express feelings of depression and desperation.

=== 2000–2009: A Fine Day to Exit and A Natural Disaster ===
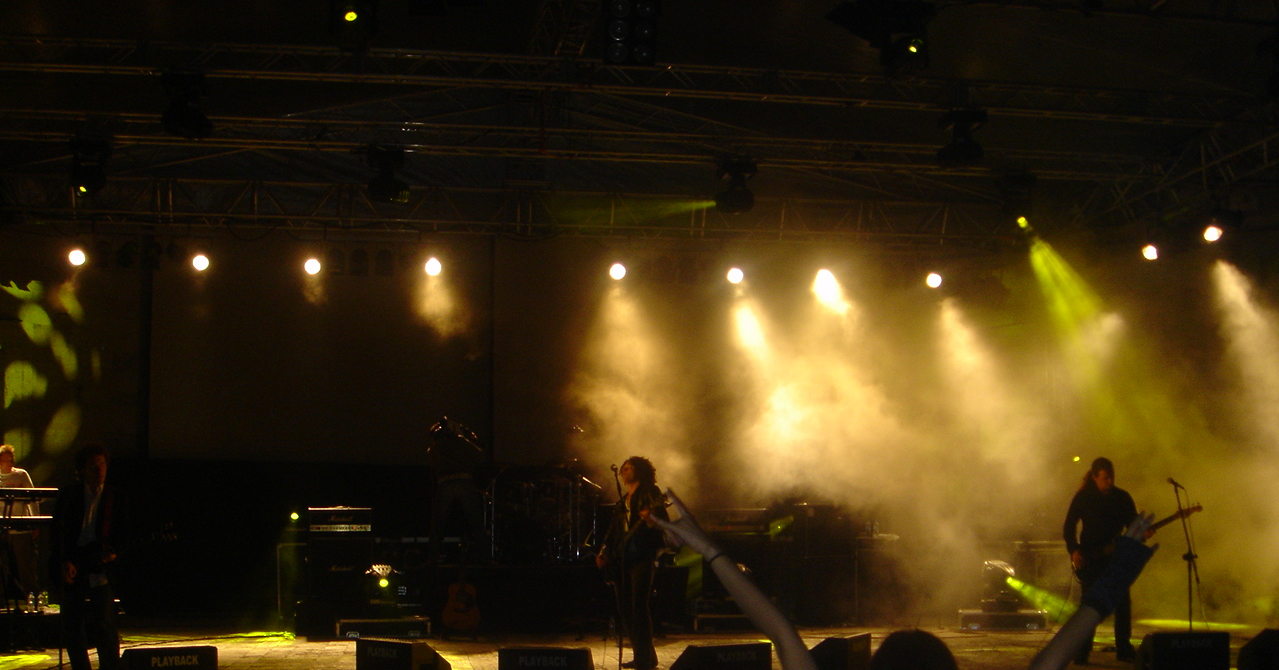
Anathema in concert at Istanbul Cemil Topuzlu Harbiye Amphitheatre in 2005

In 2000, Martin Powell switched positions with Cradle of Filth's keyboardist Les Smith, who became an integral member of Anathema.

Shortly before the release of A Fine Day to Exit, Dave Pybus announced his departure from the band and joined Cradle of Filth. He was replaced with touring bassist George Roberts, and later with Jamie Cavanagh.

In March 2002, Daniel Cavanagh announced his departure from the band, joining Duncan Patterson's band Antimatter. However, later in April 2002 he changed his mind and rejoined Anathema for the release of A Natural Disaster, and started their European tour. This precipitated Anathema's change towards the atmospheric and progressive, as heard in album tracks "Flying" and "Violence".

When label Music for Nations closed after its purchase by Sony BMG, Anathema did not have a record label, despite completing a tour of the UK with Finnish rock band HIM in April 2006. During their search for a new label, the band adopted a DIY approach to music release, embracing the internet and releasing songs on their website, for which fans may donate a monetary sum of their own choice. Despite the lack of label-based tour support, the band continued to play dates across Europe, while guitarist Danny Cavanagh played the odd low-key acoustic concert.

=== 2010–2013: We're Here Because We're Here and Weather Systems ===
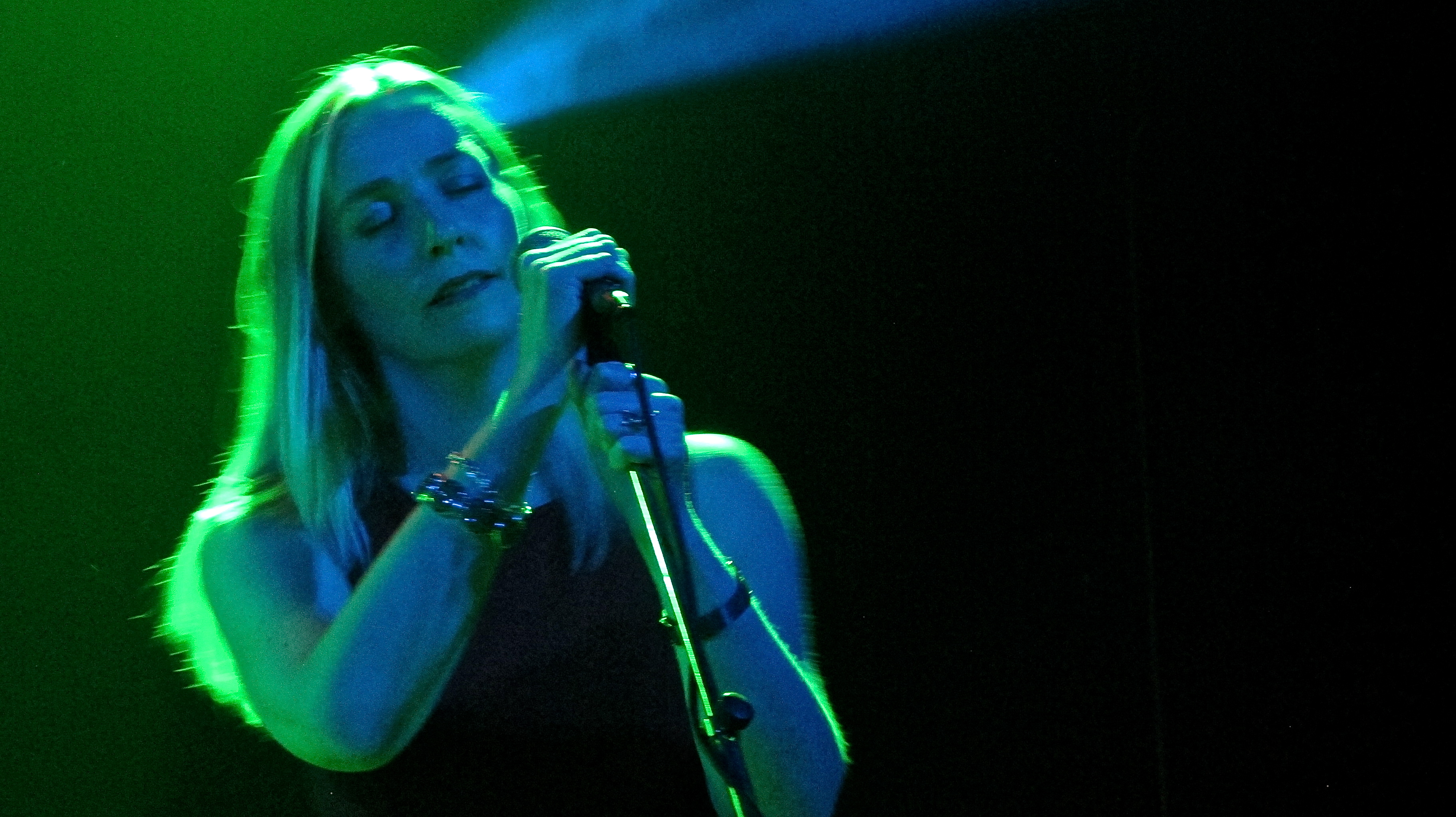
Lee Douglas, John Douglas' sister, formally joined the band as a singer after some guest appearances.

On 20 March 2010, Anathema announced on their website and Facebook page the release date of their next album. We're Here Because We're Here was released on 31 May 2010 on the Kscope label. John Douglas' sister Lee Douglas joined the band as a vocalist for the recording of this album. She had performed on the three previous albums as a guest vocalist. In 2010, the band played the UK rock festival Download with A Day to Remember and Bullet for My Valentine.

On 6 July 2011, it was announced on the band's official page that their album of re-interpretations, Falling Deeper, would be released on 5 September 2011. The album was a follow-up to Hindsight and contained orchestral versions of previously released songs, as well as a version of "Everwake" featuring the vocals of Anneke van Giersbergen. On 12 September 2011, the band's website announced Les Smith's departure due to "creative and musical differences".

On 16 April 2012, the band's ninth studio album, Weather Systems, was released via Kscope. The album entered the UK album charts at No. 50 and the German album charts at No. 19.

On 8 November 2012, Daniel Cavanagh announced on Anathema's official website that Daniel Cardoso was joining on a permanent basis. Cardoso and John Douglas switched positions of keyboardist and drummer respectively.

On 2 December 2012, Anathema announced their first concert in India. Anathema performed at IIT Madras as part of the Saarang Rock Show on 12 January 2013.

The band's live album, Untouchable, was released as a double vinyl album on 24 June 2013. The album is a recording of a one-off show at the ancient Roman theatre of Philippopolis in 2012, where the Plovdiv Philharmonic Orchestra joined the band. The set was released on Blu-ray, DVD and CD under the name Universal, with an alternate track order, on 17 September 2013.

The band performed on drummer Mike Portnoy's Progressive Nation at Sea tour aboard the Norwegian Cruise Line ship Pearl that sailed from the Port of Miami on 18 February 2014.

=== 2014–2020: Distant Satellites, The Optimist, and indefinite hiatus ===
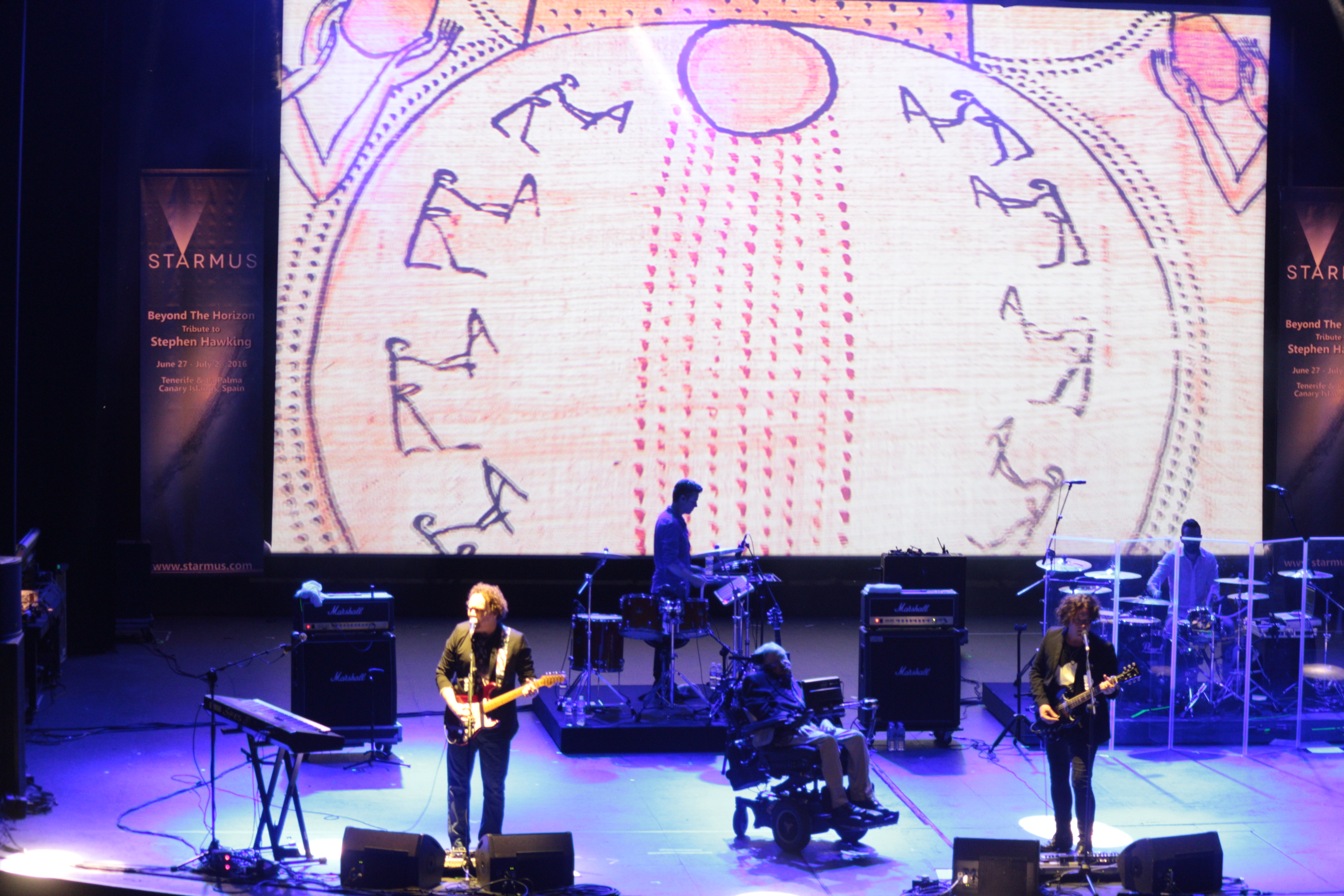
The band performing at the 2016 Starmus Festival alongside theoretical physicist Stephen Hawking

On 28 March 2014, the band announced their upcoming studio album, Distant Satellites. The album came out on 9 June 2014 on the Kscope label, and was produced by Christer-André Cederberg in Oslo, Norway. Steven Wilson (of Porcupine Tree) mixed several tracks. Unlike previous albums, this one features more electronica. The album was released in four different versions: CD, vinyl, media book, and a deluxe version. The band toured the album starting 22 May in Istanbul, Turkey, continuing throughout Europe and travelling to Australia for the first time to perform three dates during August 2014.

Following the success of their Australian tour, an acoustic tour was announced for New Zealand and Australia in 2015. Daniel, Vincent, and Lee performed these shows without the other band members. Later that year, the band released an acoustic live album and video entitled A Sort of Homecoming, consisting of a concert at the band's hometown Liverpool Cathedral.

Anathema went on their Resonance Tour through Europe in April 2015. These concerts served as live retrospectives, featuring songs throughout their catalog, including from their debut album Serenades. Former vocalist Darren "Daz" White and former bassist/keyboardist Duncan Patterson joined the band on stage for these concerts.

In 2017, the band released The Optimist, which won Album of the Year at the Progressive Music Awards.

At the end of August 2019, it was announced that Anathema would leave the Kscope record label and had signed a deal with Mascot Label Group. Anathema planned to release their 12th studio album in 2020. However, Anathema announced an indefinite hiatus on 22 September 2020.

=== Daniel's solo album Cellar Door and post-Anathema side project Weather Systems ===
Daniel Cavanagh announced he was working on a solo album named Cellar Door, and had started a new musical project named Weather Systems. The project takes the name of Anathema's 2012 album, and, according to a post on the Anathema Facebook page, "the music will be a continuation of the previous band's legacy". In December 2021, it was posted on Anathema's Facebook page that John Douglas had joined the Weather Systems project.

On 27 September 2024, the project released its debut album, Ocean Without a Shore, which – despite the earlier announcement – did not feature John Douglas, but Daniel Cardoso on drums. It contains the songs "Untouchable Part 3" and "Are You There? Part 2".

== Band members ==
Final lineup

- Daniel Cavanagh – lead guitar, vocals, keyboards (1990–2020, brief hiatus in 2002)
- Vincent Cavanagh – rhythm guitar (1990–2020), lead vocals, keyboards (1995–2020)
- John Douglas – drums (1990–1997, 1998–2020), keyboards, electronic percussion (2011–2020)
- Jamie Cavanagh – bass (1990–1991, 2002–2020)
- Lee Douglas – lead and backing vocals (1999–2020)
- Daniel Cardoso – drums, keyboards (2011–2020)

Past members

- Duncan Patterson – bass, keyboards (1991–1998)
- Darren White – lead vocals (1990–1995)
- Shaun Steels – drums (1997–1998)
- Dave Pybus – bass (1998–2001)
- Les Smith – keyboards (2000–2011)

Touring musicians

- Martin Powell – keyboards, violin (1998–2000)
- George Roberts – bass (2001)
- Charlie Cawood – bass (2020)

== Discography ==
Studio albums

- Serenades (1993)
- The Silent Enigma (1995)
- Eternity (1996)
- Alternative 4 (1998)
- Judgement (1999)
- A Fine Day to Exit (2001)
- A Natural Disaster (2003)
- We're Here Because We're Here (2010)
- Weather Systems (2012)
- Distant Satellites (2014)
- The Optimist (2017)
