= Daniel Cavanagh =

English musician (born 1972)

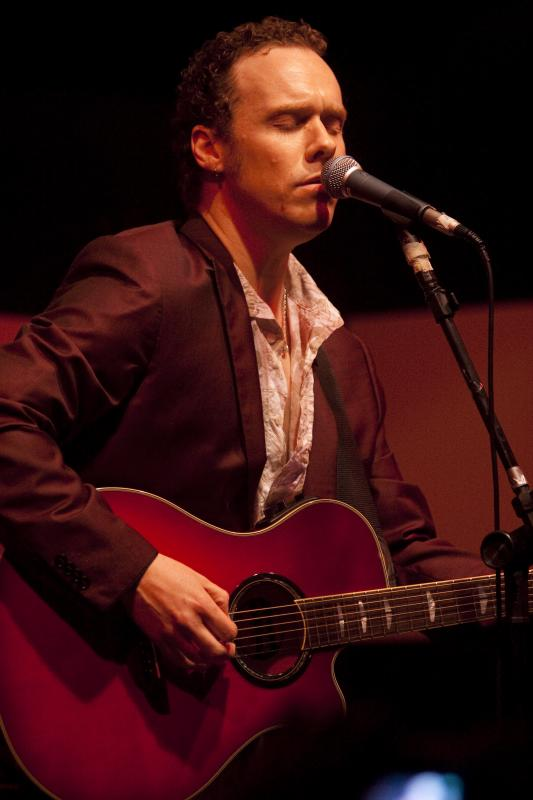
- Cavanagh performing in 2010

Background information
- Born: 6 October 1972 (age 53)
- Origin: Anfield, Liverpool, England
- Genres: Progressive rock; alternative rock; gothic metal; death-doom (early)
- Occupation: Musician
- Instruments: Guitar; vocals; piano
- Years active: 1990–present
- Member of: Weather Systems
- Formerly of: Anathema; Leafblade; Lid

Daniel Cavanagh (born 6 October 1972) is an English guitarist and singer who formed the rock band Anathema in 1990 with his brother Vincent.

Cavanagh has been involved in other musical projects, including the acoustic and Celtic rock band Leafblade and the psychedelic rock group Lid. He has worked as a touring musician for Antimatter, and he collaborated with Anneke van Giersbergen on her 2009 cover of Damien Rice's "The Blower's Daughter". He has additionally released four solo albums.

== Career ==
=== Anathema ===
In 1990, Cavanagh formed the rock band Anathema with his brothers Vincent (guitar) and Jamie (bass), along with John Douglas (drums/keyboards), and Darren "Daz" White (vocals).

=== Antimatter ===
In 2002, Cavanagh began touring with Antimatter, a gothic rock band led by former Anathema bassist Duncan Patterson.

=== Solo ===
In 2004, Cavanagh released his debut solo album, A Place to Be, which featured him covering a collection of Nick Drake songs. In 2009, he collaborated with the Dutch musician Anneke van Giersbergen on the album In Parallel, and in 2013, he issued another collaborative record, this time with Joseph Geraci, titled The Passage.

Cavanagh's second solo album, Memory and Meaning, came out in 2015, and again consisted of covers. He followed it with Monochrome in 2017 and a reimagined version, Monochrome/Colour, in 2020.

=== Weather Systems ===
In 2024, Cavanagh released an album with former Anathema drummer Daniel Cardoso under the name Weather Systems, titled Oceans Without a Shore.

== Discography ==
=== Solo ===
- A Place to Be – A Tribute to Nick Drake (2004)
- Memory and Meaning (2015)
- Monochrome (2017)
- Monochrome/Colour (2020)

=== Weather Systems ===
- Oceans Without a Shore (2024)

=== Collaborations ===
- In Parallel with Anneke van Giersbergen (2009)
- The Passage with Joseph Geraci (2013)
