= Vincent Cavanagh =

English musician (born 1973)

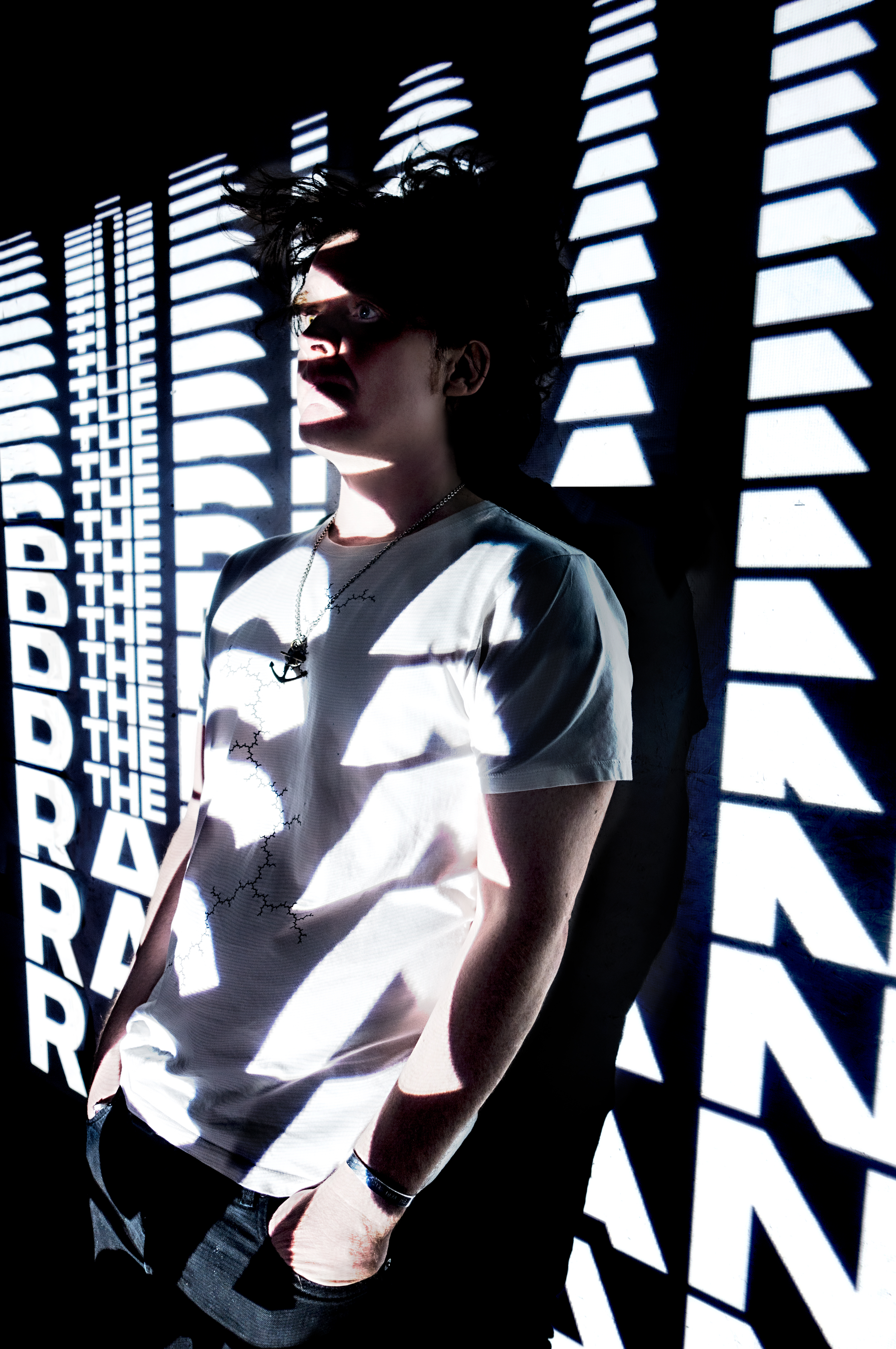

Background information
- Born: Vincent Cavanagh; 29 August 1973 (age 52); Liverpool, England
- Genres: Electronic, contemporary classical, ambient, progressive rock, alternative rock
- Occupations: Musician, producer, songwriter
- Instruments: Vocals, guitar, keyboards
- Years active: 1990–present
- Formerly of: Anathema
- Website: theradicant.co.uk

Vincent Cavanagh (born 29 August 1973 in Liverpool) is a British composer, vocalist, and producer, currently releasing music under the moniker The Radicant. His work spans electronic music, contemporary art, dance and immersive technology, with a focus on interdisciplinary collaboration and experimental sound design.

Prior to The Radicant, Cavanagh was the lead vocalist/rhythm guitarist of the dark rock band Anathema. In 2026, Loudwire ranked him as the 10th greatest progressive rock singer of all time.

== Career ==
=== Anathema ===
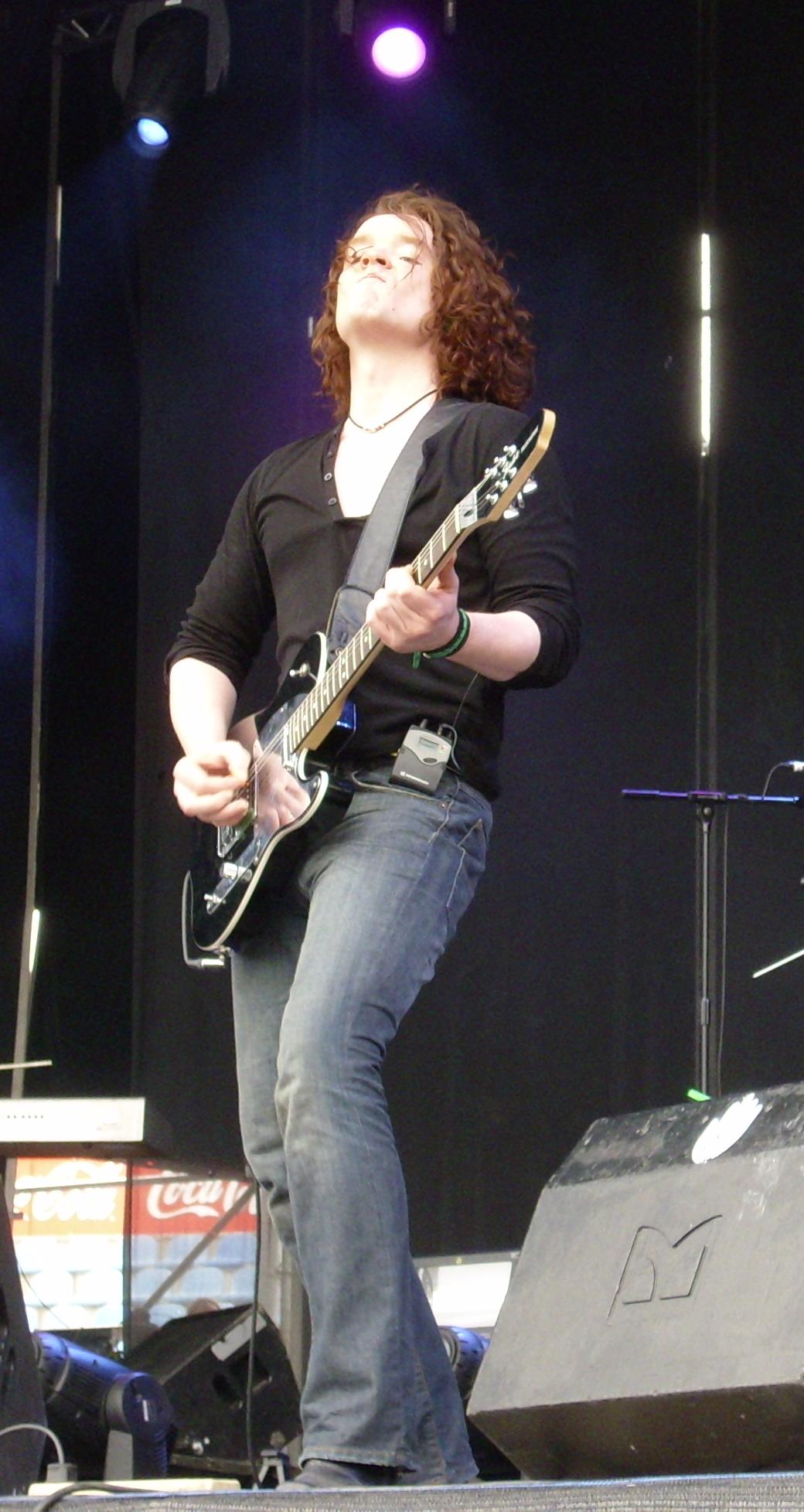
Cavanagh with Anathema in 2007

Vincent Cavanagh is one of the founding members of Anathema. He contributed vocals, guitar, keyboards, songwriting, and production throughout the band's career. Active from the early 1990s until 2020, the band released eleven studio albums, three live albums and two re-work albums, showcasing a steady evolution from metal roots to alternative and progressive rock.

Anathema rapidly gained international recognition and maintained a strong global following through extensive worldwide touring. The band received several accolades, including Album of the Year awards in 2010 and 2017.

In 2020, Vincent made the decision to leave the band to focus on his solo career. As a consequence, the band went on a permanent hiatus.

=== The Radicant ===
With the release of his debut single Zero Blue (NSSMix) in June 2024, Cavanagh launched his solo project The Radicant, marking a shift toward experimental, ambient, and cinematic soundscapes. In July 2024, The Radicant released its first EP, We Ascend.

The project also emphasizes the integration of music with contemporary dance, visual arts, and immersive technologies. Under this moniker, Cavanagh has collaborated with artists and institutions across Europe, composing for installations, performances, and digital environments. The Radicant reflects his evolving interest in creating transdisciplinary experiences beyond traditional music formats.

In 2025, Cavanagh composed the score for a live dance/mixed-reality experience entitled Homecoming, which premiered at The Lowry in Salford, Manchester.

Cavanagh is currently working on The Radicant's full-length debut album, to be released on Kscope.

=== Collaborations and guest vocal appearances ===
In 2013, Vincent Cavanagh performed and co-wrote the lyrics of Welcome Change with Norwegian musician and singer Petter Carlsen. The track, written by the German post-rock band Long Distance Calling, appears on their sixth album, The Flood Inside. The longstanding friendship and collaboration between Vincent and Petter Carlsen is also evident on Petter's acclaimed album Clocks Don't Count, on which both singers perform on the track "Built to Last".

The track "X-Ray" features a guest vocal performance by Vincent Cavanagh. This collaboration appears on the band's fourth studio album, Blackfield IV (2013), which marked a shift in the project's dynamic by incorporating several guest vocalists alongside Aviv Geffen.

In 2016, Vincent worked with UK-based electronic duo Worriedaboutsatan, appearing as a guest vocalist and lyricist on the track The Restless Wing from their album Blank Tape. Additionally, he contributed vocals for In Celebration of Life and The Perfect Wife, two tracks by Italian band Nosound, featured on their fifth album Scintilla.

In 2020, Vincent Cavanagh collaborated with British rock band Crippled Black Phoenix on their album Ellengæst, lending his vocals to two tracks: Lost and House of Fools, the latter of which also features his lyrics.
