= Cradle of Filth discography =

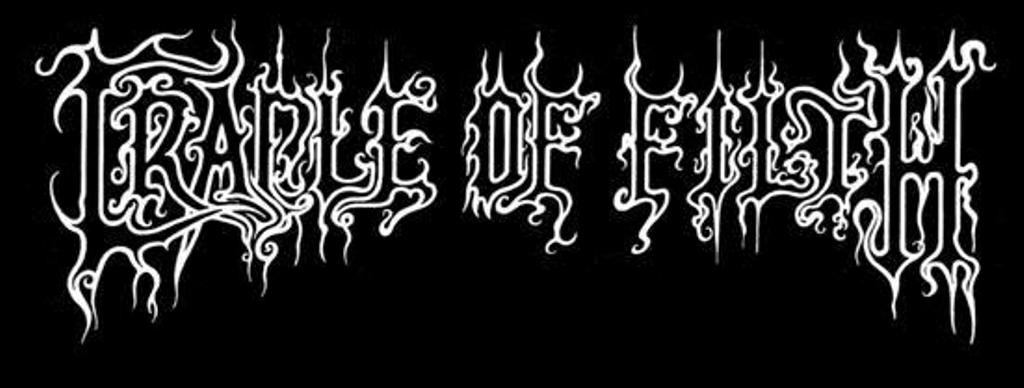
- Studio albums: 14
- Extended plays: 4
- Live albums: 2
- Compilation albums: 2
- Singles: 19
- Video albums: 3
- Music videos: 31

Cradle of Filth was formed in Suffolk, England, in 1991. The band's original members consisted of vocalist Dani Filth, guitarist Paul Ryan, keyboardist Ben Ryan (Paul's brother), bassist John Pritchard and drummer Darren Gardner. With this line-up, Cradle of Filth recorded a demo in 1992, titled Invoking the Unclean. Soon after, they recorded their second demo, Orgiastic Pleasures Foul with new guitarist Robin Eaglestone (aka Robin Graves) and new drummer Was Sarginson. Robin left the band shortly afterwards, but following the departure of John Pritchard, Eaglestone returned to take his place as bassist. Guitarist Paul Allender joined the band at the same time. Following these changes, another demo was recorded, titled Total Fucking Darkness (released commercially in 2014, bolstered with rehearsal sessions and a surviving track from the abandoned Goetia album). Sarginson left the band soon after, paving the way for the entry of drummer Nick Barker.

Cradle of Filth signed with Cacophonous Records in 1994, releasing their debut, The Principle of Evil Made Flesh. A series of differences between band members arose, and there were also problems between the band and the label. Their second work, the EP V Empire or Dark Faerytales in Phallustein, issued in 1996, saw further changes in the line-up. The Ryan brothers and Allender left, and Stuart Anstis (guitarist) and Damien Gregori (keyboardist) joined. While writing material for a new album, the band negotiated their departure from Cacophonous, and in November 1996, signed with European label Music for Nations and guitarist Gian Pyres joined. Later that year, they released Dusk... and Her Embrace, an album that substantially expanded the group's growing cult following.

Their next album was Cruelty and the Beast, released in 1998 featured new keyboardist Les Smith. Next year the group returned with From the Cradle to Enslave, an EP that featured new drummer Adrian Erlandsson (formerly of Sweden's At the Gates and The Haunted), as Barker had departed to join Dimmu Borgir. The band's several lineup changes continued apace as Paul Allender rejoined the group and Martin Powell (ex-Anathema and My Dying Bride) replaced Smith on keyboards for the full-length album Midian, Cradle's last for Music For Nations, which was appropriately released on Halloween 2000. Bitter Suites to Succubi was released on the band's own Abracadaver label in the UK and Spitfire Records in the US in 2001. The group signed to Sony for one album in 2003, adding a choir and orchestra for Damnation and a Day, and moved to Roadrunner Records for 2004's Nymphetamine, 2006's Thornography, and 2008's Godspeed on the Devil's Thunder. 2010's Darkly, Darkly, Venus Aversa was independently released by Abracadaver through Peaceville. In 2015 the band released Hammer of the Witches. In 2016 the original version of Dusk and Her Embrace (recorded with the line-up of The Principle of Evil Made Flesh but abandoned) was released for the first time.

As of 2009, Cradle of Filth had sold about 800,000 albums in the United States and four million records worldwide. Metal Hammer magazine called them the most successful British metal band since Iron Maiden.

== Albums ==
=== Studio albums ===
Title	Album details	Peak chart positions											Sales
Title	Album details	UK	AUS	AUT	BEL	FIN	FRA	GER	NLD	SWE	SWI	US	Sales
The Principle of Evil Made Flesh	Released: 24 February 1994; Label: Cacophonous; Format: CD, LP	—	—	—	—	—	—	—	—	—	—	—	
Dusk and Her Embrace	Released: 18 November 1996; Label: Music for Nations; Format: CD, LP	107	—	—	—	24	—	—	—	—	—	—	WW: 400,000
Cruelty and the Beast	Released: 27 April 1998; Label: Music for Nations; Format: CD, LP	48	—	24	—	13	34	47	37	—	—	—	US: 108,119; WW: 600,000
Midian	Released: 30 October 2000; Label: Music for Nations; Format: CD, LP	63	—	—	47	11	50	30	41	57	—	—	US: 71,971; WW: 450,000
Damnation and a Day	Released: 10 March 2003; Label: Sony; Format: CD, LP	44	47	43	37	10	37	15	51	30	81	140	US: 100,000; WW: 500,000
Nymphetamine	Released: 28 September 2004; Label: Roadrunner; Format: CD, LP	92	53	56	59	32	44	25	29	23	64	89	US: 150,000; WW: 750,000
Thornography	Released: 17 October 2006; Label: Roadrunner; Format: CD, LP	46	35	20	58	16	48	27	48	37	71	66	US: 55,000
Godspeed on the Devil's Thunder	Released: 28 October 2008; Label: Roadrunner; Format: CD, LP	73	46	53	50	24	64	37	53	49	56	48	US: 11,000 (1st week)
Darkly, Darkly, Venus Aversa	Released: 1 November 2010; Label: Peaceville; Format: CD, LP	95	89	50	64	18	55	43	83	—	61	99	US: 5,800 (1st week)
The Manticore and Other Horrors	Released: 29 October 2012; Label: Peaceville; Format: CD, LP	106	—	63	92	24	94	56	—	—	—	96	US: 4,500 (1st week)
Hammer of the Witches	Released: 10 July 2015; Label: Nuclear Blast; Format: CD, LP	44	28	57	28	5	76	23	38	—	46	196	US: 3,575 (1st week)
Cryptoriana – The Seductiveness of Decay	Released: 22 September 2017; Label: Nuclear Blast; Format: CD, LP	50	53	20	35	8	110	15	111	—	24	—	US: 4,000 (1st week)
Existence Is Futile	Released: 22 October 2021; Label: Nuclear Blast; Format: CD, LP	68	82	12	43	4	70	9	38	—	20	—	
The Screaming of the Valkyries	Released: 21 March 2025; Label: Napalm Records; Format: CD, LP	—	—	4	49	29	—	5	—	—	17	—	
"—" denotes releases that did not chart or were not released in that country.

=== Live albums ===
Title	Album details	Peak chart positions	
Title	Album details	UK	FRA
Live Bait for the Dead	Released: 19 August 2002; Label: Abracadaver; Format: CD	175	134
Live at Dynamo Open Air 1997	Released: 31 May 2019; Label: Fret; Format: CD	—	—
Trouble and Their Double Lives	Released: 28 April 2023; Label: Napalm; Format: CD	—	—
"—" denotes a recording that did not chart or was not released in that territory.

=== Compilation albums ===
Title	Album details	Peak chart positions	
Title	Album details	UK	GER
Lovecraft & Witch Hearts	Released: 13 May 2002; Label: Music for Nations; Format: CD	96	95
Midnight in the Labyrinth	Released: 21 April 2012; Label: Peaceville; Format: CD	—	—
"—" denotes a recording that did not chart or was not released in that territory.

== Extended plays ==
Title	Album details	Peak chart positions					
Title	Album details	UK	AUT	FIN	FRA	GER	NLD
V Empire or Dark Faerytales in Phallustein	Released: 22 April 1996; Label: Cacophonous; Format: CD, LP	—	—	—	—	—	—
From the Cradle to Enslave	Released: 2 November 1999; Label: Music for Nations; Format: CD, LP	84	—	—	—	—	—
Bitter Suites to Succubi	Released: 18 June 2001; Label: Abracadaver; Format: CD, LP	63	36	17	89	45	73
Evermore Darkly	Released: 17 October 2011; Label: Peaceville; Format: CD	—	—	—	177	—	—
"—" denotes a recording that did not chart or was not released in that territory.

== Demos ==
Title	Album details
Invoking the Unclean	Released: 20 January 1992; Label: Self-released; Formats: CS
Orgiastic Pleasures Foul	Released: February 1992; Label: Self-released; Formats: CS
Total Fucking Darkness	Released: 1992, 19 May 2014 (rerelease); Label: Tombstone Records, Mordgrimm (rerelease); Formats: CS, CD, LP
Dusk and Her Embrace: The Original Sin	Released: 8 July 2016; Label: Cacophonous; Format: CD

== Singles ==
Year	Title	Peak chart positions		Album
Year	Title	UK	FRA	Album
1998	"Twisted Nails of Faith"	—	—	Cruelty and the Beast
2000	"Her Ghost in the Fog / Dance Macabre"	—	—	Midian
2001	"No Time to Cry"	—	—	Bitter Suites to Succubi
2003	"Babalon A.D. (So Glad for the Madness)"	35	—	Damnation and a Day
2003	"Mannequin"	—	—	Damnation and a Day
2004	"Nymphetamine"	—	—	Nymphetamine
2005	"Devil Woman"	—	—	Nymphetamine
2006	"Temptation / Dirge Inferno"	—	—	Thornography
2007	"The Foetus of a New Day Kicking"	—	—	Thornography
2008	"Tragic Kingdom"	—	—	Godspeed on the Devil's Thunder
2008	"Honey and Sulphur"	—	98	Godspeed on the Devil's Thunder
2009	"The Death of Love"	—	—	Godspeed on the Devil's Thunder
2010	"Forgive Me Father (I Have Sinned)"	—	—	Darkly, Darkly Venus Aversa
2011	"Lilith Immaculate"	—	—	Darkly, Darkly Venus Aversa
2012	"Frost on Her Pillow"	—	—	The Manticore and Other Horrors
2013	"For Your Vulgar Delectation"	—	—	The Manticore and Other Horrors
2015	"Right Wing of the Garden Triptych"	—	—	Hammer of the Witches
2015	"Blackest Magick in Practice"	—	—	Hammer of the Witches
2017	"Heartbreak and Seance"	—	—	Cryptoriana - The Seductiveness of Decay
2021	"Crawling King Chaos"	—	—	Existence Is Futile
2021	"Necromantic Fantasies"	—	—	Existence Is Futile
2024	"Malignant Perfection"	—	—	The Screaming of the Valkyries
2025	"To Live Deliciously"	—	—	The Screaming of the Valkyries
2025	"White Hellebore"	—	—	The Screaming of the Valkyries
"—" denotes releases that did not chart or were not released in that country.

== Covers ==
Cradle of Filth are well known for their extensive list of covers (usually included on the special editions).

Year	Title	Album	Original artist(s)
1996	"Hell Awaits"	Dusk... and Her Embrace	Slayer
1998	"Sodomy and Lust"	Cruelty and the Beast	Sodom
1998	"Black Metal"	Cruelty and the Beast	Venom
1998	"Hallowed Be Thy Name"	Cruelty and the Beast	Iron Maiden
1999	"Sleepless"	From the Cradle to Enslave	Anathema
1999	"Death Comes Ripping"	From the Cradle to Enslave	Misfits
1999	"Dawn of Eternity"	From the Cradle to Enslave	Massacre
2000	"For Those Who Died"	Midian	Sabbat
2001	"The Fire Still Burns"	Twisted Forever	Twisted Sister
2001	"No Time to Cry"	Bitter Suites to Succubi	The Sisters of Mercy
2004	"Devil Woman"	Nymphetamine	Cliff Richard
2004	"Mr. Crowley"	Nymphetamine	Ozzy Osbourne
2004	"Bestial Lust"	Nymphetamine	Bathory
2006	"Temptation"	Thornography	Heaven 17
2006	"Stay"	Thornography	Shakespears Sister
2006	"Halloween II"	Thornography; Underworld: Evolution	Samhain
2008	"Into the Crypt of Rays"	Godspeed on the Devil's Thunder	Celtic Frost
2017	"Alison Hell"	Cryptoriana – The Seductiveness of Decay	Annihilator

== Videos ==
=== Video albums ===
Title	Video details	Peak chart positions	Sales	Certifications
Title	Video details	SWE	Sales	Certifications
PanDaemonAeon	Released: 5 October 1999; Label: Music for Nations; Format: VHS, DVD	—		
Heavy, Left-Handed and Candid	Released: 25 November 2001; Label: Abracadaver; Format: VHS, DVD	16	WW: 100,000+	
Peace Through Superior Firepower	Released: 22 November 2005; Label: Roadrunner; Format: DVD	12	US: 2,000 (1st week)	CAN: Gold
"—" denotes a recording that did not chart or was not released in that territory.

=== Music videos ===
Year	Title	Director
1999	"From the Cradle to Enslave"	Alex Chandon
2000	"Her Ghost in the Fog"	Alex Chandon
2001	"Born in a Burial Gown"	Alex Chandon
2001	"No Time to Cry"	Alex Chandon
2001	"Scorched Earth Erotica"	Alex Chandon
2003	"Babalon A.D. (So Glad for the Madness)"	W.I.Z.
2003	"Mannequin"	Thomas Mignone
2003	"The Promise of Fever"	Paul Allender
2004	"Nymphetamine"	Dani Jacobs
2006	"Temptation"	Adam Mason
2007	"Tonight in Flames"	Paul Allender
2007	"The Foetus of a New Day Kicking"	Lee Lennox
2008	"Honey and Sulphur"	Michael Maxxis
2009	"The Death of Love"	Will Wright
2010	"Forgive Me Father (I Have Sinned)"	Dani Jacobs
2011	"Lilith Immaculate"	Ross Bolidai
2012	"Frost On Her Pillow"	Stuart Birchall
2013	"For Your Vulgar Delectation"	Ross Bolidai
2015	"Right Wing of the Garden Triptych"	Sam Scott-Hunter
2015	"Blackest Magick In Practice"	Sam Scott-Hunter
2016	"Sleepless"	Joe Latham
2017	"Heartbreak And Seance"	Arthur Berzinsh
2017	"You Will Know The Lion By His Claw" (Lyric Video)	—
2017	"Achingly Beautiful" (Lyric Video)	—
2021	"Crawling King Chaos"	Vicente Cordero
2021	"Necromantic Fantasies"	Vicente Cordero
2022	"How Many Tears To Nurture A Rose?"	Vicente Cordero
2023	"She is A Fire"	Vicente Cordero
2024	"Malignant Perfection"	Vicente Cordero
2025	"To Live Deliciously"	Vicente Cordero
2025	"White Hellebore"	Shaun Hodson

== See also ==
- Cradle of Fear
- The Gospel of Filth
- Dominator

== Footnotes ==
1. Re-released in 2007 by Peaceville Records, with the new title of Eleven Burial Masses. The CD & DVD package consists of the entire first disc of Live Bait for the Dead, plus the DVD Heavy, Left-Handed and Candid without its original bonus features.
