= List of horror films of 1991 =

A list of horror films released in 1991.

Title	Director(s)	Cast	Country	Notes	Ref.
964 Pinocchio	Shozin Fukui	Hage Suzuki, Onn Chan	Japan	Released in U.K. as Screams of Blasphemy	
976-EVIL 2: The Astral Factor	Jim Wynorski	Monique Gabrielle	United States	Sequel to 976-EVIL (1989)	
Alligator II: The Mutation	Jon Hess	Joseph Bologna, Woody Brown, Richard Lynch	United States		
Bad Karma	Alex Chandon	Carmel, Alex Chandon, Dan Barton	United Kingdom	36-minute short film	
Blood Massacre	Don Dohler	George Stover, Robin London, Jamie DiAngelo	United States		
Blood Ties	Jim McBride	Patrick Bauchau, Gregory Scott Cummins, Michael C. Gwynne	United States	Television movie	
Body Parts	Eric Red	Jeff Fahey, Lindsay Duncan, Brad Dourif	United States	Based on a French novel Choice Cuts	
The Boneyard	James Cummins	Ed Nelson, Norman Fell, Phyllis Diller	United States		
Campfire Tales	William Cooke, Paul Talbot	Gunnar Hansen, Robin Roberts	United States	Not to be confused with Campfire Tales (1997)	
Cape Fear	Martin Scorsese	Robert De Niro, Nick Nolte, Jessica Lange	United States		
Cast a Deadly Spell	Joseph Dougherty	Fred Ward, Clancy Brown, Julianne Moore	United States	Television film H.P. Lovecraft elements	
Child of Darkness, Child of Light	Marina Sargenti	Anthony John Denison, Brad Davis, Sydney Penny	United States	Television film Based on a James Patterson novel Virgin	
Children of the Night	Tony Randel	Karen Black, Garrett Morris, Ami Dolenz	United States		
Child's Play 3	Jack Bender	Justin Whalin, Perrey Reeves, Jeremy Sylvers	United States	Third film of Child's Play franchise	
The Devil's Daughter (a.k.a. The Sect)	Michele Soavi	Kelly Curtis, Herbert Lom, Mariangela Giordano	Italy	Produced by Dario Argento	
Dolly Dearest	Maria Lease	Denise Crosby, Sam Bottoms, Rip Torn	United States		
Freddy's Dead: The Final Nightmare	Rachel Talalay	Robert Englund, Lisa Zane, Shon Greenblatt	United States	Sixth film of A Nightmare on Elm Street franchise	
Ghoulies III: Ghoulies Go to College	John Carl Buechler	Evan Mackenzie, Eva LaRue, Kevin McCarthy, Matthew Lillard	United States	Third film of Ghoulies film series; Released direct to video	
The Haunted	Robert Mandel	Sally Kirkland, Jeffrey DeMunn	United States	Television film	
HauntedWeen	Robertson Doug	Brian Blakely, Blake Pickett, Ethan Adler	United States		
The Haunting Fear	Fred Olen Ray	Brinke Stevens, Jan-Michael Vincent, Michael Berryman, Robert Quarry, Robert Clarke	United States		
Hiruko the Goblin	Shinya Tsukamoto	Kenji Sawada, Masaki Kudou	Japan		
Howling VI: The Freaks	Hope Perello	Brendan Hughes, Bruce Payne, Michele Matheson	United States		
I Hate You... Not	Eiichi Uchida	Takeshi Itō, Kenjirō Kawanaka, Kiyomi Ito	Japan		
Immortal Sins	Herve Hachuel	Cliff De Young, Shari Shattuck, Maryam d'Abo	Spain		
Katabi Ko'y Mamaw	Mike Relon Makiling	Reycard Duet, Donita Rose	Philippines		
Mikadroid: Robokill Beneath Discoclub Layla	Satoo Haraguchi, Tomo'o Haraguchi	Sandayuu Dokumamushi, Yoriko Douguchi, Masatō Ibu	Japan		
The Moonlight Sonata	Olli Soinio	Tiina Björkman	Finland		
Nekromantik 2	Jörg Buttgereit	Monika M., Beatrice Manowski, Florian Koerner von Gustorf	Germany		
Nudist Colony of the Dead	Mark Pirro	Deborah Stern, Tony Ciocetti, Rachel Latt	United States	Shot on Super 8 film	
Omen IV: The Awakening	Jorge Montesi, Dominique Othenin-Girard	Faye Grant, Michael Woods, Michael Lerner	Canada	Final film of The Omen franchise on television	
The People Under the Stairs	Wes Craven	Brandon Adams, Everett McGill, Wendy Robie	United States		
The Pit and the Pendulum	Stuart Gordon	Lance Henriksen, Mark Margolis, Jeffrey Combs, Oliver Reed	United States	Based on stories by Edgar Allan Poe	
Popcorn	Alan Ormsby, Mark Herrier	Dee Wallace, Karen Witter, Jill Schoelen	United States		
Puppet Master II	David W. Allen	Elizabeth Maclellan, Collin Bernsen	United States		
Puppet Master III: Toulon's Revenge	David DeCoteau	Guy Rolfe, Richard Lynch, Ian Abercrombie	United States		
The Resurrected	Dan O'Bannon	John Terry, Jane Sibbett, Chris Sarandon	United States	Based on the works of H. P. Lovecraft	
Revenge of Billy the Kid	Jim Groom	Norman Mitchell, Elaine Ives-Cameron, Frank Scantori	United Kingdom		
The Runestone	Willard Carroll	Peter Riegert, Joan Severance, Lawrence Tierney	United States		
The Secret of Sarah Tombelaine	Daniel Lacambre	Irène Jacob, Marc de Jonge, Jean-Paul Roussillon	France		
Scanners II: The New Order	Christian Duguay	David Hewlett, Deborah Raffin, Yvan Ponton	Canada		
Scary True Stories: Ten Haunting Tales from the Japanese Underground	Norio Tsuruta	Rie Kondō, Yumi Gotō	Japan		
Science Crazed	Ron Switzer	Catherine Bruhier, Donna Switzer, Yvonne Valnea	Canada; United States		
Servants of Twilight	Jeffrey Obrow	Bruce Greenwood, Grace Zabriskie, Carel Struycken	United States	Based on a Dean Koontz novel	
Shake, Rattle & Roll III	Peque Gallaga, Lore Reyes	Kris Aquino, Ogie Alcasid, Rosemarie Gil, Manilyn Reynes, Joey Marquez, Richardo Cepeda, Ai-Ai delas Alas, Janice de Belen, Gina Alajar, Joel Torre, Armida Siguion-Reyna, Subas Herrero, Inday Badiday	Philippines		
The Silence of the Lambs	Jonathan Demme	Jodie Foster, Anthony Hopkins	United States		
Silent Night, Deadly Night 5: The Toy Maker	Martin Kitrosser	Tracy Fraim, Catherine Schreiber, Clint Howard	United States	Final film of Silent Night, Deadly Night film series	
Sometimes They Come Back	Tom McLoughlin	Tim Matheson, Brooke Adams, William Sanderson	United States	Television film Based on a story by Stephen King	
Sorority Babes in the Dance-A-Thon of Death	Todd Sheets	Holly Starr, J.T. Taube, Lisa Krueger	United States		
Steel and Lace	Ernest D. Farino	Clare Wren, Bruce Davison, Stacy Haiduk, David Naughton	United States		
Subspecies	Ted Nicolaou	Anders Hove, Laura Tate, Michael Watson	United States		
The Unborn	Rodman Flender	James Karen, Brooke Adams, Lisa Kudrow, Kathy Griffin	United States	Produced by Roger Corman (uncredited)	
Voodoo Dawn	Steven Fierberg	Tony Todd, Raymond St. Jacques, Gina Gershon	United States		
Witchcraft III: The Kiss of Death	Rachel Feldman	Charles Solomon Jr., Alexa Jago, Ahmad Reese	United States		

== Sources ==
- Dendle, Peter (2010). The Zombie Movie Encyclopedia. Jefferson, North Carolina: McFarland. ISBN 978-0-7864-9288-6.
- Hardy, Phil, ed. (1995). The Overlook Film Encyclopedia. Vol. 3. Overlook Press. ISBN 0-87951-624-0.
- Muir, John Kenneth (2011). Horror Films of the 1990s. Jefferson, North Carolina: McFarland. ISBN 978-0-786-48480-5.
- Weldon, Michael (1996). The Psychotronic Video Guide To Film. New York City, New York: Macmillan. ISBN 978-0-312-13149-4.
- Young, R. G. (2000). The Encyclopedia of Fantastic Film: Ali Baba to Zombies. Hal Leonard Corporation. ISBN 1-55783-269-2.
