= Carmel discography =

Discography

- Studio albums: 9
- Live albums: 4
- Compilation albums: 1
- Singles: 24
- Video albums: 2

This is the discography of British jazz and soul band Carmel.

== Albums ==
=== Studio albums ===
Title	Album details	Peak chart positions							
Title	Album details	UK	UK Indie	AUS	FIN	FRA	GER	NL	SWI
Carmel	Released: September 1982; Label: Red Flame; Formats: 12" mini-album	94	8	—	—	—	—	—	—
The Drum Is Everything	Released: March 1984; Label: London; Formats: LP, MC	19	—	—	—	—	—	—	—
The Falling	Released: September 1986; Label: London; Formats: CD, LP, MC	88	—	55	—	6	—	66	—
Everybody's Got a Little...Soul	Released: 2 November 1987; Label: London; Formats: CD, LP, MC	—	—	85	35	23	—	—	19
Set Me Free	Released: September 1989; Label: London; Formats: CD, LP, MC	—	—	—	—	—	45	—	10
Good News	Released: 17 August 1992; Label: EastWest; Formats: CD, LP, MC	—	—	—	—	—	—	—	—
World's Gone Crazy	Released: January 1995; Label: EastWest; Formats: CD, MC	—	—	—	—	—	—	—	—
Strictly Piaf	Released: 5 December 2011; Label: Secret; Formats: CD, digital download	—	—	—	—	—	—	—	—
Wild Country	Released: 25 February 2022; Label: Secret; Formats: CD, digital download	—	—	—	—	—	—	—	—
"—" denotes releases that did not chart or were not released in that territory.

=== Live albums ===
Title	Album details
Live in Paris	Released: 1997; Label: Musidisc; Formats: CD
Live at Ronnie Scott's	Released: August 1998; Label: Sanctuary; Formats: CD
More More More	Released: 31 July 2009; Label: Secret; Formats: CD, digital download
Brave New Waves Session	Released: 4 May 2018; Label: Artoffact; Formats: CD, digital download

=== Compilation albums ===
Title	Album details
Collected	Released: 1990; Label: London; Formats: CD; Reissued in 1997 as The Best of Carmel

=== Video albums ===
Title	Album details
Collected	Released: 1990; Label: London; Formats: VHS
More More More. Live	Released: July 2004; Label: Secret; Formats: DVD

== Singles ==
Title	Year	Peak chart positions							Album
Title	Year	UK	UK Indie	AUS	BE (FL)	FRA	IRE	NL	Album
"Storm"	1982	—	13	—	—	—	—	—	Carmel
"Bad Day"	1983	15	—	—	—	—	21	—	The Drum Is Everything
"Willow Weep for Me"	1983	79	—	—	—	—	—	—	The Drum Is Everything
"More, More, More"	1984	23	—	—	—	—	—	—	The Drum Is Everything
"The Drum Is Everything" (Japan-only release)	1984	—	—	—	—	—	—	—	The Drum Is Everything
"I'm Not Afraid of You"	1985	121	—	—	—	—	—	—	The Falling
"Sally"	1986	60	—	39	28	5	—	37	The Falling
"Mercy (Don't Leave Me This Way)"	1986	190	—	—	—	—	—	—	The Falling
"J'oublierai ton nom" (with Johnny Hallyday)	1987	—	—	—	—	7	—	—	Gang (by Hallyday)
"It's All in the Game"	1987	81	—	—	—	47	—	—	Everybody's Got a Little...Soul
"Let Me Know" (Australia-only release)	1987	—	—	—	—	—	—	—	The Falling
"Every Little Bit"	1988	—	—	—	—	—	—	—	Everybody's Got a Little...Soul
I Have Fallen in Love (Je suis tombée amoureuse)"	1989	100	—	—	—	—	—	—	Set Me Free
"You Can Have Him"	1990	76	—	—	—	—	—	—	Set Me Free
"I'm Over You"	1990	—	—	—	—	—	—	—	Set Me Free
"And I Take It for Granted"	1990	—	—	—	—	—	—	—	Set Me Free
"You're on My Mind" (Carmel McCourt solo with Rossana Casale; Italy-only release)	1991	—	—	—	—	—	—	—	Brividi (by Casale)
"You're on My Mind"	1992	95	—	—	—	—	—	—	Good News
"You're All I Need"	1992	134	—	—	—	—	—	—	Good News
"If You Don't Come Back"	1994	—	—	—	—	—	—	—	World's Gone Crazy
"La complainte pour Sainte Cathérine" (Carmel McCourt solo with Jo Lemaire; Belgium-only release)	1994	—	—	—	31	—	—	—	Liverpool (by Lemaire)
"Sous le ciel de Paris"	2011	—	—	—	—	—	—	—	Strictly Piaf
"Second Wife Blues"/"Sad Situation"	2015	—	—	—	—	—	—	—	Wild Country
"Shoe Shufflin'"	2016	—	—	—	—	—	—	—	Non-album single
"—" denotes releases that did not chart or were not released in that territory.
