= Bad Karma =

Bad Karma may refer to:

- Bad Karma (1991 film)
- Bad Karma (2002 film)
- Bad Karma (EP), an extended play by Gabbie Hanna, or the title song
- "Bad Karma", a song by Warren Zevon from the 1987 album Sentimental Hygiene
- "Bad Karma", a 2014 song by Axel Thesleff
- Bad Karma (Elaeis guineensis), an epiallele in the genetics of the most common oilpalm

== See also ==
- Karma (disambiguation)
