= Night Pastor =

- Directed by: Alex Chandon
- Written by: Neil Keenan
- Produced by: Neil Keenan
- Starring: Alex Chandon
- Cinematography: Alex Chandon
- Edited by: Alex Chandon
- Production company: Shape-Shifting Films
- Distributed by: SOI Film Entertainment
- Release date: 1998
- Running time: 9 minutes
- Country: United Kingdom
- Language: English

Night Pastor is a short horror film directed by Alex Chandon and stars Neil Keenan and Matt Russel.

== Plot ==
The Night Pastor, a Jesus blending, prevails in the city by force of law and order! The long-haired priest, with God's blessing and lead-based arguments going against the prevailing sins of his city. The meet while the sinner to heaven faster than they can "say" Amen, the pastor should preach to empty crowds.

== Cast ==
- Alex Chandon
- Neil Keenan
- Matt Russel

== Release ==
The movie is part of the SOI Film Entertainment DVD, which was released with Chainsaw Scumfuck, Drillbit and Bad Karma on one Disc.
