= James McIlroy (musician) =

British musician (born 1977)

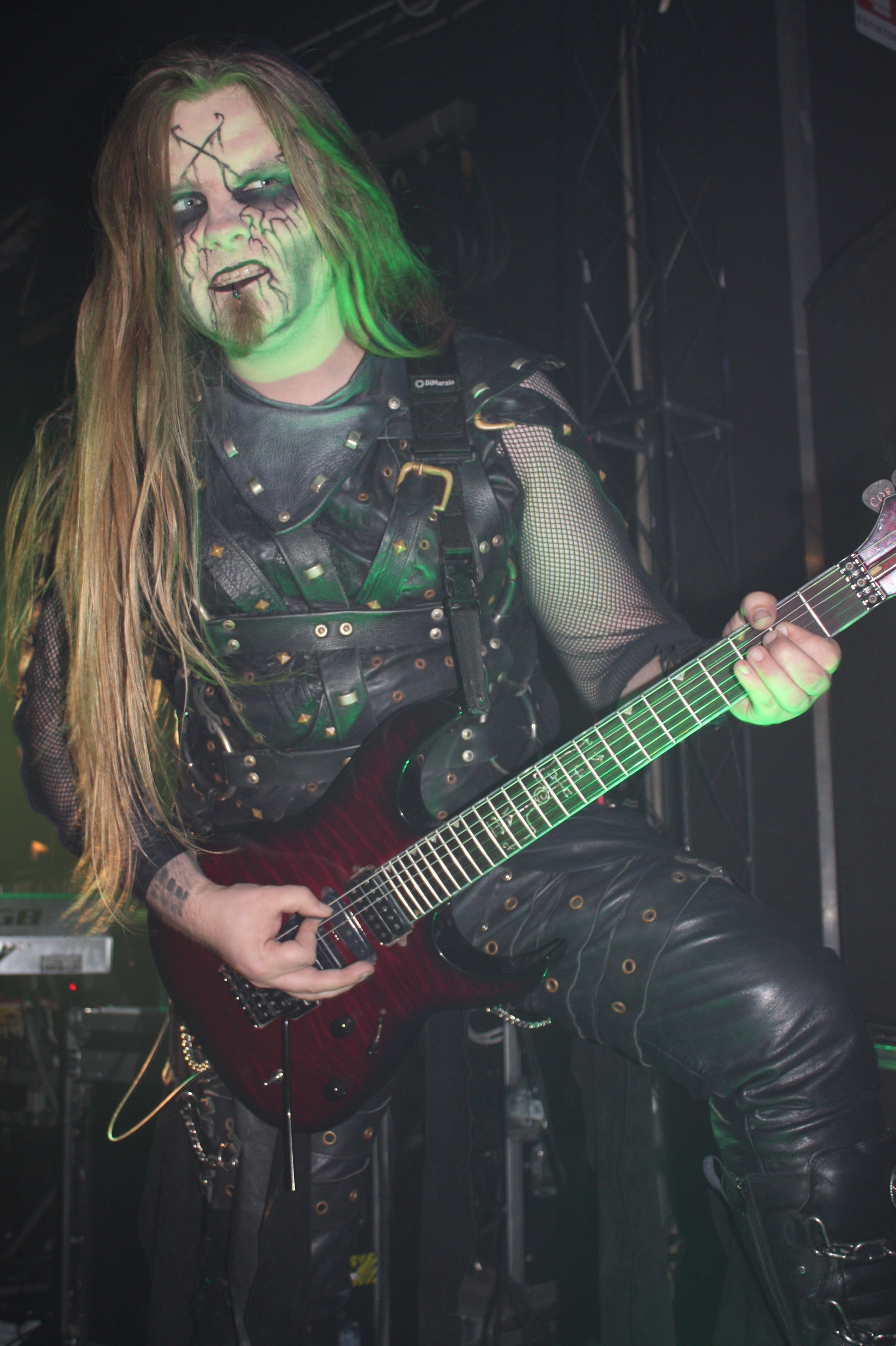
- McIlroy with Cradle of Filth in 2011

Background information
- Born: 7 December 1977 (age 48); England
- Genres: Extreme metal
- Occupations: Musician, songwriter
- Instrument: Guitar
- Member of: Cradle of Filth

James McIlroy (born 7 December 1977) is an English heavy metal guitarist. He was born in King's Lynn, Norfolk, grew up in Belgium before returning to England in 1996. He started his professional playing career in 2002.

== Career ==
A guitarist in the English extreme metal band Cradle of Filth from 2003 to 2005 and then from 2009 until 2014, McIlroy played on the Nymphetamine album and special edition, as well as appearing on the Mannequin and Peace Through Superior Firepower DVDs.

He originally auditioned for the position in late 2002, and toured extensively for the Damnation and a Day and Nymphetamine albums, as well as appearances at the 2003 Ozzfest and Viva La Bam (2005), before leaving to pursue academia and work on other projects, his own band Chaosanct, as well as becoming part of the Order of Apollyon and English goth rock band NFD. In 2009, he returned for the second leg of Cradle of Filth's European Godspeed on the Devil's Thunder Tour.

McIlroy currently plays in his own bands Chaosanct, Order of Apollyon and NFD. He is currently working on the debut Chaosanct album as well as new material for all bands.

== Discography ==
- Nymphetamine – Cradle of Filth (2004)
- I of Goliath – Chaosanct (2008)
- The Ascendance of Impurity – Chaosanct (2009)
- March of the Titans – Gravil (2010)
- The Flesh – Order of Apollyon (2010)
- Darkly, Darkly, Venus Aversa – Cradle of Filth (2010)
- Evermore Darkly – Cradle of Filth (2011)
- The Sword and the Dagger – Order of Apollyon (2015)

== Videography ==
- Peace Through Superior Firepower
- Mannequin
- Evermore Darkly
