= Kontour =

- Kontour 2010

Background information
- Genres: Electronic, industrial
- Instrument(s): Synthesiser, drum machine
- Labels: Some Bizzare

Kontour is an English electronic music artist, signed to Some Bizzare Records.

== Background ==
Early work included recordings of distorted telephone calls and late night television. He uses a range of vintage recording equipment and analog synthesisers, electronic percussion and drum machines. In 2007 the Protect & Survive EP was released on the White Label Music record label. This early work was created using little or no percussion instead using a Doepfer analogue sequencer to create simple, minimal rhythms. Soon after the release of the EP Kontour was approached by Some Bizzare Records. The label owner, Stevo Pearce (ex-manager of Soft Cell), wanted to include The Kennedy Syndrome on a new compilation album he was compiling titled Some Bizzare Double Album. This led to the recording of a new studio album for the record label. In 2008 Kontour released the album Scanners on Some Bizzare Records, Stevo Pearce is credited as executive producer of the album. The album was released after the "Protect & Survive" EP and moved on from the minimal sounds of tracks like Shark Cage. The album was recorded using no MIDI instruments or personal computers, instead primitive music sequencers, Roland RE-501 tape effects and a Roland CR-78 Drum Machine were used. The vocals on the album where treated like a sound source and manipulated with audio effects.
Kontour worked with the American group Lucid Sketchmaster collaborating on the album The Seed. Kontour featured on the track "God Come Tell Me" contributing lyrics and "music construction". In 2012 Kontour contributed a recording to a project titled A Broadcast to the Trees. The project involved a selection of unreleased music, contributed by various artists, which was broadcast via an FM transmitter into the Galloway Forest. The broadcast was not archived or streamed online. The only people who were able to hear the transmission would have been in a small radius of the forest at the time. After the music was transmitted it was deleted. Other artists who contributed to this project included Gareth Jones, Martyn Ware and Dave Ball.

== Scanners recording for Some Bizzare Records (2008) ==
In 2007 Kontour began recording sessions for Some Bizzare Records. The album was completed at the end half of 2007 being mixed and mastered for its 2008 release date. Mastering took place at The Exchange in London and was performed by Simon Davey who has mastered bands like Laibach, Aphex Twin and Depeche Mode. Scanners was released on 4 February 2008. It was largely composed of experimental, electronic songs. Songs structures were improvised incorporating a less than disciplined approach. The release had mixed responses, some listeners found the album too experimental. While others labeled it "original".

== Discography ==
=== Albums ===
- 2007 – Protect & Survive (White Label Music)
- 2008 – Scanners (Some Bizzare Records)
- 2008 – Some Bizzare Double Album (Some Bizzare Records) – The Kennedy Syndrome
- 2014 – Monochrome (Sub-human)

=== Collaborations ===
- 2008 – Lucid Sketchmaster – The Seed (Some Bizzare Records) – God Come Tell Me
- 2008 – Rev Spook – Big Spirit – Unbreakable
- 2011 – The Dark Poets Vs Kontour – Breakbeat Halloween 2012. From The Dark Poets Cradle of Fear E.P.
