= Babalon A.D. (So Glad for the Madness) =

Video by Cradle of Filth
- Released: 3 March 2003
- Genre: Extreme metal
- Label: Sony

Cradle of Filth chronology
Heavy, Left-Handed and Candid (2002)	Babalon A.D. (So Glad for the Madness) (2003)	Mannequin (2003)

Professional ratings
Review scores
Source	Rating
CMJ New Music Report	favourable

Babalon A.D. (So Glad for the Madness) is a DVD single by Cradle of Filth, released on 3 March 2003 by record label Sony.

It reached number 35 in the UK Singles Chart.

== Content ==
Babalon is not a misspelling of Babylon, but refers to the "Scarlet Woman", "Great Mother" or "Mother of Abominations" from Aleister Crowley's mystical system ("Mother of Abominations" is also the name of track 13 on Cradle's Nymphetamine album).

== Music video ==
The video is an homage to Pier Paolo Pasolini's famous final film Salò, or the 120 Days of Sodom, based on the Marquis de Sade's novel.

The video begins with a closeup of Dani Filth's face hidden in the shadows. The camera cuts to a young maid in a restroom who notices a digital camcorder, sits down in a toilet stall and looks at the camera for any footage present. The video on the camcorder shows the Cradle of Filth band members in something like an empty dance hall, sharply dressed, systematically abusing and humiliating half a dozen young men and women, while Dani directs proceedings with a megaphone. Near the video's end, Dani is seen looking at himself in an antique mirror, which he then spins around and points at the camera operator, revealing that the maid herself was recording the band's activities. In the restroom, the maid looks horrified. We then cut back to the torture room, now vacant and poorly lit, to find the maid alone with the libertine tormentors, and forced into a chair as Dani takes the camera and another band member takes a director's clapperboard labelled "Pandora's Box." The young lady weeps as she is taunted, yelled at, and ridiculed. Back in the bathroom, the footage on the digital camcorder cuts off and the maid looks up with terror etched on her face. The video ends with what appears to be a static-filled picture, but Dani's face can be seen in it.

== Track listing ==
1. "Babalon A.D. (So Glad for the Madness)" — 05:38
2. "Serpent Tongue" — 05:10
3. "Freakshow Gallery" — 5:50
4. "Merchandise Details" — 1:18
5. "Band Biography" — 10:02
