= Gian Pyres =

British guitarist (born 1973)

- Also known as: Gian Pires
- Born: Gianpiero Giuseppe Piras; 20 October 1973 (age 52)
- Origin: London, England
- Genres: Death metal; black metal; gothic metal; doom metal
- Instrument: Guitar
- Formerly of: Cradle of Filth

Gian Pyres (born Gianpiero Giuseppe Piras, 20 October 1973) is an English guitarist, best known for his work with extreme metal band Cradle of Filth for which he recorded guitars for Cruelty and the Beast (1998), Midian (2000), Bitter Suites to Succubi (2001) and Lovecraft & Witch Hearts (2002). He appeared on their DVDs Heavy, Left-Handed and Candid (2001), Live Bait for the Dead (2001), and appeared in Alex Chandon's Cradle of Fear (2001). In addition, he has appeared in music videos for From the Cradle to Enslave (1999), Her Ghost in the Fog (2000), Born in a Burial Gown (2001), and Scorched Earth Erotica (2002). He also appeared with Cradle of Filth on the BBC's Living with the Enemy (1998).

Other live and recording appearances include Ship of Fools, Solstice Lamentations EP (1994) and Halcyon (1995), and Dragonlord as touring guitarist (2005–06). He also recorded as a guest guitarist for Bal-Sagoth on A Black Moon Broods Over Lemuria (1995), Christian Death on Born Again Anti-Christian (2000), Extreme Noise Terror on Being and Nothing (2001) and Italian symphonic black metal band Theatres des Vampires on Vampyrìsme... (2003). He played for The Rotted (formerly known as Gorerotted) until November 2009, co-wrote and recorded Get Dead Or Die Trying (2008), and featured on the video Nothing But a Nosebleed. He is a member of Screamin' Daemon, appearing on the album Wrath of the Genocide Gods, and is the touring guitarist with former Cradle of Filth bandmate Sarah Jezebel Deva's solo band.

He is endorsed by PRS Guitars and Peavey Electronics.

Gian Piras has also worked for game developer The Creative Assembly/SEGA, in Sussex, England on Rome: Total War, Rome Total War: Barbarian Invasion and Medieval 2: Total War. He also represented The Creative Assembly as a games technician on BBC2's Time Commanders. He lives in Canada with his wife.

== Equipment ==
- PRS Guitars – Private Stock Custom Pyres Edition
- Gibson Guitars – Standard SG
- Peavey Amps – 6505
- Peavey or Marshall cabinets
- Effects by BOSS and Line 6
