= The Dark Poets =

Industrial music group

Background information
- Genres: Industrial, experimental
- Years active: 2001–present
- Label: Some Bizzare [Silvascreen] [Jambalay]
- Members: The Dark Poets
- Website: https://www.darkpoets.com

The Dark Poets are an industrial music group who originally rose to prominence with their soundtrack for Alex Chandon's cult horror movie Cradle of Fear. The Cradle of Fear soundtrack was released by Silvascreen Records in the UK and Silva America in 2001 (SSD 1148.)

They eventually gained the attention of Some Bizzare label boss Stevo Pearce signing the Dark Poets to Some Bizzare Records in 2006.

In 2006, the Dark Poets featured on Some Bizzare compilation titled Redefining the Prologue with their "Thrash Techno" track 'Crazy'.("A Bad Trip Inverse of Handbag House" – Mike Barnes – Wire Magazine)

The Dark Poets emerged to work with director Alex Chandon again in 2006 on his award-winning short film "Borderline".

Gary Lucas album Beyond the Pale features many Dark Poets productions. as well as a number of Gary Lucas tracks and collaborations. The album was released to good reviews, and included a remix on the album by British Techno legends The Grid (Richard Norris/Dave Ball).

Gary Lucas: (Electric guitar, Electronics); Sarah Hilliard: The Dark Poets (Vocals); J. R. Hunter: The Dark Poets (Vocals, Keyboards, Samples, Breaks, Programming and Electronic Production).

Produced by J. R. Hunter (The Dark Poets); published by Gary Lucas Music BMI / James R Hunter / Sarah Hilliard Copyright control. All rights reserved Some Bizzare.

Following the release of Beyond the Pale – Some Bizzare released "The Judgement at Midnight" (originally from their collaboration with Gary Lucas) on the Some Bizzare double album The Only Failure is to Cease to Try.

This was followed by an appearance on The Soft Cell remix album (Soft Cell Heat: The Remixes (Universal/Mercury/Some Bizzare) – The Dark Poets remix of Soft Cell track "Barriers".

The Dark Poets began then working with Italian/London DJ and vocalist DJ Mike Anderson. Their first release together features on Jambalay records as a download from the Deep Conversations E.P. "Dont Step" – featuring 2 club and dub mixes by The Dark Poets. "The Dark Poets Remix" and "The Dark Poets Mind Your Language" mix.

The Cradle of Fear EP was released for download only in 2011 from www.darkpoets.com. Featuring a re-release of their 'oldskool' breakbeat Cradle of Fear tracks "Breakbeat Hallowe'en" & "It doesn't matter" the EP also features British electronica artist Kontour on vocals – a rendition of Breakbeat Halloween. Plus Dark Poets techno work out "Headf*ck".

The Dark Poets – Prime Time EP. Jambalay Records – Featuring mixes by The Big Robot, Form Constant and Stitch.

== Discography ==
- 2001 – Cradle of Fear (Film Soundtrack) – Breakbeat Halloween & It Doesn't Matter (Silvascreen records)
- 2006 – Redefining the Prologue (Some Bizzare Compilation) – Crazy

2007 - Dead Steps (Premeditated Media)

- 2008 – Some Bizzare Double Album (Some Bizzare Compilation) – The Judgement at Midnight
- 2008 – Beyond the Pale Gary Lucas vs The Dark Poets – Album – Some Bizzare
- 2008 – Soft Cell – "Heat – The Remixes" (The Dark Poets remix of the Almond/Ball track 'Barriers') Some Bizzare/Universal
- 2009 – Some Bizzare Double Album Some Bizzare Double Album "The Only Failure is to cease to try" – "Gary Lucas Vs The Dark Poets "The Judgement at Midnight (From Dusk to Dawn Mix)" Some Bizzare
- 2009 – The Problem Being – "Electro is Dead" (The Dark Poets remix) Some Bizzare /Departure records (Sometimes referred to as 'The Dead Poets remix)
- 2011 – Deep Conversations "Dont Step EP" 2 Remixes by The Dark Poets 'Dark Poets remix' and 'The Dark Poets Mind your language remix' – Jambalay records
- 2011 – The Dark Poets – Cradle of Fear EP – Download EP. Featuring the tracks "Breakbeat Hallow'een" & "It doesn't matter" and "Breakbeat Hallowe'en Featuring Kontour" and "headf*ck".?
- 2013 – The Dark Poets – Prime Time EP. Jambalay Records
- 2013 – The Fellowship – Mike Anderson and Santonio Echols – The Dark Poet Mix – Chapter 2 recordings
- 2013 – Calling Colin Dale – Mike & Rob – The Dark Poets 'The Dark Poets 'Onto the battlefield remix' and The Dark Poets 'The Path in the forest remix' Jambalay records
- 2013 – 'Punish Me With Your Love' – Mike & Rob 'The Dark Poets Remix' Jambalay records

== Film soundtracks ==
- 2001 Cradle of Fear – director Alex Chandon – soundtrack released on Silvascreen Records
- 2006 Borderline – director Alex Chandon
- 2010 Teleportal – director Paul Shrimpton
