= Scanners (album) =

Studio album by Kontour
- Released: February 2008
- Genre: Electronic; Industrial
- Label: Some Bizzare Records
- Producer: David Hunt

Kontour chronology
Protect & Survive (2007)	Scanners (2008)

Scanners is the second album by Kontour, released on Some Bizzare Records.

== Background ==
Recorded in West Sussex, 2007. The Executive Producer was Stevo Pearce head of Some Bizzare Records. The album was recorded using no MIDI instruments or personal computers, instead primitive music sequencers, tape effects and Drum Machines were used. The vocals on the album where treated like a sound source and manipulated with audio effects. The album follows a theme based on paranoia; the idea of always being watched wherever you go.

== Track listing ==
1. "The Kennedy Syndrome"
2. "Loose Wire"
3. "Fireworks"
4. "Scanners"
5. "Inhalation"
6. "Necromance"
7. "Taken"
8. "Pressure Point"
9. "Unseen"
10. "SHC"
11. "Second Skin"
12. "Lazarus"
13. "Setting Sun"
14. "Snow Blind"
15. "Lest We Forget"

== Personnel ==
- David Hunt - Instruments & production
- Executive Producer - Stevo Pearce
- Mastering - Simon Davey at The Exchange, London
