= Solstice (doom metal band) =

British epic doom metal band

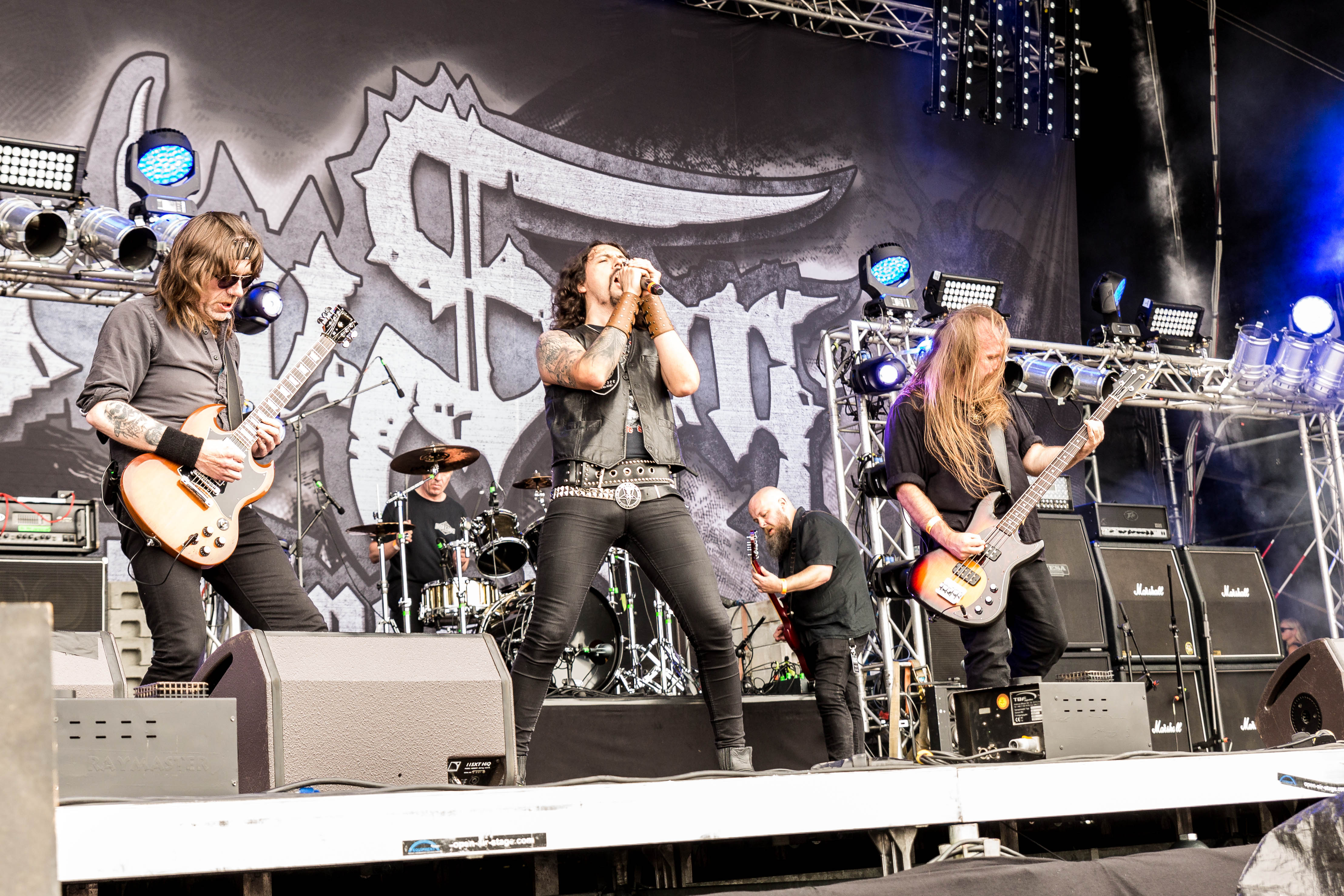
- Solstice at Party.San Metal Open Air 2019

Background information
- Origin: Dewsbury, England
- Genres: Epic doom metal
- Years active: 1990–present
- Members: Hagthorn; Richard M. Walker; James Ashbey; Andy Whittaker; Ian "Geezer" Buxton
- Past members: Paul Bwitton; Rick Budby; Brendan Dawson; Morris Ingram; Simon Matravers; Chaz Netherwood; Tom Phillips; Gian Pyres; Gary Riley; Lennaert Roomer; Mark Stojsavljevic; Hamish Glencross; Shaun Taylor-Steels; Lenny Robinson; Paul Thomas Kearns

Solstice is an English epic doom metal band from Dewsbury, founded by Rich Walker after the breakup of his previous hardcore punk / grindcore bands Sore Throat and Warfear.

Rich Walker previously ran The Miskatonic Foundation, a record label dedicated to doom metal and traditional heavy metal.

== History ==
Contemporary with the second wave of black metal that was especially active in Norway and other Scandinavian nations, Solstice released their debut album Lamentations on England's Candlelight Records in 1994. The album was followed by a UK tour with Count Raven and a European tour with Anathema.

1996 saw the release of the Halcyon EP on Godhead Recordings; two years later, the band signed with Misanthropy Records, which helped release New Dark Age. During these times, Solstice were experiencing issues with their line-up, which culminated in them splitting up in 2002.

Solstice was reunited in 2007 after a five-year hiatus. Walker commented that he was inspired to continue Solstice after enlisting Andrew Whittaker from The Lamp of Thoth. The recruitment of Paul Britton on vocals and Richard Horton on drums (both formerly of NWOBHM outfit Scarab) was brief, but the band had Procession singer Felipe temporarily fill the vocalist position to honour live commitments.

Buoyed by their live success, Solstice recruited Paul Thomas Kearns a full-time vocalist in summer 2011. An Irishman living in Oslo, Kearns appeared on one album with disbanded Irish doom/death metal band Arcane Sun. The new line-up of Solstice made their live debut on 24 September 2011, opening for Primordial's 20-year anniversary show at Dublin's Academy Del Nichol replaced Richard Horton on drums later in 2011, and was also replaced nine months later by Deceptor's drummer James Ashbey.

Solstice ended their 12-year absence from the recording studio in early 2013 with the release of their Mini LP Death's Crown is Victory, issued on their own "White Horse" imprint. They promoted this release by touring across Europe.

In late 2019, Hel Thorne, alternately regarded as Hagthorn, was revealed as the new vocalist of Solstice, having replaced Paul Thomas Kearns. To commemorate her joining the band, Solstice released a two-song EP called White Thane, which consisted of two songs from their 2018 album White Horse Hill reworked with Hagthorn on vocals. Hagthorn's previous musical experience includes being the vocalist for Vermont-based doom metal band Chalice.

== Discography ==
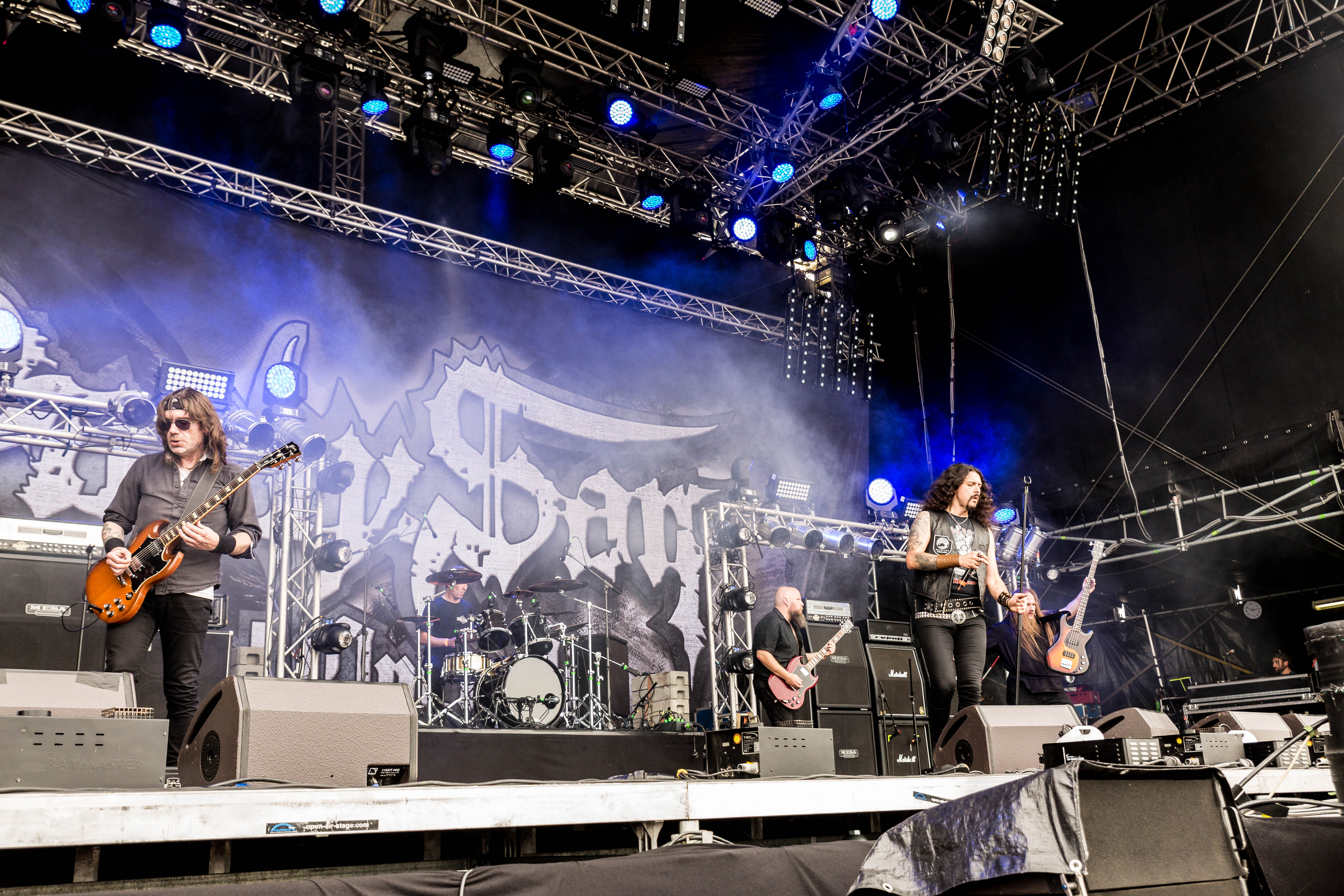
Solstice at Party.San Metal Open Air 2019

=== Albums ===
- Lamentations, 1994
- New Dark Age, 1998
- White Horse Hill, 2018

=== Mini albums ===
- Death's Crown Is Victory, 2013
- White Horse Hill, 2015

=== EPs ===
- Halcyon, 1996

=== Splits ===
- Solstice/Twisted Tower Dire, 2001
- Solstice/The Lord Weird Slough Feg, 2002

=== Demos ===
- Lamentations, 1991
- MCMXCII, 1992
- As Empires Fall, 1993
- Ragnarok, 1994
- Drunken Dungeon Sessions, 1997
- To Sol A Thane, 2016

=== Compilations ===
- Only the Strong, 2008
- Epicus Metalicus Maximus, 2010

== Band members ==
Current members

- Richard M. Walker – guitar (1990–2002, 2007–present)
- Rick Budby – drums (1996–2002, 2016–present)
- Andy Whittaker – guitar (2010–present)
- Daryl Parson – bass (2018–present)
- Hagthorn – vocals (2019–present)

Former members

- Dave "Doom" Talbot – vocals, guitar (1990–1991)
- Paul Youdan – vocals (1991–1992)
- Mark Stojsavljevic – vocals (1992–1993)
- Simon Matravers – vocals (1994–1995)
- Morris Ingram – vocals (1996–2002)
- Tom Phillips – vocals (1996)
- Adrian Miles – vocals (2007–2010)
- Paul Britton – vocals (2010–2011)
- Paul Thomas Kearns – vocals (2011–2019)
- Lennaert Roomer – guitar (1991–1992), drums (1994–1995)
- Lee Baines – guitar (1992–1993)
- Hamish Glencross – guitar (1996–1999)
- Jerry Budby – guitar (2000)
- Roberto Mendes – guitar (2001–2002)
- Brendan Dawson – bass (1990–1993)
- Gian Pyres – bass (1993), guitar (1994–1996)
- Lee Netherwood – bass (1994–2002)
- Diccon Harper – bass (2007–2010)
- Lenny Robinson – bass (2010–2012)
- Ian "Geezer" Buxton – bass (2012–2018)
- Gary Riley – drums (1990–1993)
- Shaun Taylor-Steels – drums (1995–1996, 2007–2010)
- Richard Horton – drums (2010–2011)
- Del Nichol – drums (2011–2012)
- James Ashbey – drums (2012–2016)

Timeline
