= Evermore Darkly =

Evermore Darkly...

EP by Cradle of Filth
- Released: 18 October 2011
- Studios: Monkey Puzzle House Studio, Woolpit and Springvale Studios, Suffolk, England
- Genre: Extreme metal
- Length: 43:24
- Labels: Peaceville (Europe); Nuclear Blast (US)
- Producers: Scott Atkins and Cradle of Filth

Cradle of Filth chronology
Darkly, Darkly, Venus Aversa (2010)	Evermore Darkly... (2011)	Midnight in the Labyrinth (2012)

Professional ratings
Review scores
Source	Rating
About.com	3.5/5 stars
Metal Storm	unfavourable

Evermore Darkly... is the fourth EP by English extreme metal band Cradle of Filth, released in October 2011. A companion piece to the 2010 album Darkly, Darkly, Venus Aversa, it contains two new tracks in "Transmission from Hell" and "Thank Your Lucky Scars", plus demo versions of some Venus Aversa tracks. An orchestral version of "Summer Dying Fast" (a track from 1994's The Principle of Evil Made Flesh album, reworked previously for 2001's Bitter Suites to Succubi) is also included as a taster for the subsequent Midnight in the Labyrinth collection. The CD was originally packaged with a DVD containing a documentary, a live show from 25 June 2011's Graspop festival ("Burning Down Graspop"), and the promo video for "Lilith Immaculate".

== Track listing ==
All lyrics are written by Dani Filth; all music is composed by Cradle of Filth.

Evermore Darkly
No.	Title	Length
1.	"Transmission from Hell"	2:05
2.	"Thank Your Lucky Scars"	4:53
3.	"Forgive Me Father (I Have Sinned)" (Elder version)	4:22
4.	"Lilith Immaculate" (extended length)	8:03
5.	"The Persecution Song" (Elder version)	5:36
6.	"Forgive Me Father (I'm in a Trance)"	6:29
7.	"The Spawn of Love and War" (Elder version)	6:21
8.	"Summer Dying Fast" ("Midnight in the Labyrinth" breadcrumb trail)	5:22

Venus Diversa DVD
No.	Title	Length
1.	"Humana Inspired to Nightmare" (live)	1:27
2.	"Heaven Torn Asunder" (live)	7:44
3.	"Honey and Sulphur" (live)	6:28
4.	"Lilith Immaculate" (live)	6:39
5.	"Her Ghost in the Fog" (live)	7:08
6.	"Nymphetamine (Fix)" (live)	5:49
7.	"The Principle of Evil Made Flesh" (live)	5:27
8.	"Ebony Dressed for Sunset" (live)	3:44
9.	"The Forest Whispers My Name" (live)	5:03
10.	"Cruelty Brought Thee Orchids" (live)	8:06
11.	"From the Cradle to Enslave" (live)	6:39
12.	"Lilith Immaculate" (music video)	6:14
13.	"You Can't Polish a Turd... But You Can Roll it in Glitter" (Rockumentary)	42:36

== Personnel ==
=== Cradle of Filth ===
- Dani Filth – lead vocals
- Paul Allender – guitars
- James McIlroy – guitars
- Dave Pybus – bass
- Martin "Marthus" Škaroupka – drums, further orchestration on "Lilith Immaculate" (extended length)
- Caroline Campbell – keyboards (live)

=== Additional personnel ===
- Mark Newby-Robson – orchestration on "Thank Your Lucky Scars"
- Doug Bradley – narration on "Transmission from Hell"
- Ralph Woodward – choir conductor & arranger
- Dora Kemp, Chitra Ramalingam, Philippa Mann, Anna Asbach-Cullen, Emma Levy, Nikki Cutts, Steve Mullock, Chris Young, Andrew Kennedy, Tim Cutts, Nick Webb, John Aldridge – choir on "Summer Dying Fast"

=== Production ===
- Scott Atkins – producer, engineer, mixing
- Mark Harwood – engineer
- Doug Cook – mixing of Elder version songs and of "Summer Dying Fast"
- Rob Caggiano, Paul Logus – mixing of "Forgive Me Father (I'm in a Trance)"
- Kit Woolven – mixing of "Summer Dying Fast"
- Ross Bolidai – Rocumentary producer and director, "Lilith Immaculate" video director
- Heather Snell – "Lilith Immaculate" producer
- Natalie Shau – cover art

== Charts ==
Year	Chart	Position
2011	Top Hard Rock Albums (USA)	23
2011	French Albums Chart	177
