= Lamentations (Solstice album) =

Studio album by Solstice
- Released: August 1994
- Genre: Doom metal
- Length: 57:12
- Label: Candlelight

Solstice chronology
Lamentations (1994)	New Dark Age (1998)

Lamentations is the debut album of British doom metal band Solstice. Originally released in 1994 through Candlelight Records, the album was re-released in 2006 as a double-LP edition of 400 red vinyl copies and 100 copies of black vinyl with a beer bag.

== Track listing ==
- All songs written and arranged by Solstice. Copyright Full Circle Music.
1. "Lamentations IV" – 1:26
2. "Neither Time nor Tide" – 5:20
3. "Only the Strong" – 8:17
4. "Absolution Extremis" – 6:03
5. "These Forever Bleak Paths" – 6:40
6. "Empty Lies the Oaken Throne" – 4:22
7. "Last Wish" – 5:17
8. "Wintermoon Rapture" – 7:02
9. "The Man Who Lost the Sun" – 9:08
10. "Ragnorok" – 3:33

== Personnel ==
- Simon Matravers – vocals
- Rich Walker – guitar
- Gian Pyres – guitar
- Lee "Chaz" Netherwood – bass
- Lennaert Roomer – drums
