= White Label Music =

- Founder: Marc Hunter; Ann Shenton
- Genre: Various
- Country of origin: UK
- Official website: Official website of White Label Music

White Label Music is an independent record label based in the UK. The label is run by Marc Hunter and Ann Shenton, who was formerly a member of the band Add N to (X).

== Background ==
Artists include The Asbo Kid (James Atkin of the band EMF), Hiem, Kontour and Large Number (ex Add N to (X)). The label is known for its "Electronic Bible" series of compilation albums including artists such as Jarvis Cocker and Delia Derbyshire of the BBC Radiophonic Workshop.

White Label Music specialises in experimental electronic music and has many artists with varied styles. The label also works alongside the Soyuz major record label based in Russia.

The label also organises the three-day "White Noise Electronic Music Festival" in Cornwall.

== Associated artists ==
- Large Number
- Magnum Quilter
- Pony Harvest
- Vars of Litchi
- Hiem
- The Asbo Kid
- Kontour
- Toffeetronic
- Autorotation
- DJ White Noise
- Tidy Kid
- Downstate
- Wire Mother
- Space Junk Rockers
- Beat Frequency
- Pygmy Globetrotters
- Myheadisaballoon
- The Penny Licks
- Jimmy Spaceman
