= St Bede's Catholic Voluntary Academy =

Location
- Collum Avenue; Scunthorpe, Lincolnshire, DN16 2TF; England; 53.56896°N 0.64538°W

Information
- Type: Academy
- Religious affiliation: Roman Catholic
- Department for Education URN: 138018 Tables
- Ofsted: Reports
- Headteacher: Ryan Hibbard
- Gender: Mixed
- Age: 11 to 16
- Enrolment: 693 as of January 2015
- Website: http://www.stbedesscunthorpe.org.uk/

St Bede's Catholic Voluntary Academy (formerly St Bede's Catholic School) is a mixed Roman Catholic secondary school located in Scunthorpe, North Lincolnshire, England.

== History ==
=== Construction ===
Work on the £100,000 school was meant to start September 1956. The foundation stone laid by the Bishop of Nottingham, Edward Ellis, in June 1960. £70,000 was paid for the school, by parishioners, with the rest by Lindsey Education Committee - for the canteen, dining room, medical inspection room, and playing fields.

It received a grant of £400,000 from Department of Education, for new buildings in December 1991. Building began on 18 January 1993.

=== Opening ===
It would open in September 1961 for 360 children. Children came from Brigg and St Norbert in Crowle.

=== Academy ===
Previously a voluntary aided school administered by North Lincolnshire Council, St Bede's Catholic School was converted to academy status on 1 April 2012 and was renamed St Bede's Catholic Voluntary Academy. The school forms part of the Northern Lincolnshire Catholic Academy Trust which is supported by the Roman Catholic Diocese of Nottingham.

=== Headteachers ===
- 1961 Mr Bob Doherty, he died in early August 1998, aged 79, originating from Northern Ireland
- 1980s Michael Nolan

== Curriculum ==
St Bede's Catholic Voluntary Academy offers GCSEs and BTECs as programmes of study for pupils.

When league tables were introduced in 1992, the school, and the two Isle of Axholme comprehensives, were the top in the local area. It received an excellent Ofsted report in 1998.

== Notable former pupils ==
- Stephen Fretwell
- Michelle Lalor, former editor of the Scunthorpe Evening Telegraph, attended the John Leggott College
- Carmel McCourt singer
- Dame Rachel de Souza
- Natalka Znak, read PPE at Somerville College, Oxford from 1984 and gained a 1st, a cross-country runner at school, attended the John Leggott College, television producer, who created I'm a Celebrity...Get Me Out of Here!, becoming executive producer of Love Island (of Ukrainian descent)
