= Death's Crown Is Victory =

Studio album by Solstice
- Released: 18 October 2013
- Genre: Doom metal
- Length: 26:04

Solstice chronology
New Dark Age (1998)	Death's Crown Is Victory (2013)

Death's Crown Is Victory is a 2013 EP by British doom metal band Solstice. It was originally released through the bands page on the website Bandcamp.

== Track listing ==
1. "Fortress England" – 03:21
2. "I Am the Hunter" – 09:00
3. "Death's Crown Is Victory" – 09:47
4. "Aequinoctium II" – 03:55

== Personnel ==
- Paul Kearns – vocals
- Rich Walker – guitar
- Andy Whittaker – guitar
- Ian "Izak Gloom" Buxton – bass guitar
- James Ashbey – drums
