= Peace Through Superior Firepower =

Video by Cradle of Filth
- Released: 22 November 2005
- Recorded: Elysée Montmartre, Paris, 2 April 2005
- Genre: Extreme metal
- Length: 135 mins
- Label: Roadrunner
- Director: Steve Graham
- Producer: Steve Graham

Cradle of Filth chronology
| Mannequin (2003) | Peace Through Superior Firepower (2005) |

Professional ratings
Review scores
| Source | Rating |
|---|---|
| PopMatters | 7/10 stars |

Peace Through Superior Firepower is a music DVD by the English extreme metal band Cradle of Filth, released on 1 November 2005 through Roadrunner Records.

The DVD contains a full concert filmed on 2 April 2005 at Elysée Montmartre, Paris. It also contains six music videos and extra features including footage of a signing session and a "Shockumentary".

== DVD features ==
Target... Paris (Live)
| No. | Title | Length |
|---|---|---|
| 1. | "Satyriasis" | 2:05 |
| 2. | "Gilded Cunt" | 3:51 |
| 3. | "Nemesis" | 8:06 |
| 4. | "Mannequin" | 4:14 |
| 5. | "The Black Goddess Rises" | 6:37 |
| 6. | "A Gothic Romance" | 7:51 |
| 7. | "Her Ghost in the Fog" | 5:46 |
| 8. | "Nymphetamine (Fix)" | 5:04 |
| 9. | "Tortured Soul Asylum" | 7:49 |
| 10. | "The Forest Whispers My Name" | 5:24 |
| 11. | "A Bruise Upon the Silent Moon" | 1:58 |
| 12. | "The Promise of Fever" | 6:14 |
| 13. | "Thirteen Autumns and a Widow" | 7:18 |
| 14. | "Mother of Abominations" | 9:23 |
| 15. | "Painting Flowers White Never Suited My Palette" | 1:30 |
| 16. | "From the Cradle to Enslave" | 5:48 |

Reinforcements
| No. | Title | Length |
|---|---|---|
| 1. | "Postcards from Vulgaria" (A Shockumentary) |
| 2. | "Virgin on the Stupid" (Cradle of Filth signing session) |

Extra Rounds: Video Propaganda
| No. | Title | Length |
|---|---|---|
| 1. | "Her Ghost in the Fog" (music video) | 4:37 |
| 2. | "No Time to Cry" (music video) | 4:18 |
| 3. | "Babalon A.D. (So Glad for the Madness)" (music video) | 5:54 |
| 4. | "Mannequin" (music video) | 4:15 |
| 5. | "The Promise of Fever" (music video) | 6:08 |
| 6. | "Nymphetamine (Fix)" (music video) | 5:03 |
