= From the Cradle to Enslave =

1999 EP by Cradle of Filth

EP by Cradle of Filth
- Released: 30 October 1999
- Recorded: 1999
- Studios: Parr Street (Liverpool) and Springvale (Ipswich)
- Genre: Extreme metal
- Length: 32:01
- Labels: Music for Nations (Europe); Metal Blade (US); The End (re-release)
- Producer: Cradle of Filth

Cradle of Filth chronology
Cruelty and the Beast (1998)	From the Cradle to Enslave (1999)	Midian (2000)

From the Cradle to Enslave is the second EP by English extreme metal band Cradle of Filth, released on 30 October 1999 by Music for Nations (Europe) and Metal Blade (US).

== Recording and content ==
The EP was recorded during a period of upheaval for the band, with Gian Pyres and Nick Barker leaving prior to its release (Pyres would return for the recording of Midian) and Stuart Anstis and Les Smith departing the band soon afterwards.

From the Cradle to Enslave contains two original compositions: the title track and "Of Dark Blood and Fucking". The rest of the disc consists of a re-recording of a track from the album Dusk... and Her Embrace and two or three cover versions, depending on the region (the US release includes "Dawn of Eternity" instead of the European version's title track remix "Pervert's Church").

== Release ==
From the Cradle to Enslave was released on 30 October 1999 by record labels Music for Nations (Europe) and Metal Blade (US). It reached number 84 in the UK Albums Chart.

== Reception ==
Professional ratings
Review scores
Source	Rating
AllMusic	2.5/5 stars
Chronicles of Chaos	8/10
Metal Hammer	8/10

AllMusic described the EP as "a worthy addition to any fan's collection, featuring several songs that rank with the best of their work".

Dani Filth revealed his antipathy towards the title track in Kerrang!: "We have to play it at every gig... I'd like to erase it, so I wouldn't have to play it again. After a while you just want to play something different. There's something about the hook that just strikes a chord of fear down my spine."

== Track listing ==
No.	Title	Lyrics	Music	Length
1.	"From the Cradle to Enslave"	Dani Filth	Cradle of Filth	6:37
2.	"Of Dark Blood and Fucking"	Dani Filth	Cradle of Filth	6:02
3.	"Death Comes Ripping" (Misfits cover)	Glenn Danzig	Danzig	1:57
4.	"Sleepless" (Anathema cover)	Darren White	Daniel Cavanagh and Anathema	4:19
5.	"Pervert's Church (From the Cradle to Deprave)" (remix of "From the Cradle to Enslave" only on European release)			4:58
6.	"Funeral in Carpathia (Be Quick or Be Dead Version)"	Dani Filth	Cradle of Filth	8:08

No.	Title	Lyrics	Music	Length
5.	"Dawn of Eternity" (Massacre cover; only on American release)	Kam Lee	Rick Rozz	6:24

== PanDaemonAeon ==
PanDaemonAeon

Video by Cradle of Filth
- Released: 5 October 1999
- Genre: Extreme metal
- Label: Music for Nations
- Director: Alex Chandon

Cradle of Filth chronology
PanDaemonAeon (1999)	Heavy, Left-Handed and Candid (2002)

"From the Cradle to Enslave" was the first Cradle of Filth song to have a music video. It was directed by Alex Chandon, who would produce further promo clips and DVD documentaries for the band, as well as the full-length feature film Cradle of Fear. The video features explicit images of nudity and gore and was released in two versions, one edited (supposedly to make it MTV-friendly) and one uncut. Both contain a reference to the Cruelty and the Beast cover art, when a woman is seen emerging from a bathtub filling with blood. Both versions can be found on PanDaemonAeon, which was released on VHS on 5 October 1999, and on DVD in 2002. The DVD also includes a "Making-of" documentary and a short live show, recorded at the London Astoria on 5 June 1998.

=== Astoria show track list ===
1. "Dusk and Her Embrace"
2. "Beneath the Howling Stars"
3. "Cruelty Brought Thee Orchids"
4. "Malice Through the Looking Glass"

== Personnel ==
Cradle of Filth

- Dani Filth – lead vocals
- Stuart Anstis – guitars
- Gian Pyres – guitars
- Robin Graves – bass
- Lecter – keyboards
- Was Sarginson – drums on "From the Cradle to Enslave", "Death Comes Ripping" and "Sleepless"
- Adrian Erlandsson – drums on "Of Dark Blood and Fucking" and "Dawn of Eternity"
- Nick Barker – drums on "Funeral in Carpathia (Be Quick or Be Dead Version)"
- Sarah Jezebel Deva – backing vocals

Production

- Mike Exeter, Dan Spriggs – engineering on tracks 1–4, mixing on tracks 3–4
- John Fryer – mixing on tracks 1 and 2
- Mark Harwodd – engineering and mixing on "Funeral in Carpathia" and "Dawn of Eternity"
- Damien Clarke and Lecter – remixing of "Perverts Church"
- Noel Sommerville – mastering

== Charts ==
Year	Chart	Position
1999	UK Albums Chart	84
