= Axel Thesleff =

Finnish electronic musician and producer

- Born: Helsinki, Finland
- Genres: electronic, dance
- Occupations: Producer; Songwriter
- Years active: 2010–present
- Website: www.axelthesleff.com

Axel Thesleff is a Finnish electronic musician and producer based in Helsinki, Finland.

== Early life and education ==
Axel Thesleff grew up in Roihuvuori, Helsinki, where he started playing the piano at the age of 9.

As a teenager he began focusing on production, releasing his first album Waste Land in 2010 inspired by the T.S. Eliot poem The Waste Land", for which he was recognized by SoundCloud as their Soundclouder of the Day in May 2011.

He continued producing music in his spare time while studying musicology at the University of Helsinki.

== Career ==
As an adult, Thesleff spent time in Helsinki clubs, which influenced how he used bass in his music.

=== Bad Karma (2014) ===
Thesleff released his single "Bad Karma" in 2014, which he uploaded to SoundCloud to celebrate surpassing 300 followers on Facebook. The song was featured by the YouTube channel Trap Nation which helped it spread significantly, and has since amassed over 500 million streams. The song has been heard on BBC Radio and as part of Adidas' 2020 'Faster Than' campaign.

=== Two Worlds EP (2018) ===
In November, 2018, Thesleff released his Two Worlds EP alongside a 30-minute film. The project, which consists of five tracks and videos, explores the perspective of three individuals living in between two worlds, as well as "aspects of duality, determinism, existentialism and the human condition" according to Thesleff. Thesleff released a remix EP of Two Worlds in March 2019, featuring artists including CloZee, Alex Banks and SickFlip.

=== Arena Live (2020) ===
In August 2020, Thesleff shared a video of an hour long live set titled Arena Live which he had developed for his SXSW showcase, which was cancelled due to the COVID-19 pandemic. Filmed at the Helsinki Ice Hall with a 12-person crew, Thesleff worked with visual artist Petri Ruikka to develop the project over the course of 6 months.

=== 2 Down (2020) ===
The cinematic music video released in December 2020, was nominated for multiple awards internationally and won the Best Music video award at both the Rome Prisma Film Awards and Montreal Independent Film Festival. The video is also a finalist at The Newport Beach Film Festival which takes place October 28, 2021.

The video portrays a nomadic woman's journey backpacking through Finland's surreal landscape. Surrounded by sprawling greenery and awe-inspiring mountains, a woman embarks on a soulful adventure of solitude and self-reflection. While soaking in the serene beauty around her, she reflects on her turbulent relationship with her daughter. Painful memories from heated arguments that led her daughter to leave their home race through her mind.

=== Performances ===
Over the course of his career Thesleff has performed in Finland, North America (where he supported CloZee and Beats Antique on a 30-date tour), Romania (including a performance at the Electric Castle festival), the Czech Republic (Hot Spot 2021, Colours of Ostrava 2022) Costa Rica (at Envision 2019 festival), and Georgia.

== Musical style ==
Influenced by western classical music and eastern musical traditions, Thesleff has described his style as a blend of a number of genres, including progressive rock, metal, post-rock, indie, IDM, and EDM.
