= Nymphetamine =

Studio album by Cradle of Filth
- Released: 28 September 2004
- Recorded: February–July 2004 at Parkgate Studios, Battle, East Sussex and The Chapel Studios, South Thoresby, Lincolnshire, England
- Genre: Extreme metal
- Length: 75:47
- Label: Roadrunner
- Producers: Rob Caggiano and Cradle of Filth

Cradle of Filth chronology
Damnation and a Day (2003)	Nymphetamine (2004)	Thornography (2006)

Singles from Nymphetamine
- 1. "Nymphetamine" Released: 2004; 2. "Devil Woman" Released: 2005

Alternative cover
- Special Edition cover

Nymphetamine is the sixth studio album by English extreme metal band Cradle of Filth. Recorded between February and July 2004, it was released on 28 September by record label Roadrunner. Nymphetamine marks the first recorded appearance of guitarist James McIlroy on a Cradle of Filth album. He would later record guitar for the band's 2010 release Darkly, Darkly, Venus Aversa. Nymphetamine is also the band's final album to feature keyboardist Martin Powell.

== Content ==
The title is a portmanteau of "nymphette" and "amphetamine", and Dani Filth explained it as referring to "a drug-like addiction to the woman in question, with her insidious vampire qualities literally bringing her lover back from the brink of the spiritual grave, only to bury him further on the strength of a whim. This is very Edgar Allan Poe in style, and leaves one thinking that, despite the character's inner agonies, he is really a welcome submissive who readily enjoys the terrible highs and lows of his relationship with this alluring and filthy succubus."

The album features guest appearances by ex-Theatre of Tragedy and Leaves' Eyes vocalist, Liv Kristine, and Doug Bradley, who starred as the cenobite Pinhead in the Hellraiser series and also collaborated on Midian.

"Mother of Abominations" begins with the chant of the phrase "Ia! Ia! Cthulhu fhtagn!", which is a reference to H. P. Lovecraft's fiction, specifically the body of work encompassing the Cthulhu Mythos.

The title track appears on the album twice; in a three-part, nine-minute version ("Nymphetamine (Overdose)") and again in a shortened five-minute version ("Nymphetamine Fix").

=== Track-by-track commentary ===
Filth provided the following explanations for the album's individual tracks in a July 2004 press release:

Gilded Cunt

A harsh song demands an uncompromising title. The subject matter is simple. The "gilded cunt" refers to a spoilt dominatrix who demands worship through the acquisition of money. She is in actual fact, beneath the glitter of expensive jewellery, no more than tendered mutton dressed up as lamb. There was nothing quite as gratifying as screaming the word "cunt" at the top of one's lungs for the mid-section of this vicious little ditty. I loved it! An extremely angry song in the vein of Sepultura's Roots, mixed with choice World Downfall tracks by Terrorizer.

Nemesis

In the wake of the September 11 attacks, few people could possibly remain unaware of the rising threat to world peace through concerted acts of terrorism. This song delves into the mind of one such militant and offers the reasoning behind his holy war: the needless loss of loved ones and the desire to avenge their memory against a privileged western enemy. This song seeks not to condone or encourage such retaliation, but to find an explanation. It is my personal favourite track on the album. Sounds like At the Gates meets Judas Priest meets Morbid Angel listening to "Amor e Morte".

Gabrielle

Yet another little gothic romance embroiled around a murderer's infatuation with the dusky foreign woman of the title. I love the ending of the track, mainly because up to this point the character has only really poetic things to say about Gabrielle (although you do get the impression that something is definitely a tad sinister about his infatuation), but then everything finally darkens... The song rolls into culmination with a really Slayer-esque finale.

Absinthe with Faust

Two sinners reflect on their lives of decadence and pomp as they share their last drink on the very verge of the abyss. This song was inspired by a night of guilt and nostalgia (in fact I felt a little at sixes and sevens musing over all the events of the last six or seven years) and attributing our success to devilish intervention, as in the infamous Goethe story where Faust sells his soul to the Devil in return for a life of riches and splendour. It features some of my favourite lines, and sounds like Master of Puppets era Metallica.

Nymphetamine

The title track concerns itself with a love affair so intense, that although soured and dead, it ignites at the slightest sniff of re-invention. The cool thing about this song is that it is really a beast of several parts: a chimera. The main hub of the song is very lovelorn and drowsily melodic and it is these traits combined with shared female and male vocal passages that serve to highlight the plight of this, the title track of the album. However, this is offset against the first and last parts of the song, forming a darkly erotic triptych.

Medusa and Hemlock

This track concerns itself with the priest and high priestess of a witch cult, who, through their utter devotion to themselves and the dark arts, conspire to invoke ancient forces from their graveyard slumbers, remaining as carnal gatekeepers in the interim. The lyrics join them in celebration of a triumphant return on Samhain night, when the deadways between the worlds are at their closest and most vulnerable to rupture. Sounds like "The Twisted Nails of Faith" meets early Destruction and Death in a misty cemetery.

Coffin Fodder

This track is about escapism from a world ruled over by preachers, no-hopers and soul destroying vermin and the flights of fancy conjured by believing in one's own destiny (no matter what entails). A very personal lyrical content, this is about rising above the unappreciative mob with a life-affirming "fuck you!" The main harmony is the closest Cradle have got to sounding anything like classic Iron Maiden, but this song also veers towards blast-lightspeed. Though not as brutal and uncompromising as "Mother of Abominations", it is probably the fastest track on the album when and where it roars.

English Fire

This song is very enigmatic. Slow, heavy and grandiose, it reeks of pomp and dark majesty, and rocks in a Sabbath, doom-laden context. Lyric-wise, it concerns itself with heritage and invigorated pride for one's own country: not in a nationalistic, fascistic sense, but in terms of rebuilding the beauty and stature of a once great nation. Obviously the title implies that nation to be England (Cradle's country of origin), but the words can be interpreted to speak of anyone's homeland that is seen to be slumping from the weight of its afflictions. Sounds like Manowar meets Cathedral, interspersed with moments of melodic reflection.

Filthy Little Secret

A very Lovecraftian tale about the guardian of an extraordinarily gifted beauty: a beauty who slips beyond the veil of the underworld at night to dam the rift between our world and the abyss. This she achieves by fucking everything that comes close to breaching the gap, therefore satiating demoniacal urges that want, quite literally, to rend our world apart. The twist comes when her guardian fails to resist his own desire for the beauty who, at all costs, must remain pure and untouched in our world in order that her erotically-charged spirit remain firmly hilted in the other. Any attempt to interfere with her seance will result in horrors from the pit slathering into the real world to wreak far worse atrocities than those they inflict nightly upon her gorgeous astral form. This track was never intended for the album. In all honesty it was a total rank outsider even for the special edition, until it was played to the producer, who thought it was such a catchy metal anthem that it was immediately drawn out of retirement and rehearsed vehemently at the studio to bring it up to date. Sounds like Mercyful Fate meets Motörhead at death metal's throat.

Swansong for a Raven

This is the second part to "Her Ghost in the Fog", and therefore follows the subsequent story of the young man avenging his woman's rape and murder at the hands of a self-styled lynch-inquisition. The original (which culminated in the man, haunted by his lover's spirit, burning those responsible alive in the village chapel) is expanded upon as he recalls the events of that fateful day. He too is then hunted by a vengeful mob in the same forest, where he converses with his lover's beautiful, but dead and rotting, body. This has a very Sleepy Hollow/Nightmare Before Christmas vibe.

Mother of Abominations

A song about the great goddess Cthulhu and the awakening of her dark spirit from centuries of slumber, leading to the inevitable destruction of human existence. In truth, a continuation to Midian's "Cthulhu Dawn". This is a very brutal track, lightning-fast and uncompromising, much like the Great Old One herself, sweeping away all before her in a colossal tidal wave of violence and millennial bloodshed. Sounds like Nightside-era Emperor meets early, fast Cradle, with extra thrash.

== Release ==
Nymphetamine debuted at number 89 on the Billboard Top 200 chart, selling 13,818 copies, and reached number 92 in the UK Albums Chart. By early 2007 Nymphetamine has sold 147,000 copies in the United States alone, making it the most successful Cradle album to date. It has also been certified Gold in Europe by Independent Music Companies Association. Since its release, Nymphetamine has sold more than one million copies worldwide.

A music video for the "Fix" version of "Nymphetamine" was filmed by Dani Jacobs.

A Special Edition of the album was released in 2005, with an extra disc featuring two new songs, an alternate version of the title track, three cover songs, a guest appearance by King Diamond and a CD-ROM of the "Nymphetamine" promo video.

== Critical reception ==
Professional ratings
Review scores
Source	Rating
AllMusic	3.5/5 stars
Chronicles of Chaos	7.5/10
Collector's Guide to Heavy Metal	5/10
Encyclopedia of Popular Music	3/5 stars
Metal Storm	7/10 (2004); 9/10 (2005)

AllMusic's review was favourable, calling the album "extremely entertaining".

The title track was nominated for a 2004 Grammy Award in the Best Metal Performance category.

== Legacy ==
"Mother of Abominations" appeared on the soundtrack to the 2005 horror film Alone in the Dark. "Coffin Fodder" is mentioned in episode four of the UK comedy television series The IT Crowd, as track four on a gift-wrapped CD given by the goth character Richmond to a grieving widow at a funeral. "Nemesis" is featured in episode six of season five of the US comedy television series Viva La Bam (in which Dani Filth and the band make a guest appearance). "Nymphetamine" (in its short, "Fix" version) appeared on the soundtrack to Resident Evil: Apocalypse.

== Track listing ==
All lyrics are written by Dani Filth; all music is composed by Paul Allender and Martin Powell

No.	Title	Length
1.	"Satyriasis (instrumental)"	1:42
2.	"Gilded Cunt"	4:08
3.	"Nemesis"	7:18
4.	"Gabrielle"	5:27
5.	"Absinthe with Faust"	5:14
6.	"Nymphetamine Overdose" (feat. Liv Kristine)	9:14
7.	"Painting Flowers White Never Suited My Palette" (instrumental)	1:57
8.	"Medusa and Hemlock"	4:44
9.	"Coffin Fodder"	5:17
10.	"English Fire"	4:45
11.	"Filthy Little Secret"	6:16
12.	"Swansong for a Raven" (feat. Doug Bradley)	7:09
13.	"Mother of Abominations"	7:33
14.	"Nymphetamine Fix" (feat. Liv Kristine)	5:02

Special Edition bonus disc
No.	Title	Length
1.	"Devil Woman" (Cliff Richard cover, feat. King Diamond)	3:38
2.	"Soft White Throat"	5:40
3.	"Bestial Lust (Bitch)" (Bathory cover)	2:54
4.	"Prey"	4:57
5.	"Nymphetamine (Jezebel Deva Fix)"	5:03
6.	"Mr. Crowley" (Ozzy Osbourne cover)	5:41
7.	"Nymphetamine" (video)	5:06

== Personnel ==
Cradle of Filth

- Dani Filth – lead vocals
- Paul Allender – guitars
- James McIlroy (as "Germs Warfare") – guitars
- Martin Powell (as "Martin Foul") – keyboards, additional guitars, choral arrangements
- Dave Pybus (as "Herr Pubis") – bass
- Adrian Erlandsson – drums

Additional personnel

- Sarah Jezebel Deva – backing vocals
- Liv Kristine Espenæs Krull – vocals on "Nymphetamine" tracks
- King Diamond – backing vocals on "Devil Woman"
- Doug Bradley – narration on "Satyriasis" and "Swansong for a Raven"; Cthulhu chant on "Mother of Abominations"
- Kim Porter, Tessa Bonner, Deborah Roberts, Gregory Skidmore, Tim Sager, Nicholas Todd – chorus

Technical

- Rob Caggiano – production
- Dan Turner – engineering
- Steve Carter, Will Bartle – additional engineering and editing
- Colin Richardson – mixing
- Daniel Presley – orchestral arrangements and mixing
- Alexander Krull – recording of Liv Kristine's vocals

== Charts ==
Year	Chart	Position
2004	Swedish Albums Chart	23
2004	German Albums Chart	25
2004	GfK Dutch Chart	29
2004	Finnish Albums Chart	32
2004	French Albums Chart	44
2004	Australian Albums Chart	53
2004	Austrian Albums Chart	56
2004	Canadian Albums Chart	57
2004	Ultratop Belgian Chart (Flanders)	59
2004	Swiss Albums Chart	64
2004	Ultratop Belgian Chart (Wallonia)	84
2004	Billboard 200 (USA)	89
2004	UK Albums Chart	92
2004	Oricon Japanese Albums Chart	189
