= Bitter Suites to Succubi =

EP by Cradle of Filth
- Released: 22 May 2001
- Recorded: February–April 2001
- Studios: New Rising Studios, Peldon, England
- Genre: Extreme metal
- Length: 49:34
- Labels: Abracadaver (Europe); Spitfire (US)
- Producer: Doug Cook

Cradle of Filth chronology
Midian (2000)	Bitter Suites to Succubi (2001)	Lovecraft & Witch Hearts (2002)

Singles from Bitter Suites to Succubi
- 1. "Born in a Burial Gown" Released: 2001; 2. "No Time to Cry" Released: 2001; 3. "Scorched Earth Erotica" Released: 2001

Bitter Suites to Succubi is the third EP by English extreme metal band Cradle of Filth. It was released on 22 May 2001, through the band's own Abracadaver label.

== Content and recording ==
According to frontman Dani Filth, Bitter Suites to Succubi is a "transitional mini album; essentially an EP", bridging the gap between Midian and Damnation and a Day while the band negotiated their label change from Music for Nations to Sony Records. It features six new compositions (two of which are instrumentals), but is bolstered to album-length with three reworkings of songs from The Principle of Evil Made Flesh ("The Principle of Evil Made Flesh", "Summer Dying Fast" and "The Black Goddess Rises") and a cover of The Sisters of Mercy's "No Time to Cry". It was the band's first release on their own Abracadaver label.

"Dinner at Deviant's Palace" features a recording of Paul Allender's son reading The Lord's Prayer played backwards.

This would be the last studio release to feature guitarist Gian Pyres and long-term bassist Robin Eaglestone.

== Release ==
Bitter Suites to Succubi was released on 22 May 2001 on the band's own record label Abracadaver. It reached number 63 in the UK Albums Chart.

The Special Edition features a teaser for the video for "Born in a Burial Gown" as ROM content, along with a trailer for Cradle of Fear and a "Gallery of the Grotesque" (containing the sleeve art). The Special Edition's track listing misspells "Scorched Earth Erotica" as "Scorched Earth Erotics". Early copies of the CD subtitled "The Black Goddess Rises II" with "Ebon Nemesis".

In October 2011 it was awarded a gold certification from the Independent Music Companies Association indicating sales of at least 75,000 copies throughout Europe.

== Reception ==
Professional ratings
Review scores
Source	Rating
AllMusic	2.5/5 stars
Chronicles of Chaos	7.5/10
Collector's Guide to Heavy Metal	8/10
Encyclopedia of Popular Music	3/5 stars
Exclaim!	favourable
Kerrang!	4/5 stars

AllMusic described it as "a somewhat illogically tossed salad of Cradle of Filth tracks" and "uneven at best".

== Track listing ==
All lyrics are written by Dani Filth; all music is composed by Cradle of Filth (Dani Filth, Gian Pyres, Paul Allender, Robin Eaglestone, Martin Powell, Adrian Erlandsson), except "No Time to Cry" written by Andrew Eldritch, Wayne Hussey, Craig Adams and Gary Marx from The Sisters of Mercy.

No.	Title	Length
1.	"Sin Deep My Wicked Angel"	2:23
2.	"All Hope in Eclipse"	6:39
3.	"Born in a Burial Gown"	4:46
4.	"Summer Dying Fast"	5:21
5.	"No Time to Cry" (The Sisters of Mercy cover)	3:22
6.	"The Principle of Evil Made Flesh"	4:49
7.	"Suicide and Other Comforts"	6:57
8.	"Dinner at Deviant's Palace"	2:59
9.	"The Black Goddess Rises II"	7:22
10.	"Scorched Earth Erotica"	4:56

== Personnel ==
Cradle of Filth

- Dani Filth – lead vocals
- Paul Allender – guitars
- Gian Pyres – guitars
- Robin Eaglestone – bass
- Martin Powell – keyboards
- Adrian Erlandsson – drums
- Sarah Jezebel Deva – female vocals

Guest/session musicians

- Kian Rulten-Allender – voice
- Libitina Grimm – cello

Technical

- Doug Cook – producer, engineer, mixing
- Ray Staff – mastering

== Charts ==
Year	Chart	Position
2001	Top Independent Albums (USA)	11
2001	Finnish Albums Chart	17
2001	Heatseekers Albums (USA)	18
2001	Austrian Albums Chart	36
2001	German Albums Chart	45
2001	UK Albums Chart	63
2001	GfK Dutch Chart	73
2001	French Albums Chart	89
