= Carmel (band) =

English jazz/soul band

- Origin: Manchester, England
- Genres: Jazz; soul
- Years active: 1981–present
- Labels: London; East West; Secret
- Members: Carmel McCourt; Jim Paris
- Past members: Gerry Darby

Carmel are an English jazz/soul group active since the early 1980s. The band consisted of Carmel McCourt, Jim Paris and Gerry Darby.

== History ==
Carmel was formed in Manchester when two students, Carmel McCourt and Jim Parris, got together with drummer Gerry Darby (Parris's cousin). Their debut single, "Storm" reached No. 13 in the UK Independent Chart and they were then signed to London Records. Their second album, The Drum Is Everything (produced by Mike Thorne) drew some praise. Parris and Darby conjured the effect of a full ensemble backing to McCourt's vocals, and alternated between soulful ballads, gospel, blues and jazz. The resulting singles, "Bad Day" and "More, More, More", both went top 25 on the UK Singles Chart.

The following album, The Falling (produced by Brian Eno, Hugh Jones and David Motion) had considerable success in France, achieving gold disc status, and also charted in Belgium, Germany and the Netherlands. "Sally", the first single lifted from the album, sold 200,000 copies in France alone, and led to McCourt featuring in a duet, "J'oublierai ton nom" with French rock singer Johnny Hallyday. With the critical and commercial success awarded to both The Falling and the follow-up album Everybody's Got a Little... Soul, record producers were keen to work with Carmel.

1989 saw the release of Set Me Free, with Brian Eno and Pete Wingfield adding their touches to the material. Jimmy Somerville provided guest vocals on the track "One Fine Day", a song dedicated to Harvey Milk, the first openly gay man to be elected to public office in California, only to be assassinated 10 months later. A five star review in Q described the album as "incendiary". and the decade was closed with the 1990 compilation Collected, summing up the band's career to that date.

1992's Good News saw Carmel moving to East West Records with Paris producing. That album was followed by 1995's World's Gone Crazy, with its producers including Carmel McCourt, Jim Parris, Gerry Darby, Julian Mendelsohn and Mike Thorne. A single was released from World's Gone Crazy, the ballad "If You Don't Come Back", an English-language version of "Si tu no vuelves" by the Spanish singer-songwriter and actor, Miguel Bosé. In 1997, Ronnie Scotts provided the venue for their last album for over a decade, Live at Ronnie Scotts, a partial retrospective of their work to date, also containing some previously unreleased material.

Live performance has been central to Carmel's work and they are successful on the European touring circuit, and have frequently attracted large crowds outside of the UK. The French christened McCourt as the new Edith Piaf, and in Italy she won the accolade of best jazz vocalist at the Messina Festival.

During much of the 1990s, the band members were living between Barcelona, Paris and Manchester, and it was hard for them to work together, so they pursued other musical projects. Paris created the band Nzi Dada with Paris-based multimedia artist Xumo Nounjio, and McCourt worked on various projects as a singer, writer and teacher.

The start of the millennium saw them all back in their adopted hometown of Manchester, but Darby decided he no longer wanted to continue. In 2002, Paris and McCourt undertook a tour playing the old material with a nine-piece band. This resulted in a 2004 live DVD entitled More, More, More, comprising a full band performance and an interview with McCourt and Parris.

In December 2011, McCourt and Paris released their first studio album in over 15 years. Still working under the name Carmel, they released the album Strictly Piaf, which consisted of 10 reinterpretations of classic and lesser-known songs by Edith Piaf. An initial single from the album was Sous le ciel de Paris before the album was made available via download. The collection later received a full CD release in August 2012 via Secret Records.

As of October 2012, McCourt was set to return to live work with a new band formation, performing Carmel classics as well as material from the Strictly Piaf album. Dates included those at London's Islington Town Hall, Stockton Georgian Theatre, and Manchester Band on The Wall. Of the shows, she said: "It will be wonderful to work with the new musicians. They are all great in their own right and it will be so sweet to hear the many songs that Gerry Darby, Jim Parris and I wrote together in the years spanning the 1980s and the 1990s."

McCourt took the band on a European tour of Germany and Switzerland towards the end of May 2013 and began to start playing some of the new songs she had been writing.

On 25 September 2015, McCourt released her first new single with her new band, the double A-side "Sad Situation"/"Second Wife Blues", on new independent label Kultura Recordings. Both tracks were recorded at Limefield Studio in Middleton and mixed and mastered by Kevin O'Toole.

On 2 June 2018, McCourt played her first live date in four years, playing St. Agnes' Church, Longsight, Manchester, followed by summer dates across the North of England including some festivals.

A new album, Wild Country, was released on 25 February 2022 on Secret Records and includes the single "Sad Situation".
