= Bad Karma (1991 film) =

- Official DVD Cover
- Directed by: Alex Chandon
- Written by: Alex Chandon
- Produced by: Alex Chandon; Duncan Jarman; J. Karapateas
- Starring: Carmel; Alex Chandon; Dan Barton
- Cinematography: Alex Chandon
- Edited by: Alex Chandon
- Music by: Carmel
- Distributed by: Shape-Shifting Films
- Release date: 1991
- Running time: 36 minutes
- Country: United Kingdom
- Language: English
- Budget: £350

Bad Karma is a cult horror short film directed by Underground movie director Alex Chandon and stars Carmel and Dan Barton.

== Plot ==
When Dave Jackson celebrates with his friends a garden party, he crosses two bloodthirsty Hare Krishna followers on his doorstep. The two torches not long and provide for hefty blood flow, recently Dave called the emergency alert, which fortunately, run and walk in a SM-Studio the cult berserkers with the appropriate tool in the neck.

== Cast ==
- Julius Barnet as Dave Jackson
- Carmel as Hana
- Lotu as Mr. Jackson
- M. Karapateas as Mrs. Jackson
- Adrian Nudel as Partygoer
- Ben Perkins as Partygoer
- Marcus Raven as Partygoer / Shape shifter / S&M Client
- Joe Carrier as Partygoer
- Ben Bethel as Shape Shifter Leader
- Dan Barton as Shape Shifter Leader
- Jon Raven as Shape Shifter
- Oysten Shirley as Shape Shifter
- Ollie Bond as Shape Shifter
- Bill Corbett as Sado-Masochist
- Alex Chandon as Shape Shifter
- Ian Duds as Shape Shifter
- Edward Cunningham as Shape Shifter / Bubba
- Neil Keenan as Shape Shifter / Goffer
- Julian Portinari as Anthony
- Carla Linley as S & M Girl
- Estelle Ross as S & M Girl
- Saul Brignell as J.T. Rosebucket

== Production ==
Per Chandon, the film had a budget of £350, most of which was spent on the special effects.

== Release ==
The film is part of the SOI Film Entertainment DVD, who was released with Chainsaw Scumfuck and Drillbit on one Disc.

== Reception ==
Bleeding Skull reviewed the short, praising the gore effects and kill scenes, calling the monster designs "one part Etsy and three parts Dollar General." HorrorNews.net also reviewed Bad Karma, comparing it to Peter Jackson's Dead Alive and stating that "The FX team uses every technique they can muster with paper mache heads and carefully planted body parts working on a level that still presents as impressive even with low budget trickery."
