= Drillbit (film) =

- Directed by: Alex Chandon
- Written by: Alex Chandon
- Produced by: Alex Chandon
- Starring: Ben Befell; Tom Cox; Saul Brignell
- Narrated by: Jim Van Bebber
- Cinematography: Alex Chandon
- Edited by: Alex Chandon
- Distributed by: SOI Film Entertainment
- Release date: 1992
- Running time: 33 minutes
- Country: United Kingdom
- Language: English
- Budget: £800

Drillbit is a low-budget short horror film directed by Alex Chandon and stars Ben Bethell, Tom Cox and Saul Brignell.

== Plot ==
An employee detects a pharmaceutical company's sinister plan within the executive office, he will be wiped out with his entire family. Only his son Brian survives the horrific attack, although he has a drill bit rammed into his skull and recognizes only one thought: revenge!

== Cast ==
- Ben Bethell
- Saul Brignell
- Bill Corbett William 'Bill' Corbett as Zombie Raver
- Tom Cox
- Just
- Neil Keenan as Biker Gang Member / Aids Mutant
- Miranda Morten
- Lino Raffa as Goon
- Dominic Hailstone
- Matt "Magnum 'The rat'" Russell

== Production ==
The film was narrated by Jim Van Bebber and the Special FX was created from Duncan Jarman and Dominic Hailstone.
