= Darkly, Darkly, Venus Aversa =

Studio album by Cradle of Filth
- Released: 1 November 2010
- Recorded: Monkey Puzzle House Studio, Woolpit, Suffolk, England, June 2010
- Genre: Extreme metal
- Length: 62:37
- Labels: Peaceville (Europe); Nuclear Blast (US)
- Producers: Scott Atkins; Doug Cook; Dani Filth

Cradle of Filth chronology
Godspeed on the Devil's Thunder (2008)	Darkly, Darkly, Venus Aversa (2010)	Evermore Darkly (2011)

Singles from Darkly, Darkly, Venus Aversa
- 1. "Forgive Me Father (I Have Sinned)" Released: 18 October 2010; 2. "Lilith Immaculate" Released: 2011

Darkly, Darkly, Venus Aversa is the ninth studio album by English extreme metal band Cradle of Filth. It was released on 1 November 2010 by record label Peaceville and is a concept album centred on the demon Lilith. It is Cradle of Filth's only album to feature keyboardist Ashley Ellyllon, and is also the band's final album with Dave Pybus as their bass player and James McIlroy as their second guitar player.

== Background ==
Prior to its release the album was erroneously referred to as All Hallows Eve, probably because the announced release date was close to Halloween.

== Concept and musical style ==
Darkly, Darkly, Venus Aversa is a concept album in the same vein as its predecessor Godspeed on the Devil's Thunder, this time centering on the demon Lilith, the first wife of the biblical Adam. Dani Filth revealed to Metal Hammer in September 2010 that it would be a "feminine" companion piece to Godspeed, "which was a very masculine album, obviously due to its protagonist, Gilles de Rais". Unlike previous historically-based concept albums Godspeed on the Devil's Thunder and Cruelty and the Beast, Darkly, Darkly tells an original story. "It's about the resurgence of Lilith into modern society as a deity", Filth said. "There's a bit of Victoriana in there. Essentially, at heart, it's a nice gothic horror story." Reference to Greek mythology and the Knights Templar is also made, in what was referred to by the label as "a dark tapestry of horror, madness and twisted sex". At an early stage of the album's development in August 2009, Filth hinted that the album's sound was "creepily melodic, like Mercyful Fate or a dark Iron Maiden". The Metal Hammer interview also likened it to King Diamond.

The core album is the band's first to not feature any instrumental tracks. The special edition bonus track "Adest Rosa Secreta Eros" is arguably an instrumental, but features extensive narrative excerpts taken from Aleister Crowley's The Book of the Law.

== Release ==
On 20 August 2010, a free mp3 of the track "Lilith Immaculate" was released by the band as reward for signing up for a mailing list following the album's development. On 29 September Cradle of Filth released the first official video of the album for the track "Forgive Me Father (I Have Sinned)".

Darkly, Darkly, Venus Aversa was released on 1 November by record label Peaceville. A Limited Edition version of the album was released, and was packaged in a hard box containing:

- A second disc of bonus tracks and demos (including "Adest Rosa Secreta Eros", an exclusive track not available on any other edition of the album)
- DVD – the promo video for "Forgive Me Father (I Have Sinned)" plus a documentary on the making of the video
- A 64-page hardback book containing band photos, musings and artwork
- An exclusive T-shirt available only in this box
- A limited edition lenticular 3D image of the album cover art
- Five photographic prints
- An official certificate of authenticity from the band

== Reception ==
Professional ratings
Aggregate scores
Source	Rating
Metacritic	60/100
Review scores
Source	Rating
AllMusic	3/5 stars
Alternative Press	3/10
Kerrang!	3/5 stars
Metal Hammer (GER)	5/7 stars
Metal Storm	7.3/10
PopMatters	8/10 stars
Rock Sound	9/10 stars
Record Collector	3/5 stars
Sonic Seducer	favourable
Uncut	3/5 stars

The album received a generally favourable response from critics. Thom Jurek at AllMusic wrote that it "is tightly focused, employing CoF's trademark orchestral and keyboard elements to fine effect, with wildly intense... blastbeats from Marthus Skaroupka, and screaming guitars... courtesy of Paul Allender and James McEllroy. The concentration on writing and arrangement is disciplined, with a strong set of dynamics, a terrific mix, and great production". PopMatters was very favourable, writing "With some of the best compositions of its career, the highest-quality lyrics in its history, and none of the misfires it has suffered in the past, Cradle of Filth has delivered one of the best extreme metal releases in recent memory".

Darkly, Darkly, Venus Aversa sold 5,800 copies in its first week and debuted at position 99 on the Billboard 200 chart.

== Track listing ==
All lyrics are written by Dani Filth; all music is composed by Cradle of Filth and Mark Newby-Robson.

No.	Title	Length
1.	"The Cult of Venus Aversa"	7:07
2.	"One Foul Step from the Abyss"	4:52
3.	"The Nun with the Astral Habit"	4:53
4.	"Retreat of the Sacred Heart"	3:54
5.	"The Persecution Song"	5:33
6.	"Deceiving Eyes"	6:43
7.	"Lilith Immaculate"	6:11
8.	"The Spawn of Love and War"	6:18
9.	"Harlot on a Pedestal"	5:07
10.	"Forgive Me Father (I Have Sinned)"	4:31
11.	"Beyond Eleventh Hour"	7:16
Total length:		62:37

Limited Edition bonus disc
No.	Title	Length
1.	"Beast of Extermination"	5:32
2.	"Truth & Agony"	5:56
3.	"Mistress from the Sucking Pit"	7:00
4.	"Behind the Jagged Mountains"	5:44
5.	"Forgive Me Father (I Have Sinned)" (music video) (iTunes only)	4:33

Limited Fan Edition bonus disc
No.	Title	Length
1.	"Beast of Extermination"	5:32
2.	"Truth & Agony"	5:56
3.	"Adest Rosa Secreta Eros"	7:25
4.	"Mistress from the Sucking Pit"	7:00
5.	"Behind the Jagged Mountains"	5:44
6.	"The Cult of Venus Aversa" (demo version)	6:48
7.	"The Nun with the Astral Habit" (demo version)	4:58
8.	"Deceiving Eyes" (demo version)	6:44

== Personnel ==
Cradle of Filth

- Dani Filth – lead vocals, production
- Paul Allender – guitars
- James McIlroy – guitars
- Dave Pybus – bass
- Ashley Ellyllon – keyboards
- Martin "Marthus" Škaroupka – drums

Additional personnel

- Mark Newby-Robson – orchestration
- Andy James – additional guitars
- Lucy Atkins – vocals
- Dora Kemp – backing vocals and choir
- Ralph Woodward – choir conductor and arranger
- Ruth McCabe, Tim Cutts, Craig Miller, Philippa Mann, Anna Asbach-Cullen – choir

Technical personnel

- Scott Atkins – producer, engineer, mixing
- Doug Cook – producer, engineer
- Rupert Matthews – assistant engineer
- Andy Sneap – assistant engineer, mastering at Backstage Studios
- Natalie Shau – cover art

== Charts ==
Chart (2010)	Peak position
Australian Albums (ARIA)	89
Austrian Albums (Ö3 Austria)	50
Belgian Albums (Ultratop Flanders)	64
Belgian Albums (Ultratop Wallonia)	97
Dutch Albums (Album Top 100)	83
Finnish Albums (Suomen virallinen lista)	18
French Albums (SNEP)	55
German Albums (Offizielle Top 100)	43
Italian Albums (FIMI)	98
Japanese Albums (Oricon)	240
Swiss Albums (Schweizer Hitparade)	61
UK Albums (Official Charts)	95
US Billboard 200	99
US Independent Albums (Billboard)	10
US Top Hard Rock Albums (Billboard)	7
US Top Rock Albums (Billboard)	19
