= Carmel McCourt =

- Birth name: Carmel McCourt
- Born: 24 November 1958 (age 66); Wrawby, Lincolnshire, England
- Genres: Pop, jazz, soul, blues
- Occupation: Singer
- Years active: 1980s–present
- Labels: London, East West, Secret

Carmel McCourt (born 24 November 1958) is an English singer, best known as the lead vocalist for her eponymous band Carmel, with bassist Jim Paris and drummer Gerry Darby.

== Early life ==
Born in Wrawby, Lincolnshire, England, Carmel McCourt attended St Bede's Catholic School on Collum Avenue in Ashby, Scunthorpe, and Brigg Girls' High School.

== Career ==
Carmel McCourt first came into the public eye as vocalist on the 1982 single "Rain Rain Rain" by Soundtracks and Head. She was credited as C. T. McCourt.

In the 1980s and into the 1990s, Carmel achieved success in the UK and Europe with albums and singles charting on both the UK Albums and UK Singles Charts, respectively.

At the start of the new millennium, Darby left the band and in 2002, Paris and McCourt toured with a nine-piece band performing old material. A 2004 live DVD titled More, More, More was released featuring full band performances and an interview with McCourt and Paris.

In December 2011, McCourt and Paris, still working under the name Carmel, released the album Strictly Piaf, which consisted of 10 cover versions of songs by Edith Piaf.

As of October 2012, McCourt was set to return to live work with a new band formation, performing Carmel classics as well as material from the Strictly Piaf album. Dates included those at London's Islington Town Hall, Stockton Georgian Theatre, and Manchester Band on The Wall. Of the shows, she said: "It will be wonderful to work with the new musicians. They are all great in their own right and it will be so sweet to hear the many songs that Gerry Darby, Jim Paris and I wrote together in the years spanning the 1980s and the 1990s."

McCourt took the band on a European tour of Germany and Switzerland towards the end of May 2013 and began to start playing some of the new songs she had been writing.

On 25 September 2015, McCourt released her first new single with her new band, the double A-side "Sad Situation"/"Second Wife Blues", on new independent label Kultura Recordings. Both tracks were recorded at Limefield Studio in Middleton and mixed and mastered by Kevin O'Toole.

On 2 June 2018, McCourt played her first live date in four years, playing St. Agnes' Church, Longsight, Manchester, followed by summer dates across the North of England including some festivals.

== Discography ==
=== Albums ===
with Carmel

- Carmel (1982, Red Flame) – UK #94 (6-track mini-album)
- The Drum Is Everything (1984, London) – UK #19
- The Falling (1986, London) – UK #88
- Everybody's Got a Little...Soul (1987, London)
- Set Me Free (1989, London)
- Good News (1993, East West)
- World's Gone Crazy (1995, East West)
- Live in Paris (1997, East West) December 1990 performance
- Live at Ronnie Scott's (1998, Indigo Delux) December 1997 performance
- More More More (2010, Secret) live in London October 2003
- Strictly Piaf (2011, Secret)
- Brave New Waves: session (2018, Artifact Records) live in Montreal 1988
- Wild Country (2022, Secret)

=== Singles ===
Solo

- "You're on My Mind" (with Rossana Casale) (1991), London Records
- "La Complainte Pour Sainte Catherine" (with Jo Lemaire) (1994), Play That Beat!
