= Alex Chandon =

English film director (born 1968)

- Born: 3 November 1968 (age 57); North London, United Kingdom
- Occupations: Actor, director, producer, screenwriter, digital artist

Alex Chandon (born 3 November 1968 in North London) is a film director, writer and digital artist. Chandon was known initially for straight-to-video micro-budget horror films. His highest-profile release to date is Cradle of Fear, starring Dani Filth and other members of the band Cradle of Filth in cameo appearances. In 2006, he directed the more substantial Borderline (2006) and the £1,000,000 black comedy horror film Inbred, in 2010. Chandon has also produced a number of music videos for Cradle of Filth as well as several documentaries on their DVDs.

== Career ==
=== Directing ===
His early films, Drillbit and Bad Karma, featured many musicians from the UK anarcho punk scene, notably Ben Bethell, Dan MacCintyre, William 'Bill' Corbett from The Apostles and Julian Portinari from Pallor.

His highest-profile release to date is Cradle of Fear, starring Dani Filth in a leading role, and other members of Cradle of Filth in cameo appearances.

Chandon was once known primarily for specialising in straight-to-video micro-budget horror films, but his latest projects, especially Borderline (2006), featuring music by The Dark Poets, show a more mature side to his work. Borderline has now been chosen for the British Film Institute's National Archive.

Chandon directed the £1,000,000 project Inbred, which was shot in July 2010 in the market town of Thirsk. The script for the black comedy horror film was co-written by Paul Shrimpton.

Chandon's short Teleportal, the script for which was adapted from Paul Shrimpton, was made into a short film. The short premiered on 16 September 2009 and was released as segment of the anthology film Zombieworld in February 2015 on DVD.

=== Music videos ===
Chandon's relationship with Cradle of Filth has also produced music videos for the songs "From the Cradle to Enslave", "No Time to Cry" and "Her Ghost in the Fog", as well as documentaries on their DVDs PanDaemonAeon and Heavy, Left-handed and Candid.

== Filmography ==
Year	Film	Credited as						
Year	Film	Director	Producer	Screenwriter	Actor	Film editor	Cinematography	Role
1982	Nightmare	Yes	Yes	Yes	Yes	Yes	Yes	
1988	Chainsaw Scumfuck	Yes	Yes	Yes	Yes	Yes	Yes	
1989	Bad Manor	Yes	Yes	Yes	Yes	Yes	Yes	
1991	Bad Karma	Yes	Yes	Yes	Yes	Yes	Yes	Shape Shifter
1992	Drillbit	Yes	Yes	Yes	No	Yes	Yes	
1997	Night Pastor	Yes	No	Yes	Yes	Yes		
1997	Pervirella	Yes	No	Yes	Yes	Yes	Yes	Savage Dynamite
1998	Lock, Stock and Two Smoking Barrels	No	No	No	No	No	No	Art Department
1998	Cradle of Filth: PanDaemonAeon	Yes	No	No	No	No	No	Co-Director
1998	Siamese Cop	No	No	Yes	No	No	No	
1998	Witchcraft X: Mistress of the Craft	No	No	No	Yes	No	No	Agent Roberts
2000	Peaches	No	No	Yes	No	No	No	Storyboards
2001	Cradle of Fear	Yes	Yes	Yes	No	No	No	
2003	The Sick Room	No	No	Yes	No	No	No	
2005	BV-01	No	No	No	Yes	No	No	Voice-Over
2006	Borderline	Yes	No	Yes	No	No	No	
2007	Gerry Judah	Yes	No	Yes	No	No	No	
2007	Slash Hive	No	No	No	No	No	No	Digital FX
2008	The Bill	No	No	No	No	No	No	Digital FX
2008	Neon Killer	No	No	No	No	No	No	Digital FX
2008	Comedy Lab - Peter Slater	No	No	No	No	No	No	Digital FX
2011	Inbred	Yes	Yes	No	No	No	No	

== Music videos ==
Year	Title
1999	"From the Cradle to Enslave" by Cradle of Filth
2000	"Her Ghost in the Fog" by Cradle of Filth
2001	"No Time to Cry" by Cradle of Filth
2001	"Scorched Earth Erotica" by Cradle of Filth
2007	"Insect" by Mainstream Distortion
2008	"KONFAB" by Runonsentence
2010	"Its So Cold" by The Dark Poets
2010	"Endless Zoom" by The Dark Poets
2010	"Sarah's Tribute to Oscar Wilde" by The Dark Poets
