= Cradle of Fear =

2001 British horror film by Alex Chandon

- Promotional poster
- Directed by: Alex Chandon
- Written by: Alex Chandon
- Produced by: Ciska Faulkner; Eddie Kane; Paul Luke; Nico Rilla; Andy Skivington
- Starring: Dani Filth; Emily Booth; Eileen Daly
- Cinematography: Sebastiani Bontempi
- Edited by: Alex Chandon
- Music by: Cradle of Filth
- Production company: Pragmatic Pictures Ltd.
- Distributed by: Film 2000
- Release date: 18 December 2001 (UK)
- Running time: 120 minutes
- Country: United Kingdom
- Language: English

Cradle of Fear is a 2001 British horror film, directed by Alex Chandon. It was released direct-to-video on 4 July 2001. Taking inspiration from the anthology films produced by Amicus Productions in the 1970s, it features three separate half-hour segments, linked by a fourth story. The main narrative involves imprisoned serial killer Kemper wreaking vengeance on those responsible for his capture. This he does through his son: Dani Filth playing an unnamed character referred to in the credits as "The Man".

Shot on video and on a very low budget, the film received a mixed to positive reception in the horror press. The film is chiefly of interest to Cradle of Filth fans, as it features the entire lineup (principally Dani, but the rest crop up in cameo roles) from the band's Midian era. Chandon's association with Cradle of Filth began with the promo video for From the Cradle to Enslave, and he went on to direct the clips for "Her Ghost in the Fog" and "No Time to Cry", plus some DVD documentaries. Kemper is played by David McEwen, who also appeared in the video for "Her Ghost in the Fog", miming to Doug Bradley's narration.

== Plot ==
The opening scene sees "The Man" being approached and attacked by two muggers in a dark alley of London. As the muggers check their seemingly unconscious victim for cash, The Man regains consciousness and brutally kills them. Around that time, Inspector Peter Neilson is investigating the apparent murder scene of the young Melissa and Nikki. In a flashback, the two girls are shown in a goth club looking to pick up men. Melissa spotted The Man and took him home. After spending the night with him, she began hallucinating about the people around turning to her with monstrous faces and voices. Melissa went to Nikki's house to seek help, then a creature burst out of Melissa's womb and attacked Nikki, killing both.

Sophie and Emma break into a house in a burglary attempt. When Emma finds a box of money under a bed, a bony old man pops up from the bedcovers and attacks her. The girls stab and bludgeon the old man multiple times before he finally dies. Intending to keep the loot to herself and seeing Emma as a liability for revealing their plan to her sister, Sophie kills Emma and runs home. There, the re-animated bodies of Emma and the old man appear and stab Sophie to death.

As the dead bodies are identified, Inspector Neilson links them to an earlier case he had solved in the past. The case involved a man named Kemper, former hypnotist and son of an infamous Satanist. Kemper had been using his skills to manipulate, abduct and kill children for over 25 years until he was apprehended by Neilson, tried and committed to a lunatic asylum. Neilson's boss has Kemper transferred to another facility so that his cell can be investigated.

Nick Holland is an amputee who is unable to engage in sexual activity with his girlfriend Natalie due to his frustration with the loss of his left leg in a prior accident. Nick visits his old friend Thomas and shoots him in the head. He then removes Thomas' left leg, puts it on ice and has it transplanted to himself by his doctor overnight. Nick goes through rehabilitation and eventually becomes able to move his transplanted leg. One night, while driving with Natalie, Nick loses control of his leg which steps on the accelerator, resulting in a crash that instantly kills Natalie. As two policemen arrive on the scene, they witness Nick stab himself to death, then The Man appears and kills them both. Meanwhile, a hit list is found in Kemper's old cell, containing the names and addresses of those responsible for his capture and their relatives, including the recent victims and Neilson himself. During his confinement, Kemper had also managed to give a copy of the list to The Man.

Richard is a reporter with a morbid obsession for extreme pornography and snuff films. He is chastised by his employer for misusing the work computer. Real footage of the Chechclear beheading plays on his computer screen. One day he finds a website offering real-time footage of people being attacked and tortured on commands issued by remote users. Richard's escalating obsession with the website causes him to lose his job and, eventually, his house. While attempting to log into the site from an internet cafe, he receives an email from an anonymous sender who reveals the location of the house where the live footage is filmed. Upon reaching the house, Richard is taken by the homeowner to the supposed location of the filming equipment, but instead he finds himself on the set of the snuff filming, where he is murdered by two masked men upon orders issued remotely by The Man. As his body is found and identified, Richard is revealed to be Neilson's son.

Determined to avenge his son and end the streak of killings, Neilson goes to the facility where Kemper is held and forces the staff to take him to Kemper's cell at gunpoint. He shoots Kemper in a leg and arm, but is immobilised by reinforcement guards before he can kill him. The Man, disguised as one of the guards, uses a machete to kill the director of the facility and the remaining guards, and is now revealed to be Kemper's son. Neilson shoots The Man, blowing half his head off, then delivers the fatal gunshot to Kemper. The Man however gets back on his feet and, with claws and tentacles emerging from the remaining half of his head, supposedly kills Neilson off-camera.

== Cast ==
- Dani Filth as The Man
- Emily Booth (as Emily Bouffante) as Mel
- Stuart Laing as Richard
- Edmund Dehn as Inspector Neilson
- Eileen Daly as Natalie
- Rebecca Eden as Sophie
- Louie Brownsell as Nick
- David McEwen as Kemper
- Adam Turner as The Short Man
- Emma Rice as Emma
- Melissa Forti as Nikki
- Al Stokes as The Old Man
- Barry Lee-Thomas as Chief Inspector Roper
- Sara Kunz (as Sarah Kunz) as Dr. Ross
- Mark Rathbone (as Mark Rossi) as Pringle
- Jordan Shelley (as J. Lawrence) as the Fat Comedian

== Release ==
Cradle of Fear has a chequered release history. Aside from the festival and convention circuit, the film never saw a cinema screen, and was released straight to video.

The UK distributors initially made it available as a mail order VHS title, on the grounds that this would allow the release of an uncut and unrated version, posted out from Europe and circumventing the BBFC (the assumption being that the BBFC would not pass the film without significant alterations). After long delays, these tapes were finally sent out, but, much to the producers' embarrassment, the film was passed completely uncut by the BBFC barely a month later, and picked up for exclusive distribution on DVD by the Blockbuster chain, who immediately sold it at a fraction of the price of the mail order tapes.

In 2006 the HMV chain signed an agreement with Pragmatic Pictures for UK distribution of the DVD version, which subsequently entered HMV's DVD Top 10 chart. The film is now widely available on DVD. In October, 2026, the film was added to the streaming platform Netflix.

== Reception ==
Critical reception for the film has been mixed to positive.

Adam Tyner from DVD Talk gave the film a mixed review stating that knowing that each character would meet their demise got in the way of any suspense. Digital Retribution gave the film a negative review, criticizing the film's poor execution, and overlong running time, calling the film a huge disappointment. Empire awarded the film four out of five stars, praising the film's creature effects and gore effects calling the film a must see for gore fans. Horror News.net gave the film a positive review praising the film's clever writing, acting, and gore effects calling the film's gore scenes "both terrifying and visceral". Bloody Disgusting awarded the film a score of 4 out of 5, complimenting the film's writing, music, performances, and frantic camerawork.
