= Frostland Tapes =

Compilation album by Darkthrone
- Released: 23 June 2008
- Recorded: 1988–1991 at various locations
- Genre: Death metal
- Label: Peaceville Records
- Producer: Darkthrone

Darkthrone chronology
F.O.A.D. (2007)	Frostland Tapes (2008)

Frostland Tapes is a compilation album by the Norwegian black metal band, Darkthrone. It was released through Peaceville Records on 23 June 2008.

The compilation contains Darkthrone's first four demos (Land of Frost, A New Dimension, Thulcandra, Cromlech), the original instrumental version of the Goatlord demo, and a recording of a concert in Denmark.

== Track listing ==
=== Disc 1 ===
Land of Frost (1988)

1. "Land of Frost"
2. "Winds of Triton"
3. "Forest of Darkness"
4. "Odyssey of Freedom"
5. "Day of the Dead"

A New Dimension (1988)

6. "Twilight Dimension"
7. "Snowfall"

Thulcandra (1989)

8. "Eon"
9. "Thulcandra"
10. "Archipelago"
11. "Soria Moria"

=== Disc 2 ===
Cromlech (1989)

1. "The Watchtower"
2. "Accumulation of Generalization"
3. "Sempiternal Past/Presence View Sepulchrality"
4. "Iconoclasm Sweeps Cappadocia"

Live in Denmark (1990)

5. "Cromlech"
6. "Sunrise over Locus Mortis"
7. "Soulside Journey"
8. "Accumulation of Generalization"
9. "Sempiternal Past/Presence View Sepulchrality"
10. "Iconoclasm Sweeps Cappadocia"
11. "Neptune Towers"

=== Disc 3 ===
Goatlord instrumental (1991)

1. "Rex"
2. "Pure Demoniac Blessing"
3. "The Grimness of which Shepherds Mourn"
4. "Sadomasochistic Rites"
5. "As Desertshadows"
6. "In His Lovely Kingdom"
7. "Black Daimon"
8. "Towards the Thornfields"
9. "(Birth of Evil) Virgin Sin"
10. "Green Cave Float"
11. "A Blaze in the Northern Sky"
12. "Fenriz Drum Solo"

== Credits ==
- Fenriz (Gylve Nagell) – drums, vocals
- Nocturno Culto (Ted Skjellum) – electric guitar, vocals
- Zephyrous (Ivar Enger) – electric guitar
- Anders Risberget – electric guitar (on Land of Frost only)
- Dag Nilsen – bass guitar
