= Oppegård =

Oppegård Municipality Oppegård kommune
- Municipality
- Flag Coat of arms

- Akershus within Norway

- Oppegård within Akershus
- Coordinates: 59°47′33″N 10°47′25″E
- Country: Norway
- County: Akershus
- District: Follo
- Administrative centre: Kolbotn

Government
  - Mayor (1995): Ildri Eidem Lovaas (H)

Area
  - Total: 37 km^{2} (14 sq mi)
  - Land: 34 km^{2} (13 sq mi)
  - Rank: #424 in Norway

Population (2008)
  - Total: 23,964
  - Rank: #37 in Norway
  - Density: 681/km^{2} (1,760/sq mi)
  - Change (10 years): ▲ +8%
- Demonym: Oppegårding

Official language
  - Norwegian form: Bokmål
- Time zone: UTC+01:00 (CET)
  - Summer (DST): UTC+02:00 (CEST)
- ISO 3166 code: NO-0217
- Website: Official website

Oppegård is an area in Nordre Follo, Akershus, Norway. Oppegård was a municipality in the county Akershus.

It is part of the traditional region of Follo. The administrative centre of the municipality was the village of Kolbotn. The municipality of Oppegård was separated from the municipality of Nesodden on 1 July 1915. Oppegård municipality had an area of 37 square kilometres (14.3 mi^{2}), hence it was the smallest municipality in Akershus by area.

On 1 January 2020, Oppegård municipality was merged with Ski into the new Nordre Follo municipality.

Within Oppegård, there is an eponymous village.

== Name ==
The municipality (originally the parish) is named after the old Oppegård farm (Old Norse: Uppigarðr), since the first church was built here. The first element is uppi which means "upper" and the last element is garðr which means "farm". (The farm is probably a part of an older and bigger farm.)

== Coat-of-arms ==
The coat-of-arms were granted on 6 August 1976. The arms show 17 gold triangles on a black background. The 17 triangles symbolize 17 trees, which again symbolize the 17 old farms in the municipality. Most of the farms lie in an area called Svartskog ('black forest'), so the arms are canting arms.

Number of minorities (1st and 2nd generation) in Oppegård by country of origin in 2017
Ancestry	Number
Poland	433
Pakistan	355
Sweden	340
Denmark	169
Somalia	159
Germany	149
Iran	133
Vietnam	128
Iraq	118
UK	111

== History ==
Oppegård has been populated since the end of the last ice age. Archeological remains of hunter-gatherer societies dating back to 5000–6000 BCE have been found, as well as the remains of agricultural settlements from 1000 to 2000 BCE. The main southern roads connecting Oslo to Sweden and Denmark have passed through Oppegård since the Iron Age.

19 farms from the Middle Ages, have been counted.

The former municipality was created from the eastern part of the municipality of Nesodden in 1915. At the time, the population of Oppegård was only 600. The 1960s and 1970s saw a population boom, as larger housing projects established the Oppegård villages as suburbs of Oslo. The commercial centres along the main railroad axis is examples of the functionalist architecture characteristic of that period of urbanization in Scandinavia.

Arctic explorer Roald Amundsen lived in Svartskog and his house is now a museum, administered by the municipality. Svartskog is also home to a medieval stone church, and is likely the oldest settlement in Oppegård.

== Politics ==
Since 1968, coinciding with the population boom, the Conservative Party of Norway (Høyre) has held either a majority or plurality of representatives in the municipal council. Several leading politicians for Høyre began their political careers as mayors of Oppegård, including Rolf Presthus (mayor from 1968 to 1970, Conservative Party Leader and Minister of Finance) and Jan Petersen (mayor from 1975 to 1981, Conservative Party Leader and Minister of Foreign Affairs). Oppegård is demographically an urban middle class area, demographically similar to Bærum and Asker and a traditional stronghold for Høyre.

Former Prime Minister and leader of the Christian Democratic Party Kjell Magne Bondevik lives in Oppegård.

Party representation in the Council 2007-2011

Conservatives: 15 Labour: 7 Progress Party: 4 Liberal Party: 2 Socialist Left: 2 Christian People's Party: 1

== Geography ==
Oppegård is located at the eastern coast of Bunnefjorden (originally called "Foli", like the Årungen lake to the south), which is an arm of Oslofjord. It includes the villages Oppegård, Svartskog, and Kolbotn. The landscape is dominated by a vast part of the north–south oriented lake Gjersjøen, which roughly divides the district into western and eastern sections. The lake Kolbotnvannet is located here as well. The undeveloped areas are largely covered by forest.

Oppegård is a largely residential suburb of Oslo, but also a business hub. It hosts the Norwegian headquarters of several larger corporations (including Kodak and IBM) within its borders. Tax revenues from large corporations made Oppegård one of Norway's richest municipalities in the 1980s and 1990s. These revenues, and the wealth they brought, were lost in the 2000s when corporations were made to pay taxes directly to the national government, rather than the local government.

Commuter trains connect Oppegård to Oslo, and makes the neighbourhoods close to the train stations (Rosenholm, Kolbotn, Solbråtan, Myrvoll, Greverud, and Oppegård) popular residential areas.

== Notable people ==
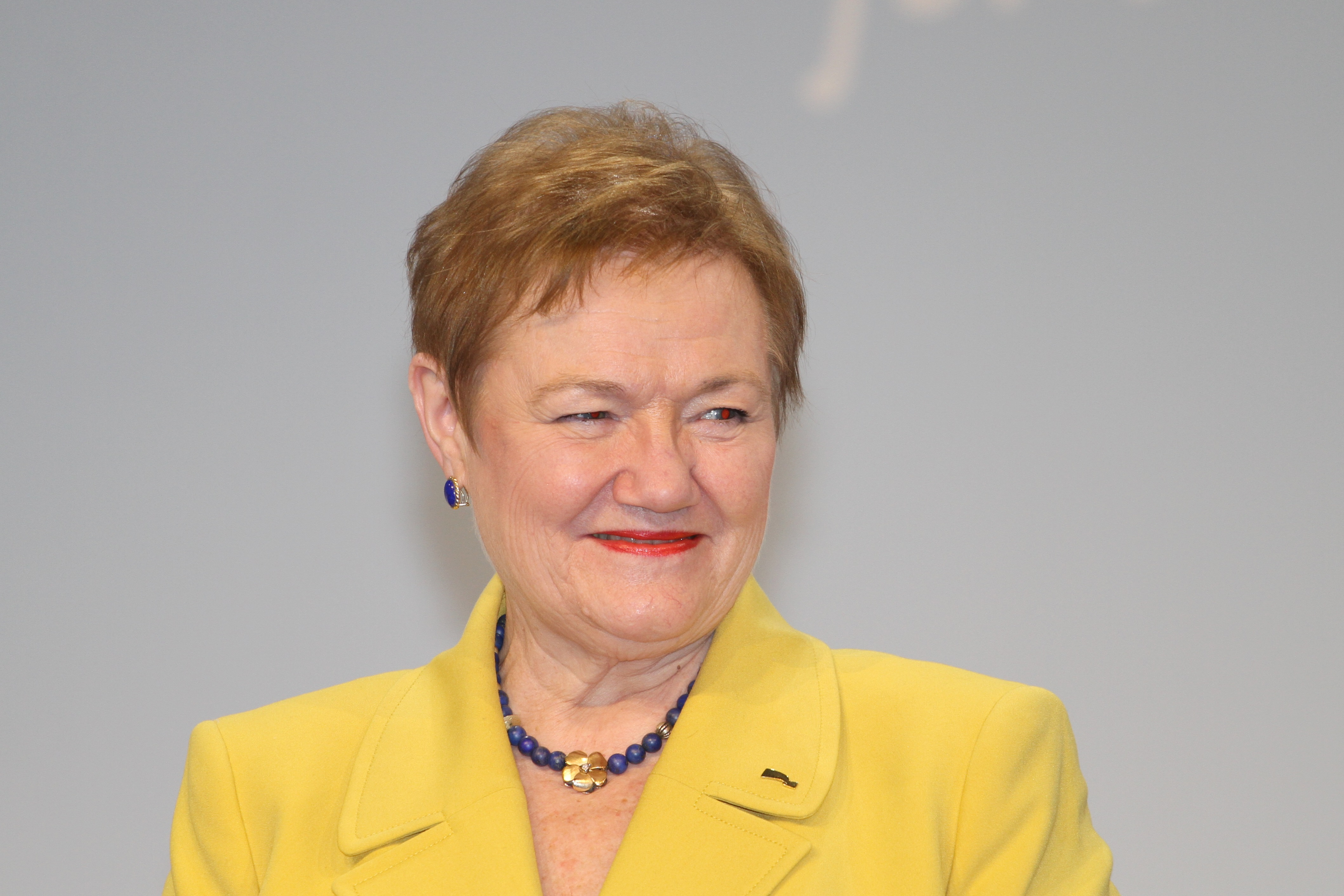
Sylvi Graham, 2017

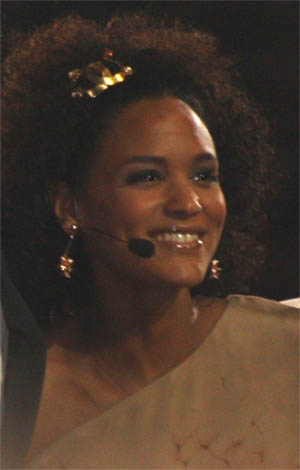
Haddy N'jie, 2010

- Jørgen Stubberud (1883 in Svartskog – 1980) polar explorer on the Amundsen's South Pole expedition, 1910 and 1912
- Liv Nergaard (1924 in Oppegård – 2016) a painter, textile artist, and sculptor
- Eva Bergh (1926 in Kolbotn – 2013) a Norwegian actress
- Tore Linné Eriksen (born 1945 in Kolbotn) a historian, focusing on Southern Africa
- Jan Petersen (born 1946) politician, Mayor of Oppegård, 1975 to 1981
- Sylvi Graham (born 1951) a Norwegian politician, Mayor of Oppegård 1995 to 2004
- Lisa Aisato (born 1981 in Kolbotn) a visual artist, illustrator and author of picture books
- Iman Meskini (born 1997 in Langhus) a Norwegian actress

=== Musicians ===
- Radka Toneff (d. 1982), jazz singer, grew up in Kolbotn
- Eivind Aarset (born 1961 in Kolbotn) a Norwegian jazz guitarist
- Øyvind Sauvik (born 1976) stage name Vinni, a musician and hip hop artist, works in Kolbotn
- Haddy N'jie (born 1979 in Kolbotn) a singer, songwriter, writer and journalist
- Siri Wålberg (born 1980 in Oppegård) a Norwegian pop singer / songwriter
- Eivind Lønning (born 1983 in Kolbotn) a jazz trumpeter
- Joakim With Steen (born 1989 in Kolbotn) stage name Jowst, a music producer and songwriter
- Gylve Fenris Nagell, known as Fenriz (Born 1971 in Kolbotn), drummer for Darkthrone
- Ted Skjellum, known as Nocturno Culto (Born 1972 in Kolbotn), vocalist for Darkthrone

== Sister cities ==
The following cities are twinned with Oppegård:

- - Hvidovre, Region Hovedstaden, Denmark
- - Širvintos, Vilnius County, Lithuania
- - Sollentuna, Stockholm County, Sweden
- - Tuusula, Uusimaa, Finland
