= Ill Innocence =

Album by Gallhammer

Studio album by Gallhammer
- Released: 2007
- Recorded: 2006
- Genre: Black metal, doom metal, crust punk
- Length: 50:31
- Label: Peaceville Records
- Producer: Makoto Fujishima

Gallhammer chronology
Gloomy Lights (2004)	Ill Innocence (2007)	The End (2011)

Professional ratings
Review scores
Source	Rating
Allmusic	3/5 stars

Ill Innocence is the second full-length studio album by the Japanese metal band Gallhammer. It was released in 2007, and helped secure the band's recognition within the extreme metal subculture.

== Track listing ==
No.	Title	Writer(s)	Length
1.	"At the Onset of the Age of Despair"	Vivian Slaughter	7:49
2.	"Speed of Blood"	Vivian Slaughter	3:07
3.	"Blind My Eyes"	Vivian Slaughter, Risa Reaper	3:23
4.	"Delirium Daydream"	Vivian Slaughter	3:25
5.	"Ripper in the Gloom"	Vivian Slaughter	4:33
6.	"Killed by the Queen"	Vivian Slaughter	2:23
7.	"Song of Fall"	Mika Penetrator	6:19
8.	"World to be Ashes"	Vivian Slaughter	4:08
9.	"SLOG"	Vivian Slaughter	8:35
10.	"Long Scary Dream"	Vivian Slaughter	6:46
Total length:			50:28

== Personnel ==
Gallhammer

- Mika Penetrator - vocals, guitars
- Vivian Slaughter - vocals, bass
- Risa Reaper - drums, vocals

Additional personnel

- Makoto Fujishima - recording, mixing
- Nocturno Culto - mastering
- Trine Paulsen - design
- Kim Sølve - design

== External ==
- Ill Innocence at Discogs (list of releases)
