= Under a Funeral Moon =

Studio album by Darkthrone
- Released: 15 February 1993
- Recorded: June 1992
- Studios: Creative Studios (Kolbotn, Norway)
- Genre: Black metal
- Length: 40:37
- Languages: English, Norwegian
- Label: Peaceville
- Producer: Darkthrone

Darkthrone chronology
| A Blaze in the Northern Sky (1992) | Under a Funeral Moon (1993) | Transilvanian Hunger (1994) |

Under a Funeral Moon is the third studio album by Norwegian black metal band Darkthrone. It was recorded in June 1992 and released on 15 February 1993 by Peaceville Records. Written and recorded to create a "pure black metal album", it is the second of what is dubbed the band's "Unholy Trinity", with A Blaze in the Northern Sky and Transilvanian Hunger. Under a Funeral Moon was the last album with guitarist Zephyrous (Ivar Enger), who left the band shortly after its release.

== Background and recording ==
Darkthrone's previous album, A Blaze in the Northern Sky, is regarded as their first black metal release, although it kept some of the band's earlier death metal sound. Drummer and songwriter Fenriz said that Darkthrone began writing Under a Funeral Moon in late 1991 to create a "pure black metal album".

The album was recorded at Creative Studios in Kolbotn in June 1992. The band used the studio production to create a sound that was more "cold" and "grim". AllMusic journalist Eduardo Rivadavia wrote: "The record's songs—already shorter and more focused than those of its epic-filled predecessor—were buried under disfiguring cobwebs of fuzzy amp distortion". Death Metal Underground notes that the album represented an "aesthetic shift" in the genre, making Darkthrone the first black metal band to have distortion define the whole of the studio production rather than just that of guitars.

== Release ==
Under a Funeral Moon was released by Peaceville on 15 February 1993. The cover artwork featured vocalist Nocturno Culto, who regards the writing and recording of the album as the foundation for Darkthrone's later work.

The album was remastered and reissued by Peaceville in 2003, repackaged in a cardboard digipak. It was also released by Back on Black in the form of a limited edition (2,000 copies) picture disc LP. The third chapter of a four-part video interview with Fenriz and Nocturno Culto (spanning the first four albums) was included as bonus material.

== Critical reception ==
Professional ratings
Review scores
| Source | Rating |
|---|---|
| AllMusic | 4/5 stars |
| Collector's Guide to Heavy Metal | 8/10 |
| Metal Storm | 9.3/10 |
| Rock Hard | 5.0/10 |
| Sputnikmusic | 5/5 stars |

In his retrospective review of the album, Eduardo Rivadavia from AllMusic called Under a Funeral Moon "essential black metal listening". He wrote that it "built upon the radical career reinvention undertaken on the previous year's A Blaze in the Northern Sky" and noted that it is considered "the second volume in Darkthrone's so-called 'unholy trinity' of form- and era-defining black metal albums".

J Andrew of Metal Injection wrote that the album "represents the true essence of black metal". Comparing it with the albums before and after, he said "what makes Under a Funeral Moon special is that it's more pure black metal than Blaze, but still has more variation than Transilvanian Hunger".

In 2013, Decibel ranked Under a Funeral Moon at number 24 on its list of the Top 100 Black Metal Albums of All Time.

== Track listing ==
All tracks are written by Fenriz, except where noted.

| No. | Title | Music | Length |
|---|---|---|---|
| 1. | "Natassja in Eternal Sleep" | Nocturno Culto | 3:33 |
| 2. | "Summer of the Diabolical Holocaust" | | 5:18 |
| 3. | "The Dance of Eternal Shadows" | Nocturno Culto | 3:43 |
| 4. | "Unholy Black Metal" | Zephyrous | 3:30 |
| 5. | "To Walk the Infernal Fields" | | 7:50 |
| 6. | "Under a Funeral Moon" | | 5:06 |
| 7. | "Inn i de dype skogers favn" ("Into the embrace of the deep woods") | Zephyrous | 5:25 |
| 8. | "Crossing the Triangle of Flames" | | 6:12 |
| Total length: | | | 40:37 |

== Credits ==
Darkthrone

- Fenriz – drums, lyrics
- Nocturno Culto – bass guitar, vocals
- Zephyrous – lead guitar

Production

- Vidar – engineer
