= Neptune Towers =

Norwegian ambient music project

- Origin: Kolbotn, Norway
- Genres: Space; dark ambient
- Years active: 1993–1995
- Labels: Moonfog, Peaceville
- Past members: Fenriz

Neptune Towers was a ambient music side project formed in 1993 by Fenriz of Darkthrone. He released two albums under this name, Caravans to Empire Algol (1994) and Transmissions from Empire Algol (1995), both issued by Moonfog Productions. Fenriz began recording a third Neptune Towers album, Space Lab, in 1994, but it was not finished. Both albums were reissued by Peaceville Records in 2012, with excerpts from Space Lab appended to Transmissions from Empire Algol.

== Musical style ==
Fenriz described Neptune Towers as "avant garde astral/alien synth", and credited Kraftwerk, Tangerine Dream and (former Tangerine Dream member) Klaus Schulze as influences for the music.

== Discography ==
=== Studio albums ===
- Caravans to Empire Algol (1994, Moonfog Productions)
- Transmissions from Empire Algol (1995, Moonfog Productions)

== See also ==
- List of ambient music artists
