= Goatlord =

Goatlord may refer to:

- Baphomet, a pagan deity
- Goatlord (band), a U.S. black/death/doom metal band
- Goatlord (album), an album by black metal band Darkthrone
- "Goatlord", a 2012 song by Goat from World Music
