= Vinterskugge =

Compilation album by Isengard
- Released: 1994
- Genre: Black metal Death metal Folk metal
- Length: 64:30
- Label: Peaceville
- Producer: Fenriz

Isengard chronology
Vinterskugge (1994)	Høstmørke (1995)

Professional ratings
Review scores
Source	Rating
Kerrang!	2/5 stars

Vinterskugge is the first full-length release by the Norwegian black metal band Isengard. It is actually a combination of three demo tapes released between 1989 and 1993, which explains the difference in sound between the releases, with the earlier recordings predating the second wave of black metal and resembling death metal more closely.

- Tracks 1–7 taken from the "Vandreren" '93 demo.
- Tracks 8–12 taken from the "Spectres Over Gorgoroth" '89 demo.
- Tracks 13–16 taken from the "Horizons" '91 demo.

== Track listing ==
Vandreren demo (1993)

1. "Vinterskugge" - 5:15
2. "Gjennom Skogen til Blåfjellene" - 5:51
3. "Ut i Vannets dyp Hvor Morket Hviler" - 4:19
4. "Dommedagssalme" - 5:06
5. "In the Halls and Chambers of Stardust - The Crystallic Heavens Open" - 2:33
6. "Fanden Lokker til Stupet (Nytrad)" - 2:43
7. "Naglfar" - 5:29

Spectres Over Gorgoroth demo (1989)

8. "Thy Gruesome Death" - 2:16
9. "Deathcult" - 1:55
10. "Rise from Below" - 3:12
11. "Dark Lord of Gorgoroth" - 2:26
12. "Trollwandering (Outro)" - 1:29

Horizons demo (1991)

13. "The Fog" - 4:35
14. "Storm of Evil" - 6:02
15. "Bergtrollets Gravferd" - 5:31
16. "Our Lord will Come" - 5:48

== Credits ==
- Fenriz - vocals, guitars, bass, drums, synth.
