= Transilvanian Hunger =

Studio album by Darkthrone
- Released: 17 February 1994
- Recorded: November–December 1993
- Studio: Necrohell Studios
- Genre: Black metal
- Length: 39:00
- Languages: English, Norwegian
- Label: Peaceville
- Producer: Darkthrone

Darkthrone chronology
Under a Funeral Moon (1993)	Transilvanian Hunger (1994)	Panzerfaust (1995)

Professional ratings
Review scores
Source	Rating
AllMusic	4.5/5 stars
Collector's Guide to Heavy Metal	5/10

Transilvanian Hunger is the fourth studio album by Norwegian black metal band Darkthrone. It was released 17 February 1994 by Peaceville Records. It is the third and final album of what is dubbed the band's "Unholy Trinity", along with A Blaze in the Northern Sky and Under a Funeral Moon.

== Recording ==
Transilvanian Hunger was the first Darkthrone album to be recorded as a duo (Nocturno Culto and Fenriz), which was a direct result of Zephyrous's departure from the band the previous year.

Fenriz performed all instrumentation on the album, with Nocturno Culto adding vocals. As of 2024, this and Panzerfaust have been the only Darkthrone albums with this type of arrangement (although Fenriz also performs spoken word vocals on the Panzerfaust outro). Transilvanian Hunger was recorded on a 4-track recorder set up in Fenriz's bedroom (dubbed "Necrohell Studios" by the band). Lyrics for four of the album's songs were written by the Norwegian black metal musician Varg Vikernes, who performed solo as Burzum.

== Release and controversy ==
The cover art was a black-and-white photograph of Fenriz with a candelabrum, which bore a likeness to the cover of Mayhem's 1993 live album Live in Leipzig. The back cover stated that "Darkthrone is for all the evil in man" and listed the slogan "True Norwegian Black Metal".

Originally, the back cover also bore the words "Norsk Arisk Black Metal" ("Norwegian Aryan black metal"). Due to negative feedback from many distributors, however, the phrase was removed. The band also intended to issue another controversial statement to mark the album's release: "We would like to state that Transilvanian Hunger stands beyond any criticism. If any man should attempt to criticize this LP, he should be thoroughly patronized for his obviously Jewish behavior". In a press release, Peaceville Records issued both this statement and their own response, berating the sentiment but acknowledging that they could not censor their artists. Darkthrone issued a formal apology at Peaceville's behest. They said they had used "Arisk" to mean "true" or "pure" and that "Jewish" was Norwegian youth slang for "idiotic". Darkthrone included the following statement with their next album, Panzerfaust, the following year: "Darkthrone is certainly not a Nazi band nor a political band. Those of you who still might think so, you can lick Mother Mary's asshole in eternity". More recently, Fenriz disowned these past statements, describing them as "disgusting". He admitted regret and noted that at the time, he was going through a phase of being "angry at several races".

The ending of the track "As Flittermice as Satans Spys" contained a backmasked message. When the voice is played backwards, it utters the phrase: "In the name of God, let the churches burn".

In 2003, the album was remastered and reissued by Peaceville, as well as being repackaged in a cardboard digipak. The fourth and final chapter of a four-part video interview (spanning the first four albums) with Fenriz and Nocturno Culto was also included as bonus material.

== Legacy ==
In 2013, Decibel ranked Transilvanian Hunger at number 17 on its list of the Top 100 Black Metal Albums of All Time. In 2017, Rolling Stone placed it at number 85 on its list of the 100 Greatest Metal Albums of All Time.

== Track listing ==
All lyrics are written by Fenriz (tracks 1–4) and Greifi Grishnackh (tracks 5–8); all music is composed by Fenriz.

No.	Title	Length
1.	"Transilvanian Hunger"	6:09
2.	"Over fjell og gjennom torner" ("Over Mountains and Through Thorns")	2:29
3.	"Skald av Satans sol" ("Bard of Satan's Sun")	4:28
4.	"Slottet i det fjerne" ("Castle in the Distance")	4:45
5.	"Graven tåkeheimens saler" ("Halls of the Tomb of the Fog Kingdom")	4:59
6.	"I en hall med flesk og mjød" ("In a Hall with Meat and Mead")	5:12
7.	"As Flittermice as Satans Spys"	5:55
8.	"En ås i dype skogen" ("A Hill in the Deep Forest")	5:03
Total length:		39:00

== Personnel ==
Darkthrone

- Nocturno Culto – vocals
- Fenriz – guitar, bass guitar, drums, lyrics (tracks 1–4)

Other

- Greifi Grishnackh – lyrics (tracks 5–8)
