= A Blaze in the Northern Sky =

1992 studio album by Darkthrone

Studio album by Darkthrone
- Released: 26 February 1992
- Recorded: August 1991
- Studios: Creative Studios in Kolbotn, Norway
- Genre: Black metal
- Length: 42:02
- Label: Peaceville
- Producer: Darkthrone

Darkthrone chronology
Soulside Journey (1991)	A Blaze in the Northern Sky (1992)	Under a Funeral Moon (1993)

A Blaze in the Northern Sky is the second studio album and the debut black metal album by the Norwegian black metal band Darkthrone. It was recorded at Creative Studios in August 1991 and released on 26 February 1992 by Peaceville Records. In addition to earlier rehearsal recordings made between March 1991 and the Norwegian summer holidays (later released as a demo compilation in 2016), the album features the band's first official black metal recordings and is regarded as a classic within the genre. It is the first album of what fans refer to as the "Unholy Trinity," with the other albums being Under a Funeral Moon and Transilvanian Hunger. This album was the last to feature bassist Dag Nilsen. In 2020, it was included in the National Library of Norway's permanent exhibition due to its significance to Norwegian culture and its role as a foundational work in Norwegian black metal.

== Background ==
Darkthrone's first album, 1991's Soulside Journey, was a Swedish-styled death metal release. Following the recording of Soulside Journey, the band began crafting songs that were recorded on an instrumental demo later released as Goatlord.

After the completion of Goatlord, three of the band members—Fenriz, Nocturno Culto, and Zephyrous—resolved to focus on creating black metal music. Bassist Nilsen was opposed to this shift in direction and subsequently left the band; however, he agreed to record his bass parts for the album as a session musician. A Blaze in the Northern Sky was recorded in August 1991 at Creative Studios in Kolbotn, the same studio where Mayhem recorded their influential Deathcrush EP. In an interview, Fenriz noted that the album felt somewhat "rushed" and that many of the songs featured "death metal guitar riffs" performed in a "black metal style."

Due to Darkthrone's abrupt transition from death metal to black metal, Peaceville was initially unwilling to release the album. The label was taken aback, having expected the band to continue producing death metal in the vein of Soulside Journey. Peaceville ultimately agreed to release the album only if they could remix it, asserting that the sound was "too weak." In response, the band threatened to release the album through Deathlike Silence Productions, the label owned by Øystein "Euronymous" Aarseth of Mayhem (to whom the album is dedicated). However, Peaceville eventually acquiesced, allowing the album to be released as originally recorded.

== Release ==
The album was released by Peaceville on 26 February 1992. The first CD pressing was limited to 2,000 copies and featured a white disc. The front cover displayed Ivar Enger (Zephyrous), the band's rhythm guitarist.

In 2003, the album was remastered and reissued by Peaceville, repackaged in a cardboard digipak. This release also included the second chapter of a four-part video interview with Fenriz and Nocturno, covering the band's first four albums. A Blaze in the Northern Sky was reissued again by Peaceville in December 2009 as a double gatefold LP on 180-gram vinyl, limited to 2,000 copies.

== Critical reception ==
Professional ratings
Review scores
Source	Rating
AllMusic	5/5 stars
Collector's Guide to Heavy Metal	8/10
Pitchfork	9.2/10
Rock Hard	9.0/10
Sputnikmusic	4.5/5 stars

In his retrospective review of the album, Eduardo Rivadavia from AllMusic described the album as "a classic whose almost indefensibly lo-fi standards would reinvigorate an entire strain of black metal." Channing Freeman of Sputnikmusic characterized the album as "triumphant," highlighting its balanced blend of "frozen production and guttural screams" alongside "a sense of community." In his recap of Darkthrone's history for Pitchfork, Sam Sodomsky called A Blaze in the Northern Sky "a revelation" and described the music as a mix of "old-school riffs, gurgling spoken-word interludes, noisy solos that grind up against the infernal blast beats in a kind of sonic battlefield."

In 2009, IGN included A Blaze in the Northern Sky in its "10 Great Black Metal Albums" list, while a 2007 article in Decibel magazine labeled it "the first truly blackened death metal album." Kerrang! referred to it as "a dark watershed for the black metal genre," describing the song "In the Shadow of the Horns" as "seven minutes of defiant lo-fi production, frostbitten purpose, and blunt-force simplicity." In 2013, Decibel ranked A Blaze in the Northern Sky at number three on its list of the Top 100 Black Metal Albums of All Time.

== Track listing ==
All lyrics are written by Fenriz; all music is composed by Darkthrone.

No.	Title	Length
1.	"Kathaarian Life Code"	10:39
2.	"In the Shadow of the Horns"	7:01
3.	"Paragon Belial"	5:24
4.	"Where Cold Winds Blow"	7:26
5.	"A Blaze in the Northern Sky"	4:57
6.	"The Pagan Winter"	6:35
Total length:		42:02

== Personnel ==
Darkthrone

- Nocturno Culto – lead guitar, vocals
- Zephyrous – rhythm guitar
- Fenriz – drums, backing vocals

Additional musicians

- Dag Nilsen – bass guitar

Production

- Erik Avnskog – engineer
- Dave Pybus – album cover design
