= Gallhammer =

Japanese extreme metal band

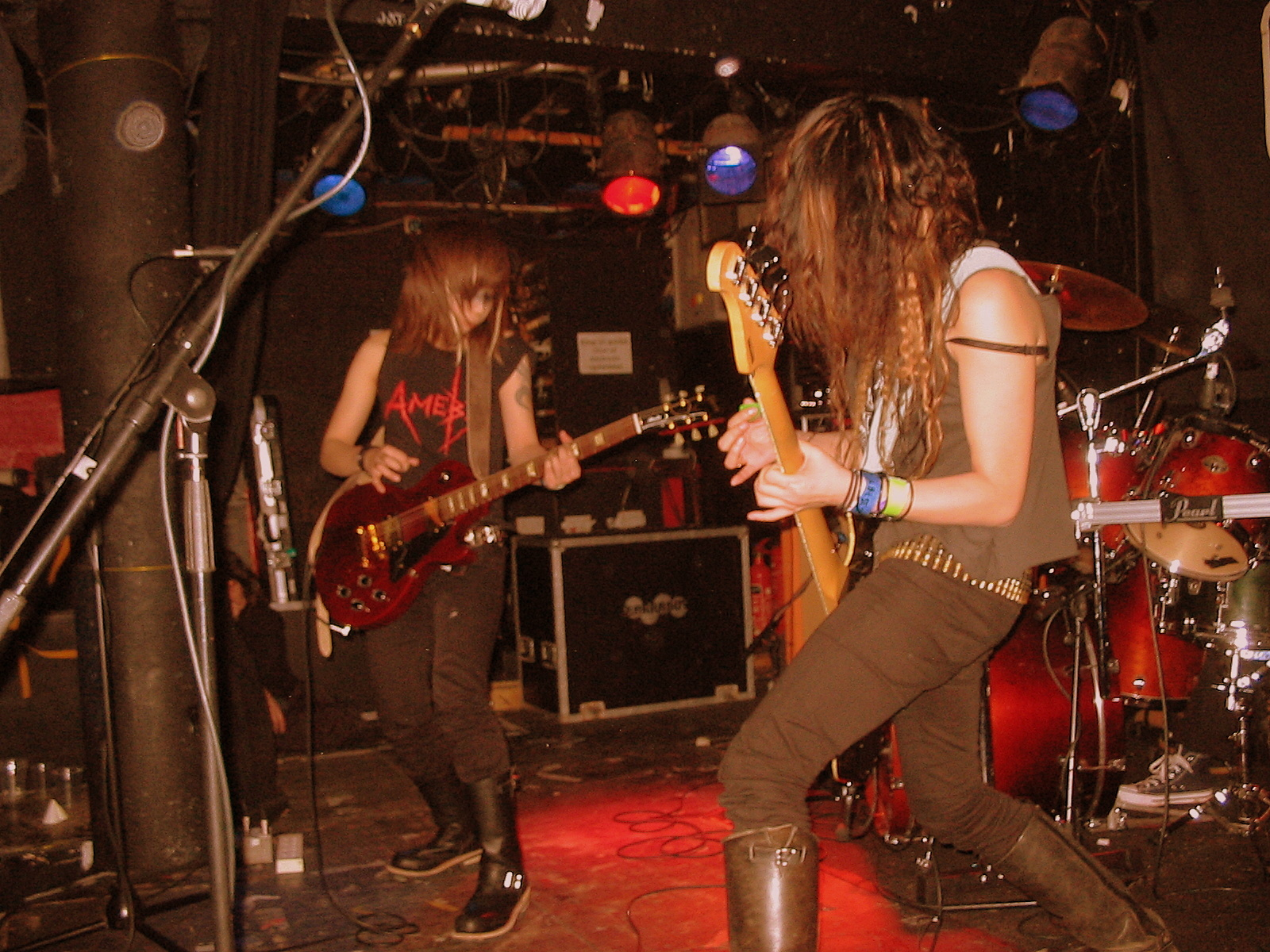
- Gallhammer performing in Glasgow, 2008

Background information
- Origin: Tokyo, Japan
- Genres: Doom metal; black metal; crust punk
- Years active: 2003–2013
- Label: Peaceville
- Members: Vivian Slaughter; Risa Reaper
- Past members: Mika Penetrator

Gallhammer (/ˈɡælhæmər/) were a Japanese extreme metal group that drew on black metal, doom metal and crust punk. They formed in Tokyo in 2003 and released three studio albums.

The final lineup consisted of Vivian Slaughter (vocals, bass guitar) and Risa Reaper (vocals, drums). The original lineup included Mika Penetrator (vocals, guitar).

== Biography ==
Their first recording, a free demo tape limited to 30 copies, was distributed at their first show at Koiwa Death Fest Vol.2, around March 2003, in Japan. In July of that year, they released a self-titled demo. By April of the following year, they had released another demo, Endless Nauseous Days, and were working on their debut eight-track album, Gloomy Lights, released in November 2004 through Hello From The Gutter Records.

In January 2006, Gallhammer signed to Peaceville Records, recommended by Darkthrone. The CD/DVD The Dawn of..., was released, containing a CD, demo and rehearsal footage, and a DVD recording of Gallhammer performing in Okayama and five concerts in Tokyo.

Gallhammer released their second full-length album, Ill Innocence, through Peaceville Records in September 2007, followed by a European tour. In March 2008, they did a second European tour. They played at the Inferno Metal Festival in June.

Guitarist Mika Penetrator left before their third LP, The End, released in 2011. The band continued as a bass-drum duo. Allmusic.com reviewer Phil Freeman said, "this has changed their musical style quite a bit; the thrashing punk metal of 2004's Gloomy Lights and 2007's Ill Innocence can still be heard on songs like "Rubbish CG202" and "Entropy G35," but tracks like "Aberration," "Sober," and the title cut are totally different—slow, sludgy death marches that owe more to Flipper and the Melvins than black metal."

Gallhammer appeared in Nocturno Culto's film The Misanthrope: The Existence of Solitude and Chaos.

== Influences ==
In an interview with Contraband Candy, Vivian Slaughter cited Hellhammer, Celtic Frost, Amebix and Burzum as Gallhammer's main musical influences. Slaughter is also a passionate fan of Judas Priest, and once called Corrupted "the greatest band in the world". She says she was first inspired to play music after seeing Napalm Death and Painkiller in concert.

Lisa Reaper is a fan of old school techno, krautrock, Kraftwerk and Laibach.

The band's other influences include Joy Division, Antisect, Carcass, Cathedral, Morbid Angel and Scorn. The group is also inspired by Japanoise and have collaborated with Incapacitants.

While the group borrows from crust and anarcho-punk, they do not identify with a particular political outlook.

== Members ==
Current

- Vivian Slaughter – lead vocals, bass
- Lisa Reaper – drums, backing vocals

Former

- Mika Penetrator – guitars, backing vocals (2003–2010)

== Discography ==
Studio albums

- Gloomy Lights (2003)
- Ill Innocence (2007)
- The End (2011)

Other albums

- The First Reh-Tape (demo) (2003)
- Gallhammer (demo) (2003)
- Endless Nauseous Days (demo) (2004)
- Beyond The Hatred (EP) (2007)
- The Dawn of... (compilation) (2007)
- A Taste of Despair (EP) (2010)

Videos

- The Dawn of... (2007)
- Ruin of a Church (2008)
