= Arctic Thunder (album) =

Studio album by Darkthrone
- Released: 14 October 2016
- Recorded: August–December 2015
- Studio: Necrohell II Studios
- Genre: Black metal; heavy metal
- Length: 39:23
- Label: Peaceville
- Producer: Darkthrone

Darkthrone chronology
The Underground Resistance (2013)	Arctic Thunder (2016)	Old Star (2019)

Professional ratings
Review scores
Source	Rating
Metal Injection	8/10 stars
Pitchfork	7.2 stars on a 10-point scale

Arctic Thunder is the 16th studio album by Norwegian band Darkthrone. It was released 14 October 2016 by Peaceville Records. It was recorded from August to December 2015 at Necrohell II Studios. The first single from the album was "Tundra Leech".

The album was named after a Norwegian metal band, active from 1985 to 1989. Darkthrone received permission to use the name. The album's music is a combination of the band's 90's black metal sound with the classic heavy metal influence of their previous record.

== Track listing ==
No.	Title	Lyrics	Music	Length
1.	"Tundra Leech"	Fenriz	Fenriz	5:02
2.	"Burial Bliss"	Nocturno Culto	Nocturno Culto	4:59
3.	"Boreal Fiends"	Fenriz	Fenriz	5:50
4.	"Inbred Vermin"	Nocturno Culto	Nocturno Culto	5:49
5.	"Arctic Thunder"	Fenriz	Fenriz	4:41
6.	"Throw Me Through the Marshes"	Fenriz	Nocturno Culto	5:00
7.	"Deep Lake Trespass"	Nocturno Culto	Nocturno Culto	4:48
8.	"The Wyoming Distance"	Fenriz	Fenriz	3:14
Total length:				39:23

== Personnel ==
Darkthrone

- Nocturno Culto – vocals, electric guitar, bass guitar on tracks 2, 4, 6 and 7
- Fenriz – drums, additional electric guitar, bass guitar on tracks 1, 3, 5 and 8

Production

- Nocturno Culto – mixing, engineering
- Jack Control – mastering
- Matthew Vickerstaff – design, illustration
- Fenriz – art direction

== Charts ==
Chart (2016)	Peak position
Belgian Albums (Ultratop Wallonia)	142
Finnish Albums (Suomen virallinen lista)	40
German Albums (Offizielle Top 100)	56
Scottish Albums (OCC)	68
US Heatseekers Albums (Billboard)	8
