= Gloomy Lights =

Studio album by Gallhammer
- Released: 2004
- Recorded: 2003
- Genre: Black metal, doom metal, crust punk
- Label: Goatsucker Records (Mexico); Hello From the Gutter Records (Japan); Bestial Burst Records (Finland); Peaceville Records (Reissue)

Gallhammer chronology
Gloomy Lights (2004)	Ill Innocence (2007)

Professional ratings
Review scores
Source	Rating
Metal Storm	8.5/10

Gloomy Lights is the first full-length studio album by the Japanese metal band Gallhammer.

== Track listing ==
All lyrics and music by Vivian Slaughter and Gallhammer.

No.	Title	Length
1.	"Endless Nauseous Days"	5:48
2.	"Crucifixion"	4:30
3.	"Tomurai: May Our Father Die"	4:34
4.	"Beyond the Hate Red"	2:51
5.	"Lost My Self"	3:17
6.	"State of Gloom"	3:57
7.	"Aloof and Proud Silence"	5:18
8.	"Color of Coma"	10:07
Total length:		40:22

Peaceville Records reissue bonus tracks
No.	Title	Length
9.	"Blossom in the Raven River"	3:48
10.	"Lust Satan Death"	4:17
Total length:		48:27

== Personnel ==
- Mika Penetrator – vocals, guitars
- Vivian Slaughter – vocals, bass
- Risa Reaper – vocals, drums

== External ==
- Gloomy Lights at Discogs (list of releases)
