= Underground resistance =

Underground resistance may refer to:

- Underground Resistance (band), a musical collective from Detroit, Michigan, United States
- Underground resistance during World War II, the inhabitants of various locales resisting the rule of the Nazis, the Empire of Japan, and Mussolini
- Resistance movement, a group opposing an occupier or state by violent or nonviolent means
- The Underground Resistance, 2013 album by Darkthrone
