= Hate Them =

Studio album by Darkthrone
- Released: 10 March 2003
- Recorded: December 2002
- Studios: Pan lydstudio (Oslo, Norway)
- Genre: Black metal
- Length: 38:47
- Label: Moonfog Productions
- Producer: Darkthrone

Darkthrone chronology
Plaguewielder (2001)	Hate Them (2003)	Sardonic Wrath (2004)

Professional ratings
Review scores
Source	Rating
AllMusic	3/5 stars
Alternative Press	3/5

Hate Them is the ninth studio album by Norwegian black metal band, Darkthrone. It was released 10 March 2003 by Moonfog Productions. Like their subsequent release, Sardonic Wrath, the album had an electronic intro and outro created by Lars Sørensen (aka LRZ) from Red Harvest. The cover image was the work of Eric Syre from Thesyre, and incorporated images of the Sagrada Família Catholic church in Barcelona. In 2012, the album was reissued by Peaceville Records, including a bonus CD with audio commentary by the band.

== Track listing ==
All lyrics are written by Fenriz.

No.	Title	Music	Length
1.	"Rust"	Nocturno Culto	6:45
2.	"Det svartner nå" (It Darkens Now)	Fenriz	5:37
3.	"Fucked Up and Ready to Die"	Nocturno Culto	3:44
4.	"Ytterst i livet" (On the Edge of Life)	Nocturno Culto	5:25
5.	"Divided We Stand"	Fenriz	5:18
6.	"Striving for a Piece of Lucifer"	Nocturno Culto	5:31
7.	"In Honour of Thy Name"	Fenriz	6:27

== Credits ==
=== Darkthrone ===
- Nocturno Culto – vocals, guitar, bass
- Fenriz – drums, lyrics

=== Production ===
- Lars Klokkerhaug – engineering
- Tom Kvålsvoll – mastering
- Martin Kvamme – layout
- Eric Syre – artwork
- Nocturno Culto – layout
