= Morta Skuld =

American death metal band

Morta Skuld is an American death metal band from Milwaukee formed in 1989. They were signed to Peaceville Records. Their early demos were later reissued by Relapse Records. In March 2024, Morta Skuld performed a series of record-release shows with Skeletal Remains and Oxygen Destroyer.

== Musical style and influences ==
The band is known for playing an old school death metal style, according to Decibel. Online music magazine Invisible Oranges described the sound as "bread-and-butter death metal", and said it was more comparable to the Florida death metal style than that of other Peaceville artists such as My Dying Bride and Darkthrone. They have cited Suffocation, Immolation, Obituary and Death as influences. New Noise Magazine also observed influence from bands such as Deicide, Morbid Angel and Malevolent Creation present in their music.

== Reception ==
New Noise Magazine called Morta Skuld "scene veterans and death metal masters". The band's debut album Dying Remains is considered by some to be an overlooked entry in the genre. Invisible Oranges stated the opinion that the album "is an underrated old-school death metal banger, released perhaps a few years too late to impact the genre at large but held in high regard by those who’ve heard it."
