= Panzerfaust (album) =

Studio album by Darkthrone
- Released: 5 June 1995
- Recorded: February–April 1994
- Studio: Necrohell Studios
- Genre: Black metal
- Length: 39:00
- Language: Norwegian, English
- Label: Moonfog
- Producer: Darkthrone

Darkthrone chronology
Transilvanian Hunger (1994)	Panzerfaust (1995)	Total Death (1996)

Professional ratings
Review scores
Source	Rating
Collector's Guide to Heavy Metal	8/10
Sputnikmusic	4/5 stars

Panzerfaust is the fifth studio album by Norwegian black metal band Darkthrone, released in June 1995 by Moonfog Productions (Europe) and The End Records (North America). The track "Quintessence" featured lyrics by Varg Vikernes, their second and final album to do so. As with the previous album Transilvanian Hunger, all instruments on Panzerfaust were recorded solely by Fenriz on a 4-track recorder set up in his bedroom (dubbed "Necrohell Studios" by the band); with Nocturno Culto performing vocals on all songs except for the outro.

In October 2010, Panzerfaust was reissued by Peaceville Records as a two-disc edition, with the second disc featuring Fenriz discussing the making of the album and the subject matter of the songs. In this commentary, Fenriz cited Celtic Frost's Morbid Tales (1984), Bathory's Under the Sign of the Black Mark (1987), and Vader's Necrolust (1989) as key riff inspirations.

== Track listing ==
All lyrics are written by Fenriz, except where noted; all music is composed by Darkthrone, except where noted.

No.	Title	Lyrics	Music	Length
1.	"En vind av sorg" ("A Wind of Sorrow")			6:21
2.	"Triumphant Gleam"			4:24
3.	"The Hordes of Nebulah"			5:33
4.	"Hans siste vinter" ("His Last Winter")			4:50
5.	"Beholding the Throne of Might"			6:06
6.	"Quintessence"	Greifi Grishnackh		7:38
7.	"Snø og granskog (Utferd)" ("Snow and Spruce Forest (Outro)")	Tarjei Vesaas	Fenriz	4:08
Total length:				39:00

== Personnel ==
- Nocturno Culto – lead vocals
- Fenriz – guitar, bass, drums, synths, spoken word vocals
