= Transmissions from Empire Algol =

Studio album by Neptune Towers
- Released: 1995
- Recorded: April–May 1994
- Genre: Space; dark ambient
- Length: 34:58
- Label: Moonfog
- Producer: Fenriz

Neptune Towers chronology
Caravans to Empire Algol (1994)	Transmissions from Empire Algol (1995)

Transmissions from Empire Algol is the second and final studio album by the Norwegian ambient music project Neptune Towers, a similar-sounding follow-up to 1994's Caravans to Empire Algol, expanding on the same concept. It was released in 1995 by Moonfog Productions. Excerpts from the unreleased third album Space Lab were included within a 2012 Peaceville reissue of the album.

== Track listing ==
No.	Title	Length
1.	"First Communion. Mode: Direct"	23:10
2.	"To Cold Void Desolation"	11:48
Total length:		34:58

== Personnel ==
- Fenriz - keyboards, recording, producer, engineering
