= Old Star =

Studio album by Darkthrone
- Released: 31 May 2019
- Recorded: October – 24 November 2018
- Studio: Necrohell II Studios
- Genre: Black metal; doom metal; heavy metal
- Length: 38:10
- Label: Peaceville
- Producer: Nocturno Culto

Darkthrone chronology
Arctic Thunder (2016)	Old Star (2019)	Eternal Hails...... (2021)

Old Star is the 17th studio album by the Norwegian black metal band Darkthrone, released on 31 May 2019, by Peaceville Records. The album represented another drastic musical shift for the band, now featuring a doom metal style in the vein of Candlemass, combined with the band's more recent "blackened heavy metal" sound.

== Track listing ==
All lyrics are written by Fenriz

No.	Title	Music	Length
1.	"I Muffle Your Inner Choir"	Nocturno Culto	6:26
2.	"The Hardship of the Scots"	Fenriz	7:36
3.	"Old Star"	Nocturno Culto	4:28
4.	"Alp Man"	Fenriz	5:27
5.	"Duke of Gloat"	Nocturno Culto	6:49
6.	"The Key Is Inside the Wall"	Fenriz	7:24
Total length:			38:10

== Personnel ==
Darkthrone

- Nocturno Culto – vocals, guitar, bass, production
- Fenriz – drums, lyrics

Additional personnel

- Sanford Parker – mixing
- Jack Control – mastering
- Chadwick St. John – cover art

== Charts ==
Chart (2019)	Peak position
Austrian Albums (Ö3 Austria)	23
Belgian Albums (Ultratop Flanders)	110
Belgian Albums (Ultratop Wallonia)	146
Finnish Albums (Suomen virallinen lista)	10
French Albums (SNEP)	171
German Albums (Offizielle Top 100)	27
Norwegian Albums (VG-lista)	18
Scottish Albums (OCC)	24
Swedish Albums (Sverigetopplistan)	43
Swiss Albums (Schweizer Hitparade)	41
