= Høstmørke =

Studio album by Isengard
- Released: 1995
- Genre: Folk metal, black metal
- Length: 32:13
- Label: Moonfog Productions
- Producer: Fenriz

Isengard chronology
Vinterskugge (1994)	Høstmørke (1995)	Vårjevndøgn (2020)

Høstmørke is the Norwegian black metal band Isengard's second album, released in 1995. The title means "autumn darkness" in Norwegian.

== Track listing ==
1. "Neslepaks" (When read backwards it becomes "Skapelsen" which means "The Creation") – 5:32
2. "Landet og Havet" (The Land and the Sea) – 1:07
3. "I Kamp med Hvitekrist" (In Battle With Christ) – 4:57
4. "I ei Gran Borti Nordre Åsen" (In a spruce far into the Northern Ridge) – 3:43
5. "Over de Syngende Øde Moer" (Over the Singing Wastelands) – 5:52
6. "Thornspawn Chalice" – 8:10
7. "Total Death" – 2:50

== Credits ==
- Fenriz – all instruments and vocals

=== Guests ===
- Aldrahn (Dødheimsgard) – spoken vocals on track 1
- Vicotnik (Dødheimsgard) – first scream on track 6

== Reception ==
Peaceville records re-released what it described as a classic album on its label.

A reviewer in Sonic Abuse describes Høstmørke as "a stunning, icy collection of folk, doom, black metal and rock all held together by the charismatic strength of Fenriz’s idiosyncratic voice and the sheer wealth of influences that can be found throughout the disc", and praises Peaceville for the "more than worthy" reissue.
