= Circle the Wagons (album) =

Studio album by Darkthrone
- Released: 5 April 2010
- Recorded: 2008–2009
- Studio: Necrohell II studios
- Genre: Crust punk; heavy metal; speed metal
- Length: 40:50
- Label: Peaceville

Darkthrone chronology
Dark Thrones and Black Flags (2008)	Circle the Wagons (2010)	The Underground Resistance (2013)

Professional ratings
Review scores
Source	Rating
About.com	3.5/5 stars
Blabbermouth	8.5/10 stars
Metal Storm	(7.8/10)

Circle the Wagons is the fourteenth studio album by the Norwegian band Darkthrone. The album was released 5 April 2010 by Peaceville Records. Fenriz, the band's drummer, described the music as Darkthrone's "own brand of heavy metal/speed metal-punk", and declared it a further shift from their old black metal style. About half of the album was written by Fenriz and half by Nocturno Culto.

The catalog number "ANTI-King ov Hell 001" appeared in the liner notes.

== Track listing ==
No.	Title	Composer	Length
1.	"Those Treasures Will Never Befall You"	Fenriz	4:21
2.	"Running for Borders"	Nocturno Culto	4:04
3.	"I Am the Graves of the 80s"	Fenriz	3:07
4.	"Stylized Corpse"	Nocturno Culto	7:33
5.	"Circle the Wagons"	Fenriz	2:46
6.	"Black Mountain Totem"	Fenriz, Nocturno Culto	5:36
7.	"I Am the Working Class"	Fenriz	5:08
8.	"Eyes Burst at Dawn"	Nocturno Culto	3:49
9.	"Bränn inte slottet ("Don't Burn the Castle")"	Fenriz	4:37
Total length:			40:50

== Credits ==
- Nocturno Culto – vocals, electric guitar, bass guitar
- Fenriz – drums, bass guitar, vocals
- Dennis Dread – cover art

== Charts ==
Chart (2010)	Peak position
Norwegian Albums Chart	23
