= Ravishing Grimness =

Studio album by Darkthrone
- Released: 29 September 1999
- Recorded: December 1998 – April 1999
- Genre: Black metal
- Length: 37:40
- Label: Moonfog Productions; Peaceville Records (re-release)
- Producer: Darkthrone

Darkthrone chronology
Goatlord (1996)	Ravishing Grimness (1999)	Plaguewielder (2001)

Professional ratings
Review scores
Source	Rating
AllMusic	3.5/5 stars
Collector's Guide to Heavy Metal	7/10
Rock Hard	7.5/10

Ravishing Grimness is the seventh studio album by Norwegian black metal band Darkthrone. It was released 29 September 1999 by Moonfog Productions.

Nocturno Culto wrote the music for all the songs except "The Beast", which was the sole musical contribution by Fenriz, who contributed lyrics instead.

In the album's booklet, Nocturno Culto was credited as "Nocturnal Cult". Also, all the Ts in the liner notes and lyrics were replaced with inverted crosses.

Ravishing Grimness was re-released with new artwork in 2011 by Peaceville Records.

== Track listing ==
All lyrics are written by Fenriz, except where noted; all music is composed by Nocturno Culto, except where noted.

No.	Title	Lyrics	Music	Length
1.	"Lifeless"			5:42
2.	"The Beast"	Aldrahn, Fog	Fenriz	5:30
3.	"The Claws of Time"			7:03
4.	"Across the Vacuum"			7:14
5.	"Ravishing Grimness"			7:26
6.	"To the Death (Under the King)"			4:45
Total length:				37:40

== Personnel ==
Darkthrone

- Nocturno Culto – electric guitar, bass guitar, vocals
- Fenriz – drums

Production

- Nocturno Culto – cover design
- Bernt B. Ottem – cover design
