= The Underground Resistance =

Studio album by Darkthrone
- Released: 25 February 2013
- Recorded: 2010–2012
- Studio: Necrohell II studios
- Genre: Heavy metal; speed metal; thrash metal
- Length: 41:40
- Label: Peaceville

Darkthrone chronology
Circle the Wagons (2010)	The Underground Resistance (2013)	Arctic Thunder (2016)

The Underground Resistance is the 15th studio album by Norwegian black metal band Darkthrone. It was released 25 February 2013 by Peaceville Records.

== Production ==
The album was recorded from spring 2010 through summer 2012 at Necrohell II Studios.

== Style ==
On The Underground Resistance, the band largely abandoned the crust punk elements found on their previous four albums. The music on the album has been described as "classic metal" incorporating '80s speed metal, thrash metal, black metal, doom metal and "a dose of punk". PopMatters critic Dean Brown called it "a lengthy jaunt which touches upon the grandiose vocal gymnastics of King Diamond galloping upon hellbound '80s-inspired thrash metal riffs, before descending into the Crypts of Rays with a spiteful Celtic Frost groove". Kyle Ward of Sputnikmusic described it as Darkthrone's "most 'metal' album", while James Zalucky of Metal Injection wrote, "If I had to give you an example of 'true metal', it would be Darkthrone's The Underground Resistance".

== Critical reception ==
Professional ratings
Review scores
Source	Rating
About.com	4.5/5 stars
Decibel	7/10 stars
Pitchfork	7.4/10
PopMatters	8/10 stars
Sputnikmusic	4.2/5

The album received positive reviews, with reviewers noting how much "fun" Fenriz and Nocturno Culto appeared to have as they continued to pay homage to classic metal bands. Both Pitchfork and PopMatters observed that the album possessed a youthful energy that belied the age of the band members. About.com noted that the album continued to move the band away from the crust punk influence most strongly heard on The Cult Is Alive and towards NWOBHM and power metal as driving influences.

== Track listing ==
No.	Title	Composer	Length
1.	"Dead Early"	Nocturno Culto	4:49
2.	"Valkyrie"	Fenriz	5:14
3.	"Lesser Men"	Nocturno Culto	4:55
4.	"The Ones You Left Behind"	Fenriz	4:16
5.	"Come Warfare, the Entire Doom"	Nocturno Culto	8:37
6.	"Leave No Cross Unturned"	Fenriz	13:49

== Personnel ==
- Nocturno Culto – vocals, electric guitar, bass guitar
- Fenriz – drums, vocals, electric guitar on track 2, bass guitar on track 4
- Recorded and mixed by Nocturno Culto
- Mastered by Jack Control at Enormous Door, USA
- Cover artwork by Jim Fitzpatrick

== Charts ==
Chart (2013)	Peak position
Belgian Albums (Ultratop Flanders)	199
Finnish Albums (Suomen virallinen lista)	35
Norwegian Albums (VG-lista)	23
Swedish Albums (Sverigetopplistan)	50
