= Sardonic Wrath =

Studio album by Darkthrone
- Released: 6 September 2004
- Recorded: 2004
- Genre: Black metal
- Length: 34:22
- Label: Moonfog Productions
- Producer: Darkthrone

Darkthrone chronology
Hate Them (2003)	Sardonic Wrath (2004)	The Cult Is Alive (2006)

Professional ratings
Review scores
Source	Rating
AllMusic	link
Terrorizer	8.5/10

Sardonic Wrath is the 10th studio album by the Norwegian black metal band Darkthrone. It was released 6 September 2004 by Moonfog Productions, and was the band's last album on that record label. It was also Darkthrone's last album recorded solely in the black metal style, with subsequent albums featuring stronger punk traits. However, Einar Sjursø observed in Terrorizer that "even if there is a certain punk attitude to the odd riff here and there" it is a case of "the diabolic duo [Fenriz and Nocturno Culto]...simply drawing more influences into the Darkthrone melting pot, turning them into crystalline Darkthrone riffs".

The entire album was leaked on the Internet beginning in April 2004, long before the September 2004 release date.

On the song "Hate Is the Law", vocals were performed by Fenriz and Apollyon.

This album is dedicated to the memory of Quorthon from Bathory.

The album was reissued by Peaceville Records in 2014. The reissue contained a bonus disc of commentary from Fenriz and Nocturno Culto.

== Track listing ==
All lyrics are written by Fenriz, except where noted

No.	Title	Music	Length
1.	"Order of the Ominous" (instrumental)	Fenriz	2:32
2.	"Information Wants to Be Syndicated"	Nocturno Culto	3:44
3.	"Sjakk matt Jesu Krist" ("Checkmate Jesus Christ")	Fenriz	4:04
4.	"Straightening Sharks in Heaven"	Nocturno Culto	3:27
5.	"Alle gegen alle" ("All Against All")	Fenriz	3:21
6.	"Man tenker sitt" ("You Have Your Thoughts")	Nocturno Culto	3:05
7.	"Sacrificing to the God of Doubt"	Nocturno Culto	4:34
8.	"Hate Is the Law"	Fenriz	3:22
9.	"Rawness Obsolete"	Fenriz, Nocturno Culto	6:14
Total length:			34:22

== Personnel ==
- Fenriz – drums, vocals on "Hate Is the Law"
- Nocturno Culto – electric guitar, bass guitar, vocals
- Apollyon – vocals on "Hate Is the Law"
