= Valhall (band) =

Norwegian doom metal band

- Origin: Oslo, Norway
- Genres: Doom metal, black metal (early)
- Years active: 1987–present
- Labels: Housecore Records
- Members: Ronny Sorkness; Kenneth Sorkness; Frank Wanberg; Gylve Fenriz Nagell; Kristian Valbo
- Past members: Lars Brede Jensen; Kenth Robin Olsen; Thomas Berglie; Erik Lancelot; K. J. Lervåg; Geir Kolden; Frode Malm

Valhall is a Norwegian doom metal band. The band is noted for having briefly had former Ulver drummer Erik Lancelot in their ranks, and for having Fenriz (of Darkthrone) as their main drummer.

== Discography ==
=== Studio albums ===
- 1995 – Moonstoned (Head Not Found)
- 1997 – Heading for Mars (Head Not Found)
- 2009 – Red Planet (Housecore Records)

=== Demos ===
- 1988 – Castle of Death
- 1989 – Amalgamation
- 1990 – Trauma
- 1991 - Live
- 1991 – Pagan Token
