= Plaguewielder =

Studio album by Darkthrone
- Released: 10 September 2001
- Recorded: June 2001 at Studio Studio Nyhagen (Toten, Norway)
- Genre: Black metal
- Length: 42:50
- Label: Moonfog Productions; Peaceville Records (re-release)
- Producer: Darkthrone

Darkthrone chronology
Ravishing Grimness (1999)	Plaguewielder (2001)	Hate Them (2003)

Professional ratings
Review scores
Source	Rating
AllMusic	link
Metal Storm	8.4/10

Plaguewielder is the eighth studio album by Norwegian black metal band Darkthrone. It was released 10 September 2001 by Moonfog Productions.

The album was reissued with new artwork in 2011 by Peaceville Records. The CD edition included a second disc of commentary from the band members.

== Track listing ==
- All music written by Nocturno Culto, except where noted.
- All lyrics by Fenriz.

No.	Title	Length
1.	"Weakling Avenger"	7:55
2.	"Raining Murder"	5:14
3.	"Sin Origin" (Fenriz, Nocturno Culto)	6:45
4.	"Command"	8:02
5.	"I, Voidhanger"	5:38
6.	"Wreak"	9:16

== Personnel ==
- Nocturno Culto – electric guitar, bass guitar, vocals
- Fenriz – drums
- Apollyon and Sverre Dæhli – backing vocals on "Command"

Production

- Arranged and produced by Darkthrone.
- Recorded and engineered by Dag Stokke at Studio Studio Nyhagen
