= Total Death =

Studio album by Darkthrone
- Released: 15 January 1996
- Recorded: August and October 1995
- Studio: Ancient Specter Ruins, Skoklefald, Nesodden, Norway
- Genre: Black metal
- Length: 35:47
- Label: Moonfog Productions
- Producer: Nocturno Culto

Darkthrone chronology
Panzerfaust (1995)	Total Death (1996)	Goatlord (1996)

Professional ratings
Review scores
Source	Rating
Chronicles of Chaos	6/10
Collector's Guide to Heavy Metal	7/10

Total Death is the sixth studio album by Norwegian black metal band Darkthrone. It was recorded in August and October 1995 at Ancient Specter Ruins and released in 1996 by Moonfog Productions.

All of the album's lyrics were written either by members of other black metal bands or Nocturno Culto (unlike the band's usual method on other Darkthrone albums, in which Fenriz was the main lyricist).

The album was released on CD and LP; the vinyl edition featured different cover art. In March 2011, Total Death was reissued by Peaceville Records with an extra track and an extra CD of commentary by the band members. The extra track was recorded around the same time as the album and previously appeared on a Moonfog compilation.

== Track listing ==
Music and lyrics written by Nocturno Culto unless noted otherwise.

No.	Title	Lyrics	Music	Length
1.	"Earth's Last Picture"	Garm	Fenriz	5:12
2.	"Blackwinged"			4:31
3.	"Gather for Attack on the Pearly Gates"			4:53
4.	"Black Victory of Death"	Ihsahn	Fenriz	4:00
5.	"Majestic Desolate Eye"			3:07
6.	"Blasphemer"	Carl-Michael Eide	Fenriz	4:01
7.	"Ravnajuv"			4:20
8.	"The Serpents Harvest"	Satyr	Fenriz	5:43

== Credits ==
Darkthrone

- Fenriz – drums, bass guitar on tracks 1, 4, 6 and 8
- Nocturno Culto – vocals, electric guitar, bass guitar on tracks 2, 3, 5 and 7, producer

Production

- P.A. Roald – engineer
