= Dark Thrones and Black Flags =

Studio album by Darkthrone
- Released: 20 October 2008
- Recorded: October 2007 – July 2008
- Studio: Necrohell II studio
- Genre: Black metal, crust punk
- Length: 38:57
- Label: Peaceville
- Producer: Nocturno Culto

Darkthrone chronology
F.O.A.D. (2007)	Dark Thrones and Black Flags (2008)	Circle the Wagons (2010)

Dark Thrones and Black Flags is the 13th studio album by the Norwegian band Darkthrone. It was released 20 October 2008 by Peaceville Records. The music largely followed in the style of their previous album, F.O.A.D. Half of the lyrics and music were written by Nocturno Culto, while the other half were written by Fenriz.

== Track listing ==
No.	Title	Lyrics	Music	Length
1.	"The Winds They Called the Dungeon Shaker"	Fenriz	Fenriz	3:52
2.	"Death of All Oaths (Oath Minus)"	Nocturno Culto	Nocturno Culto	4:16
3.	"Hiking Metal Punks"	Fenriz	Fenriz	3:21
4.	"Blacksmith of the North (Keep that Ancient Fire)"	Nocturno Culto	Nocturno Culto	3:13
5.	"Norway in September"	Fenriz	Nocturno Culto	5:46
6.	"Grizzly Trade"	Fenriz	Nocturno Culto	4:16
7.	"Hanging Out in Haiger"	Fenriz	Fenriz	3:22
8.	"Dark Thrones and Black Flags"	(Instrumental)	Fenriz	2:24
9.	"Launchpad to Nothingness"	Nocturno Culto	Nocturno Culto	4:31
10.	"Witch Ghetto"	Fenriz	Fenriz	3:56
Total length:				38:57

- All songs published by Vile Music/Imagem Music.

== Personnel ==
Darkthrone

- Fenriz – vocals, guitars, drums
- Nocturno Culto – vocals, guitars, bass

Production

- Recorded, "hardly" produced, engineered and mixed by Nocturno Culto
