= Maja Lunde =

Norwegian author and screenwriter

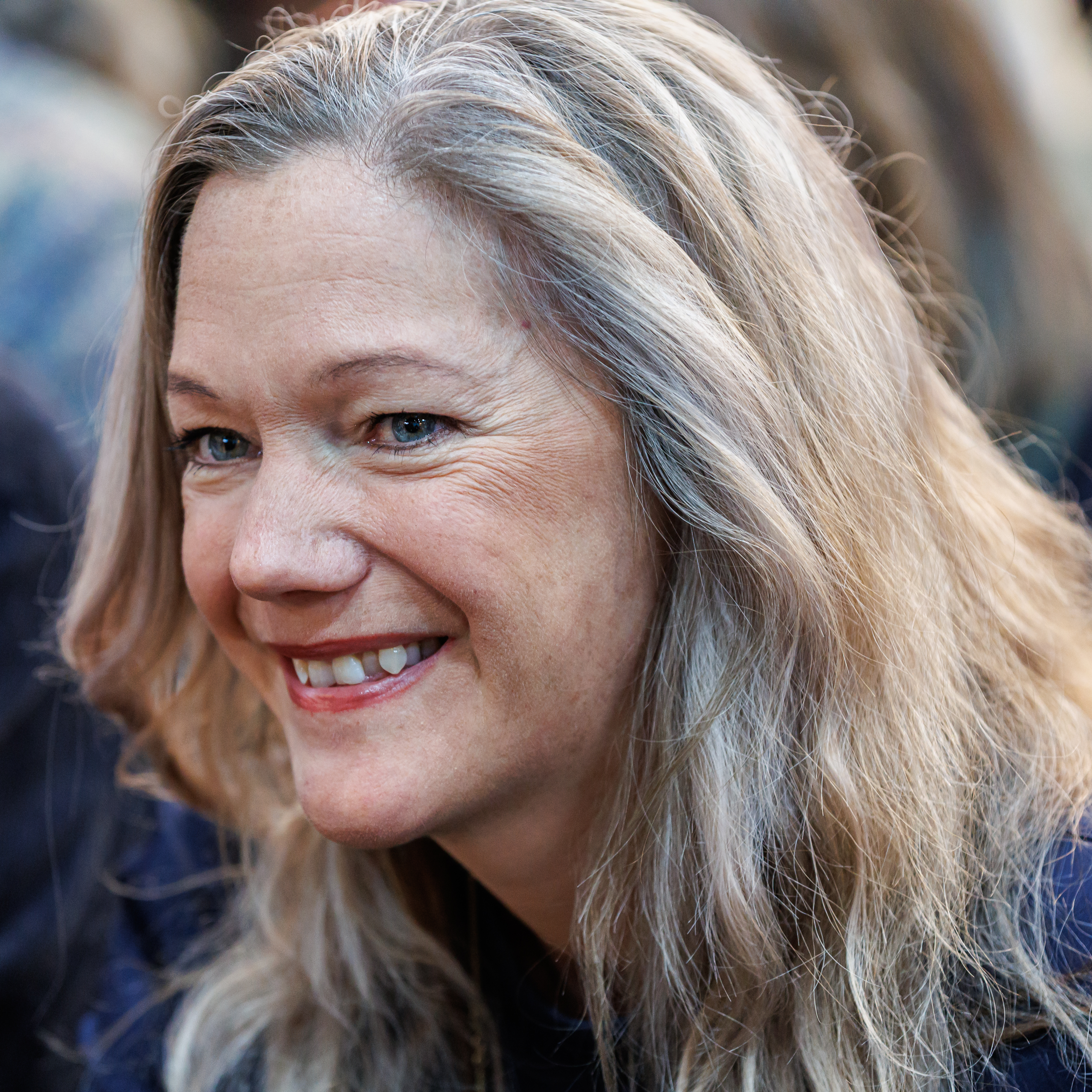
- Lunde in 2025
- Born: 30 July 1975 (age 51); Bislett, Oslo, Norway
- Occupations: Script writer Novelist; Children's writer
- Awards: Norwegian Booksellers' Prize

Maja Lunde (born 30 July 1975) is a Norwegian writer.

== Biography ==
Lunde was born in Oslo on 30 July 1975.

She made her literary debut in 2012 with the children's novel Over grensen ("Across the Border"), a thriller set in 1942, where the protagonists Sarah and Daniel are Jews trying to escape murderous Nazi persecution during the German occupation of Norway and find their way to neutral Sweden. She was awarded the Norwegian Booksellers' Prize in 2015 for the novel Bienes historie, which was published with the title The History of Bees in the United States by Touchstone, a division of Simon and Schuster, in 2017. As script writer she has contributed to the television series Barnas supershow, Hjem and Side om side. She graduated from the University of Oslo.

Her children's book Snøsøsteren from 2018 was illustrated by Lisa Aisato. Her next book was Przevalskis hest (2019), named after Przewalski's horse, the third volume in her series on people and climate. (The first volumes in the series were Bienes historie (2015) and Blå (2017)). A fourth book in the series, Drømmen om et tre, came out in 2022.

In her novel Lukkertid from 2024 the time has "stopped". People stop developing, being born, growing, getting older, or dying. While the rest of the nature goes on as usual, human bodies have stopped developing.
