= Darkthrone Holy Darkthrone =

Studio album by Various artists
- Released: 1998
- Genre: Black metal
- Length: 44:41
- Label: Moonfog

Darkthrone Holy Darkthrone is a tribute album to the Norwegian black metal band Darkthrone, with contributions from other leading Norwegian black metal bands. This album was released in 1998 by Moonfog Productions to mark the band's 10th anniversary.

== Track listing ==
| No. | Title | Artist | Length |
|---|---|---|---|
| 1. | "Kathaarian Life Code" | Satyricon | 9:30 |
| 2. | "Natassja in Eternal Sleep" | Enslaved | 3:20 |
| 3. | "The Pagan Winter" | Thorns | 6:19 |
| 4. | "Cromlech" | Emperor | 4:17 |
| 5. | "Green Cave Float" | Dødheimsgard | 4:19 |
| 6. | "Transilvanian Hunger" | Gehenna | 5:26 |
| 7. | "Slottet i det fjerne" | Gorgoroth | 3:42 |
| 8. | "To Walk the Infernal Fields" (hidden track) | Immortal | 7:48 |
| Total length: | | | 44:41 |

Gorgoroth's line-up on track 7 consists of Infernus and Tormentor.
