= The Climate Quartet =

Book series by Maja Lunde

The Climate Quartet is a series of four books written by Maja Lunde in Norwegian: The History of Bees (2015), The End of the Ocean (2017), The Last Wild Horses (2019), The Dream of a Tree (2022). English-language distribution of the quartet and Lunde's other works is handled by Simon and Schuster.

The first of the quartet was the most widely reviewed, proving popular with readers. It follows the stories of three generations of beekeepers in Norway, using the plight of the insects to describe the effects of climate change. It was translated into English by Diane Oatley.

== See also ==
- Climate fiction
- Norwegian literature
