= Odd Is an Egg =

- Film poster
- Directed by: Kristin Ulseth
- Written by: Maria Avramova, Kristin Ulseth
- Story by: Lisa Aisato
- Produced by: Luís da Matta Almeida, Fredrik Fottland, Kristin Ulseth
- Music by: Fernando Mota, Kåre Christian Vestrheim
- Release date: November 2016 (Fredrikstad Animation Festival)
- Running time: 12 minutes
- Countries: Norway; Portugal

Odd Is an Egg is a 2016 animated, short film directed by Kristin Ulseth and written by Maria Avramova and Kristen Ulseth. The Film is based on a book of the same name by Lisa Aisato.

== Awards ==
Year	Presenter/Festival	Award/Category	Status
2017	Berlin International Film Festival	Berlinale Generation Kplus	Nominated
2017	Tribeca Film Festival	Best Animated Short	Won
2017	Edmonton International Film Festival	Best Animated Short	Nominated
