= Caravans to Empire Algol =

Studio album by Neptune Towers
- Released: 1994
- Recorded: February–March 1994
- Genres: Dark ambient; space ambient
- Length: 37:13
- Label: Moonfog
- Producer: Fenriz

Neptune Towers chronology
Caravans to Empire Algol (1994)	Transmissions from Empire Algol (1995)

Caravans to Empire Algol is the debut studio album by the Norwegian ambient music project Neptune Towers. It was released on December 12, 1994 by Moonfog Productions. Sole band member Fenriz considered this to be the first of the two chapters of the Empire Algol saga, the second (and final) being the next Neptune Towers album, Transmissions from Empire Algol.

== Track listing ==
- All tracks written and arranged by Fenriz.

No.	Title	Length
1.	"Caravans to Empire Algol"	24:34
2.	"The Arrival at Empire Algol"	12:39
Total length:		37:13

== Personnel ==
- Fenriz - keyboards, producer, recording, engineering
