= Soulside Journey =

Studio album by Darkthrone
- Released: 14 January 1991
- Recorded: September 1990
- Studio: Sunlight Studio, Stockholm, Sweden
- Genre: Death metal
- Length: 41:44
- Label: Peaceville
- Producer: Tomas Skogsberg; Darkthrone, with guitars co-produced by Uffe Cederlund

Darkthrone chronology
Soulside Journey (1991)	A Blaze in the Northern Sky (1992)

Professional ratings
Review scores
Source	Rating
AllMusic	3/5 stars
Collector's Guide to Heavy Metal	5/10
Rock Hard	8.5/10

Soulside Journey is the debut album by Norwegian black metal band Darkthrone. It was released in 14 January 1991 by Peaceville Records. It is notable as the band's only death metal album, before they became an integral part of the Norwegian black metal scene.

== Background ==
The band's drummer, Fenriz, used the nickname "Hank Amarillo". Being that they had finally made it "big" and released an album, and due to his negativity toward the then-crop of death metal bands, Fenriz thought it would be appropriate to mockingly choose a "Western" name. Later pressings of the albums listed all of the band's pseudonyms rather than their real names.

== Reissue ==
The album was remastered and reissued by Peaceville in 2003, as well as being repackaged in a cardboard digipak. The first chapter of a four-part video interview with Fenriz and Nocturno Culto, spanning the first four albums, was also included as bonus material.

== Track listing ==
All lyrics are written by Fenriz; all music is composed by Darkthrone.

No.	Title	Length
1.	"Cromlech"	4:11
2.	"Sunrise over Locus Mortis"	3:30
3.	"Soulside Journey"	4:36
4.	"Accumulation of Generalization"	3:17
5.	"Neptune Towers"	3:15
6.	"Sempiternal Sepulchrality"	3:32
7.	"Grave with a View"	3:27
8.	"Iconoclasm Sweeps Cappadocia"	4:00
9.	"Nor the Silent Whispers"	3:18
10.	"The Watchtower"	4:58
11.	"Eon"	3:39
Total length:		41:44

== Credits ==
=== Darkthrone ===
- Nocturno Culto – vocals, lead guitar
- Zephyrous – rhythm guitar
- Dag Nilsen – bass guitar
- Fenriz – drums

=== Other staff ===
- Nimbus – mastering
- Tomas Skogsberg – producer
- Gylve Nagell – photography, design, logo
- Duncan Fegredo – cover art
