= Goatlord (album) =

Demo album by Darkthrone
- Released: 24 October 1996
- Recorded: Norway; 1991 (instruments); 1994 (vocals)
- Genres: Blackened death metal; death-doom
- Length: 37:50
- Label: Moonfog
- Producer: Darkthrone

Darkthrone chronology
Total Death (1996)	Goatlord (1996)	Ravishing Grimness (1999)

Professional ratings
Review scores
Source	Rating
Collector's Guide to Heavy Metal	4/10

Goatlord is a demo album by Norwegian black metal band Darkthrone, released in 1996. It was re-released by Peaceville Records in 2011, with a bonus track and new artwork approved by the band and a second disc containing commentary from Fenriz and Nocturno Culto.

== Background ==
Goatlord was written in 1990 as the follow-up to Darkthrone's death metal debut album, Soulside Journey, and was recorded in late 1990 and early 1991 as an instrumental rehearsal tape. The album was scrapped when the band changed style from death metal to black metal in favor of A Blaze in the Northern Sky. Most of the lyrics for Goatlord were written in the autumn of 1990, with some additions in 1994 for the last two songs. The vocals were recorded in 1994 by Fenriz. The female-sounding vocals were also recorded by him, partly using pitch shifting. Satyr of the band Satyricon is credited for the opening screams in "Rex" and "Sadomasochistic Rites".

After Peaceville Records acquired the Moonfog catalog of the band in 2010 Nocturno Culto called for a cover artwork competition for the 2011 reissue of the album: "There are two albums that will have entirely new cover artwork: 'Ravishing Grimness' and 'Goatlord'. This is a decision that is made by Fenriz and myself. And the idea now is that we are making a competition out of this. If you now feel the urge to contribute to this competition, you are most welcome to send in your art to Peaceville. Only serious contributions will reach Fenriz and me to decide upon. Thank you in advance, we're looking forward to this."

The original 1991 instrumental rehearsal recording was remastered as Goatlord: Original, and scheduled for release with new cover art by Peaceville Records in February 2023. This reissue of the album featured alternate song titles from previous releases, as well as an instrumental version of the track "A Blaze in the Northern Sky".

== Track listing ==
No.	Title	Length
1.	"Rex"	3:48
2.	"Pure Demoniac Blessing"	2:35
3.	"(The) Grimness of Which Shepherds Mourn"	4:23
4.	"Sadomasochistic Rites"	4:04
5.	"As Desertshadows"	4:42
6.	"In His Lovely Kingdom"	3:24
7.	"Black Daimon"	3:50
8.	"Toward(s) the Thornfields"	3:37
9.	"(Birth of Evil) Virgin Sin"	3:25
10.	"Green Cave Float"	4:02

== Personnel ==
- Fenriz – lead vocals, drums
- Nocturno Culto – lead guitar
- Dag Nilsen – bass guitar
- Zephyrous – rhythm guitar
- Satyr – backing vocals
