= F.O.A.D. =

Studio album by Darkthrone
- Released: 25 September 2007
- Recorded: February 2006 – May 2007 at five studio sessions
- Genre: Crust punk; black metal
- Length: 40:23
- Label: Peaceville
- Producer: Darkthrone

Darkthrone chronology
The Cult Is Alive (2006)	F.O.A.D. (2007)	Dark Thrones and Black Flags (2008)

F.O.A.D. (an initialism for "Fuck Off and Die") is the 12th studio album by the Norwegian band Darkthrone. It was released 25 September 2007 by Peaceville Records.

== Track listing ==
No.	Title	Lyrics	Music	Length
1.	"These Shores Are Damned"	Nocturno Culto	Nocturno Culto	5:04
2.	"Canadian Metal"	Fenriz	Fenriz	4:44
3.	"The Church of Real Metal"	Fenriz	Fenriz	4:36
4.	"The Banners of Old"	Nocturno Culto	Nocturno Culto	4:40
5.	"Fuck Off and Die"	Fenriz	Fenriz	3:52
6.	"Splitkein Fever"	Fenriz	Nocturno Culto	4:45
7.	"Raised on Rock"	Fenriz	Fenriz	3:27
8.	"Pervertor of the 7 Gates"	Fenriz	Fenriz	4:25
9.	"Wisdom of the Dead"	Fenriz	Nocturno Culto	4:43
Total length:				40:23

== Personnel ==
- Nocturno Culto – guitar, bass guitar, vocals
- Fenriz – drums, vocals on "Canadian Metal", "Fuck Off and Die", "Raised on Rock", and "Pervertor of the 7 Gates"
- Czral – guitar solo on "Church of Real Metal", backing vocals on "Wisdom of the Dead"
