= Storm (Norwegian band) =

Norwegian metal band

- Origin: Oslo, Norway
- Genres: Folk metal, viking metal
- Years active: 1993–1995
- Label: Moonfog
- Past members: Herr Nagell; S. Wongraven; Kari Rueslåtten

Storm was a Norwegian viking metal band that originally included Fenriz of Darkthrone and Satyr of Satyricon. Later on, Kari Rueslåtten, formerly of the band The 3rd and the Mortal, also joined them on vocals. The project only released one album, titled Nordavind, released in 1995, which makes them among the first viking and folk metal bands.

== History ==
=== Split ===
After the recording of the one and only album, Kari Rueslåtten stated in the Norwegian music newspaper Puls that she would join the band if there were no extreme lyrics in the songs. But then she felt betrayed by Satyr and Fenriz, because Satyr wrote a new end to the song "Oppi fjellet," which contained strongly anti-Christian lyrics. According to Kari:

I reacted very strongly when I heard that they had changed the lyric, but I wasn't strong enough to say no. Now I want that people shall forget this. I feel totally crushed, and I feel that I have lost everything but people must accept that I have made a mistake. And they have to see me as the person I am, as the artist I am. I don't want to be punished more than I already have been punished through this.

As a reaction to Rueslåtten's publicly aired regrets over her involvement with Storm, Satyr stated in an interview:

...Suddenly when the album was released she told the entire garish music press in Trondheim, meaning two newspapers and some radios that we fooled her into singing. Hahaha, how is that fucking possible? She told the journalists (friends of her I guess) that she did not know anything about the aims with Storm before it was released, and now she had found out that Storm was a project with Norwegian anti-Christian values... If she doesn't stop now I will pray for someone to drop a bomb on the entire city of Trondheim.

Kari Rueslåtten has gone on to have a solo career and Satyr and Fenriz have pursued their other musical projects.

== Band members ==
- Herr Nagell – drums, vocals
- Kari Rueslåtten – vocals
- Sigurd Wongraven – guitars, bass, synthesizer, vocals

== Discography ==
- Nordavind (1995)
