= Moonfog Productions =

- Founded: 1992
- Founder: Sigurd Wongraven; Tormod Opedal
- Defunct: 2017
- Genre: Black metal, metal
- Country of origin: Norway

Moonfog Productions was a Norwegian record label founded by Satyricon frontman Satyr and Tormod Opedal. The label was established unofficially in 1992 and released its first record in 1994. Moonfog Productions specialized in black metal and other genres when these were the musical projects of the artists on its main roster. A significant number of titles from Moonfog were subsequently reissued by Peaceville Records.

== Artists ==
- Darkthrone (from 1995 to 2004)
- Dødheimsgard
- Disiplin
- Eibon
- Gehenna
- Isengard
- Khold
- Neptune Towers
- Satyricon
- Storm
- Thorns
- Wongraven

== Visual style ==
In the 1990s, Moonfog Productions was distinguished by the high quality and uniformity of its record and promotional material design, setting it apart from contemporary black metal releases both in Norway and internationally. Designer Halvor Bodin either designed or contributed to the design of at least one-third of Moonfog's releases.

== List of records ==
- [FOG 001] Satyricon: Dark Medieval Times (1993)
- [FOG 002] Neptune Towers: Caravans to Empire Algol (1994)
- [FOG 003] Satyricon: The Shadowthrone (1994)
- [FOG 004] Storm: Nordavind (1995)
- [FOG 005] Darkthrone: Panzerfaust (1995)
- [FOG 006] Wongraven: Fjelltronen (1996)
- [FOG 007] Isengard: Høstmørke (1995)
- [FOG 008] Neptune Towers: Transmissions from Empire Algol (1995)
- [FOG 009] Satyricon and Enslaved: The Forest Is My Throne / Yggdrasil (1995) (split)
- [FOG 010] Various Artists: Crusade from the North (a compilation of Moonfog artists) (1996)
- [FOG 011] Darkthrone: Total Death (1996)
- [FOG 012] Satyricon: Nemesis Divina (1996)
- [FOG 013] Darkthrone: Goatlord (1996)
- [FOG 014] Satyricon: Megiddo (1997)
- [FOG 015] Gehenna: Deadlights (1998)
- [FOG 016] Gehenna: Adimiron Black (1998)
- [FOG 017] Dødheimsgard: Satanic Art (1998)
- [FOG 018] Various Artists: Darkthrone: Holy Darkthrone Eight Norwegian bands paying tribute (1998)
- [FOG 019] Thorns and Emperor: Thorns vs. Emperor (1999)
- [FOG 020] Dødheimsgard: 666 International (1999)
- [FOG 021] Satyricon: Intermezzo II (1999)
- [FOG 022] Satyricon: Rebel Extravaganza (1999)
- [FOG 023] Darkthrone: Ravishing Grimness (1999)
- [FOG 024] Various Artists: Moonfog 2000 — A Different Perspective (2000)
- [FOG 025] Gehenna: Murder (2000)
- [FOG 026] Thorns: Thorns (2001)
- [FOG 027] Khold: Masterpiss of Pain (2001)
- [FOG 028] Darkthrone: Plaguewielder (2001)
- [FOG 029] Khold: Phantom (2002)
- [FOG 030] Satyricon: Ten Horns – Ten Diadems (2002)
- [FOG 031] Satyricon: Volcano (2002)
- [FOG 032] Darkthrone: Hate Them (2003)
- [FOG 033] Disiplin: Disiplin (2003)
- [FOG 034] Darkthrone: Sardonic Wrath (2004)
- [FOG 035] Disiplin: Anti-Life (2005)
- [FOG 036] Gehenna: WW (2005)
- [FOG 037] Dødheimsgard (as DHG): Supervillain Outcast (2007)
- [FOGVD 001] Satyricon: Mother North (video)
- [FOGVD 002] Satyricon: Roadkill Extravaganza (video)
- [NPR 751, Napalm Records catalogue] Satyricon: Deep Calleth Upon Deep (2017)

== See also ==
- List of record labels
