= Isengard (band) =

Norwegian pagan black metal band

- Origin: Oslo, Norway
- Genres: Death metal, black metal, folk metal
- Years active: 1989–present
- Labels: Moonfog, Deaf, Peaceville
- Past members: Fenriz

Isengard is a solo project of Darkthrone drummer Fenriz, created in 1989.

It is rooted on Norwegian black/Viking metal and experimental rock on some tracks, and named after the fortress Isengard in J. R. R. Tolkien's The Lord of the Rings book series.

== History ==
The figure in Isengard's logo was taken from the Lord of the Rings RPG Middle-earth Role Playing. The original illustration represents Thuringwethil, the vampire from The Silmarillion.

Fenriz created Isengard because he had musical ideas that did not fit in with Darkthrone. Fenriz performed all instruments and vocals. Vinterskugge is a compilation of three demos recorded before the full-length album Høstmørke was recorded.

When asked how he felt about Isengard in a November 2007 interview, Fenriz commented that he does not "understand why people like it so much". He stated that people like "the elements" which he doesn't like, namely the project's folk metal aspect.

In 2016, Peaceville Records issued the two-song 7" Traditional Doom Cult. Its A-side, "The Light", was recorded in 1989, whereas B-side "The Fright" was recorded in the early 1990s.

A third Isengard album, Vårjevndøgn, was released in October 2020, consisting of unreleased recordings from 1989 to 1993.

== Discography ==
- Spectres over Gorgoroth (demo, 1989)
- Horizons (demo, 1991)
- Vandreren (demo, 1993)
- Vinterskugge (compilation, 1994)
- Høstmørke (1995)
- Traditional Doom Cult (2016)
- Vårjevndøgn (2020)
