= Kong (band) =

- Origin: Amsterdam, The Netherlands
- Genres: Progressive metal; industrial metal; psychedelic rock
- Years active: 1988–2000; 2007-present
- Labels: Peaceville, Music for Nations, Roadrunner, Kongenial
- Members: Mark Drillich; Tijs Keverkamp; David Kox; Oscar Alblas
- Website: kong.nl

Kong is a Dutch, Amsterdam-based band, known for creating an avant-garde mix of rock, electronica, and industrial. Nearly all of Kong's music is instrumental, with the only vocals being an eclectic blend of sampling. The band takes a quadrophonic approach to their shows: live performances are played in a quadraphonic setup, with each band member having his/her own independent stage and PA system.

== History ==
=== 1988-2000 ===
Kong was formed in 1988 by guitarist/synth programmer Dirk de Vries, guitarist Aldo Sprenger, bassist/synth programmer Mark Drillich, and drummer Rob Smits. The band released their debut album Mute Poet Vocalizer in 1990 and started touring across Europe. Kong's second album Phlegm was released in 1992 and contains the band's best-known song Stockhouse.

The band released the follow-up to Phlegm, Push Comes To Shove, in 1995. Shortly after the release, founding members Sprenger and Smits left the band and were replaced by guitarist Marieke Verdonk and drummer Rob Snijders. With this lineup, Kong recorded the album Earmined; their first album to be released by Roadrunner Records. Snijders left in 1998, and drumming duties for 1999's Freakcontrol album were split between new drummer Klaas Broekema and former member Rob Smits.

After touring in support of Freakcontrol, the band decided to take an "open-ended sabbatical" and virtually disbanded.

=== 2007-present ===
After a seven-year hiatus, Kong was revived by Drillich, and completed by guitarist Tijs Keverkamp, guitarist/synth operator David Kox, and drummer Mandy Hopman. In 2009 the album What It Seems Is What You Get was released by the band's own label Kongenial. Both the album and the subsequent performances were well received by fans and critics, prompting the band to start working on more music. This resulted in the album Merchants Of Air, released in 2012. Hopman left Kong in 2013 and was succeeded by Oscar Alblas. On September 19, 2014, Kong released the third album since their revival, entitled Stern. The band played live sporadically over the next couple of years, including an appearance at the ProgPower Europe festival in 2019. An EP with rerecorded songs off of 1992s Phlegm was released in 2020, titled Phlegmatism

== Quadraphonic live setup ==
The idea for Kong's quadraphonical live setup originated at one of the band’s very first gigs. On the opening night of an art exhibition in a squatted Amsterdam bathhouse there was too little space for the band to play together, so each band member stood in a different corner of the room, with his own stage and PA system. It proved an interesting setup for the band and created a strange experience for the audience. They followed the same approach for their next gig at Melkweg in Amsterdam, and gradually the four-stage setup became one of the band's most recognizable characteristics.

== Other information ==
- Kong's albums from the 1990s and early 2000s have long been out of print, but are available digitally from the band's Bandcamp page.
- Bassist and founding member Mark Drillich also composes music for dance performances, and, as a graphic designer, has created the artwork for most of Kong's albums.
- Kong are not to be confused with the Manchester-based noise rock band of the same name.

== Discography ==
=== Studio albums ===
- Mute Poet Vocalizer (1990)
- Phlegm (1992)
- Push Comes to Shove (1995)
- Earmined (1997)
- Freakcontrol (1999)
- What It Seems Is What You Get (2009)
- Merchants Of Air (2012)
- Stern (2014)
- Traders of Truth (2023)

=== EPs / Singles ===
- Konjunction (1993)
- Ditch / Herk (1995)
- Phlegmatism (2020)

=== Live albums ===
- Live At FZW (2012)

=== Compilations ===
- Remixes 93-99 (2001)
- Outtakes & Rarities 88-97 (2001)
- 88-95 (2003)
