= Ivar Enger =

Norwegian guitarist

- Also known as: Zephyrous
- Born: 30 June 1973 (age 53); Kolbotn, Norway
- Genres: Black metal, death metal
- Occupation: Guitarist
- Formerly of: Darkthrone

Ivar Enger (born 30 June 1973), also known as "Zephyrous", is a Norwegian guitarist who played for black metal band Darkthrone. Very little information is known about him, as Darkthrone have always maintained privacy about themselves, let alone past members.

== Career ==
Enger is credited on Darkthrone's first three albums, Soulside Journey (1991), A Blaze in the Northern Sky (1992) and Under a Funeral Moon (1993), as well as the demo album Goatlord.

There is a theory that he left due to shifting his focus towards following misanthropy, as opposed to leaving due to the switch from death metal to black metal between Soulside Journey and A Blaze in the Northern Sky like other former member Dag Nilsen did. The band maintains that Zephyrous went into a forest and never returned. However, in a 2006 interview with German website Voices from the Dark Side, Nocturno Culto said he still has contact with Zephyrous and would like him to join the band as a guest on a few songs at some point.

In two interviews in 2001 and 2002 with Nocturno Culto, he stated that Zephyrous left Darkthrone partly because he felt "left out" by Nocturno Culto and Fenriz, who were very close at the time, and partly because he was an alcoholic and had a black out while driving his car. "He woke up in the hospital with much strings attached to him". "He left Darkthrone in much anger".

== Discography ==
Darkthrone

- Soulside Journey (1991)
- A Blaze in the Northern Sky (1992)
- Under a Funeral Moon (1993)
