= Asgaroth =

Spanish black metal band

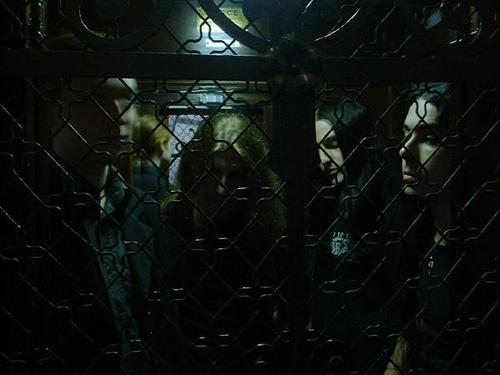
- Asgaroth in 2003

Background information
- Origin: Spain
- Genre: Black metal
- Years active: 1995–2007
- Label: Peaceville
- Members: Mythral; Mr. Ax; Lord Lupus; Joona Etelämäki
- Past members: J. Muriana; Katu-Marus; Julkarn; J. Arckanus; T. Zarach; Oisin Martinez
- Website: www.asgaroth.com

Asgaroth was a Spanish black metal band formed in Barcelona in 1995. It started as a one man-project by Lord Lupus. Their international attention increased after their second album release, Red Shift, through Peaceville.

== Peaceville Records ==
After working with Hell Awaits and Abstract Emotions, the band sent copies of their Red Shift album to different record labels, including Peaceville Records.

The British label signed the band for three editions. After the first 1,000 copies were sold, they released a second edition.

For the summer of 2003, the band planned to make a new record, but the release dates for My Dying Bride and Katatonia new albums, scheduled for June of that year, caused a delay, so the label gave the band more time to prepare another release. During that time, the band performed live in shows and festivals with bands such as Cradle Of Filth.

== Split-up ==
The official split-up occurred in 2007 after their tour with Type O Negative, when the band posted on their Myspace page a blog entry titled "Farewell Asgaroth", in which they stated their decision to break up.

After the split-up, the band posted two first stage pre-studio demos on their MySpace to anticipate the unreleased upcoming album of the band.

== Members ==
=== Band members ===
- Mythral (Christopher Baque-Wildman)
  - Lead & Backing Vocals
  - Lead guitar
  - Keyboard
- Mr. Ax (Oscar David Raventos)
  - Rhythm guitar
  - Samplers
- Lord Lupus (Daniel Rubi Piero)
  - Bass
  - Lead Vocals 1995-1998
  - Backing Vocals
- Joona Etelämäki
  - Drums

=== Former members ===
- J. Muriana
  - Drums (Session) (1995)
- Katu-Marus
  - Drums (1996–1998)
- Julkarn
  - Guitar (1998–1999)
- J. Arckanus
  - Drums (1998–2000)
- T. Zarach
  - Guitar (1998–2001)
- Oisin Martinez
  - Drums (2001–2004)

== Discography ==
- Songs Of War - Demo (1995)
1. "Revenge"
2. "I Summon The Dark Spirit"
3. "Songs Of War"
4. "Raise The Magic Power"
- The Quest For Eldenhor - EP (1996)
1. "Legends Of The Great Magic War" - 4:42
2. "The Freezing Winds Of Kiljaarn" - 6:07
3. "The Last Battle (Tower Of Doom)" - 5:56
4. "Soul Screams" - 2:40
5. "The Return Of The Hero" - 1:08
- Trapped In The Depths Of Eve... - Album (1997)
1. "Cry The Way We Greet Our Fates" - 1:25
2. "Victorious Men Of Earth" - 7:17
3. "Omens (Presagios)" 5:50
4. "A Call In The Winds..." - 2:30
5. "The Dark Force" - 7:24
6. "Last Battle (Tower Of Doom)" - 6:06
7. "Lost In Natura" - 3:58
8. "The Choirs Of The Elemental Deities" - 3:53
9. "Prelude In Dusk" - 0:55
10. "Placious Echoes At Darkwoods You Greet... Silvering Moon Between My Shadows" - 6:33
11. "Outroduction" - 3:16
- Absence Spells Beyond... - Album (1999)
1. "Strengthened Are The Stems Of Nasturtium" - 2:21
2. "Sinking Trails Of Wisdom" - 4:46
3. "Absence Spells Beyond..." - 7:44
4. "Epitaph..." (King Crimson cover) - 7:07
5. "Cry The Way We Greet Our Fates" - 1:23
6. "Victorious Men Of Earth" - 7:11
7. "Omens (Presagios)" - 5:48
8. "A Call In The Winds..." - 2:26
9. "The Dark Force" - 7:20
10. "Last Battle (Tower Of Doom)" - 5:59
11. "Lost In Natura" - 3:56
12. "The Choirs Of The Elemental Deities" - 3:52
13. "Prelude In Dusk" - 0:55
14. "Placious Echoes At Darkwoods You Greet... Silvering Moon Between My Shadows" - 6:31
15. "Outroduction" - 3:13
- Red Shift - Album (2002)
1. "Naked Eye" - 4:46
2. "Lured Decoy" - 6:00
3. "Cyphred" - 2:29
4. "Bluntness" - 6:11
5. "Buried" - 6:13
6. "Mindscape" - 3:41
7. "Descent To Dion" - 6:57
8. "I, Befouled" - 5:17
9. "6 Bloodmarks" - 5:04
10. "Sharpedge Solitude" - 5:35
11. "Red Shift" - 5:48

== Videography ==
Year	Title	Time
1999	"Absence Spells Beyond..."	7:44
2002	"Naked Eye"	4:46
