= The Cult Is Alive =

Studio album by Darkthrone
- Released: 27 February 2006
- Recorded: March–July 2005
- Studio: Necrohell II Studios
- Genre: Crust punk, black metal
- Length: 38:52
- Label: Peaceville
- Producer: Darkthrone

Darkthrone chronology
Sardonic Wrath (2004)	The Cult Is Alive (2006)	F.O.A.D. (2007)

Professional ratings
Review scores
Source	Rating
AllMusic	3.5/5 stars
Blabbermouth	8/10 stars

The Cult Is Alive is the 11th studio album by the Norwegian black metal band Darkthrone. It was released 27 February 2006 by Peaceville Records. This album represented a shift in the band's style, as they incorporated more punk and crust punk traits.

== Track listing ==
All lyrics are written by Fenriz.

No.	Title	Music	Length
1.	"The Cult of Goliath"	Nocturno Culto	4:02
2.	"Too Old, Too Cold"	Nocturno Culto	3:04
3.	"Atomic Coming"	Fenriz	4:51
4.	"Graveyard Slut"	Fenriz	4:04
5.	"Underdogs and Overlords"	Nocturno Culto	4:02
6.	"Whisky Funeral"	Nocturno Culto	3:59
7.	"De underjordiske (Ælia Capitolina)" (The Subterraneans (Ælia Capitolina))	Nocturno Culto	3:14
8.	"Tyster på Gud" (Silencing God)	Fenriz	3:09
9.	"Shut Up"	Nocturno Culto	4:46
10.	"Forebyggende krig" (Preemptive War)	Fenriz	3:41

== Credits ==
- Nocturno Culto – electric guitar, bass guitar, vocals
- Fenriz – drums, vocals on "Graveyard Slut", backing vocals on "Forebyggende krig", rhythm guitar on "Tyster på Gud"

== Charts ==
Chart (2006)	Peak position
Norwegian Albums Chart	22
