= Skeletal Remains =

American death metal band

Skeletal Remains are a death metal band from Los Angeles.

== History ==
They toured with Morta Skuld in 2024. In 2026, attendees of the annual 70000 Tons of Metal cruise alleged that the band's frontman had become intoxicated and acted in appropriately towards them. The event's organizers released a statement saying they felt no need to take action after investigating.

== Musical style ==
Decibel said the band's sound represents "the obvious mimicry of Morrisound’s death metal heyday." Speaking of the band's progression across releases, the site said: "This band has essentially become an emulation of their own emulation. [...] Each successive album in their catalog is basically the equivalent of an iOS update."
