= Tape label =

Tape labels are identifiers given to volumes of magnetic tape.

There are two kinds of tape labels. The first is a label applied to the exterior of tape cartridge or reel. The second is data recorded on the tape itself.

== Visual labels ==
Visual labels are human readable.

The labels have evolved to have barcodes that can be read by tape libraries. Reading the barcode label is often much faster than mounting the tape volume and reading the identification information written on the media. To read the bar code, the tape library need only position the volume in front of the bar code reader.

== Magnetic labels ==
Originally, 7- and 9-track data tapes only had human readable labels on them (i.e. as far as the operating system was concerned they were unlabeled). Somebody wishing to use a particular tape would ask the operator to mount that tape; the operator would look at the human readable label, mount it on a tape drive, and then tell the operating system which drive contained the tape of interest. That had some drawbacks: the operator might mount the wrong tape by mistake, or he might type in the wrong identification.

A solution was to record some tape identification information on the tape itself in a standard format. This metadata allowed the operating system to quickly recognize a volume and assign it to the program that wanted to use it. The operating system would be notified when a tape drive came online, so it would try to read the first block of information on the tape. If that was a volume label, then the operating system would know that that tape volume was available for use. This function is called automatic volume recognition (AVR).

Some computer systems used similar labels on other serial media, for example punched card decks and sometimes line printer output.

Many early computer systems used labels in a format unique to that system. IBM/ANSI labels eventually became universally accepted, often as an alternative to system-specific labels.

=== IBM tape labels ===
IBM tape labels with VOL/HDR/EOV/EOF records. IBM tape labels on 9-track tapes use EBCDIC character encoding; 7-track tapes (now obsolete) used BCD encoding.

=== ANSI tape labels ===
ANSI/ISO/ECMA tape labels are similar to IBM tape labels but use the ASCII character set on 9-track tape. When originally defined in the mid-1960s, they used BCD on 7-track tape.

=== Burroughs tape labels ===
The Burroughs MCP running on the B5000 was one of the earliest systems to automatically read tape labels. When designed in 1961 it used a proprietary format coded in BCD (strictly, Burroughs Interchange Code or BIC), but was later able to read standard 7-track ANSI (then styled USASI) labels.

== RFID tags ==
Some tapes (e.g., later versions of Linear Tape-Open and Advanced Intelligent Tape) are using RFID tags. Often these RFID tags include tape metadata such as data locations, number of tape errors encountered, number of times the entire tape was read or written, etc.

== See also ==
- Microsoft Tape Format
