= Tore Linné Eriksen =

Norwegian historian (born 1945)

- Born: 2 May 1945 (age 81); Kolbotn
- Citizenship: Norwegian
- Education: University of Oslo; University of Trondheim
- Scientific career
- Fields: Global history Development studies African history The country Namibia
- Workplaces: Oslo University College

Tore Linné Eriksen (born 2 May 1945) is a Norwegian historian. His fields of study include global history, development studies and African history, especially focusing on Southern Africa.

== Early life and career ==
Linné Eriksen hails from Kolbotn, but enrolled at the Oslo Cathedral School in 1961 to take his secondary education. Attending the same school were later academics and politicians Knut Kjeldstadli, Steinar Stjernø, Helge Rønning and Theo Koritzinsky. Here, Linné Eriksen was among the founders of Operasjon Dagsverk in 1964.

After finishing school, he briefly worked as a teacher in Northern Norway. He was later employed in the publishing house Pax forlag, founded in 1964, and made his literary debut there in 1966. He then enrolled at the University of Oslo, and was chairman of the Norwegian Students' Society in 1968. Among the radical students, Linné Eriksen was preceded and succeeded by two conservatives; Georg Apenes and Halvor Stenstadvold respectively. Originally a member of the Socialist Youth League (SUF), together with some of the later founders of the Workers' Communist Party, Linné Eriksen was excluded in 1969. He later became involved in the Socialist Left Party. In May 2011 he left the Socialist Left Party due to its support for the Norwegian participation in the Libyan war, and its environmental and development policies.

== Academic career ==
Linné Eriksen finally graduated from the University of Trondheim with a cand.philol. degree in 1974. From 1981 he was employed as a researcher at the Norwegian Institute of International Affairs. In 1997 he was hired as associate professor at Oslo University College, being promoted to professor in 2007. He is now retired, but continues his research and writing.

Notable publications include the 1974 book Underutvikling. In 1985 he published both David Livingstone and The Political Economy of Namibia. Den vanskelige bistanden followed in 1987, about development aid. In 1993 he won the Brage Prize for the school textbooks in modern history, Norge og verden fra 1850 til 1940 and Norge og verden etter 1940.

After 2000, his interest has shifted somewhat towards the history of India and China. He has, however, not discontinued his African studies. The 2000 Norway and National Liberation in Southern Africa was followed by a 2002 book on Nelson Mandela, which received a prize from the Norwegian Ministry of Culture. In 2007 he published the book Det første folkemordet i det tjuende århundret: Namibia 1903-1908 on the Herero and Namaqua Genocide, considered the first of many genocides in the 20th century. In 2008 he contributed to Folkemordenes svarte bok, an anthology on genocide.

In addition to the Socialist Left Party, Linné Eriksen has been involved in Nei til EU and the Norwegian Council for Africa, and has been a member of the board of the Development Fund. Linné Eriksen lives at Huseby in Oslo, with his wife Agnete Eriksen.
