= Lisa Aisato =

Norwegian illustrator and author (born 1981)

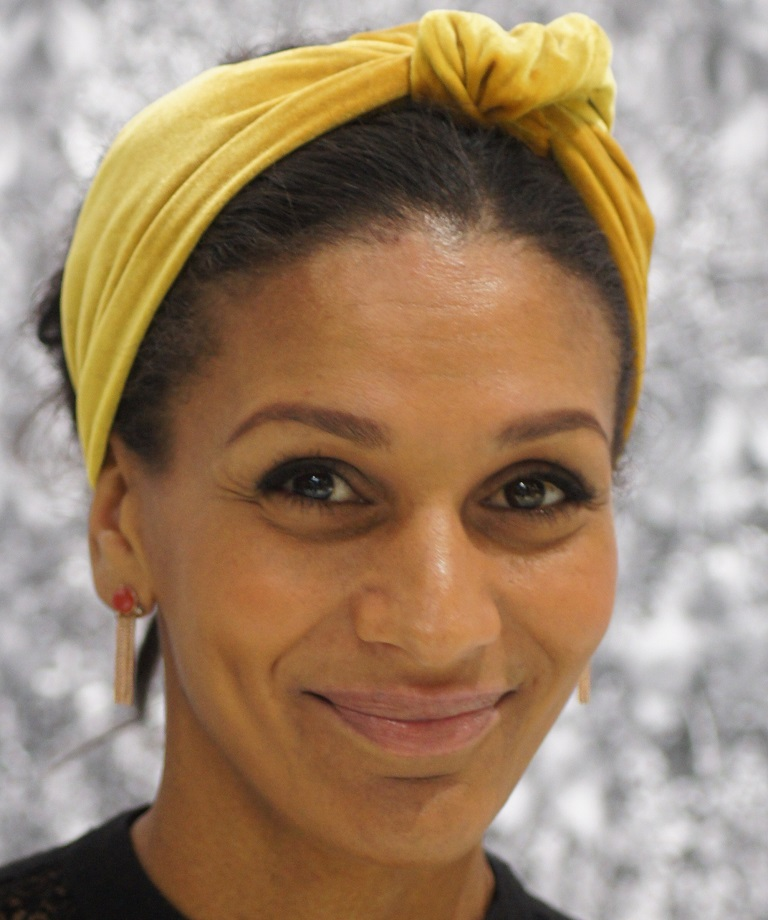
- Born: 23 July 1981 (age 44); Kolbotn, Norway
- Occupations: Visual artist, illustrator and author of picture books
- Relatives: Haddy N'jie (sister)

Lisa Aisato N'jie Solberg, pen name Lisa Aisato (born 23 July 1981), is a Norwegian visual artist, illustrator and author of picture books.

== Personal life ==
Aisato was born in Kolbotn, Norway, to a Norwegian mother and Gambian father. Among her siblings is her sister Haddy N'jie. Aisato resides in Skjærhalden, Hvaler.

== Career ==
Aisato is educated at the art institutions Einar Granum Kunstfagskole and Strykejernet kunstskole. She made her picture book debut in 2008, with Mine to oldemødre. Further books are Odd er et egg from 2010, Fugl from 2013, and En fisk til Luna from 2014. She has illustrated books by others, including Tor Åge Bringsværd, Gaute Heivoll (Svalene under isen from 2012), Maja Lunde (Snøsøsteren from 2018), and Linn Skåber (Til ungdommen from 2018). She regularly contributes with illustrations to the newspaper Dagbladet's supplement Magasinet.

Aisato was awarded Teskjekjerringprisen in 2016, together with her sister and cowriter Haddy N'jie, for the book Snart sover du. Et års god natt.

Her book Odd er et egg was basis for the animated short film Odd is an Egg, directed by Kristin Ulseth, which won a prize for "Best animated short" at the Tribeca Film Festival in 2017. The film was also nominated for prizes at Berlin International Film Festival, and Edmonton International Film Festival.

Her 2019 book Livet – illustrert ("Life – illustrated"), a collection of illustrations supplied with poetic texts, was met with good reviews and sales figures.

== Awards ==
- 2019, Norwegian Booksellers' Prize
