= Fenriz =

Norwegian musician (born 1971)

Gylve Fenris Nagell
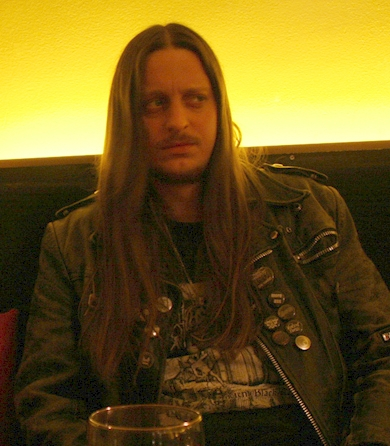
- Fenriz in 2005

Background information
- Also known as: Fenriz
- Born: Leif Nagell; 28 November 1971 (age 54)
- Origin: Kolbotn, Norway
- Genres: Black metal; heavy metal
- Occupations: Musician, songwriter
- Instruments: Drums, guitar, bass, vocals, keyboards, synthesizer
- Years active: 1986–present
- Member of: Darkthrone
- Formerly of: Isengard, Neptune Towers, Valhall, Storm, Dødheimsgard

Gylve Fenris Nagell (born Leif Nagell; 28 November 1971), known professionally as Fenriz, is a Norwegian musician, part-time music journalist and online radio host (with the show "Radio Fenriz") who is best known as one half of the black metal duo Darkthrone, alongside Nocturno Culto. Although primarily a drummer and songwriter, he has also played bass and guitar and performed vocals for Darkthrone and several other metal bands. Fenriz is famed for his encyclopedic knowledge of metal music, his eager promotion of underground bands and the DIY ethic, and his rejection of the "showbiz side of the music industry". Fenriz was also the studio drummer for doom metal band Valhall, and has had several solo projects, including the folk black metal project Isengard and the dark ambient project Neptune Towers.

== Biography ==
Fenriz's first exposure to heavy metal music came when he was a child and received Uriah Heep's album Sweet Freedom from his uncle for his birthday. At age 16, Fenriz dropped out of school and began working full time to support his music. In 1986 he co-founded the death metal band Black Death with Ivar Enger and Anders Risberget. By 1988 they had been joined by Ted Skjellum (Nocturno Culto) and were renamed Darkthrone. After releasing their first death metal album in 1991, the band changed style and became one of the leading bands in the early Norwegian black metal scene. Fenriz said he had a passive interest in Bathory and Celtic Frost, but claims that he did not understand the "darkness" of black metal until hearing a song by the Hungarian band Tormentor. The second album released by Darkthrone, A Blaze in the Northern Sky, recorded in August 1991 at Creative Studios but not released until February 1992, is regarded as one of the most important albums that defined the black metal genre. Darkthrone were not involved in the church burnings and murders carried out by some other members of the scene, and Fenriz has denounced the "hype" surrounding it.

Since 1993, Darkthrone have been a duo of Fenriz and Nocturno Culto. Fenriz recorded all instruments on their albums Transilvanian Hunger (1994) and Panzerfaust (1995). From the late 1980s to the mid-1990s Fenriz also founded several solo projects, including the folk black metal project Isengard and the dark ambient project Neptune Towers. He was also the drummer for the band Valhall on their three studio albums. In the 1990s he co-founded the folk metal band Storm with Sigurd Wongraven, which released one album.

Both he and Nocturno have refused to play live since the 1990s. In 2004, they turned down a nomination for a Norwegian Alarm Award for their album Sardonic Wrath. Fenriz said, "we have no interest in being part of the glitter and showbiz side of the music industry". Fenriz (alongside Varg Vikernes) is the principal focus of the 2008 black metal documentary film Until The Light Takes Us.

In 2016, it was widely reported that Fenriz had been elected to his local municipal council, Oppegård. He was elected for a four-year term as a substitute councillor for the Liberal Party, explaining that he would "have to step in when the usual people who go to the big meetings are sick or something". Fenriz said: "They called and asked if I wanted to be on the list [of backup representatives]. I said yeah, thinking I would be like 18th on the list and I wouldn't really have to do anything". His "campaign" was a photo of him holding his cat with the caption "Please Don't Vote For Me".

Fenriz lives in his hometown of Kolbotn. According to The Guardian, Fenriz "has long been a hero in the underground scene" and "has an obsession with unearthing new music and promoting it with rabid enthusiasm". The heavy metal magazine Iron Fist noted he has a reputation as a "walking metal encyclopedia". He is a part-time music journalist and hosts a monthly online radio show on NTS called "Radio Fenriz". He created the "Band of the Week" blog from which the acts for the underground metal festival Live Evil are sourced. Fenriz has famously been working part-time in the postal service since the late 1980s, which he says allows him to spend many hours each week listening to new music. He has also appeared on a Norwegian television show about hiking in forests.

== Musical projects ==
- Darkthrone — drums, bass, rhythm guitar, vocals, lyrics (1986–present)
- Valhall — drums (1987–1989, 1993–?, 2007–present)
- Fenriz' Red Planet – everything (1993–?) (solo project)
- Isengard — everything (1989–1995) (solo project)
- Neptune Towers – everything (1993–1995) (solo project)
- Dødheimsgard — bass and additional vocals (1994–1995)
- Storm — drums, vocals (1995) (with Satyr from Satyricon and Kari Rueslåtten)
- Eibon — drums (1999) (with Satyr from Satyricon, Killjoy from Necrophagia, and Phil Anselmo from Pantera)
- Fuck You All — bass (2002)
- Regress FF — everything (1994) (solo project)
- Coffin Storm - vocals (2024–present)

== Discography ==
Year	Title	Band	Instruments
1987	Trash Core '87 (demo)	Black Death (pre-Darkthrone)	drums, vocals
1987	Black is Beautiful (demo)	Black Death (pre-Darkthrone)	drums, vocals
1987	Land of Frost (demo)	Darkthrone	drums, vocals
1987	A New Dimension (demo)	Darkthrone	drums
1988	The Castle of Death (demo)	Valhall	drums
1989	Thulcandra (demo)	Darkthrone	drums, vocals
1989	Cromlech (demo)	Darkthrone	drums
1989	Spectres Over Gorgoroth (demo)	Isengard	everything
1991	Horizons (demo)	Isengard	everything
1991	Soulside Journey	Darkthrone	drums
1991	Goatlord (demo)	Darkthrone	drums, vocals
1992	A Blaze in the Northern Sky	Darkthrone	drums
1993	Under a Funeral Moon	Darkthrone	drums
1993	Vanderen (demo)	Isengard	everything
1994	Transilvanian Hunger	Darkthrone	drums, rhythm guitar, bass
1994	Caravans to Empire Algol	Neptune Towers	everything
1994	Promo 1994 (demo)	Dødheimsgard	bass
1995	Høstmørke	Isengard	everything
1995	Transmissions from Empire Algol	Neptune Towers	everything
1995	Panzerfaust	Darkthrone	drums, guitar, bass
1995	Nordavind	Storm	drums, additional vocals
1995	Kronet Til Konge	Dødheimsgard	bass, additional vocals
1995	Moonstoned	Valhall	drums
1995	Promo 1995 (demo)	Dødheimsgard	bass, additional vocals
1996	Total Death	Darkthrone	drums; additional guitar and bass
1997	Heading for Mars	Valhall	drums
1999	Ravishing Grimness	Darkthrone	drums
2001	Plaguewielder	Darkthrone	drums
2003	Hate Them	Darkthrone	drums
2004	Sardonic Wrath	Darkthrone	drums; additional vocals
2006	Too Old, Too Cold (single)	Darkthrone	drums; additional vocals and guitars
2006	The Cult is Alive	Darkthrone	drums; additional vocals and guitars
2006	Forebyggende krig (single)	Darkthrone	drums; additional vocals
2007	NWOBHM (EP)	Darkthrone	drums; additional vocals and guitars
2007	F.O.A.D.	Darkthrone	drums; additional vocals
2008	Dark Thrones and Black Flags	Darkthrone	drums; vocals and guitars (shared)
2009	Red Planet	Valhall	drums
2009	Engangsgrill (split)	Fenriz' Red Planet/Nattefrost	everything (tracks 1–3) (recorded in 1993)
2009	Fuck You All	Fuck You All	bass (recorded in 2002)
2010	Circle the Wagons	Darkthrone	drums; vocals and guitars (shared)
2013	The Underground Resistance	Darkthrone	drums, vocals (shared), guitar solo on track 2, bass on track 4
2015	Regress FF	Regress FF	everything (recorded in 1994)
2016	Arctic Thunder	Darkthrone	drums; additional bass and guitars
2016	Traditional Doom Cult	Isengard	everything (recorded 1989–1990)
2019	Old Star	Darkthrone	Drums
2021	Eternal Hails......	Darkthrone	Drums, bass, synthesizer, additional guitar and vocals
2022	Astral Fortress	Darkthrone	Drums, synthesizer and vocals
2024	It Beckons Us All......	Darkthrone	drums
2024	Arcana Rising	Coffin Storm	vocals

- Note: All Darkthrone lyrics are written by Fenriz, with the exception of Transilvanian Hunger tracks 5–8, Panzerfaust track 6–7 and the Total Death album. Songwriting is usually split between Fenriz and Nocturno Culto, but varies from album to album.

=== Guest appearances ===
- Ulver – vocals on "A Song of Liberty Plates 25–27" from the album Themes from William Blake's The Marriage of Heaven and Hell (1998)
- Satyricon – percussion (tracks 4–5) on Rebel Extravaganza (1999)
- Aura Noir – additional vocals on Dreams like Deserts (1995), Increased Damnation (2000) and The Merciless (2004)
- Thorns – vocals and drums (track 9) on Thorns vs. Emperor (2011) (recorded sometime between 1998 and 1999)
- Red Harvest – backing vocals on "Absolut Dunkel:heit" from the album Cold Dark Matter (2000)
- Cadaver Inc. – additional vocals on Discipline (2001)
- Audiopain – additional lyrics on Revel in Desecration (2002)
- Trashcan Darlings – additional vocals on "Dehumanizer" from the album Episode 1: The Lipstick Menace (2002)
