= Kolbotn =

Coordinates: 59°48′40.3164″N 10°48′0.15″E

- Town
- Location in Akershus
- Country: Norway
- Region: Østlandet
- County: Akershus
- District: Follo
- Municipality: Oppegård

Population
  - Total: c. 6,000
- Time zone: UTC+01:00 (CET)
  - Summer (DST): UTC+02:00 (CEST)
- Post Code: NO-1410

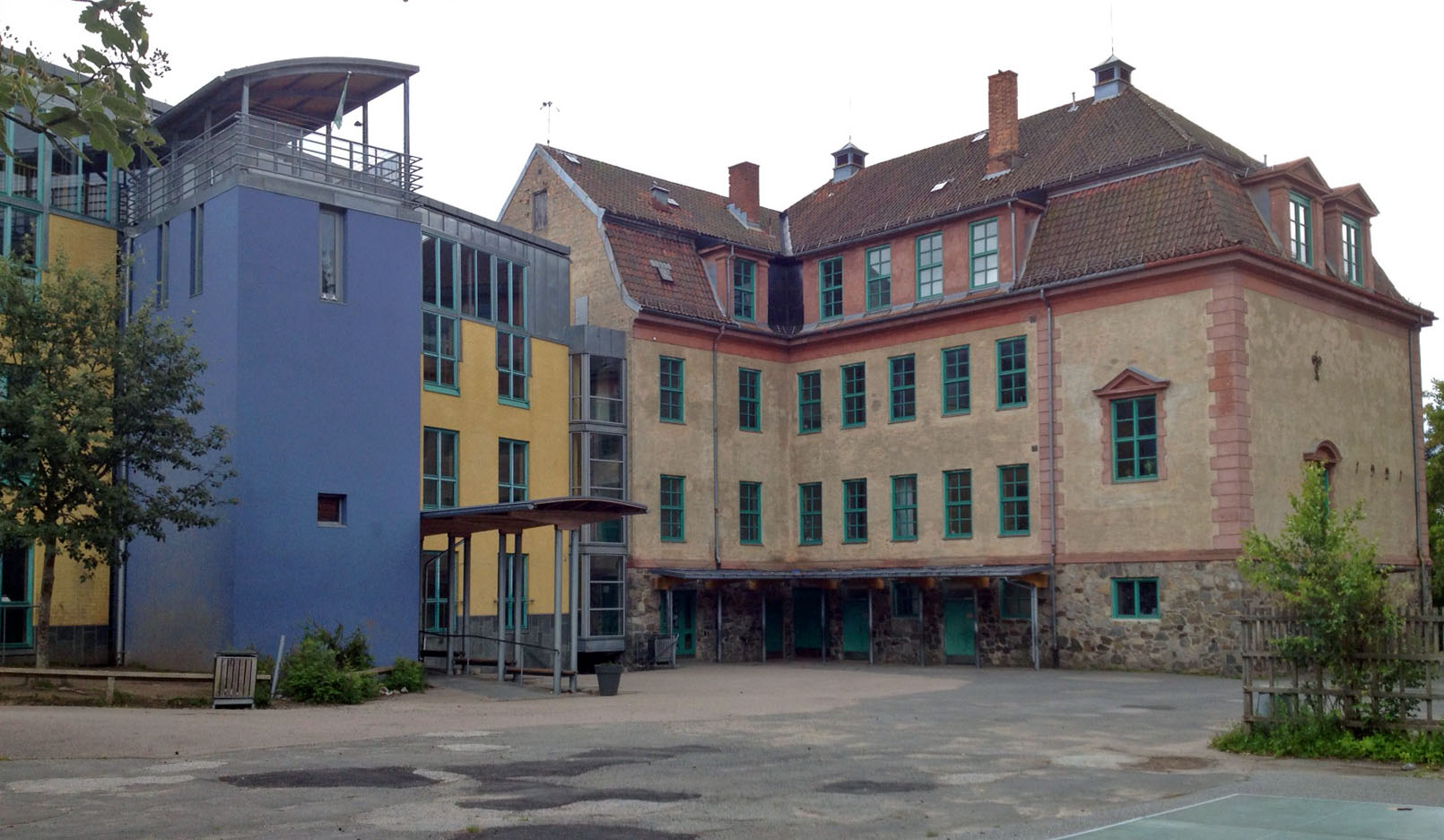
Kolbotn's Primary School

Kolbotn is an urban area in Norway's Nordre Follo municipality in Akershus county. Kolbotn is in the centre of the traditional district Oppegård. The population is about 6,000. Kolbotn has several elementary schools, four middle schools and a high school. The town is located at the end of Kolbotnelva, a river.

Buildings include Stabburet, the area's oldest building, from the 18th century.

== Sports ==
The football team Kolbotn IL hails from here. In 2006 Kolbotn women's team were top of the top league for women in Norway, the Toppserien. The team included Norwegian national footballer Solveig Gulbrandsen. Kolbotn won the 2007 Cup competition by beating Asker 4-2 on 10-11-07. Kolbotn finished in third place in the Toppserien league for three seasons 2009-11 while coached by Dan Eggen. Kolbotn is also the first professional club of Ada Hegerberg, first women's Ballon d'Or in history (2018).

== In popular culture ==
In the Norwegian legal drama Aber Bergen, lead character Erik Aber is "a Kolbotn boy" and implies he is from a rough neighborhood compared to his refined middle class Bergen wife, Elea Wessel.

== People from Kolbotn ==
- Tore Linné Eriksen (born 1945), historian
- Jan Petersen (born 1946 in Oslo, but from Kolbotn), foreign minister
- Eivind Aarset (born 1961), jazz guitarist
- Lisa Aisato (born 1981) illustrator, author of picture books, visual artist
- Eivind Lønning (born 1983), jazz trumpeter
- Fenriz (born 1971), drummer, bass guitarist, guitarist of Darkthrone
- Nocturno Culto (born 1972), singer, bass guitarist, guitarist of Darkthrone
