= Nocturno Culto =

Norwegian heavy metal musician

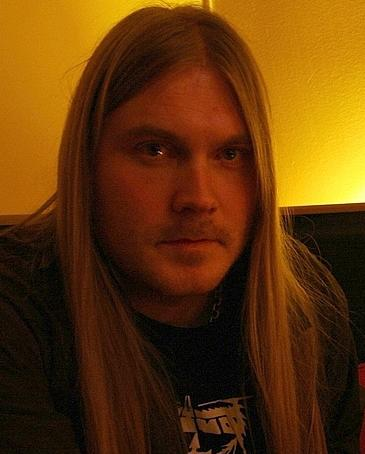
- Nocturno Culto in 2005

Background information
- Also known as: Nocturno Culto; Nocturno; Kveldulv; Nocturnal Cult
- Born: Ted Arvid Skjellum; 4 March 1972 (age 54)
- Origin: Kolbotn, Oppegård, Norway
- Genres: Black metal, heavy metal
- Occupations: Musician, singer, songwriter
- Instruments: Vocals, guitar, bass guitar
- Years active: 1988–present
- Member of: Darkthrone, Gift of Gods
- Formerly of: Sarke, Satyricon

Ted Arvid Skjellum (born 4 March 1972), also known by the stage name Nocturno Culto, is a Norwegian musician best known as the vocalist, lead guitarist, and partial bassist (shared with Fenriz) of the influential black metal band Darkthrone. He has been with the band since 1988. He is also the vocalist of the band Sarke, and has a solo project called Gift of Gods. He currently works in Norway as a school teacher, and has a son and a daughter. He has also released a documentary film called The Misanthrope in which he deals with black metal music and life in Norway.

== Discography ==
Note: All releases are with Darkthrone, unless noted otherwise. This does not include minor guest appearances.

- 1987 – Trash Core '87 (with Black Death)
- 1987 – Black is Beautiful (with Black Death)
- 1988 – Land of Frost
- 1988 – A New Dimension
- 1989 – Thulcandra
- 1989 – Cromlech
- 1991 – Soulside Journey
- 1992 – A Blaze in the Northern Sky
- 1993 – Under a Funeral Moon
- 1994 – Transilvanian Hunger
- 1995 – Panzerfaust
- 1996 – Nemesis Divina (with Satyricon – rhythm guitar)
- 1997 – Goatlord
- 1996 – Total Death
- 1999 – Ravishing Grimness
- 2001 – Plaguewielder
- 2003 – Hate Them
- 2004 – Sardonic Wrath
- 2006 – The Cult Is Alive
- 2007 – F.O.A.D.
- 2008 – Dark Thrones and Black Flags
- 2009 – Vorunah (with Sarke – vocals)
- 2010 – Circle the Wagons
- 2011 – Oldarhian (with Sarke – vocals)
- 2013 – The Underground Resistance
- 2013 – Aruagint (with Sarke – vocals)
- 2013 – Receive (Gift of Gods)
- 2016 – Bogefod (with Sarke – vocals)
- 2016 – Arctic Thunder
- 2017 - Viige Urh (with Sarke - vocals)
- 2019 - Old Star
- 2019 - Gastwerso (with Sarke - vocals)
- 2021 - Eternal Hails......
- 2022 - Astral Fortress
- 2024 - It Beckons Us All.......
- 2026 - Pre-Historic Metal

== Filmography ==
- 2007 – The Misanthrope (documentary)
