= Darkthrone =

Norwegian metal band

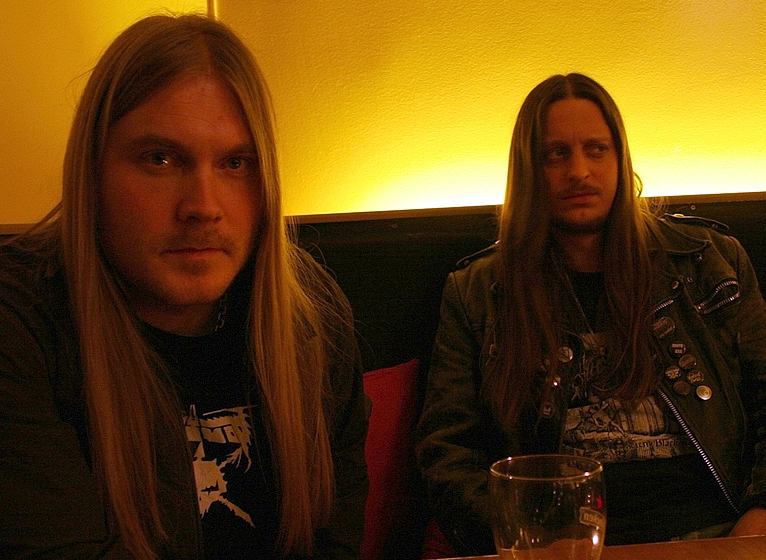
- Nocturno Culto and Fenriz in 2005

Background information
- Origin: Kolbotn, Akershus, Norway
- Genres: Black metal; heavy metal; doom metal; speed metal; death metal (early)
- Years active: 1986–present
- Labels: Peaceville; Moonfog
- Members: Fenriz; Nocturno Culto
- Past members: Zephyrous; Dag Nilsen; Anders Risberget

Darkthrone is a Norwegian black metal band from Kolbotn, Akershus. Formed in 1986 as a death metal band named Black Death, in the early 1990s, Darkthrone switched to a black metal style influenced by Bathory and Celtic Frost, and were a leading band in the Norwegian black metal scene. Darkthrone has been a duo consisting of Fenriz and Nocturno Culto since guitarist Zephyrous left the group in 1993. The band has released 22 studio albums, but do not perform live and have sought to remain outside the mainstream.

The band's debut, Soulside Journey (1991), was their only death metal studio album. Their first three black metal albums, A Blaze in the Northern Sky (1992), Under a Funeral Moon (1993), and Transilvanian Hunger (1994), are often called the "Unholy Trinity". These albums are considered the peak of the band's career and among the most influential black metal recordings.

Beginning with The Cult Is Alive (2006), the band diverged from black metal and shifted to a style more akin to "blackened" crust punk and speed metal. Since The Underground Resistance (2013), the band has incorporated classic heavy metal, doom and thrash, and their style has been described as "blackened heavy metal".

In 2016, the staff of Loudwire named them the 49th-best metal band of all time. In recent years, they collaborated with the National Library of Norway for exhibitions on Norwegian cultural history and black metal.

== History ==
=== Death metal years: 1986–1991 ===
The band that would become Darkthrone formed in late 1986 in Kolbotn, a small town south of Oslo. Known as Black Death, they were a death metal band composed of Gylve Nagell, Ivar Enger, and Anders Risberget. Their inspirations included Autopsy, Venom, Hellhammer, Celtic Frost, Slayer, and Nocturnus. In late 1987, the band renamed to Darkthrone and welcomed Dag Nilsen as a new member. Ted Skjellum joined in the spring of 1988, replacing Risberget. During 1988 and 1989, the band independently released four demo tapes: Land of Frost, A New Dimension, Thulcandra, and Cromlech.

Subsequently, they signed a four-album contract with independent label Peaceville Records. In 1990, they recorded their debut studio album, Soulside Journey. Due to a limited budget, the band was unable to secure the studio they wanted. Thanks to support from members of Nihilist and Entombed, they recorded their album at Sunlight Studios. Although primarily a death metal record, it featured elements of black metal in terms of artwork and songwriting.

Following the release of this album, the band continued writing and recording new material, working on tape until an album was ready. These tracks were instrumental, showcasing the band's gradual shift toward black metal. In 1996, the completed album Goatlord was released, featuring vocals by Fenriz.

=== Black metal years ===
==== Early black metal years: 1991–1994 ====
The Darkthrone logo, as it has appeared on the band's releases since its first album, Soulside Journey. It was designed by Tassilo Förg, Gylve "Fenriz" Nagell, and Tomas Lindberg of Grotesque / At the Gates.

In 1991, influenced by Euronymous of Mayhem, Darkthrone adopted the black metal aesthetic, donning corpse paint and using pseudonyms. Gylve Nagell became "Fenriz", Ivar Enger became "Zephyrous", and Ted Skjefull adopted the name "Nocturno Culto”. In August 1991, they recorded their second album, released in early 1992 and titled A Blaze in the Northern Sky. This album featured Darkthrone's first black metal recordings, although Peaceville Records was skeptical about releasing it due to the band's drastic shift from their original style. After the album was recorded, bassist Dag Nilsen left the band, stating that he did not wish to play black metal. He is credited as "session bass" and does not appear in any photographs on the album.

The band's third album, Under a Funeral Moon, was recorded in the summer of 1992 and released in early 1993. It completed Darkthrone's transition to black metal and is considered a landmark in the development of the genre. This album was the last collaboration with guitarist Zephyrous.

Following this, their fourth album, Transilvanian Hunger, was released in February 1994. It was the first album to feature only two members, Nocturno Culto and Fenriz. Fenriz was credited with all instrumentation and songwriting, while Nocturno Culto contributed vocals. From this point forward, the band operated as a duo. A raw, low-fidelity recording style, monotone riffing, and minimal melody characterized Transilvanian Hunger. The album's release sparked controversy because Norwegian black metal musician Varg Vikernes wrote half the lyrics and the booklet contained the phrase "Norsk Arisk Black Metal," which translates to "Norwegian Aryan Black Metal" in English.

==== With Moonfog Records: 1995–2004 ====
Darkthrone transitioned to independent label Moonfog Productions for their subsequent releases. It was run by Satyr of Satyricon.

Their fifth album, Panzerfaust, was released in 1995. Its production resembled that of Transilvanian Hunger, with Fenriz credited for all instrumentation and songwriting, while Nocturno Culto contributed vocals. Vikernes wrote the lyrics for "Quintessence". Their sixth album, Total Death, was released in 1996 and is notable for featuring lyrics penned by four other black metal musicians, with none written by the band's primary lyricist, Fenriz.

During the years 1993–1995, Fenriz was involved in numerous side projects. This included his solo dark ambient project Neptune Towers, his solo folk black metal project Isengard, recording an album with Satyr as part of the trio Storm, and playing bass on Dødheimsgard's debut album. He resumed playing drums for Valhall, which he co-founded in 1988 before leaving in 1990 to focus on Darkthrone.

On 6 April 1996, Easter Eve, Darkthrone played their last show at "A Night of Unholy Black Metal" in a sold-out Rockefeller in Oslo.

In 1999, Darkthrone released the album Ravishing Grimness, followed by Plaguewielder in 2001. While Transilvanian Hunger and Panzerfaust featured songs exclusively written by Fenriz, these two albums contained tracks predominantly composed by Nocturno Culto and were both recorded at Ronny Le Tekrøe's studio in Toten, Norway. This accounts for the "clearer" sound on those records.

In the latter part of the 1990s, two tribute albums dedicated to Darkthrone were released: Darkthrone Holy Darkthrone in 1998 and The Next Thousand Years Are Ours in 1999. The band released Preparing for War, a compilation of songs from 1988 to 1994. In 2002, the intro of their song "Kathaarian Life Code" was included in the final scene of the film Demonlover.

In 2003, the band released the album Hate Them. Although this record and the following one incorporate electronic introductions, they remain faithful to Darkthrone's early black metal style. Sardonic Wrath was released in 2004, the band's last album with Moonfog Productions and their final work recorded exclusively in the black metal style. This album was nominated for Norway's Alarm Awards, but the entry was withdrawn at the band's request. Their subsequent releases exhibited strong crust punk influences.

=== Punk-influenced years: 2005–2010 ===
In 2005, Darkthrone announced their return to Peaceville Records after departing from the label in 1994. They launched their own record label, Tyrant Syndicate Productions, to release their future albums. To commemorate their return, Peaceville reissued the Preparing for War compilation, which included a bonus CD of demos and a DVD of live performances. Darkthrone's first four albums were re-released with video interviews about each.

In January 2006, the group released the EP Too Old, Too Cold, featuring the track "High on Cold War," performed by Enslaved's vocalist Grutle Kjellson. The EP included a cover of "Love in a Void" by Siouxsie and the Banshees. For the first time in their career, the band produced a music video for the EP's title track. Too Old, Too Cold marked Darkthrone's first record to chart, reaching the top 15 of the best-selling singles in Norway and Denmark. That same year, Darkthrone released their eleventh album, The Cult Is Alive. This album marked a stylistic shift, incorporating crust punk elements. While Darkthrone's black metal roots remained evident, their departure from the genre's typical sound was increasingly pronounced. The Cult Is Alive was the first Darkthrone album to enter the album chart in Norway, debuting at number 22.

In July 2007, the band released the EP NWOBHM (an acronym for 'New Wave of Black Heavy Metal', a play on the original 'New Wave of British Heavy Metal') as a preview of their next album. In September of that year, Darkthrone released F.O.A.D. (an acronym for Fuck Off and Die). Numerous thrash metal and punk bands used this phrase in the 1980s. While the music continued the punk-oriented style introduced on The Cult Is Alive, the band placed greater emphasis on traditional heavy metal.

Also in 2007, Nocturno Culto completed and released The Misanthrope, a film exploring black metal and life in Norway. The film included some of his own solo recordings. In October 2008, Dark Thrones and Black Flags was released, following a style similar to the previous album. In 2010, the band released Circle the Wagons, which showcased fewer crust punk elements in favor of strong speed metal and traditional heavy metal characteristics.

=== 2010–present ===
In late 2010, Peaceville acquired the rights to the band's Moonfog albums and reissued Panzerfaust as a two-disc set and on vinyl. The reissue of Total Death was scheduled for 14 March 2011. In July 2012, Darkthrone announced the new album The Underground Resistance, released on 25 February 2013. This album marked a departure from black metal and blackened crust, returning to classic heavy metal and speed metal. The band released their 16th studio album, Arctic Thunder, on 14 October 2016. This album represented another musical shift, featuring a rawer, more blackened sound reminiscent of their 1990s output, but with the classic metal influences of the previous record.

On 22 October 2016, the band announced via Facebook that they would release a compilation album entitled The Wind of 666 Black Hearts. Released on 25 November 2016, the album comprised rehearsals recorded in 1991 and 1992 for songs that later appeared on A Blaze in the Northern Sky and Under a Funeral Moon.

In March 2019, Darkthrone announced the release of their seventeenth studio album, Old Star, which came out on 31 May of the same year. The album featured more emphasis on doom metal than previous releases, with their Candlemass influences becoming more apparent. In January 2021, the band announced they had completed recording a new album. In April 2021, a box set containing early and rare material titled Shadows of Iconoclasm was unveiled. The band's eighteenth studio album, Eternal Hails......, was released on 25 June 2021, through Peaceville Records on physical media and digital platforms. The album continued incorporating traditional doom metal, influenced by Candlemass, alongside inspiration from other bands such as Trouble and Black Sabbath. The band's nineteenth album, Astral Fortress, was released on 28 October 2022. The band's twentieth album, It Beckons Us All......., was released on 26 April 2024. It was recorded in the previous April and May at Chaka Khan Studio in Oslo. In March 2026, it was announced that band's next album, Pre-Historic Metal, would be released in May of that year.

== Band members ==
=== Current ===
- Fenriz (Gylve Fenris Nagell) – drums, guitars, bass, keyboards, vocals (1986–present)
- Nocturno Culto (Ted Skjellum) – vocals, guitars, bass, keyboards (1988–present)

=== Former ===
- Zephyrous (Ivar Enger) – bass (1986–1988), guitars (1988–1993)
- Anders Risberget – guitars (1986–1988)
- Dag Nilsen – bass (1988–1991)

== Discography ==
=== Studio albums ===
Year	Title	Peak positions								Notes
Year	Title	NOR	SWE	FIN	GER	SWI	BEL (WA)	UK Rock	UK Ind.	Notes
1991	Soulside Journey									The band's only death metal studio album.
1992	A Blaze in the Northern Sky									Recorded in August 1991 and released in February 1992. Final release with bassist Dag Nilsen. Since 2020, the album has been on permanent display in the National Library of Norway.
1993	Under a Funeral Moon									Recorded in June 1992 and released in June 1993. Final release with guitarist Ivar Enger.
1994	Transilvanian Hunger									Recorded in November–December 1993, with vocals added early in 1994. Released in February 1994. Featured four songs with lyrics written by Varg Vikernes.
1995	Panzerfaust									Recorded in February–April 1994 and released in June 1995. Featured one song with lyrics written by Varg Vikernes.
1996	Total Death									Featured lyrics written by four guests from other black metal bands.
1996	Goatlord									Instrumental rehearsal demo; recorded in late 1990 and early 1991, released on CD as an album by Moonfog Productions in 1996, including vocals overdubbed by Fenriz in 1994.
1999	Ravishing Grimness									
2001	Plaguewielder									
2003	Hate Them									
2004	Sardonic Wrath									
2006	The Cult Is Alive	22	59							Represented a shift in their style with traits of crust punk.
2007	F.O.A.D.									
2008	Dark Thrones and Black Flags									
2010	Circle the Wagons	23							43	
2013	The Underground Resistance	23	50	35				14	29	
2016	Arctic Thunder			40	56			9	22	
2019	Old Star				27			2	10	Represented a shift in style, with a fusion of traditional doom metal and the 'blackened heavy metal' sound the band cultivated throughout the mid-late 2010s.
2021	Eternal Hails......	31		9	5		160	6	11	
2022	Astral Fortress		56	21	23	51		6	15	
2024	It Beckons Us All......			47	17			4	10	
2026	Pre-Historic Metal			44	27			6	16	

=== Demos ===
- 1988: Land of Frost
- 1988: A New Dimension – rehearsal demo
- 1989: Thulcandra
- 1989: Cromlech – live demo

=== EPs and singles ===
- 2005: Under Beskyttelse av Mørke (Under Cover of Darkness) – outtakes from the Under a Funeral Moon rehearsal sessions; released only in Japan
- 2006: Too Old, Too Cold – outtakes from The Cult Is Alive recording sessions
- 2006: Forebyggende Krig – single
- 2007: NWOBHM – outtakes from the F.O.A.D. recording sessions
- 2013: Leave No Cross Unturned (Edit) – single
- 2017: Burial Bliss / Visual Aggression – single
- 2019: The Hardship of the Scots – single
- 2021: Hate Cloak – single
- 2026: Pre-Historic Metal - single

=== Compilations and tribute albums ===
- 1998: Darkthrone Holy Darkthrone – tribute album featuring eight Norwegian bands
- 1999: The Next Thousand Years Are Ours – tribute album featuring fourteen bands and a multimedia disc
- 2000: Preparing for War – compilation of songs from 1988 to 1994; re-released in 2005 with a bonus CD of demos and a DVD
- 2008: Frostland Tapes – compilation containing the band's early demos (Land of Frost, A New Dimension, Thulcandra, Cromlech), the original instrumental version of Goatlord, and a recording of a concert in Denmark
- 2011: Sempiternal Past – The Darkthrone Demos – remastered versions of Darkthrone's demos (including bonus tracks)
- 2013: Introducing Darkthrone – eighteen-song album containing Darkthrone songs from past albums and singles
- 2013: Peaceville Presents... Darkthrone
- 2014: Black Death and Beyond – compilation released as a vinyl box set and book
- 2016: The Wind of 666 Black Hearts – compilation of demos from 1991 and 1992
- 2021: Shadows of Iconoclasm – compilation box set of early material
