= Peaceville Records =

British independent record label

- Founded: 1987
- Founder: Paul "Hammy" Halmshaw
- Distributor: Snapper Music
- Genre: Extreme metal; heavy metal; hardcore punk
- Country of origin: United Kingdom
- Official website: www.peaceville.com

Peaceville Records is a British independent heavy metal record label. The label was founded by Paul "Hammy" Halmshaw (of the bands Instigators and Civilised Society, as well as a former drummer of Sore Throat) in Dewsbury, England, in 1987. Originally a tape label releasing anarcho punk, the releases moved towards metal through crust punk and similar forms of metal-influenced English hardcore punk. Halmshaw started running the label full-time in 1988, although the original tape label incarnation was founded in 1981 as a vehicle for releasing Instigators demo cassettes.

The label is therefore known for the connection between doom metal and the 1980s English crust punk scene. Sister labels 'Deaf' and 'Dreamtime' concentrated more on thrash metal (Deaf) and psychedelic electronica (Dreamtime).

However, the bands My Dying Bride, Darkthrone, Katatonia, Autopsy, Anathema, Paradise Lost, and Opeth - known as the 'Peaceville Stable' - have been the label's most recognizable acts since the 1990s. Peaceville also became known for its anti-major label stance and left wing political outlook.

In November 2006, after 25 years at the helm, Halmshaw announced that he and co-manager Lisa Halmshaw would be leaving the label to concentrate on new projects, and that his former assistant, Paul Groundwell, would be taking over general management duties, following the sale of the label to back catalogue specialists Snapper Music, who had distributed Peaceville since 2001.

== Bands ==
- Aura Noir
- Autopsy
- Barren Earth
- Bloodbath
- Darkthrone
- Hellripper
- Mayhem
- Mork
- Morta Skuld
- Mortem (NOR)
- Mortuary Drape
- New Skeletal Faces
- Novembre
- Orange Goblin
- The Provenance
- Ruim
- Sigh
- Sikth
- Static Abyss
- Valkyrja
- Violation Wound

== Former bands ==
- Abscess
- Acrimony
- Agathocles
- Akercocke
- Anathema
- Asgaroth
- At the Gates
- Axegrinder
- Baphomet
- Banished
- Behemoth
- Blackstar
- The Blood Divine
- Candlemass
- Carpathian Forest
- Chumbawamba
- Cradle of Filth
- Deviated Instinct
- Dominion
- Doom
- Electro Hippies
- Gallhammer
- Gold, Frankincense and Disk-Drive
- G.G.F.H.
- Isengard
- Impaler
- Katatonia
- Kong
- Madder Mortem
- My Dying Bride
- Napalm Death
- Opeth
- Paradise Lost
- Pentagram
- Pitchshifter
- Sonic Violence
- Taake
- Toranaga
- Therion
- Thine
- Vital Remains
- Wartech

== Compilations ==
- A Vile Peace (1987)
- Vile Vibes (1990)
- Peaceville Volume 4 (1992)
- The Best of Peaceville (1995)
- Autumn Sampler '95 (1995)
- Under the Sign of the Sacred Star (1996)
- Peaceville X (1998)
- Peaceville Classic Cuts (2001)
- Peaceville Sampler 2002 (2002)
- New Dark Classics (2006)
- Metal Hammer (2006)
- New Dark Classics (2007)
- New Dark Classics II (2007)
- New Dark Classics Vol. 4 (2010)
- 21 Years Of Doom, Death & Darkness (2008)
- Katatonia Presents... Peaceville Dark Classics (2011)
- 30 Years of Decadence (2017)
- Dark Side of the Sacred Star (2023)

== See also ==
- List of record labels
