= Erik Wroldsen =

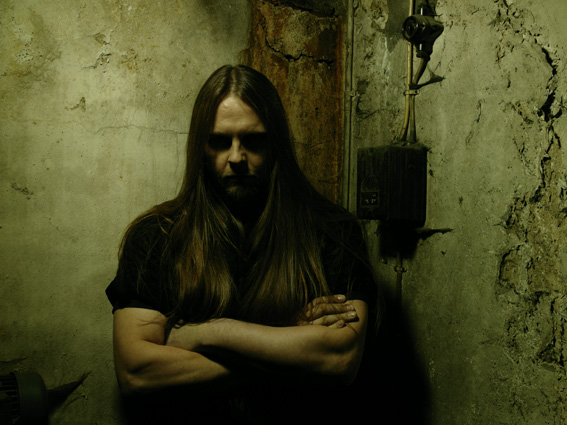

Background information
- Also known as: Wroldsen.com, E_Wroldsen
- Born: Erik Wroldsen; 19 March 1973 (age 53); Arendal, Norway
- Genre: Industrial metal thrash metal progressive metal
- Occupation: Musician
- Instruments: Drums, Pearl Drums, Zildjian cymbals
- Member of: Red Harvest
- Formerly of: Trivial Act
- Website: redharvest.com

Erik Wroldsen (born 19 March 1973) is a heavy metal drummer. His main band was the industrial metal band Red Harvest.

== Discography ==
Decadence

- DECADENCE (Demo) – 1990
- GUNSLINGER (Demo) – 1991
- DANCING ON THE EDGE OF DAWN (Demo) – 1992

Trivial Act

- A GATHERING... of 8 Norwegian Prog. Metal Bands – 1995
- MINDSCAPE – 1997
- SILENT SAND OF DREAMS - 2022
- MYSTIC SIGNALS - 2022
- CHANGE - 2023

Red Harvest

- NEW RAGE WORLD MUSIC – 1998
- Cold Dark Matter – 2000
- New World Rage Music – 2001
- Sick Transit Gloria Mundi – 2002
- Internal Punishment Programs – 2004
- Harvest Bloody Harvest (DVD) 18. September – 2006
- A Greater Darkness – 2007
- The Red Line Archives – 2008
- Anarchaos Divine: The Trinity of the Soundtrack to the Apocalypse - 2014
- Hybreed (Double CD Version) - 2017

Other

- A NORWEGIAN TRIBUTE TO THE RAMONES (1 Song) – 2005
