= Ursa =

Ursa is a Latin word meaning female bear. Derivatives of this word are ursine or Ursini.

Ursa or URSA may also refer to:

== General ==
- Ursa (Finland), a Finnish astronomical association
- Ursa (spider), a spider genus in the family Araneidae
- Ursa Major, the Great Bear constellation
- Ursa Minor, the Small Bear constellation
- Ursa the Bear, a former public sculpture in Bristol
- HMS Ursa, the name of two ships of the Royal Navy
- Blackmagic URSA, a digital movie camera

== Places ==
- Ursa, Illinois, a village in the United States
- Ursa, a village in Gârcov Commune, Olt County, Romania
- Ursa Motoșeni, the former name of Motoșeni Commune, Bacău County, Romania
- Ursolovo - place in Radilovo - Bulgaria

== People ==
- Urša, feminine given name

== Media ==
- Ursa, a monster in the film After Earth
- Ursa, a mother of Zuko and Azula in the franchise Avatar: The Last Airbender
- Ursa, a girlfriend of Bear in the television series Bear in the Big Blue House
- Ursa, a character in the animation series Disney's Adventures of the Gummi Bears
- Ursa, a bear-like race in the franchise Dota
  - Ulfsaar the Ursa Warrior, a notable character of that race
- Ursa, a character in the franchise Open Season
- Ursa (DC Comics), a kryptonian villain in the franchise Superman
- Ursa Corregidora, a protagonist in the novel Corregidora
- Ursa Wren, a fictional character in the animation series Star Wars Rebels
- Ursas, a type of antagonistic monster featured in the animation series RWBY
- URSA (album), 2016 studio album by Novembre
- Ursaal, a Viltrumite Warrior in the series, Invincible

== See also ==
- Ersa (disambiguation)
- Erza
- Ursus (disambiguation)
