= Resist (disambiguation) =

A resist is something that is added to parts of an object to create a pattern by protecting these parts from being affected by a subsequent stage in the manufacturing process.

Resist may also refer to:

- Resist dyeing, applied to textiles
- Photoresist (often just referred to as "resist") applied to photolithography
- Resist (semiconductor fabrication), applied to semiconductor fabrication

== Music ==
- Resist (Kosheen album), or the title song
- Resist (Midnight Oil album), 2022
- Resist (Within Temptation album)
- Kuʻe, translated Resist, album by Sudden Rush
- "Resist", a song by As Blood Runs Black from the album Instinct
- "Resist", a song by Front Line Assembly from the album Caustic Grip
- "Resist", a song by Grief of War from the album A Mounting Crisis...As Their Fury Got Released
- "Resist", a song by M.O.D. from the album Devolution
- "Resist", a song by Red Harvest from the album There's Beauty in the Purity of Sadness
- "Resist", a song by Rush from the album Test for Echo
- "Resist", a song by Armageddon Dildos
- "Resist", a song by Levitation
- Resist Records, label
- Resist Music, label related to React Music Limited

== Organizations ==
- RESIST (electoral list), which contested the 2003 Belgian general election
- RESIST (non-profit), based in Somerville, Massachusetts, United States
- Resist, The Resistance Movement, The Resist Festival, Resistance TV, a network of left-wing groups launched by politician Chris Williamson in the UK in 2019.

== Other uses ==
- Resist (book), a 2024 book by Rita Omokha about American black youth activism
- "Resist" (Supergirl), an episode of the television series Supergirl
- Response Evaluation Criteria in Solid Tumors, a set of rules for evaluating responses in cancer treatment
- The Resistance (American political movement), a predominantly left-wing movement that protests Donald Trump's presidency

== See also ==
- "Refuse/Resist", song by Sepultura from the album Chaos A.D.
- Resistance (disambiguation)
- Resistor
