= The Red Line Archives =

Compilation album by Red Harvest
- Released: 14 April 2008
- Genre: Industrial metal
- Length: 46:37
- Label: Indie Recordings
- Producer: Red Harvest

Red Harvest chronology
A Greater Darkness (2007)	The Red Line Archives (2008)

The Red Line Archives is the ninth release by Industrial metal band Red Harvest. It was released on 14 April 2008. It is a compilation album released under the motto "Something new, something old, something borrowed, something cold". It consists of remixes, unreleased tracks and songs from previous releases, which have all been remastered. "Technokrate" is a mash-up of the songs "Teknocrate" (Internal Punishment Programs) and "Absolut Dunkel:Heit" (Cold Dark Matter). "Cyborg Era / Dead End" is a mash-up of "Death in Cyborg Era" (Cold Dark Matter) and [Dead End] (Sick Transit Gloria Mundi). "The Central Sun - Part 1" is an ambient piece based on a sample from "Black Flowers Please" by Current 93.

== Track listing ==
- All songs written by Red Harvest.
1. Move Or Be Moved (Full Version Mix 2008) - 5:40 (from Cold Dark Matter)
2. Dead (ReFactor 2008) - 4:46 (from Sick Transit Gloria Mundi, ReFactor 2008 remix)
3. Last Call - 4:39 (from Cold Dark Matter)
4. Abstract Moral - Junction Mix - 3:04 (from Internal Punishment Programs, 2008 remix)
5. Synthesize My DNA - 4:05 (from Internal Punishment Programs)
6. Bleed - 2:33 (unreleased song from 1996)
7. 4418 - 1:52 (from Internal Punishment Programs)
8. Desolation - 5:52 (from Sick Transit Gloria Mundi)
9. Technocrate (Dunkelheit Version 2008) - 4:45
10. Cyborg Era / Dead End (Remix 2008) - 5:07
11. The Central Sun - Part 1 - 4:21 (unreleased song from 1996)

== Personnel ==
- Ofu Khan: Vocals, guitars, synth, samples
- TurboNatas: Guitars
- Lrz: Synth, samples, programming
- E_Wroldsen: Drums, percussion
- Thomas B.: Bass
