= Esra =

Esra is a common Turkish given name for females. It is also a common Arabic name as Isra or Asra. People named Esra include:

== Given name ==
- Esra Battaloğlu, Turkish geneticist
- Esra Bayrak (born 1998), Turkish Paralympian athlete
- Esra Bilgiç (born 1992), Turkish actress
- Esra Bozabalı (born 1991), Turkish sport shooter
- Esra Dalfidan (born 1975), Turkish singer
- Esra Dermancıoğlu (born 1968), Turkish actress
- Esra Erol (born 1985), Turkish women's footballer
- Esra Erdoğan (born 1983), daughter of Turkish President Recep Tayyip Erdoğan
- Esra Güler (born 1994), Turkish women's footballer
- Esra Gümüş (born 1982), Turkish volleyball player
- Esra Gündar (born 1980), Turkish handball player
- Esra Kiraz (born 1992), Turkish armwrestler
- Esra Manya (born 1999), Turkish-Azerbaijani football player
- Esra Mungan, Turkish academic
- Esra Özatay (born 1976), Turkish female military officer and military aerobatics aviator
- Esra Özkan (born 1996), Turkish women's footballer
- Esra Sibel Tezkan (born 1993), Turkish-German women's footballer
- Esra Şencebe (born 1991), Turkish basketball player
- Esra Solmaz (born 1995), Turkish women's footballer
- Esra Tromp (born 1990), Dutch female cyclist
- Esra Vural (born 1983), German voice actress
- Esra Yıldız (born 1997), Turkish female boxer
- Princess Esra (born 1936), a princess of the Asaf Jah Dynasty of Hyderabad state

== See also ==
- ESRA (disambiguation)
