= Ann-Mari Edvardsen =

Norwegian singer and keyboardist

- Born: Ann-Mari Edvardsen; 6 November 1973 (age 52); Trondheim, Norway
- Genres: Classical; opera; avant-garde; doom metal; experimental music; progressive metal
- Occupations: Singer-songwriter; musician
- Instruments: Vocals; keyboards
- Years active: 1995 to present
- Labels: Voices of Wonders; Season of Mist
- Website: Ann-Mari's Official Site

Ann-Mari Edvardsen (born 6 November 1973 in Trondheim) is a Norwegian coloratura soprano opera singer and keyboardist. She is best known as the former vocalist of Norwegian doom metal/avant-garde band The 3rd and the Mortal from 1995 to 1997 and for Tactile Gemma from 1997 to 2001.

Along with a career in metal music, Edvarsen also has a career in opera music. She has musical experience from Trøndelag Conservatory of Music and the University College of Opera in Stockholm.

== Musical career ==
=== 1995–1997: The 3rd and the Mortal ===
After the departure of Kari Rueslåtten, a friend of Edvardsen from school told her about their search for a new voice. She was brought to their rehearsal without them knowing, believing that the band already knew about her audition. After a jam session to the track that later got the title "Neurosis", Edvardsen became their new singer the same day, they didn't try anybody else.

Edvardsen debuted with The 3rd and the Mortal in their 1995 EP Nightswan. A year later, the band released their second full-length album Painting on Glass, but on this album, it featured little to no metal compared to their previous album and was more experimental. The band furthered explored more in the experimental genre in their next release In This Room in 1997, the album's single Stream became a popular song on the radio in Trondheim, receiving more recognition.

Some time later that year after the release and tour, Edvardsen departed from the band due pursue a career in opera.

=== Other works ===
In 2001, Edvardsen was a session lead vocalist for Italian progressive metal band Novembre in the album Novembrine Waltz covering Cloudbusting by Kate Bush. In 2005, she was again a session vocalist for Norwegian death metal band Antestor in the album The Forsaken.

== Personal life ==
Edvarsen is sisters with Monika Edvardsen. Monika is a former vocalist of Atrox; she also formed Tactile Gemma.

During her studies in Stockholm, Edvarsen met her husband; they married in Norway. The couple have five children, born between 2005 and 2013.

== Discography ==
=== With The 3rd and the Mortal ===
Studio Albums:

- Painting on Glass (1996)
- In This Room (1997)

Singles:

- Stream (1996)

EPs:

- Nightswan (1995)

=== With Tactile Gemma ===
Demos:

- Tactile Gemma demo (1998)

Studio Albums:

- Tactile Gemma (2001)

=== As a guest/session musician ===
- Novembre: Novembrine Waltz (2001) – guest vocals on "Cloudbusting" (Kate Bush cover)
- Antestor: The Forsaken (2005) – session vocalist
- Autumn Tears: The Glow of Desperation (2021) - guest vocals on "The Voice of Spring"

== Operas ==
- Bajazzo
- Carmina Burana
- La Boheme
