= Erza =

Erza may refer to:

== People ==
- Erza, or Erzya, a subgroup of the indigenous Mordvins of Russia
  - Erza Native Religion, Mordvin native religion

=== Given name ===
- Erza Muqoli, French singer

=== Surname ===
- Berthe Erza, French-Algerian singer

=== Fiction ===
- Erza Scarlet, a character in the manga and anime series Fairy Tail
- Queen Erza, a character from the animated film Muzzy in Gondoland and its sequel Muzzy Comes Back

== Places ==
- Erza McKenzie Round Barn, Buchanan County, Iowa, U.S.

== See also ==
- Ersa (disambiguation)
- Erzya (disambiguation)
- Ezra (disambiguation)
- Ursa (disambiguation)
- Urza, a character in Magic: the Gathering
