= Tears Laid in Earth =

Studio album by The 3rd and the Mortal
- Released: October 21, 1994
- Recorded: July 1994
- Genre: Doom metal
- Length: 66:23
- Label: Voices of Wonder

The 3rd and the Mortal chronology
Sorrow (1994)	Tears Laid in Earth (1994)	Painting on Glass (1996)

Tears Laid in Earth is the debut studio album by doom metal band The 3rd and the Mortal. This album was the release in which the band was first categorized as a doom metal act; however, they have since experimented with genres such as progressive rock, jazz and electronica, making this their last true doom metal release. This was also the last album to feature singer Kari Rueslåtten.

== Track listing ==
No.	Title	Length
1.	"Vandring"	1:40
2.	"Why So Lonely?"	5:14
3.	"Atupoéma"	4:41
4.	"Death-Hymn"	8:24
5.	"Shaman"	3:28
6.	"Trial of Past"	5:14
7.	"Lengsel"	2:06
8.	"Salva Me"	4:38
9.	"Song"	6:37
10.	"In Mist Shrouded"	5:35
11.	"Oceana"	18:46
Total length:		66:23

== Personnel ==
- Kari Rueslåtten – voices, synthesizer (on "Shaman" and "Song")
- Finn Olav Holthe – electric guitar, Guitar treatments, additional vocals (on "Death-Hymn")
- Geir Nilsen – electric guitar, solo
- Trond Engum – electric guitar, solo
- Bernt Rundberget – bass guitar
- Rune Hoemsnes – drums, percussion

=== Production Staff ===
- Terje Hansen – cover photography
- Paul Westum – cover design
- Hans Petter Vik – engineering, mixing
- Lars Lien – engineering, mixing
- Egil Tröa – sleeve photography
