= Urs (given name) =

Urs is a masculine given name. From the Latin name Ursus, the name means "bear". It is a popular name in German-speaking Switzerland due to the historical veneration of Saint Ursus in Switzerland.

There is a community in Mysore/Bengaluru with the last name Urs. Urs means king in the local language. They were the leaders of the village in the old age. The Mysore dynasty also had very confident employees from this community and few became part of the King family. The current Mysore scion king was adopted from the Urs community. This is a small community of around 500,000 across the globe.

Notable people with the name include:

- Urs Allemann (1948–2024), Swiss writer and journalist
- Urs App (born 1949), Swiss orientalist
- Urs Bühler (born 1971), Swiss tenor
- Urs Egger (1953–2020), Swiss film and television director
- Urs Fischer (artist) (born 1973), Swiss artist
- Urs Fischer (footballer) (born 1966), Swiss footballer and football manager
- Urs Freuler (born 1958), Swiss former cyclist
- Urs Noel Glutz von Blotzheim (born 1932), Swiss ornithologist
- Urs Graf (1485–after 1529), Swiss painter and printmaker
- Urs Imboden (born 1975), Swiss-Moldovan alpine skier
- Urs Hölzle, Swiss software engineer and technology executive
- Urs Kälin (born 1966), Swiss former alpine skier
- Urs Lehmann (born 1969), Swiss former alpine skier
- Urs Leimgruber (born 1952), Swiss saxophonist
- Urs Lüthi (born 1947), Swiss artist
- Urs Meier (born 1959), Swiss football referee
- Urs A. Meyer (born 1938), Swiss physician and clinical pharmacologist
- Urs Odermatt (born 1955), Swiss film director and author
- Urs Räber (born 1958), Swiss former alpine skier
- Urs Rechn (born 1978), German actor
- Urs Rohner (born 1959), Swiss lawyer, businessman and banker
- Urs Schreiber (born 1974), mathematician
- Urs Schwarzenbach (born 1948), Swiss financier
- Urs Widmer (1938–2014), Swiss author
- Urs Zimmermann (born 1959), Swiss former cyclist
- Hans Urs von Balthasar (1905–1988), Swiss theologian

== See also ==
- Bjorn, name also meaning bear
