= Painting on Glass =

Studio album by The 3rd and the Mortal
- Released: January 19, 1996
- Genre: Experimental rock, doom metal
- Length: 64:02
- Label: Voices of Wonder
- Producer: Lars Lien; Tor Breivik; The 3rd and the Mortal

The 3rd and the Mortal chronology
Tears Laid in Earth (1994)	Painting on Glass (1996)	In This Room (1997)

Painting on Glass is the second studio album by The 3rd and the Mortal.

== Track listing ==
1. "Magma" - 4:25
2. "Commemoration" - 5:41
3. "Crystal Orchids" - 2:59
4. "Persistent and Fleeting" - 5:58
5. "White Waters" - 2:50
6. "Aurora Borealis" - 1:32
7. "Dreamscapes" - 4:31
8. "Aurora Australis" - 2:39
9. "Azure" - 4:00
10. "Veiled Exposure" - 5:22
11. "Stairs" - 2:27
12. "Eat the Distance" - 7:11
13. "Vavonia, part II" - 7:23
14. "Horizons" - 7:04

== Credits ==
=== Band ===
- Rune Hoemsnes – Drums and percussion
- Bernt Rundberget – Bass-guitars
- Ann-Mari Edvardsen – Vocals, keyboards
- Trond Engum – Electric and acoustic guitars
- Geir Nilssen – Electric and acoustic guitars, keyboards
- Finn Olav Holthe – Guitar treatments, acoustic guitar, keyboards, tapes

=== Additional Musicians ===
- Ola Evensen – Trombone
- Lars Lien – Mellotron and ARP synth
- Oddrun Solberg – Church organ
- Aksel Hagen Tjora – Didjeridoo
- Sigurd Engum – Waterbucket
- Øyvind Klungseth Zalsen – Keyboards
- Monika Edvardsen – Additional vocals
