= In This Room =

Studio album by The 3rd and the Mortal
- Released: March 21, 1997
- Genre: Experimental rock
- Length: 53:13
- Label: Voices of Wonder

The 3rd and the Mortal chronology
Painting on Glass (1996)	In This Room (1997)	Memoirs (2002)

In This Room is the third studio album by the band The 3rd and the Mortal.

This was the band's second and also last album with Ann-Mari Edvardsen on vocal duty. The band had also left the doom metal sound for a more "atmospheric" sound. The album was given positive reviews by newspapers such as Tidens Krav ("die throw" 5), Aftenposten, Jærbladet, Driva ("die throw" 5) and Hamar Arbeiderblad ("die throw" 5). More mediocre reviews were issued by Rogalands Avis, Adresseavisen, Nordlands Framtid ("die throw" 4) and VG ("die throw" 4).

== Track listing ==
No.	Title	Length
1.	"Stream"	4:25
2.	"Monody"	3:47
3.	"So Pure"	4:02
4.	"The Wooden Lodge"	2:37
5.	"Sophisticated Vampires"	4:11
6.	"Harvest"	4:25
7.	"Did You"	4:48
8.	"Myriad of Peep-holes"	4:49
9.	"Sort of Invisible"	4:26
10.	"A Touch of..."	4:53
11.	"Hollow"	5:16
12.	"The Barge"	1:29
13.	"Sleep"	4:05
Total length:		53:13

Japanese version
No.	Title	Length
14.	"Elephantine Waltz"	4:19
Total length:		57:32

=== Personnel ===
Adapted from the album's liner notes.

- Rune Hoemsnes – Drums, percussion, and programming
- Bernt Rundberget – Bass guitars
- Ann-Mari Edvardsen – Vocals, keyboards, lyrics
- Trond Engum – Electric and acoustic guitars
- Geir Nilssen – Electric and acoustic guitars, grand piano, keyboards
- Finn Olav Holthe – Guitar treatments, keyboards, tapes, loops

=== Additional musicians ===
- Rudolv Vassgaier – Wurlitzer
- Stein Jørgen Øien – Filter synth
- Torsk – Egg

=== Production ===
- Tor Torsk Breivik – Producer
- Lars Lien – Producer
- Jon Marius Åreskjold – Programming
- Monika Edvsardsen - Photography
- Audun Strype - mastering
- Bror Frode Karlsson - artwork
