= Cold Dark Matter =

Cold Dark Matter may refer to:

- Cold dark matter, a hypothetical form of dark matter in cosmology and physics
- Cold Dark Matter (Psychic TV album)
- Cold Dark Matter (Red Harvest album), 2000
