= ESRA =

ESRA may refer to:

- European Safety and Reliability Association
- European Survey Research Association, founded in 2005 to provide coordination in the field of Survey Research in Europe
- École Supérieure de Réalisation Audiovisuelle, a French educational academy
- Entertainment Software Rating Association, Iranian video game rating body
- Experimental Sounding Rocket Association, a supporter of the Spaceport America Cup

== See also ==
- Ezra (disambiguation)
- Esra
