= HyBreed =

Studio album by Red Harvest
- Released: 1996
- Genre: Industrial metal; doom metal; sludge metal
- Length: 78:03
- Label: Voices Of Wonder

Red Harvest chronology
There's Beauty in the Purity of Sadness (1994)	HyBreed (1996)	Cold Dark Matter (2000)

HyBreed is the third album by industrial metal band Red Harvest. It was released in 1996.

== Track listing ==
HyBreed track listing
No.	Title	Length
1.	"Maztürnation"	3:13
2.	"The Lone Walk"	10:07
3.	"Mutant"	3:42
4.	"After All..."	4:20
5.	"Ozrham"	9:44
6.	"On Sacred Ground"	9:34
7.	"The Harder They Fall"	4:07
8.	"Underwater"	8:33
9.	"Monumental"	6:22
10.	"In Deep"	12:27
11.	"The Burning Wheel"	5:54
