= Wroldsen =

Wroldsen is a Norwegian surname. Notable people with the surname include:

- Erik Wroldsen (born 1973), Norwegian heavy metal drummer
- Ernst Wroldsen (1944–2023), Norwegian politician
- Ina Wroldsen (born 1984), Norwegian composer and singer
