= Rita Omokha =

Nigerian American journalist and author

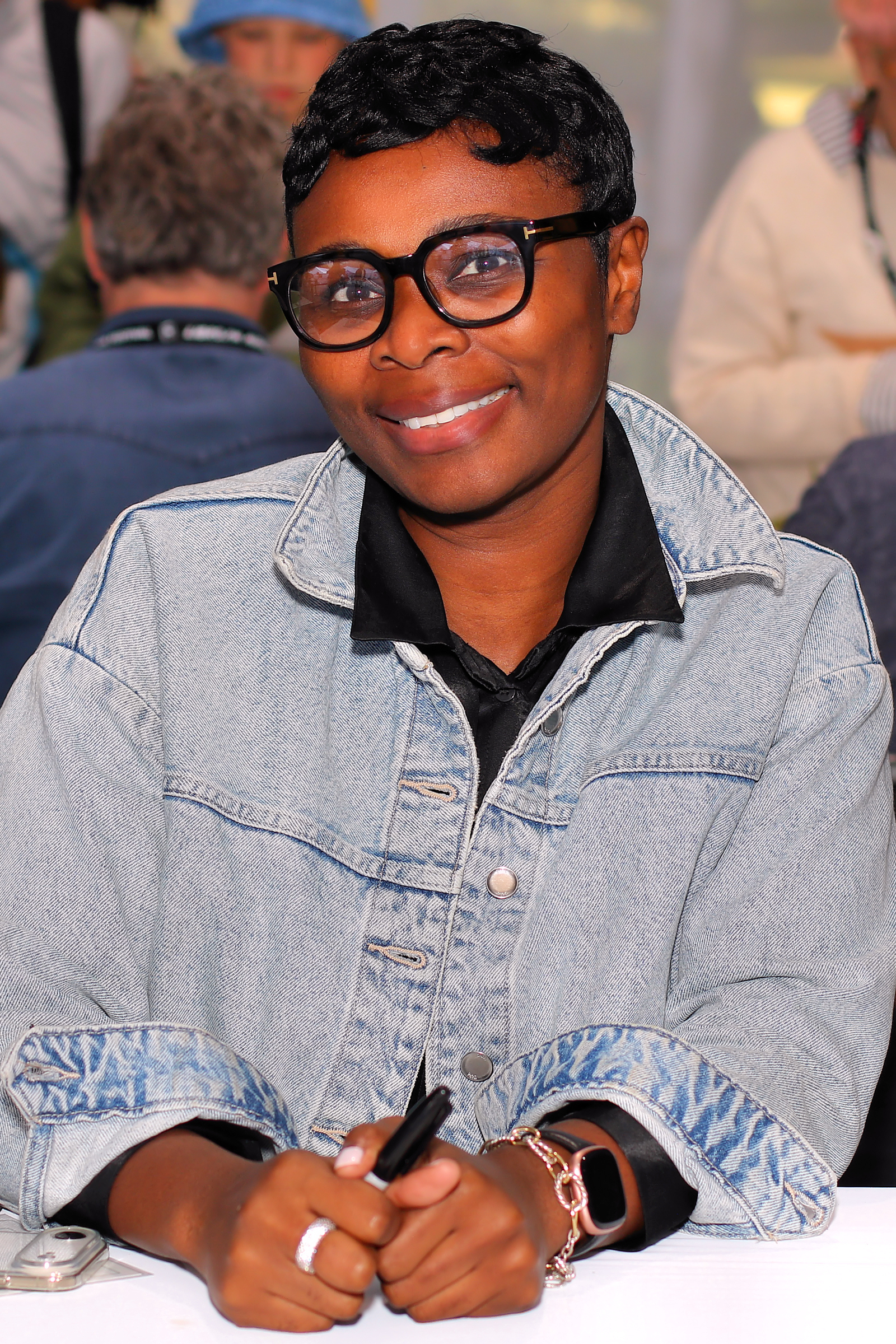
- Omokha at the 2025 Texas Book Festival
- Born: Benin City, Edo State, Nigeria
- Education: Columbia University
- Occupations: Journalist, author, social entrepreneur
- Organization: Columbia University
- Notable work: Resist: How a Century of Young Black Activists Shaped America
- Awards: Pulitzer Prize Traveling Fellowship; Campbell Award; Society of Professional Journalists
- Website: ritaomokha.com

Rita Omokha (born in Benin City) is a Nigerian American journalist, author, and the founder of the nonprofit organization Her Climb, which supports young women from underrepresented and underresourced backgrounds as they prepare for college and build early career pathways. She is a contributing writer for The Guardian, Vanity Fair, and Elle. In 2024, she published a book called Resist: How a Century of Young Black Activists Shaped America.

She is an adjunct professor at Columbia University Graduate School of Journalism.

== Early life and education ==
Omokha was born and partly raised in Benin City, Edo State. She is the youngest of four children, with three brothers.

Omokha and her brothers moved to the United States in 1995, joining her mother in the South Bronx, who had been the beneficiary of the Immigration Act of 1990. She has written about her immigrant experience in America, once writing, “I was first christened 'African booty scratcher' in fourth grade...It sounded ridiculous, but it pricked when my classmates would belly-laugh at my expense. This is also my earliest memory of Black America.”

In 2020, Omokha earned a Master of Science in journalism from Columbia University. While there, she earned the Pulitzer Prize Traveling Fellowship, among other honors.

== Career ==
Omokha began her freelance writing career in 2020 and has freelanced for Elle, The Guardian, Vanity Fair, and The Washington Post.

Following the events of 2020, Omokha traveled to “30 states in 32 days” to report on race relations across the country. The project, titled “America Redefined,” was published in Elle. The 10-part feature was a finalist for the Livingston Award and won the Society of Professional Journalists’s Magazine Feature Reporting award. The judges said, “the America Redefined story offers a personal look beyond the harsh realities of our nation: racism, the impact that the death of George Floyd and the pandemic that turned the world upside down. It's a journey of exploration and self-discovery as the reporter reevaluated her existence in America and provided context for what it means to live in this modern society.”

In addition to writing, Omokha is a graduate-level educator at Columbia University.

== Selected works ==
- "They are the last two WWII Navajo code talkers. This is their story.", National Geographic, 2025.
- "10 Years On, Michael Brown's and Eric Garner's Mothers Are Still Fighting for Justice", Vanity Fair, 2024.
- "Florida Congressman Maxwell Frost on the Power of Gen Z, Family, and Organizing", Teen Vogue, 2023.
- "The Pain and Glory of Cori Bush", New York Magazine, 2022.
- "‘They don't have any humanity’: Black immigrants in Ice custody report abuse and neglect", The Guardian, 2022.
- "Val Demings Is on a Mission", Vanity Fair, 2022.
- "In the Shadows: The Orphans COVID Left Behind", Vanity Fair, 2021.
- "She's Become a Symbol of a Movement: Gwen Carr, Political Powerhouse, Is a Force to Be Reckoned With", Vanity Fair, 2021.
- "I See My Work as Talking Back: How Critical Race Theory Mastermind Kimberlé Crenshaw Is Weathering the Culture Wars", Vanity Fair, 2021.
- "On his 25th birthday, Michael Brown's mother reflects on his life and her ongoing fight for justice", The Washington Post, 2021.
- "They Were Sons", Vanity Fair, 2021.
- "America Redefined", Elle, 2021.
- "George Floyd Could Have Been My Brother", Elle, 2020.

== Awards ==
Omokha's articles have been recognized by the Society of Professional Journalists, the Livingston Award, the Pulitzer board, the Dart Center for Journalism and Trauma, and the Education Writers Association.

== Philanthropy and social impact ==
In 2025, Omokha founded Her Climb, a 501(c)(3) nonprofit organization in New York City providing mentorship, leadership programs, and college and career preparation for high school girls from underserved communities. The organization operates year-round programming and takes place at Columbia University.

== Books ==
Omokha's debut nonfiction book, Resist: How a Century of Young Black Activists Shaped America, was published by Macmillan in the US on November 19, 2024. It was named a 2024 fall notable book by Publishers Weekly's adult preview: history.

According to an excerpt in Teen Vogue, Omokha said of the book

I trace a century of Black youth activism, from early organizers like Ella Baker in the 1920s to Barbara Johns and Charlie Cobb in the 1950s and 1960s, respectively, to the first glimpses of allyship in The Bates Seven and The Wilmington Ten, all the way to today's generation and the continued fight against police violence and racial injustice. Resist examines this longstanding tradition of student mobilization, a force with far-reaching consequences for this nation. It argues that youth activism is the lifeblood of American democracy, the very essence of the free and enduring nation we inherit today.

When discussing the takeaways from Resist during an MSNBC Morning Joe interview, Omokha said that the people she covers in Resist show that "your voice is your weapon."

Resist was included on several book lists including Elle, Glamour UK, Audible, BookRiot, The Next Big Idea Club, Publishers Weekly, and The Root.

In a review of the "Best Books of November 2024", Glamour UK described Resist as a "paradigm-shifting book," stating that it "not only celebrates the courage and determination of these young leaders but also emphasises the importance of their voices in shaping the future."

In a starred review from Booklist, A. E. Siraki describes Resist as "incredibly detailed and accessibly readable." Siraki discusses how "Omokha intersperses stories of individual race crimes with broader movements such as the formation of the NAACP, steadily guiding readers through each era. She helpfully bridges one time period with the next with the precision of a documentary filmmaker."

In another starred review, BookPage called Resist "a must-read for anyone looking to dive into the collected history of Black youth activism and its immense impact on America—and perhaps learn how to take action themselves."

Forbes referenced the book's timeliness: "At a time when activism and protest are happening throughout the U.S... Resist is particularly engaging as Omokha weaves in her experiences as a Black immigrant in the U.S., offering a personal voice."

Elle said, "Omokha reminds us that young Black activists have always been beacons of hope and insisted on making America live up to its promise."

Other critical reviews include those from Jonathan Eig, who called the book "Bold, inspiring, an act of resistance in itself." Jelani Cobb said Omokha "has written a crucial distillation of a century of activism and the changes wrought by it." Sunny Hostin called the book a "crucial asset and resource for today's society" and that "encapsulates the everlasting and unwavering fight for justice and equality led by the trailblazing activists from decades past who are still influencing young Black leaders today."

Resist was featured at the 2025 Los Angeles Times Festival of Books, where Omokha participated in the "Speak Out: The Evolution of Activism" panel and book signing.

== Bibliography ==
- Resist: How a Century of Young Black Activists Shaped America, Macmillan (2024), ISBN 978-1250290984
