= Ursini =

Ursini may refer to:

- Ursini (surname)
- Ursini (Araneidae), a spider tribe in the subfamily Araneinae comprising only the genus Ursa
- Ursinae, in some systems a bear tribe comprising the genus Ursus sensu lato (i. e. the genera Ursus sensu stricto, Protarctos, Helarctos, and Melursus), corresponding to the subfamily Ursinae in some other systems
- a section in the subgenus Rubus of the genus Rubus taxonomy
- a small bipedal alien species in the Mythology of Stargate
- Ursini, a prefix claimed by the Croatian noble family Blagajski, a cadet branch of the Babonić family

== See also ==
- Orsini (disambiguation)
