= Nomindsland =

Studio album by Red Harvest
- Released: May 1992
- Recorded: 1991
- Studio: Warehouse Studios
- Genre: Thrash metal; progressive metal; avant-garde metal
- Length: 40:23
- Label: Black Mark
- Producer: Red Harvest

Red Harvest chronology
Psychotica (1989)	Nomindsland (1992)	There's Beauty in the Purity of Sadness (1994)

Nomindsland is the debut album by the industrial metal band Red Harvest, released through Black Mark Production in 1992. It is notable for being their only release that could be described as thrash metal, before the band moved towards industrial metal.

== Track listing ==
All tracks are written by Red Harvest.

No.	Title	Length
1.	"The Cure"	6:22
2.	"Righteous Majority"	5:00
3.	"Acid"	3:08
4.	"No Next Generation"	6:25
5.	"Machines Way"	5:32
6.	"(Live & Pay) The Holy Way"	6:28
7.	"Crackman"	1:19
8.	"Face the Fact"	3:27
9.	"Wrong Arm of the Law"	2:42
Total length:		40:23

== Personnel ==
Red Harvest

- Jimmy Bergsten - vocals, guitar
- Jan F. Nygård guitar
- Thomas Brandt - bass
- Cato Bekkevold - drums

Production

- Kaj Goritzka - photography (cover art)
- Bjørn Opsahl - photography
- Tom "SM" Hansen - engineering
- Kai Andersen - mixing
- Dag Kjelsaas - photography (cover art)
