= The Tables =

Norwegian underground/DIY pop group

The Tables was an underground/DIY pop group formed in Oslo, Norway, in 1988. The three main musicians were Bartleby (vocals, real name Tore Sørensen), Robert Birdeye (bass guitar and drums, real name Steinar Buholm), and Reg Trademark (guitar, real name Ståle Caspersen).

The band was connected to an earlier group called The Bottle Collectors. The Tables' original trio recorded their first 7-inch, Diary EP, which was released on the new-founded Voices of Wonder label in 1988.

Their first vinyl album was called Shady Whims & Obstacles. For the album, which was released on their own Schtooopid Records in 1990, they recruited Sandy Shore (real name Kjersti Gravklev) on Farfisa organ, and Mono (real name Benedikte Sterner) on drums.

The Tables broke up soon after the release, but the original trio reformed in 1996 or 1997 to record their second album, Holiday at Wobbledef Grunch, released on Perfect Pop Records, a small label that was run by the group members and others from the indie-pop scene in Oslo.

The band once again broke up, but reformed in 2000 and made their third and final album, Nevermynd the Hillocks (Treble Without a Cause), again on Perfect Pop Records; it was released in 2003. The band had a host of different members during this stage, most of them contributing to their last album.

Between their first and second albums they also recorded eight songs for a split album with Astroburger, under the name Monsters of Doom, consisting of Bartleby, Trademark, Birdeye, Shore and Mike Mushroom (real name Mikkel Bay Vold). All of The Tables and Monsters of Doom output has been released on CD by Perfect Pop.

The music on all The Tables' three albums was a mixture of psychedelic pop inspired by English groups of the 1960s (especially the music represented on the Rubble compilation series on Bam-Caruso Records) and early indie pop à la Television Personalities; while the Monsters of Doom tracks were more psychedelic and hard-edged. With their whimsy, somewhat surrealistic lyrics, and melodic hooks, The Tables gained a reputation in the Norwegian underground and other parts of the world.

== Discography ==
- The Diary EP (Voices of Wonder, 1989)
- The Lantern Light Flexi 7-inch (1990)
- From Trash To Gloss (fanclubcassette, 1990)
- Live at Bootleg (fanclubcassette, (1990)
- Shady Whims & Obstacles (Schtooopid Records, 1990)
- Lost on Venus Split-LP w/Astroburger under the name Monsters of Doom (Perfect Pop 1991)
- Shady Whimps with Spectacles (fanclubcassette, 1993)
- Excerpt from the Bruce Springsteen Report 7-inch (Farce Recordings 1995)
- Holiday at Wobbledef Grunch (Perfect Pop, 1997)
- Kjære alle sammen cdep/7-inch (Voices of Wonder, 1997)
- The Tables Play Idle Race 7-inch (Kippers Records, 2000)
- See Emily Play/Arnold Layne 7-inch (Two Zero Records, 2000)
- Nevermynd the Hillocks (Treble Without a Cause) (Perfect Pop, 2003)
