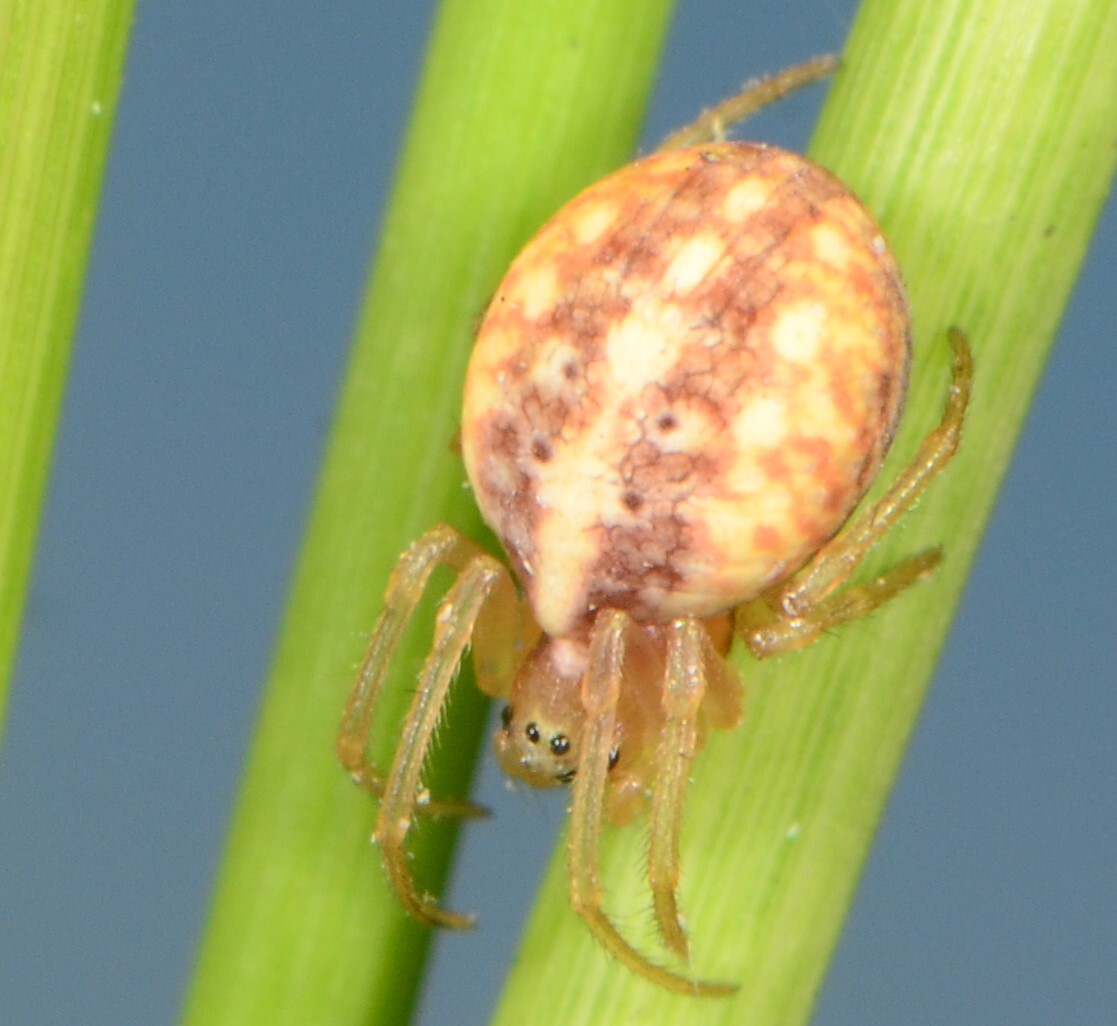
- Female
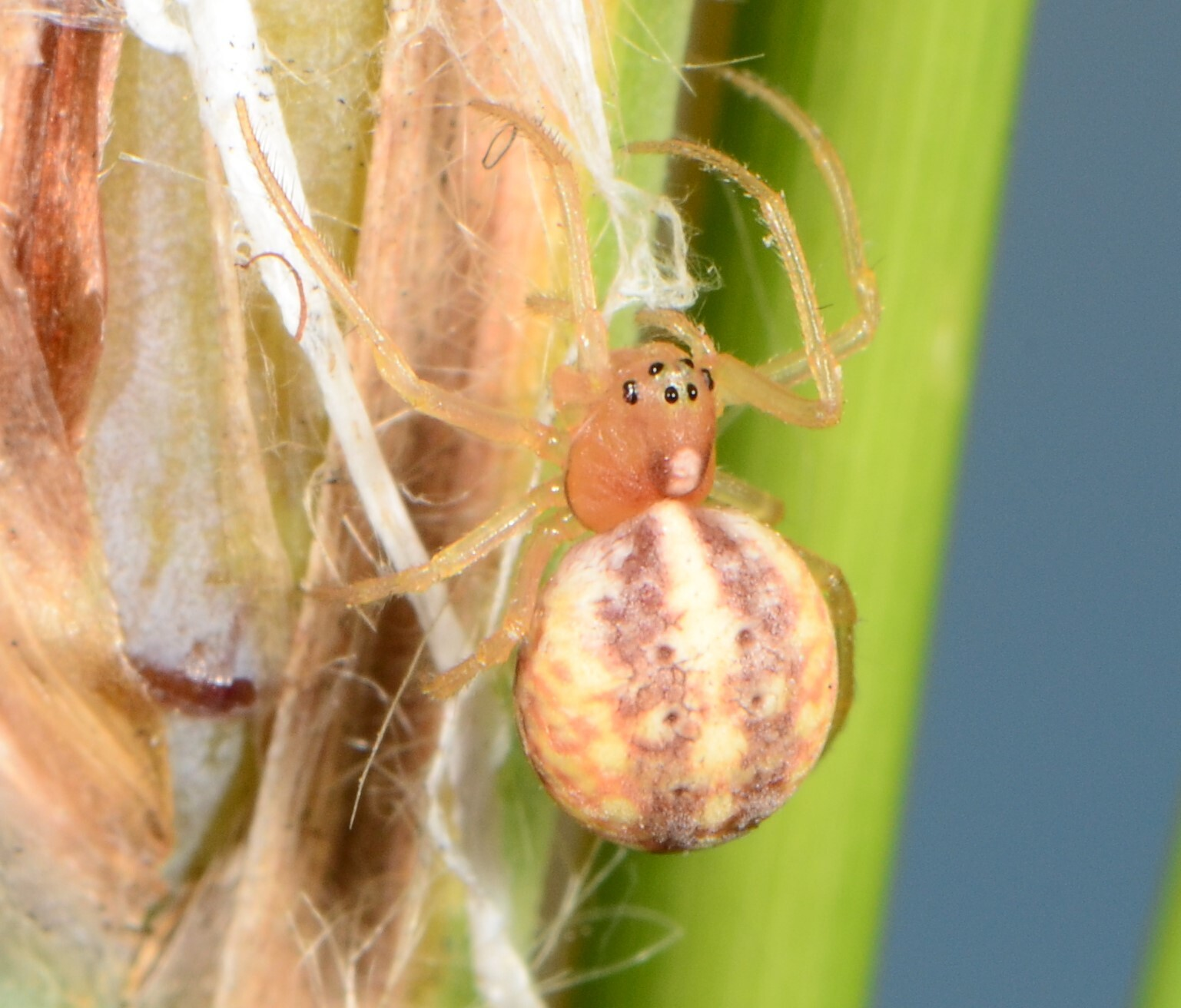
- Female

Scientific classification
- Kingdom: Animalia
- Phylum: Arthropoda
- Subphylum: Chelicerata
- Class: Arachnida
- Order: Araneae
- Infraorder: Araneomorphae
- Family: Araneidae
- Genus: Ursa
- Species: U. turbinata

Binomial name
- Ursa turbinata Simon, 1895

= Ursa turbinata =

Species of spider

Ursa turbinata is a South African species of spider in the family Araneidae.

== Distribution ==
Ursa turbinata is endemic to South Africa. It has been recorded from Gauteng, Limpopo, Mpumalanga, and Western Cape.

== Habitat and ecology ==
The species inhabits altitudes ranging from 34 to 1,328 m above sea level and has been sampled from the Fynbos and Savanna biomes. The behaviour of Ursa turbinata is unknown, with specimens sampled while sweeping grass.

== Description ==
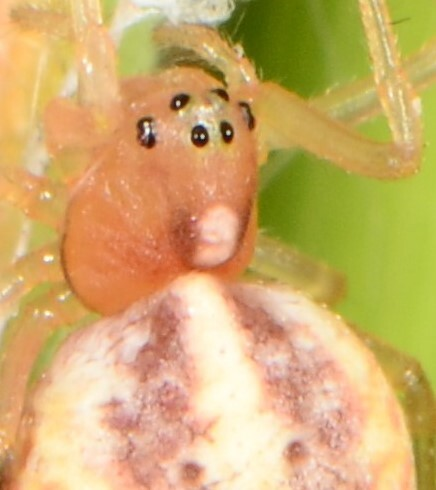
eye pattern

== Conservation ==
Ursa turbinata is listed as Data Deficient for taxonomic reasons by the South African National Biodiversity Institute. Ursa is an uncommon genus that might be listed in the unknowns in most collections, and identification is still problematic. The species is protected in the Blouberg Nature Reserve.

== Taxonomy ==
The species was originally described by Eugène Simon in 1895 from Cape Town in the Western Cape. The species is known only from females.
