= Grief of War =

Japanese death metal band

grief of War
- Origin: Tokyo, Japan
- Genres: Thrash metal Death metal
- Years active: 2002–present
- Labels: Prosthetic Records; Walküre Records
- Members: Manabu Hirose - vocals, bass Masaki - lead/rhythm guitar Yamato – drums
- Website: www.griefofwar.com/

Grief of War is a death / thrash metal band formed in Tokyo, Japan in 2002.

After releasing a 2003 demo, the band's popularity grew in Japan. Following live performances in 2004, they signed to Yggr Drasill. In May 2005, the band released their debut album, A Mounting Crisis...As Their Fury Got Released. The band signed an international deal with Prosthetic Records in 2007, which re-released the album on February 19, 2008. Their second album, Worship, was released in 2009.

== Demo Recordings ==
- Inception (2003)
- Screaming Assault Live! (2004)

== Discography ==
- A Mounting Crisis...As Their Fury Got Released (2005), Yggr Drasill Records
- A Mounting Crisis...As Their Fury Got Released (2008), Prosthetic Records
- Worship (2009), Prosthetic Records
- Act of Treason (2016), Walküre Records
