= Ursini (surname) =

The surname Ursini may refer to:

- Fulvio Orsini or Fulvius Ursini (11 December 1529 – 18 May 1600), an Italian humanist, historian, and archaeologist
- James Ursini (born 1947), a teacher and writer living in Los Angeles
- Toma Ursini (early-17th century), an Archbishop of Antivari, Montenegro

== See also ==
- Ursini (disambiguation)
