= Stabat Mater (Szymanowski) =

Composition by Karol Szymanowski

- by Karol Szymanowski
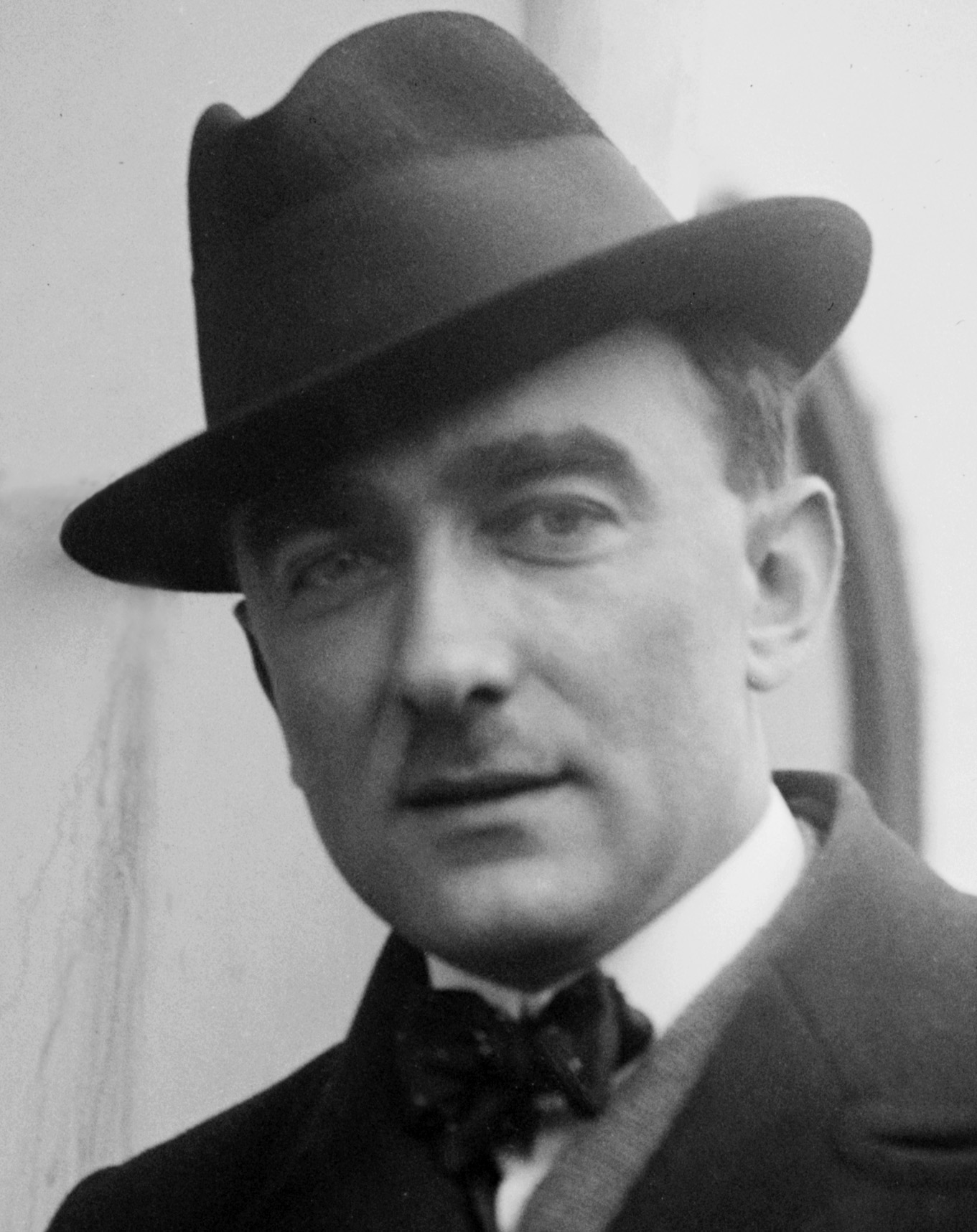
- The composer
- Catalogue: M60
- Opus: 53
- Text: Stała matka bolejąca (Stabat mater dolorosa)
- Language: Polish
- Composed: 1925–1926: Warsaw
- Movements: six
- Vocal: SATB choir; soprano, alto and baritone soloists
- Instrumental: orchestra

Karol Szymanowski's Stała matka bolejąca (Stabat mater dolorosa), Op. 53, was composed in 1925 and 1926. Scored for soprano, alto and baritone soloists, SATB choir and orchestra, it sets Jozef Janowski's Polish translation of the Marian hymn in six movements. His first composition to a liturgical text, it is characteristic of his late period in being partly based on Polish melodies and rhythms; a stay in the Tatras mountains, at Zakopane, in 1922 had led him to describe Polish folk music as "enlivening [in] its proximity to Nature, [in] its force, [in] its directness of feeling, [in] its undisturbed racial purity." Indeed, Szymanowski's use of Polish musical elements together with the Polish translation here is unique.

== Origin and performances ==
In 1924 Princess Edmond de Polignac requested "a piece for soloists, choir, orchestra (perhaps with Polish text): a kind of Polish Requiem." Teresa Chylińska indicates Szymanowski's intentions for the piece in response to the request: "a type of peasant Requiem, something peasant and ecclesiastical, naively devotional, a sort of prayer for souls, a mixture of simple-minded religion, paganism and a certain austere peasant realism." But Szymanowski and the princess lost touch.

Late the same year, however, thoughts about such a composition were revived when Warsaw industrialist Bronisław Krystall asked Szymanowski for a work in memory of his late wife. Circumstances in the composer's own life also served as a catalyst. Upon the death of his niece, Alusia Bartoszewiczówna, in January 1925, the composer spent time consoling his sister, subsequently choosing to set the Stabat mater text, reflecting as it does the "grieving mother." External factors served as motivation too, including financial need, although there is no evidence of the composer receiving compensation for this work.

The Stabat Mater was premiered on January 11, 1929, in Warsaw, conducted by Grzegorz Fitelberg. Its American premiere came two years later at Carnegie Hall, performed by Berthe Erza, Hugh Ross, Nelson Eddy, and others. The score was published by Universal Edition in Vienna.

== Instrumentation ==
Soprano, alto, and baritone soloists; SATB choir; and orchestra consisting of 2 flutes, 2 oboes (2nd doubling cor anglais), 2 clarinets in A, two bassoons (2nd doubling contrabassoon), 4 horns, 2 trumpets, timpani, bass drum, triangle, suspended cymbal, tam-tam, tubular bells, harp, organ (ad lib), and strings consisting of 8 first violins, 8 second violins, 6 violas, 6 cellos, and 4 contrabasses.

== Movements ==
1. Stała Matka bolejąca (Stabat mater dolorosa, verses 1–4) for soprano, SA choir and orchestra
2. I któż widział tak cierpiącą (Quis est homo qui non fleret, verses 5–8) for baritone, SATB choir and orchestra
3. O, Matko źródło wszechmiłości (O eia mater fons amoris, verses 9–12) for soprano, alto, SA choir and orchestra
4. Spraw niech płaczę z Tobą razem (Fac me tecum pie flere, verses 13–14) for soprano, alto and SATB choir unaccompanied
5. Panno słodka racz mozołem (Virgo virginum praeclara, verses 15–18) for baritone, SATB choir and orchestra
6. Chrystus niech mi będzie grodem (Christe cum sit hinc exire, verses 19–20) for soprano, alto, baritone, SATB choir and orchestra

== Polish text ==
Szymanowski chose to set Jozef Janowski's (1865–1935) Polish translation of the Latin Stabat mater text. Though the 13th-century text is already inherently dramatic, this translation is especially raw; Kornel Michałowski suggests that the composer's attraction to it resulted from its "unusually primitive, almost 'folk-like' simplicity and naivety".

The score includes the Latin original for reference only and it notes that the work should always be sung in Polish when performed in Poland. An English translation and commentary on the Polish translation is given in: Belland, Douglas Keith. An examination of the Persichetti, Poulenc, and Szymanowski Stabat Mater settings with pertinent information on the text. Dissertation: University of Cincinnati, 1992.

== Influence of early music ==
Coinciding with his setting of the Stabat Mater was Szymanowski's study of early music, encompassing pre-Palestrinian and Palestrinian periods as well as old Polish religious music. Early-music devices used in the score indicating this study include: parallel movement between voices; modal pitch organization; and strongly patterned rhythms such as ostinati. Also incorporated into the Stabat Mater are melodic elements of two Polish hymns: Święty Boże [Holy God] and Gorzkie żale [Bitter Sorrows].."

== Nationalism and folk music ==
Influenced by composers such as Stravinsky and Bartók, Szymanowski began to incorporate folk music into the work of his late period (after 1922). In the years preceding his setting of the Stabat mater, he kept a notebook of highlanders' melodies or devices encountered in his visits to the Tatra Mountains and later incorporated into his compositions. For example, his use of the Podhalean mode, an ancient Polish folk mode characterized by its raised fourth-scale degree (Lydian), can be heard in the Stabat mater.

== Bibliography ==
- Belland, Douglas Keith. An examination of the Persichetti, Poulenc, and Szymanowski Stabat Mater settings with pertinent information on the text. Dissertation: University of Cincinnati, 1992.
- Chylinska, Teresa. John Glowacki, trans. Karol Szymanowski : his life and works. Los Angeles: University of Southern California, School of Music, 1993
- Howard, Luke. Pan-Slavic parallels between Stravinsky and Szymanowski. Context: A journal of music research, Issue 13, Winter 1997, pp. 15–24. Melbourne: University of Melbourne. ISSN 1038-4006.
- Jeffers, Ron. "Stabat Mater", Translations and Annotations of Choral Repertoire. earthsongs, Corvallis, Oregon: 1988.
- Maciejewski, B. M. Karol Szymanowski: his life and music. London: Poets & Painters' Press, 1967.
- Saffer, Bernard Agnes, Sister. A stylistic analysis of Stabat mater for solo voices, mixed chorus and orchestra by Karol Szymanowski. Dissertation: University of Rochester, 1965.
- Samson, Jim. The music of Szymanowski. New York : Taplinger, 1981.
- Samson, Jim. "Szymanowski, Karol (Maciej)", Grove Music Online ed. L. Macy (Accessed 2/1907), http://www.grovemusic.com
- Szymanowski, Karol. Wightman, Alistair, ed. Szymanowski on music : selected writings of Karol Szymanowski. London: Toccata, 1999.
- Szymanowski, Karol. Karol Szymanowski and Jan Smeterlin; correspondence and essays. London, Allegro Press, 1969.
- Wightman, Alistair. Karol Szymanowski : his life and work. Brookfield, Vermont : Ashgate, 1999.
- Zielinski, R. "Karol Szymanowski (1882–1937): The father of contemporary Polish choral music." Choral Journal No. 46 September 2005, 8–24.
- Karol Szymanowski's "Stabat Mater". Spanish Radio and Television Symphony Orchestra. Thomas Dausgaard, conductor. Live concert.
