= Erzya =

Erzya or Erzia may refer to:

- Erzya language, a Uralic language spoken in Russia
- Erzya literature, literature written in the Erzya language
- Erzyan Mastor, a splinter group from the Mastorava religion
- Erzyan Mastor (journal), an Erzyan- and Russian-language bilingual newspaper
- Erzya people
- Stepan Erzia (1876–1959), Mordvin sculptor who lived in Russia

== See also ==
- Erza (disambiguation)
