= Kari Rueslåtten =

Norwegian singer, songwriter and keyboardist

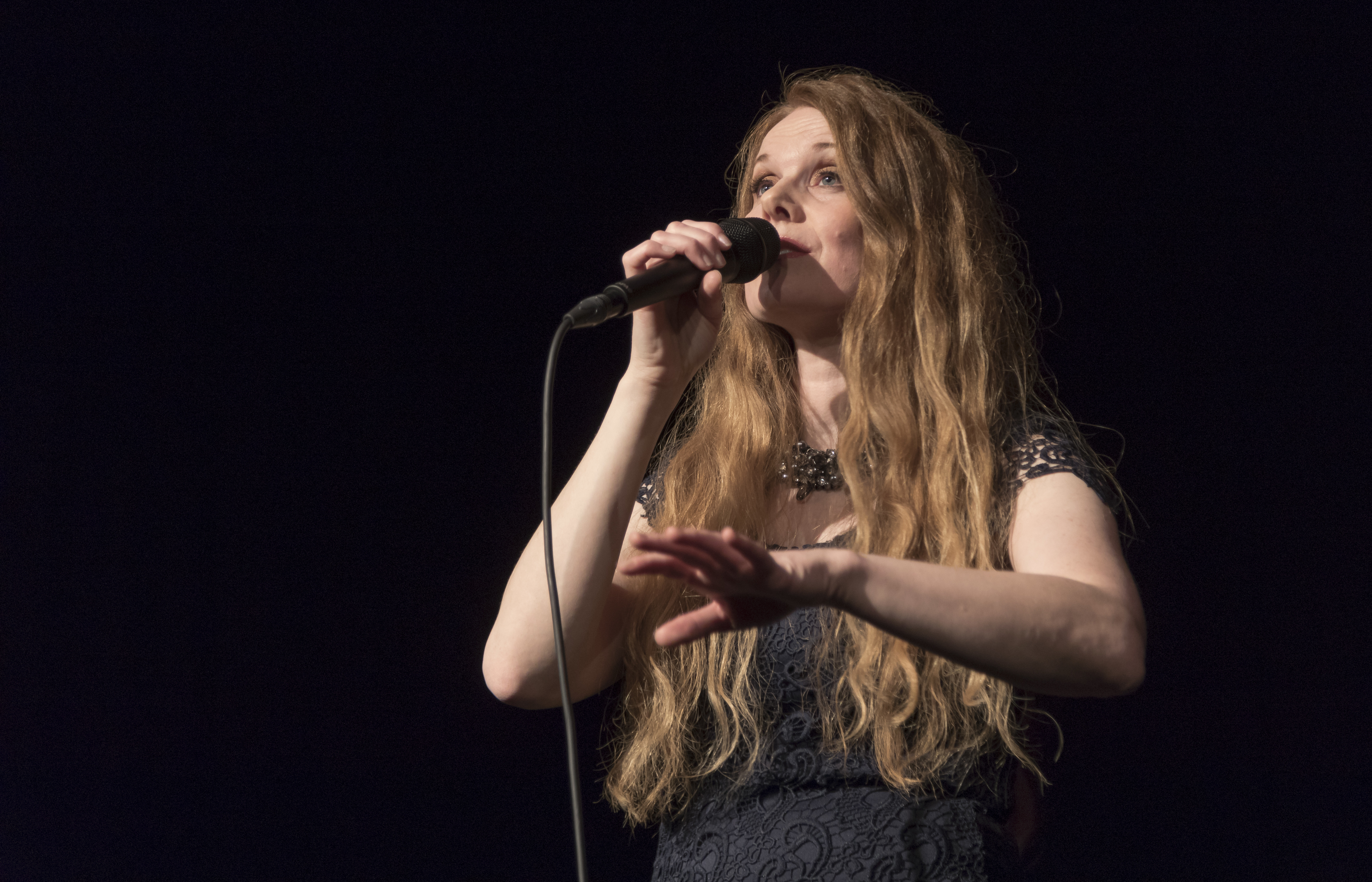
- Kari in São Paulo, Brazil, singing with The Sirens, a project involving fellow vocalists Liv Kristine and Anneke van Giersbergen

Background information
- Born: 3 October 1973 (age 53); Trondheim, Norway
- Genres: Doom metal; progressive metal; indie folk; alternative rock; experimental
- Occupations: Singer; songwriter; professor
- Instruments: Vocals; synthesizer
- Years active: 1992–2005; 2013–present
- Website: www.karirueslatten.com

Kari Rueslåtten (born 3 October 1973) is a Norwegian soprano singer, songwriter and keyboardist, who was well known for being the lead singer and songwriter for the Norwegian doom metal/experimental band, The 3rd and the Mortal. The 3rd and the Mortal was one of the early bands that used a lead female singer in the metal scene, in which inspired bands such as The Gathering, Flowing Tears and Nightwish.

== Musical history ==
=== The 3rd and The Mortal and Storm (1994–1996) ===
Rueslåtten was born in Trondheim on 3 October 1973. After taking part of some local bands, she was only 19 when she joined the cult progressive doom metal band The 3rd and the Mortal with whom she recorded the demo The 3rd and the Mortal in 1993, the EP Sorrow in 1993 and the full-length album Tears Laid in Earth in 1994 through the record label Voices of Wonder. The music was strongly atmospheric mixing progressive and metal elements.

After she left the band, she joined the project Storm and recorded Nordavind before she released her first solo project Demo Recordings; both are styled on Nordic folk music.

=== Solo career and retirement (1997–2005) ===
Spindelsinn, her first official solo album came out in 1997 through Sony Norway, sung entirely in the Norwegian language making honour to the Nordic folk music style. She was nominated for best vocal artist in the Norwegian Grammy Awards as best female artist at the Norwegian Hit-Awards. The following year, her second release Mesmerized came out. A mellower album, with more personal lyrics in which she left the folk-acoustic style in favour of exploring more modern sounds. The singing style is reminiscent in some parts of Tori Amos mixed with her own style.

Tired of relying on producers to get the sounds she wanted for her songs, she decided to study production and went to London, England, for a couple of years. After joining the Swedish label GMR Music Group, Rueslåtten released a comeback album, the experimental Pilot which contains a lot of modern sounds. It bears some resemblance to Björk, but with the more passionate feel which has always characterized Rueslåtten's music. In January 2005, Other People's Stories was issued, showing a simpler side of her music but without losing the modern feel, quality and passion in her performance. At the end of 2005, after performing live in support of her last album, she took a break from her artistic career.

=== Comeback; Time to Tell (2013) ===
In 2013, Rueslåtten made a comeback with the remake of The 3rd and The Mortal's classic "Why So Lonely", featuring Tuomas Holopainen from Nightwish on piano and keyboards, and followed up with the full-length album Time to Tell in 2014, on the Swedish label Despotz Records.

=== To The North (2015) ===
On 22 October 2015, Kari Rueslåtten released her sixth full-length album To The North, fusing the acoustic work of her older releases with the darker atmospheres inspired by her home country of Norway. Singles released from this were a cover of The Byrds 1965 song "Turn, Turn, Turn" (showcasing it in a darker and more melancholic way) and "Battle Forevermore".

=== Silence Is the Only Sound (2017) ===
Released 25 September 2017, Silence Is the Only Sound was Rueslåtten's seventh solo album in English, following up the style and atmospheric sound from To The North. The album spawned the three singles "Chasing Rivers", "Spellbound", and "The Harbour". The second single was an English version of "Spindelsinn" to commemorate the 20th anniversary of her album, also titled Spindelsinn.

=== Sørgekåpe (2020) ===
On 18 February 2020, Rueslåtten announced her ninth full-length album titled Sørgekåpe, her first album in Norwegian since the debut Spindelsinn in 1997. The title track "Sørgekåpe" was released as the album's first single on March 8 to mark the International Women's Day, and featured a music video by the Norwegian director Troll Toftenes shot in the mountains of Dovrefjell.

=== Other works ===
Rueslåtten has also been featured in a handful of drum 'n' bass tracks by the Norwegian duo Rawthang. Her vocals of "Hør Min Sang" (Hear My Song) is also featured on a hardcore record, by Art of Fighters, called "Artwork". This track was included on Dutch hardstyle DJ The Prophet's mixtape titled "Hard 3".

== Discography ==
=== Solo albums ===
- Demo Recordings (1995)
- Spindelsinn (1997)
- Mesmerized (1998)
- Pilot (2002)
- Other People's Stories (2005)
- Time to Tell (2014)
- To the North (2015)
- Silence is the Only Sound (2017)
- Sørgekåpe (2020)

=== With The 3rd and the Mortal ===
- Sorrow (EP, 1994)
- Tears Laid in Earth (1994)

=== With Storm ===
- Nordavind (1995)
