= Ersa (disambiguation) =

Ersa is a figure in Greek mythology.

Ersa may refer to:

- Ersa, Haute-Corse – a commune of the Haute-Corse department of France, on the island of Corsica
- Ersa (moon) - a small moon of Jupiter
- European Regional Science Association (ERSA) – the European section of the Regional Science Association International
- En Route Supplement Australia (ERSA) – part of the Aeronautical Information Publication (AIP) published by Airservices Australia

== See also ==
- Erza (disambiguation)
- Ursa (disambiguation)
