= The Third and the Mortal =

Norwegian metal band

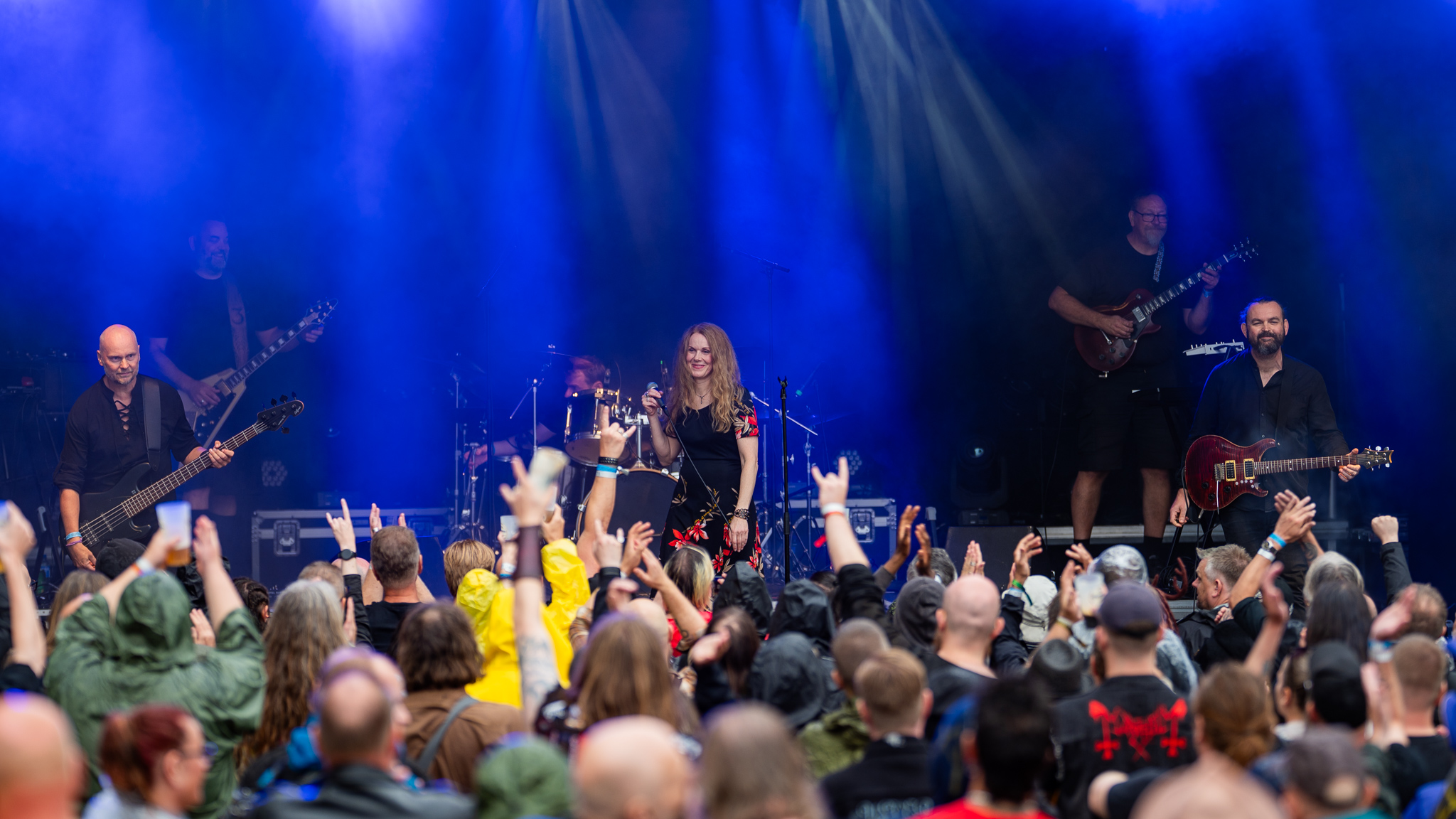
- At Midgardsblot 2025

Background information
- Also known as: The 3rd and the Mortal (1992–1997)
- Origin: Trondheim, Norway
- Genres: Experimental rock, doom metal
- Years active: 1992–2005, 2024–present
- Label: Voices of Wonder
- Members: Kari Rueslåtten; Trond Engum; Finn Olav Holthe; Rune Hoemsnes; Bernt Rundberget
- Past members: Frank Stavem; Andreas Elvenes; Kirsti Huke; Terje Buaas; Jarle Dretvik; Ann-Mari Edvardsen; Sander S. Olsen

The Third and the Mortal are a Norwegian rock band from Trondheim, founded in 1992. The band started out as doom metal, mixing distorted guitars and heavy drumming with clean guitars and vocals from Kari Rueslåtten. The band went on to experiment with genres such as progressive rock, jazz, ambient, folk and electronica.

== History ==
The pre-history of the band began in 1990, then known as Nightfall and playing melodic death metal, consisting of Rune Hoemsnes, Trond Engum, Geir Nilsen and vocalist Terje Buaas.

In 1992, Kari Rueslåtten replaced Buaas and, together with Jarle Dretvik and Finn Olav Holthe, they became The 3rd and the Mortal. Their first EP, Sorrow, was released in 1994 followed by the album Tears Laid in Earth in 1994.

After Rueslåtten's departure in 1995, the band had Ann-Mari Edvardsen join as vocalist. With her, the band released full-length albums Painting on Glass in 1996 and explored an even more experimental sound in 1997 with In This Room. Before In This Room, it was reported that the band's total sales were 50,000.

After the departure of Edvardsen and an absence of five years, the band returned in 2002 with Memoirs, an album with recordings made during previous years. A new female vocalist was found in Kirsti Huke, with Andreas Elvenes backing her up on a couple of tracks. Memoirs differs from previous albums by being more electronic based. After Memoirs, the band played in Mexico City on July 19, 2002, along with eight shows in Germany and the Netherlands during September and October 2002.

In 2004, the band released EPs And Rarities. This is a compilation consisting of the Sorrow and Nightswan EPs, the B-side of the "Stream" single and the bonus track from the Japanese In This Room album. In 2005, the band split up, but not before releasing one last album, Project Bluebook: Decade of Endeavour, a compilation EP with two new studio tracks, another unreleased song performed live in 1998 and four different live versions of Mortal classics recorded on the European tour in 2002.

In late 2024, the band reunited with Kari Rueslåtten ahead of a 2025–2026 tour celebrating the 30th anniversary of the albums Tears Laid in Earth and Sorrow. The first concert announcement was Midgardsblot 2025.

== Band members ==
=== Current ===
- Trond Engum — electric and acoustic guitars (1990–2005, 2024–present)
- Geir Nilsen — electric and acoustic guitars, keyboards, grand piano (1990–2002, 2003–2005, 2024–present)
- Rune Hoemsnes — drums, keyboards, electronic percussion (1990–2005, 2024–present)
- Finn Olav Holthe — electric and acoustic guitars, keyboards (1992–2005, 2024–present)
- Kari Rueslåtten — vocals (1992–1995, 2024–present); keyboards (1992–1995)
- Bernt Rundberget — bass guitar (1993–1999, 2024–present)

=== Former ===
- Kirsti Huke — vocals (2002–2005)
- Terje Buaas — vocals (1990–1992)
- Jarle Dretvik — bass guitar (1992–1993)
- Ann-Mari Edvardsen — vocals, keyboards (1995–1997)
- Sander S. Olsen — keyboards (2002–2003)
- Frank Stavem — bass (2002–2005)
- Andreas Elvenes — vocals (2002–2005)

Timeline

== Discography ==
=== Studio albums ===
- Tears Laid in Earth (1994)
- Painting on Glass (1996)
- In This Room (1997)
- Memoirs (2002)

=== Singles ===
- "Stream" (1996)

=== EPs ===
- Sorrow (1994)
- Nightswan (1995)

=== Demos ===
- The 3rd and the Mortal (1993)

=== Compilations ===
- EP's and Rarities (2004)
- Project Bluebook: Decade of Endeavour (2005)
