= There's Beauty in the Purity of Sadness =

Studio album by Red Harvest
- Released: 1994
- Genre: Industrial metal; doom metal; sludge metal; progressive metal
- Length: 52:27
- Label: Voices of Wonder

Red Harvest chronology
Nomindsland (1992)	There's Beauty in the Purity of Sadness (1994)	Hybreed (1996)

Professional ratings
Review scores
Source	Rating
Rock Hard	7.5/10

There's Beauty in the Purity of Sadness is the second album by industrial metal band Red Harvest. It was released through Voices of Wonder in 1994.

== Track listing ==
1. "Wounds" − 5:24
2. "Naked" − 4:20
3. "Resist" − 4:51
4. "Mindblazt" − 4:35
5. "Mastodome" − 7:53
6. "Shivers" − 2:49
7. "?" − 1:40
8. "Mother of All" − 5:04
9. "a.b.g.l.e.a.k." − 2:37
10. "Sadness" − 5:31
11. "The Art of Radiation" − 7:43
