= Ursa vittigera =

Scientific classification
- Kingdom: Animalia
- Phylum: Arthropoda
- Subphylum: Chelicerata
- Class: Arachnida
- Order: Araneae
- Infraorder: Araneomorphae
- Family: Araneidae
- Genus: Ursa
- Species: U. vittigera

Binomial name
- Ursa vittigera Simon, 1895

Species of spider

Ursa vittigera is a species of spider of the family Araneidae. It is endemic to Sri Lanka.
