= Astroburger =

Norwegian musical group

- Origin: Norway
- Genres: Rock
- Years active: 1987–present
- Label: Perfect Pop
- Members: Geir Stadheim; Per Øystein Lund; Andreas Mastrup; Jan Henning Sørensen; Mats Asvald Innstø
- Past members: Pio Pethon; Helge Waaler; R. C. Thrap-Meyer; Vebjørn Lien; Tage Bjørklid; Kim Nordhuus; Vegard Arnesen; Elisabeth Lyseng; Knut Grønseth; Mikkel Bay Vold; Stein Friling; Rolf Yngve Uggen; Ola Breidal; David Gurrik; Andreas Grøtterud
- Website: astroburger.no

Astroburger is a Norwegian rock band founded in 1987 by Geir Stadheim, Helge Waaler, and R. C. Thrap-Meyer. Geir Stadheim remains the central creative force in the group and is the only original member still part of the band.

== Personnel ==
=== Current members ===
- Geir Stadheim (1987 – present) – vocal, guitar
- Per Øystein Lund (1997 – present) – bass, guitar
- Andreas Mastrup (2005 – present) – bass
- Jan Henning Sørensen (2008 – present) – drums
- Mats Asvald Innstø (2013 – present) – organ, synth

=== Past members ===
- Pio Pethon (1995 – 2012) – drums
- David Gurrik (1989 – 2002) – organ
- Andreas Grøtterud (1990 – 2004) – guitar, bass
- Vebjørn Lien (1987 – 1987) – bass
- Tage Bjørklid (1987 – 1987) – drums
- Kim Nordhuus (1988 – 1988) – keyboard
- R.C. Thrap-Meyer (1987 – 1989) – bass
- Vegard Arnesen (1989 – 1989) – bass
- Elizabeth Lyseng (1989 – 1989) – guitar
- Helge Waaler (1987 – 1992) – guitar, bass
- Knut Grønseth (1988 – 1994) – drums, cake
- Mikkel Bay Vold (1989 – 1995) – bass
- Stein Friling (1994 – 1995) – drums
- Rolf Yngve Uggen (1992 – 1997) – guitar
- Ola Breidal (1995 – 2001) – bass

== Discography ==
=== Singles ===
- 1988 She's a girl 7´
- 1990 Finally arrives 7´
- 1993 Pinboing wizard 7´ (Mongoloid)
- 1996 Get with it 7´

=== CDs/LPs ===
- 1991 Venus Beach/Lost on Venus Split-LP Astroburger/Monsters Of Doom (The Tables)
- 1992 I Used to be Mod
- 1992 Beyond the Valley of Astroburger (The vinyl version of "I Used to be Mod")
- 1994 In Orbit
- 1996 Stand on It
- 1997 Quite Obscure and Practically Marzipan [compilation of oddities]
- 1999 Inferno in Fano
- 2002 Equalize It
- 2006 They Came from the Sun
- 2013 Lightyears behind

=== The Year of Singles, 2001 ===
- 2001 2001 – A Pop Odyssey:

"Golden Falcon"/"A For Astro – B For Burger"
"Norman the Poet's Christmas Carol"/"2001 – A Pop Odyssey Theme"
"Popdown"/"Always a Route Through the Galaxies of My Mind"/"Rescue"
"Low"/"Stars Burning Out"/"The Mess You Left Behind"
"Edwin the Idiot"/"Supernova"
"The Horse"/"The Midget Walk"
"All Night Long"/"Schwarzwald"
"We Came For You"/"Congo"
"As the Fury Turns"/"Urban Guerilla"
"She Wants to Be Someone"/"The Pavilion"
"Southern Sky"/"Yellow"
"This Is Gonna Save You"/"Timothy Modhead"

=== Compilations ===
- 1992 Shit! Too Early: "Lada 1500" and "Dreaming"(Blondie cover)
- 1992 Penguins and Bondage: "I Want to Be Alone"
- 199? She Didn't Even Draw a Fish on My Shower Curtain: "You Put the Name of Rock and Roll in Vain"
- 1994 A Perfect Pop Compilation 1991-1994: "Story of a Girl" and "Feed that Monster"
- 1996 Ellediller & Krokofanter: "Sov Godt"
- 2001 Bestrummed! Perfect Pop 1995-2001: "Afford to Lose"
- 2004 Last Train Oslo Presents: No Music Requests: "Manhole 69", "Live I Normandie"
- 2006 Mange Motstandere – Ingen Motstand (En hyllest til Vålerenga): "Laget Vårt"
