= Ezra (disambiguation) =

Ezra is a figure from the Hebrew Bible.

Ezra may also refer to:

== People ==
- Ezra (name), including a list of people with either the given name or surname, among them:
  - George Ezra, stage name of British singer-songwriter George Ezra Barnett (born 1993)
  - Ezra Charles, stage name of American jump blues pianist Charles Helpinstill Jr. (born 1944)
  - Ezra Miller, an American actor
  - Ezra Pound, an American critic and poet

== Arts and entertainment ==
- Better Than Ezra, an American rock band
- Ezra (2007 film), a Nigerian film
- Ezra (2017 film), an Indian film
- Ezra (2023 film), an American film
- Ezra the Mad, a character in the Night Angel Trilogy
- Ezra Bridger, a character on the TV series Star Wars Rebels and Ahsoka
- Ezra Fitzgerald, a character in the American TV series Pretty Little Liars as well as the books of the same title by Sara Shepard
- Ezra, a character in CBeebies TV show JoJo & Gran Gran
- Ezra Banks, a character in The InBESTigators, an Australian children's programme

== Places ==
- Ezra, Alabama, US, an unincorporated community northwest of Bessemer, Alabama
- Ezra, Tel Aviv, Israel, a neighborhood; see Neighborhoods of Tel Aviv

== Other uses ==
- Ezra Cup, an Indian polo tournament
- The biblical Book of Ezra

== See also ==
- Ezrah, a minor Biblical figure
- Esdras, Greek or Latin spelling of Ezra
- ESRA (disambiguation), acronym
- Erza (disambiguation)
