= Novembre (band) =

Italian gothic metal band

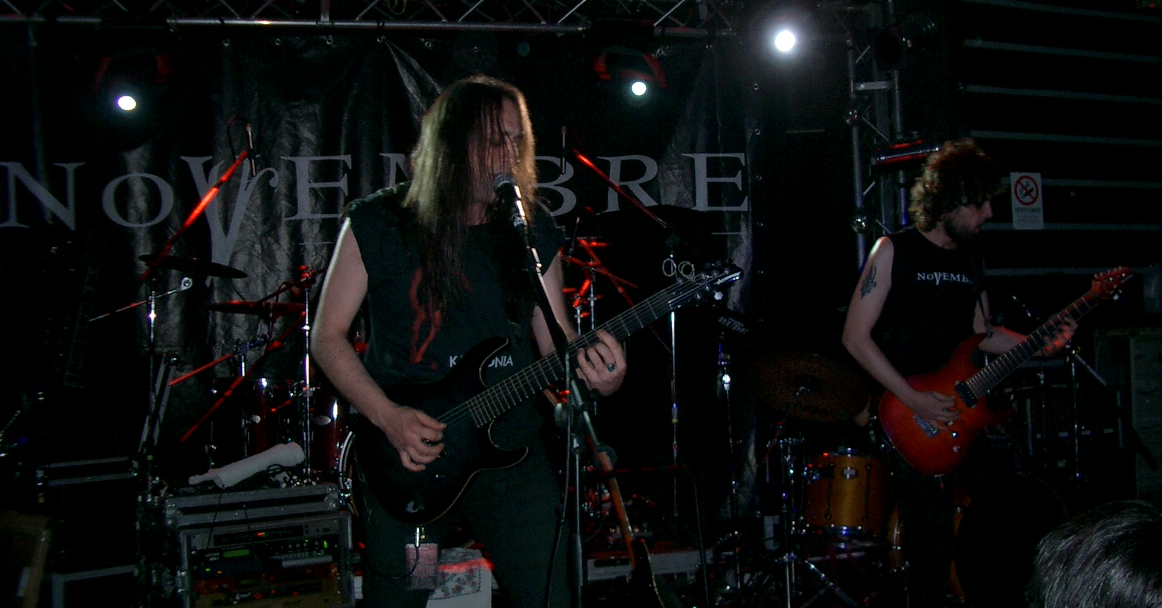
- Novembre performing in 2006

Background information
- Origin: Catania, Sicily, Italy
- Genres: Gothic metal, progressive metal, death-doom
- Years active: Since 1990
- Label: Peaceville
- Members: Carmelo Orlando; Massimiliano Pagliuso; Fabio Fraschini; David Folchitto
- Past members: Luca Giovagnoli; Alessandro Niola; Fabio Vignati; Giuseppe Orlando; Valerio Di Lella
- Website: novembre.co.uk

Novembre (Italian for "November") is an Italian gothic metal band formed in Rome in 1990.

== History ==
Starting in 1990 as a death metal band called Catacomb in Catania, Novembre developed an atmospheric sound. Although most of their lyrics are in English, vocalist Carmelo Orlando sings in Italian occasionally in many of their songs. They released their first two albums, Wish I Could Dream It Again and Arte Novecento, through Italian label Polyphemus. While Wish I Could Dream It Again displays the band's death-doom roots, Arte Novecento has a softer, cleanly-sung sound.

In the mid-1990s, they signed with Century Media to release their next three albums, Classica, Novembrine Waltz, and Dreams d'Azur. Later, Novembre signed to Peaceville Records to release their sixth album, Materia, which featured a progressive rock influence, and their seventh album, The Blue, a return to death metal-esque passages.

After nearly nine years, Novembre completed a new studio album, released on Peaceville Records on 1 April 2016, called Ursa. Simultaneously, it was announced that drummer and co-founder Giuseppe Orlando left the band, leaving Carmelo Orlando as the only original member. After another nine years, Novembre released their ninth studio album, Words of Indigo, on 7 November 2025.

== Band members ==
Current members

- Carmelo Orlando – guitar, vocals, keyboards (since 1990)
- Massimiliano Pagliuso – guitar (since 1997)
- Fabio Fraschini – bass guitar (2002–2007, since 2015)
- Yuri Croscenko (since 2022)

Past members

- Fabio Vignati – bass guitar (1993–1999, died 2014)
- Antonio Poletti – guitars (1993–1997, 2002)
- Alessandro Niola – bass guitar (1999–2001)
- Demian Cristiani – bass guitar (2001–2002)
- Luca Giovagnoli – bass guitar (2007–2008)
- Valerio Di Lella – bass guitar (2008)
- Giuseppe Orlando – drums (1990–2015)
- David Folchitto – drums (2015)
- Thomas Negrini – keyboards (1994)

Timeline

== Discography ==
Albums

- Wish I Could Dream It Again (Polyphemus, 1994)
- Arte Novecento (Polyphemus, 1996)
- Classica (Century Media, 2000)
- Novembrine Waltz (Century Media, 2001)
- Dreams d'Azur (Century Media, 2002)
- Materia (Peaceville, 2006)
- The Blue (Peaceville, 2007)
- URSA (Peaceville, 2016)
- Words of Indigo (Peaceville, 2025)

Singles

- "Memoria Stoica" (Peaceville, 2006)
