= Red Harvest (band) =

Norwegian industrial metal band

- Origin: Oslo, Norway
- Genres: Industrial metal; thrash metal (early)
- Years active: 1989–2010, 2015–present
- Labels: Season of Mist
- Members: Jim Bergsten; Thomas Brandt; Ketil Eggum; Lars Sørensen; Erik Wroldsen
- Past members: Cato Bekkevold; Jan Nygaard
- Website: redharvest.com

Red Harvest is a Norwegian industrial metal band from Oslo. Their 2002 album Sick Transit Gloria Mundi was nominated for a Norwegian Grammy (Spellemannprisen) and an alternative Grammy in the "Best Metal Album" category. Formed in 1989, they have released eight albums, two EPs, one live DVD, a split album with Zyklon, and a compilation album.

== History ==
Formed in 1989 as a Slayer tribute band, the band released their first demo Ocultica that year, followed up by a second, Psychotica, before releasing their debut album Nomindsland in 1992, which had distinctly thrash metal influences and aesthetics. From 1994, the band moved towards an experimental hybrid of progressive metal, gothic rock, industrial, and doom metal on There's Beauty in the Purity of Sadness, which spawned a video for the opening track "Wounds", gaining the band exposure on MTV despite its violent imagery. 1995's The Maztürnation and 1996's HyBreed allowed the band to reach a wider audience, resulting in them opening for American gothic metal act Type O Negative on their European tour in 1997.

In 1998, they released an EP entitled New Rage World Music, which was re-released in 2001 and contains the original EP track list from 1998 and four bonus tracks with minor alterations under the reworked title of New World Rage Music. After the original EP release, the band perfected their progressive industrial-tinged sound, and their follow-up Cold Dark Matter album was released in 2000. In 2002, Sick Transit Gloria Mundi was nominated for a Spellemannprisen, the Norwegian equivalent of a Grammy Award and an alternative Grammy in the "Best Metal Album" category. In 2004, Red Harvest released the Harvest Bloody Harvest DVD and the album Internal Punishment Programs. The band released A Greater Darkness in early 2007. In 2008, they released The Redline Archives, a compilation album of various remixes and alternate versions of previously released tracks along with a number of unreleased songs.

From New Rage World Music to Internal Punishment Programs, their sound drew elements from industrial metal bands such as Godflesh and Ministry, the experimental doom of Neurosis, Voivod, Voivod-influenced progressive thrash metal, fellow Norwegian black metal bands like Emperor and Darkthrone, and certain styles of electronica, such as drum'n'bass, industrial, and gabber. As of 2007, they have largely retained these influences, but have moved towards a slightly slower and more organic style as evidenced by songs like "Hole in Me" from A Greater Darkness, though they still retain their ability to throw up-tempo numbers into the fray.

The band played a show on 24 October 2009 in Oslo, the band's home city, to mark the twentieth anniversary of the band's formation.

According to their official website, Red Harvest disbanded in May 2010, stating no specific reasons for the breakup. They eventually reformed 5 years later in 2015.

== Members ==
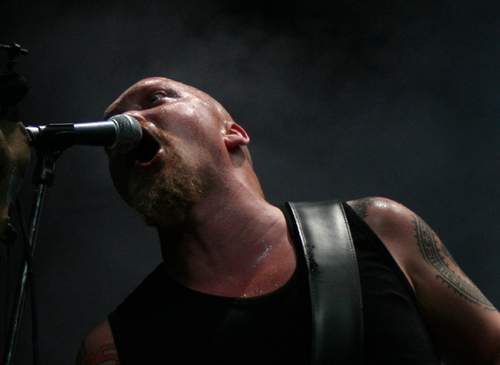
Vocalist Ofu Kahn

- Jimmy "Ofu Kahn" Ivan Bergsten – guitars, vocals
- Thomas Brandt – bass
- Kjetil "TurboNatas" Eggum – guitars
- Lars "LRZ" Sørensen – samples, programming and synths
- Erik Wroldsen – drums

=== Past members ===
- Cato Bekkevold – drums 1989–1997
- Jan Nygaard – guitars 1989–1994

== Discography ==
=== EPs and demos ===
- Ocultica (demo, 1989)
- Psychotica (demo, 1990)
- The Maztürnation (EP, 1995)
- New Rage World Music (EP, 1998)

=== Studio albums ===
- Nomindsland (1992)
- There's Beauty in the Purity of Sadness (1994)
- HyBreed (1996)
- Cold Dark Matter (2000)
- New World Rage Music (2001)
- Sick Transit Gloria Mundi (2002)
- Internal Punishment Programs (2004)
- A Greater Darkness (2007)

=== Compilations ===
- The Red Line Archives (2008)

=== Splits ===
- Zyklon / Red Harvest (2003)

=== Videos ===
- Harvest Bloody Harvest (DVD, 2006)
