= Levitation discography =

- Studio albums: 2
- Extended plays: 3
- Live albums: 1
- Compilation albums: 3
- Singles: 7

Levitation were an English rock band fronted by ex-House of Love guitarist Terry Bickers. Levitation's music and attitude challenged an early 1990s UK alternative music scene dominated by shoegazing and Madchester.

== Albums ==
List of albums, with selected chart positions
Title	Album details	Peak chart positions
Title	Album details	UK
Coterie	Released: 19 November 1991; Label: Capitol; Format: CD, LP, cassette; Note: Compilation	—
Need for Not	Released: 4 May 1992; Label: Rough Trade; Format: CD, LP, cassette	45
Demos 1989–1991	Released: November 1992; Format: Cassette; Note: Compilation	—
Live at Reading University	Released: November 1992; Format: Cassette; Note: Live album	—
Meanwhile Gardens	Released: 1994; Label: Festival; Format: CD	—
Meanwhile Gardens (with Terry Bickers)	Released: 23 October 2015; Label: Festival; Format: CD, LP, digital	—

== Extended plays ==
List of EPs, with selected details
Title	Details
Coppelia	Released: April 1991; Label: Ultimate; Format: CD
After Ever	Released: August 1991; Label: Ultimate; Format: CD
Never Odd or Even	Released: 18 April 2015; Label: Flashback; Format: CD

== Singles ==
List of singles, with selected chart positions
Title	Year	Peak chart positions	Album
Title	Year	AUS	Album
"Nadine"/"Smile"	1991	—	Coppelia
"Firefly"/"Attached"	1991	—	After Ever
"Squirrel"/"It's Time"	1991	—	Coterie
"World Around"	1992	95	Need for Not
"Even When Your Eyes Are Open"	1993	—	Meanwhile Gardens
"King of Mice"	1994	—	Meanwhile Gardens
"Chain by Day"	1994	—	Meanwhile Gardens

== Radio sessions ==
- Radio 5, "The Mix" 10 June 1991, "Against Nature", "Firefly", "Rosemary Jones", "Bedlam".
- Radio 1, Mark Goodier's Evening Session May 1992 "Resist", "Pieces of Mary", "Evergreen", "Hangnail"
- Radio 1, Mark Goodier's Evening Session July 1992 "Sacred Lover", "Hieronymous Bop" (Terry and Bob playing acoustically).
