= Esra Dalfidan =

Turkish-German jazz singer

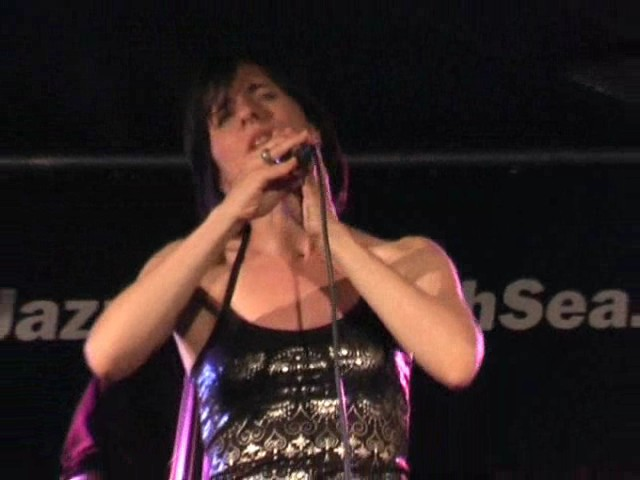
- At North Sea Jazz Festival, July 11, 2008, Rotterdam

Background information
- Born: 20 April 1975 (age 49); Solingen, West Germany (now Germany)
- Genres: Vocal jazz
- Occupation: Singer
- Years active: 2004–present
- Labels: Challenge
- Website: esradalfidan.com

Esra Dalfidan is a Turkish-German jazz singer.

== Career ==
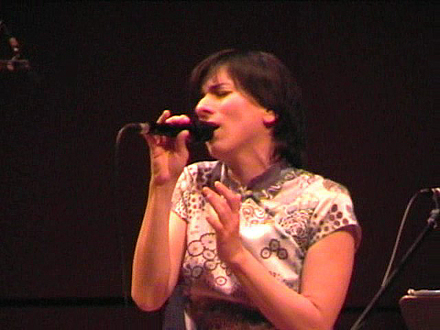
With Gandhi Bazaar at the National Museum of Ethnology, Leiden (30 November 2008)

Dalfidan was born in 1975 to Turkish parents and raised in the German industrial town of Solingen. After a brief career as a music therapist, she attended Amsterdam Conservatory in 2006. With classmates she started FIDAN, a band that combined jazz with folk music from Turkey and Azerbaijan. Dalfidan sings lyrics in English, German, and Turkish. The band's name comes from the Turkish word for twig or branch. As her main influences and source of inspiration she mentions the Azeri singer and pianist Aziza Mustafa Zadeh and the Portuguese singer Maria João. Zadeh developed a blend of jazz, modern, and Azeri traditional music called mugam jazz.

In 2008 she performed a series of concerts with the Tineke Postma Group, extending into the first half of 2009. She worked with an ensemble called Gandhi Bazaar led by Ned McGowan. This group assembled five musicians with backgrounds in jazz, classical, Indian, Turkish, and flamenco music. The Gandhi Bazaar concert tour was commissioned by the Dutch Fund for the Performing Arts and some of the compositions were created to accompany texts by the Dutch-Iranian poet Nafiss Nia.

== Awards and honors ==
- Jugend Musiziert, 1991
- Winner, 7th Dutch Vocalists Concours, 2007
- Finalist, Deloitte Jazz Award 2008

== Discography ==
- Colors (Challenge, 2008)
- CounterPoint (Challenge, 2010)
