= Ursus =

Ursus is Latin for bear. It may also refer to:

== Animals ==
- Ursus (mammal), a genus of bears

== People ==
- Ursus of Aosta, 6th-century evangelist
- Ursus of Auxerre, 6th-century bishop
- Ursus of Ravenna, 5th-century bishop
- Ursus of Solothurn, 3rd-century martyr
- Ursus, praefectus urbi of Constantinople in 415-416
- Ursus, count of Tivoli probably in the 9th century and supposed ancestor of the aristocratic Orsini family
- Reimarus Ursus, an astronomer and imperial mathematician to Rudolf II
- Ursus, a pen-name of Ambrose Bierce

=== Fictional characters ===
- Ursus, the bodyguard of Ligia, a minor character in the novel Quo Vadis
- Ursus, a character in Victor Hugo's novel The Man Who Laughs
- General Ursus (Planet of the Apes), a character in Beneath the Planet of the Apes
- Ursus (film character), a character in a series of 1960s Italian adventure films

== Arts ==
- Ursus (film), 1961 Italian film

== Science and technology ==
- Ursus (journal), a scientific journal published by the International Association for Bear Research and Management
- Ursus Factory, Polish manufacturer of heavy vehicles
  - Ursus A, a series of Polish lorries and buses from the 1920s
  - The Ursus, or Samochód pancerny wz. 29, a model of Polish armored car

== Others ==
- Ursus (beer), a Romanian beer
- Ursus (vodka), an Icelandic vodka
- Ursus, Warsaw, a borough of Warsaw, Poland

== See also ==
- Ursa (disambiguation)
