= Berthe Erza =

French soprano singer (1920s/1930s)

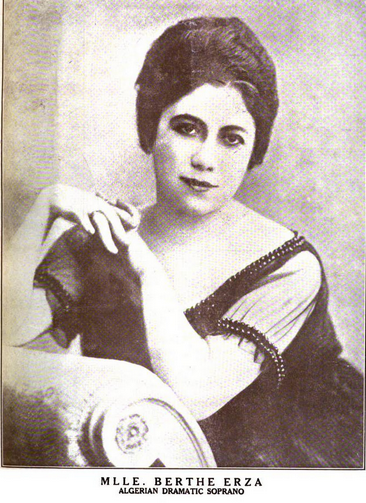
- Berthe Erza in 1922
- Born: Algiers, Algeria
- Occupation: Singer
- Years active: 1920s–death

Berthe Erza was a French soprano singer.

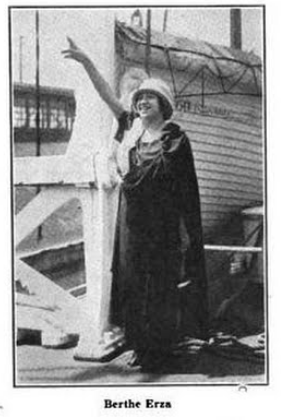
Berthe Erza, from a 1922 publication

== Early life ==
Erza was born to French parents in Algiers. She studied voice in Italy and France. In 1920, she moved to the United States with her vocal coach, Isidore Braggiotti (father of dancer Francesca Braggiotti).

== Career ==
Erza was a featured singer with the Pasdeloup Orchestra in Paris conducted by Rhené-Baton, and spent three seasons with the Concerts Classiques of Monte Carlo. In 1921 she sang at a concert to benefit a French village, Misery-sur-Somme, after World War I. She made an "American debut" in July 1921, then her "formal debut" in America, at the Aeolian Hall in New York City in 1922, and had another New York concert billed as a "debut" in 1930, at the Biltmore Theatre. The New York Times called her "a well-schooled musician with a flair for the exotic" in 1931. She sang at Carnegie Hall later that year, sharing the stage with Hugh Ross and the chorus of the Schola Cantorum, Nelson Eddy, and others, for the American premiere of Karol Szymanowski's Stabat Mater.

She made at least two recordings for Victor in 1920. She taught vocal music in Brooklyn in the 1930s at the Chase School, on the same music faculty as composer Harrison Kerr.
