= URSA (album) =

Studio album by Novembre
- Released: 1 April 2016
- Recorded: 2014–2015
- Studio: Blue Noise Studios, Rome; PlayRec Studio, Rome; Unisound Studios, Örebro
- Genre: Progressive metal; melodic death metal; death-doom; gothic metal
- Length: 64:55
- Label: Peaceville

Novembre chronology
The Blue (2007)	URSA (2016)

Professional ratings
Review scores
Source	Rating
Sputnikmusic	4.0/5
Truemetal	80/100

URSA is the eighth studio album by the band Novembre. Although the album title is spelled in lowercase on the cover art and some websites, it is actually an acronym which stands for "Union des Républiques Socialistes Animales", the original title for the French translation of the novel Animal Farm by George Orwell. Katatonia guitarist Anders Nyström contributed to the track "Annoluce".

== Track listing ==
All lyrics are written by Carmelo Orlando, except for "Umana", which is by Jiddu Krishnamurti; all music is composed by Orlando.

No.	Title	Length
1.	"Australis"	7:37
2.	"The Rose"	5:30
3.	"Umana"	5:49
4.	"Easter"	5:03
5.	"URSA"	5:50
6.	"Ocean of Afternoons"	6:22
7.	"Annoluce"	3:21
8.	"Agathae"	9:23
9.	"Bremen"	6:17
10.	"Fin"	7:18
Total length:		64:55

== Personnel ==
Novembre

- Carmelo Orlando – guitar, vocals
- Massimiliano Pagliuso – guitar, recording
- Fabio Fraschini – bass guitar
- David Folchitto – drums

Additional personnel

- Riccardo Studer – keyboards, programming
- Tatiana Ronchetti – vocals (track 6)
- Paolo Sapia – saxophone (track 6)
- Anders Nyström – guitar solo (track 7)
- Dan Swanö – mixing, mastering
- Travis Smith – cover art
