= Esra Battaloğlu =

Turkish geneticist

- Education: Middle East Technical University (BS); Boğaziçi University (MS, PhD)
- Scientific career
- Fields: Human genetics
- Workplaces: Boğaziçi University

Esra Battaloğlu is a Turkish geneticist researching the human genetics of inherited peripheral neuropathies. She is a professor at Boğaziçi University.

== Education ==
Battaloğlu graduated from the High School TED Ankara Koleji in 1982. She completed a B.S. in the department of biology at the Middle East Technical University in 1986. Battaloğlu earned an M.S. (1989) and Ph.D. (1992) in the department of biology at Boğaziçi University.

== Career and research ==
In September 1993, she joined the faculty at Boğaziçi University as an assistant professor in the department of molecular biology and genetics. She researches the human genetics of inherited peripheral neuropathies.
