= European Safety and Reliability Association =

European Safety and Reliability Association (ESRA), according to its charter, "is a non-profit international association for the advance and application of safety and reliability technology in all areas of human endeavour. It is an "umbrella" organisation with a membership consisting of: national professional societies, industrial organisations and higher education institutions. The common interest is safety and reliability." Its members include various professional associations, companies and educational and research institutions in 22 countries, including the Safety and Reliability Society in the UK, as well as 7 national chapters (for countries with at least 5 direct members). It was launched as a permanent entity in 1986.

ESRA supports the Reliability Engineering and System Safety Journal published by Elsevier. It also sponsors other publications, including newsletters, monographs, conference proceedings and technical documentation. It also endorses the International Journal of Quality & Reliability Management.

ESREL is a generic name of annual conferences held by ESRA since 1992.

The September ESREL conference plans to discuss the merger of the ESRA and Society of Risk Analysis-Europe.
