= A Mounting Crisis...As Their Fury Got Released =

Studio album by Grief of War
- Released: 25 May 2005
- Genre: Thrash metal
- Length: 44:58
- Label: Prosthetic

A Mounting Crisis...As Their Fury Got Released, released on May 25, 2005 by Yggr Drasill Records, is a full-length album by thrash metal band Grief of War. It was re-released on February 19, 2008 through Prosthetic Records. Invisible Oranges described the album as having "old-school flavor".

== Track listing ==
1. "Hatred Burns" – 4:21
2. "Rat Race" – 5:11
3. "Sown By Greed" – 4:23
4. "Don't Walk Away" – 4:35
5. "Distrust" – 3:35
6. "Eternal Curse" – 4:50
7. "Blind from the Facts" – 6:25
8. "Resist" – 2:07
9. "Blood Lust" – 2:51
10. "The Judgement Day" – 6:17
