= New World Rage Music =

Studio album by Red Harvest
- Released: 2001
- Genre: Industrial metal
- Length: 34:45
- Label: Nocturnal Art Productions

Red Harvest chronology
| Cold Dark Matter (2000) | New World Rage Music (2001) | Sick Transit Gloria Mundi (2002) |

New World Rage Music is the fifth album by industrial metal band Red Harvest. It was released in 2001, but was originally released in 1998 as an EP titled New Rage World Music.

== Track listing ==
Studio Album
| No. | Title | Length |
|---|---|---|
| 1. | "Intrusion" | 1:40 |
| 2. | "Ad Noctum" | 3:47 |
| 3. | "Move or Be Moved (Preview)" | 3:32 |
| 4. | "Swallow the Sun" | 3:49 |
| 5. | "Pity the Bastard" | 2:34 |
| 6. | "Final Scorn" | 3:55 |
| 7. | "Absolute Dunkel:Heit" | 4:01 |
| 8. | "The Supreme Truth" | 6:44 |
| 9. | "Terrorsonic Zoidiac" | 4:09 |
