= Ursine =

Ursine may refer to:

- Of, pertaining to, or characteristic of bears
  - List of ursids
- Ursine, Nevada, a place in the US
