= Erza McKenzie Round Barn =

- U.S. National Register of Historic Places
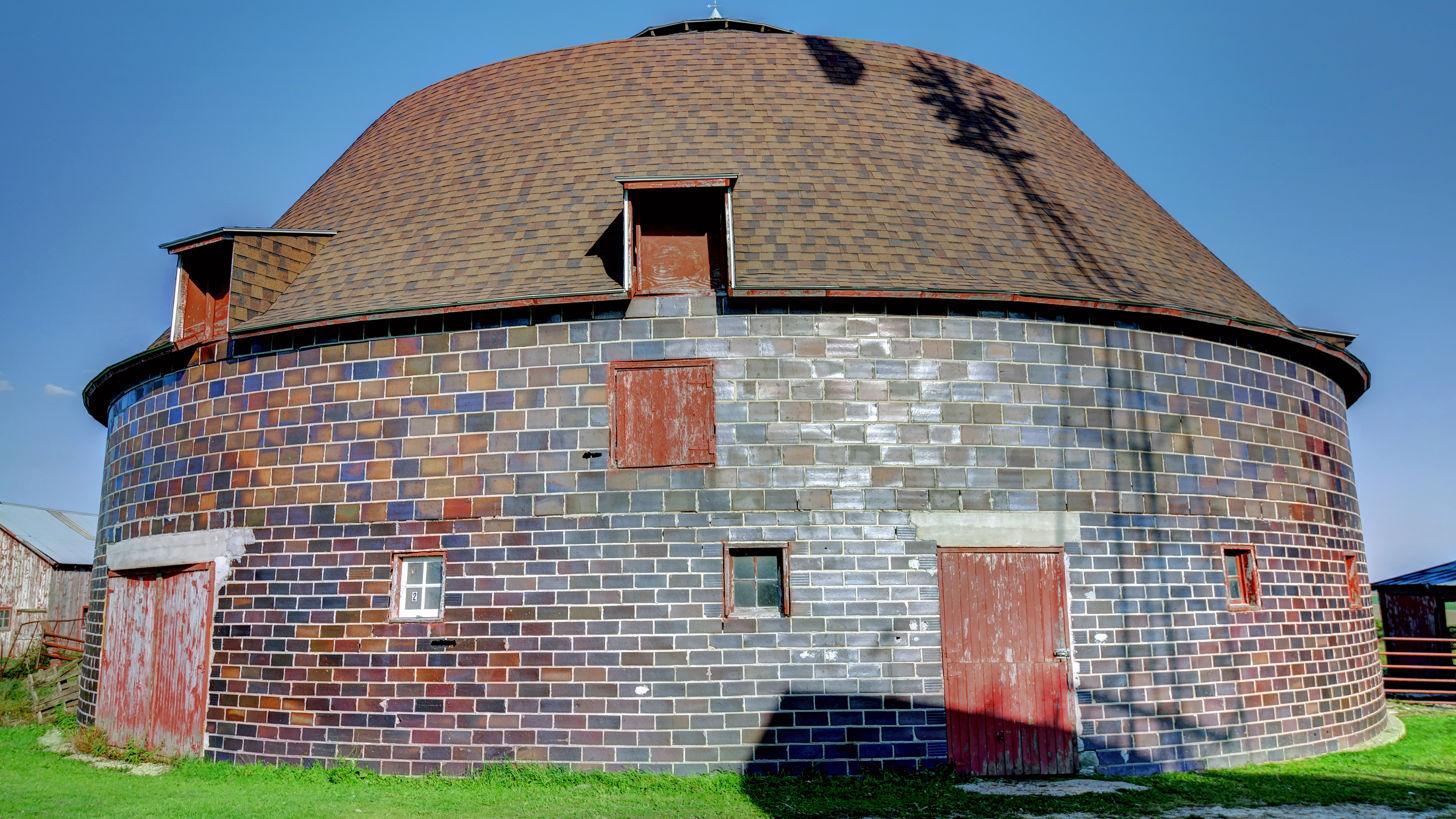

- Location within Iowa Location within the United States
- Location: Off Iowa Highway 150
- Nearest city: Hazleton, Iowa
- Coordinates: 42°36′26″N 91°56′7″W
- Area: less than one acre
- Built: 1922
- Built by: Erza McKenzie
- MPS: Iowa Round Barns: The Sixty Year Experiment TR
- NRHP reference No.: 86001419
- Added to NRHP: June 30, 1986

The Erza McKenzie Round Barn is a historic building located near Hazleton in rural Buchanan County, Iowa, United States. It was built in 1922 by Erza McKenzie for a dairy barn. The building is a true round barn that measures 70 feet (21 m) in diameter. The barn is constructed of clay tile and features small cupolas on the west, southwest and south sides of the structure. The building features a two-pitch roof and a central silo. It has been listed on the National Register of Historic Places since 1986.
