= Resist (book) =

2024 non-fiction book by Rita Omokha

Resist: How a Century of Young Black Activists Shaped America
- Author: Rita Omokha
- Language: English
- Subject: History, African American History, Trayvon Martin, Black Panther Party
- Genre: Nonfiction
- Publisher: St. Martin's Press
- Publication date: November 19, 2024
- Publication place: United States
- Pages: 352
- ISBN: 978-1-250-29098-4 (Hardcover)
- Website: us.macmillan.com/books/9781250290984/resist

Resist: How a Century of Young Black Activists Shaped America is a non-fiction book by journalism professor Rita Omokha that discusses the roots of activism by young Black people in America.

== Summary ==
Resist explores how young activists shaped the past hundred years of America's history and describes their contributions to social justice movements.

In an excerpt in Teen Vogue, Omokha said of the book

I trace a century of Black youth activism, from early organizers like Ella Baker in the 1920s to Barbara Johns and Charlie Cobb in the 1950s and 1960s, respectively, to the first glimpses of allyship in The Bates Seven and The Wilmington Ten, all the way to today's generation and the continued fight against police violence and racial injustice. Resist examines this longstanding tradition of student mobilization, a force with far-reaching consequences for this nation. It argues that youth activism is the lifeblood of American democracy, the very essence of the free and enduring nation we inherit today.

== Reception ==
Resist was included on several book lists including ELLE, Glamour UK, Audible, BookRiot, The Next Big Idea Club, Publishers Weekly, and The Root.

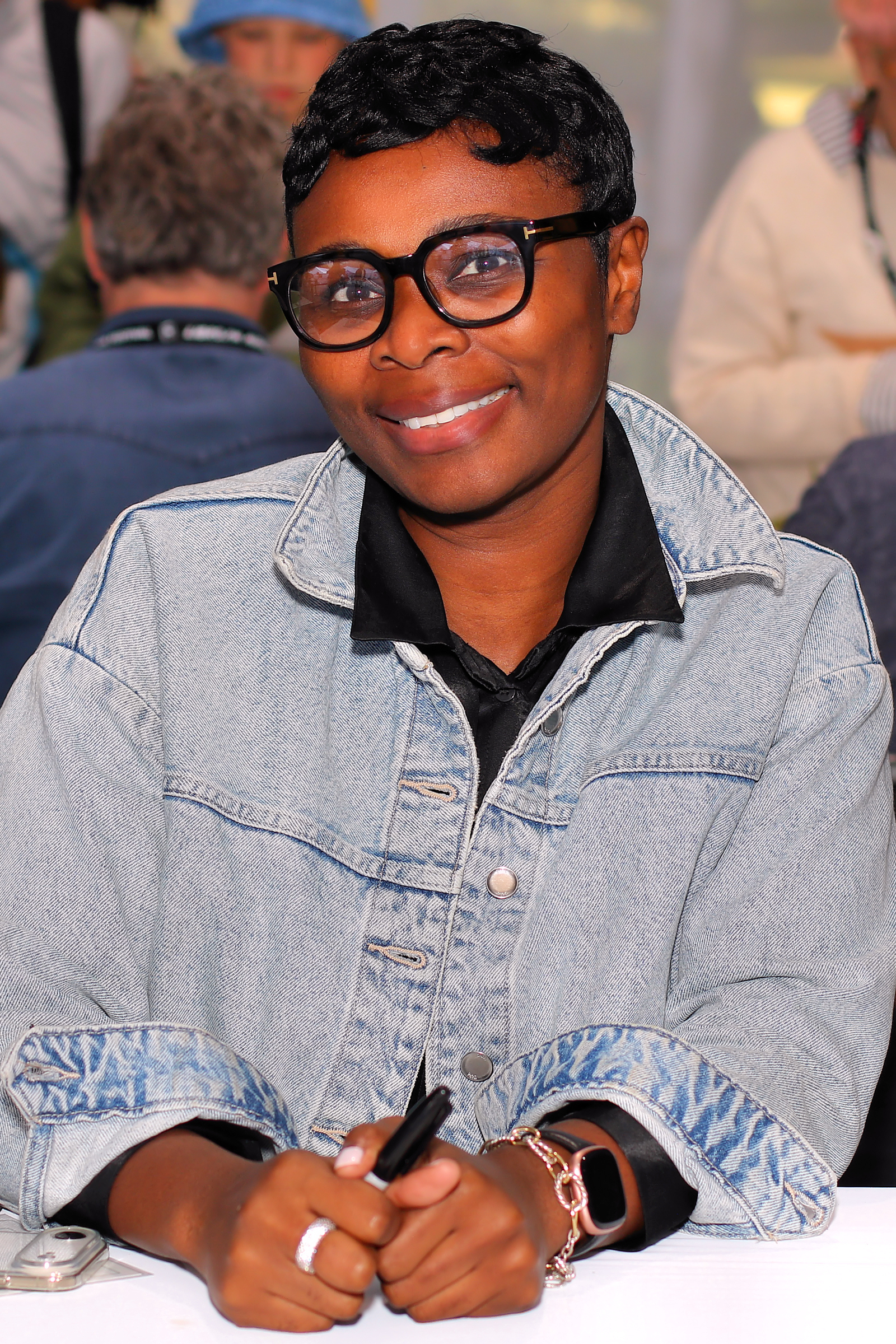
Author Rita Omokha at the 2025 Texas Book Festival.

In a review of the "Best Books of November 2024", Glamour UK described Resist as a "paradigm-shifting book," stating that it "not only celebrates the courage and determination of these young leaders but also emphasises the importance of their voices in shaping the future."

In a starred review from Booklist, A. E. Siraki describes Resist as "incredibly detailed and accessibly readable." Siraki discusses how "Omokha intersperses stories of individual race crimes with broader movements such as the formation of the NAACP, steadily guiding readers through each era. She helpfully bridges one time period with the next with the precision of a documentary filmmaker."

In another starred review, BookPage called Resist "a must-read for anyone looking to dive into the collected history of Black youth activism and its immense impact on America—and perhaps learn how to take action themselves."

Forbes referenced the book's timeliness: "At a time when activism and protest are happening throughout the U.S... Resist is particularly engaging as Omokha weaves in her experiences as a Black immigrant in the U.S., offering a personal voice."

ELLE said, "Omokha reminds us that young Black activists have always been beacons of hope and insisted on making America live up to its promise."

When discussing the takeaways from her debut during an MSNBC Morning Joe interview, Omokha said that the people she covers in Resist show that "your voice is your weapon".

Other critical reviews include those from Jonathan Eig, who called the book "Bold, inspiring, an act of resistance in itself." Jelani Cobb said Omokha "has written a crucial distillation of a century of activism and the changes wrought by it." Sunny Hostin called the book a "crucial asset and resource for today’s society" and that "encapsulates the everlasting and unwavering fight for justice and equality led by the trailblazing activists from decades past who are still influencing young Black leaders today."

Resist was featured at the 2025 Los Angeles Times Festival of Books, where Omokha participated in the "Speak Out: The Evolution of Activism" panel and book signing.
