= Esra Özatay =

Turkish female combat pilot and trainer

- Born: 1976 (age 49–50); Germany
- Children: 2
- Military career
- Service years: 1998–present
- Rank: Major
- Unit: Turkish Stars

Esra Özatay (born 1976) is a Turkish female military officer and aviator. She is the commander of the military aerobatics fleet.

== Private life ==
Özatay was born in 1976 in Germany. In 1993, she graduated from Kadıköy Girls High School and finished her education at the Turkish Air Force Academy in 1998.

She is married to a fighter pilot, and has a son Batuhan (born 1996) and a daughter Zeynep (born 1998).

== Career ==
She completed her training in 2000 at the 2nd Main Jet Base Command and served as an F-5 pilot within 132nd Fighter-Interceptor Fleet Command at Konya Air Base 3rd Main Jet Base Command until 2004. Özatay, also began serving as aviator trainer in 2010.

In 2014, she joined the 134th Aerobatics Fleet Command of the Turkish Stars and became their first female member. She was appointed as the fleet commander to the Turkish Stars in 2016 and became the first female fleet commander of the Turkish Air Force.
