= Internal Punishment Programs =

Studio album by Red Harvest
- Released: 2004
- Studio: Subsonic Society and LRZ Lair
- Genre: Industrial metal
- Length: 40:49
- Label: Nocturnal Art Productions
- Producer: Red Harvest

Red Harvest chronology
Sick Transit Gloria Mundi (2002)	Internal Punishment Programs (2004)	A Greater Darkness (2007)

Professional ratings
Review scores
Source	Rating
Allmusic	link
Chronicles of Chaos	–
Exclaim!	favorable
Metal.de	8/10
Rock Hard	8/10

Internal Punishment Programs is the seventh album by industrial metal band Red Harvest. It was released in 2004.

== Track listing ==
- All songs written and arranged by Red Harvest.
1. Anatomy of the Unknown – 3:28
2. Fall of Fate – 4:15
3. Abstract Morality Junction – 2:58
4. Mekanizm – 4:15
5. Symbol of Decay – 7:23
6. Teknocrate – 3:49
7. Synthesize My DNA – 4:04
8. Wormz – 2:57
9. 4-4-1-8 – 1:43
10. Internal Punishment Programs – 4:43

Bonus Video: "Anatomy of the Unknown" – 3:34

== Personnel ==
- Ofu Khan: Vocals, Guitars
- Kjetil "TurboNatas" Eggum: Guitars
- Lars "LRZ" Sørensen: Keyboards, Synthesizers, Sampling, Keyboard and Synth Programming
- Thomas Brandt: Bass
- Erik Wroldsen: Drums
