= A Greater Darkness =

Studio album by Red Harvest
- Released: 20 February 2007
- Genre: Industrial metal
- Length: 51:14
- Label: Season of Mist
- Producer: Red Harvest, Asgeir Mickelson

Red Harvest chronology
Internal Punishment Programs (2004)	A Greater Darkness (2007)

Professional ratings
Review scores
Source	Rating
Allmusic	link
Chronicles of Chaos	9/10
Metal.de	7/10
Metal Review	86/100
Rock Hard	9/10

A Greater Darkness is the eighth release by extreme industrial metal band Red Harvest. It was released on 20 February 2007. The album was nominated in 2007 for a Spellemann Award in the "Metal" category.

== Track listing ==
- All songs written by Red Harvest.
1. Antidote – 5:50
2. Hole in Me – 6:20
3. Dead Cities – 3:42
4. Mouth of Madness – 5:04
5. Beyond the Limits of Physical Xperience – 3:28
6. Icons of Fear... The Curse of the Universe – 4:01
7. I Sweat W.O.M.D. – 4:51
8. WarThemes – 4:28
9. Distorted Eyes – 10:37
10. Proprioception – 2:52

== Personnel ==
- Ofu Khan: Vocals, Guitars, Syntheiszers, Sampler
- TurboNatas: Guitars, Synthesizer
- Lrz: Keyboards, Synthesizers, Sampler
- Thomas B: Bass
- E_Wroldsen: Drums, Percussion

== Production ==
- Arranged, Produced, Recorded & Engineered By Red Harvest
- Co-Produced By Asgeir Mickelson
- Mixed By Borge Finstad
- Mastered By Audun Strype
