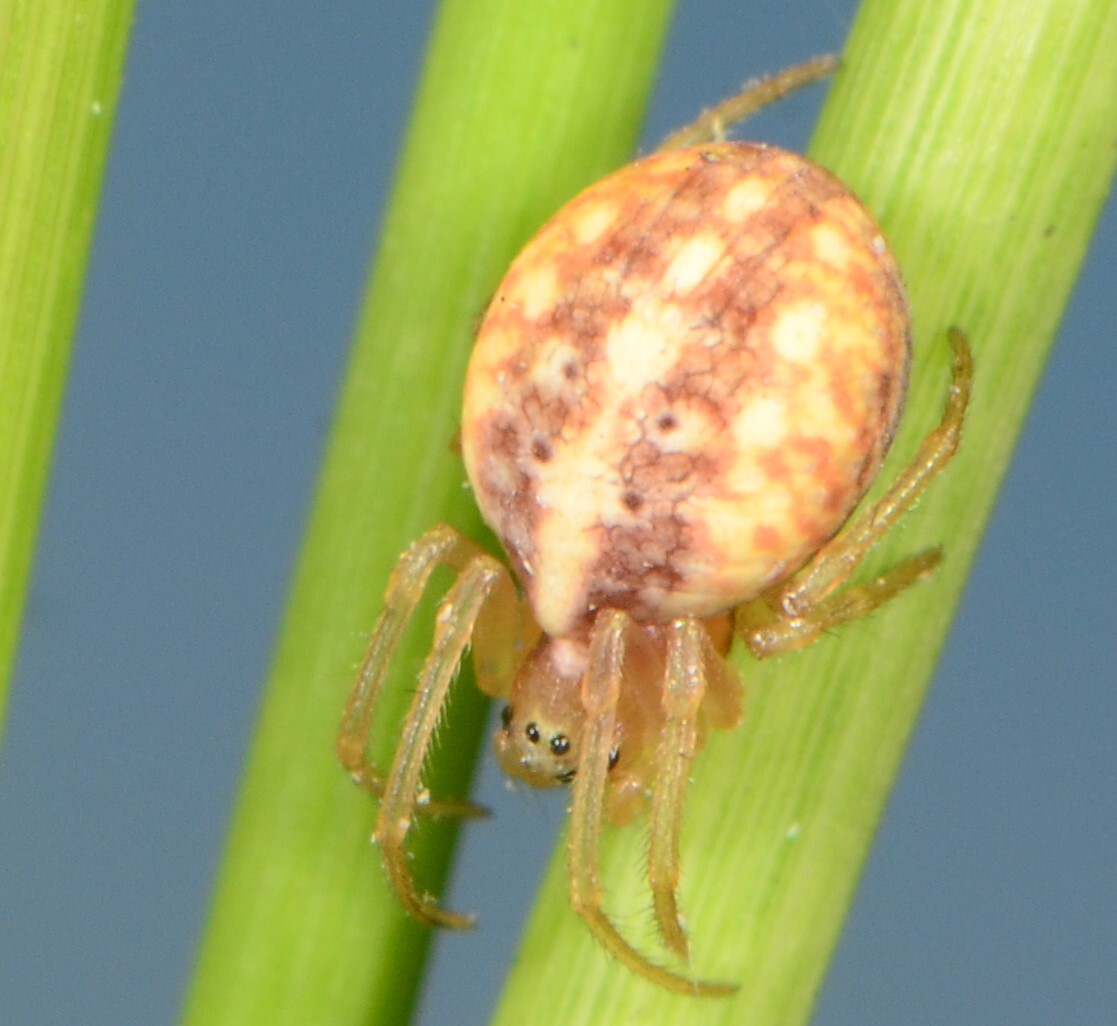
- female U. turbinata

Scientific classification
- Kingdom: Animalia
- Phylum: Arthropoda
- Subphylum: Chelicerata
- Class: Arachnida
- Order: Araneae
- Infraorder: Araneomorphae
- Family: Araneidae
- Genus: Ursa; Simon, 1895

Type species
- U. pulchra Simon, 1895

Species
- 5, see text

= Ursa (spider) =

Genus of spiders

Ursa is a genus of orb-weaver spiders first described by Eugène Simon in 1895.

== Description ==
Ursa are small spiders with a pear-shaped carapace and eyes in two rows. The anterior and posterior median eyes are close together, while lateral and anterior median eyes are larger than posterior lateral eyes. The abdomen is round and decorated with faint whitish markings. The legs are the same colour as the carapace, with leg IV being the shortest and leg I having rows of lined setae.

== Life style ==
Nothing is known about their behaviour, with some specimens sampled while sweeping grass.

== Species ==
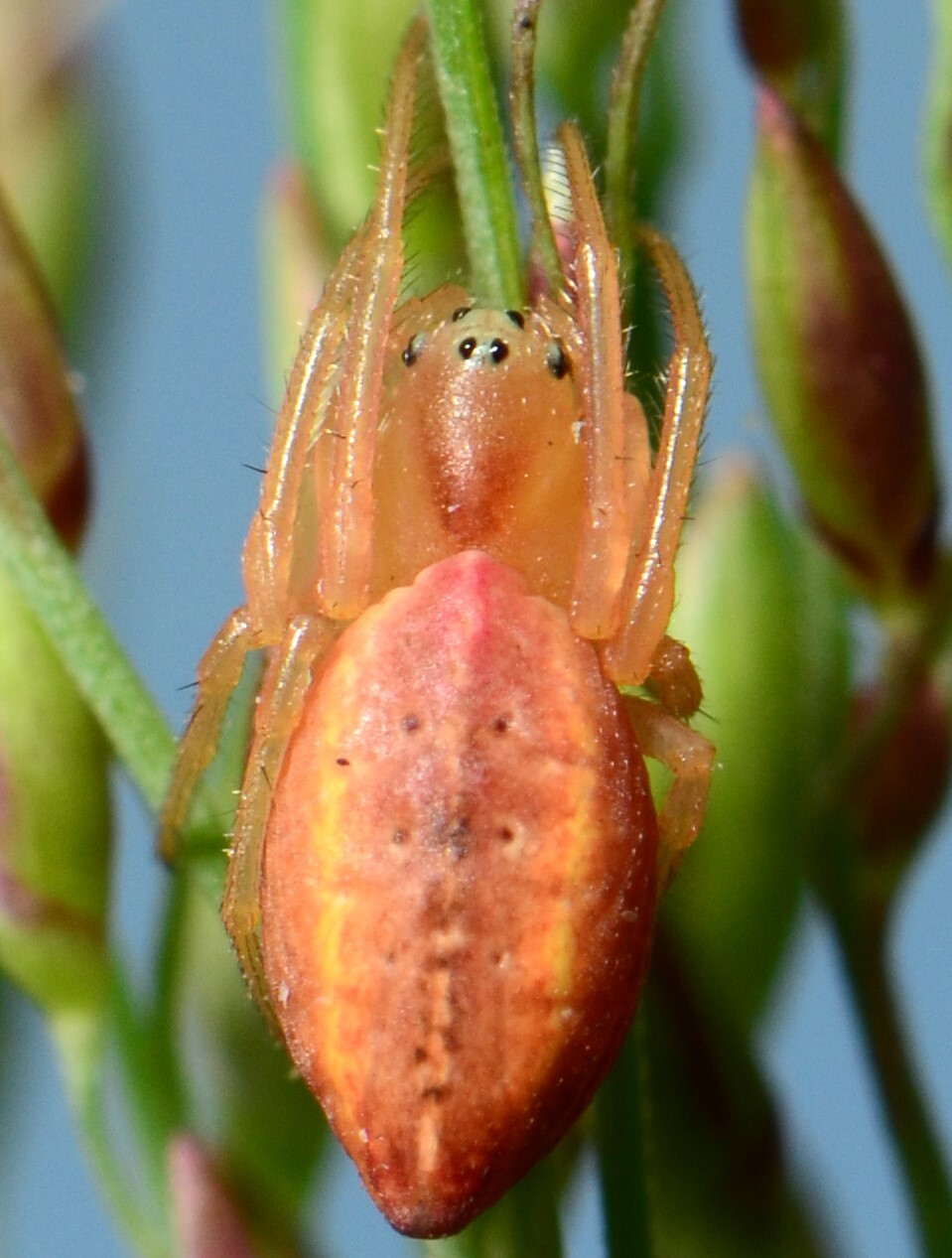
Ursa sp. from South Africa

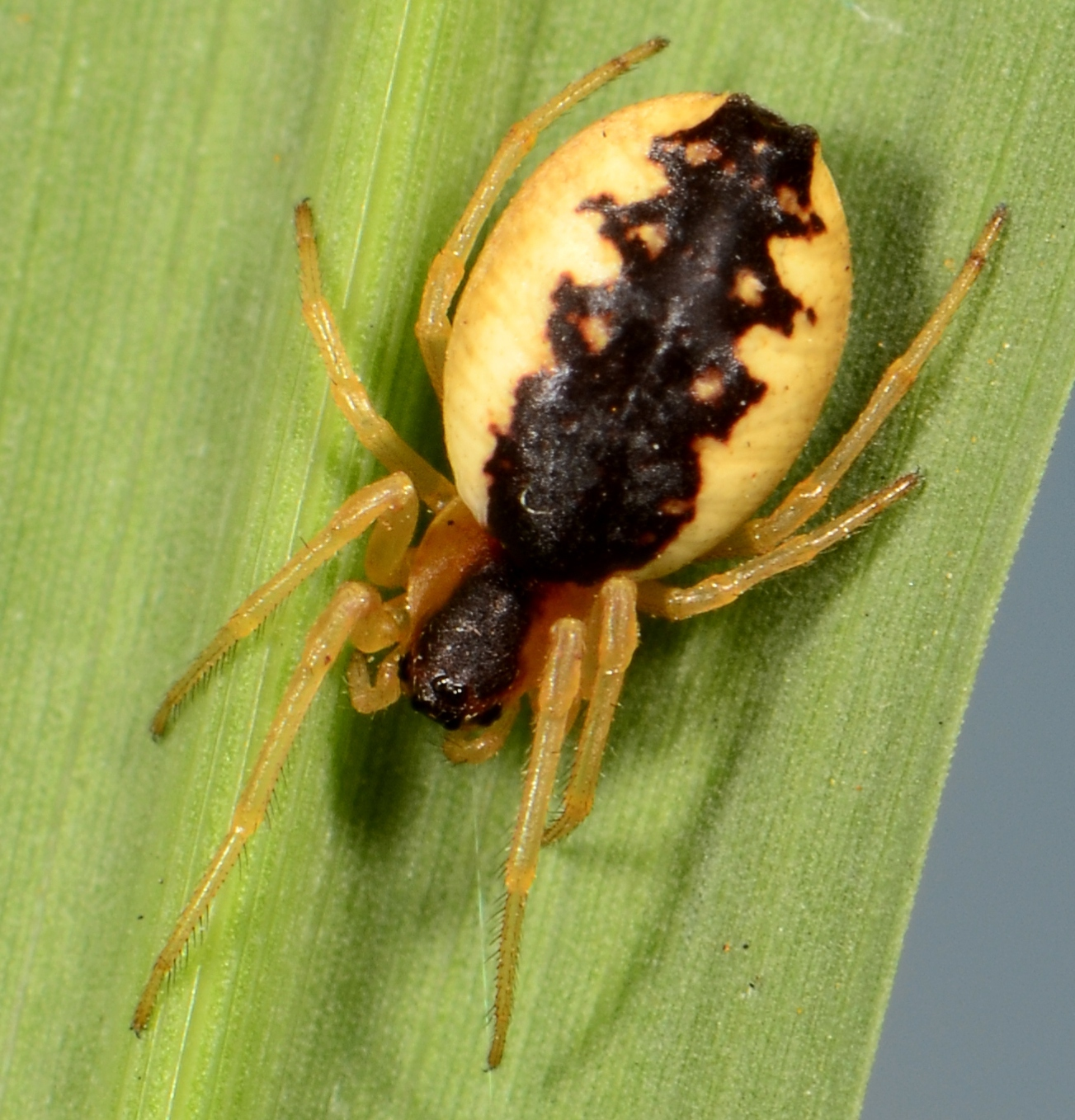
Ursa sp. from South Africa

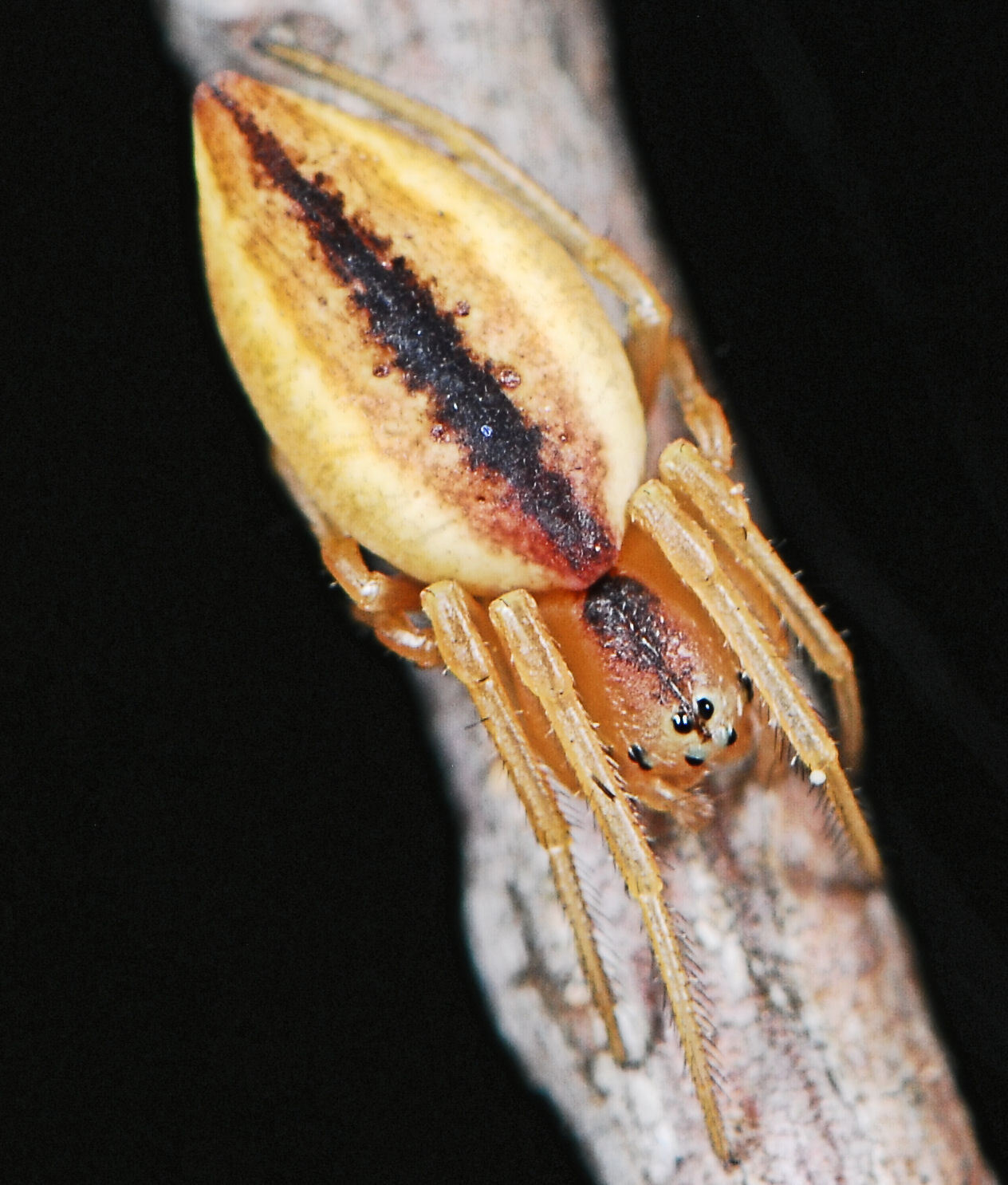
Ursa sp. from South America

As of September 2025, this genus includes five species:

- Ursa flavovittata Simon, 1909 – Vietnam
- Ursa lunula (Nicolet, 1849) – Chile
- Ursa pulchra Simon, 1895 – Brazil (type species)
- Ursa turbinata Simon, 1895 – South Africa
- Ursa vittigera Simon, 1895 – Sri Lanka
