= Sick Transit Gloria Mundi =

Studio album by Red Harvest
- Released: 2002
- Genre: Industrial metal
- Length: 49:58
- Label: Nocturnal Art Productions
- Producer: Neil Kernon

Red Harvest chronology
| New World Rage Music (2001) | Sick Transit Gloria Mundi (2002) | Internal Punishment Programs (2004) |

Professional ratings
Review scores
| Source | Rating |
|---|---|
| Exclaim! | favorable |
| Metal.de | 7/10 |
| Metal Review | 87/100 |
| Rock Hard | 8.5/10 |

Sick Transit Gloria Mundi is the sixth album by the industrial metal band Red Harvest. The album was released in 2002. The album was nominated for a Norwegian Grammy and an alternative Grammy in the "Best Metal Album" category.

== Track listing ==
Studio Album
| No. | Title | Length |
|---|---|---|
| 1. | "U.G.X." | 0:33 |
| 2. | "AEP" | 3:16 |
| 3. | "Godtech" | 4:08 |
| 4. | "Humanoia" | 4:11 |
| 5. | "Dead" | 5:00 |
| 6. | "CyberNaut" | 5:22 |
| 7. | "Beyond the End" | 6:15 |
| 8. | "Desolation" | 5:01 |
| 9. | "Sick Transit Gloria Mundi" | 2:50 |
| 10. | "Dead Men Don't Rape" | 4:23 |
| 11. | "WeltSchmertz" | 5:18 |
| 12. | "(Dead End)" | 3:39 |
