= Cold Dark Matter (Red Harvest album) =

Studio album by Red Harvest
- Released: 2000
- Genres: Industrial metal; noise rock
- Length: 38:31
- Label: Nocturnal Art Productions

Red Harvest chronology
Hybreed (1996)	Cold Dark Matter (2000)	New World Rage Music (2001)

Professional ratings
Review scores
Source	Rating
Brave Words	7.5/10
Chronicles of Chaos	–
Metal.de	6/10
Metal Review	75/100

Cold Dark Matter is the fourth album by industrial metal band Red Harvest. It was released in 2000. It was later re-released in 2001 in the US, with extra tracks.

== Track listing ==
Studio Album
No.	Title	Length
1.	"Omnipotent"	3:09
2.	"Last Call"	4:39
3.	"Absolut Dunkel:Heit (Featuring Fenriz of Darkthrone)"	3:35
4.	"Cold Dark Matter"	4:22
5.	"Junk-O-Rama"	3:54
6.	"Fix, Hammer, Fix"	2:57
7.	"The Itching Scull"	3:31
8.	"Death in Cyborg Era"	7:51
9.	"Move or Be Moved"	4:33

Bonus (US Version)
No.	Title	Length
1.	"Intro"
2.	"Ad Noctum"
3.	"Move or Be Moved (Preview)"
4.	"Swallow the Sun"
5.	"Pity the Bastard"
