= Voices of Wonder =

Norwegian rock record label

Voices of Wonder a.k.a. Voice of Wonder Records was one of the most important rock record labels in Oslo, Norway in the early 1990s. The label was fronted by a small and intimate record store on Olaf Ryes plass, which in addition to the labels own artists specialized in the English Earache Records and the American Sub Pop labels.

In the second half of the 1990s the store changed focus, from metal and grindcore to dance and electronic music. This alienated many of the old customers, and the label and store never managed to gain entry on the new scene. Thus, today the store is no more and the label is less active than before.

Voices of Wonder also distributed for Euronymous of Mayhem's Deathlike Silence Productions.

Voice of Wonder Records AS changed name to Voices Music & Entertainment in 2001, and now operates as VME's sublabel.

== Roster ==
- The 3rd and the Mortal
- Anal Babes
- Carpe Tenebrum
- The Disciplines
- Dog Age
- Enslaved
- Full Moon
- Grady
- Mayhem
- Motorpsycho
- Origami Teknika
- Red Harvest
- Sister Rain
- The Tables
- Tangled Edge
- The Popcorn Explosion

== See also ==
- List of record labels
