= Live at the Opera =

Live album by Satyricon with The Norwegian National Opera Chorus
- Released: May 1, 2015
- Recorded: September 8, 2013 at Oslo Opera House in Norway
- Genre: Symphonic black metal
- Length: 93:07
- Language: English, Norwegian
- Label: Napalm, Indie
- Producer: Sigurd Wongraven

Satyricon chronology
Satyricon (2013)	Live at the Opera (2015)	Deep Calleth Upon Deep (2017)

Live at the Opera is the first live album by the Norwegian black metal band Satyricon, originally released in 2015 under the Austrian label Napalm Records.

It consists of a digipak with two CD and one bonus DVD on limited edition, both with the same songs. Additionally, the album was released in a special edition of three vinyl records.

== Background ==
In February 2015, the frontman Satyr explained how the concept (new label, new DVD) came together: “The whole thing started with us doing one song, 'To the Mountains' a year and a half before the actual show. We performed at a closed event in the main hall of the opera with the Chorus of the Norwegian Opera and Ballet (Den Norske Opera & Ballett Operakoret). It was very inspirational. I then said to the conductor that I would love to do a whole show like this. He loved the idea, I was serious about it, and he was serious about it.”

Live at the Opera comes from a nearly two-hour special live performance, which was shot and edited on DVD. The exclusive show was held on September 8, 2013, at the Oslo Opera House (Operahuset) in Norway, as part of the Ultima Oslo Contemporary Music Festival held annually.

It presents the outstanding participation of 55 singers from the Chorus of the Norwegian Opera & Ballet (Operakoret).

== Track listing (CD and bonus DVD) ==
- All songs written by Sigurd "Satyr" Wongraven, except where noted.

No.	Title	Length
1.	"Voice of Shadows" (From the album Satyricon)	02:21
2.	"Now, Diabolical" (From the album Now, Diabolical)	06:07
3.	"Repined Bastard Nation" (From the album Volcano)	05:42
4.	"Our World, It Rumbles Tonight" (From the album Satyricon)	05:17
5.	"Nocturnal Flare" (From the album Satyricon)	07:14
6.	"Die by My Hand" (From the album The Age of Nero)	07:07
7.	"Tro og Kraft" (Belief and Power, from the album Satyricon)	06:05
8.	"Phoenix" (Guest vocals and lyrics: Sivert Høyem, from the album Satyricon)	07:28
9.	"Den Siste" (The Last, from the album The Age of Nero)	07:18
10.	"The Infinity of Time and Space" (From the album Satyricon)	08:47
11.	"To the Mountains" (From the album Now, Diabolical)	08:52
12.	"The Pentagram Burns" (From the album Now, Diabolical)	06:25
13.	"Mother North" (From the album Nemesis Divina)	06:01
14.	"K.I.N.G." (From the album Now, Diabolical)	08:23
Total length:		93:07

== Personnel ==
=== Satyricon ===
- Satyr - Vocals (tracks 2–7, 9–14), guitar (tracks 1, 8, 11, 12)
- Frost - Drums

=== Additional musicians ===
- Anders Odden - Bass
- Anders Hunstad - Keyboards
- Gildas Le Pape - Guitar
- Steinar Gundersen - Guitar
- Sivert Høyem - Vocals on "Phoenix"
- The Norwegian National Opera Chorus - Choir
  - Kristin Rustad Høiseth - Soprano
  - Rolf Sostmann - Tenor

=== Production and Engineering ===
- Graphics by Martin Kvamme
- Mastered by George Tanderø
- Mixed by Erik Ljunggren
- Photography Espen Ixtlan and Kaleidoscope
- Recording by Steven Grant Bishop
- Printed by Optimal Media GmbH

== Charts ==
Chart (2015)	Peak position
Belgian Albums (Ultratop Flanders)	168
Belgian Albums (Ultratop Wallonia)	162
German Albums (Offizielle Top 100)	56
Norwegian Albums (VG-lista)	26
