= My Skin Is Cold =

EP by Satyricon
- Released: 2 June 2008
- Genre: Black metal, black 'n' roll
- Length: 31:14
- Label: Roadrunner
- Producer: Satyr Wongraven

Satyricon chronology
Now, Diabolical (2006)	My Skin Is Cold (2008)	The Age of Nero (2008)

My Skin Is Cold is the third EP by Norwegian black metal band Satyricon. It contains one new song, two re-mastered, and two live songs with an orchestra playing with the band.

== Track listing ==
1. "My Skin Is Cold" - 05:06
2. "Live Through Me (Re-mastered)" - 05:12 (bonus track from Volcano)
3. "Existential Fear-Questions (Re-mastered)" - 06:02 (bonus track from Volcano)
4. "Repined Bastard Nation (Live w/orchestra)" - 05:48 (from Volcano)
5. "Mother North (Live w/orchestra) - 09:06 (from Nemesis Divina)

== Credits ==
=== Satyricon ===
- Satyr (Sigurd Wongraven) – vocals, guitars, keyboards, bass (on "Live Through Me" & "Existential Fear-Questions")
- Frost (Kjetil-Vidar Haraldstad) – drums

=== Live band ===
- Steinar Gundersen (also known as "Azarak") – lead guitars
- A. O. Grønbech (Obsidian Claw) – rhythm guitars
- Lars K. Norberg – bass
- Jonna Nikula – keyboards

=== Session ===
- Victor Brandt – bass (on "My Skin is Cold")
- Snorre Ruch – additional guitars (on "My Skin is Cold")
- Knut "Euroboy" Schreiner – guitar solo (on "Existential Fear-Questions")

== Production ==
- Engineered by Lars Klokkerhaug at Sonic Society, April 2008
- Mixed by Lars Klokkerhaug and Satyr at Sonic Society, April 2008

== Trivia ==
- The original versions of the "re-mastered" tracks were only released as bonus tracks on the LP edition of Volcano.
- Both live tracks with orchestra are from the "Gjallarhorn Show at Sentrum Scene, Oslo, November 2006".
- The music and lyrics on "My Skin Is Cold" are based on a dream Satyr had during his visit to Tokyo in October 2007.
