= Megiddo (EP) =

EP by Satyricon
- Released: June 13, 1997
- Genre: Black metal
- Length: 20:50
- Label: Moonfog

Satyricon chronology
Nemesis Divina (1996)	Megiddo (1997)	Intermezzo II (1999)

Professional ratings
Review scores
Source	Rating
Chronicles of Chaos	4/10

Megiddo is the first EP by Norwegian black metal band Satyricon, and the first release following their 1996 studio album Nemesis Divina.

== Background ==
On the EP, the band commented, "Megiddo marked five years of Satyricon, and it gave us the chance to break down some barriers and do something completely different."

== Track listing ==
No.	Title	Length
1.	"The Dawn of a New Age" (remixed by Apoptygma Berzerk)	5:45
2.	"Night of Divine Power" (re-recording of "The Dark Castle in the Deep Forest" from Dark Medieval Times)	5:50
3.	"Forhekset" (live)	4:16
4.	"Orgasmatron" (Motörhead cover)	4:59

== Personnel ==
Satyricon

- Satyr (Sigurd Wongraven) – vocals, guitar, bass guitar, keyboards
- Frost (Kjetil-Vidar Haraldstad) – drums

Session musicians

- Gerlioz (Geir Bratland) – synthesizer on "Night of Divine Power"
- Grothesk (Stephan Groth) – synthesizer, programming on "Orgasmatron"
- Anders Odden – guitars, bass guitar on "Orgasmatron"
