= Intermezzo II =

EP by Satyricon
- Released: May 10, 1999
- Recorded: January 1996 (track 3); January 1999 (track 1, 2, 4)
- Studio: Waterfall Studios (track 3); Ambience Studios (track 1 & 2); Thorns Facilities (track 4), Oslo, Norway
- Genre: Black metal
- Length: 20:10
- Label: Moonfog, Nuclear Blast
- Producer: Satyr

Satyricon chronology
Megiddo (1997)	Intermezzo II (1999)	Rebel Extravaganza (1999)

Professional ratings
Review scores
Source	Rating
Chronicles of Chaos	8/10
Collector's Guide to Heavy Metal	8/10

Intermezzo II is the second EP by Norwegian black metal band Satyricon. It was released on 10 May 1999, through Moonfog Productions.

== Background ==
On the conception of the EP, the band have stated, "We've used mini-album format to express ourselves musically in a way that would probably break with the scarlet thread of a full-length album. Intermezzo II was meant to be an appetiser for Rebel Extravaganza, but it turned out to be more of a thing of its own."

The EP features a cover of "I.N.R.I." by Sarcófago. The cover was also included on the tribute album Tribute to Sarcófago, released by Cogumelo Records in 2001.

== Track listing ==
No.	Title	Length
1.	"A Moment of Clarity"	6:40
2.	"INRI" (Sarcófago cover)	2:11
3.	"Nemesis Divina (Clean Vision Mix)"	5:16
4.	"Blessed from Below (Melancholy/Oppression/Longing)"	6:03

== Personnel ==
Satyricon

- Satyr (Sigurd Wongraven) – vocals, guitar, special effects, bass guitar on "Nemesis Divina (Clean Vision Mix)", mastering, sleeve design, styling and make-up for sleeve photos
- Frost (Kjetil-Vidar Haraldstad) – drums, riff contribution on "A Moment of Clarity", styling and make-up for sleeve photos

Session musicians

- Sanrabb (Morten Furuly) – guitar on "A Momentof Clarity" and "INRI"
- Ingar Amlien – bass guitar on "A Momentof Clarity" and "INRI"
- Vegard Blomberg – special effects on "A Momentof Clarity" and "INRI"

Production

- Mike Hartung – engineering
- Kai Robøle – engineering
- Espen Berg – mastering
- Union Insomnia – sleeve design
- Marcel Lelienhoff – sleeve photography
- Sidske van der Voss – styling for sleeve photos
- Alysia Cooper – make-up for sleeve photos
