= Deep Calleth Upon Deep =

Studio album by Satyricon
- Released: 22 September 2017
- Recorded: March–April 2017
- Studio: Oslo Klang (Oslo, Norway), Armoury Studios (Vancouver, Canada)
- Length: 43:34
- Label: Napalm
- Producer: Satyr

Satyricon chronology
Live at the Opera (2015)	Deep Calleth Upon Deep (2017)	Satyricon & Munch (2022)

Professional ratings
Review scores
Source	Rating
Blabbermouth.net	9/10
PopMatters	6/10

Deep Calleth Upon Deep is the ninth studio album by Norwegian black metal band Satyricon. It was released on 22 September 2017 under Napalm Records.

A music video was made for "To Your Brethren in the Dark", directed by Laban Pheidias. The video (the first from the band in nine years), features American actresses Tonya Cornelisse, Jesse Hotchkiss, Diana Wyenn and Shawn Kathryn Kane.

In January 2018, the album was nominated in Norway for the Spellemann Award for best metal album. However, the winner was E of Enslaved.

== Background ==
Deep Calleth Upon Deep began to be composed in early 2015. However, in late September/early October of that year Satyricon frontman, Sigurd Wongraven, was diagnosed with a benign brain tumor. Due to this situation, the production process for a new album suffered significant delays, while he underwent months of non-surgical treatment and recovery.

Finally, the album was recorded between March and April 2017 in Oslo Klang, a recording facility in downtown Oslo, Norway, and Armoury Studios in Vancouver, Canada. The disc features guest session musicians such as Anders Odden (Satyricon's live bassist), jazz saxophonist Håkon Kornstad and some members of Oslo Philharmonic, but their contributions are somewhat lower than in other albums of the band.

It was mixed in July by Mike Fraser, who had already worked with Satyricon in Now, Diabolical (2006).

The musical style is very similar to their previous albums, with a tempo mostly slower, structures influenced by post-rock music and an accessible and commercial sound. It has been described as a more black 'n' roll direction, instead of the more traditional black metal.

The singular cover art comes from an obscure illustration by recognized Norwegian artist Edvard Munch, drawn in 1898.

== Track listing ==
All tracks are written by Sigurd "Satyr" Wongraven.

No.	Title	Length
1.	"Midnight Serpent"	6:21
2.	"Blood Cracks Open the Ground"	4:53
3.	"To Your Brethren in the Dark"	6:08
4.	"Deep Calleth Upon Deep"	4:37
5.	"The Ghost of Rome"	4:27
6.	"Dissonant"	4:14
7.	"Black Wings and Withering Gloom"	7:11
8.	"Burial Rite"	5:43
Total length:		43:34

== Personnel ==
=== Satyricon ===
- Satyr: vocals, lead guitar, keyboards
- Frost: drums

=== Session musicians ===
- Anders Odden: bass, rhythm guitar
- Håkon Kornstad: tenor saxophone (track 6), backing vocals (tracks 4 & 5)
- Arild Stav: bass clarinet
- Hans Josef Grih: cello
- Frode Carlsen: contrabassoon
- Bjarne Magnus Jensen: violin
- Jan Olav Martinsen: French horn
- Tom Ottar Andreassen: wind instruments

=== Production ===
- Arranged and produced by Satyr
- Recorded at Oslo Klang, in a 500 year old storehouse and at the Armoury Studios, Vancouver.
- Design – Halvor Bodin
- Engineered by – Bjarne Stensli, Erik Ljunggren, French Horn, Jan Olav Martinsen
- Front cover illustration – Edvard Munch
- Mastered by – George Tanderø
- Classical arrangements, mellotron – Kjetil Bjerkestrand
- Mixed by – Mike Fraser
- Photography – Johan Wildhagen

== Charts ==
Chart	Peak position
Austrian Albums (Ö3 Austria)	24
Belgian Albums (Ultratop Flanders)	61
Belgian Albums (Ultratop Wallonia)	84
Finnish Albums (Suomen virallinen lista)	17
French Albums (SNEP)	152
German Albums (Offizielle Top 100)	20
Norwegian Albums (VG-lista)	7
Swedish Albums (Sverigetopplistan)	36
Swiss Albums (Schweizer Hitparade)	25
