= 1349 (band) =

Norwegian black metal band

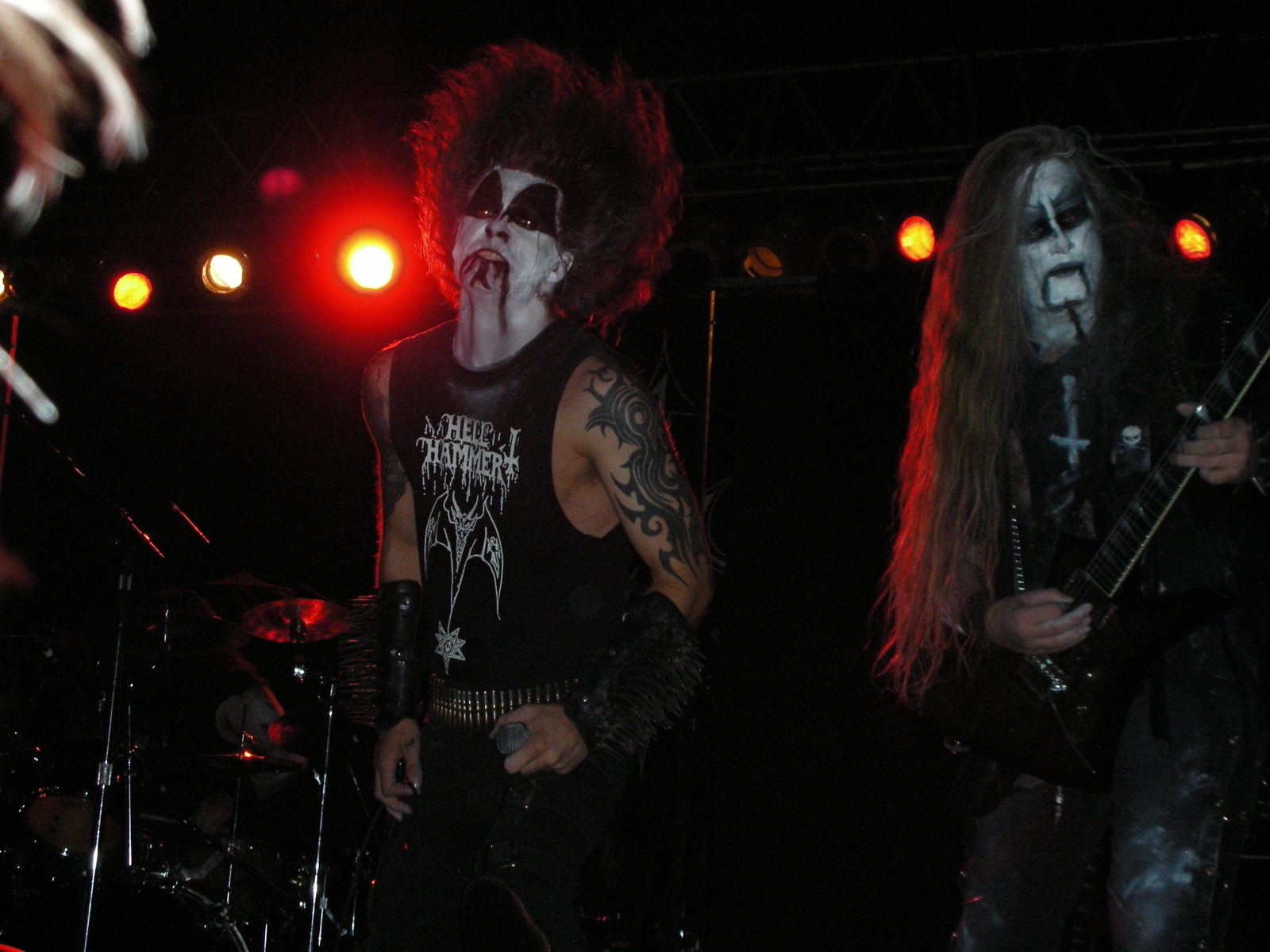
- 1349 performing in the United States in 2006.

Background information
- Origin: Oslo, Norway
- Genre: Black metal
- Years active: 1997–present
- Labels: Holycaust, Candlelight, Indie, Prosthetic, Season of Mist
- Members: Ravn; Seidemann; Archaon; Frost
- Past members: Lars Larsen; André Kvebek
- Website: legion1349.com

1349 is a Norwegian black metal band from Oslo, formed in 1997. The band's name references the year the Black Death reached Norway.

== History ==
1349 formed in 1997, and consists of several former members of the band Alvheim. Drummer Frost is also a member of Satyricon.

In recognition of 1349's influences, the band covered Mayhem's "Buried by Time and Dust" on their debut album, Liberation. At 1349's live shows, the band has covered Celtic Frost, whom vocalist Ravn cites as his principal influence.

1349 tours regularly. The band's live shows often begin with Frost and guitarist Archaon breathing fire. In 2006, 1349 toured the US with Celtic Frost. Ravn appeared on the Celtic Frost album Monotheist (2006), performing guest vocals on the CD digipack bonus track "Temple of Depression". In 2007, during the French Hellfest festival, 1349 was slated to play during the day, but asked to reschedule their appearance to play in the dark instead. During 1349's appearance at the Oslo Inferno Metal Festival in March 2008, Celtic Frost frontman Tom Gabriel Fischer joined the band onstage for a rendition of the Celtic Frost song "The Usurper". In September 2008, 1349 toured with Carcass, Suffocation, Aborted and Rotten Sound on the Exhume to Consume Tour.

A music video for "Sculptor of Flesh" was made following the release of Hellfire (2005). The video, directed by Judd Tilyard, alternates footage of the band performing the song in Norway with clips of surgery filmed in Australia.

During late 2008, 1349 recorded its fourth album, Revelations of the Black Flame. Co-mixed by Tom Gabriel Fischer, the album was released in Europe on 25 May 2009. Revelations of the Black Flame changed direction for the band, with slower songs and dark ambient and industrial-tinged tracks.

At the beginning of 2010, the band signed with Indie Recordings for the release of its fifth album in Europe, with Prosthetic Records distributing the album in North America.

1349 toured with Cannibal Corpse, Skeletonwitch, and Lecherous Nocturne on the Evisceration Plague Tour, in April–May 2010. The band performed at the Wacken Open Air and Summer Breeze Open Air festivals in August 2010.

1349 released its fifth album, Demonoir, on 26 April 2010. The album returned to 1349's earlier sound, before Revelations of the Black Flame, while continuing the low-fi production and ambient sensibilities of Revelations. 1349 toured Canada and the United States with Tom Gabriel Fischer's project Triptykon in October 2010. A deluxe box set of Demonoir was released in October 2011. The band's first live DVD, Hellvetia Fire – The Official 1349 Bootleg, was released on 24 October 2011 by Candlelight Records. It was filmed at Bikini Test La Chaux De Fonds in Switzerland in 2005.

In October 2013, the band began recording their sixth studio album, Massive Cauldron of Chaos. On 10 December, the band announced that the record was finished, and it was released on 29 September 2014, via Indie Recordings.

In February 2017, it was announced that 1349 signed to Season of Mist and were writing their seventh studio album, set to be released in 2019. The first single from the album, "Dødskamp", was released digitally on 14 January 2019. On 31 July 2019, it was revealed that the band's seventh studio album would be titled The Infernal Pathway. It was released on 18 October 2019. According to the band’s instagram profile in April 2024, they were recording their eighth studio album. On 3 May, 2024 the band released the first single from the album, "Ash of Ages". On 9 July 2024, they released the track "Shadow Point" as well as full details of their eighth studio album, The Wolf & the King, released on October 4, 2024.

== Members ==
=== Current members ===
- Olav "Ravn" Bergene – lead vocals (1997–present), drums (1997–2000)
- Tor Risdal "Seidemann" Stavenes – bass, backing vocals (1997–present)
- Idar "Archaon" Burheim – guitars, backing vocals (1999–present)
- Kjetil-Vidar "Frost" Haraldstad – drums (2000–present)

=== Former members ===
- Lars "Balfori" Larsen – guitars (1997–1998)
- André "Tjalve" Kvebek – guitars (1997–2006)

=== Touring members ===
- Tony Laureano – drums (2006)
- Morten "Teloch" Iversen – guitars (2006–2007)
- Mads Guldbekkhei – drums (2007–2008)
- Thor "Destructhor" Anders Myhren – guitars (2008, 2015)
- Tony "Secthdamon" Ingibergsson – guitars, backing vocals (2009, 2016–present)
- Jon "The Charn" Rice – drums (2012)
- Sondre Drangsland – drums (2014–2018)
- Nils "Dominator" Fjellström – drums (2018–present)

== Discography ==
=== Studio albums ===
- Liberation (2003)
- Beyond the Apocalypse (2004)
- Hellfire (2005)
- Revelations of the Black Flame (2009)
- Demonoir (2010)
- Massive Cauldron of Chaos (2014)
- The Infernal Pathway (2019)
- The Wolf & the King (2024)

=== EP ===
- 1349 (2001)
- Dødskamp (2019)

=== Demos ===
- Demo (1998)
- Chaos Preferred (1999)

=== DVD ===
- Hellvetia Fire – The Official 1349 Bootleg DVD (2011)
