= Satyricon (Satyricon album) =

Studio album by Satyricon
- Released: 9 September 2013
- Recorded: February–June 2013
- Studio: Studio Stabbur (using analog equipment); Propeller Studios (using analog equipment); Studio X, Seattle, Washington
- Genre: Black metal, heavy metal
- Length: 51:22; 66:13 (with bonus tracks)
- Label: Nuclear Blast, Roadrunner, Indie
- Producer: Satyr

Satyricon chronology
The Age of Nero (2008)	Satyricon (2013)	Live at the Opera (2015)

Professional ratings
Review scores
Source	Rating
AllMusic	(positive)
BW&BK	6/10
PopMatters	5/10 stars
Sputnikmusic	2.1/5
Ultimate Guitar	7/10 stars

Satyricon is the eighth studio album by Norwegian black metal band Satyricon. It is their first topping VG-lista, the official Norwegian albums chart. It was released throughout Europe on 9 September 2013, and released on 17 September 2013 in US and Canada.

== Track listing ==
All tracks are written by Sigurd "Satyr" Wongraven, except "Phoenix" written by Sivert Høyem.

No.	Title	Length
1.	"Voice of Shadows"	2:36
2.	"Tro og kraft"	6:01
3.	"Our World, It Rumbles Tonight"	5:13
4.	"Nocturnal Flare"	6:38
5.	"Phoenix"	6:32
6.	"Walker Upon the Wind"	4:48
7.	"Nekrohaven"	3:12
8.	"Ageless Northern Spirit"	4:44
9.	"The Infinity of Time and Space"	7:48
10.	"Natt"	3:44
Total length:		51:22

Bonus tracks
No.	Title	Length
11.	"Phoenix (Recording Session Rough Mix)"	6:32
12.	"Our World, It Rumbles Tonight (Deeper Low Mix)"	5:07
13.	"Natt (Wet Mix)"	3:34

== Personnel ==
=== Satyricon ===
- Satyr – vocals, electric guitar, acoustic guitar, bass guitar, keyboards, percussion
- Frost – drums

=== Additional personnel ===
- Gildas Le Pape – guitars, additional bass guitar
- Sivert Høyem – vocals on "Phoenix"
- Erik Ljunggren – keyboards
- Kjetil Bjerkestrand – pump organ on "Natt"
- Karl Oluf Wennerberg – percussion on "Phoenix"

=== Production ===
- Satyr – arrangements, production, mixing
- Erik Ljunggren – lead recording
- Jacob Dobewall – recording assistance
- Mike Hartung – recording assistance
- Adam Kasper – mixing
- Nate Yaccino – mixing, recording assistance
- Sam Hoffstedt – additional mixing, recording assistance
- Paul Logus – mastering

== Charts ==
Chart (2013)	Peak position
Austrian Albums (Ö3 Austria)	36
Belgian Albums (Ultratop Flanders)	108
Belgian Albums (Ultratop Wallonia)	148
Finnish Albums (Suomen virallinen lista)	6
Norwegian Albums (VG-lista)	1
Swedish Albums (Sverigetopplistan)	18
Swiss Albums (Schweizer Hitparade)	47
German Albums (Offizielle Top 100)	37
UK Rock & Metal Albums (OCC)	10
