= Rebel Extravaganza =

Studio album by Satyricon
- Released: September 6, 1999
- Recorded: March–April 1999
- Studio: Ambience Studios, Oslo, Norway
- Genre: Black metal
- Length: 60:34
- Label: Moonfog
- Producer: Satyr

Satyricon chronology
Intermezzo II (1999)	Rebel Extravaganza (1999)	Volcano (2002)

Professional ratings
Review scores
Source	Rating
AllMusic	2.5/5 stars
Chronicles of Chaos	9/10
Collector's Guide to Heavy Metal	9/10
Rock Hard	9.5/10

Rebel Extravaganza is the fourth studio album by Norwegian black metal band Satyricon. It was released in 1999, through Moonfog Productions. In 2021, it was named one of the 20 best metal albums of 1999 by Metal Hammer magazine.

== Background ==
Satyr viewed Rebel Extravaganza as an album that embodies both inhuman and anti-human characteristics: "The lyrics are very misanthropic and I feel the album itself is quite cold and cynical. It's not that emotional, it's more lifeless in a way."

While the album incorporates industrial elements, Frost contended that this aspect of the album has been overblown: "I don't hear as much of an industrial influence in Satyricon's music...I know that several people found Rebel Extravaganza to have lots of industrial qualities and influences, but I can hear them in very few places, not dominating the album in any way."

On the album, the band have commented that black metal "had come to a point where romance and bloodsucking seemed more important than darkness and extremity".

== Release ==
Rebel Extravaganza was also released on Nuclear Blast (CD and vinyl) and Spinefarm Records in 1999 under license. It was re-released in 2006 by Nuclear Blast as a Deluxe Edition, with the tracks from the EP Intermezzo II as a bonus.

== Track listing ==
All tracks are written by Sigurd "Satyr" Wongraven.

No.	Title	Length
1.	"Tied in Bronze Chains"	10:56
2.	"Filthgrinder"	6:39
3.	"Rhapsody in Filth"	1:38
4.	"Havoc Vulture"	6:45
5.	"Prime Evil Renaissance"	6:13
6.	"Supersonic Journey"	7:49
7.	"End of Journey"	2:18
8.	"A Moment of Clarity"	6:40
9.	"Down South, Up North"	1:13
10.	"The Scorn Torrent"	10:23

Note: The CD has a hidden intro at position "0", accessible by rewinding the CD from the start.

== Credits ==
Satyricon

- Satyr (Sigurd Wongraven) – vocals, guitar, bass guitar, keyboards
- Frost (Kjetil-Vidar Haraldstad) – drums

Session musicians

- Anders Odden – lead guitar on "Tied in Bronze Chains", rhythm guitar on "Tied in Bronze Chains", "Prime Evil Renaissance" and "Supersonic Journey"
- Død (Daniel Olaisen) – riff contribution on "Tied in Bronze Chains" and "Havoc Vulture"
- S. W. Krupp (Snorre Westvold Ruch) – guitar on "Filthgrinder", "A Moment of Clarity" and "The Scorn Torrent", riff contribution on "Havoc Vulture"
- Fenriz (Leif Gylve Nagell) – percussion on "Havoc Vulture" and "Prime Evil Renaissance"
- Lasse Hafreager (Lars A. Hafreager) – Hammond organ on "Havoc Vulture"
- Gerlioz (Geir Bratland) – synthesizer on "Supersonic Journey"
- Bjørn Boge – fretless bass guitar on "The Scorn Torrent"
- Stelbis – choir vocals on "Down South, Up North"

== Charts ==
Chart (1999)	Peak position
Finnish Albums Chart	27
Norwegian Albums Chart	32
