= Victor Brandt =

Victor Brandt may refer to:

- Victor Brandt (actor) (born 1942), American actor
- Victor Brandt (musician) (born 1983), Swedish heavy metal musician
