= Firespawn =

Swedish death metal band

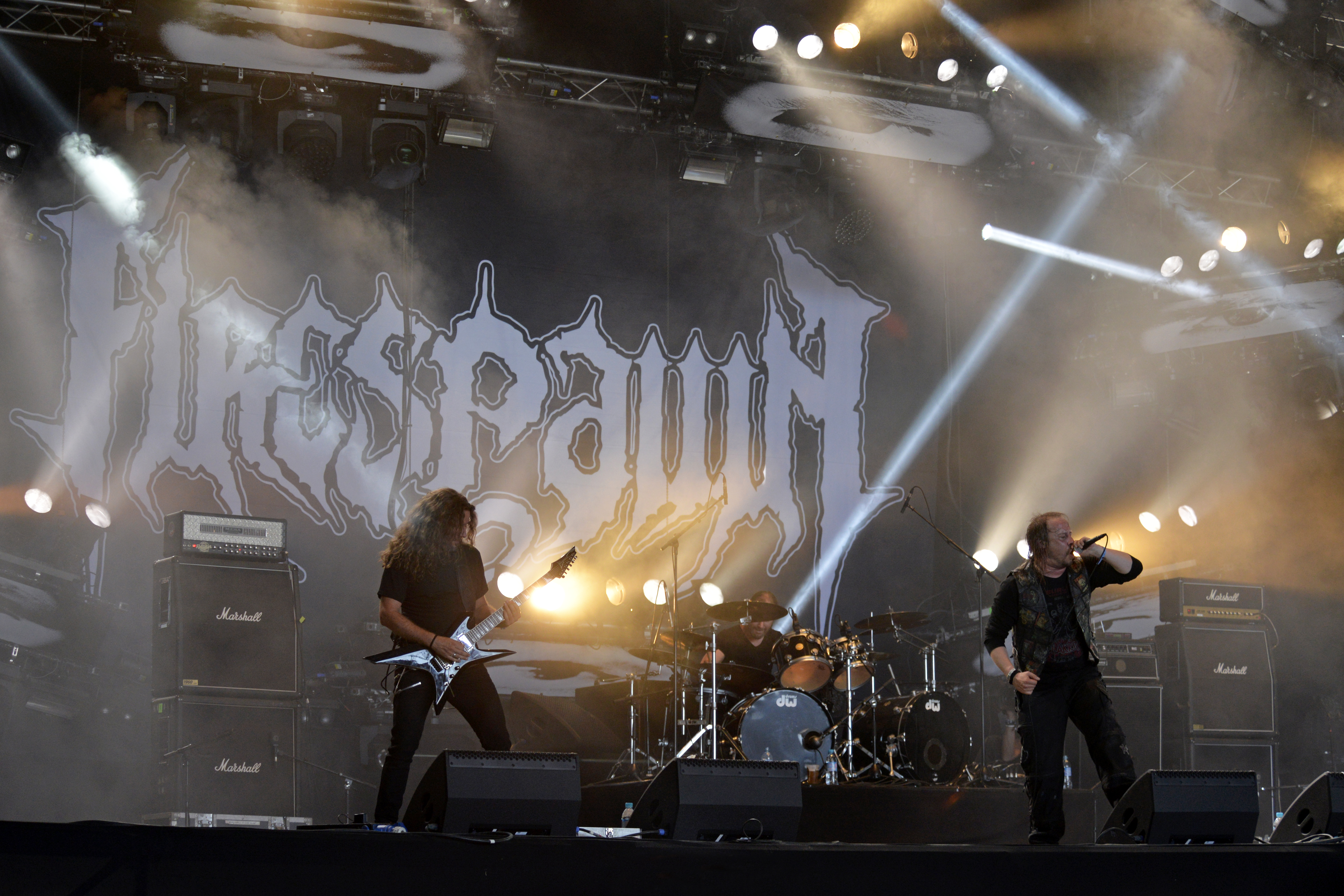
- Firespawn show at the 2017 Hellfest

Background information
- Also known as: Fireborn (2012–2015)
- Origin: Stockholm, Sweden
- Genres: Death metal
- Years active: 2012–2022; 2025–present
- Label: Century Media
- Members: Alex Impaler; Victor Brandt; Fredrik Folkare; Matte Modin; Jörgen Sandström
- Past members: Lars-Göran Petrov

Firespawn is a Swedish death metal band from Stockholm, formed in 2012 by Alex Impaler of Necrophobic, Lars-Göran Petrov and Victor Brandt, both of Entombed A.D. Originally called Fireborn, the group "wanted to play faster and harder death metal than in our other bands". The later addition of guitarist Fredrik Folkare of Unleashed and Necrophobic and drummer Matte Modin of Defleshed, completed the band's line-up.

On 7 August 2015, the debut 7" Lucifer Has Spoken was released. In November 2015, the band released their debut album, Shadow Realms, on Century Media. The music was written by Victor Brandt and the lyrics were written by both Alex Impaler and Victor Brandt.

On 28 April 2017, the band released their second studio album, entitled The Reprobate, again via Century Media. The band released its third album, Abominate in 2019 on Century Media.

On 7 March 2021, Petrov died from bile duct cancer at the age of 49.

On 11 July 2025, the band announced they had reunited and would be continuing with Jörgen Sandström taking over as vocalist following Petrov's death.

== Personnel ==
Current members

- Victor Brandt – guitar (2012–2022, 2025–present)
- Fredrik Folkare – guitar (2012–2022, 2025–present)
- Alex Impaler – bass (2012–2022, 2025–present)
- Matte Modin – drums (2012–2022, 2025–present)
- Jörgen Sandström – vocals (2025–present)

Former members

- Lars-Göran Petrov – vocals (2012–2021; his death)

Touring members

- Gustav Eriksson – guitar (2026)

== Discography ==
=== Studio albums ===
Title	Details	Peak chart positions
Title	Details	SWI
Shadow Realms	Released: 13 November 2015; Label: Century Media; Formats: CD, LP, digital download	—
The Reprobate	Released: 28 April 2017; Label: Century Media; Formats: CD	—
Abominate	Released: 7 June 2019; Label: Century Media; Formats: CD, download, streaming	83
"—" denotes a recording that did not chart or was not released in that territory.

=== Singles ===
- "Lucifer Has Spoken" (7", 2015)
