= The Shadowthrone =

Studio album by Satyricon
- Released: September 12, 1994
- Recorded: May 1994
- Studio: Waterfall Studios
- Genre: Black metal
- Length: 48:58
- Label: Moonfog
- Producer: Satyr

Satyricon chronology
| Dark Medieval Times (1993) | The Shadowthrone (1994) | Nemesis Divina (1996) |

Professional ratings
Review scores
| Source | Rating |
|---|---|
| AllMusic | 4/5 stars |

The Shadowthrone is the second studio album by the Norwegian black metal band Satyricon. It was released on September 12, 1994, by Moonfog Productions. A newly remastered version was released on May 28, 2021, with different artwork.

== Style ==
The band has described The Shadowthrone as "an atmospheric and symphonic album with a strong Nordic touch. There are fewer acoustic guitars and medieval influences, and it is harsher and grimmer than the debut Dark Medieval Times, but it still maintains the atmosphere set forth in their debut album."

== Track listing ==
All tracks are written by Satyr.

| No. | Title | Length |
|---|---|---|
| 1. | "Hvite Krists død" ("White Christ's Death") | 8:27 |
| 2. | "In the Mist by the Hills" | 8:01 |
| 3. | "Woods to Eternity" | 6:13 |
| 4. | "Vikingland" ("Land of Vikings") | 5:14 |
| 5. | "Dominions of Satyricon" | 9:25 |
| 6. | "The King of the Shadowthrone" | 6:14 |
| 7. | "I en svart kiste" ("In a Black Coffin") | 5:24 |
| Total length: | | 48:58 |

== Personnel ==
Satyricon

- Satyr (Sigurd Wongraven) – vocals, guitar, keyboards on "I en svart kiste", album photos, logos and design, production
- Frost (Kjetil-Vidar Haraldstad) – drums, album logos
- Samoth (Tomas Thormodsæter Haugen) – bass guitar, guitar

Session

- S. S. (Steinar Sverd Johnsen) – keyboards, piano

Production

- B. E. L. – sleeve photos
- K. Moen – engineering
- Vofagem – sleeve design

== Charts ==
Chart performance for The Shadowthrone
| Chart (2021) | Peak position |
|---|---|
| German Albums (Offizielle Top 100) | 69 |
