= The Age of Nero =

Studio album by Satyricon
- Released: 3 November 2008
- Recorded: May 2008 at Sound City Studios, Van Nuys, California, USA
- Genre: Black metal, black 'n' roll
- Length: 42:43
- Label: Roadrunner
- Producer: Satyr

Satyricon chronology
My Skin Is Cold (2008)	The Age of Nero (2008)	Satyricon (2013)

Professional ratings
Review scores
Source	Rating
About.com	3.5/5 stars
AllMusic	3.5/5 stars
Chronicles of Chaos	8.5/10

The Age of Nero is the seventh studio album by black metal band Satyricon. It was released on 3 November 2008, through Roadrunner Records. The release was backed by a full European headlining tour opening in Stavanger, Norway on 12 November and ending in Hamburg, Germany on 20 December.

== Background ==
Most of the album was written in a forest cabin, with the collaboration of Snorre Ruch (Thorns). It was recorded at Sound City Studios in Van Nuys, California, the place where Metallica had recorded Death Magnetic and most famously, where Nirvana had recorded Nevermind.

On 6 October 2008, the first single, "Black Crow on a Tombstone", was released for online streaming at Roadrunner Records' UK website.

== Track listing ==
All tracks are written by Sigurd "Satyr" Wongraven.

No.	Title	Length
1.	"Commando"	4:29
2.	"The Wolfpack"	4:05
3.	"Black Crow on a Tombstone"	3:52
4.	"Die by My Hand"	7:07
5.	"My Skin Is Cold" (album version)	5:15
6.	"The Sign of the Trident"	6:58
7.	"Last Man Standing"	3:40
8.	"Den siste" ("The Last")	7:24

European Limited Edition bonus disc tracks
No.	Title	Length
9.	"My Skin Is Cold (EP Version)"	5:07
10.	"Live Through Me"	5:12
11.	"Existential Fear-Questions"	6:01
12.	"Repined Bastard Nation (Live from Gjallarhorn)"	5:49
13.	"Mother North (Live from Gjallarhorn)"	9:06
14.	"The Pentagram Burns (Radio Edit)"	4:03
15.	"Last Man Standing (Guitar Wall Mix)"	3:38
16.	"Den Siste (Analog Mix)"	7:22
17.	"K.I.N.G. (Video)"	3:33
18.	"The Pentagram Burns (Video)"	4:05

== Personnel ==
=== Satyricon ===
- Satyr (Sigurd Wongraven) – vocals, guitars, keyboards, effects, arrangement, production
- Frost (Kjetil-Vidar Haraldstad) – drums

=== Additional personnel ===
- Snorre Ruch – guitars
- Windhfyr – keyboards, choir on tracks 1–4
- Erik Ljunggren – additional effects
- Victor Brandt – bass guitar
- Eirik Devold, Terje Midtgård, Øivind Westby – trombone
- Thomas Røisland – tuba
- Andrew John Smith, Arild Rohde, Bjørn Bugge, Christian Lyder Marstrander, Kjell Viig, Sturla Flem Rinvik – choir on tracks 1–4

=== Production ===
- Snorre Ruch – arrangement
- Joe Barresi – engineering, mixing
- Josh Smith, Lars Klokkerhuag, Erik Ljunggren, Rail Jon Rogut – engineers
- Jun Murakawa – mixing assistance
- Brian Gardner – mastering

== Charts ==
Chart (2008)	Peak position
Finnish Albums Chart	30
French Albums Chart	136
German Albums Chart	73
Norwegian Albums Chart	5
Swedish Albums Chart	26
U.S. Top Heatseekers Chart	18
