= Dark Medieval Times =

Studio album by Satyricon
- Released: October 25, 1993
- Recorded: August–September 1993
- Studio: Nesodden Musikkverksted
- Genre: Black metal
- Length: 43:27
- Label: Moonfog
- Producer: Satyr

Satyricon chronology
The Forest Is My Throne (1993)	Dark Medieval Times (1993)	The Shadowthrone (1994)

Professional ratings
Review scores
Source	Rating
AllMusic	4/5 stars

Dark Medieval Times is the debut studio album by Norwegian black metal band Satyricon. It was recorded in August and September 1993 and released on October 25, 1993, through Moonfog Productions. In May 2021, Satyricon reissued the album, remastered with different artwork.

== Track listing ==
All songs written by Satyr.

No.	Title	Length
1.	"Walk the Path of Sorrow"	8:18
2.	"Dark Medieval Times"	8:11
3.	"Skyggedans" ("Shadowdance")	3:55
4.	"Min hyllest til vinterland" (My Tribute to the Winterland (Instrumental)	4:29
5.	"Into the Mighty Forest"	6:18
6.	"The Dark Castle in the Deep Forest"	6:22
7.	"Taakeslottet" ("The Fogcastle")	5:54

== Personnel ==
Satyricon

- Satyr (Sigurd Wongraven) – vocals, guitar and bass guitar
- Frost (Kjetil-Vidar Haraldstad) – drums
- Lemarchand (Håvard Jørgensen) – guitars (uncredited)

Session

- Torden – keyboards

== Charts ==
Chart performance for Dark Medieval Times
Chart (2021)	Peak position
German Albums (Offizielle Top 100)	53
