= Dead Dawn =

Studio album by Entombed A.D.
- Released: 16 February 2016
- Recorded: Big Island Sound, Studio Supa
- Genre: Death metal, death 'n' roll
- Length: 40:45
- Label: Century Media
- Producer: Nico Elgstrand, Jacob Hellner, Tom van Heesch

Entombed A.D. chronology
Back to the Front (2014)	Dead Dawn (2016)	Bowels Of Earth (2019)

Professional ratings
Review scores
Source	Rating
AllMusic	3.5/5 stars
Blabbermouth.net	8.5/10 stars
Metal Injection	8/10 stars

Dead Dawn is the second studio album by Swedish death metal band Entombed A.D. It was released on 16 February 2016 through Century Media Records.

== Track listing ==
No.	Title	Length
1.	"Midas in Reverse"	3:55
2.	"Dead Dawn"	4:07
3.	"Down to Mars to Ride"	4:50
4.	"As the World Fell"	5:30
5.	"Total Death"	2:58
6.	"The Winner Has Lost"	3:53
7.	"Silent Assassin"	3:55
8.	"Hubris Fall"	4:49
9.	"Black Survival"	3:08
10.	"Not What It Seems"	3:40
Total length:		40:45

Limited digipak bonus cassette
No.	Title	Length
1.	"Dead Dawn" (Demo 2015 Version)	4:31
2.	"Black Survival" (Demo 2015 Version)	2:56
3.	"Maul ‘em Mash And Maim" (Demo 2015 Version)	4:03
4.	"Total Death" (Demo 2015 Version)	4:05

== Personnel ==
=== Entombed A.D. ===
- Nico Elgstrand – guitars, vocals
- Olle Dahlstedt – drums
- Lars-Göran Petrov – vocals
- Victor Brandt – bass, vocals

=== Guest musician ===
- Anders Wikström – backing vocals (tracks 3, 4)

=== Production ===
- Tom van Heesch – recording, mixing, co-producer (tracks 3, 4, 6)
- Jacob Hellner – producer (tracks 3, 4, 6)
- Erik Danielsson, Trident Arts – artwork
- Sara Gewalt – photography
- Nico Elgstrand – recording, producer (tracks 1, 2, 5, 7–10)
- Svante Forsbäck – mastering
- Carsten Drescher – layout
