= Hellfire (1349 album) =

Studio album by 1349
- Released: 24 May 2005
- Recorded: Studio Studio Nyhagen
- Genre: Black metal
- Length: 52:04
- Label: Candlelight
- Producer: 1349 and Ronni Le Tekrø

1349 chronology
Beyond the Apocalypse (2004)	Hellfire (2005)	Revelations of the Black Flame (2009)

Professional ratings
Review scores
Source	Rating
AllMusic	3.5/5 stars
Blabbermouth.net	8.5/10
Chronicles of Chaos	8/10
Stylus Magazine	B

Hellfire is the third studio album by Norwegian black metal band 1349. It was released on 24 May 2005 through Candlelight Records.

A music video was produced for the track "Sculptor of Flesh". The video, directed by Judd Tilyard, alternates between footage of the band performing the song in Norway and clips of surgery filmed in Australia. The closing track of the album, "Hellfire", was intentionally recorded at 13:49 in length to spell out the band name.

== Track listing ==
1. "I Am Abomination" – 4:09
2. "Nathicana" – 4:38
3. "Sculptor of Flesh" – 3:17
4. "Celestial Deconstruction" – 7:44
5. "To Rottendom" – 5:51
6. "From the Deeps" – 6:25
7. "Slaves to Slaughter" – 6:11
8. "Hellfire" – 13:49

== Personnel ==
- Archaon – guitar
- Tjalve – guitar
- Frost – drums
- Seidemann – bass guitar
- Ravn – vocals

=== Production ===
- 1349 – production
- Ronni Le Tekrø – production
- Kjartan Hesthagen – engineering
