= Liberation (1349 album) =

Studio album by 1349
- Released: 15 February 2003
- Recorded: February–March 2002 at Gordon Studios
- Genre: Black metal
- Length: 38:28
- Label: Candlelight
- Producer: Ravn

1349 chronology
Liberation (2003)	Beyond the Apocalypse (2004)

Professional ratings
Review scores
Source	Rating
AllMusic	3/5 stars

Liberation is the debut studio album by Norwegian black metal band 1349. It was released on 15 February 2003 through Candlelight Records.

== Track listing ==
1. "Manifest" – 4:05
2. "I Breathe Spears" – 4:26
3. "Riders of the Apocalypse" – 4:36
4. "Deathmarch" – 1:07
5. "Pitch Black" – 3:20
6. "Satanic Propaganda" – 3:44
7. "Legion" – 4:56
8. "Evil Oath" – 3:48
9. "Liberation" – 5:21
10. "Buried by Time and Dust" (Mayhem cover, bonus track) – 3:05

== Personnel ==
- Archaon – guitar
- Tjalve – guitar
- Frost – drums
- Seidemann – bass
- Ravn – vocals
- Thomas Sorlie – engineering
- Charlotte Hakonsen – cover concept, artwork
