= Ten Horns – Ten Diadems =

Ten Horns - Ten Diadems

Greatest hits album by Satyricon
- Released: 2002
- Genre: Black metal
- Length: 1:04:04
- Label: Moonfog

Ten Horns – Ten Diadems is a compilation album by the Norwegian black metal band Satyricon. It was recorded at Moonfog Studios

== Track listing ==
1. "Filthgrinder" – 6:42
2. "Dominions of Satyricon" – 9:26 (Remastered)
3. "Forhekset" – 4:31
4. "Night of Divine Power" – 5:49 (Remastered)
5. "Hvite Krists Død" – 8:29
6. "Mother North" – 6:25
7. "Supersonic Journey" – 7:48
8. "Taakeslottet" – 5:52 (Remastered)
9. "Serpent's Rise" – 3:20
10. "Repined Bastard Nation" – 5:42
