= K.I.N.G. =

"K.I.N.G"

Single by Satyricon

from the album Now, Diabolical
- B-side: "Storm (of the Destroyer)"
- Released: 3 April 2006
- Genre: Black metal
- Length: 3:36
- Label: Century Media
- Songwriter: Satyr

Music video
- King at Youtube.com

"K. I. N. G" is a single by Norwegian black metal band Satyricon, from their 2006 album Now, Diabolical. The single was released on 3 April 2006, limited to 1,000 copies and for the Norwegian market only. The song and accompanying video saw limited airplay in the US on MTV's Headbangers Ball.

== Track listing ==
1. "K. I. N. G" – 3:36
2. "Storm (of the Destroyer)" – 2:48

== Personnel ==
=== Satyricon ===
- Satyr (Sigurd Wongraven) – vocals, guitar, keyboards
- Frost (Kjetil-Vidar Haraldstad) – drums

=== Session ===
- Lars K. Norberg – bass guitar

== Chart performance ==
Chart (2006)	Peak position
Norway (VG-lista)	7
