= Demonoir =

Studio album by 1349
- Released: 26 April 2010
- Genre: Black metal
- Length: 48:54
- Label: Indie, Prosthetic (US)
- Producer: Ravn, Thomas Gabriel Fischer, Archaon

1349 chronology
| Revelations of the Black Flame (2009) | Demonoir (2010) | Massive Cauldron of Chaos (2014) |

Demonoir is the fifth full-length album by Norwegian black metal band 1349. The new album shows "a return to the band's more traditional, raw-yet-technical black metal sound." It was released on 26 April 2010 in Europe and the day after in North America.

== Background ==
Ravn, 1349's lead singer, stated that most of Demonoir was written and rehearsed over the course of a few months. Archaon, the guitarist, was the main songwriter, but the other members helped arrange and structure the tracks. Demonoir was co-produced by Thomas Gabriel Fischer (along with Ravn and Archeon) and was recorded at Studio Nyhagen in Norway.

Demonoir features a return to 1349's old style compared to its more experimental predecessor, Revelations of the Black Flame. Critics characterized Demonoir as having traditional aspects of black metal, including fast tempos, a "razor-wire guitar sound", and an overall aggressive sound. The songs on Demonoir are separated by ambient interludes, all named "Tunnel of Set".

== Release and reception ==
Professional ratings
Review scores
| Source | Rating |
|---|---|
| About.com | 4.5/5 stars |
| Allmusic | 4.5/5 stars |
| Blabbermouth.net | 8/10 stars |
| Blistering | 8.5/10 stars |
| Lords of Metal | 8.5/10 stars |
| Metal Forge | 9.5/10 stars |
| Metal Review | 8.5/10 stars |
| Sputnikmusic | 4/5 stars |

Demonoir was released on April 26, 2010 in Europe via Indie Recordings, and one day later in North America via Prosthetic Records. Along with the standard release, a limited digipack version and a double 180-gram vinyl version of Demonoir were released, both of which contained covers of songs along with the album.

Demonoir received generally positive reviews from critics, who noted that it was a return to form after the mixed reception of Revelations of the Black Flame. Justin M. Norton stated in an About.com review that Demonoir showed "why [1349] are one of the most important Norwegian black metal bands". Phil Freeman wrote in an AllMusic review that Demonoir "will almost certainly please longtime fans who found Revelations [the album preceding Demonoir] to be a weird stylistic left turn, but it's also a good introduction to 1349". Scott Alisoglu in a Blabbermouth review considered the album "a vicious, unnerving, and terrifically teeth-rattling return to form" for 1349. Tom Findlay wrote in Blistering: "Demonoir casts its net somewhere between Mayhem, Aborym, Gorgoroth and Immortal, but successfully carves its own idiosyncratic niche and personality".

== Track listing ==
1. "Tunnels of Set I" – 1:04 (Ravn, Archaon)
2. "Atomic Chapel" – 6:24 (Destroyer, Archaon)
3. "Tunnel II" – 1:01 (Ravn, Archaon)
4. "When I Was Flesh" – 5:45 (Destroyer, Archaon)
5. "Tunnel III" – 0:39 (Ravn, Archaon)
6. "Psalm 7:77" – 5:42 (Destroyer, Archaon)
7. "Tunnel IV" – 1:02 (Ravn, Archaon)
8. "Pandemonium War Bells" – 7:48 (Destroyer, Archaon, Frost, Seidemann)
9. "Tunnel V" – 1:15 (Ravn, Archaon)
10. "The Devil of the Desert" – 6:30 (Archaon, Seidemann)
11. "Tunnel VI" – 1:32 (Ravn, Archaon)
12. "Demonoir" – 6:19 (Frost, Archaon)
13. "Tunnel VII" – 3:53 (Ravn, Archaon)

=== Limited edition bonus disc ===
1. "Rapture" (Morbid Angel cover)
2. "Strike of the Beast" (Exodus cover)
3. "Nerves" (Bauhaus cover)

=== Limited boxset bonus disc ===
1. "Rapture" (Morbid Angel cover)
2. "Strike of the Beast" (Exodus cover)
3. "Nerves" (Bauhaus cover)
4. "The Heretic" (Possessed cover)
5. "Pandemonium War Bells" (live)
6. "When I Was Flesh" (live)
7. "Atomic Chapel" (live)

== Personnel ==
According to AllMusic:

=== 1349 ===
- Ravn – vocals, sampling, production
- Archaon – guitars
- Seidemann – bass, backing vocals
- Frost – drums

=== Additional personnel ===
- b9, Ash in Plastic Bag, Gutta På Loftet Productions – additional sampling
- Tony Caputo – piano
- Ronni Le Tekrø – lead guitar on "Psalm 7:77", backing vocals
- Thorbjørn "Tobben" Benjaminsen – horns
- 1349 – arrangement
- Archaon – production
- Thomas Gabriel Fischer – production
- Kjartan Hesthagen – engineering
- Kjetil Ottersen – mastering
