= Beyond the Apocalypse =

Studio album by 1349
- Released: 19 April 2004
- Recorded: 2003
- Studio: Nyhagen Studios
- Genre: Black metal
- Length: 47:32
- Label: Candlelight
- Producer: 1349

1349 chronology
| Liberation (2003) | Beyond the Apocalypse (2004) | Hellfire (2005) |

Beyond the Apocalypse is the second studio album by Norwegian black metal band 1349. It was released in 2004 through Candlelight Records.

== Track listing ==
- All songs published by Tanglade Music/Abstract Sounds.
1. "Chasing Dragons" – 6:31 (Ravn, Archaon)
2. "Beyond the Apocalypse" – 4:01 (Ravn, Archaon, Tjalve)
3. "Aiwass-Aeon" – 3:32 (Ravn, Archaon, Tjalve, Seidemann)
4. "Nekronatalenheten" – 4:30 (Ravn, Archaon, Tjalve, Seidemann)
5. "Perished in Pain" – 3:57 (Ravn, Archaon, Tjalve, Seidemann)
6. "Singer of Strange Songs" – 7:30 (Archaon, Tjalve, Seidemann)
7. "Blood Is the Mortar" – 3:52 (Archaon, Destroyer, Tjalve, Frost)
8. "Internal Winter" – 7:41 (Archaon, Tjalve, Seidemann)
9. "The Blade" – 5:58 (Ravn, Tjalve, Seidemann)

== Personnel ==
1349

- Ravn – vocals, drums ("The Blade")
- Archaon – guitar
- Tjalve – guitar
- Seidemann – bass, harmonium
- Frost – drums

Production

- Ronni Le Tekrø – executive production
- 1349 – arrangement, production
- Ravn – production
- Kjartan Hesthagen – recording, engineering
- Dr. Davidsen – recording, engineering
- Tom Kvallsvoll – mastering

== Critical reception ==
Professional ratings
Review scores
| Source | Rating |
|---|---|
| AllMusic | 3/5 stars |

AllMusic's Alex Henderson called the album a "nasty, harsh, brutally skullcrushing blast of Scandinavian death metal/black metal that lacks even the slightest trace of subtlety".
