= Victor Brandt (musician) =

Swedish guitarist and bassist

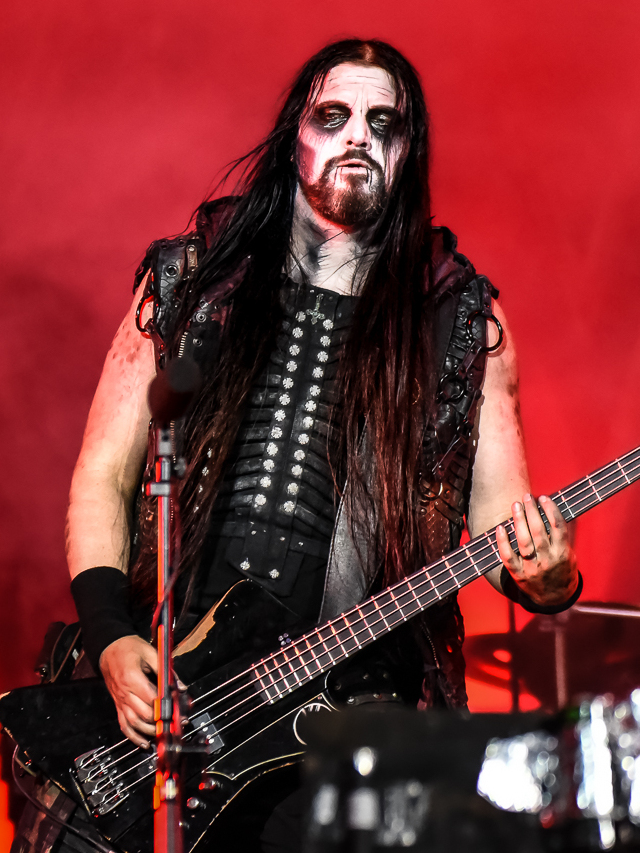
- Brandt performing with Dimmu Borgir in 2025

Background information
- Born: December 18, 1983 (age 42)
- Genres: Death metal; black metal; symphonic black metal; hardcore punk
- Occupation: Musician
- Instruments: Bass; guitar
- Member of: Dimmu Borgir; Firespawn; Witchery; Cemetery Skyline
- Formerly of: Satyricon; Aeon; Entombed; Entombed A.D.; Akani

Victor Brandt (born 18 December 1983) is a Swedish musician who is the touring bassist for Norwegian symphonic black metal band Dimmu Borgir, bassist for Witchery, bassist for Cemetery Skyline, and a guitarist for Firespawn. He previously played bass for the death metal and black metal bands Entombed, Entombed A.D., and Satyricon, among others.

== Career ==
Brandt was bassist for Swedish hardcore punk band Totalt Jävla Mörker ("Total Fucking Darkness" in English) since 2004. He also formed a side project called Dominion, in which he performed as guitarist, bassist and vocalist, alongside drummer Jocke Olafsson (formerly of In Aternum).

Brandt started playing with Norwegian black metal band Satyricon in 2008 as session and touring member before departing in 2009. Following this, he joined Aeon, replacing Max Carlberg, although he had departed by 2010, with guitarists Zeb Nilsson and Daniel Dlimi playing bass on Path of Fire.

He joined Swedish death metal band Entombed in September 2010, taking bass duties from Nico Elgstrand who moved onto second guitar. He played with Entombed until 2014 when the band went on hiatus due to legal battles between founding members Lars-Göran Petrov and Alex Helid. He followed Petrov, Elgstrand and drummer Olle Dahlstedt in forming a new band called Entombed A.D.

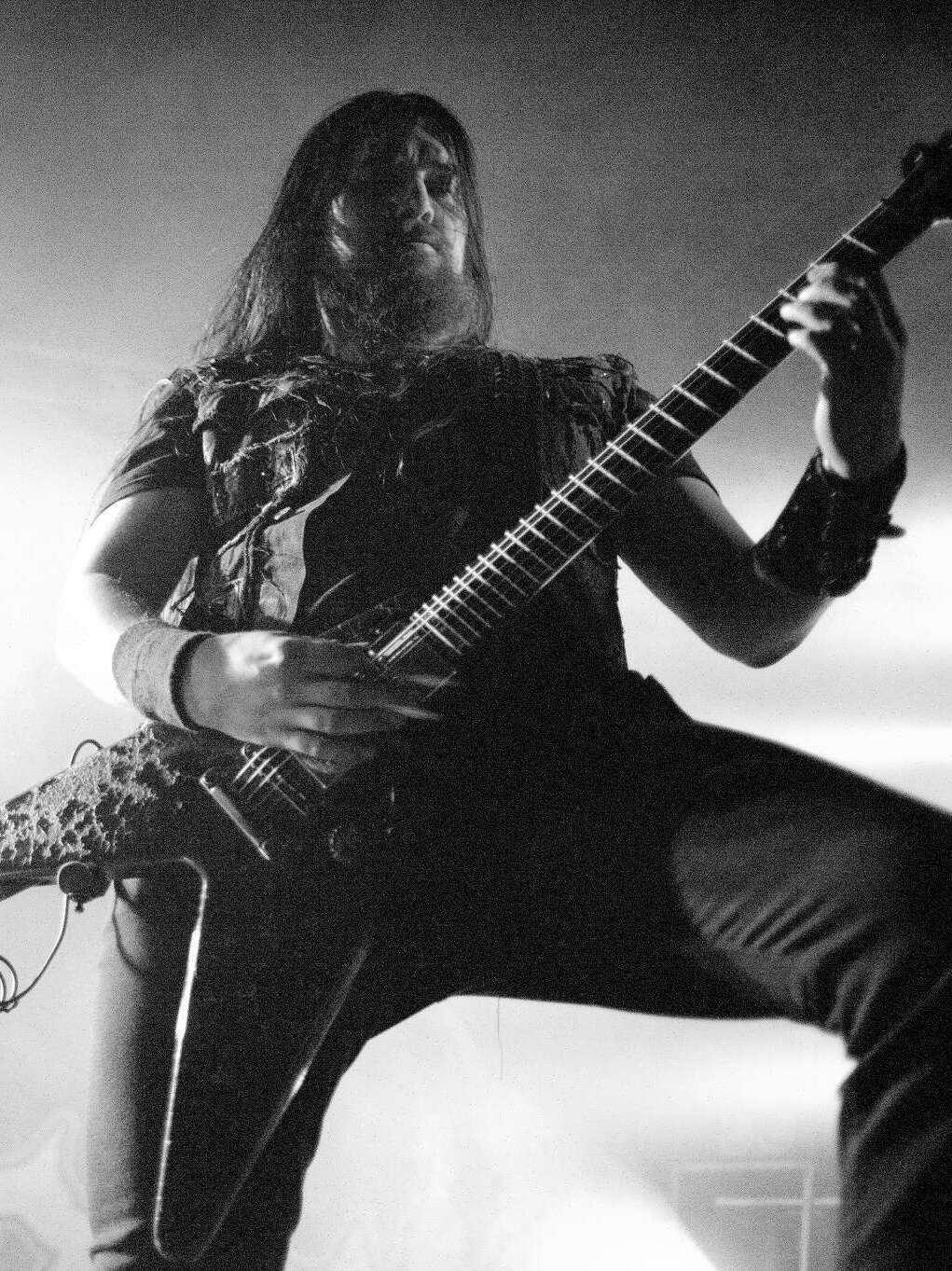
Brandt playing guitar with Firespawn in 2016

While Entombed were still active, he co-founded death metal band Firespawn as guitarist alongside Necrophobic bassist Alex Friberg. The two recruited Entombed vocalist L-G Petrov as well as guitarist Fredrik Folkare of Unleashed and Necrophobic and drummer Matte Modin of Defleshed. Him and Friberg as the band's main composers. Firespawn were inactive from Petrov's death in 2021, until they returned in July 2025 with new vocalist Jörgen Sandström (Grave and ex-Entombed).

In 2012, he became a member of hardcore punk/death metal supergroup Akani, featuring vocalist Jorge Rosado (Merauder), guitarists Anders Björler (At the Gates) and Daniel Antonsson (Dimension Zero), and drummer Anders Lowgren (Dead Reprise). They have released one album, and have toured Europe.

While still in Entombed A.D. he played with American death metal band Six Feet Under on the Hatefest tour in 2015, when regular bassist Jeff Hughell was unavailable. In 2018, Brandt departed Entombed A.D. to join Norwegian symphonic black metal band Dimmu Borgir who were playing their first show since 2012 that year. In 2022, he joined Witchery, replacing Sharlee D'Angelo (Arch Enemy, Mercyful Fate). He had previous played as a stand in for Witchery in 2017.

In October and November 2025, Brandt filled in with progressive metal band Amorphis on bass and backing vocals, while regular bassist Olli-Pekka Laine stayed home for family reasons.

== Discography ==
Year	Band	Title
2004	Totalt Jävla Mörker	Människans Ringa Värde
2006	Totalt Jävla Mörker	Totalt Jävla Mörker
2006	Totalt Jävla Mörker / Human Waste	Totalt Jävla Mörker / Human Waste
2006	Dominion	Born God And Aware
2008	Satyricon	My Skin Is Cold
2008	Satyricon	The Age Of Nero
2009	Totalt Jävla Mörker	Söndra & Härska
2011	Death Letters	Post-Historic
2012	Entombed	When In Sodom Revisited
2012	Entombed	"Amok"
2014	Entombed	"Bedlam Attack"
2014	Akani	Santa Muerte
2014	Entombed A.D.	Back To The Front
2015	Firespawn	Lucifer Has Spoken
2015	Firespawn	Shadow Realms
2016	Entombed A.D.	Dead Dawn
2017	Firespawn	The Reprobate
2019	Firespawn	Abominate
2022	Witchery	Nightside
