= Satyricon (band) =

Norwegian black metal band

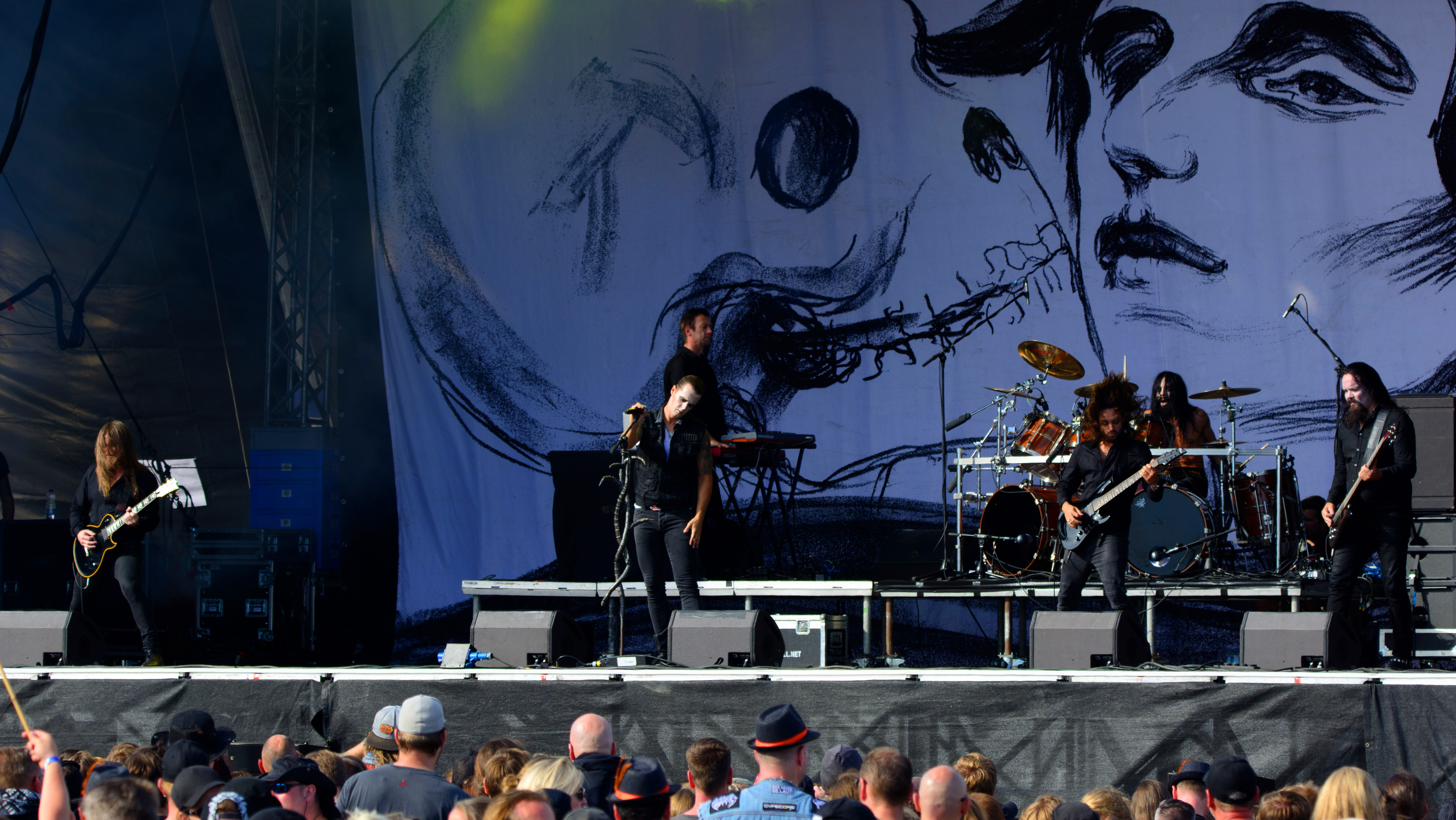
- The band performing in 2018

Background information
- Origin: Oslo, Norway
- Genre: Black metal
- Years active: 1991–present
- Labels: Moonfog; Century Media; Sony BMG; EMI; Napalm Records; Roadrunner
- Members: Satyr; Frost
- Past members: Kveldulv; Samoth; Exhurtum; Wargod; Lemarchand

Satyricon is a Norwegian black metal band formed in Oslo in 1991. Satyr and Frost have been the band's core members since 1993, and its only official members since 1997. The band's first three albums typify Norwegian black metal. Since its fourth album in 1999, the band has included elements of traditional heavy metal. Satyricon was the first Norwegian black metal band to join a multi-national record label (EMI).

== History ==
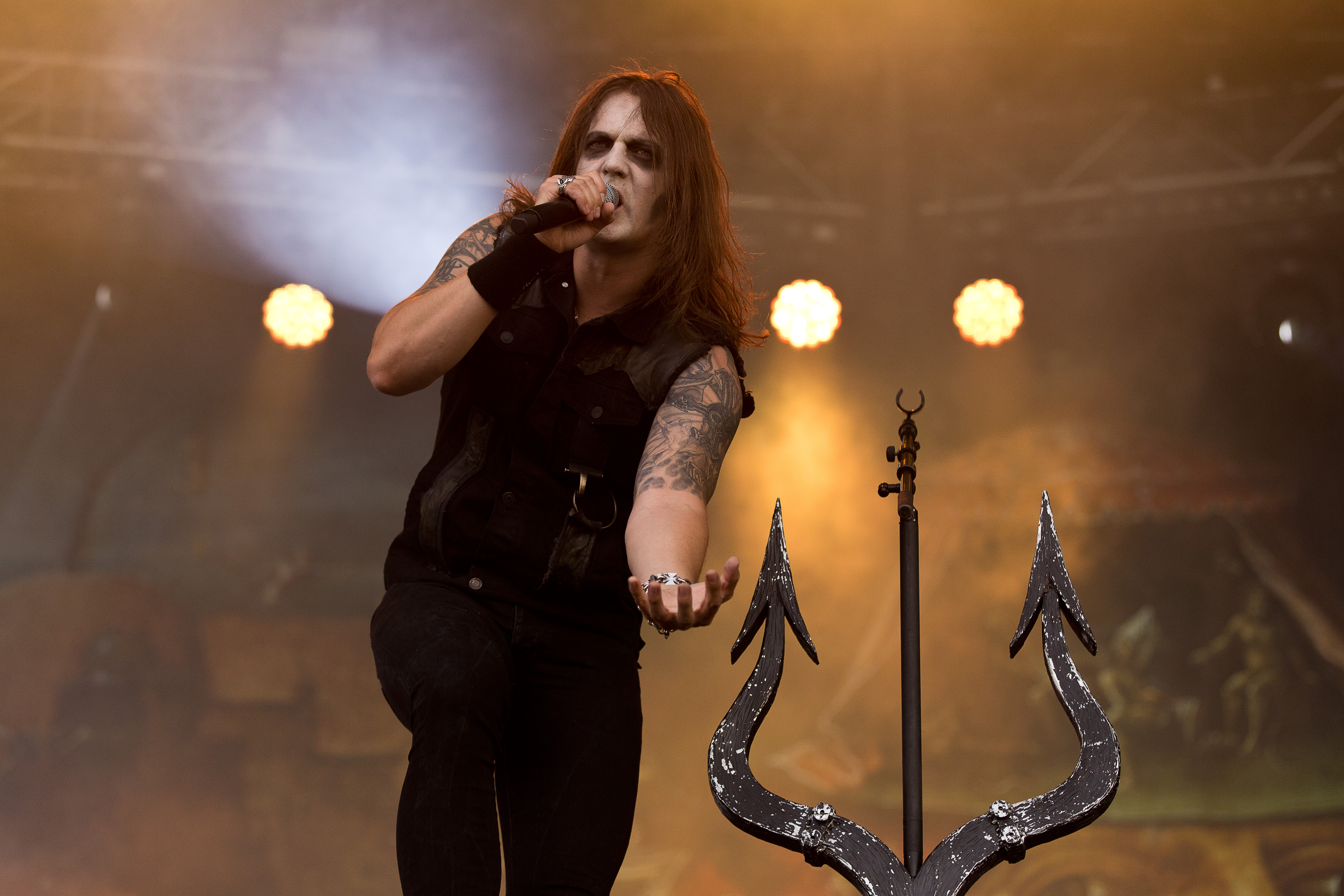
Sigurd "Satyr" Wongraven at Rockharz Open Air 2016 in Germany

Bassist Wargod and drummer Exhurtum formed the band in 1990 as Eczema. In 1991, they started playing black metal and changed the band name to Satyricon. Satyr (Sigurd Wongraven) joined the band. After the first demo, All Evil, Exhurtum was fired because he "preferred hanging out with [his] girl at the time rather than kicking down gravestones together with the band", while Wargod left the music scene and became a UN soldier. Satyr and Lemarchand hired session drummer Frost (Kjetil-Vidar Haraldstad) and recorded their second and last demo, The Forest Is My Throne. Before leaving the band, Lemarchand recorded guitars (uncredited) for the first album, Dark Medieval Times. In the meantime, Frost became a permanent member and recorded drums for the aforementioned album. Satyricon have been a two-man band except from 1993–1996, when Tomas Thormodsæter 'Samoth' Haugen from Emperor was the bassist and guitarist, and participated in their second album, The Shadowthrone; and later, in 1996, when Darkthrone member Nocturno Culto (Ted Skjellum, known as "Kveldulv" during Satyricon's period) played guitar on the third full-length Satyricon album, Nemesis Divina.

Satyricon released their fourth album, Rebel Extravaganza, in 1999. During this period, Satyr shaved off his hair, as seen in the album photos and their live performances at the time.

In April and May 2000, Satyricon toured supporting Pantera. Phil Anselmo has voiced his appreciation for black metal numerous times, and has participated in Eibon with Satyr. They were signed to Daron Malakian's label EatUrMusic.

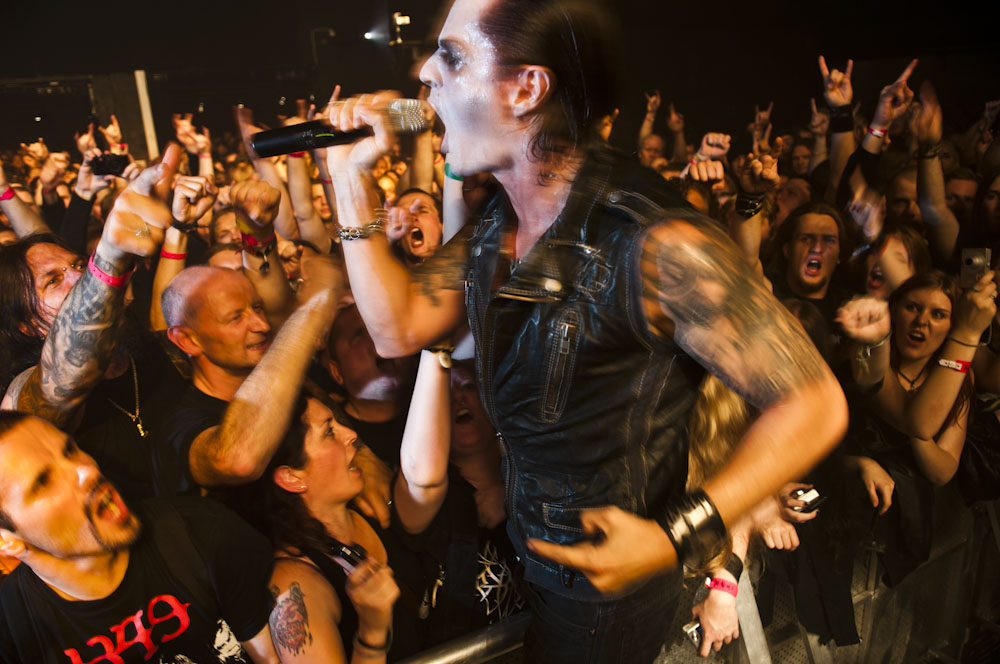
Satyricon performing live in 2011

They released their fifth studio album, Volcano, in 2002. It won the Norwegian Grammy for Best Metal Album, the Alarm Song of the Year award for "Fuel for Hatred", the Alarm Award for Metal Album of the Year, and The Oslo award for Best Overall Album.

Satyricon covered "Kathaarian Life Code" for the Darkthrone tribute Darkthrone Holy Darkthrone, which Moonfog Productions released in 1998. That year, Satyricon covered "Born for Burning" for In Conspiracy with Satan – A Tribute to Bathory, released by Hellspawn Records/No Fashion Records.

In 2006, Satyricon released Now, Diabolical.

In March 2008, the band headlined the Inferno Metal Festival in Oslo for the first time.

The band released the EP My Skin Is Cold before their seventh album, The Age of Nero, which they released on 3 November 2008.

Satyricon released their self-titled eighth album on 9 September 2013.

The band released their first full length live CD/DVD set, Live at the Opera, which took place in September 2013, alongside the Norwegian National Opera, on 4 May 2015.

A fully remastered 20th anniversary edition of 1996's Nemesis Divina was released on 20 May 2016.

According to Satyricon's official Facebook page, they entered the studio in March 2017 to record their ninth full-length studio album, Deep Calleth Upon Deep, which they completed in Summer 2017 and released on 22 September. Frost stated in interviews that once the album was released, they would complete work on their first covers album, Formative Oddities, though they had yet to announce its release date. The band revealed plans to release a new studio album with original material in 2022. This was pushed back to a May 2024 release, though the album did not surface by that point. As of 2026, it is unknown when a new studio album will be released. It will be their longest gap between studio albums when and if it is released.

On June 8, 2022, the band announced the soundtrack album Satyricon & Munch, which they would release digitally on June 10, with physical releases to follow in the future. The album features music created for the Satyricon & Munch exhibition held since April 29 at the Munch Museum in Oslo, Norway, celebrating Norwegian artist Edvard Munch.

== Musical style ==
The band's first album, 1993's Dark Medieval Times, showed off the fascination Satyricon had with the Middle Ages and featured raw black metal blast beats produced by Frost, mixed with acoustic guitar and flute. On their next album, The Shadowthrone, this medieval spirit was continued. Rock Hard journalist Wolf-Rüdiger Mühlmann wrote that Satyricon reached their "very early zenith" with that album and Nemesis Divina.

Describing their fifth studio album, 2002's Volcano, frontman Satyr stated in a press release and biography on their homepage that "the music is rock based but more extreme; it is black metal pushing the boundaries that began with bands like Venom and Bathory. Reinventing ourselves based on a foundation of rock-oriented black metal is our philosophy." Mühlmann wrote that Satyricon's path after their zenith was reached with their second and third album has only a limited connection to black metal, whereas Metal Hammer journalist Robert Müller described Satyr as a "latently arrogant guy who, along the way, makes great music that constantly tests the borders of the genre".

== Band members ==
=== Current members ===
- Sigurd "Satyr" Wongraven – vocals, guitars, keyboards, bass (1991–present)
- Kjetil-Vidar "Frost" Haraldstad – drums (1993–present)

=== Current live members ===
- Steinar "Azarak" Gundersen – guitars (1999–present)
- Anders Hunstad – keyboards (2011–present)
- Attila Vörös – guitars (2017–present)
- Ben Ash - guitars - (2024-present)
- Phil Pieters Smith - bass (2024–present)

=== Former members ===
- Ted "Kveldulv" Skjellum – guitars (1996–1997)
- Tomas "Samoth" Haugen – bass, guitars (1993–1996)
- Carl-Michael "Exhurtum" Eide – drums (1991–1992)
- Vegard "Wargod" Tønsberg Bakke – bass (1991–1992)
- Håvard "Lemarchand" Jørgensen – guitars, bass (1991–1993)

=== Former live members ===
- Frank Bello - bass (2024)
- Dirk Verbeuren – drums (2014)
- Silmaeth – bass (2011–2012)
- Anders Odden – bass (2009–2024)
- Brice Leclercq – bass (2009–2011)
- Gildas Le Pape – guitars (2008–2013; studio 2013)
- Victor Brandt – bass (live & studio 2008)
- Schoft – guitars (2007)
- Trym Torson – drums (2004)
- Joey Jordison – drums (2004; died 2021)
- Jonna "Windhfyr"Nikula – keyboards (2003–2011)
- Ivar Bjørnson – keyboards (2003)
- Lars K. Norberg – bass (2002–2007)
- Arnt Ove "A.O Grønbech" Grønbech – guitars (2002–2007)
- Terje "Cyrus" Andersen – guitars (2000–2002)
- Kine Hult – keyboards (2000–2002)
- Jan Erik "Tyr" Tiwaz – bass (2000)
- Morten "Sanrabb" Furuly – guitars (1999)
- Terje Vik "Tchort" Shei – guitars (1997–1999)
- Daniel "Død" Olaisen – guitars (1996–1999)
- Richard "Daimon" Cabeza – bass (1997)
- Kenneth "Destroyer"/"Svartalv" Skibrek Halvorsen – bass (1996)

=== Recording ===
Album	Vocals	Rhythm guitar	Lead guitar	Bass	Drums	Keyboards
All Evil	Satyr	Lemarchand		Wargod	Exhurtum	none
The Forest is My Throne	Satyr	Satyr	Lemarchand	Satyr	Frost	none
Dark Medieval Times	Satyr	Satyr	Lemarchand	Satyr	Frost	Torden
The Shadowthrone	Satyr	Satyr		Samoth	Frost	S.S
Nemesis Divina	Satyr	Kveldulv	Satyr		Frost	Gerlioz
Rebel Extravaganza	Satyr	Satyr Anders Odden (3 tracks)	Satyr Anders Odden (1 track); Snorre Ruch (3 tracks)	Satyr	Frost	Satyr Gerlioz (1 track)
Volcano	Satyr	Satyr			Frost	Erik Ljunggren
Now, Diabolical	Satyr	Satyr		Lars K. Norberg	Frost	Satyr
My Skin is Cold	Satyr	Satyr (3 tracks) A. O. Grønbech (2 tracks)	Satyr (3 tracks) Steinar Gundersen (2 tracks)	Victor Brandt (1 track) Satyr (2 tracks); Lars K. Norberg (2 tracks)	Frost	Satyr (3 tracks) Jonna Nikula (2 tracks)
The Age of Nero	Satyr	Satyr	Snorre Ruch	Victor Brandt	Frost	Satyr Windhfyr
Satyricon	Satyr Sivert Høyem (1 track)	Satyr	Gildas Le Pape	Satyr	Frost	Satyr Erik Ljunggren
Live at the Opera	Satyr	Gildas Le Pape	Steinar Gundersen	Anders Odden	Frost	Anders Hunstad
Deep Calleth Upon Deep	Satyr	Anders Odden	Satyr	Anders Odden	Frost	Satyr
Satyricon & Munch	none	Satyr			Frost	Satyr

== Discography ==
=== Studio albums ===
Title	Album details	Peak chart positions										Sales	Certifications
Title	Album details	NOR	BEL (Fl)	BEL (Wa)	FIN	FRA	GER	SWE	SWI	UK	UK Rock & Metal	Sales	Certifications
Dark Medieval Times	Released: 25 October 1993; Label: Moonfog; Formats: CD, CS, LP, download	—	—	—	—	—	53	—	—	—	—		
The Shadowthrone	Released: 12 September 1994; Label: Moonfog; Formats: CD, CS, LP, download	—	—	—	—	—	69	—	—	—	—		
Nemesis Divina	Released: 22 April 1996; Label: Moonfog, Century Media; Formats: CD, CS, LP, download	—	107	—	—	—	71	—	—	—	—		
Rebel Extravaganza	Released: 6 September 1999; Label: Moonfog, Nuclear Blast; Formats: CD, CS, LP, download	32	—	—	27	—	—	—	—	—	—		
Volcano	Released: 25 October 2002; Label: Moonfog, Capitol, eatURmusic; Formats: CD, LP, download	4	—	—	—	—	—	—	—	—	—	US: 15,000+	
Now, Diabolical	Released: 17 April 2006; Label: Roadrunner, Century Media, Columbia; Formats: CD, LP, download	2	—	—	28	—	—	47	—	195	7	NOR: 12,000+; US: 1,500+	
The Age of Nero	Released: 3 November 2008; Label: Koch, Roadrunner, Indie; Formats: CD, LP, download	5	—	—	30	136	73	26	—	156	8	NOR: 15,000+; US: 6,000+	NOR: Gold
Satyricon	Released: 9 September 2013; Label: Nuclear Blast, Roadrunner, Indie; Formats: CD, LP, download	1	108	148	6	132	37	18	47	129	10	US: 1,600+	
Deep Calleth Upon Deep	Released: 22 September 2017; Label: Moonfog, Napalm Records; Formats: CD, LP, download	7	61	84	17	152	20	36	25	—	18		
Satyricon & Munch	Released: 10 June 2022; Label: Napalm Records; Formats: CD, LP, download	—	—	—	—	—	—	—	72	—	—		
"—" denotes a recording that did not chart or was not released in that territory.

=== Compilation albums ===
Title	Album details
The Box Set	Released: 1998; Label: Moonfog; Formats: LP
Ten Horns – Ten Diadems	Released: 25 June 2002; Label: Moonfog; Formats: CD, download

=== Split albums ===
Title	Album details	Note
The Forest Is My Throne / Yggdrassil	Released: 1995; Label: Moonfog; Formats: CD	split with Enslaved

=== EPs ===
Title	Album details
Megiddo	Released: 13 June 1997; Label: Moonfog, Nuclear Blast; Formats: CD, LP, download
Intermezzo II	Released: 10 May 1999; Label: Moonfog, Nuclear Blast; Formats: CD, CS, LP, download
My Skin Is Cold	Released: 2 June 2008; Label: Roadrunner, Indie; Formats: LP+CD

=== Singles ===
Year	Single	Peak positions	Album
Year	Single	NOR	Album
2003	"Fuel for Hatred"	–	Volcano
2006	"K.I.N.G."	7	Now, Diabolical
2006	"The Pentagram Burns"	–	Now, Diabolical
2008	"Black Crow on a Tombstone"	–	The Age of Nero
2013	"Our World, It Rumbles Tonight"	–	Satyricon
2017	"Deep Calleth Upon Deep"	–	Deep Calleth Upon Deep
2017	"To Your Brethren in the Dark"	–	Deep Calleth Upon Deep
"—" denotes a recording that did not chart or was not released in that territory.

=== Demos ===
Title	Album details
All Evil	Released: 22 June 1992; Label: Self-released; Formats: CS
The Forest Is My Throne	Released: 1993; Label: Self-released; Formats: CS

=== Video albums ===
Title	Album details
Roadkill Extravaganza – A True Roadmovie	Released: 2001; Label: Moonfog; Formats: VHS, DVD
Live at the Opera	Released: 2015; Label: Napalm Records; Formats: CD, DVD

== Music videos ==
Year	Title	Director	Album
1996	"Mother North"	Sigurd "Satyr" Wongraven	Nemesis Divina
2002	"Fuel for Hatred"	Jonas Åkerlund	Volcano
2006	"K.I.N.G"	John Nothingworth	Now, Diabolical
2006	"The Pentagram Burns"	Håvard Arnstad	Now, Diabolical
2008	"Black Crow on a Tombstone"	Ove Heiborg, Fredrik Kiosterud	The Age of Nero
2013	"Phoenix"	–	Satyricon

A music video was made for "To Your Brethren in the Dark", directed by Laban Pheidias. The video (the first from the band in nine years), features American actresses Tonya Cornelisse, Jesse Hotchkiss, Diana Wyenn and Shawn Kathryn Kane.
