= The Infernal Pathway =

2019 studio album by 1349

Studio album by 1349
- Released: 18 October 2019
- Genre: Black metal
- Length: 44:02
- Label: Season of Mist
- Producer: Jarrett Pritchard

1349 chronology
Massive Cauldron of Chaos (2014)	The Infernal Pathway (2019)	The Wolf & the King (2024)

Singles from The Infernal Pathway
- 1. "Dødskamp" Released: 14 January 2019; 2. "Through Eyes of Stone" Released: 9 July 2019; 3. "Enter Cold Void Dreaming" Released: 31 July 2019; 4. "Striding the Chasm" Released: 3 September 2019

The Infernal Pathway is the seventh studio album by Norwegian black metal band 1349. It was released on 18 October 2019 through Season of Mist.

== Background ==
In February 2017, it was announced that 1349 had signed to Season of Mist and were in the process of writing their seventh studio album, which was set to be released in 2019. The first new single from the album, 'Dødskamp' was released digitally on 14 January 2019. The song was part of a compilation album inspired by the work of Norwegian artist Edvard Munch and released on the initiative of the Munch Museum. Guitarist Archaon called Munch one of the most important Norwegian artists, and stated that working on the song was emotionally difficult for the band.

The second single, "Through Eyes of Stone", was released on 9 July 2019. On 31 July 2019, it was revealed that the band's seventh studio album would be titled 'The Infernal Pathway', which was released on 18 October. On the same day, the third single, "Enter Cold Void Dreaming", was released. On 22 January 2020, a music video was released for the track. The video was directed by Aapo Lahtela and Vesa Ranta. The band released the album's fourth and final single, "Striding the Chasm", on 3 September.

== Track listing ==
All lyrics are written by Kenneth "Destroyer" Svartalv except where noted; all music is composed by Archaon.

The Infernal Pathway track listing
No.	Title	Lyrics	Length
1.	"Abyssos Antithesis"		5:30
2.	"Through Eyes of Stone"		3:24
3.	"Tunnel of Set VIII" (instrumental)		0:47
4.	"Enter Cold Void Dreaming"		3:58
5.	"Towers Upon Towers"		4:50
6.	"Tunnel of Set IX" (instrumental)		1:06
7.	"Deeper Still"		4:13
8.	"Striding the Chasm"		6:11
9.	"Dødskamp"	Ravn	5:01
10.	"Tunnel of Set X" (instrumental)		6:38
11.	"Stand Tall in Fire"		8:09
Total length:			44:02

Bonus track
No.	Title	Lyrics	Length
12.	"Dødskamp" (Norwegian Version)	Ravn	4:54

== Personnel ==
1349

- Ravn – vocals
- Seidemann – bass
- Archaon – guitars
- Frost – drums
