= Volcano (Satyricon album) =

Studio album by Satyricon
- Released: October 25, 2002
- Recorded: August–November 2001
- Genres: Black metal, heavy metal
- Length: 64:52
- Labels: Moonfog, Capitol
- Producer: Satyr

Satyricon chronology
Rebel Extravaganza (1999)	Volcano (2002)	Now, Diabolical (2006)

Professional ratings
Review scores
Source	Rating
AllMusic	3/5 stars
Chronicles of Chaos	8.5/10

Volcano is the fifth studio album by Norwegian black metal band Satyricon. It was released on October 25, 2002, through Moonfog Productions. The album is one of the band's more successful records, having won several awards including the Spellemannprisen for Best Metal Album, Alarm awards for Metal Album of the Year, Song of the Year for "Fuel for Hatred" and an Oslo award for Best Overall Album. A video was made for the single "Fuel for Hatred".

== Background ==
The beginning of the first track is a sample of Russell Crowe's dialogue from the movie Gladiator.

== Track listing ==
All tracks are written by Sigurd "Satyr" Wongraven.

No.	Title	Length
1.	"With Ravenous Hunger"	6:40
2.	"Angstridden"	6:23
3.	"Fuel for Hatred"	3:53
4.	"Suffering the Tyrants"	5:08
5.	"Possessed"	5:21
6.	"Repined Bastard Nation"	5:44
7.	"Mental Mercury"	6:53
8.	"Black Lava"	14:29

Vinyl bonus tracks
No.	Title	Length
9.	"Live Through Me"	4:47
10.	"Existential Fear-Questions"	5:34

== Personnel ==
=== Satyricon ===
- Satyr (Sigurd Wongraven) – vocals, guitar, bass guitar, arrangement, production, recording, engineering, mixing and mastering
- Frost (Kjetil-Vidar Haraldstad) – drums

=== Session ===
- Anja Garbarek – vocals on "Angstridden", "Mental Mercury" and "Black Lava"
- Erik Ljunggren – programming, keyboards

=== Production ===
- Erik Ljunggren – recording and engineering
- Michael H. Fernando – recording and engineering
- "Critter" – mixing
- Espen Berg – mastering

== Charts ==
Chart (2002)	Peak position
Norwegian Albums Chart	4
