= Now, Diabolical =

2006 studio album by Satyricon

Studio album by Satyricon
- Released: 17 April 2006
- Recorded: Puk Studio in Norway, Steel Productions, Urban & Warehouse Studio
- Genre: Black metal, heavy metal
- Length: 47:46
- Label: Roadrunner, Century Media
- Producer: Satyr

Satyricon chronology
Volcano (2002)	Now, Diabolical (2006)	My Skin Is Cold (2008)

Singles from Now, Diabolical
- 1. "K.I.N.G." Released: 3 April 2006; 2. "The Pentagram Burns"

Professional ratings
Review scores
Source	Rating
AllMusic	3.5/5 stars
About.com	3/5 stars
Blabbermouth.net	7.5/10
Chronicles of Chaos	2/10
Stylus Magazine	B−

Now, Diabolical is the sixth studio album by Norwegian black metal band Satyricon. It was released on 17 April 2006, through Roadrunner Records.

== Album style ==
AllMusic wrote of the album's style: "Satyricon still get a lot of flack every time a new album is released that doesn't conform to the outdated, rustic-necro-kvlt brand of Norwegian black metal they played in the early '90s (alongside Darkthrone, Ulver, Enslaved, etc.) Their sixth full album, Now, Diabolical is no exception, and it hardly out-shocks its similarly unconventional predecessor, 2002's Volcano; [it] just brings the band's present mentality of addition by subtraction to its next logical step", describing, "[...] cuts like 'A New Enemy', 'That Darkness Shall Be Eternal' and the title track find the core duo of Satyr and Frost seeking simplicity above all else; consistently shunning complicated arrangements and overbearing displays of musicianship to exercise an almost industrial sense of discipline whilst executing their hypnotic riffs, sinister melodies and static tempos."

Blabbermouth.net opined, "Songs like the title track and 'K.I.N.G.' are all about the aforementioned groove. The driving rhythms and Satyr's vocal patterns are downright catchy. This is not about virtuosity or esoteric displays to prove an underground credibility. It is about hard driving tempos and head banging with a snarl on your face."

== Release ==
On the vinyl version, as well as on the Scarecrow Records limited edition CD of the album, there is a bonus track, "Storm (Of the Destroyer)". Two singles were released from the album: "K.I.N.G." and "The Pentagram Burns"; both with videoclips.

== Track listing ==
No.	Title	Length
1.	"Now, Diabolical"	5:30
2.	"K.I.N.G."	3:36
3.	"The Pentagram Burns"	5:38
4.	"A New Enemy"	5:47
5.	"The Rite of Our Cross"	5:45
6.	"That Darkness Shall Be Eternal"	4:46
7.	"Delirium"	5:38
8.	"To the Mountains"	8:09

Bonus track
No.	Title	Length
9.	"Storm (Of the Destroyer)"	2:50

== Personnel ==
=== Satyricon ===
- Satyr – vocals, guitars, keyboards, horn arrangements
- Frost – drums

=== Session ===
- Lars K. Norberg – bass
- John Woz (John Wozniak) – additional vocals on "A New Enemy"
- Øivind Westby – horn arrangements

=== Production ===
- Satyr – production, special effects, art direction
- Erik Ljunggren – engineering, special effects
- Pytten – engineering
- Espen Berg – mastering
- Mike Fraser – mixing
- Per Heimly – photography
- Eric Mosher – engineering assistance
- Chris Samson – engineering
- Mike Cashin – engineering
- Ane Haugli – make-up on sleeve photos
- Martin Kvamme, Superlow – album artwork design

== Charts ==
Chart (2006)	Peak position
Finnish Albums Chart	28
Norwegian Albums Chart	2
Swedish Albums Chart	47
