= Nemesis Divina =

Studio album by Satyricon
- Released: April 22, 1996
- Recorded: January–February 1996
- Studios: Waterfall Studios, Oslo, Norway
- Genre: Black metal
- Length: 42:45
- Label: Moonfog
- Producer: Satyr

Satyricon chronology
The Shadowthrone (1994)	Nemesis Divina (1996)	Megiddo (1997)

Nemesis Divina (Latin for 'divine nemesis') is the third studio album by Norwegian black metal band Satyricon. It was released on 22 April 1996, through Moonfog Productions.

A fully remastered edition was released in May 2016 to mark the 20th anniversary of the album.

== Music ==
The band have described the album as "darker" and "more aggressive" than their previous work. Metal Hammer stated that the album "captures the band at their most apocalyptic, marching toward biblical Armageddon with a definite sense of swagger."

== Artwork ==
The album cover artwork for Nemesis Divina, designed by Halvor Bodin and Stein Løken, has been considered fairly revolutionary by the standards of black metal at the time. The band commented, "The standard, back then, was dodgy amateur photos and miserable looking fonts". Decibel magazine commented that the cover "resembled more a piece out of Dave McKean's workshop than art Xeroxed at dad's office [...] Rich with color and symbolism, the high-end design broke seriously sacred ground".

== Critical reception ==
Professional ratings
Review scores
Source	Rating
AllMusic	4/5 stars
Chronicles of Chaos	5/10
Collector's Guide to Heavy Metal	7/10
Distorted Sound	9/10
Rock Hard	9.0/10

Nemesis Divina is generally considered a classic of the black metal genre. AllMusic wrote, "this sweeping epic work is quintessential black metal". Terrorizer wrote that on Nemesis Divina, "[Satyricon] experienced a near-magical improvement. Songs like leadoff monster 'The Dawn of a New Age', centerpiece 'Mother North' and the title track were stronger than any song in Satyricon's past. Satyr's ever-impressive riff-making/songwriting skills displayed a maturity not found outside, say, fellow sophisticates Emperor".

A music video was released for "Mother North", which was generally uncommon within the black metal scene at the time. The video opens with "Montagues and Capulets". The video briefly appeared in the mainstream film Spun.

In 2009, IGN included Nemesis Divina in their "10 Great Black Metal Albums" list. Decibel magazine inducted Nemesis Divina into the publication's "hall of fame", and later ranked it at number six on its list of the Top 100 Black Metal Albums of All Time.

== Track listing ==
All songs written by Satyr, except "Du som hater Gud", written by Satyr & Fenriz

The Conquering
No.	Title	Length
1.	"The Dawn of a New Age"	7:28
2.	"Forhekset" ("Bewitched")	4:32
3.	"Mother North"	6:26
4.	"Du som hater Gud" ("You Who Hate God")	4:21
5.	"Immortality Passion"	8:23
6.	"Nemesis Divina"	6:55
7.	"Transcendental Requiem of Slaves"	4:44
Total length:		42:45

== Personnel ==
Satyricon

- Satyr (Sigurd Wongraven) – vocals, lead guitar, bass guitar, sleeve design and logo
- Kveldulv (Ted Skjellum; also known as Nocturno Culto) – rhythm guitar
- Frost (Kjetil-Vidar Haraldstad) – drums, album logo

Session musicians

- Gerlioz (Geir Bratland) – synthesizer, grand piano
- Nebelhexë (Andrea Haugen) – spoken part on "The Dawn of a New Age"

Production

- Union of Lost Souls – sleeve design
- Per Heimly Productions – sleeve photography
- Anne Cecilie – makeup for sleeve photos
- Union of Lost Souls – album logo

== Charts ==
Chart (2016)	Peak position
Austrian Albums (Ö3 Austria)	57
Belgian Albums (Ultratop Flanders)	107
German Albums (Offizielle Top 100)	71
