= Revelations of the Black Flame =

Studio album by 1349
- Released: 25 May 2009
- Recorded: December 2008 – January 2009
- Studio: Studio Studio Nyhagen (Bøverbru, Norway)
- Genre: Black metal, avant-garde metal
- Length: 44:53
- Label: Candlelight
- Producer: Ravn

1349 chronology
Hellfire (2005)	Revelations of the Black Flame (2009)	Demonoir (2010)

Professional ratings
Review scores
Source	Rating
AllMusic	4/5 stars
About.com	2.5/5 stars
Chronicles of Chaos	6/10
Revolver	2.5/5 stars
Rock Sound	5/10 stars
Sputnikmusic	1.5/5 stars
Metal Temple	4/10 stars

Revelations of the Black Flame is the fourth studio album by Norwegian black metal band 1349.

The studio sessions took place during December 2008 in a woodland studio in Bøverbru (a village in the Toten region of Norway). 1349 mixed the album in January 2009. The album was co-mixed by Tom Gabriel Fischer. This marked the first and as yet, only experimental album by the band, as they almost completely abandoned their earlier old school black metal style, instead making use of irregular song structures and more progressive ideas. The album also contains a variety of dark ambient compositions spread throughout. After this release, the band would return to their previous, more straight-forward style.

== Track listing ==
The limited-edition version of the album features a bonus disc containing a live performance in Stockholm recorded in 2005.

1. "Invocation" - 6:13
2. "Serpentine Sibilance" - 4:35
3. "Horns" - 3:04
4. "Maggot Fetus... Teeth Like Thorns" - 3:46
5. "Misanthropy" - 3:33
6. "Uncreation" - 6:59
7. "Set the Controls for the Heart of the Sun" (Pink Floyd cover) - 6:13
8. "Solitude" - 3:38
9. "At the Gate..." - 6:52

=== Works of Fire, Forces of Hell – Live Stockholm 2005 ===
1. "Hellfire" - 5:47
2. "Chasing Dragons" - 6:33
3. "Satanic Propaganda" - 3:14
4. "I Am Abomination" - 4:13
5. "Manifest" - 5:06
6. "Slaves to Slaughter" - 8:55

== Personnel ==
- Ravn – production
- Ronni Le Tekrø – production
- Tom Gabriel Fischer – mixing
- Kjartan Hesthagen – engineering
