= Entombed A.D. =

Swedish death metal band

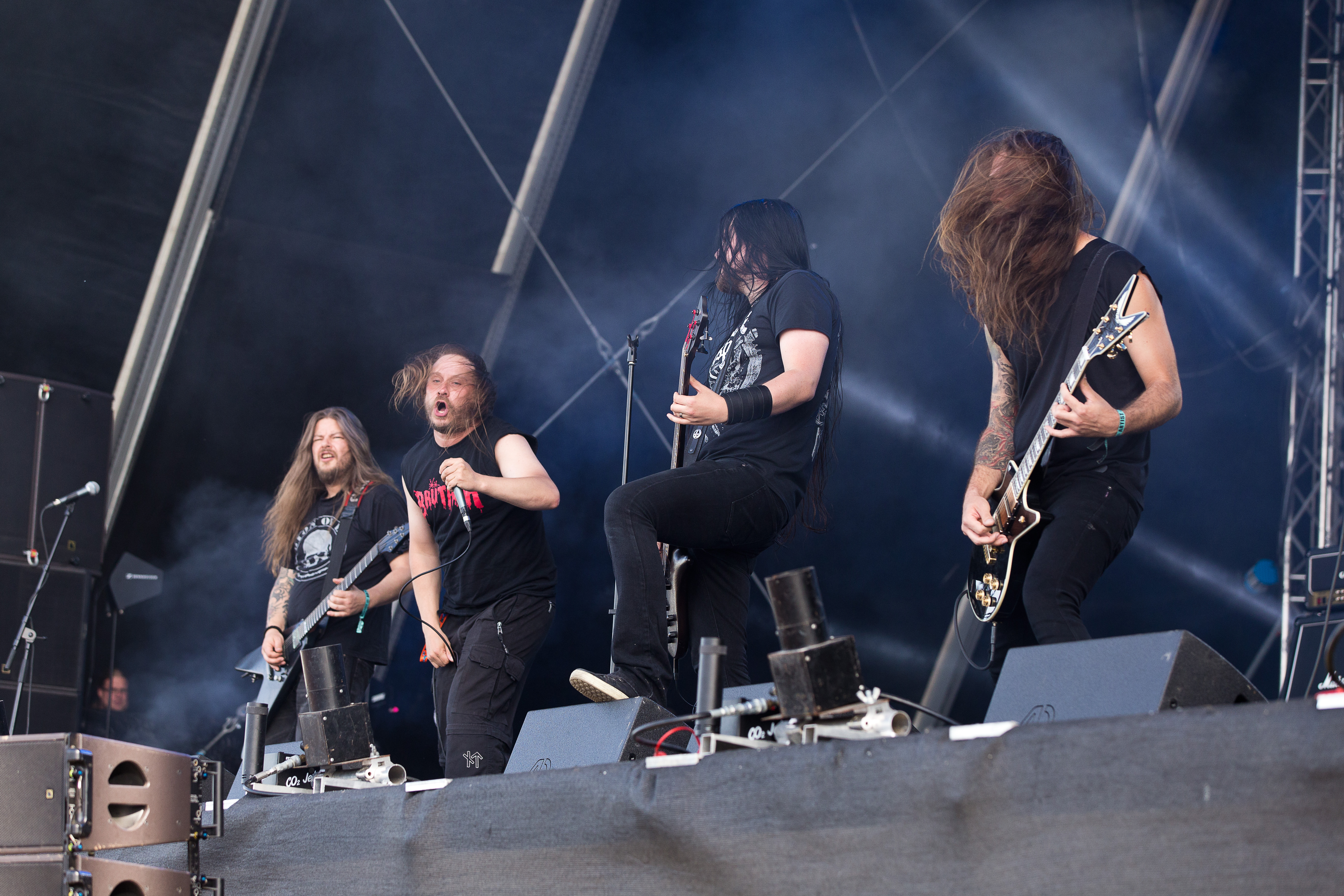
- Entombed A.D. performing at the Rockharz Open Air 2016 in Germany

Background information
- Origin: Stockholm, Sweden
- Genres: Death metal, death 'n' roll
- Years active: 2014–2021
- Labels: Century Media
- Spinoff of: Entombed
- Past members: Nico Elgstrand; Guilherme Miranda; Olle Dahlstedt; Victor Brandt; Lars-Göran Petrov

Entombed A.D. was a Swedish death metal band formed in 2014, composed of former members of Entombed after their breakup. They released their debut album, Back to the Front, the same year. The band's final lineup consisted of Olle Dahlstedt (drums), Nico Elgstrand (guitar), and Guilherme Miranda (guitar). They broke up after the death of singer Lars-Göran Petrov.

== History ==
Petrov, Dahlstedt, Elstrand and Brandt had all been members of pioneering Swedish death metal Entombed. When Petrov (who was also a co-founder of the band) had a dispute with other co-founder and guitarist Alex Helid. This resulted in Helid gaining the right to the Entombed, while Petrov continued on as Entombed A.D. with members of the final line-up.

== Band members ==
- Lars-Göran Petrov – vocals (2014–2021; died 2021)
- Olle Dahlstedt – drums (2014–2021)
- Nico Elgstrand – guitar, backing vocals (2014–2021)
- Victor Brandt – bass (2014–2018)
- Guilherme Miranda – guitar, backing vocals (2015–2021)

Live musicians

- Johan Jansson – guitar (2014–2015)
- Tobias Cristiansson – bass (2018–2019)
- Cauê De Marinis – bass (2019–2021)
Entombed A.D. live at With Full Force 2018

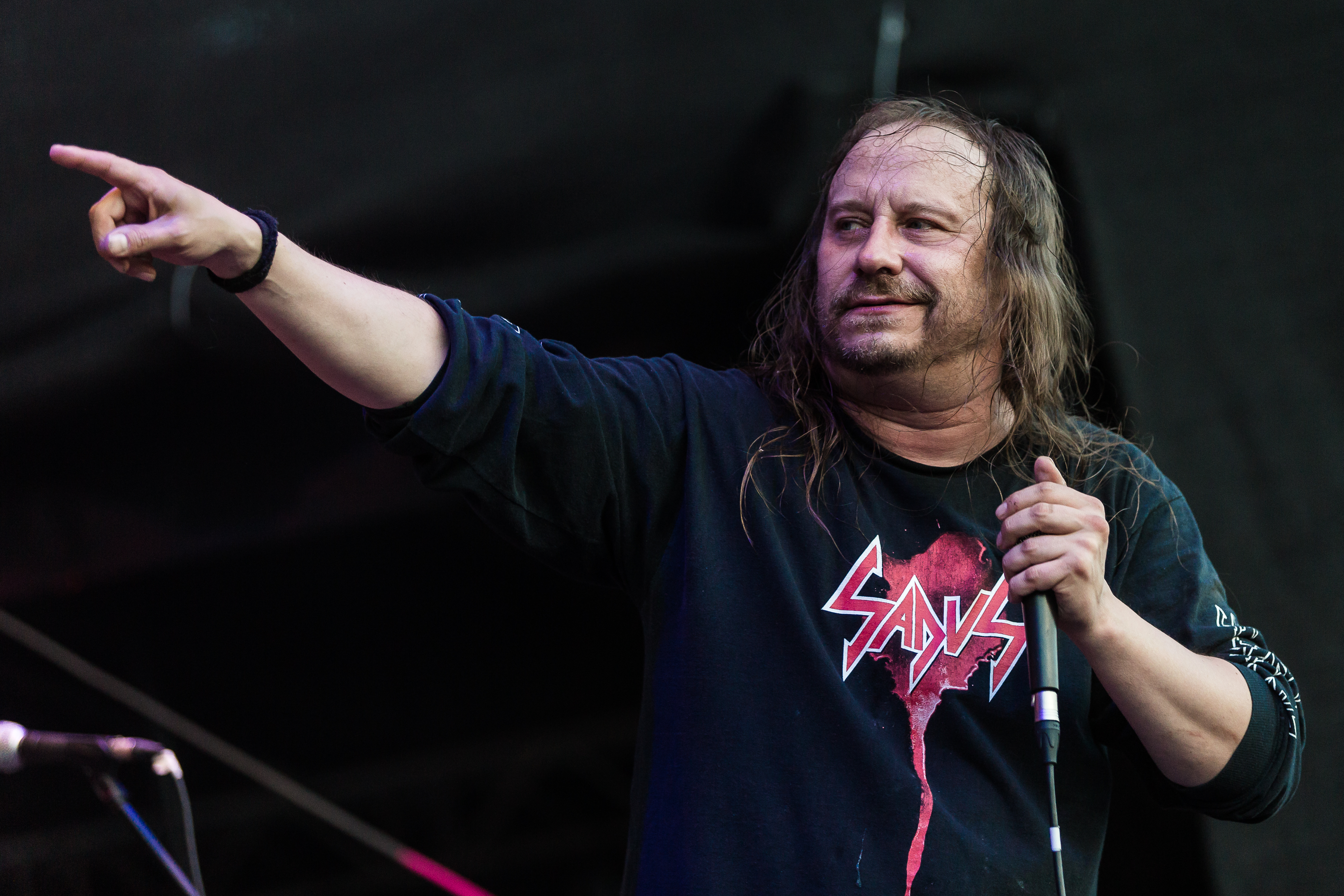
Lars-Göran Petrov

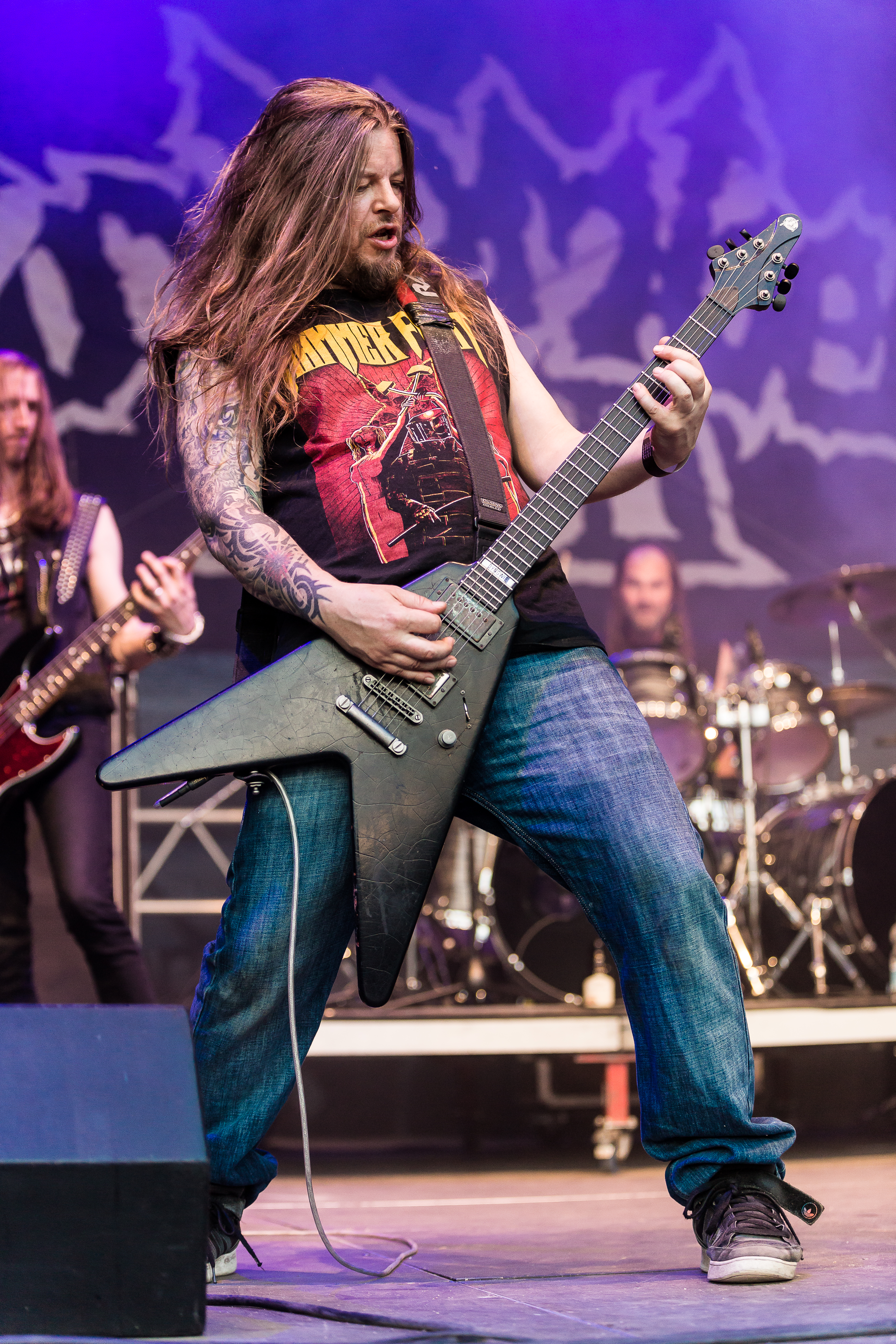
Nico Elgstrand

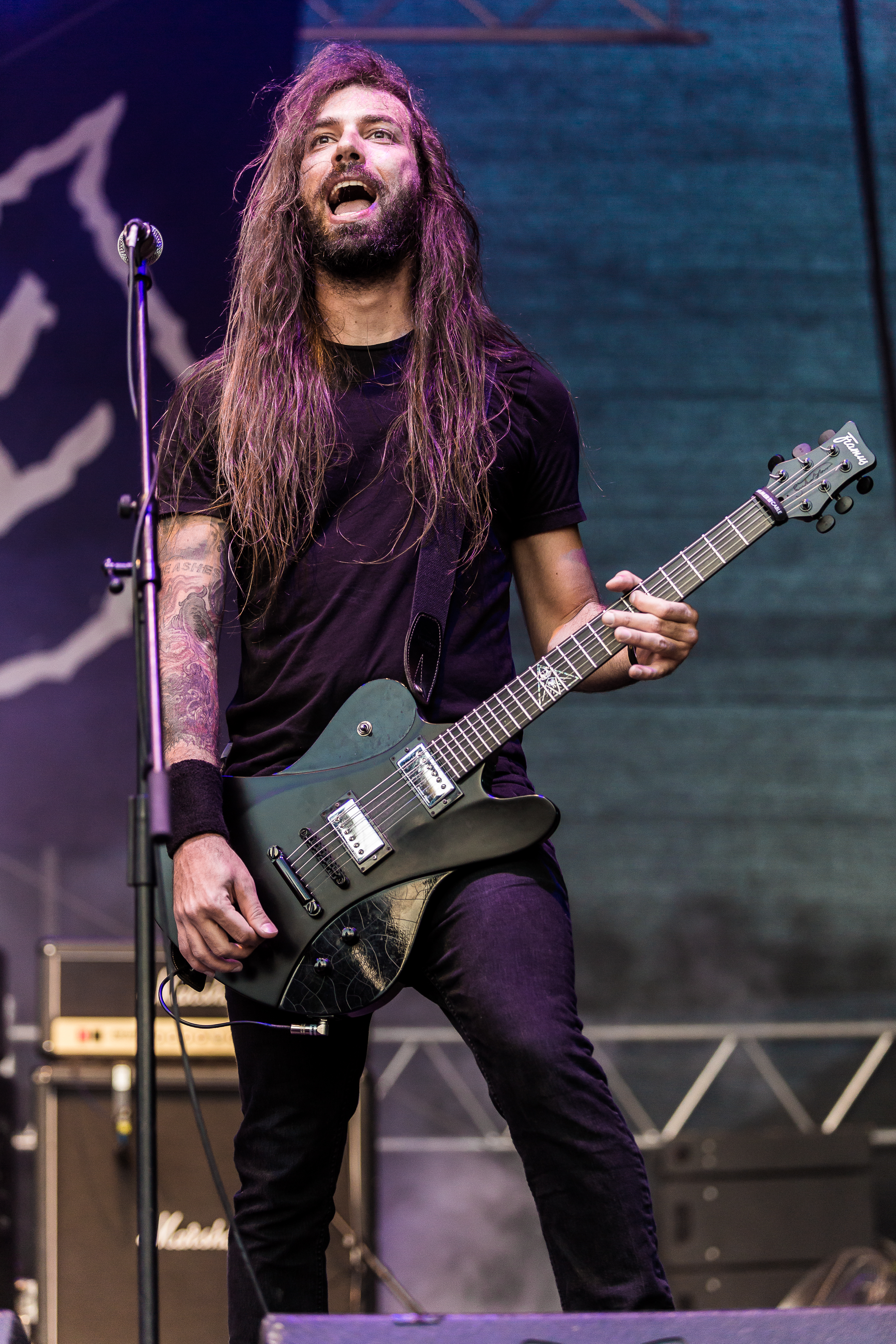
Guilherme Miranda

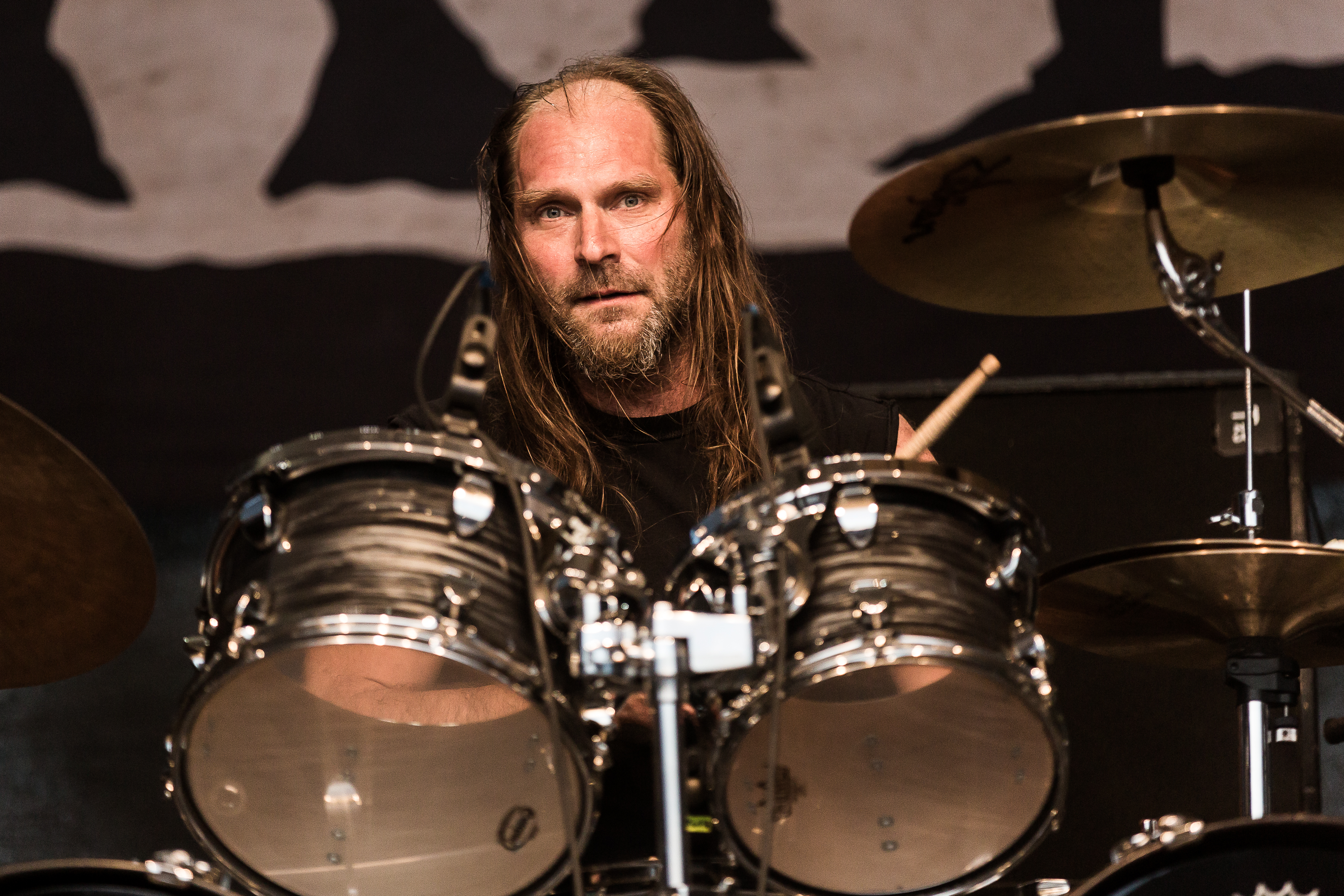
Olle Dahlstedt

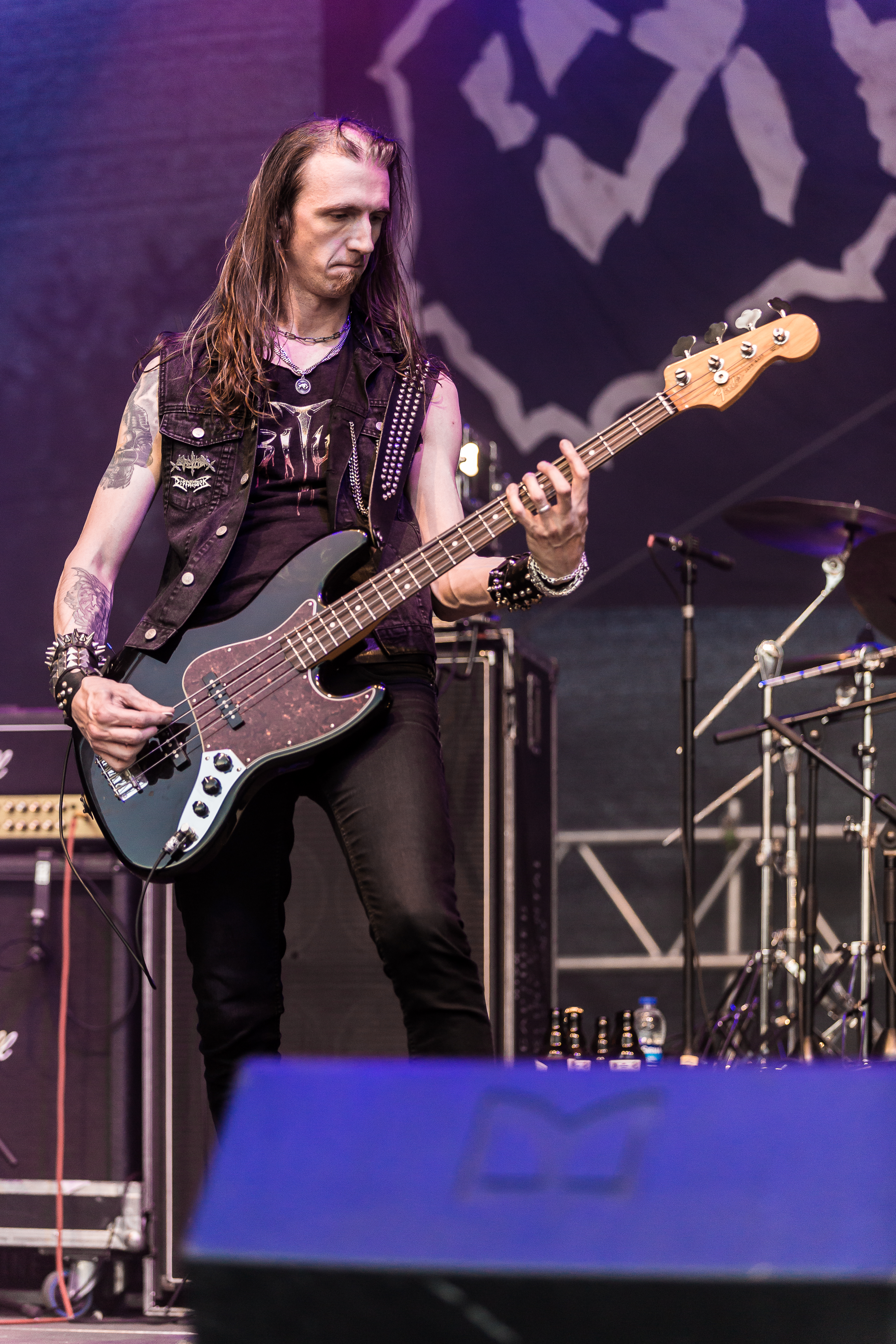
Tobias Christianson

== Discography ==
=== Studio albums ===
Title	Album details	Peak chart positions				
Title	Album details	FIN	GER	BEL (WA)	BEL (FL)	US Heat.
Back to the Front	Released: 5 August 2014; Label: Century Media Records; Formats: CD, LP, digital download	5	53	146	139	40
Dead Dawn	Released: 26 February 2016; Label: Century Media Records; Formats: CD, LP, digital download	29	78	129	101	—
Bowels of Earth	Released: 30 August 2019; Label: Century Media Records; Formats: CD, LP, digital download	—	64	—	—	—
"—" denotes a recording that did not chart or was not released in that territory.

=== Music videos ===
Year	Title	Directed	Album
2014	"Pandemic Rage"	Valentin Mellström, Stian Roenning	Back to the Front
2014	"Kill to Live"	Oliver Barth	Back to the Front
2016	"The Winner Has Lost"	Marcus Wild	Dead Dawn
2016	"Dead Dawn"	Mattias Björkbacka	Dead Dawn
2019	"Torment Remains"	Claudio Marino	Bowels of Earth
2019	"Elimination"	Costin Chioreanu	Bowels of Earth
