= Massive Cauldron of Chaos =

Studio album by 1349
- Released: 29 September 2014
- Recorded: October – November 2013 at Studio Nyhagen
- Genre: Black metal
- Length: 44:16
- Label: Season of Mist
- Producer: Jarrett Prichard, 1349

1349 chronology
Demonoir (2010)	Massive Cauldron of Chaos (2014)	The Infernal Pathway (2019)

Singles from Massive Cauldron of Chaos
- 1. "Slaves" Released: 4 April 2014

Massive Cauldron of Chaos is the sixth studio album by Norwegian black metal band 1349. It was released on 29 September 2014 through Season of Mist. The album marks a break in the usual trend for the band to release album artwork in a jet black colour, instead using white.

== Track listing ==
All music is composed by Archaon, except "Golem" by Frost and "The Heretic" by Mike Torrao.

No.	Title	Lyrics	Length
1.	"Cauldron"	Destroyer	4:24
2.	"Slaves"	Destroyer	4:53
3.	"Exorcism"	Archaon	5:36
4.	"Postmortem"	Destroyer	4:35
5.	"Mengele's"	Destroyer	5:59
6.	"Golem"	Frost, Seidemann	1:39
7.	"Chained"	Destroyer	4:52
8.	"Untitled" (instrumental, digipak bonus track)		1:07
9.	"Godslayer"	Frost	5:56
10.	"The Heretic" (Possessed cover, digipak bonus track)	Jeff Becerra	2:26
Total length:			44:16

== Reception ==
Professional ratings
Review scores
Source	Rating
About.com	4/5 stars
Sputnikmusic	4/5 stars

The album has mostly received a positive reception.

== Credits ==
1349

- Ravn – vocals
- Seidemann – bass
- Archaon – guitars
- Frost – drums

Production

- Jarrett Prichard – production, mixing, mastering
- Ravn – mixing
- Johannes Hoie – illustration
- Marcelo Vasco – layout
