= Kjetil-Vidar Haraldstad =

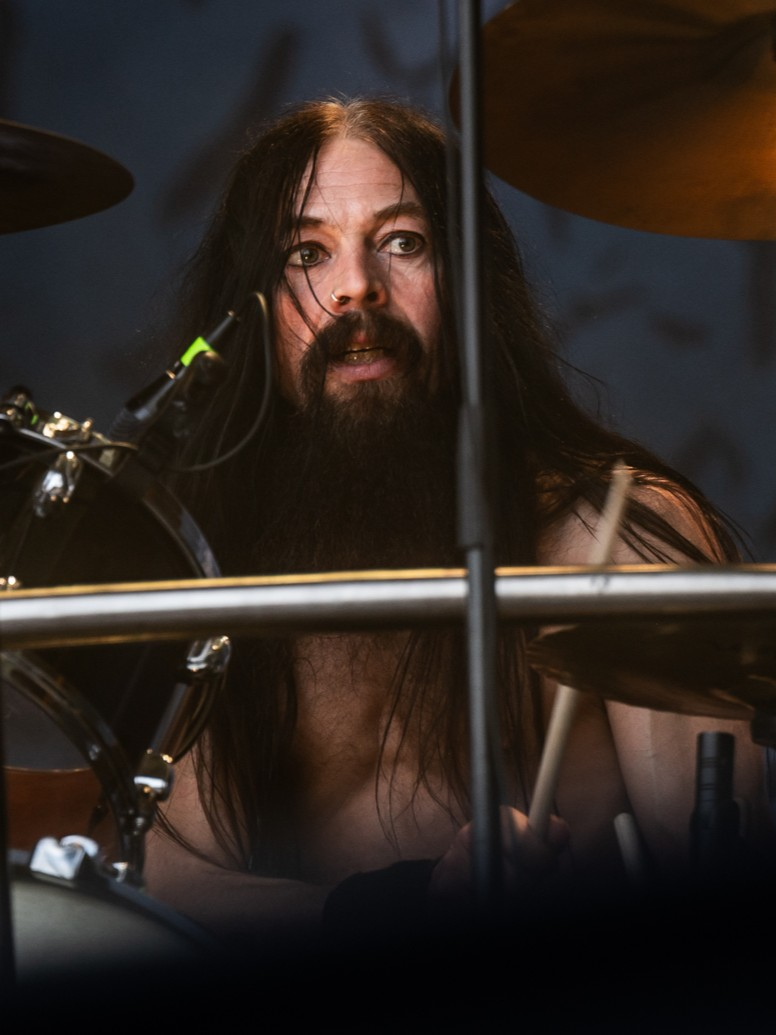
- Frost in 2024

Background information
- Born: Kjetil-Vidar Haraldstad; 26 June 1973 (age 53); Øyer Municipality, Oppland, Norway
- Genres: Black metal
- Occupation: Musician
- Instruments: Drums; percussion

Kjetil-Vidar Haraldstad (stage name Frost; born 28 June 1973) is a Norwegian drummer in the black metal bands Satyricon and 1349. He was born in Øyer Municipality in Oppland county.

Frost has previously performed with Gorgoroth, Zyklon-B, Gehenna and Keep of Kalessin. He originally joined Satyricon temporarily to record the demo The Forest is My Throne, later joining the band full-time. He has a degree in Engineering, having taken a course in Computer Science at the University of Oslo.

He is regarded as one of the fastest and most proficient drummers in the black metal and extreme metal genres. Frost employs various drumming styles when performing with different bands; in 1349 and early Satyricon he extensively uses blast beats, with his most recent work in Satyricon being more thought-out and mid-tempo. On 1349's 2009 studio album Revelations of the Black Flame he played at a slower speed as it was a more experimental album, but for every other release by the band he has consistently played at higher speeds. On all Satyricon albums his role is credited simply as "battery".

Frost was denied entry to North America by the US Department of Homeland Security upon failing to note his having been sentenced to 5 months in jail for assault (during a bar fight in the early '90s) when applying for his work visa.

On 1349 tours before 2008, he was replaced by Tony Laureano. Joey Jordison and Trym Torson have performed with Satyricon on North American tour dates. He later was able to perform again in the United States.

He appeared in the documentary film Until The Light Takes Us as part of an art piece by Norwegian artist Bjarne Melgaard, featuring him firebreathing, cutting himself with a knife, and destroying the set.

Since 2018 Frost adheres to a mostly plant-based vegan diet. He says that he has shown appreciation for good food and believes it will be the future in terms of what humans consume on a daily basis. He predicts that "the world will be completely different on the subject of food — and even quality of food, actually." Frost also says that his diet helped him become more productive with Satyricon.

== Equipment ==
Frost uses Tama drums and pedals, Zildjian cymbals, and Vic Firth drumsticks.

Drums: Tama Starclassic Bubinga:

- 24"x18" bass drums (x2)
- 12"x9" rack tom
- 13"x10" rack tom
- 14"x11" rack tom
- 16"x13" floor tom
- 18"x16" floor tom
- 14"x5.5" snare
- Iron Cobra Power Glide Kick Pedals

Cymbals: Zildjian:

- 16" A Custom fast crash
- 16" K Custom fast crash
- 14" K light hi-hats
- 17" A Custom fast crash
- 20" FX Oriental china "trash"
- 9.5" Zil-Bel Large
- 11" FX Oriental "trash" splash
- 14" A Custom fast crash
- 10" A Custom splash
- 14" Special K/Z hi-hats
- 17" K Custom dark china
- 18" A Custom crash
- 21" A mega bell ride
- 20" FX Oriental crash of doom
- 16" FX Oriental china "trash"

== Discography ==
| Year | Title | Band |
|---|---|---|
| 1993 | Dark Medieval Times | Satyricon |
| 1994 | The Shadowthrone | Satyricon |
| 1995 | Blood Must be Shed | Zyklon-B |
| 1996 | Nemesis Divina | Satyricon |
| 1996 | Antichrist | Gorgoroth |
| 1998 | Destroyer (one song only) | Gorgoroth |
| 1999 | Rebel Extravaganza | Satyricon |
| 2000 | 1349 | 1349 |
| 2002 | Volcano | Satyricon |
| 2003 | Reclaim | Keep of Kalessin |
| 2003 | Liberation | 1349 |
| 2004 | Beyond the Apocalypse | 1349 |
| 2005 | Hellfire | 1349 |
| 2005 | WW | Gehenna |
| 2006 | Ad Majorem Sathanas Gloriam | Gorgoroth |
| 2006 | Now, Diabolical | Satyricon |
| 2008 | The Age of Nero | Satyricon |
| 2009 | Revelations Of the Black Flame | 1349 |
| 2010 | The Underworld Regime | Ov Hell |
| 2010 | Demonoir | 1349 |
| 2013 | Satyricon | Satyricon |
| 2014 | Massive Cauldron of Chaos | 1349 |
| 2017 | Deep Calleth Upon Deep | Satyricon |
| 2019 | The Infernal Pathway | 1349 |
| 2022 | Satyricon & Munch | Satyricon |
| 2024 | The Wolf & the King | 1349 |
