= Sigurd Wongraven =

Norwegian musician

Satyr
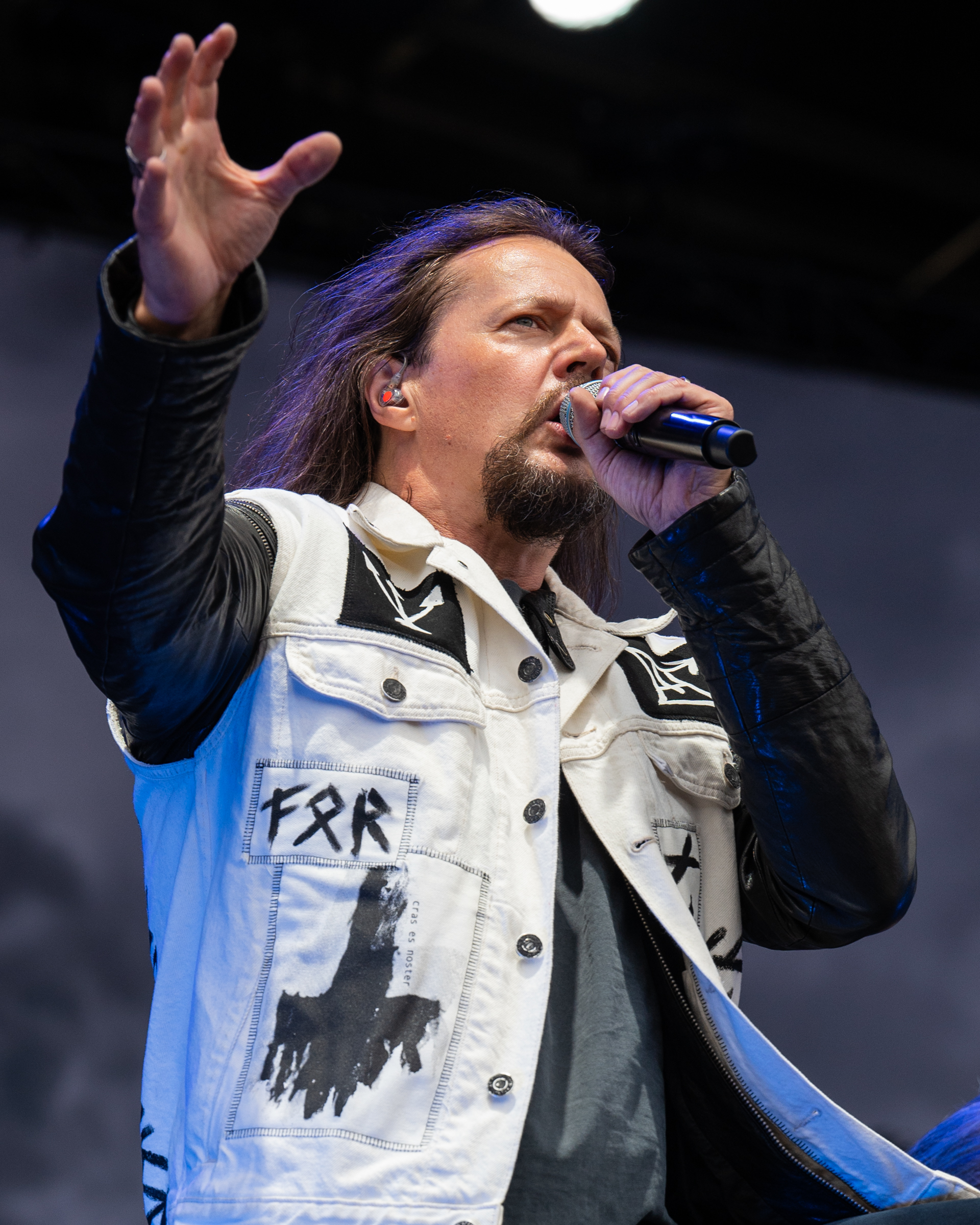
- Satyr live in 2024

Background information
- Also known as: Satyr
- Born: Sigurd Wongraven; 28 November 1975 (age 50); Oslo, Norway
- Genres: Black metal, dungeon synth, ambient
- Occupations: Musician, songwriter
- Instruments: Vocals, guitar, bass, keyboards
- Years active: 1991–present
- Member of: Satyricon
- Formerly of: Storm, Wongraven, Black Diamond Brigade

Sigurd Wongraven (born 28 November 1975), also known as Satyr, is a Norwegian musician who is the vocalist, guitarist, bassist and keyboardist for the black metal band Satyricon.

== Musical career ==
Wongraven was a founding member of Satyricon (although the band had been around for a short length of time as Eczema without him) and have so far released nine albums, two demos, and a live DVD. He has also contributed to other bands such as Darkthrone, Eibon, Storm, Thorns, Black Diamond Brigade and Wongraven. About black metal, he stated "It, black metal, doesn't necessarily have to be all satanic as long as it's dark."

In 2008 he began to endorse ESP Guitars.

== Wine making ==
In 2009 Wongraven started his own winemaking business, Wongraven Wines, in Piedmont in Italy. In 2014 the company began to work with Norwegian beverage conglomerate Vingruppen, and in 2019 he sold 90% of the company to Vingruppen, in a transaction valuing the company at NOK 57 million.

== Health ==
Wongraven was diagnosed with a brain tumor in October 2015, which he says does not need to be removed surgically, "as long as it does not grow bigger."

== See also ==
- List of celebrities who own wineries and vineyards
