= List of musicians who play left-handed =

This is a list of notable left-handed musicians who play their instruments naturally. This does not include left-handed people who play (or played) right-handed, such as Joe Perry, Mark Knopfler, and Gary Moore.

== Guitarists and bassists ==
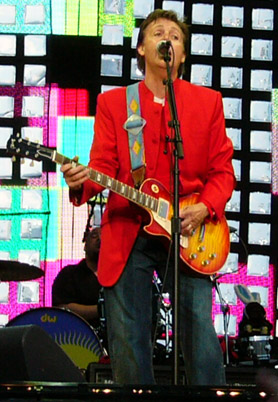
Paul McCartney playing a true left-handed guitar (a Gibson Les Paul).

Left-handed people play guitar or electric bass in one of the following ways: (1) play the instrument truly right-handed, (2) play the instrument truly left-handed, (3) altering a right-handed instrument to play left-handed, or (4) turning a right-handed instrument upside down to pick with the left hand, but not altering the strings – leaving them reversed from the normal order. (The fingering is the same for methods 2 and 3.) Any style of picking with the left hand (flatpicking or fingerstyle guitar) is considered playing left-handed.

=== Guitarists ===
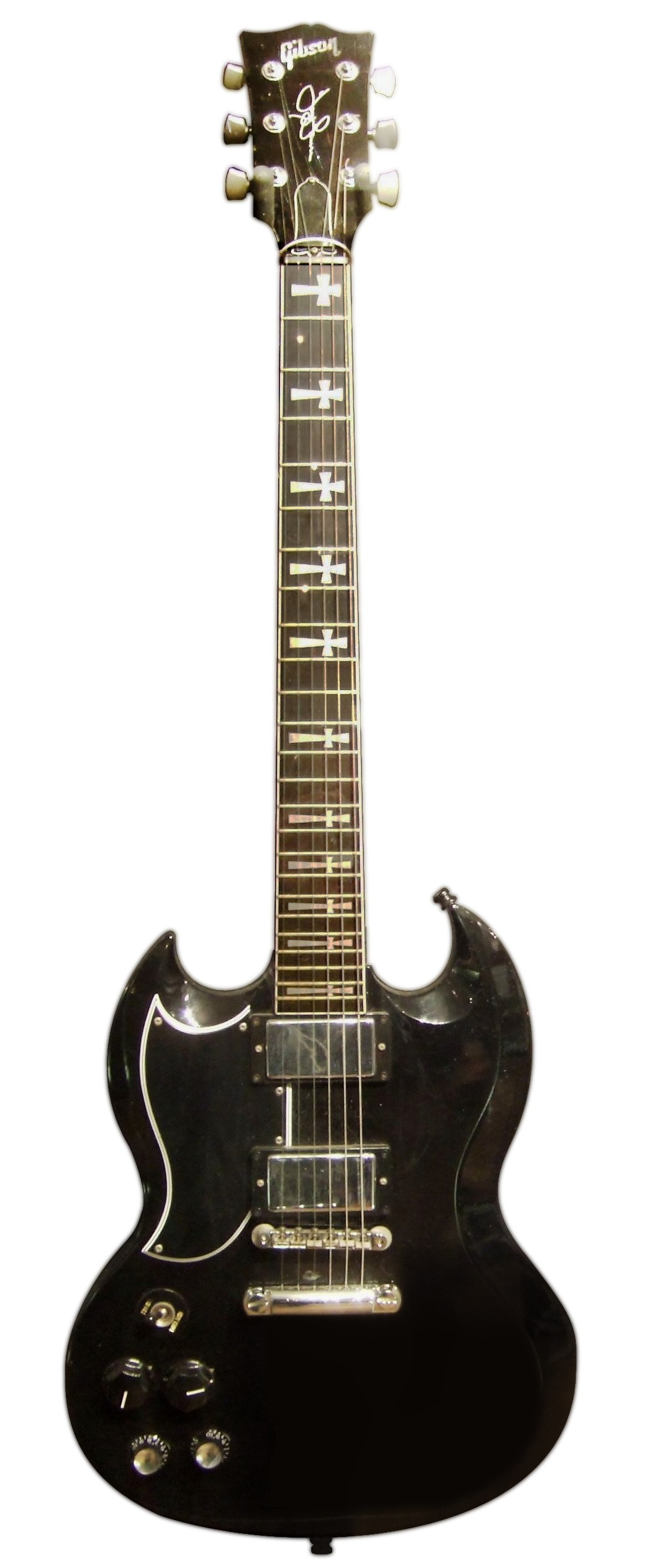
Tony Iommi's guitar, a custom-made Gibson SG

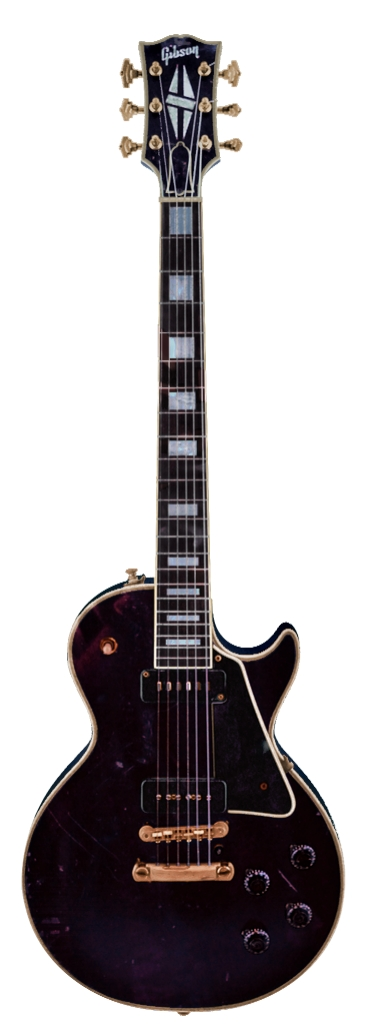
Jimi Hendrix's Les Paul Custom – a right-handed guitar with the strings reversed for playing left-handed

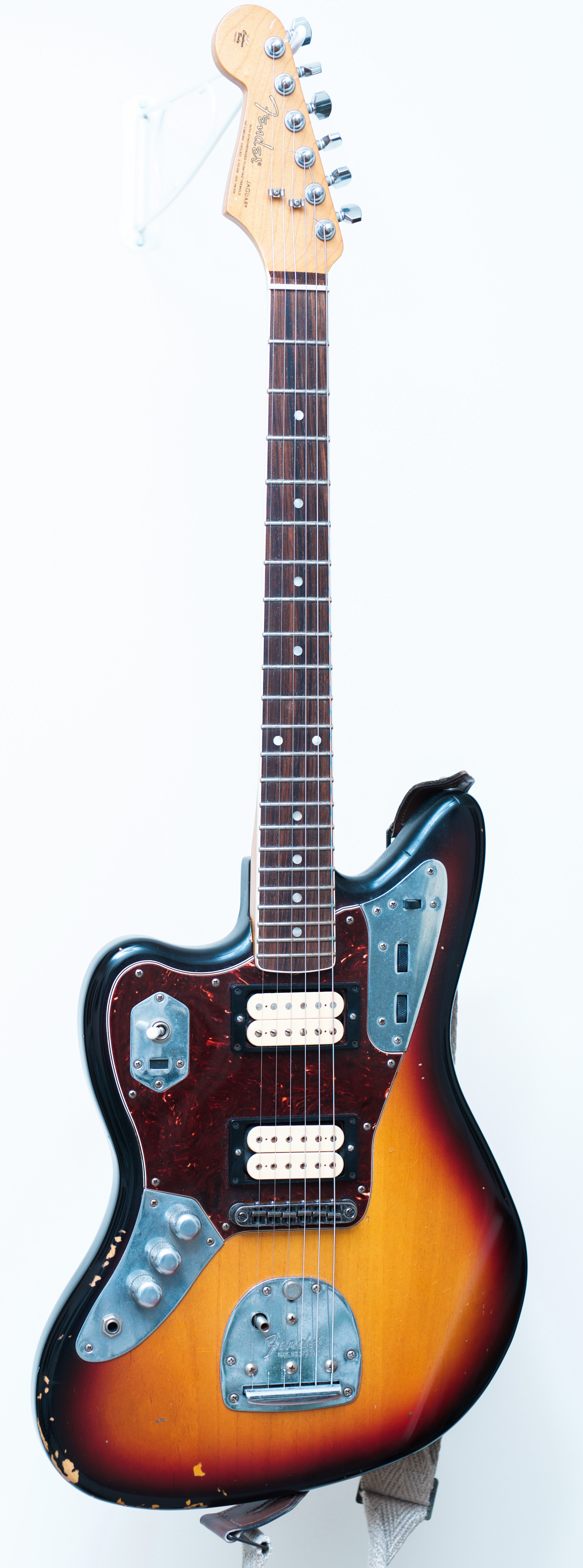
Fender Kurt Cobain Signature Road Worn Jaguar

==== Left-handed with normal stringing ====
Guitarists in this category pick with their left hand and have the strings in the conventional order for a left-handed player (i.e. the low string on the top side of the neck). They either have true left-handed guitars or have right-handed guitars altered so the strings are correct for a left-handed player. Some guitarists in this category (e.g. Paul McCartney) play both genuine left-handed instruments and right-handed instruments altered for left-handed playing.

Changing the strings on a right-handed guitar involves several things. The nut of the guitar has to be changed to accommodate the string widths. The bridge needs to be changed to make the lower-note (thicker) strings longer than the higher-note (thinner) strings for correct intonation. On almost all acoustic guitars the bracing is non-symmetrical. On electric guitars altered this way, the controls will be backwards.

===== Notable players =====
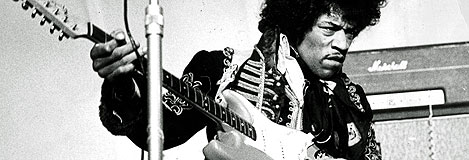
Hendrix on stage in Stockholm, Sweden, in 1967

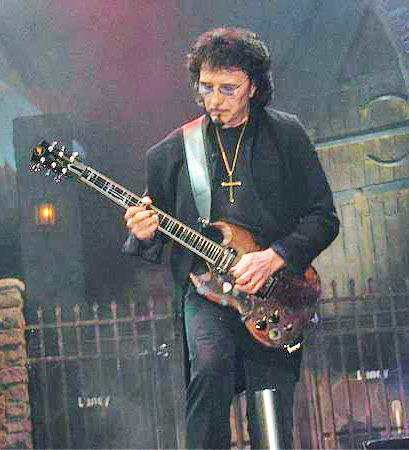
Tony Iommi playing a true left-handed guitar (a Jaydee Custom S.G.)

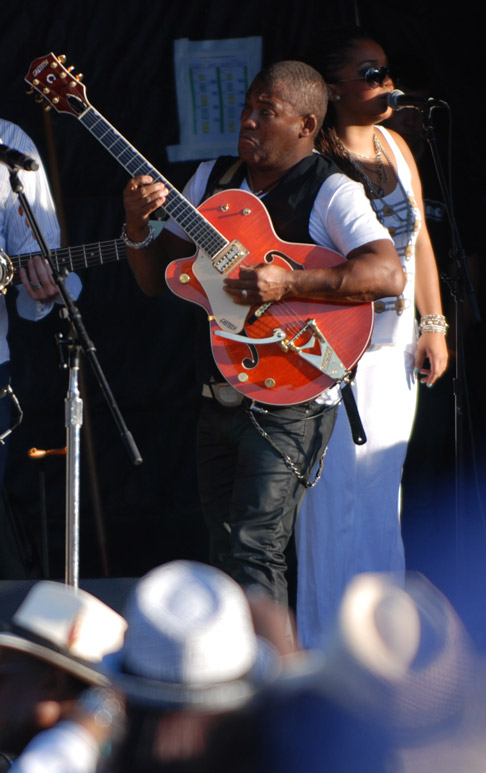
Jonathan Butler at the Newport Beach Jazz Festival, 2011.

- Adrian Borland (The Sound)
- Al McKay (Earth, Wind & Fire)
- Ali Campbell (ex-UB40)
- Andrew "Whitey" White (Kaiser Chiefs)
- Atahualpa Yupanqui
- Austin Carlile (ex-Attack Attack!, Of Mice & Men)
- Barbara Lynn
- Barry Winslow (The Royal Guardsmen)
- Beeb Birtles (Little River Band)
- Ben Howard
- Billy Ray Cyrus
- Blake Schwarzenbach (Jawbreaker)
- Bryan Harvey (House of Freaks)
- Cameron Liddell (Asking Alexandria)
- Calogero (plays guitar and bass left-handed)
- Carlos Vives
- Cesar Rosas (Los Lobos)
- Cheyenne Kimball
- Christian Savill (Slowdive)
- Courtney Barnett
- Craig Scanlon (The Fall)
- Dave Kilminster (former lefty; originally played left-handed until injury, now exclusively plays right-handed)
- Dave King (Flogging Molly)
- Davey von Bohlen (The Promise Ring, Cap'n Jazz)
- David Cook
- David Reilly (God Lives Underwater)
- Dickey Lee
- Eef Barzelay (Clem Snide)
- Elliot Easton (The Cars)
- Emma Bale
- Eric Bogle
- Ernie C (Body Count)
- Frank Agnello (The Fab Faux)
- Fyfe Dangerfield (Guillemots)
- Georgina "Georgi" Kay
- Greg Sage (right-handed, decided to play left-handed with the Wipers)
- Gregor Mackintosh (Paradise Lost)
- Gustavo Cordera (Bersuit Vergarabat)
- Hayley Kiyoko
- Huw Gower (The Records)
- Ian Fowles (The Aquabats, Death By Stereo)
- Iggy Pop
- Imai Hisashi (Buck-Tick)
- Jay Diggins
- Jeffrey Steele (formerly of Boy Howdy)
- Jill Barber
- Jimi Hendrix (wrote right-handed)
- Jo Callis (The Rezillos/The Human League)
- Joanna Wang
- John Flansburgh (They Might Be Giants)
- Jonathan Butler
- Josey Scott (Saliva)
- Joyce Jonathan (French pop singer)
- Justin Bieber
- Klaus Eichstadt (Ugly Kid Joe)
- Kurt Cobain (Nirvana) (wrote and played drums right-handed)
- Lars Johansson (Candlemass)
- William H. "Lefty" Bates
- Lukas Rossi (can play the guitar with either hand)
- Luke Morley (Thunder / The Union)
- Mac Powell (Third Day)
- Maria Taylor (Azure Ray, Little Red Rocket, Now It's Overhead, solo)
- Mark "Kazzer" Kasprzyk (Redlight King, solo)
- Martin Bramah (The Fall/Blue Orchids)
- Mdou Moctar
- Michael Zakarin (The Bravery)
- Nicke Andersson (The Hellacopters, Imperial State Electric)
- Ollie Halsall
- Omar Rodríguez-López (At the Drive-In/The Mars Volta)
- Pasi Koskinen (St. Mucus, Ajattara, To Separate the Flesh from the Bones)
- Paul Gray (Slipknot) started out playing right-handed, then changed to left-handed as it was more comfortable being left-handed.
- Paul McCartney (The Beatles) (first struggled playing right-handed, but then saw a picture of Slim Whitman playing left-handed and realized that he could reverse the guitar, reverse the strings, and pick with the left hand; playing drums right-handed) (Babiuk 2001:14)
- Paul Mullen (The Automatic/Young Legionnaire/Yourcodenameis:milo)
- Paula Fernandes
- Paulo Furtado (Wraygunn/The Legendary Tigerman)
- Pernilla Andersson
- Perry Bamonte (The Cure)
- Ragnar Þórhallsson (Of Monsters and Men)
- Rami Yosifov (Teapacks)
- Richie Stotts (Plasmatics)
- Robin Campbell (UB40)
- Ronnie Radke (Falling in Reverse, ex-Escape the Fate)
- Santiago Feliú
- Shae Dupuy
- Slim Whitman (right-handed but played left-handed due to loss of two fingers on his left hand)
- Stella Parton
- Sylvia Tyson
- Ted Gärdestad
- Ted Sablay (The Killers)
- Templeton Thompson (female country singer-songwriter)
- Tim Armstrong (Rancid)
- Tom Holliston (Nomeansno, The Hanson Brothers, solo)
- Tony Iommi (Black Sabbath)
- Toronzo Cannon
- Travis Denning
- Will Glover (The Pyramids)
- Verónica Romero
- Vicentico
- Zacky Vengeance (Avenged Sevenfold) (started to play right-handed but then shortly moved to left-handed playing)

==== Left-handed with strings backwards ====
These are left-handed players who play naturally, but with the strings organized to emulate an unaltered right-handed guitar, thus the strings are backwards for a left-handed player. The guitar is held left-handed with the high string on the top side of the neck (e.g. Bob Geldof). Some players in this category (e.g. Dick Dale and Albert King) had left-handed guitars with the strings as on a right-handed guitar, since they had learned to play that way.

===== Notable players =====
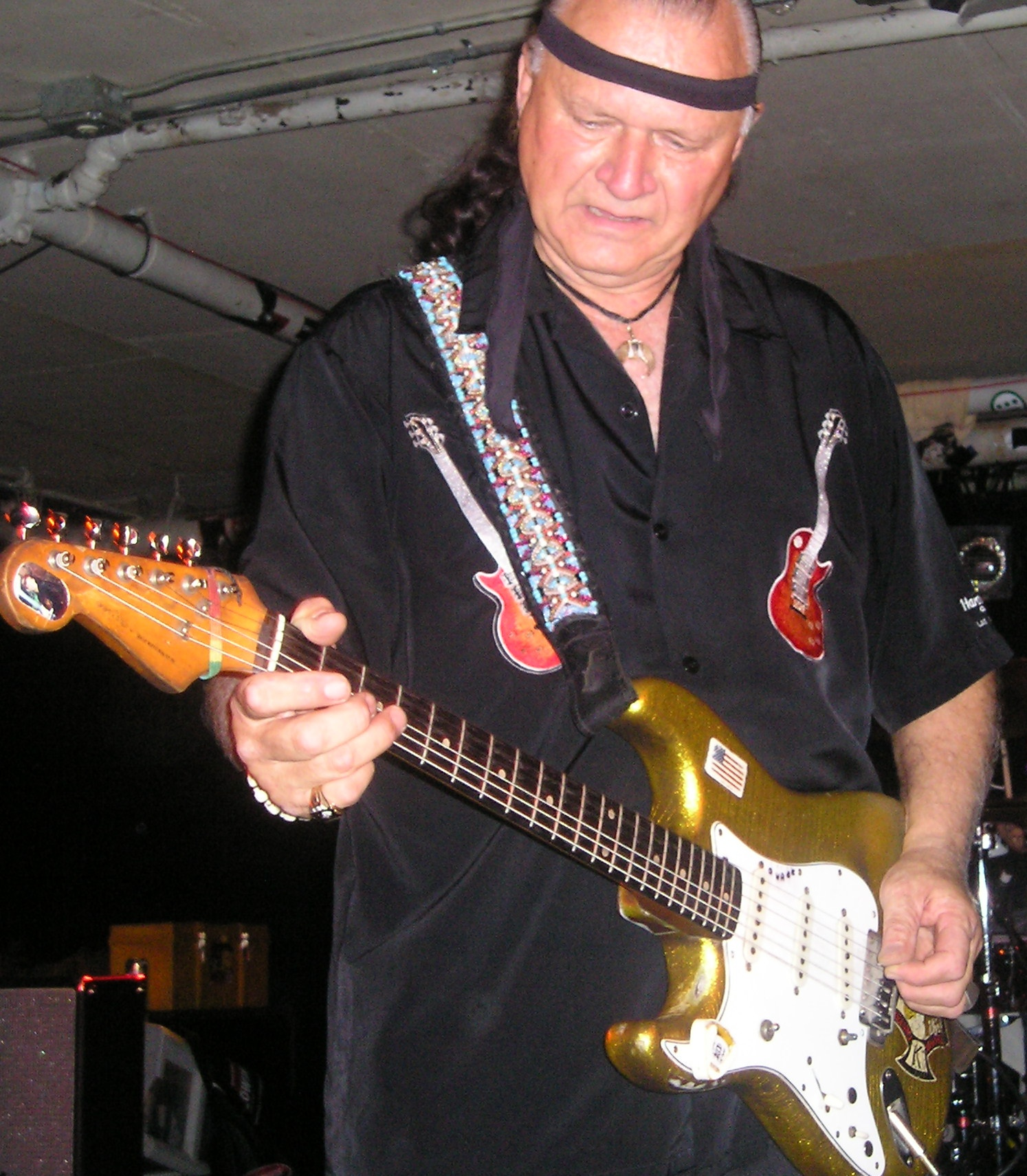
Dick Dale playing a customized left-handed guitar with the strings backwards.

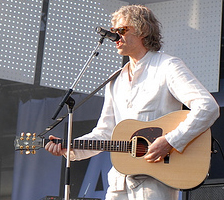
Bob Geldof playing a right-handed guitar upside down (a Gibson).

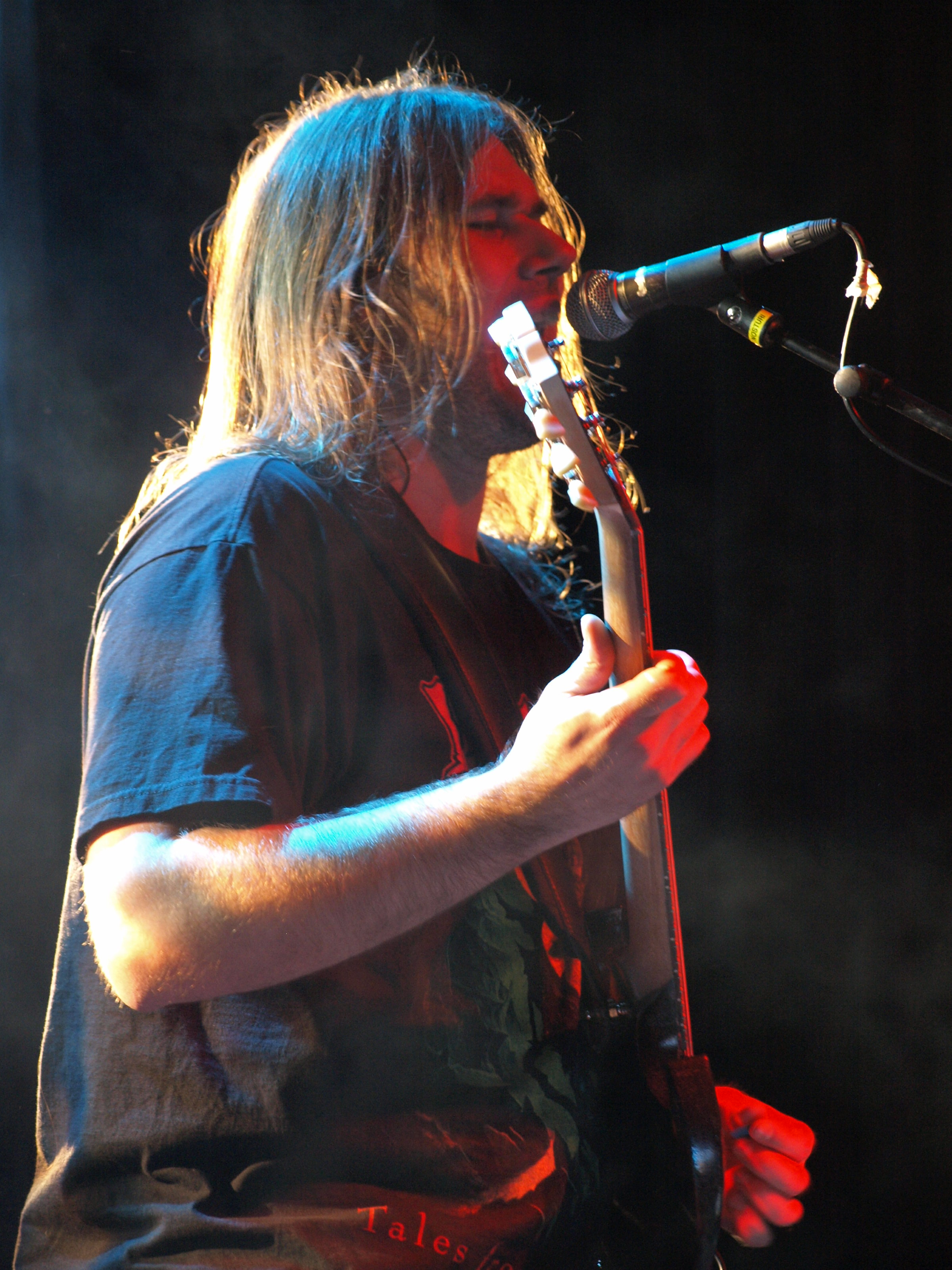
Dan Swanö live at Nosturi

- Albert King
- Amber Bain (The Japanese House)
- Andy Kerr
- Anika Moa
- Babyface
- Barry Winslow (The Royal Guardsmen)
- Benn Jordan
- Bill Staines
- Bob Geldof (The Boomtown Rats)
- Bobby Womack
- Buddy Miles
- Chase Bryant
- Cheick Hamala Diabate (right-handed instruments with original stringing and custom left-handed instruments with backwards stringing) also banjo and ngoni
- Coco Montoya
- Cormac Battle (Kerbdog)
- Dan Seals
- Dan Swanö (Bloodbath, Edge of Sanity, Nightingale, Ribspreader; plays drums right-handed)
- Dave Wakeling (The English Beat, General Public) (writes right-handed)
- Dick Dale
- Doctor Isaiah Ross
- Doyle Bramhall II
- Dywane Thomas Jr.
- Ed Deane
- Ed Harcourt
- Eddy Clearwater
- Elizabeth Cotten (Ruggere 1980:48ff)
- Eric Gales (naturally right-handed, but learned to play left-handed. His left-handed brother taught him that way.)
- Evie Sands
- Glen Burtnik (Styx/solo)
- Graham Russell (Air Supply)
- Gruff Rhys
- Jacek Kaczmarski
- Jim Rooney
- Jimi Goodwin (Doves)
- Jimmy Cliff
- Junior Campbell
- Karl Wallinger (World Party)
- Kris Roe (The Ataris) (right-handed, but plays left-handed)
- Kurt Nilsen (winner of the World Idol competition after winning the first season of the Norwegian Idol series)
- Lætitia Sadier (McCarthy, Monade, Stereolab)
- Lefty Dizz
- Little Jimmy King
- Malina Moye
- Melvin Williams
- Mic Murphy (The System)
- Michael Card
- Morgan
- Nicolas Reyes
- Otis Rush
- Paul Raymond
- Peter LeMarc
- Rick Moranis
- Seal
- Wallis Bird
- Wayman Tisdale

==== Unclassified left-handed players ====
- Arif Sağ (plays bağlama left-handed)
- Emily Robins (on The Elephant Princess)
- John Schumann
- Jon Oliva
- Lari White
- Michael Angelo Batio (ex-Nitro, Manowar) (plays a double guitar ambidextrously)
- Mick Flannery
- Peter Plate (Rosenstolz)
- Peter Steele (Type O Negative; originally played left-handed guitar, but as he switched to bass, he decided to change to right-handed playing due to problems with purchasing a left-handed bass)
- Shirlie Holliman (Pepsi & Shirlie)
- Wendy Wild

=== Bassists ===
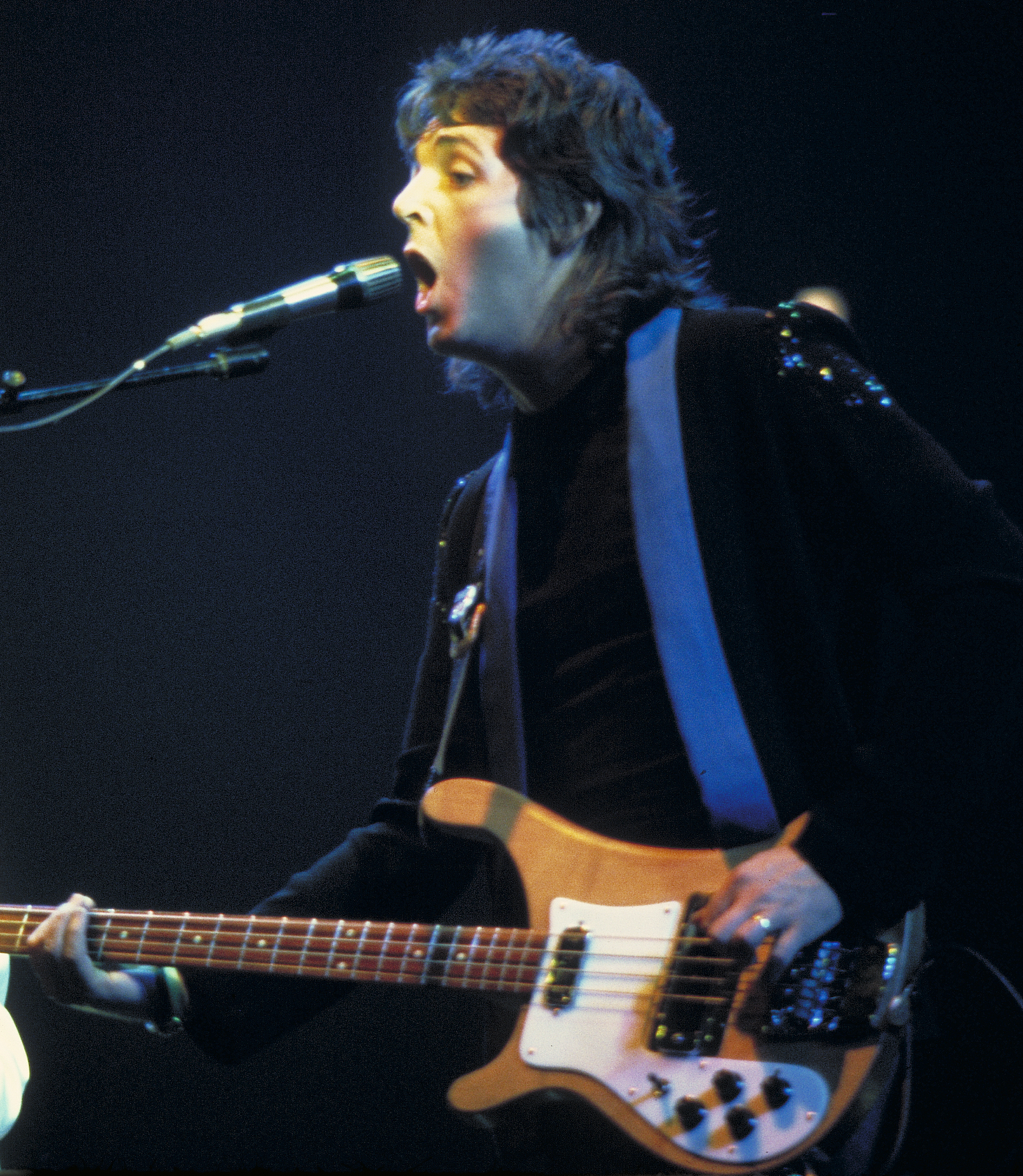
Paul McCartney playing a left-handed Rickenbacker 4001 bass

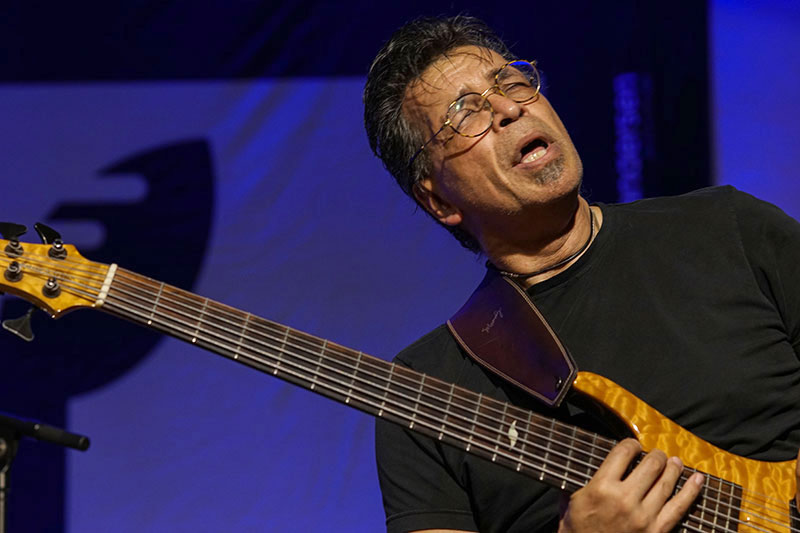
Jimmy Haslip playing a left-handed 6-string bass with strings reversed

- A. W. Yrjänä (CMX)
- Alan Longmuir (Bay City Rollers) (plays both guitar and bass with strings reversed)
- Brad Savage (Band from TV)
- Chas Newby (ex-The Beatles, The Quarrymen)
- Colin Hodgkinson (Back Door, Ten Years After, Whitesnake)
- Danielle Nicole Schnebelen (Trampled Under Foot)
- Doug Lubahn
- Doug Pinnick (King's X)
- Ed Gagliardi (Foreigner) (naturally right-handed, played left-handed to honour his hero, Paul McCartney)
- Flavio Cianciarulo (Los Fabulosos Cadillacs/De la tierra/solo) (plays with strings in correct order, both guitar and bass)
- Frank Healy (Cerebral Fix, Memoriam, Sacrilege) (strings reversed)
- Gary Fletcher (The Blues Band)
- George McArdle (Little River Band)
- Gerald Casale (Devo) (plays strings backwards)
- Jarkko Ahola (Teräsbetoni/Northern Kings/Raskasta Joulua/solo; plays both guitar and bass with strings backwards)
- Jeff Schmidt (bass soloist; plays with strings reversed)
- Jimi Goodwin (Doves) (plays both guitar and bass with strings backwards)
- Jimmy Haslip (Yellowjackets) (plays with strings reversed)
- Joe Long (Frankie Valli and the Four Seasons)
- Josh Newton (Every Time I Die)
- Karl Green (Herman's Hermits)
- Kathy Foster (The Thermals)
- Keith Ferguson (The Fabulous Thunderbirds)
- Ken Casey (Dropkick Murphys)
- Lee Jackson (The Nice)
- Lee Pomeroy (plays with strings reversed)
- Martin Eric Ain (Celtic Frost)
- Mark White (Spin Doctors)
- Nick Feldman (Wang Chung)
- Paul Gray (Slipknot)
- Paul McCartney (The Beatles/Wings/solo) (plays with strings in correct order, both guitar and bass; plays drums right-handed)
- Paul Wilson (Snow Patrol)
- Pete Wright (Crass)
- Robbie Merrill (Godsmack) (right-handed, but plays left-handed because the middle finger of his left hand is disabled)
- Rosemary Butler (Formerly The Daisy Chain and Birtha; now backing and solo vocalist)
- Scott Reeder (Kyuss/The Obsessed/Unida) (plays with strings reversed)
- Sonny T. (plays with strings reversed)
- Stuart Chatwood (The Tea Party)
- Wayman Tisdale (played with strings reversed)
- Yoko Hikasa (Ho-kago Tea Time) (right-handed, but played left-handed)

== Drummers ==
A left-handed drum kit is set up so that the instruments usually played with the right hand on a right-handed setup (ride cymbal, floor tom, etc.) are played with the left hand. The bass drum and hi-hat configurations are also set up so that the drummer plays the bass drum with their left foot, and operate the hi-hat (or, if using two bass drums, plays the second bass drum) with their right foot. Some drummers however have been known to play right-handed kits, but play leading with their left hand (e.g. playing open-handed on the hi-hat). This list does not include drummers who are naturally left-handed while playing drums purely right-handed such as Ringo Starr, Stewart Copeland, Dave Lombardo, Travis Barker, Eric Carr, and Chris Adler.

- Nicke Andersson (Entombed)
- Oli Beaudoin (Neuraxis, Kataklysm)
- Carter Beauford (Dave Matthews Band) (plays on a right-handed drum kit, frequently open-handed)
- Rich Beddoe (Finger Eleven)
- Jim Bonfanti (Raspberries) (plays open-handed)
- Mike Bordin (Ozzy Osbourne, Faith No More) (uses a right-handed setup, but with his primary ride cymbal on his left)
- Bun E. Carlos (Cheap Trick) (alternates between left-handed and right-handed playing)
- Régine Chassagne (Arcade Fire) (plays a right-handed kit, but leads with left hand)
- Billy Cobham (Miles Davis, Mahavishnu Orchestra, solo) (plays a right-handed kit)
- Phil Collins (Genesis, solo)
- Scott Columbus (Manowar)
- Charles Connor (Little Richard)
- Steve Coy (Dead or Alive) (right-handed, but played open-handed on a left-handed kit)
- Jonny Cragg (Spacehog)
- Gabriel Parra (Los Jaivas)
- Joe Daniels (Local H)
- Micky Dolenz (The Monkees) (right-handed, but plays open-handed on a left-handed kit)
- Shawn Drover (Megadeth, Eidolon) (plays open-handed)
- Josh Dun (Twenty One Pilots) (right-handed, but frequently plays open handed)
- Joe English (Paul McCartney and Wings)
- Joshua Eppard (Coheed and Cambria) (right-handed, but plays open-handed)
- Fenriz (Darkthrone) (plays open handed on a right-handed kit; plays guitar and bass right-handed)
- Ginger Fish (Marilyn Manson, Rob Zombie)
- Mike Gibbins (Badfinger)
- Zachary Hanson (Hanson)
- Buddy Harman (Elvis Presley, Patsy Cline, Roy Orbison)
- Ian Haugland (Europe)
- Steve Hewitt (Placebo; plays drums and guitar left-handed)
- Gene Hoglan (Testament)
- Dominic Howard (Muse)
- Tom Hunting (Exodus)
- Mark Jackson (VNV Nation)
- Mika Karppinen (H.I.M.) (plays open-handed)
- Stan Levey (Dizzy Gillespie, Charlie Parker, Frank Sinatra) (right-handed and plays a complete left-handed kit)
- Buddy Miles (Band of Gypsys) (plays right-handed kit, but leads left-handed)
- David Milhous (Lippy's Garden) (right-handed and plays a complete left-handed kit)
- Rod Morgenstein (Dixie Dregs, Winger, Jelly Jam, Platypus)
- Steve Negus (Saga)
- Jerry Nolan (New York Dolls, The Heartbreakers)
- Ian Paice (Deep Purple, Whitesnake)
- Pat Pengelly (Bedouin Soundclash)
- Slim Jim Phantom (Stray Cats)
- Simon Phillips (Toto) (right-handed, but plays open-handed)
- Brett Reed (Rancid)
- Neil Sanderson (Three Days Grace) (plays on a right-handed kit, but leads with left hand)
- Robert Schultzberg (Placebo)
- Al Sobrante (Green Day)
- Sebastian Thomson (Baroness, Trans Am, Publicist)
- Michael Urbano (Smash Mouth) (plays on a right-handed kit, but leads with left hand)
- Hannes Van Dahl (Sabaton)
- Joey Waronker (Beck, R.E.M.)
- Javier Weyler (Stereophonics)
- Fred White (Earth, Wind & Fire)
- Dennis Wilson (The Beach Boys) (played open-handed)
- Eliot Zigmund (Bill Evans, Vince Guaraldi)

== Violinists ==
The violin can be learned in either hand, and most left-handed players hold the violin under the left side of their jaw, the same as right-handed players. This allows all violinists to sit together in an orchestra.

- Richard Barth
- Paavo Berglund (A well known Finnish left-handed conductor who also played violin, often joining orchestra players for chamber music just for fun. Due to the value of his violin collection he did not want to change his instruments and had trained himself to play left-handed on violins with a standard set-up.)
- Charlie Chaplin (wrote right-handed)
- Ornette Coleman
- Rudolf Kolisch
- Ashley MacIsaac
- Giora Schmidt

== Ukulele ==
- Paul McCartney
- Tiny Tim (played guitar right-handed)
- Ian Whitcomb

== Trumpet ==
- Sharkey Bonano
- Freddie 'Posey' Jenkins
- Wingy Manone
- Paul McCartney

== Trombone ==
- Slide Hampton

== Banjo ==
- Elizabeth Cotten
- Cheick Hamala Diabate
- Paul McCartney

== Mandolin ==
- Cheyenne Kimball
- Paul McCartney

== Bansuri ==
- Hariprasad Chaurasia (right-handed, started his career playing the bansuri, a side-blown flute, right-handed, and switched to left-handed playing)

== Bibliography ==
- Cross, Charles (2005), Room Full of Mirrors: A Biography of Jimi Hendrix, Hyperion, ISBN 0-87930-662-9
- Babiuk, Andy (2001), Beatles Gear, Backbeat Books, ISBN 978-0-7868-8841-2
- Ferguson, Jim, ed. (1979), The Guitar Player Book, GPI Publications, ISBN 0-394-17169-1
- Ruggere, Steve (1980). "Left-Handed Guitar: A Look at the Players, Problems, & Products". Guitar Player. 14 (5 (May 1980)): 48–50.
- Stetin, Troy (2001), Left-Handed Guitar: The Complete Method, Hal Leonard, ISBN 978-0-7935-8788-9
- Engel, John (2006), Uncommon Sound: The Left-Handed Guitar Players Who Changed Music, Left Field Ventures, ISBN 2-9600614-0-3, archived from the original on 2007-02-08
