= Tower of Spite =

Album by Cerebral Fix

Studio album by Cerebral Fix
- Released: 1990
- Recorded: Jun – Aug 1990; Rhythm Studios, Leamington Spa, England
- Genre: Thrash metal
- Length: 39:04
- Label: Roadrunner
- Producer: Paul Johnson

Cerebral Fix chronology
Life Sucks... And Then You Die! (1988)	Tower of Spite (1990)	Bastards (1991)

Professional ratings
Review scores
Source	Rating
Allmusic	3/5 stars

Tower of Spite is the second album by Cerebral Fix – a thrash metal band from Birmingham, England. It was released in 1990 on Roadrunner Records and follows the independent label release of Life Sucks... And Then You Die! in 1988. A third album, again on Roadrunner Records appeared a year later, succinctly titled Bastards.

A Tower of Spite demo was given to Roadrunner Records before the band recorded the final release and when the label agreed to sign them, they did a two-night supporting stint of Sepultura at The Marquee in London. Following the album's release, the band toured with Napalm Death – who later returned the favour by appearing in a guest capacity on their last album, Death Erotica.

== Overview ==
The DIY skate/thrash/grindcore approach of the previous outing had been consigned to history and the band started afresh with an effort which was more composed, both musically and in terms of production quality – as would be expected from a switch to a major label. Two line-up changes – ex-Sacrilege members, Frank Healy and Andy Baker – ensured that the band kept up with the changes technically.

== Track listing ==
- All songs written by Cerebral Fix
1. "Unity For Who?" – 1:44
2. "Enter the Turmoil" – 3:20
3. "Feast of the Fools" – 5:08
4. "Chasten of Fear" – 3:32
5. "Circle of the Earth" – 3:50
6. "Tower of Spite" – 4:01
7. "Injecting Out" – 3:30
8. "Quest For Midian" – 5:41
9. "Forgotten Genocide" – 2:54
10. "Culte des Mortes (Part 1)" – 5:50
11. "Closing Irony (Hidden Track)" – 4:27

== Credits ==
- Simon Forrest – vocals
- Tony Warburton – guitar
- Gregg Fellows – guitar
- Frank Healy – bass
- Andy Baker – drums
- Recorded in June – August 1990 at Rhythm Studios, Leamington Spa, England
- Produced, engineered, and mixed by Paul Johnson
- Cover illustrations by Mark Lyden
