= Life Sucks... And Then You Die! =

Studio album by Cerebral Fix
- Released: 1988
- Recorded: Loco Studios, Usk, Wales, UK
- Genres: Thrash metal Crossover thrash
- Length: 33:10
- Label: Vinyl Solution
- Producer: Iain Burgess

Cerebral Fix chronology
We Need Therapy demo (1987)	Life Sucks... And Then You Die! (1988)	Tower of Spite (1990)

Life Sucks... And Then You Die! is the debut album by Cerebral Fix – a thrash metal band from Birmingham, England. The band released it in 1988 on the independent record label Vinyl Solution, and followed it in 1990 with an altogether different sounding album, Tower of Spite, following mass line-up changes and a switch to the major label Roadrunner Records. To support Life Sucks..., the band toured the UK with Bolt Thrower, Deviated Instinct, Doom, Electro Hippies, Concrete Sox, Bomb Disneyland, Hellbastard, Energetic Krusher, and Hard-Ons.

== Overview ==
Following a successful demo in 1987, We Need Therapy, the band was picked up by London based label, Vinyl Solution, and set about recording a raw album which eventually gained exposure via the John Peel Radio 1 programme alongside emerging bands like Napalm Death and Extreme Noise Terror.

== Track listing ==
- All songs written by Cerebral Fix
1. "Warstorm" – 4:13
2. "Cerebral Fix" – 2:57
3. "Looniverse" – 2:30
4. "Give Me Life" – 1:29
5. "Soap Opera" – 0:35
6. "Behind the Web" – 3:24
7. "Product of Disgust" – 2:15
8. "Life Sucks" – 1:17
9. "Power Struggle" – 2:02
10. "Go" – 0:12
11. "Fear of Death" – 1:42
12. "Acid Sick" – 1:56
13. "Skate Drunk" – 1:19
14. "Zombie" – 4:42
15. "Existing Not Living" – 2:34

== Credits ==
- Simon Forrest – vocals
- Tony Warburton – guitar
- Gregg Fellows – guitar
- Steve Watson – bass
- Adrian Jones – drums
- Recorded at Loco Studios, Usk, Wales, UK
- Produced by Iain Burgess
