= Daily Trojan =

Student newspaper of the University of Southern California

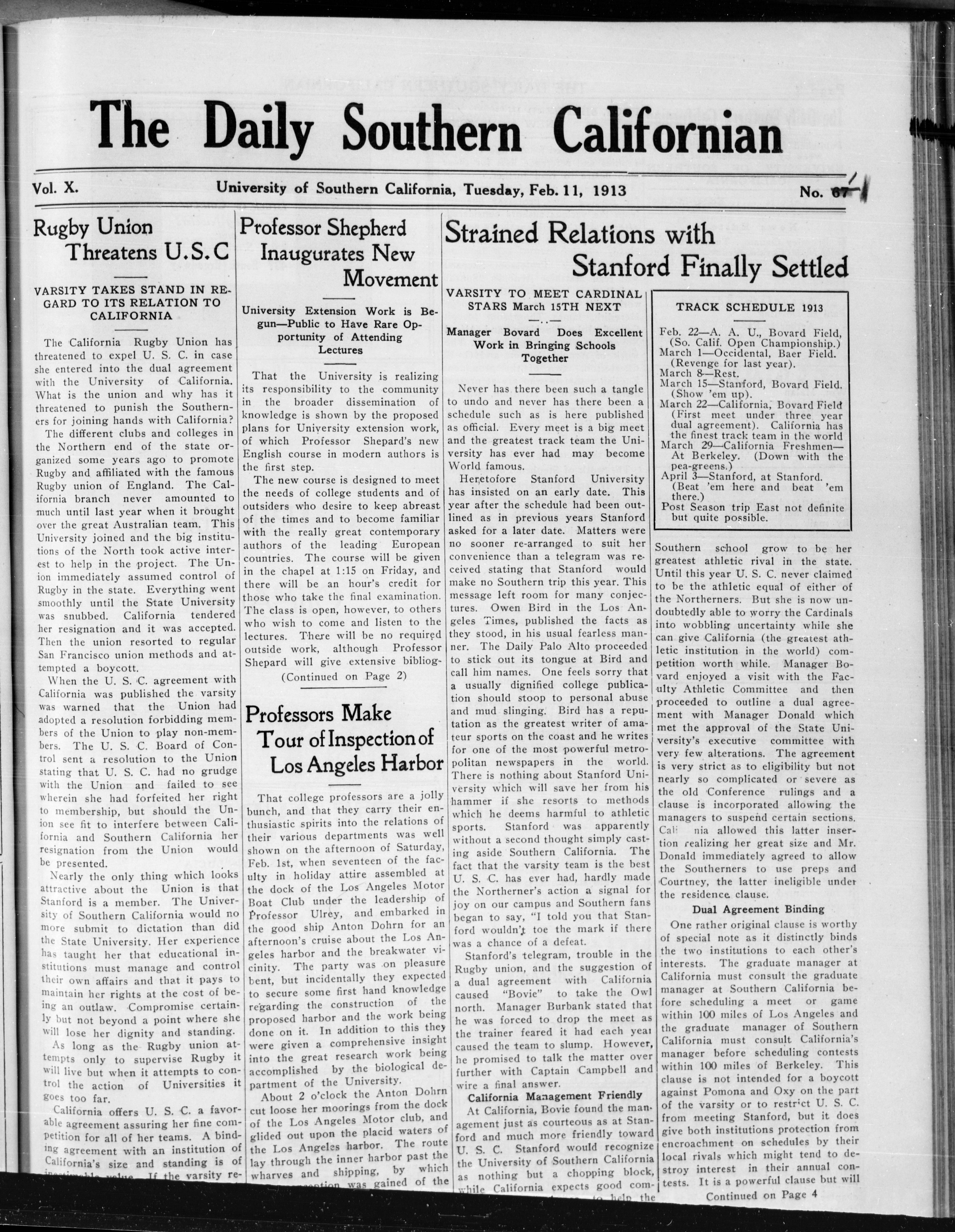
- The Daily Southern Californian, Vol. 10, No. 1, February 11, 1913
- Type: Student newspaper
- Format: Tabloid
- Publisher: University of Southern California
- Editor-in-chief: David Rendon
- Managing editor: Bennett Christofferson
- Founded: 1912
- Language: English
- Headquarters: University of Southern California; Los Angeles, CA; United States
- Circulation: 10,000
- Website: dailytrojan.com

The Daily Trojan, or "DT," is the student newspaper of the University of Southern California. The newspaper is a forum for student expression and is written, edited, and managed by university students. The paper is intended to inform USC students, faculty, and staff on the latest news and provide opinion and entertainment.

== Publication ==
It is published Monday through Friday (during regularly scheduled class days) and distributed at various locations around campus. Articles are also available online at the official Daily Trojan web site. The Daily Trojan is produced weekly as the "Summer Trojan" during the summer session, typically on Wednesdays, from commencement until July.

Although the length of the Daily Trojan varies depending on the volume of advertisements, larger issues throughout the semester include the Orientation Issue, Career Guide, Spanish Supplements and Sports Extras. Starting in 2006, at least four pages (two spreads) of the paper are printed in color. Currently, all pages are printed in color.

Each issue contains a news, opinion, arts & entertainment and sports section. Each section has its own senior editors and staff.

The Daily Trojan is an affiliate of UWIRE, which distributes and promotes its content to their network. The paper also publishes all of its articles online, with some publications, such as podcasts and videos, being available online exclusively. In 2023, the Daily Trojan introduced Daily Trojan Magazine, a completely digital monthly addendum to the paper.

== History ==
The first edition of the newspaper was published September 16, 1912, after W.R. “Ralph” La Porte, the first student editor of the paper, persuaded university President George Finley Bovard to give USC a student newspaper. Subscriptions to the paper, then called The Daily Southern Californian, originally cost $1.75. The newspaper was called The Southern Californian in 1915, after it began publishing only four days a week, but returned to five-day-a-week production in 1925 and was renamed The Daily Trojan, as USC had informally adopted the Trojan as a mascot by then.

The newspaper moved from the now-defunct Moneta Print Shop on Jefferson and University Avenues to its current location in the Student Union in 1928. Production was held off-campus until the 1980s in USC's Graphic Services Department, which was located west of the [Harbor Freeway] on Exposition Boulevard. The Daily Trojan increasingly began using computers in the '90s, moving to all-digital production in 2005. Editors create the paper using Adobe InDesign, Photoshop and Illustrator. The Daily Trojan's first website was created in 1996, and has gone through several iterations.

In December 2024, the paper's funding was severely cut. Student workers will no longer be paid and the paper will go from five print edition days a week to three.

== Organization ==
While the university publishes the Daily Trojan, student editors and staff handle all day-to-day operations. Unlike many university newspapers, the Daily Trojan receives no financial support from the university or from student government funding allocations, and is wholly supported by advertising revenue. The Daily Trojan is part of USC's Office of Student Publications, which is part of USC's Division of Student Affairs. The office oversees the publishing of both the Daily Trojan and El Rodeo yearbook.

== Awards and recognition ==
The Daily Trojan and its staffers earn national, state and regional awards on an annual basis. Listed below are some of the prominent honors the Daily Trojan has received organizationally.

=== National ===
Associated Collegiate Press – Pacemaker Awards

- Newspaper Pacemaker
  - Winner: 2017, 1991
- Online Pacemaker
  - Winner: 2023, 2016

=== State ===
California College Media Association – Excellence in Student Media Awards

- 2010
  - Received six state awards, including first place for General Excellence, second place, Best Overall Design, and second place, Best Arts and Entertainment Story.
- 2018
  - Received 15 state awards, including first-place recognition for Best Editorial, Best Multimedia Presentation, Best Social Media for a Single Event, Best Sports Photo and Best Special Issue/Section
- 2019
  - Received 22 state awards, including first-place recognition for Best Special Issue/Section, Best News Series, Best Podcast, Best Editorial, Best Non-News Video, Best Sports Story, Best Infographic and Best Interactive Graphic
- 2022
  - Received 13 state awards, including first-place recognition for Best Photo Series, Best Overall Newspaper Design, Best Arts & Entertainment, Best Editorial Cartoon, Best Sports Story and Best Features Story.
- 2023
  - Received 17 state awards, including first-place recognition for Best Magazine Inside Page/Spread Design, Best Digital Magazine, Best Special Issue/Section, Best Illustration, Best Infographic, Best Headline Portfolio, Best Photo Illustration, Best Newspaper Column and Best Breaking News Story

== Notable alumni ==
Many staff members for the Daily Trojan have gone on to highly visible positions in media outlets, most prominently satirist Art Buchwald. Other high-profile former staff include:

- Paul Feig, creator of Freaks and Geeks and director of Bridesmaids
- Herb Klein, communications director in the Nixon White House and later a top news executive with Copley Press in California
- Arash Markazi, journalist for Sports Illustrated and ESPN Los Angeles
- David Milhous, Emmy-winning editor of the syndicated TV series Crime Watch Daily
- Dan Povenmire, co-creator of the Disney animated series Phineas and Ferb
- Tucker Reed, author, journalist, feminist and convicted killer
- Justin Chang, film critic for The New Yorker, Los Angeles Times and Fresh Air
- Bob Staake, illustrator and cartoonist
- Lionel Van Deerlin, print and broadcast journalist (primarily in San Diego), U.S. Representative from 1963–81
- Randy Johnson, Hall of Fame Major League Baseball pitcher
