= Bastards (Cerebral Fix album) =

Studio album by Cerebral Fix
- Released: 1991
- Recorded: Rhythm Studios, Leamington Spa, England
- Genre: Thrash metal
- Length: 49:22
- Label: Roadrunner
- Producer: Paul Johnson

Cerebral Fix chronology
Tower of Spite (1990)	Bastards (1991)	Death Erotica (1992)

Professional ratings
Review scores
Source	Rating
Allmusic	link

Bastards is the third full-length studio album from English thrash metal band, Cerebral Fix. It is their second on Roadrunner Records and follows Tower of Spite from the previous year.

One line-up change occurred – Kev Frost replacing Andy Baker on drums and after the release, the band toured the UK and Ireland with death metal band, Obituary. The album was followed up swiftly by Death Erotica in 1992. Two cover versions were included on the album – "No Survivors", originally recorded by punk band GBH, and "Smash It Up" written by legendary band, The Damned. On the latter track, lead vocals were supplied by Blaze Bayley – at the time with Wolfsbane, but soon to be singer with Iron Maiden.

== Track listing ==
1. "Bastards" – 2:16
2. "Descent Into the Unconsciousness" – 5:18
3. "Veil of Tears" – 4:53
4. "Beyond Jerusalem" – 5:15
5. "Return to Infinity" – 4:51
6. "Sphereborn" – 3:55
7. "I Lost a Friend" – 0:49
8. "Ritual Abuse" – 4:56
9. "Mammonite" – 4:32
10. "Middle Third (Mono-Culture) I" – 3:59
11. "Maimed to Beg" – 2:59
12. "No Survivors" (GBH) – 2:47
13. "Smash It Up" (The Damned) – 2:52

== Credits ==
- Simon Forrest – vocals
- Tony Warburton – guitar
- Gregg Fellows – guitar
- Frank Healy – bass
- Kev Frost – drums
- Blaze Bayley – vocals on "Smash It Up"
- Recorded at Rhythm Studios, Leamington Spa, England
- Produced by Paul Johnson
