= Sacrilege (band) =

British band

- Origin: Birmingham, England
- Genres: Crust punk; thrash metal; doom metal (later)
- Years active: 1984–1989; 2014–present
- Labels: Relapse; Children of the Revolution; Earache; Metal Blade; Music for Nations; Under One Flag
- Members: Lynda "Tam" Simpson; Damian Thompson; Frank Healy; Spike T Smith

Sacrilege are a band formed in the Midlands region of England in 1984 by guitarist Damian Thompson, vocalist Lynda "Tam" Simpson, and Tony May. Originally a crust punk band, they switched to thrash metal and finally doom metal. Despite playing few shows during their original run, Sacrilege are recognized as an influence on later crust punk, thrash metal, and doom metal bands, and as an example of blending hardcore punk, radical politics, and thrash/death metal during the mid-1980s, making Sacrilege a prototypical crust punk (that term not coined then) bands of the time.

In July 2014, Sacrilege announced work on a new album, tentatively titled Emptiness Intoxication, after a 25-year hiatus. The line-up included founding members Tam and Damian, bassist Frank Healy, and drummer Spike T. Smith; the same line-up that recorded Turn Back Trilobite, the band's last official release in 1989.

== History ==
Before forming Sacrilege, guitarist Damian Thompson and drummer Andrew Baker released a pair of D-beat punk demos as Warwound. In 1983, the duo joined The Varukers, which Thompson left after less than a year in 1984 to form Sacrilege with Lynda 'Tam' Simpson (vocals), Liam Pickering (drums), and Tony May (bass). In 1984 and 1985, the band recorded demos and contributed tracks to the compilations We Won't Be Your Fucking Poor (Mortarhate, 1985) and Anglican Scrape Attic (a pre-Earache release from Digby Pearson). The band played several shows alongside Chumbawamba, Antisect, D.I.R.T, Icons of filth, Concrete Sox, Indecent Assault, etc., supporting the 1984 miners strike and squatters rights.

After replacing drummer Liam Pickering with Andrew Baker, Sacrilege recorded their first album, Behind the Realms of Madness, in July 1985, at Rich Bitch studios in Birmingham. The album mixed Thompson's downtuned guitar, Simpson's screaming vocals, and strong drumming and bass. It drew from Discharge, Crass, Metallica, Venom, and Slayer. The lyrics dealt with corruption, inequality, poverty, and nuclear war, woven into poetic, fantastical storylines. These themes continued through all three of their early albums. This was released in the UK through the Bristol-based label Children of the Revolution (COR) records, a small independent label run by Tim Bennett which specialized in underground crossover punk/metal acts, and by Pusmort Records in the USA (a limited edition run of 50 copies in blue vinyl are now a valuable collector's item). The album was moderately successful at the time, selling a respectable estimated 7,000 copies (and bringing the group to the attention of a much larger audience/labels). Since then, this album has become widely regarded as a game-changer within underground punk-metal circles and has gone on through various re-issues/bootlegs to sell many thousands more worldwide, influencing numerous bands (the highly successful Bolt Thrower cite the band as an enormous influence, whilst Napalm Death also recorded their first album at Rich Bitch, so impressed were they with Sacrilege's sound). The album was also released at this time in the USA through Pusmort records run by Brian Schroeder a.k.a. Pushead. A US-only limited edition blue vinyl pressing is now a rare collector's item.

Their second release, Within the Prophecy, which saw the band heading further into thrash metal territory, was recorded in January 1987, again at Rich Bitch Studios with engineer Rob Bruce and producer Mike Ivory. It was released later that year through Under One Flag Records, a subsidiary of Music for Nations, and in the USA by Metal Blade records. The album was well received although the production was far from perfect, though some of the band's original punk following did not appreciate the group's more metal direction. Frustrated by a general lack of creative talent, Sacrilege underwent a significant line-up change at this juncture, replacing drummer Baker with Paul Brookes, bassist May with Paul Morrisey, and adding rhythm guitarist Frank Healy. After another change in which they replaced Brookes with new drummer Spike T. Smith, the new line-up recorded the band's third album, Turn Back Trilobite, issued in April 1989. This record saw the band moving away from their punk/thrash metal roots into a more doom metal musical direction with touches of folk, something virtually unheard of within the contemporaries of the time. New members Frank and Spike rose naturally to the ambitious project. This period of the band saw them performing alongside Candlemass, Girlschool, and Sabbat. This album, although now regarded as a classic of its day, was met with many puzzled expressions from fans and press alike as the band strayed away from thrash into highly experimental pieces which were difficult for people to pigeon hole (mixing doom metal, folk, multi-layered harmony vocals, extended acoustic pieces, and even touches of jazz). This was the band's parting shot at that time.

=== 1989–2014 ===
Shortly after recording Turn Back Trilobite, the band quietly went their separate ways. Damian and Tam grew disillusioned by the restrictions and expectations they felt were heaped upon the band. The pair, who were partners throughout this period, went off to live in a converted bus and have two daughters. No official statement was ever made regarding the ceasing of the band at this point. The band has since stated that they never officially split up, preferring to say that they took a 25-year rest. Whilst Bassist Frank Healy went on to eventually join Benediction (after stints in Cerebral Fix and Napalm Death) with whom he still plays, and drummer Spike T Smith joining forces with artists such as Morrissey, The Damned, Steve Ignorant, Conflict, English Dogs, and many others. Guitarist Damian Thompson went on immerse himself into purer forms of 'folk' music, becoming an accomplished wooden flute player within traditional Irish music and taking several extended trips to study classical Indian music in India. Sacrilege are today cited by many people as being ahead of their time during the 1980s in terms of their sound. They are now recognized as a major influence on many later bands and for being unafraid to use musical and idealistic experimentation within the confines of a certain musical genre, even to the detriment of greater commercial appeal. The band has thus maintained a strong underground following amongst its fans. Several unofficial and sometimes poor quality bootleg releases of the band's back catalogue and early demos have appeared during their long absence much to the disappointment of founder members Damian Thompson and Lynda 'Tam' Simpson (who between them wrote the entirety of the group's musical and lyrical content).

=== 2014–present ===
In July 2014, Sacrilege began writing their first new album (provisionally titled Emptiness Intoxication) in 25 years, partly to commemorate 30 years since the band formed and Behind the Realms of Madness was originally released.

November 2015 saw the first ever fully authorized re-issue of Behind the Realms of Madness on Relapse Records, featuring unreleased and brand new material from the band.

As of 2025, no new material has been released. Both Spike T. Smith and Frank Healy joined all-star death metal band Memoriam alongside ex-Bolt Thrower singer Karl Willetts, who cited Sacrilege as one of his biggest personal influences on numerous occasions. Memoriam recorded a cover version of Sacrilege's "The Captive", on which Tam Simpson provided guest vocals.

== Legacy ==
Groups who cited Sacrilege among their major influences include Bolt Thrower and Napalm Death. Cerebral Fix covered Sacrilege's 'The Closing Irony' on their 1990 album 'Tower of Spite', using it as the final track and making a slight name alteration 'Closing Irony'. Napalm Death covered the track 'Lifeline' on 2012's 'Respect your roots' compilation.

== Members ==
- Lynda "Tam" Simpson (vocals)
- Damian Thompson (guitar, also of Warwound, Cadaverous Clan, The Varukers)
- Frank Healey (bass, also of Benediction, Cerebral Fix, Napalm Death)
- Spike T. Smith (drums, also of Conflict, Alternative Attack, The Damned, Destroy Babylon, Morrissey, Steve Ignorant, English Dogs, The More I See)

=== Former members ===
- Mitch Dickinson (guitar, also of Heresy, Unseen Terror, Warhammer)
- Tony May (bass, also of The Varukers, Indecent Assault)
- Paul Morrisey (bass)
- Liam Pickering (drums)
- Andrew Baker (drums, also of Warwound, The Varukers, Cathedral, Cerebral Fix)
- Paul Brookes (drums, also of Benediction)

== Discography ==
=== Sacrilege ===
- Demo I (1984)
- Demo II (1985)
- Behind the Realms of Madness LP (COR Records, 1985)
- Demo 1/86 (1986)
- Demo 8/86 (1986)
- Within the Prophecy LP (Under One Flag Records, 1987; Metal Blade (US)
- Turn Back Trilobite LP (Under One Flag Records, 1989; released in the US on Metal Blade)
- Behind the Realms of Madness 2 x LP (Relapse Records) 2015

=== Compilation appearances ===
- We Won't Be Your Fucking Poor LP x 2 (track: "Dig Your Own Grave"; Mortarhate Records, 1985)
- Anglican Scrape Attic split 7-inch with Hirax, Execute, Lip Cream and Concrete Sox (track: "Blood Run", pre-Earache, 1985)
- Speed Kills LP (Under One Flag) 1987
