= Death to Capitalist Hardcore =

EP by Sore Throat
- Released: 1988
- Recorded: March 3 1988
- Studio: Lion Studios, Leeds
- Genre: Crust punk
- Length: 15:39
- Label: Acid Rain Records
- Producer: Paul "Hammy" Halmshaw

Death to Capitalist Hardcore is an EP by English crust punk band Sore Throat. It was originally released on 7" vinyl by Acid Rain Records in early 1988 to a pressing of 1000 copies, and has been bootlegged multiple times since. The cover artwork depicts a suited man being impaled on a spike, clutching what appears to be a record by Texan hardcore/crossover band Dirty Rotten Imbeciles who, at the time, were enjoying a brief period of commercial success.

The album is an example of micro-songs, with an average song length of less than 20 seconds. Also of note are the several songs attacking other bands, including the shortest (5 second) Fungicidal Tendencies, targeted at Suicidal Tendencies.

== Background ==
Drummer Nicholas Royles said of the experience:

The second time we all met up as a band we recorded the first 7”. Some local friends including Johnny who already had Deaf Records, had formed a record collective and wanted to release Sore Throat as the first record. Again we hadn’t practiced and met up at Lion Studios in Leeds to record the debut EP. The big surprise to me was that the drum kit had been set up on the floor below the recording studio. Previously we had observed each other when to stop start or finish a song. Now that was impossible. We had to shout down microphones the lengths and speed of each song as we recorded and you had to guess when they would end. Fairly ridiculous really but spontaneous blasts of noise was the result. Out of time and out of tune. Also not helped by the fact that I had not really played drums a long time and couldn’t really play them at all. To my ears it all sounds quite horrendous. Still does today.

== Track listing ==
All tracks are written by Sore Throat (Except War System, by Shitlickers).

No.	Title	Length
1.	"Intro (Rapists Die)"	0:15
2.	"War System"	0:52
3.	"D.T.C.H.C"	0:21
4.	"Sacrilege (to the Scene)"	0:15
5.	"Vac Head"	0:08
6.	"Pesticide Death"	0:12
7.	"Process of Elimination"	0:17
8.	"Trenchfoot"	0:05
9.	"S.S.A Part II"	0:05
10.	"Satan's Radish"	0:29
11.	"Fungacidal Tendencies"	0:05
12.	"R.O.T"	0:05
13.	"Only the Dead"	0:12
14.	"Bomb the Whitehouse"	0:28
15.	"Environmental Suicide"	1:08
16.	"Broken Brains/D.Y.W.R" (Two tracks)	0:21
17.	"Devoid of Compassion"	0:14
18.	"Go Home"	0:08
19.	"Attack of the English Gumby Punks"	0:08
20.	"D.F.W.H"	0:05
21.	"Wehr-crap"	0:25
22.	"Intestinal Skipping Rope"	0:10
23.	"Bloody Hardcore"	0:12
24.	"Virus"	0:06
25.	"Disappearing Mark"	0:11
26.	"No Room to Talk"	0:21
27.	"Victim of a Stage Dive"	0:35
28.	"I.C.I: Fuck Off and Die"	1:51
29.	"Thrash Against Fascism"	0:15
30.	"Backflip Splat"	0:25
31.	"Yo Barman"	0:41
32.	"Social Genocide"	0:05
33.	"D.R.I. E.M.I."	0:10
34.	"Born-Again Christian"	0:13
35.	"Utterly Tuneless"	0:56
36.	"M.F.N (Money for Nobheads)"	0:59
37.	"Lynch the Cops"	0:21
38.	"Scream Bloody Trout"	0:05
39.	"Life"	0:15
40.	"Join the Army"	0:08
41.	"The Ballad of Billy Milano"	1:03

== Personnel ==
Sore Throat

- Rich "Militia" Walker (Rawhead Rex) - Vocals, Lyrics, Layout
- Brian "Bri" Talbot (Rancid Trout) - Guitar, Lyrics
- Jon "Doom" Pickering (Howard the Porpoise) - Bass, Lyrics
- Nick Royles (Bilbo Baggins) - Drums, Lyrics

Additional screams by Hammy Plank, Neil Stench Head & Russell Chud

Production

- Guy Hatton - engineering
- Clown - Front cover artwork
- Chris Quarthon - Front cover logo
- Russell Snell - Back cover drawing
