= Grind Madness at the BBC =

Compilation album by various artists
- Released: November 3, 2009
- Recorded: Various periods
- Genre: Grindcore, crust punk, hardcore punk, death metal, industrial metal
- Length: 217:31
- Language: English
- Label: Earache
- Producer: John Peel

Professional ratings
Review scores
Source	Rating
AllMusic	3/5 stars

Grind Madness at the BBC: The Earache Peel Sessions is a 2009 compilation album released by Earache Records. The compilation is a three-disc set featuring old Peel Sessions from the early pioneers and forerunners of the English grindcore scene.

== Track listing ==
=== Disc 1 ===
==== Napalm Death ====
No.	Title	Length
1.	"The Kill"	0:19
2.	"Prison Without Walls"	0:34
3.	"Dead"	0:04
4.	"Deceiver"	0:39
5.	"Lucid Fairytale"	1:05
6.	"In Extremis"	0:06
7.	"Blind to the Truth"	0:22
8.	"Negative Approach"	0:28
9.	"Common Enemy"	0:14
10.	"Obstinate Direction"	1:02
11.	"Life?"	0:37
12.	"You Suffer Pt.2"	0:14
13.	"Multinational Corporations"	1:01
14.	"Instinct of Survival"	1:54
15.	"Stigmatised"	0:52
16.	"Parasites"	0:22
17.	"Moral Crusade"	1:25
18.	"Worlds Apart"	1:22
19.	"M.A.D."	0:52
20.	"Divine Death"	0:57
21.	"C.S. (Conservative Shithead)"	1:08
22.	"Control"	1:16
23.	"Walls" (Siege cover)	1:07
24.	"Raging in Hell" (S.O.B cover)	1:18
25.	"Conform or Die" (S.O.B. cover)	0:48
26.	"S.O.B." (S.O.B. cover)	0:06
27.	"Unchallenged Hate"	1:57
28.	"Mentally Murdered"	2:05
29.	"From Enslavement to Obliteration"	1:30
30.	"Suffer the Children"	4:12
31.	"Retreat to Nowhere"	0:26
32.	"Scum"	2:27
33.	"Deceiver"	0:36
34.	"Social Sterility"	1:07

==== Extreme Noise Terror ====
No.	Title	Length
35.	"False Profit"	0:50
36.	"Another Nail in the Coffin"	1:49
37.	"Use Your Mind"	2:10
38.	"Carry On Screaming"	1:06
39.	"Human Error"	1:34
40.	"Conned Through Life"	1:22
41.	"Only in It for the Music Part 2"	1:42
42.	"Take the Strain"	1:37
43.	"Murder"	2:03
44.	"No Threat"	1:13
45.	"Show Us You Care"	2:02
46.	"Propaganda"	2:01
47.	"System Enslavement"	0:53
48.	"Only in It for the Music Part 3"	1:19
49.	"Work for Never"	1:43
50.	"Subliminal Music (Mind Control)"	1:50
51.	"People Not Profit"	1:19
52.	"Punk Fact or Faction"	1:36
53.	"I Am a Bloody Fool" (Cockney Rejects cover)	2:42
54.	"In It for Life"	1:51
55.	"Deceived"	2:02
56.	"Shock Treatment"	2:31

=== Disc 2 ===
==== Carcass ====
No.	Title	Length
1.	"Crepitating Bowel Erosion"	5:12
2.	"Slash Dementia"	3:26
3.	"Cadaveric Incubator of Endo Parasites"	3:15
4.	"Reek of Putrefaction"	3:36
5.	"Empathological Necroticism"	6:06
6.	"Foeticide"	2:56
7.	"Fermenting Innards"	2:56
8.	"Exhume to Consume"	4:02

==== Bolt Thrower ====
No.	Title	Length
9.	"Forgotten Existence"	3:57
10.	"Attack in the Aftermath"	3:29
11.	"Psychological Warfare"	3:26
12.	"In Battle There Is No Law"	4:13
13.	"Drowned in Torment"	3:08
14.	"Eternal War"	2:29
15.	"Realm of Chaos"	3:01
16.	"Domination"	2:42
17.	"Destructive Infinity"	4:17
18.	"Warmaster"	4:32
19.	"After Life"	4:35
20.	"Lost Souls Domain"	4:02

=== Disc 3 ===
==== Godflesh ====
No.	Title	Length
1.	"Tiny Tears"	3:11
2.	"Wound (Not Wound)"	3:13
3.	"Pulp"	6:10
4.	"Like Rats"	4:11

==== Unseen Terror ====
No.	Title	Length
5.	"Incompatible"	1:12
6.	"Burned Beyond Recognition"	1:14
7.	"Oblivion Descends"	2:06
8.	"Divisions"	1:44
9.	"Voice Your Opinion"	3:15
10.	"Strong Enough to Change"	2:03
11.	"Odie's Revenge"	0:15
12.	"It's My Life"	0:43

==== Heresy ====
No.	Title	Length
13.	"Flowers (In Concrete)"	2:59
14.	"Belief"	0:53
15.	"Network of Friends"	0:50
16.	"Sick of Stupidity"	1:41
17.	"Too Slow to Judge"	1:28
18.	"A Sense of Freedom"	0:52
19.	"Consume"	1:24
20.	"Face Up to It"	0:55
21.	"Into the Grey"	1:34
22.	"When Unity Becomes Solidarity"	2:10
23.	"The Street Enters The House"	1:30
24.	"Cornered Rat"	0:44
25.	"Open Up"	1:38
26.	"Everyday Madness Everyday"	2:16
27.	"Break the Connection"	1:27
28.	"Ghettoised"	0:44
29.	"Network Ends"	2:11
30.	"Release"	1:16
31.	"Genocide"	1:19

==== Intense Degree ====
No.	Title	Length
32.	"Hangin' On"	2:18
33.	"Vagrants"	0:29
34.	"Skate-Bored"	1:27
35.	"Intense Degree"	0:14
36.	"All the Guys"	1:31
37.	"Daydreams"	1:52
38.	"Take No Chances"	0:32
39.	"Future Shock"	1:36
40.	"Politician"	0:35
41.	"Allegiance"	1:30
42.	"Bursting"	1:12
