= Memoriam =

English death metal band

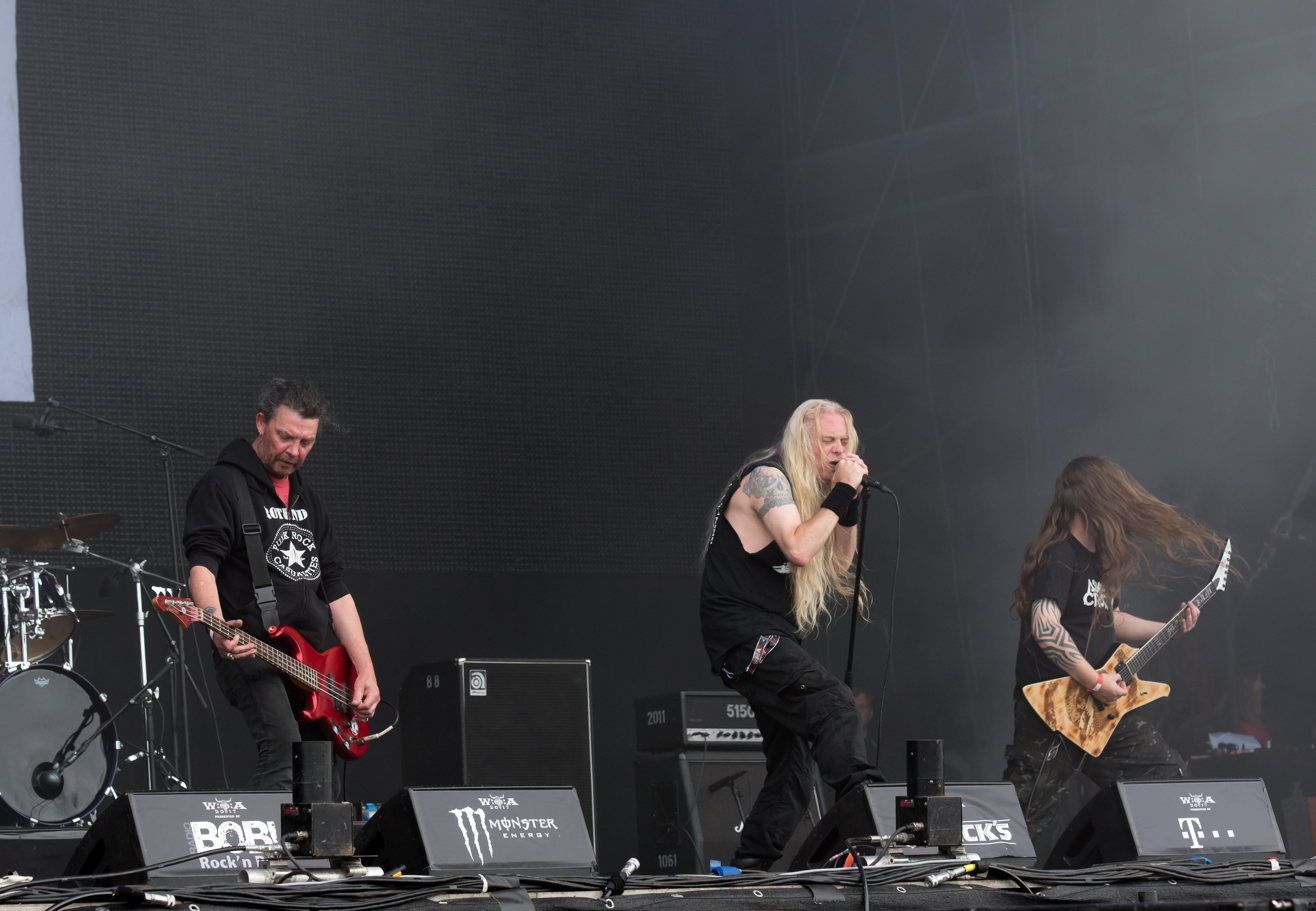
- Memoriam at Wacken Open Air 2017

Background information
- Origin: Birmingham, England
- Genres: Death metal
- Years active: 2016–present
- Labels: Nuclear Blast, Reaper
- Spinoff of: Bolt Thrower
- Members: Karl Willetts; Scott Fairfax; Frank Healy; Spike T. Smith
- Past members: Andy Whale
- Website: https://www.memoriamuk.com

Memoriam are a death metal band from Birmingham, England. The band was formed in 2016 by former Bolt Thrower vocalist Karl Willetts, alongside Scott Fairfax (Ex Benediction & Ex Cerebral Fix) on guitar, Frank Healy (Ex Sacrilege, Ex Benediction & Ex Napalm Death) on bass and Andy Whale (Ex Bolt Thrower) on drums. In 2020, Andy Whale left the band and was replaced by Spike T. Smith (Ex Sacrilege, Ex The Damned). In an interview, Willetts stated that the band were originally formed as a tribute to the late Bolt Thrower drummer Martin Kearns. To date, the band has released five studio albums, two of which reached the charts in Germany, For the Fallen at number 16 and The Silent Vigil at number 32. The band's latest album, Rise to Power, was released on 3 February 2023. The band originally signed to Nuclear Blast, but left after the first three albums for Reaper Entertainment, a new label established by previous Nuclear Blast employee Florian Milz.

In an interview with MetalTalk, Karl Willetts said that work was underway for the next album. "We don't rest on our laurels," he said. "We are driven by Scott's [Fairfax] phenomenal songwriting ability. That is all he does. That's what Scott lives to do. He gets up at breakfast, goes to work, paints four cars, comes home and then throws himself in the studio and writes songs every night. We've probably got enough songs in his closet for about another six albums!"

The band's first fully narrative & performance-based music video for "All is Lost" (from the album "Rise to Power"), directed by Hal Sinden of Eulogy Media Ltd., was released on 9 December 2022.

== Touring & Festival Appearances ==
The band tours actively and has played many of the worlds most notable metal festivals including:

- Obscene Extreme (2016 & 2022)
- Eindhoven Metal Meeting (2016)
- Fall of Summer Festival (2016)
- Party.San (2016 & 2022)
- Wacken Open Air (2017)
- In Flammen (2017 & 2022)
- Roadburn (2017)
- Grasspop Festival (2017)
- Summer Breeze (2017)
- Meh Suff! (2017)
- Ieperfest (2017)
- Copenhell (2017)
- Turock (2017)
- Lords of the Land (2017)
- Rock Hard Festival (2018)
- Inferno Festival (2018)
- Vagos Metal Fest (2018)
- Hellfest (2018 & 2022)
- Bloodstock Open Air (2018 & 2021)
- Midgardsblot (2019)
- Damnation Festival (2021)
- UK Deathfest (2022)
- Dark Easter Metal Meeting (2022)
- Hard Rock Laager (2023)
- Tuska (2023)
- Damnation Festival (2024)

== Band members ==
=== Current ===
- Karl Willetts – vocals (2016–present)
- Scott Fairfax – guitars (2016–present)
- Frank Healy – bass (2016–present)
- Spike T. Smith – drums (2020–present)

=== Former ===
- Andy Whale – drums (2016–2020)

== Discography ==
=== Studio albums ===
- For the Fallen (2017)
- The Silent Vigil (2018)
- Requiem for Mankind (2019)
- To the End (2021)
- Rise to Power (2023)

=== Singles ===
- "The Hellfire Demos" (2016)
- "Surrounded by Death" (2016)
- "The Hellfire Demos II" (2017)
- "The Hellfire Demos III" (2017)
- "All Is Lost" (2022)
- "Total War" (2022)
