= Sore Throat (band) =

British crust punk band

- Also known as: Soar Throat; Saw Throat
- Origin: Huddersfield, England
- Genres: Crust punk
- Years active: 1987–1990; 1991
- Labels: Manic Ears; Earache
- Past members: Rich "Militia" Walker; Brian "Bri" Talbot; John "Doom" Pickering; Nick Royles; Paul "Hammy" Halmshaw

Sore Throat were a British crust punk band formed in Huddersfield in 1987. They are known for being one of the earliest exponents of the grindcore subgenre known as "noisecore", as well as for launching the careers of several prominent members of the British heavy metal community.

== Biography ==
Sore Throat were formed in 1987 by Richard "Militia" Walker (vocals; of Wartorn and Warfear) and Nick Royles (drums). After a short-lived false start that involved Mick Harris & Jim Whitely from Napalm Death on vocals and bass respectively, with Rich actually playing guitar, they soon recruited John "Doom" Pickering (bass; previously a member of Doom, Pelvic Thrust, Police Bastard, and Cain), Brian "Bri" Talbot (guitar; also previously associated with Doom and Pelvic Thrust, as well as Ackworth St. Chaos Front, Metal Motherfuckers from Mars, Bugeyed, Warfear, Woodhouse Rejects, Stalingrad, Blood Sucking Feaks, Devils, and Virtual Reality). The band were vehemently opposed to what they saw as commercialism with the hardcore scene, and used ridicule to lyrically lambast the likes of Napalm Death, Sex Pistols, Suicidal Tendencies, D.R.I., OLD, Wehrmacht, and S.O.D. Other lyrics mocked Nazis, capitalism, and the straight edge movement. The band developed a style completely based on improvisation: all of their musical output was made up on the spot, without rehearsals, during recording sessions.

The band's first release was the Aural Butchery demo, recorded on 20 August 1987, and like other early releases such as the 42 track Death to Capitalist Hardcore EP (1988) and the Noise Annoys demo (1988) consisted largely of raw, sub-one minute blast of grindcore noise; Death to Capitalist Hardcore was later ranked number 14 in Terrorizer Magazine's list of essential European grindcore albums. A line-up change resulted in Paul "Hammy" Halmshaw taking over on drums and after signing to the Meantime label in 1988, Sore Throat released their debut album, Unhindered by Talent, which continued the trend, albeit with a number of more traditional, Discharge-style numbers. Their second album, Disgrace to the Corpse of Sid on Earache, showed even more diversity, incorporating distortion, blast beats, screams and grunts, and sound samples. It featured 101 tracks in total. However, whilst the A side of the album consisted of the band's patented noisecore, the B side contained more doom-inspired crust punk, along the lines of Amebix. The band also released the Inde$troy album in 1989 under the moniker Saw Throat, through Manic Ears Records.

Sore Throat released their final full-length album, Never Mind the Napalm... Here's Sore Throat, in 1989, returning to their crust punk roots. A number of other releases followed, including the Soar Throat EP, the And We Don't Care compilation and the Poison Idea / No Handle Beer demo (featuring two Poison Idea covers and one original track), but Sore Throat disbanded in 1990 due to the band coming to "its logical conclusion."

Vocalist Rich Walker was already involved with Sludgelord and went on to play in the doom metal band Solstice and epic heavy metal group Isen Torr, as well as some hardcore bands like Wartorn, Warfear, Discontrol, Nailbomb and Harmony As One, all of whom released records in the early 1990s. He currently runs his own label The Miskatonic Foundation and plays guitar in Solstice. Guitarist Brian Talbot went on to play with doom metal group Khang (latterly Lazarus Blackstar). Bassist John Pickering became a DJ at Radio Kerrang! Original drummer Nick Royles went on to play in several straight edge bands namely Withstand, In Touch, No Way Out, Steadfast, Ironside, Unborn, Season of War and Unquiet Grave. He ran Sure Hand Records and the influential How We Rock Fanzine in the 90s. He also became a DJ with his own club night playing Gypsy Punk and Balkan turbo folk. Currently playing in Howl and Cracked Cop Skulls. Paul Halmshaw founded Peaceville Records.

In 1991, the band briefly reformed with Royles returning on drums. They played a single performance at the 1 in 12 Club, and planned to release an EP, however broke up for a second time before it could be negotiated.

On 4 February 2022, the band announced on their official Facebook page that they "were bored last Monday afternoon so we recorded 25 new songs of which 22 will be released as a 22 song 12-inch vinyl EP". The title was revealed to be Starving Wolves Stand & Fight! with the release date being 6 May on Bandcamp.

== Members ==
- Rich "Militia" Walker – vocals (1987–1990, 1991)
- Brian "Bri" Talbot – guitar (1987–1990, 1991)
- John "Doom" Pickering – bass (1987–1990, 1991)
- Nick Royles – drums (1987–1988, 1991)
- Paul "Hammy" Halmshaw – drums (1988–1990)

== Discography ==
=== Official releases ===
- Aural Butchery demo (1987)
- Death to Capitalist Hardcore EP (also known as self-titled EP) (1988) (Acid Rain Records)
- [Death to Capitalist Hardcore] (Cassette Tape)(2022) (Grindtoday Records)
- Noise Annoys demo (1988)
- Unhindered by Talent LP/cassette (1988) (Meantime Records)
- Disgrace to the Corpse Of Sid LP/CD (1988) (Earache Records) &(Cassette Tape)(2022) (Grindtoday Records)
- Inde$troy LP/CD (1989)(Manic Ears) (the band went under Saw Throat for this release) (LP rerelease on Epistrophy Records and Skuld releases in 2006, CD rerelease in 2006 on s.o.a.) & (Cassette Tape)(2023) (Grindtoday Records)
- Never Mind the Napalm... MLP/cassette (European edition: 60 tracks, USA edition: 16 tracks) (1989) & (Cassette Tape)(2022) (Grindtoday Records)
- Soar Throat EP (the band went under the name Soar Throat for this release) (1989)
- And We Don't Care CD (1989)
- Poison Idea / No Handle Beer demo (two Poison Idea covers and one original track) (1989)
- Death to Capitalist Halmshaw (featuring all Sore Throat demo tracks, the Death To Capitalist Hardcore EP and rare live material and unreleased material) (2006)
- Disgrace to the Corpse of Sid & Unhindered By Talent CD (re-released) (2010) (Earache Records)
- Who Killed Gumby? (The first ever Sore Throat recording, made in Rich Militia's bedroom in May 1987) (2021) (FOAD Records) & (Cassette Tape)(2022) (Grindtoday Records)
- Starving Wolves Stand & Fight! EP (Cassette Tape)(2022) (Grindtoday Records)
- Pick Your King, E.P (Cassette Tape)(2023) (Grindtoday Records)

=== Compilations featuring Sore Throat ===
- A Vile Peace LP (Peaceville)
- Spleurk LP (Meantime)
- Grindcrusher LP (Earache)
- The Hysterical Years CD (Manic Ears)
- Six Ways 7-inch LP (Komist-A))
- Summertime Sampler 7-inch flexi (Skateboard magazine)
- Volnitza LP (1 In 12 Records)
- metal a headbangers comapanion 2 LP (Earache)

=== Bootlegs ===
Aside from their official discography, Sore Throat have been heavily bootlegged. Rich Walker commented that bootlegging of T-shirts has been especially prevalent. All Sore Throat albums have also been bootlegged on both CD and vinyl; some examples include:

- Abraham's Ear 7-inch EP (Aural Butchery demo released with bonus live tracks)
- Death to Capitalist Hardcore EP (bootlegged three times with red/black sleeve)
- Death to Capitalist Grindcore LP
- Death to Capitalist Thrashcore LP
- F.O.A.D. studio/live LP (first half of this release is Walker's post-Sore Throat band Sludgelord)
- Algo Que Nunca Fue CD
- Encerrado En El Trago CD
