= Alison Triessl =

American lawyer

- Education: Tulane University (BA), New York Law School (JD)
- Occupation: Criminal defense attorney
- Years active: 1997–present
- Known for: Legal Correspondent for Access Hollywood with Mario Lopez
- Television: The Today Show, Good Morning America, and The Early Show
- Website: https://alisontriessllaw.com/

Alison Triessl is a criminal defense lawyer based in Los Angeles, California who specializes in assault, drug and third strike cases.

== Education ==
Triessl received her undergraduate degree in Political Science from Tulane University and graduated with her Juris Doctor from New York Law School.

== Career ==
Triessl started practicing law in California 1997 and has represented the family of Monica Burgos, who was murdered in Mexico by her husband Bruce Beresford-Redman, Perry Alexander Jr., and Lois Goodman, a US Open referee accused of murdering her husband with a coffee mug (her case was ultimately dismissed by the Los Angeles District Attorney's Office). Triessl has also provided legal commentary on a variety of local and national television programs, including Dr. Drew On Call, Dr. Phil, Good Morning America, Inside Edition, Jane Velez-Mitchell, Nancy Grace, The Early Show, Extra, The Insider, and Today. Cases for which she has provided legal commentary include the Jodi Arias murder trial, the George Zimmerman verdict, the Jackson vs. AEG trial, the Kelly Thomas verdict, prosecutions of Miranda Barbour, the Oscar Pistorius trial, the investigation into allegations that Stephen Collins molested underage girls, Robin Thicke's copyright infringement lawsuit, the Ferguson indictment verdict, and the guilty verdict in the Chris Kyle trial.

Triessl was the 2009 President of the Los Angeles County Criminal Courts Bar Association and co-founder and CEO of the Pasadena Recovery Center, a drug and alcohol treatment center established in 2000 with her father, psychiatrist Dr. Lee Bloom. Celebrity Rehab with Dr. Drew (later called simply Rehab with Dr. Drew), a reality television show which chronicled people as they are treated for alcohol and drug addiction by Drew Pinsky, was filmed at the center. She also created the website and mobile app Wild About Trial, which provides users with updates to cases from local reporters and provides access to court documents and legal commentary. Notable trials covered by the app includes those for Aaron Hernandez and James Holmes.

Legal Smart with Alison Triessl began airing on KTLA in July 2015; the segment airs on Tuesdays and Thursdays at 3pm locally. Since September 2015, she has contributed to the syndicated investigative news magazine series Crime Watch Daily.

== Recognition and personal life ==
In 2006, Triessl was named "Woman of the Year" for Los Angeles County and received an honor for "Outstanding Community Service" from both the Lieutenant Governor and City Attorney. She is married and has three sons.

== Works ==
- "Net Worth Over Self-Worth: Anyone with the Last Name of Sterling Need Not Apply". The Huffington Post. May 14, 2014.
