= Death Erotica =

Studio album by Cerebral Fix
- Released: 1992
- Recorded: Rhythm Studios, Leamington Spa, England
- Genre: Thrash metal
- Length: 57:10
- Label: Music For Nations/ Under One Flag
- Producer: Paul Johnson

Cerebral Fix chronology
Bastards (1991)	Death Erotica (1992)

Death Erotica is the fourth full-length studio album from English thrash metal band, Cerebral Fix. It was released on Music For Nations in 1992 and follows the previous year's album, Bastards. It is their final album to date. Guest musician spots were taken by members of Napalm Death, Pop Will Eat Itself, and Marshall Law on cover versions of songs by Discharge and Judas Priest. To support the album, the band toured the UK with Paradise Lost. They also toured Europe with Cancer, but with two new members because Fellows and Healy had left after the UK tour.

== Track listing ==
- All songs written by Cerebral Fix, unless otherwise stated
1. "Death Erotica" – 1:03
2. "World Machine" – 5:10
3. "Clarissa" – 5:45
4. "Haunted Eyes" – 5:43
5. "Mind within Mine" – 4:31
6. "Angel's Kiss" – 4:39
7. "Still in Mind" – 1:43
8. "The Raft of Medusa" – 6:17
9. "Splintered Wings" – 5:45
10. "Creator of Outcasts" – 5:52
11. "Never Again" (Discharge) – 2:37
12. "Too Drunk to Funk" – 2:59
13. "Burning" – 1:12
14. "Livin' after Midnight" (Judas Priest) – 3:54

== Credits ==
- Simon Forrest – vocals
- Tony Warburton – guitar
- Gregg Fellows – guitar
- Frank Healy – bass
- Kev Frost – drums
- Clint Mansell (Pop Will Eat Itself) – backing vocals on "Never Again"
- Mark "Barney" Greenway (Napalm Death) – backing vocals on "Never Again"
- Shane Embury (Napalm Death) – vocals on "Too Drunk to Funk"
- Tony Mills (Slam) – vocals on "Livin' After Midnight"
- Andy Pike (Marshall Law) – vocals on "Livin' After Midnight"
- Recorded at Rhythm Studios, Leamington Spa, England
- Produced by Paul Johnson
