= Human Error (album) =

Studio album by Unseen Terror
- Released: December 1, 1987
- Recorded: September 1987 at Rich Bitch Studios
- Genre: Grindcore
- Length: 45:54
- Label: Earache

Professional ratings
Review scores
Source	Rating
AllMusic	4.5/5 stars

Human Error is an album by British band Unseen Terror. It was originally released in December 1987, and re-released in 2001 with six bonus tracks.

== Track listing ==
1. "Unseen Terror" – 3:34
2. "Oblivion Descends" – 2:20
3. "Divisions" – 1:50
4. "Death Sentence (Of the Innocent)" – 2:18
5. "Nermal" – 0:11
6. "Ignorant Scene" – 1:38
7. "Uninformed" – 2:02
8. "Expulsion of Wrath" – 1:44
9. "Garfield for President" – 0:43
10. "Burned beyond Recognition" – 1:19
11. "Winds of Pestilence" – 1:28
12. "Hysteria" – 1:41
13. "In a Shallow Grave" – 0:58
14. "Odie's Revenge" – 0:16
15. "Deliverance" – 2:19
16. "The End Product" – 2:20
17. "To Live and Learn" – 1:34
18. "Charred Remains" – 1:18
19. "Beyond Eternity" – 3:27
20. "Garfield Strikes Again" – 2:18
21. "Beyond Eternity" (2001 bonus track) – 3:13
22. "Expulsion of Wrath" (2001 bonus track) – 1:37
23. "Scarred" (2001 bonus track) – 0:49
24. "Walls" (2001 bonus track) – 0:42
25. "Human Error" (2001 bonus track) – 2:11
26. "Within Without" (2001 bonus track) – 1:23

== Credits ==
- Shane Embury - drums
- Mitch Dickinson - vocals, guitar, bass
