= Instigators =

British anarcho-punk band

- Origin: Dewsbury, England
- Genres: Punk rock; anarcho-punk
- Years active: 1980–present
- Labels: Bluurg, Peaceville
- Members: Andy Turner Simon Mooney Gary Jackson Dan Le-Billon
- Past members: Paul "Hammy" Halmshaw; Simon Mooney; Simon Bridgewater; Simon Elsey; Barbara Drye; Nicky Djorjevic "Tompo"; Darren Dean; Tez Turner; Andrew Turnbull; Steve Curran

Instigators are an anarcho-punk band from Dewsbury, England, formed in 1980. The original line-up split up in the mid-1980s, but the band carried on into the 1990s. As of 2025, the band reformed with founding member Simon Mooney reuniting with Andy Turner and recruiting Gary Jackson on bass and Dan Le-Billon on drums. This reformation lead to a number of dates played in the UK, notably the first gig Instigators had played in 32 years at Rebellion Festival in Blackpool, followed by a homecoming gig in Huddersfield plus dates in London and then Poland where a live session was recorded and released as a benefit album by Sanctus Propaganda.

== History ==
The band was formed in 1980 by drummer Paul "Hammy" Halmshaw and guitarist Simon Mooney, both students at Thornhill High School, and the line-up was completed by Simon "Semi" Bridgewater (vocals) and Nicky Djorjevic (bass Guitar). They took the name Instigators on the suggestion of Ritchie Calvert of the band Disintegrated. The band's first live performance was in summer 1982. Influences on the band included Crass and Flux of Pink Indians.

Djorjevic left to be replaced by "Tompo", who only lasted a few months, playing on the band's first demo, before being replaced himself by Simon "Tab" Elsey. Bridgewater also left for a short time and later became a Web Developer, his replacement Daz Dean. The band's demo got the band a support slot for Flux of Pink Indians in November 1982, and they recorded two further demos, all three getting released on a cassette on Halmshaw's Peaceville Records label, gaining the band more fans. Barbara Drye also added some further input into the band by singing a couple of songs with 'Aggression' been one of them. The band were given another support slot in May 1983, opening for Subhumans in Bradford, a performance that was recorded by Subhumans vocalist Dick Lucas and released through his Bluurg label. Bluurg also released the band's first EP, The Blood is on Your Hands, which reached number 21 on the UK Independent Chart. The 1985 LP release Nobody Listens Anymore increased their popularity, reaching number 18 on the Indie Albums Chart, and securing them a spot on Pusmort's Cleanse the Bacteria compilation LP.

Bridgewater left later that year after an argument, and the band recruited Andy "Tez" Turner (formerly of Xpozez) as his replacement. Halmshaw and Elsey also soon left, with Mooney and Turner continuing with Andrew "Trimble" Turnbull (Also formerly of Xpozez) on bass guitar and Steve "Cuzzy" Curran on drums. The band's sound changed with the new line-up, taking on a more American influence. They went on to tour Europe and the United States and continued into the 1990s.

Halmshaw went on to front Civilised Society, and continued to develop his Peaceville label.

== Discography ==
=== Singles, EPs ===
- The Blood Is on Your Hands 7-inch EP (1984), Bluurg, Fish 6 - UK Indie No. 21
- Recorded Live in Denmark Feb '86 7-inch EP (1986), Mystic
- "Eye to Eye" (1986), Mystic
- "Full Circle" 7-inch (1987), Double A
- "Invasion" 7-inch (1988), Super Seven
- "Toshiyuki Hiraoka/With The Instigators–Personal Progress" 7-inch (1990), Deco Record

=== Albums ===
- Demo (cassette) (1982)
- Demo (cassette) (1983)
- Demo (cassette) (1984)
- Live in Leeds (cassette) (1983), Bluurg
- It Has To Be Stopped Live (cassette) (1984), 96 Tapes
- All Creatures Great And Small Live (cassette) (1984), Bluurg
- Nobody Listens Anymore (1985), Bluurg, Fish 11 - UK Indie No. 18
- We Are The Race Of The Media Fix Live (cassette), (1985) Bluurg
- Shrapnel, Instigators–Live At St.Phillips Community Centre. (cassette), (1985)
- Live In Leeds (cassette), (1985)
- Demo (cassette), (1986)
- Phoenix (1986), Bluurg, Fish 13
- Instigators Live At Huset, Arhus, Denmark, 15 February 1986 (1987), self-released, later licensed to Calypso Now
- Wall of Sound - Live in Berlin (1988), Meantime
- Live (1988) Black Box Records
- Shockgun (1988), Flipside, FLIP 16
- New Old Now (1989), Peaceville
- Recovery Sessions (1990), Full Circle
- Demo (cassette) (1993)
- Dine Upon the Dead (2002), Blackfish - compilation
- The Blood Is On Your Hands (LP) (2015), RuinNation
- Nobody Listens Anymore (30th Anniversary Edition) (LP) (2015), RuinNation
