= Grindcrusher =

Compilation album by various artists
- Released: 1991
- Genre: Grindcore; death metal; crossover thrash; thrashcore; industrial metal
- Label: Earache

Professional ratings
Review scores
Source	Rating
AllMusic	4.5/5 stars

Grindcrusher is a CD/LP released by Earache Records in 1989, showcasing nine of the label's bands. It contained a number of pioneer grindcore and death metal groups such as Napalm Death, Bolt Thrower, Morbid Angel, Carcass and Repulsion. The compilation was re-released in 1991 as Grindcrusher: The Ultimate Earache, augmented with 14 extra tracks by the likes of Entombed and Nocturnus.

== Track listing ==
1. Morbid Angel – "Chapel of Ghouls"
2. Repulsion – "Radiation Sickness"
3. Carcass – "Exhume to Consume" (this version is different from the one that appears on the LP Symphonies of Sickness)
4. Godflesh – "Streetcleaner" (minus the intro that appears on the LP Streetcleaner)
5. Terrorizer – "Dead Shall Rise"
6. Hellbastard – "Justly Executed"
7. Carnage – "Malignant Epitaph"
8. Naked City – "Osaka Bondage"
9. Filthy Christians – "Extremely Bad Breath"
10. Old Lady Drivers – "Colostomy Grab Bag"
11. Intense Degree – "I've Got A Cure"
12. Sore Throat – "Horrendify and Kill"
13. Napalm Death – "Malicious Intent"
14. Entombed – "But Life Goes On"
15. Nocturnus – "BC/AD"
16. Bolt Thrower – "World Eater"
17. Lawnmower Deth – "Satan's Trampoline"
18. Cadaver – "Hypertrophian"
19. Sweet Tooth – "Fat City"
20. Mighty Force – "Thrashing a Dead House"
21. Spazztic Blurr – "He-Not-A-Home-Me-Marco"
22. Heresy – "Release"
23. Unseen Terror – "Divisions"
24. Napalm Death – "You Suffer"
