= Concrete Sox =

British crust punk band

- Origin: Nottingham, United Kingdom
- Genres: Crossover thrash, crust punk
- Years active: 1984–1999, 2009-present
- Label: SoxCore Records
- Members: Vic Timoveric (founder); Michèle Croll; Lambert; Dave "Brownie" Brown; Joe 'Pug' Nott
- Past members: Rich Button; Sean Cook; Leslie Duly; Mark Greenwell; Ian Halpin; Rich Lamell; Lloyd Sims; John March; Kalvin Piper; Andy Sewell
- Website: http://concretesox.org/

Concrete Sox are a British crust punk band. They are largely seen as an early crossover thrash band who incorporated many thrash metal-like riffs in the style of their earlier recordings.

== History ==
Formed in 1984 following jam sessions with Gabba (Chaos UK/F.U.K.), Kalv (Heresy/Geriatric Unit) and various friends, the band was founded by Vic Timoveric with Les Duly. Not set on a permanent name, they once gigged as "Concrete Evidence", but the name "Concrete Sox" (Timoveric's parody of a Nottingham band "Steam Roller Gloves") became the band's official name.

Their first release was the LP Your Turn Next in 1985 on COR records followed by a split LP with Heresy on Earache Records in 1986.

Concrete Sox were one of the more established of the British hardcore / crust punk influenced thrash bands during the mid- to late 1980s. They are also known as being one of the early bands who were part of the punk/metal crossover music genre (along with other bands such as Sacrilege, English Dogs, Onslaught, and Deviated Instinct).

For several years their early work was out of press, but Your Turn Next and Whoops Sorry Vicar were re-released in September 2012 on the band's own label, SoxCore Records, in association with Boss Tuneage. The vinyl versions are on coloured vinyl and the CD releases have bonus tracks personally selected by Timoveric. New T-shirts were released at the same time in Japan. Most of their recordings are also available via peer-to-peer networks and the band have made all their releases available for free through MediaFire.

Concrete Sox reformed in 2009 with a new line-up. After an unsuccessful tour in April 2010 (which was cancelled by the band after three shows), this line-up was disbanded. As of December 2012, founding member Vic Timoveric was working with a new line-up, which included the return of Pug on drums with additional members Lambert (vocals) and Brownie (bass). After 4–5 months of getting nowhere, Timoveric decided to disband the group for good.

== Members ==
=== Current line-up ===
- Vic 'Timoveric' Croll (guitar, vocals) (1984–1987, 2009–2013)
- Dave 'Brownie' Brown (bass, vocals)
- Joe 'Pug' Nott (drums, vocals)

=== Former members ===
- Lambert (vocals)
- Sean Cook (vocals; 1986–1989, 1992–1996, 1999)
- Lloyd Sims (vocals; 1989–1992, 1997–1998)
- John March (drums, vocals; 1984–1986; also of Heresy)
- Andy Sewell (drums; 1986–1996, 1999; also of City Indians)
- Les Duly (1984–1993, 1997)
- Kalvin Piper (1987; also of Heresy)
- Rich Lamell (bass; 1997–1999)
- Rich Button (guitar; 1987–1989)
- Ian Halpin (guitar; 1989–1991)
- Mark Greenwell (guitar; 1991–1996, 1997–1999)

== Discography ==
- Demo 1985
- Your Turn Next LP (C.O.R., May 1985; re-released (with bonus tracks) 2003 by Speedstate)
- Split LP with Heresy (Earache, 1987)
- Whoops Sorry Vicar! LP (Manic Ears, 1987; re-released 2003 (with bonus tracks) by Speedstate)
- Demo 1988
- Sewerside LP (Big Kiss, 1989)
- Lunched Out 7-inch EP (Desperate Attempt, 1990)
- Split 7-inch EP with Nightmare (MCR, 1991)
- Another Time (compilation of Whoops Sorry Vicar! and Your Turn Next; Weasel, 1992)
- Live VIDEO VHS tape, includes patch (MCR, 1992)
- Japan Tour '92 live LP (MCR, 1993)
- No World Order LP (Lost & Found, 1993)
- Silence 7-inch EP (Blind Destruction, 1997)
- The New E.P. 7-inch EP (Data, 1999)
- Your Turn Next LP/CD (SoxCORE Records/Boss Tuneage 2012 re-release)
- Whoops Sorry Vicar! LP/CD (SoxCORE Records/Boss Tuneage 2012 re-release)
- Sewerside CD (Black Konflik, 2020)

=== Compilation appearances ===
- Anglican Scrape Attic split 7-inch flexi-disk with Hirax, Execute, Lip Cream and Sacrilege (track: "Eminent Scum"; pre-Earache, 1985)
- Smelling Just Another Bad Breath (track: "Wipeout"; Double A Records (GER) 1986)
- Digging in Water (track: "Senile Fools"; COR, 1987)
- The North Atlantic Noise Attack (track: "Eminent Scum"; Manic Ears, 1989)
- Discharged: A Tribute to Discharge (tracks: "Death Dealers/Is This to be"; 1992)
- Grind Your Mind: A History of Grindcore (track: "Senile Fools"; Mayan, 2007)
