= Unseen Terror =

British extreme metal band

- Origin: Broseley, Shropshire, England
- Genres: Extreme metal; grindcore
- Years active: 1986–1990
- Labels: Strange Fruit, Earache
- Members: Mitch Dickinson; Shane Embury
- Past members: Pete Giles; Mick Harris

Unseen Terror was a British extreme metal band formed by Mitch Dickinson (Heresy) and Shane Embury (later of Napalm Death), and played extreme metal with a technical edge along with elements of hardcore punk. Their most notable feat took place in March 1988, when they recorded tracks for John Peel's BBC Radio 1 program.

== History ==
The band formed after the demise of Warhammer, which consisted of Wayne Aston, Mike Clarke, Mitch Dickinson and Shane Embury.

Unseen Terror was named after Dickinson was listening to Septic Death. The song "Terrorain" by Septic Death has the lyric "Unseen Death - Terrorain". The Chernobyl disaster was fresh in the minds of many at the time, and Dickinson thought of the term "Unseen Terror", as the radiation in the air around the area of the disaster was invisible. The band was founded in early 1986 by singer/guitarist Dickinson and Embury. The duo wrote many songs together as a two-piece band during mid-1986 to mid-1987. These tracks were recorded on to cassette during rehearsals. These rehearsal tapes were subsequently distributed on an international level via the tape-trading network of the time. These tapes caught the attention of Digby Pearson, who had recently founded Earache Records.

A few months into 1987, the band were invited to contribute two tracks to the compilation LP Diminished Responsibility (1987), and the group landed a record contract at Earache Records.

Just after the recording of the tracks for this compilation LP, the band recruited Pete Giles as their bass player. This line up did not last very long. Earache Records booked the recording studio for the recording of Human Error during a time when there were various difficulties occurring (both logistically and personally) for the band. These unchangeable dates in September 1987 for the recording ultimately meant that Dickinson and Embury had no choice but to fulfil the agreement with Earache as a 2-piece band. The original album back cover photographs were taken on location in Broseley, Shropshire, England (by Pearson).

After their debut album, Napalm Death drummer Mick Harris joined the band as singer. The band were invited by John Walters to a recording session for BBC Radio One. A one-off performance in Nottingham with bassist Aston (Ex-Warhammer) took place prior to the recording of the session, but Wayne did not go on to appear on the Peel sessions recordings. The BBC session saw Dickinson and Harris share vocal duties on different songs during the session.

The Peel sessions were released as a limited 12" EP in the UK and a CD (with uncommissioned artwork) in the US. These original releases are now regarded as collector's items.

After the BBC session, the band reverted to the original line up of Dickinson and Embury. This line up was bolstered in early 1989 by the addition of Carl Stokes (Cancer) who joined on bass guitar. This was to be the last line up of the band. The band finally broke up later that year.

More recently, re-releases of the BBC session occurred on the Earache compilation Grind Madness at the BBC.

== Band members ==
=== Constant ===
- Mitch Dickinson - vocals, guitar (1986–1990)
- Shane Embury - drums (1987–1990)

=== Others ===
- Carl Stokes - bass (1989)
- Wayne Aston - bass (1988)
- Pete Giles - bass (1987)
- Mick Harris - vocals (1988)

== Discography ==
- Rehearsal demo tape (1987)
- Diminished Responsibility (comp LP), 1987
- Human Error (album, Earache Records, 1987)
- Hardcore Holocaust, 1989
- Hardcore Holocaust II, 1989
- The Peel Sessions (12", Strange Fruit Records, 1989)
- 21 Years of Alternative Radio One, 1989
- Grindcrusher (compilation album, (Earache Records, 1990)
- Human Error CD Reissue (with bonus tracks), 2001
- Grind Madness at the BBC (3 CD Compilation), 2010
