= Crime Watch Daily =

American syndicated television program

- Also known as: Crime Watch Daily with Chris Hansen
- Genre: Investigative newsmagazine
- Created by: Lisa Gregorisch-Dempsey
- Presented by: Matt Doran; Chris Hansen
- Theme music composer: Masoud Fouladi Moghaddam
- Composer: Jason Brandt
- Country of origin: United States
- Original language: English
- No. of seasons: 3
- No. of episodes: 580

Production
- Executive producers: Jeremy Spiegel; Scott Eldridge
- Production locations: Build Studios; New York City
- Editors: David Milhous; Jim Robinson; Chris Jolissaint
- Camera setup: Multi-camera
- Running time: 44 minutes
- Production companies: Lisa G. Productions; Telepictures

Original release
- Network: Syndication
- Release: September 14, 2015 – June 8, 2018

Related
- To Catch a Predator

Crime Watch Daily (later retitled as Crime Watch Daily with Chris Hansen from season 2 onwards) is an American syndicated investigative news magazine television program. Premiering on September 14, 2015, the program was originally hosted by veteran Australian television journalist Matt Doran. The remaining two seasons were hosted by former NBC News investigative reporter Chris Hansen.

Produced by Telepictures and distributed by WBTVS Unscripted Production, Crime Watch Daily features a mix of investigative reports, true crime stories and caught-on-tape police and security footage. The show was cancelled on June 8, 2018, though the website and social media components remain fully active under the new title of True Crime Daily (now known as True Crime News). Reruns of the second and third seasons of the series began airing in February 2019 on what is now Ion Mystery.

== Format ==
The program showcases current and ongoing crime stories (including those surrounding unsolved murder and missing persons cases) and feature reports on undercover investigations from across the United States and around the world as well as limited coverage of ongoing court cases. As an example of such investigation segments, during the Crime Watch Daily's first week of episodes, the program showcased an undercover investigation into how Uber screens those applying for positions as drivers before being authorized and hired, revealing that the three applicants mentioned in the piece were convicted felons, who were cleared after their background checks were completed.

Franchise features fill the final three segments of each episode, which deal with other criminal cases and arrests, both of a serious and unusual nature:

- Crime Watch Local – originally titled "APB" (in reference to the abbreviation for "all points bulletin"), it is a daily segment highlighting in-depth a particular criminal case or mystery covered by one of the program's affiliate stations, followed by an interview with a reporter from the station to provide additional information on the story;
- Daily Watch List – a segment, seen in most episodes, which highlights various top crime stories from around the United States;
- Bad Seed of the Day – a weekly segment profiling a particular criminal and the crime they committed;
- Crime Watch Daily Heat Map – usually serving as the penultimate segment of each edition, it is a blotter-style segment – which includes mugshots of the acts' perpetrators – consisting of a selection of unusual crime stories from around the U.S. that are tied to a particular theme;
- Wild About Trial – Crime Watch Daily maintains a partnership with the trial-focused news website, whose founder Alison Triessl serves as a contributor for a weekly segment (usually seen on Tuesdays) highlighting ongoing criminal cases being covered by the site;
- CrimeTube – a daily segment that concludes most episodes, featuring videos of criminal acts, sting operations, police pursuits and footage of law enforcement activity culled from public domain security camera, traffic camera, and police dashcam footage.

Telepictures had previously produced a syndicated program with a similar format, Celebrity Justice, from which most of the staff and format of the TMZ online and television entertainment news platform arose out of; however, that program – which ran from 2002 to 2005 – focused more on celebrity legal issues than the reality/true crime focus which Crime Watch Daily is based around (though some notable non-celebrity true crime cases were covered on Celebrity Justice).

== Production and distribution ==
On September 15, 2014, Warner Bros. Television Distribution announced that it would order Crime Watch Daily for the 2015–16 season, with Tribune Broadcasting carrying the program on stations owned and/or operated by the group in 29 markets – covering 42% of the United States (including its three largest, CW affiliates WPIX/New York City, KTLA/Los Angeles and independent WGN-TV/Chicago) – most of which would air the program as a lead-in to their early-evening newscasts (Crime Watch Daily also aired on Tribune-run stations that either did not air any local news programming, or outsource news production to a co-owned or another local station). Through the distribution agreement with Tribune, the group also struck a news sharing partnership with the program to provide video content of crime stories filed by its news-producing stations.

Through the spring of 2015, Warner Bros. expanded clearance of the program through distribution deals with other station groups (including CBS Television Stations, Media General, Cox Media Group, Graham Media Group, Raycom Media, Sinclair Broadcast Group and the Meredith Corporation), gaining carriage on stations covering 98% of the country. Through the Tribune agreement and subsequent group distribution deals, Crime Watch Daily expanded its content partnerships to provide video from crime-related stories filed by the program's affiliate stations, serving as an "extended newsroom", with reporters employed with stations that air the program contributing to the "APB/Crime Watch Local" segment to provide additional details on the segment's featured story.

On May 5, 2015, Warner Bros. Television announced that Australian journalist Matt Doran (formerly an anchor/reporter for Network Ten and host of the similarly formatted newsmagazine Wanted) would serve as anchor of the program, with Michelle Sigona (former correspondent of America's Most Wanted and 48 Hours), Andrea Isom (formerly a crime reporter for Fox owned-and-operated station WJBK in Detroit) and Jason Mattera serving as reporters.

Despite the show's primary focus and title, Crime Watch Daily is designated as a news program by the Federal Communications Commission (FCC) by way of a ruling made by the agency on August 11, 2015, through a declaratory ruling sought by GHN Productions; because of the ruling, the program therefore is exempt from FCC requirements that would have obligated it to provide airtime to political candidates featured in coverage of trials, criminal cases and other "crime-related" matters.

The program's premiere episode on September 14, 2015 earned a 0.9 rating/2 share in 53 Nielsen-metered markets, with its strongest viewership in Kansas City (where it airs on Fox affiliate WDAF-TV), scoring a 3.2/10 in that market. For the week of September 14, Crime Watch Daily earned a 0.8 rating/2 share in all metered markets for its primary runs (resulting in year-over-year ratings increases in several markets, and performing strongest in St. Louis – on Fox affiliate KTVI – where it scored a 2.5/8, a 32% increase in its timeslot over the same period in September 2014).

On August 22, 2016, it was announced that veteran journalist and former NBC News correspondent Chris Hansen, best known for his recurring Dateline series To Catch a Predator, would become the new host of Crime Watch Daily for its second season. Hansen anchored the program from New York City, but maintained its Los Angeles-based newsroom. The second season also saw the premiere of Hansen vs. Predator, a revival of his previous To Catch a Predator series. Hansen's entry brought further ratings gains to the program, with household ratings increasing by 20% to 1.0, and a 23% gain among women 18–34. On January 4, 2017, Crime Watch Daily was renewed for a third season. In 2017, the series was nominated for a Daytime Emmy Award for Outstanding Special Class Series.

At the 2018 NATPE convention, the Tribune and Sinclair stations airing Crime Watch Daily picked up the rerun package of True Crime Files from Investigation Discovery for their lineups. This move resulted in the loss of Crime Watch Daily's major market clearances, as the stations were intent on replacing it with their new acquisition. Facing a continued ratings struggle, Telepictures and Warner Bros. ceased production of Crime Watch Daily at the end of the season with its final new episode airing on June 8, 2018.

== Second life as web-only True Crime Daily ==
On September 20, 2018, the show's website returned, this time under the new domain and website name of True Crime Daily, continuing to use their resources (scaled down for a web operation) and those of their former stations to report current true crime news in a web-only form.

== Revival ==
In July 2024, Warner Bros. and Telepictures announced that they would be bringing True Crime Daily back to television. The show (and website) took the name True Crime News and hosted by newscaster Ana Garcia, the host of the True Crime Daily podcast and a correspondent for the original Crime Watch Daily television series. The show debuted on September 9, 2024.

In March 2025, it was announced the series was cancelled after one season due to low ratings.
