= Lippy's Garden =

- Origin: Glendora, California, United States
- Genres: Post punk
- Years active: 1984–1987
- Past members: Mark Bollinger; James Ross; Rob Salter; David Milhous

Lippy's Garden was a post-punk band formed in 1984 in Glendora, California. The band consisted of David Milhous (drums and background vocals), his cousin Mark Bollinger (vocals and lead guitar), James Ross (keyboards), and Rob Salter (bass). The four were nicknamed "Corn", "Milo", "Stuart", and "Raw", respectively. Their album "The Etiquette and Economics of Escape" was produced and recorded during the summer of 1985 at Loyola Marymount University by the son of legendary live television producer Marty Pasetta. Marty produced hundreds of hours of television including Aloha from Hawaii Via Satellite.

The band's sound incorporated funk, punk, and new wave. Their debut album was first played on local Los Angeles radio stations, including KLOS and KROQ-FM—the band got an early break by knocking on the studio door at KROQ-FM and handing a demo tape to independent DJ Rodney Bingenheimer. The group performed at almost every major club in Los Angeles county before disbanding in 1987.
