= Paul "Hammy" Halmshaw =

British musician

Paul Halmshaw also known as "Hammy" (born 1965) is a British musician who founded Peaceville Records, which signed some of the most infamous death, black, and doom metal and crust punk bands worldwide in the late 1980s and throughout the 1990s.

He was raised in Dewsbury, West Yorkshire, England, where he began playing drums at school and became a 'punk rocker'. He formed the band Instigators with his school friend Simon Mooney (guitar). After Simon Bridgewater (vocals) and Simon Elsey (bass) joined they made some demo recordings at Lion Studios in Leeds. These collected demos became the first release on Hammy's then cassette only label, Peaceville Tapes in 1983.

As the tape label became successful it became obvious that a move into vinyl releasing was the next logical step and following his departure from the Instigators in 1985 he worked on making the label a profession, inaugurating the record label proper on 27 December 1986.

In 1987 he released a four-track 7" flexi-disc single, entitled "Will Evil Win?", followed by hard vinyl 7" singles by Deviated Instinct and Atavistic.

In 1988 he released the first album on the label, a compilation called A Vile Peace featuring Chumbawamba, Sore Throat (whom he joined as drummer from 1988 to 1990), Axegrinder, Electro Hippies, Doom, Deviated Instinct, Hellbastard, and many more. Expanding the label into a full-time operation, he continued to release albums by Electro Hippies, Deviated Instinct, and Doom. He then ventured into metal for the first time with Toranaga. As the label grew, he signed more professional acts like Autopsy, Paradise Lost, My Dying Bride, Anathema, Darkthrone, At the Gates, Vital Remains, and many others throughout the early 1990s.

Coincidentally, he also ran Vile Music, which from 1988 onwards was a music publishing company and held the rights to the releases of every band signed to Peaceville. Eventually, in 1997, the publishing was spun out of the label as a separate entity and signed to Zomba for worldwide administration.

Hammy continued to run both Peaceville Records and Vile Music Publishing until 2006, when he sold his holding in the record label to concentrate solely on the publishing company.

In December 2016, to coincide with the 30th anniversary of the founding of the record label proper, he released his memoirs, entitled Peaceville Life. This was released through his 'Hell Segundo' imprint which was launched at the same time. In August 2019 it was reissued by UK publishing house Cult Never Dies

As of March 2021, Paul was diagnosed with hereditary dilated cardiomyopathy.
