= David Milhous =

American film and television editor

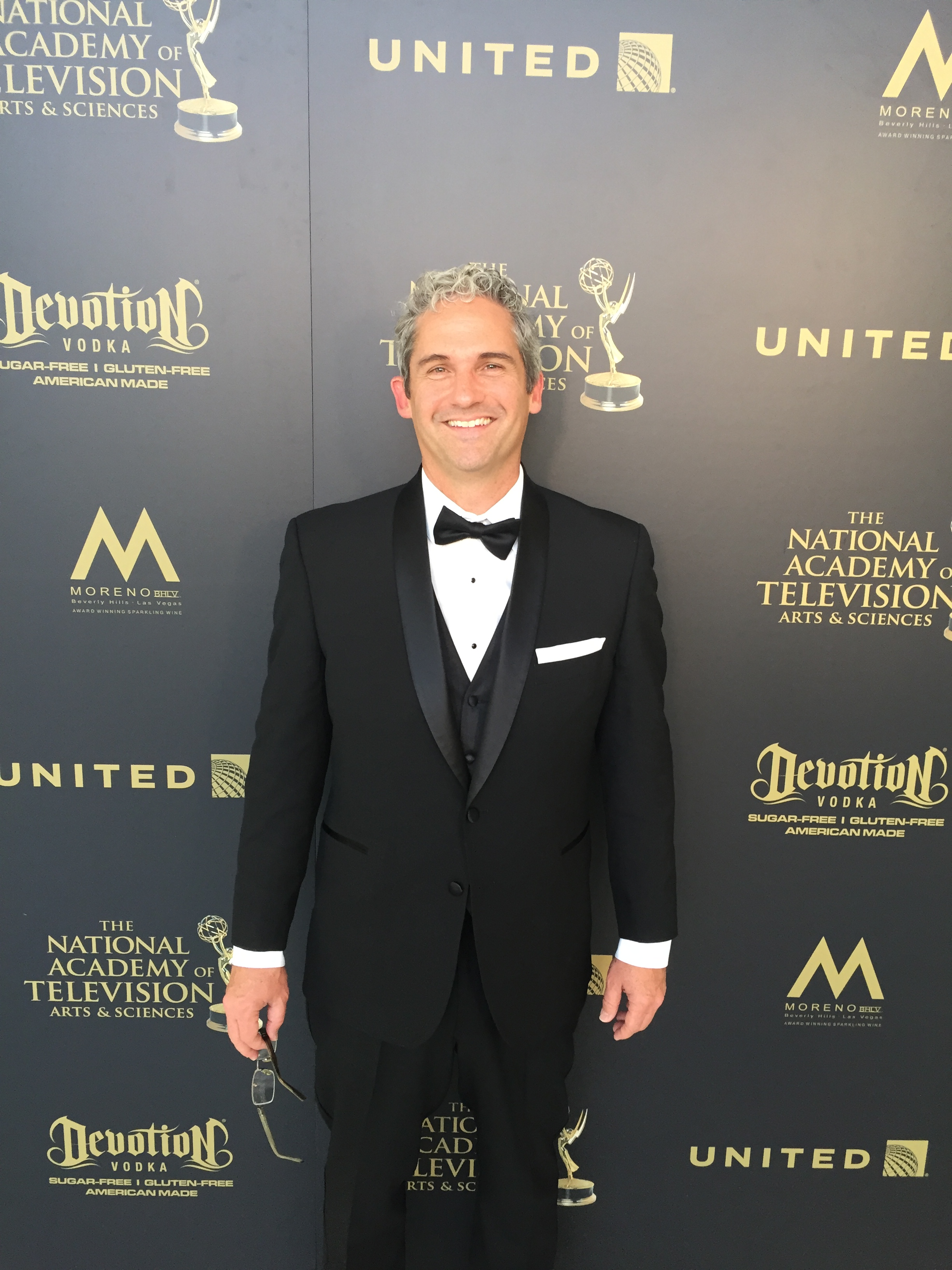
- Milhous in 2017
- Born: Glendora, California, U.S.
- Education: New York University (BFA); American Film Institute (MFA)
- Occupation: Film editor

David Milhous is an American film editor. He is known best as the editor of Crime Watch Daily, which won an Emmy Award for Editing in 2017. He is also a founding member of the American post-punk band Lippy's Garden.

Milhous spent several years editing news at CNN in Atlanta before turning to dramatic long-form storytelling at Paramount Pictures and Warner Brothers Entertainment in Hollywood. His work as an editor has aired on CW, CBS, CNBC, NBC, ABC, CNN, Facebook Watch, Fox Broadcasting Company, Netflix, HGTV, Discovery, BBC, Five (UK), Virgin1, MTV, MTV2, History Channel, The Learning Channel, Biography, Animal Planet, Spike TV, UPN, A&E, CNN International, IFC, Lifetime, Oxygen, The Africa Channel, The Travel Channel, and The Science Channel.

Milhous cites Alfred Hitchcock, Philip Glass and Henri Cartier-Bresson as his creative influences. He is a lifetime member of the American Film Institute and a member of the Academy of Television Arts & Sciences and American Cinema Editors (ACE). Milhous was elected to membership in the American Cinema Editors (ACE) and has helped shape the curriculum for the first master's degree program in the field of Editing at the New York Film Academy at Universal Studios.

== Education ==
- AFI Conservatory, (MFA) Film Editing
- New York University, (BFA) Tisch School of the Arts, Film and Television Production
- Attended the University of Southern California, where he was the Assistant Chief Photographer for the Daily Trojan.

== Awards ==
Nominated - Daytime Emmy Award, Multi-Camera Editing, Crime Watch Daily, 2018.

Winner - Daytime Emmy Award, Multi-Camera Editing, Crime Watch Daily, 2017.

Nominated - American Cinema Editors, ACE Eddie Award, AFI, 2001.
