= Heresy (band) =

English hardcore punk band

- Origin: Nottingham, England
- Genres: Hardcore punk; grindcore; thrashcore
- Years active: 1985–1989
- Labels: Earache, In Your Face, Lost & Found, Boss Tuneage
- Members: Malcolm "Reevsy" Reeves; Kalvin Piper; Steve Charlesworth; John March; Mitch Dickinson; Stephen "Baz" Ballam

Heresy were a hardcore punk band from Nottingham, England, formed in 1985 and active until late 1989. They released three albums and recorded three sessions for John Peel's BBC Radio 1 show.

== History ==
The band was formed by Reevsy (guitar, vocals), Kalvin "Kalv" Piper (bass), and Steve Charlesworth (drums), the first two having previously been in the Stoke-on-Trent band Plasmid. Their first release was the 1986 6-track flexi-disc Never Healed - the first release on Earache Records, which was followed by a split LP with Concrete Sox. They then added a singer, who was soon replaced by Concrete Sox drummer John March. Reevsy left the band to be replaced by Mitch Dickinson from Unseen Terror on guitar. The band toured through Europe with this line-up.

In 1988, Mitch left the band, to be replaced by Baz from Ripcord, the new line-up recording the Face Up to It LP. The band's final album, 1989's 13 Rocking Anthems, was compiled from their last two Peel Sessions. The band split up in late 1988. Members Steve and Kalv formed Meatfly, and now play in UK hardcore band Geriatric Unit.

== Musical style ==
Heresy's early material merged influences from English hardcore punk groups like Discharge and American extreme metal bands like Metallica and Slayer. A fusion which led to them being categorised as crust punk. By the time their founding vocalist Malcolm Reeves was replaced by Kalvin Piper, they had stripped away the metal influence, for a thrashcore sound influenced by Boston hardcore, early-Dirty Rotten Imbeciles and Siege. An article for Alternative Press described how "no band before them, harnessed the hormonal force of American hardcore and spiked it with metal-tipped UK82 punk". Simon Czerwinskyj, in an article for Bandcamp Daily, described the band as "proto-grind crust maniacs".

== Discography ==
=== Singles/EPs ===
- Never Healed flexi EP (1986) Earache
- Thanks! 7" (1987)
- Whose Generation? 7" (1989) In Your Face
- Live at Leeds 7" (1990) Open

=== Albums ===
- Heresy/Concrete Sox split LP (1987) Earache
- Face Up To It LP (1988) In Your Face (UK Indie No. 13)
- 13 Rocking Anthems LP (1989) In Your Face
- Never Slit Thanks CD (1990) Earache/Toys Factory (compilation)
- Voice Your Opinion (1992) Lost & Found
- Visions Of Fear (1992) Lost & Found
- ``Voice Of Fear``(199?) Lost & Found
- 1985-87 (2006) Boss Tuneage
- 20 Reasons To End It All (2007) Boss Tuneage

=== DVD ===
- 1987 Excerpts From 4 Live Shows (2006) Boss Tuneage

=== Compilations featuring Heresy ===
- Grindcrusher LP (Earache)
- Metal a headbangers companion LP (Earache)
