= Cerebral Fix =

English thrash metal band

- Origin: Birmingham, England
- Genres: Thrash metal; crossover thrash
- Years active: 1986–1993, 2006–2009, 2013–2017
- Labels: Vinyl Solution; Roadrunner; Music For Nations; Xtreem
- Members: Neil Hadden; Gregg Fellows; Tony Warburton; Nigel Joiner; Andy Baker
- Past members: Paul Adams; Kevin Frost; Adrian Jones; Steve Watson; Scott Fairfax; Frank Healy; Simon Forrest; Al Osta; Neil Farrington

Cerebral Fix are an English thrash metal band formed in Birmingham in 1986. They became members of the UK thrash metal and death metal scenes through four albums, three of which were on major labels before finally disbanding in 1993. In 2006, the band announced its reformation. Drummer Neil Farrington died in the early hours of 20 December 2009. They would reform in 2013 and record a fifth album released in 2016, before disbanding once more in 2017.

== Band members ==
=== Final lineup ===
- Neil Hadden – vocals (2016–2017)
- Gregg Fellows – guitar (1986–1993, 2006–2009, 2013–2017)
- Tony Warburton – guitar (1986–1993, 2006–2009, 2013–2017)
- Nigel Joiner – bass (2016–2017)
- Andy Baker – drums (1989–1991, 2013–2017)

=== Past members ===
- Simon Forrest – vocals (1986–1993, 2006–2009, 2013–2014)
- Al Osta – vocals (2014–2016)
- Paul Adams – bass (1986–1987)
- Steve Watson – bass (1987–1989, 2013–2016)
- Frank Healy – bass (1989–1993)
- Scott Fairfax – bass (2006–2009)
- Adrian Jones – drums (1986–1989)
- Kev Frost – drums (1992–1993)
- Neil Farrington – drums (2006–2009; his death)

=== Session members ===
- Chris 'Doss' Hatton – guitar (2016)

Timeline

== Discography ==
- We Need Therapy (1987) Demo
- Product of Disgust (1987) Demo
- Life Sucks... And Then You Die! (1988) Vinyl Solution
- Tower of Spite (1990) Demo
- Tower of Spite (1990) Roadrunner Records
- Bastards (1991) Roadrunner Records
- Death Erotica (1992) Music For Nations/Under One Flag
- Disaster of Reality (2016) Xtreem Music
