= Frank Healy =

- Frank Healy performing with Memoriam in 2022.

Background information
- Born: 30 August 1962 (age 64); Handsworth, Birmingham, England
- Genres: Death metal; doom metal
- Instruments: Bass; guitar

Healy in 2018

Francis "Frank" Healy (born 30 August 1962) is an English musician, he is a former guitarist of Napalm Death. Healy also was the bass player for Cerebral Fix. He also played bass in the first live Anaal Nathrakh session for the John Peel show. He was the bassist in the band Benediction from 1991 until 2017. He's currently in Sacrilege since 2014 as well as in Memoriam since 2016.

Healy played guitar with Napalm Death in 1987, following the departure of Justin Broadrick, on a trial period, he was succeeded by Bill Steer after the band had a reshuffle following the departure of frontman Nic Bullen.
