= Stream from the Heavens =

Studio album by Thergothon
- Released: June 15, 1994
- Recorded: October to November 1992
- Genre: Funeral doom
- Length: 40:48
- Label: Avantgarde Music
- Producer: Thergothon

Thergothon chronology
Fhtagn nagh Yog-Sothoth (Demo) (1991)	Stream from the Heavens (1994)

Stream from the Heavens is the only studio album by Finnish doom metal band Thergothon. It was recorded in late 1992 and released after many delays on June 15, 1994 through the Italian record label Avantgarde Music. The band had eventually disbanded a year before the release of the album. Stream from the Heavens continues the funeral doom subgenre that Thergothon pioneered with their 1991 demo Fhtagn nagh Yog-Sothoth. The album was re-issued on CD in 1999 and also in 2004 by Belgian label Painiac as a 12" LP, limited to 500 copies.

== Background ==
According to the album notes, the band started to compose songs between 1990 and the end of the recordings, which took place from October to November 1992. In an interview, singer and keyboard player Niko Sirkiä says that he only wrote the documented lyrics on the legend of Kthulu.

After having recorded the demo Fhtagn nagh Yog-Sothoth, the band reworked on two songs from this demo and recorded two others during the fall of 1992. The sound of the album is characterized by non-metal influences such as gothic rock, dark ambient and progressive rock and, compared to Fhtagn nagh Yog-Sothoth, extreme slowness, an impression confirmed by Sirkiä, who, questioned on the influences of Thergothon which led to the sound of the album, named the following inspirations:

"Probably either the Doors or Black Sabbath. Or the gothic punk bands that fascinated us at the time. That's what inspired us, not the millions of death metal bands that existed."

In addition to Paradise Lost and Cathedral, Sirkiä refers to pioneers of their own development, but the musicians did not go far enough, especially with the slow tempos. In retrospect, however, more important than musical influence seemed to him to be the search for means of expressing one of mine considered universal as an existential fear at the end of adolescence. He described music as "an appropriate means of expressing and expelling the negative emotions that [the band members] experienced." The lyrics also constantly refer to H.P. Lovecraft. However, Sirkiä described the atmosphere as the central objective of the band's music. All other aspects are only intended to support the desired atmosphere. Despite the completion of the recording process and the complete graphic design of the album without any difficulty, it has not been released for a long time. Some describe problems with the contractual partner as the cause of the long-term delay. After finishing the recordings and before the album was released, the group decided to disband. Sirkiä describes the dissolution as a consequence of the impression that he had completed the project. He also recalled the fact that they had become more and more tired of playing metal.

== Artwork ==
The design of the album and booklets were done by Niko Sirkiä himself. K. Sirkiä is listed as the photographer of the cover picture, a low-lying sunrise with a barely identifiable tower monolithically protruding into the right picture space. The image was given an "ominous" appearance by Oscar Strik for the review written for the Webzine Doom-Metal.com. In addition to the information on the recording, the lyrics in the booklet were printed in a calligraphic font in white on a black background.

== Release ==
The album was released on June 15, 1994, via Italian independent label Avantgarde Music, and was reissued by black metal label Obscure Plasma Records, as the first release under the new label name. It contains six songs with a total playing time of 40 minutes and 48 seconds. No changes were made to the volume of the album in later editions and additional bonus material was not added.

== Legacy ==
Upon its first release, Stream from the Heavens was highly neglected by the professional music press. With time however, it became noticed by the international metal scene. In 2014, Decibel Magazine ranked the album ninth on the 100 Top Doom Metal Albums of All Time. In that same year, Deaf Forever, ranked it at number 34 on the list of the 50 Best Doom Albums of All Time and as part of the list 20 Essential Black / Death Doom Albums. The album is also listed in various similar lists. British magazine Metal Hammer mentioned Stream from the Heavens among The 10 Essential Doom Metal Albums, while Loudwire listed it on The Best Metal Albums From 40 Subgenres and at number 6 of the Top 25 Doom Metal Albums of All Time.

In his work for the British magazine Metal Hammer, Christ Chantler placed the album in terms of their importance for the development of doom metal and the genre that follows it in relation to Winter, Eyehategod, Disembowelment and Unholy. He declared that no other band has created more terrifying "than the non-Euclidean geometry of the Finnish pioneer band Thergothon, whose only album is an ice age Lovecraftian nightmare that still exudes its distant mysticism." In the weekly series Funeral Friday, which was written for the Webzine Metal Injection, journalist Cody Davis presented Thergothon as the starting point of the genre.

According to such assessments, reviewers described the album as original and comparative work for releases in the genre that are currently to be discussed. Accordingly, bands like Rigor Sardonicous, Mournful Congregation, Profetus, Beneath Oblivion, Woebegone Obscured, Ea, and Funeral Moth have released albums which have been compared to Stream from the Heavens.

Performers and musicians such as Kostas Panagiotou of Pantheist, Nathan Guerrette of Great Cold Emptiness, Nortt, Sacha Dunable of Bereft, Jonathan Théry of Funeralium and Ataraxie, John del Russi of Hierophant and Catacombs and Nick Orlando of Evoken cited the album as an inspiration for their own music.

== Track listing ==
All music is composed by Thergothon.

No.	Title	Length
1.	"Everlasting"	6:07
2.	"Yet the Watchers Guard"	8:56
3.	"The Unknown Kadath in the Cold Waste"	3:49
4.	"Elemental"	9:18
5.	"Who Rides the Astral Wings"	7:56
6.	"Crying Blood + Crimson Snow"	4:42
Total length:		40:48

== Credits ==
- Niko "Skorpio" Sirkiä – vocals, keyboards
- Mikko Ruotsalainen – guitars
- Jori Sjöroos – drums, vocals

=== Production ===
- Produced by Thergothon
- Recorded, engineered, mixed & mastered by Markus Patrikainen
