= Metamorphogenesis =

Studio album by Esoteric
- Released: August 1999
- Recorded: 1999
- Genre: Doom metal; funeral doom
- Length: 44:15
- Label: Eibon Records
- Producer: Esoteric

Esoteric chronology
The Pernicious Enigma (1997)	Metamorphogenesis (1999)	Subconscious Dissolution into the Continuum (2004)

Professional ratings
Review scores
Source	Rating
Allmusic	link
Sonic Perspectives	9.5/10 link

Metamorphogenesis is the third studio album by the British doom metal band Esoteric. It was released in August 1999 through Eibon records.

== Track listing ==
No.	Title	Length
1.	"Dissident"	17:17
2.	"The Secret of the Secret"	15:11
3.	"Psychotropic Transgression"	11:47
Total length:		44:15

== Credits ==
- Bryan Beck -- Bass guitar
- Gordon Bicknell -- Guitar
- Greg Chandler -- vocals, guitar
- Steve Peters -- Guitar
- Keith York -- drums
- Guest vocals on "The Secret of the Secret" by Tom Kvalsvoll
