= Desolate North =

Studio album by Celestiial
- Released: June 6, 2006
- Recorded: 2004–05, United States
- Genre: Funeral doom metal
- Length: 44:05
- Label: Bindrune Recordings
- Producer: Tanner Anderson

Celestiial chronology
Ashen (2004)	Desolate North (2006)	Celestiial / Blood of the Black Owl (2008)

Desolate North is the debut studio album by the funeral doom metal band Celestiial, first released by Bindrune Recordings on June 6, 2006. It comprises the five tracks from Celestiial's demo, Ashen, combined with three more tracks recorded separately. It was written, performed and recorded entirely by Tanner Anderson, the member of Celestiial, and was never written to be an album or to be performed. The Bindrune CD release is out-of-print, but Desolate North is still available digitally and in LP-format, the latter having been released by music distributor Handmade Birds in 2011.

The album received mixed reviews—some critics claimed it was fresh and a new sound, while others argued it was very similar to music already available. Desolate North has an extremely slow rhythm and has only limited vocals. The music is interspersed with various woodland sounds, such as running water and footsteps. The natural imagery used on the album is reminiscent of that used in black metal, but the music is closer to ambient.

== Recording ==
The album was recorded in three parts. First, Anderson recorded the music for Ashen. This was done in a wooden loft in the corner of the rehearsal space used by Azrael, of whom Anderson was, at the time, a member. Anderson has said that he does not remember how long this recording took him, as he slept there after finishing the work. He described that space as perfect for the recording, as there was nothing there to distract him.

As the entire album was recorded and played by Anderson, the only option was to record the music in layers. First, he recorded the drums, using a drum kit. However, he was unhappy with the way they sounded, and so re-recorded on a drum machine. The next layers to be recorded were the guitar, bass and vocals, with other sounds being added later.

The other three songs on Desolate North one was recorded at the same place in early 2005, and the other two, the harp pieces, were recorded at Anderson's home. He has said how this was the most difficult part of the recording. As it happened, Anderson misplaced his microphone stand and so recorded those two songs with the microphone tucked under his chin. Despite the hindrance, Anderson claimed that the microphone picked up everything, and he was happy with the result.

Anderson has described the process as giving the album a "raw" sound, and he has hypothesized that it is because of the raw sound of the album that critics have described his work as having influences from black metal. Although the album's production was criticised by Ignacio Coluccio of Maelstrom, Kim Kelly, of Pivotal Alliance, praised the album for its high quality recording, explaining that it "is not raw, necro black metal at all".

== Release ==
A small number of copies of Ashen were sent to various people. Marty Rytkonen, of Bindrune Recordings, was the only person attached to a record label to receive one, and Celestiial was then taken on by Bindrune. Anderson was very happy with this, as he had been an avid reader of Worm Gear (a magazine attached to the label) when he was younger. Despite the fact that Anderson had not written Desolate North with the intention of it ever being released, in 2006, it was released by Bindrune Recordings. The CD version released by Bindrune Recordings is now out of print. However, in 2011, the album was rereleased in vinyl LP format by Handmade Birds, and the album remains available in digital format.

== Musical style ==
Desolate North has been described as taking "the template of the funeral doom genre... and disembowel[ing] the formula even further". The album makes use of minimal vocals, instead relying on electronics, guitars, and syncopated drums (with liberal use of cymbals). These sounds are also backed up by more traditional instruments, such as harps and Native American flutes. Additionally, sampled sounds—including footsteps, water, birdsong and wind—are used.

Celestiial is a funeral doom metal band. However, Desolate North has been described as taking the genre in new directions with comparisons to ambient, goth, experimental, and dark folk music being made. The music has also been described as meditative and medieval.

Anderson admits that there may be death metal influences in the vocals, but says that it was not a conscious design, and that the music does not have any other similarities to death metal. He claims that there are no black metal influences. He says that describing Celestiial's music as folk is a bad idea, as folk is such a broad, vague description as to make it meaningless. He says that what he is creating is neither folk, nor traditional, and even the harp songs are not traditional works, though they are influenced by the traditional music of the United Kingdom and traditional Irish music.

== Imagery ==
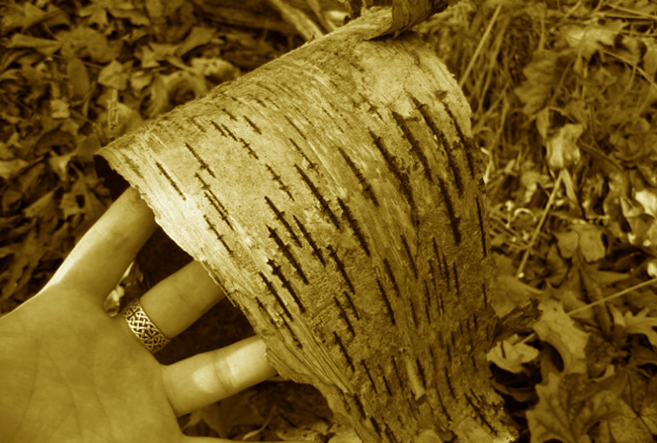
A publicity photo used by the band. It shows Anderson holding a piece of bark, demonstrating the band's heavy use of natural imagery.

Desolate North uses imagery very much based around nature, with natural sounds sampled in the music, and imagery involving woodland, and, as one reviewer put it, "the scary places that we all fear when the lights are out". Bindrune recordings describes this affinity for nature by saying that "Celestiial was created to mirror mysticism in nature."

Brandon Stosuy, of Pitchfork Media, talked of a black metal influence in the album's imagery. Anderson responded to the claim of black metal influence by stating that he does not know why people compare his music to black metal; he hypothesized that it is simply the raw production of the music, or the double 'i' in the band name.

Anderson was once asked about whether there were any pagan beliefs in Celestiial. He responded that Celestiial "is romanticized Paganism with very real Pagan values behind it". He talked of how Celestiial celebrated paganism and the natural world, but that paganism is often viewed as something that it is not.

== Reception ==
Professional ratings
Review scores
Source	Rating
AllMusic	2/5 stars
Decibel Magazine	Positive
Sea of Tranquility	4/5 stars
Maelstrom	2.95/10 stars
Stylus Magazine	Negative

Desolate North received mixed reviews. The album garnered positive reviews from a number of ezines, with comparisons to founders of the genre, such as Disembowelment. AllMusic reviewer Eduardo Rivadavia, however, felt that Desolate North compared negatively with the efforts of more prominent bands, concluding that "Celestiial could be a hell of a lot worse, but they could be much better, too." Scott Seward of Decibel Magazine felt that the music compared well to similar bands, said that Anderson "makes beautiful sounds out of the darkness that others would rather run from".

Reviewers disagreed on the originality of the music—while Seward claimed that it was new and inventive, Murat Batmaz, of Maelstrom, said that it was very typical funeral doom metal. Negative reviews and comments talked about the poor production and guitars, and the lack of speed in the music, combined with the monotony of the sound. Seward felt that the album "is not 'heavy' music in the least, if we’re talking volume and crunch", but that "it is 'heavy' music if we’re talking about the end product: a deep and pervasively creepy atmosphere that is compelling in its use of silence and hushed reverence for the forest floor".

== Track listing ==
All tracks are written by Tanner Anderson.

Desolate North track listing
No.	Title	Length
1.	"Into this Earth of Shallow Intent"	2:00
2.	"Haunting Cries Beneath the Lake Where Our Queen Once Walked"	8:56
3.	"Lamentations in the Citadel of God"	10:48
4.	"Desolate North"	2:47
5.	"Thule"	8:08
6.	"Hinterland"	2:16
7.	"Waldlander im Herbst"	8:59
8.	"Ashen"	2:11
