= Wyrd (band) =

- Origin: Hyvinkää, Finland
- Genres: Black metal, folk metal, doom metal, ambient
- Years active: 1998–present
- Label: Dragonthrone (2000–2001) Millenium (2001–2002) Desolate Landscapes (2003) Solistitium (2003–2004) Omvina (2005–2006) Sabbaths Fire (2006) Winterreich (2007) Northern Silence (2007) Avantgarde (2007) Kreation (2008–2009) Naga (2009) Moribund (since 2010)

Wyrd is a Finnish Pagan black metal band which was formed in 1998. The band was originally formed under the name Hellkult in 1997 by Narqath and drummer Kalma (ex- Azaghal). The first Wyrd demo was released in early 2000, "Unchained Heathen Wrath" featured material recorded between 1998 and 2000. The lyrical themes are centered on old folklore and Nordic mythology. The name "Wyrd" is from Old English, meaning fate.

== Current members ==
- Narqath (Tomi Kalliola) - vocals, all non-percussion instruments (Azaghal), ex-Calm (Fin), ex-Decay's Delight, Finnugor, ex-Hin Onde, ex-Necromortum, ex-Oath of Cirion, ex-Svartalfheim (Fin), Svartkraft, ex-Thoronath, ex-Valar, Vultyr, Weltraum, With Hate I Burn, Hellkult)
- JL Nokturnal - drums, percussion (ex-Hin Onde, Medieval Art, Nocturnal Winds, Yearning, Svartkraft, Azaghal)

== Discography ==
=== Studio albums ===
- 2001: Heathen
- 2002: Huldrafolk
- 2003: Vargtimmen Pt. 1: The Inmost Night
- 2004: Vargtimmen Pt. 2: Ominous Insomnia
- 2005: Rota
- 2006: The Ghost Album
- 2007: Kammen
- 2009: Kalivägi
- 2016: Death Of The Sun

=== Demos, EPs and splits ===
- 2000: Unchained Heathen Wrath (Demo)
- 2000: Songs of the Northern Gale (Demo)
- 2001: Of Revenge and Bloodstained Swords (Demo)
- 2006: Tuonela (EP)
- 2007: Wyrd / Häive / Kehrä (Split)

=== Compilations ===
- 2003: Wrath & Revenge
