= Celestiial =

American funeral doom metal band

- Origin: Minnesota, United States
- Genres: Funeral doom metal
- Years active: 2004 — present
- Label: Bindrune
- Members: Tanner Reed Anderson; Jason William Walton; Timothy Glenn
- Website: Bindrune Recordings: Celestiial

Celestiial is a funeral doom metal band from Minnesota. Initially consisting only of Tanner R. Anderson (vocals, harp, guitars), the band was later joined by Jason William Walton (bass) and Timothy Glenn (percussion). Celestiial is known for using numerous instruments in its music, combining traditional folk instruments with those more typically used in metal music, as well as sampling the sounds of the natural world. Celestiial's music is intended to evoke images of the natural world.

After producing a demo, Ashen (2004), Celestiial was signed to Bindrune Recordings. Through Bindrune, Celestiial released Desolate North (2006, rereleased by Handmade Birds in 2011) and Where Life Springs Eternal (2010), as well as a split album, Celestiial / Blood of the Black Owl (2008).

== History ==
=== Celestiial ===
Marty Rytkonen, of Bindrune Recordings, was one of the "maybe six or so" people to receive a copy of Celestiial's demo Ashen, but he was the only person associated with a label. He and Scott Candey agreed to take on the band, and in 2006, Desolate North was released by Bindrune Recordings. However, the album had not been recorded in a studio. Five of the songs — the five that composed Ashen — had been recorded one evening in the corner of the Azrael rehearsal space, and the three additional songs on Desolate North were recorded later. One of them was in early 2005, and was recorded in the same place as the first five, but the other two, the songs featuring the harps, were recorded at Anderson's home, with his microphone literally tucked under his chin. Desolate North received generally positive reviews, along with comparisons to bands such as Disembowelment. However, a number of critics viewed it negatively.

In early 2006, following the release of Desolate North, Tim Glenn joined the band as a drummer. In 2008, Jason Walton joined the band on bass and the line-up has remained the same to the current day. Bindrune is due to release Celestiial's second album in summer 2007. By comparison, it is due to be recorded in a studio, which Anderson feels will give it a different sound. Also, the album will be produced with the intention of producing an album, something that was never the case with Desolate North.

Celestiial's music was used by Ballet Deviare in their performance Forged in January 2007. In this, tracks by Celestiial was used alongside pieces by Arsis, Gwybleidd, Opeth, My Dying Bride, Swallow the Sun and Japanische Kampfhörspiele as backing tracks to the dancing. The music was also used on May 24, 25 and 26, 2008 as part of the newest Ballet Deviare production, Memento Mori. Ballet Deviare's performances to Celestiial's music have also appeared on the MTV Two show Headbangers Ball.

In 2008, it was announced that Celestiial was releasing a split album with Blood of the Black Owl on Bindrune Recordings. The final mastering was done by Mel Detmer, and the release (titled only as Celestiial / Blood of the Black Owl Split 12"LP) is limited to only 500 copies. Each band contributed one song, with "White Depths Dove the Red-Eyed" from Celestiial.

=== Other projects ===
Outside of Celestiial, Anderson is a member of Obsequiae, and he is a former member of a black metal band, Azrael, and Autumnal Winds. Anderson is currently involved with several other projects. He is part of "an obscure death metal band" as well as several other small bands, which he has no desire to reveal details about. He is also involved in a long term project called Where Rivers End with A. Tolonen, from Nest and Shape of Despair, and Oscar Strik, formally of Pantheist. Anderson has also mentioned that he plays drums in Goatlust and plays guitars and provides vocals for Sidhe. Additionally, Jason Walton and Tim Glenn are both involved in several other projects. Walton is a member of the band Agalloch as well as Sculptured, Nothing and Subterranean Masquerade. Glenn is a founding member of the experimental/black metal band Heatdeath, who are signed to Conspiracy Records.

=== Anonymity ===
Despite the fact that other bands signed to Bindrune Recordings have MySpace profiles or websites, Anderson says that he has no desire to promote Celestiial, and beyond answering e-mails and chatting on message boards, desires no Internet presence, and only allows himself to be interviewed through devotion to Bindrune Recordings. He has said that he plays in a band where "anonymity is important/understood by all involved".

== Musical style ==
The music of Celestiial's debut album, Desolate North, makes use of minimal vocals, instead relying on electronics, guitars and syncopated drums (with liberal use of cymbals). Also, these are backed up by more traditional instruments, such as harps and Native American flutes. Also, there is the use of sampled sounds of footsteps, water, birdsong, wind and the like.

Celestiial is a funeral doom metal band. However, Desolate North has been described as taking the genre in new directions with comparisons to ambient, goth, experimental and dark folk music being made. The music has also been described as meditative and medieval.

Anderson admits that there may be death metal influences in the vocals, but says that it was not a conscious design, and that the music does not have any other similarities to death metal. He claims that there are no black metal influences. He says that describing Celestiial's music as folk is a bad idea, as folk is such a broad, vague description as to make it meaningless. He says that what he is creating is neither folk, nor traditional, and even the harp songs are not traditional works, though they are influenced by the traditional music of the United Kingdom and traditional Irish music.

== Imagery ==
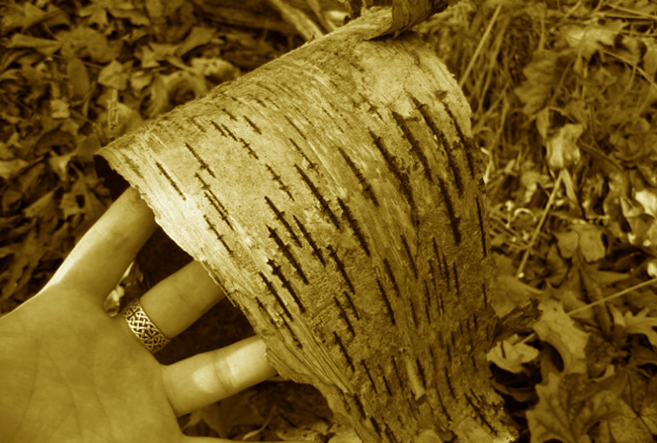
Tanner Anderson holding a piece of bark. Bindrune Recordings has described Celestiial as being "created to mirror mysticism in nature."

The music of Celestiial is primarily based around nature, with natural sounds sampled, and imagery involving woodland, and, as one reviewer put it, "the scary places that we all fear when the lights are out". Bindrune recordings describes this affinity for nature by saying that "Celestiial was created to mirror mysticism in nature." Anderson stated in a 2010 interview that Celestiial is a "personal response to my relationship with nature."

Some critics have talked of a black metal influence in imagery and naming. For instance, the name Celestiial has been compared to that of Mütiilation. Anderson responded to this by claiming that he doesn't know why people compare his music to black metal; hypothesising that it is simply the raw production of the music, or the double 'i' in the band name. He has instead described the double 'i' as being present in the name "to give it character."

Anderson was once asked about whether there were any pagan beliefs in Celestiial. Anderson responded that Celestiial "is romanticized Paganism with very real pagan values behind it." He talked of how Celestiial celebrated paganism and the natural world, but that paganism is often viewed as something that it is not.

== Discography ==
- Ashen (demo) (2004) (Self released as sample)
- Desolate North (2006) (Bindrune Recordings)
- Celestiial / Blood of the Black Owl (split) 12" LP (Bindrune Recordings)
- Where Life Springs Eternal (2010) (Bindrune Recordings)
