= Narqath =

Tomi Kalliola
- Also known as: Narqath, Godslayer Vassago, Nrq, Dragongod Narqath
- Born: Finland
- Genres: Black metal, symphonic black metal, doom metal, folk metal, ambient music, dungeon synth
- Occupation(s): Musician, singer-songwriter
- Instrument(s): Guitars, vocals, bass, keyboards, drums, tin whistle
- Years active: 1995–present
- Labels: Moribund Records
- Website: myspace.com/azaghalterrorcult,

Tomi Kalliola, although generally recognised by his stage name, Narqath, was born in Finland on 11 October 1979. In 1995, he and drummer, Kalma formed the Finnish black metal band Azaghal. Kalliola has played guitar, bass and keyboards, as well as utilizing vocals for Azaghal since formation to present. Besides Azaghal, Kalliola has played in many black metal bands and bands of other genres, some of which he writes and records all the music, such as Valar. Kalliola makes use of both harsh and clean vocals in his music projects. Narqath has stated that singing in Finnish has become a part of recognizable sound for Azaghal. However, he has also had some thoughts about doing a whole album with English lyrics. Azaghal remain mostly singing in Finnish, though, because their vocalist prefers to do so.

Narqath has said that when he formed Azaghal, he was influenced and inspired by the early Norwegian black metal scene, but also older bands like Mercyful Fate and Venom.

Tomi Kalliola is experienced in producing, mixing and mastering music for bands such as Azaghal and Wyrd. For example, he fully produced the Azaghal albums: Mustamaa, Helvetin Yhdeksän Piiriä and Perkeleen Luoma.

Kalliola currently resides in Hyvinkää, Finland.

== Discography ==
Azaghal

- Mustamaa (1999)
- Helvetin Yhdeksän Piiriä (1999)
- Of Beasts and Vultures (2002)
- Perkeleen Luoma (2004)
- Codex Antitheus (2005)
- Luciferin Valo (2006)
- Omega (2008)
- Teraphim (2009)
- Nemesis (2012)

Wyrd

- Heathen (2001)
- Huldrafolk (2002)
- Vargtimmen Pt. 1: The Inmost Night (2003)
- Vargtimmen Pt. 2: Ominous Insomnia (2004)
- Rota (2005)
- The Ghost Album (2006)
- Kammen (2007)

Valar

- Wings of Darkness (1997)
- Towards the Great Unknown (1998)
- By What Eternal Streams / Prologue (1998)
- The Arrival of the Dragonlord (1998)
- Where Dragons Forever War (1999)
- Hidden Paths (2000)
- Magic and Wyrmfire (2001)
- To Whatever End (2005)
- To Whatever End / Enslaved in Evil Darkness (2006)

Finnugor

- Black Flames (2002)
- Death Before Dawn (2003)
- Darkness Needs Us (2004)
