= Fhtagn nagh Yog-Sothoth =

- 2006 reissue cover

Studio album (demo) by Thergothon
- Released: November 1991
- Recorded: November 14–18, 1991
- Studio: Studio Tuotanto-Tekniikka
- Genre: Funeral doom
- Length: 25:09
- Label: Independent

Thergothon chronology
Fhtagn nagh Yog-Sothoth (1991)	Stream from the Heavens (1994)

Fhtagn nagh Yog-Sothoth is the only demo album by the funeral doom pioneers Thergothon. It originally was released in November 1991. It was reissued in 1992 by Wild Rags Records and in 1999 by Eibon Records. The demo was reissued again by Eibon in late 2005 or early 2006. This demo was released on Vinyl in 2006 by Painiac Records, with new artwork and a bonus track titled "Dancing in the Realm of Shades" from an unreleased rehearsal.

The American funeral doom band Evoken take their name from the second track of this demo.

== Track listing ==
1. "Elemental" – 7:51
2. "Evoken" – 7:21
3. "Yet the Watchers Guard" – 7:58
4. "The Twilight Fade" – 1:59
5. "Dancing in the Realm of Shades" (bonus track for 2006 release)
