= A Pyrrhic Existence =

Studio album by Esoteric
- Released: 8 November 2019
- Venue: Birmingham, United Kingdom
- Studio: Priory Recording Studios
- Genre: Funeral doom
- Length: 98:15
- Label: Season of Mist
- Producer: Esoteric

Esoteric chronology
Paragon of Dissonance (2011)	A Pyrrhic Existence (2019)

Singles from A Pyrrhic Existence
- 1. "Descent" Released: September 4, 2019; 2. "Rotting in Dereliction" Released: October 3, 2019

A Pyrrhic Existence is the seventh studio album by the British funeral doom band Esoteric. Just like the two previous albums before it, A Pyrrhic Existence is a double album. It was released on November 8, 2019 through Season of Mist.

A Pyrrhic Existence is Esoteric's final studio album featuring founding guitarist Gordon Bicknell, who left the band prior to its release.

== Reception ==
Professional ratings
Review scores
Source	Rating
Blabbermouth	8.5/10 stars
Metal Injection	10/10 stars
Metal Storm	Positive
Rock Hard	7.5/10 stars

A Pyrrhic Existence was released to positive reviews. Blabbermouth called lead single "Descent" an instant highlight, stating that when Greg Chandler's vocals "burst through the fog at the three-and-a-half-minute mark, it's like the voice of some fearsome, hateful deity resounding through thick storm clouds to the Earth below". Jerome Reuter of Metal Injection notably gave the album a perfect score commenting on how Esoteric have once again set the bar high by releasing a double album with no filler. He ended his review saying "A modern Greek tragedy told in six parts, it's nothing short of a theatrical masterpiece".

=== Accolades ===
Publication	Accolade	Rank	Ref.
Stereogum	Best Metal Albums 2019	5	

== Track listing ==
Disc one
No.	Title	Length
1.	"Descent"	27:39
2.	"Rotting in Dereliction"	15:51
3.	"Antim Yatra"	4:40
Total length:		48:10

Disc two
No.	Title	Length
1.	"Consuming Lies"	15:16
2.	"Culmination"	19:03
3.	"Sick and Tired"	15:46
Total length:		50:05; Total; 98:15

== Personnel ==
=== Esoteric ===
- Greg Chandler – vocals, guitars
- Gordon Bicknell – guitars
- Jim Nolan – guitars
- Mark Bodossian – bass
- Joe Fletcher – drums

=== Miscellaneous ===
- Lisa Schubert – cover art
