= Epistemological Despondency =

Studio album by Esoteric
- Released: October 1994
- Recorded: 6–16 June 1994
- Studio: Rich Bitch Studios, Birmingham
- Genre: Funeral doom metal
- Length: 89:00
- Label: Aesthetic Death
- Producer: Esoteric

Esoteric chronology
Esoteric Emotions - The Death of Ignorance (1993)	Epistemological Despondency (1994)	The Pernicious Enigma (1997)

Professional ratings
Review scores
Source	Rating
Sputnikmusic	4.5/5 stars

Epistomological Despondency is the first studio album by British doom metal band Esoteric. The album was released in 1994 as a double CD through Aesthetic Death Records, and was remastered and reissued in 2004. In a retrospective article written about the album by Metal Injection editor Cody Davis, the album "built Esoteric's foundation in funeral doom."

== Track listing ==
Disc one
No.	Title	Length
1.	"Bereft"	20:24
2.	"Only Hate (Baresark)"	2:41
3.	"The Noise of Depression"	18:59
Total length:		42:04

Disc two
No.	Title	Length
1.	"Lamented Despondency"	12:37
2.	"Eradification (of Thorns)"	7:19
3.	"Awaiting My Death"	26:07
Total length:		46:03; Total; 89:00

== Credits ==
- Bryan Beck – Bass guitar, fretless bass, effects and bass synth
- Gordon Bicknell – Lead guitar, effects, samples, synth
- Greg Chandler – vocals, effects
- Simon Phillips – Lead guitar, effects, samples
- Stuart Blekinsop – Guitar, effects
- Darren Earl – drums
- Steve Wilson – engineering, mixing
