= Azaghal =

Azaghal may refer to:

- Azaghâl, a fictional dwarf in J. R. R. Tolkien's Middle-earth writings
- Azaghal (band), a Finnish black metal band
