= Revelry =

Revelry may refer to:

- The revelries of Saturnalia
- The Revelry (album), by the Bullets and Octane
- Revelry (Beyond Dawn album)
- "Revelry" (song), by Kings of Leon
- "Revelry", a song by Yachts (band)
- Party
