= This Empty Flow =

Finnish rock band

Background information
- Origin: Turku, Finland
- Genres: Gothic rock, dream pop
- Years active: 1994–1996
- Labels: Avantgarde, Eibon
- Spinoff of: Thergothon
- Members: Jori Sjöroos; Aku-Tuomas Mattila; Jukka Sillanpää; Niko Sirkiä
- Website: www.nikoskorpio.net/1996/this-empty-flow/

This Empty Flow was a Finnish band formed in Turku in 1994. Founded by Jori Sjöroos and Niko Sirkiä, who were also the founding members of Thergothon, a Finnish band known for pioneering the funeral doom metal subgenre, although the music of This Empty Flow moved away from that sound into a more melodic, gothic rock and ambient-influenced style.

== Activity ==
Their debut album, Magenta Skycode, was released in 1996. They decided to disband thereafter because of the band's musical direction.

Since the split-up, there have been a few other releases. In 1999, Three Empty Boys was released and it included four songs of the unreleased follow-up to the debut album and 7 studio rehearsals/demos recorded in 1995–1997. A mini album called Useless and Empty Songs came out in 2000; in 2001 Nowafter, a compilation album with rare and unreleased songs, was released. Their releases are hard to find and remain cult items sought after by dark music lovers around the world.

In 2005, Sjöroos formed Magenta Skycode, taking the name from the eponymous album.

In March 2006, Eibon Records re-released Magenta Skycode along with a bonus CD of extra tracks from around the album's time period as a 2CD titled simply The Album.

On 16 April 2011 (Record Store Day 2011), Solina Records released This Empty Flow: Magenta Skycode 15th anniversary vinyl edition, limited only to 500 copies.

== Discography ==
- Magenta Skycode (1996)
- Three Empty Boys (1999)
- Useless and Empty Songs (2000)
- Nowafter (2001)
- The Album (2006)
- Magenta Skycode (2011)
