= Thergothon =

Finnish doom metal band

Background information
- Origin: Kaarina, Finland
- Genre: Funeral doom metal
- Years active: 1990–1993
- Labels: Avantgarde, Eibon
- Spinoffs: This Empty Flow
- Members: Niko Skorpio; Mikko Ruotsalainen; Jori Sjöroos
- Past members: Sami Kaveri

Thergothon was a Finnish funeral doom metal band active from 1990 to 1993. They are one of the pioneers of the funeral doom subgenre. The band only released one demo, Fhtagn nagh Yog-Sothoth (1991), and one album, Stream from the Heavens (1994). Their sound was extremely slow and dirge-like in long pieces, which combined heavy guitar riffs, extremely deep death grunts and sparse lead guitar melodies. They disbanded a year before the release of the album and its members focused on other projects.

Niko Sirkiä and Jori Sjöroos went on to form This Empty Flow, which marked a distinct stylistic departure from Thergothon. The project began as somewhat of a shoegaze band, taking cues from groups like Slowdive, but ended up as more in the area of trip hop. Lately, Sjöroos has gained reputation for composing songs for popular Finnish pop rock act PMMP. Sirkiä, later known as Niko Skorpio, works as a visual artist and records experimental electronic music. He also used to run a record label called Some Place Else.

== History ==
The band was founded in 1990 by vocalist Niko Skorpio, drummer Jori Sjöroos and guitarist Mikko Ruotsalainen as a death metal band, but soon became a doom metal band. In early 1991, Sami Kaveri was added as a second guitarist. A first demo recorded afterwards titled Dancing in the Realm of Shades was never officially released and the band made a new attempt in November 1991. This demo, titled Fhtagn nagh Yog-Sothoth, was released the same year in a limited edition of 600 copies and was licensed to the US and Poland. In the spring of 1992, the band gave two concerts in or near Turku, where they played an extremely slow version of Venom's "In League with Satan". The band itself did not find concerts as an appropriate presentation of the studio material.

Preparations for the debut album began in the summer of 1992. Sami Kaveri left the band at that time and the band focused entirely on the role of a studio band, neither playing live nor rehearsing for it. Through this concentration of roles and people, the roles gradually dissolved and the members of the band exchanged their instruments and experimented with new ones. After the band had signed with the Italian label Obscure Plasma Records and began recording Stream from the Heavens in autumn 1992; two of the six songs on it were new recordings of songs from Fhtagn-nagh Yog-Sothoth. After completing the recordings and selecting the cover for the debut, the group decided to disband in spring 1993. The release of the album was delayed until 1994 and it was highly neglected by the music press. With time however, it sold several thousand copies worldwide.

In 2009, Russian record label Solitude Productions released a tribute album titled Rising of Yog-Sothoth: A Tribute to Thergothon, which contains contributions from bands such as Worship, Evoken and Asunder, Mournful Congregation, Colosseum and Officium Triste.

== Musical style and themes ==
Thergothon's music was very slow with extremely deep guttural vocals, using heavy guitar riffs, very deeply-tuned guitars and with few lead guitar melodies. In addition to death metal, the band also integrated influences from styles such as gothic rock, ambient and progressive rock.

Cosmic horror author H. P. Lovecraft remained a prevalent influence throughout their discography, as evidenced by titles such as Fhtagn nagh Yog-Sothoth and The Unknown Kadath in the Cold Waste. When asked why the Cthulhu Mythos had such an appeal to musicians, Scorpio responded:

The intense atmosphere of course! Not only horror, though, more than that. I've always been more into his way of describing the otherworldy and the style of raising tension by revealing the mystery sparingly. And then there's the distant piping of the accursed flutes to recreate in this world, in honour of the Blind Idiot God...

== Members ==
Last lineup

- Niko Sirkiä (a.k.a. Niko Skorpio) – vocals, keyboards
- Jori Sjöroos – drums
- Mikko Ruotsalainen – guitar

Former members

- Sami Kaveri – guitar

== Discography ==
Studio albums

- Stream from the Heavens (1994)

Demos

- Fhtagn nagh Yog-Sothoth (1991)

== Bibliography ==
- Hill, Gary (2006). The Strange Sound of Cthulhu: Music Inspired By the Writings of H. P. Lovecraft. US: Music Street Journal. ISBN 978-1-84728-776-2.
