= Kuu =

Kuu may refer to:

- Kuu (Liberia) refers to a labor-sharing arrangement in the West African country of Liberia
- Kuu (Finland) refers to the moon goddess in Finnish mythology
- Kuu.., a 2011 album by Kauan
- Kullu–Manali Airport (IATA code: KUU)
