= Celestiial / Blood of the Black Owl =

Celestiial / Blood of the Black Owl Split

EP (Split album) by Celestiial and Blood of the Black Owl
- Released: June 2008
- Genre: Funeral doom metal, black metal
- Length: 33:59
- Label: Bindrune Recordings
- Producer: Mel Detmer

Celestiial chronology
Desolate North (2006)	Celestiial / Blood of the Black Owl (2008)	Where Life Springs Eternal (2009)

Blood of the Black Owl chronology
A Feral Spirit (2008)	Celestiial / Blood of the Black Owl (2008)

Celestiial / Blood of the Black Owl Split is a split album released by Bindrune Recordings featuring one song each from funeral doom metal bands Celestiial and Blood of the Black Owl. It was limited to 500 12" vinyls, with each song exclusive to the album, and the first 50 albums shipped were delivered with two cloth patches.

== Track listing ==
1. "White Depths Dove the Red-Eyed" (16:54) (Celestiial)
2. "Contemplating the Death of an Old Friend" (17:05) (Blood of the Black Owl)
