= Esoteric Emotions – The Death of Ignorance =

The Death of Ignorance

Studio album (Demo tape) by Esoteric
- Released: 30 July 1993
- Recorded: 1993
- Studio: Rich Bitch Studios, Birmingham
- Genre: Doom metal
- Length: 78:06
- Label: Self-released
- Producer: Esoteric

Esoteric chronology
The Death of Ignorance (1993)	Epistemological Despondency (1994)

Esoteric Emotions – The Death of Ignorance is the debut demo album by the British doom metal band Esoteric. Noted for its usage of effects pedals, something not commonly used in metal music up to that point in time, the demo would obtain the attention of independent label Aesthetic Death, who issued the band's first two albums Epistemological Despondency and The Pernicious Enigma. The demo was released by the band in small runs on cassette only, and in 2000 it was reissued on CD-R through the band, though bootlegged versions exist of this edition. The demo would see an official CD release in 2017 through Aesthetic Death Records as part of the band's 25th anniversary.

A common misconception is that the band's name was Esoteric Emotions when it was released, however vocalist Greg Chandler has stated that "Esoteric Emotions" was meant to be only part of the title.

== Track listing ==
Side A

No.	Title	Length
1.	"Esoteric"	9:06
2.	"In Solitude"	7:10
3.	"Enslavers of the Insecure"	8:44
4.	"Scarred"	12:13

Side B

No.	Title	Length
5.	"Eyes of Darkness"	16:48
6.	"Infanticidal Fantasies"	7:56
7.	"Expectations of Love"	8:15
8.	"The Laughter of the Ignorant"	7:14

== Credits ==
Esoteric

- Bryan Beck – Bass, fretless Bass, effects and bass synth
- Gordon Bicknell – Lead guitar, effects, samples, synthesizer
- Greg Chandler – Vocals, effects
- Simon – Lead Guitar, effects, samples
- Stuart Blenkinsopp – Guitar, effects
- Darren – Drums

Production

- Alex Tepper – engineering, mixing
