= Kostas Panagiotou (musician) =

Greek musician and music journalist

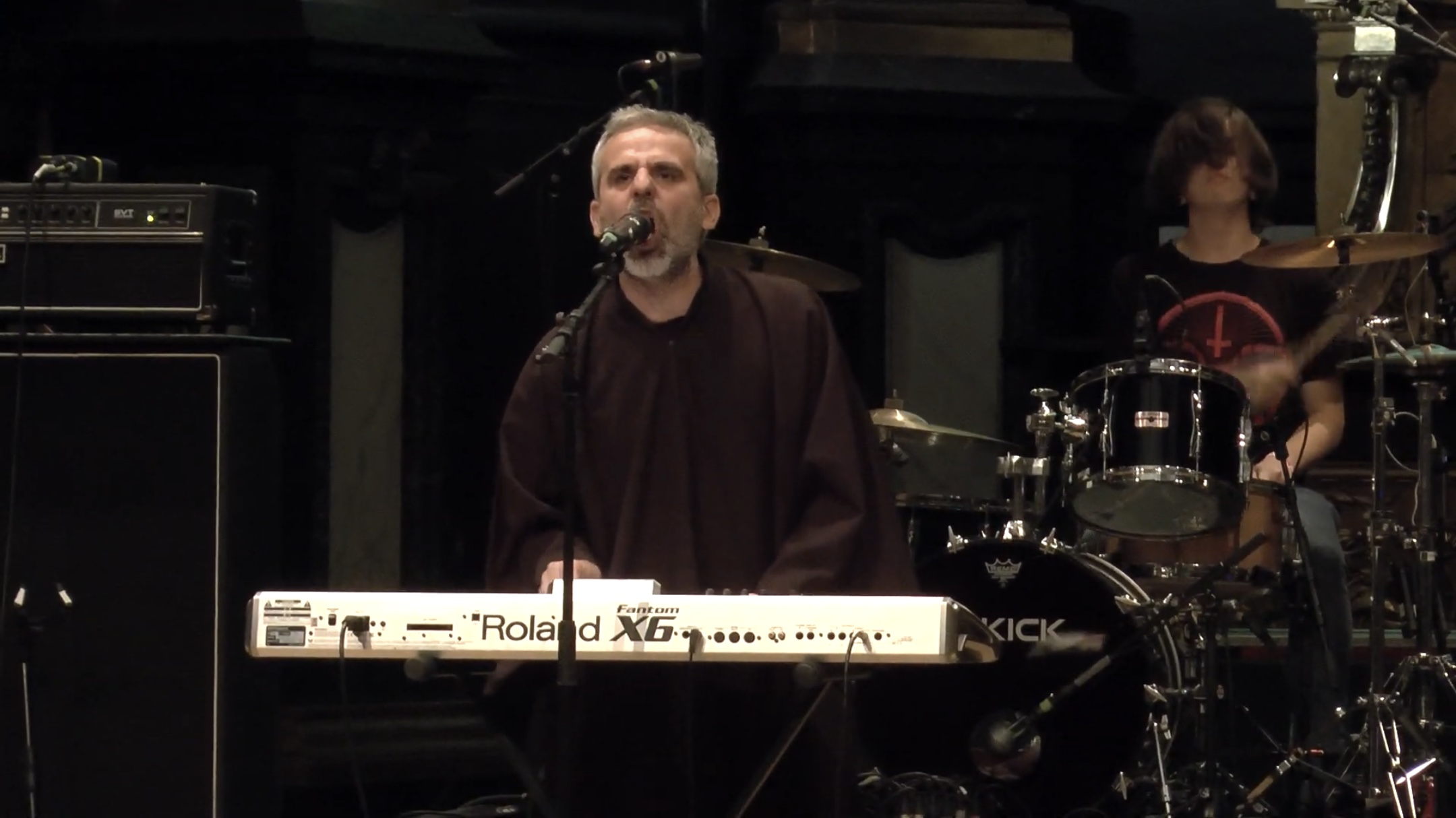
- Panagiotou performing in Antwerp in 2019

Background information
- Born: 8 August 1977 (age 48); Kavala, Greece
- Genres: Funeral doom, doom metal, rock, dark wave, post-industrial
- Occupations: Singer, musician, music journalist
- Instruments: Vocals, keyboards, guitar
- Label: Melancholic Realm Productions
- Member of: Pantheist, Towards Atlantis Lights
- Formerly of: Crippled Black Phoenix, Wijlen Wij, Aphonic Threnody, Clouds

Kostas Panagiotou (born 8 August 1977) is a Greek singer, musician and music journalist. He is best known for his work in funeral doom and doom metal, particularly as a member of Pantheist.

== Life ==
Panagiotou was born in Kavala, Greece. He lived for part of his youth in Belgium, where he began his musical career and collaborated, among others, with Stijn van Cauter.

In 2004, he moved to London, where he lived for several years and contributed interviews and reviews to the webzine Doom-Metal.com. He studied clinical psychology in Brussels and forensic psychology in London.

In 2011, he was interviewed by the German music magazine Metal Hammer as an expert on funeral doom.

== Career ==
Panagiotou became known in the 2000s through his involvement with several funeral doom groups. He later contributed to artists in the rock and doom metal spectrum, including Crippled Black Phoenix, Se Delan and A Dream of Poe, as well as acts in the fields of dark wave and post-industrial music, such as Ereipia.

Among the best-known acts with which he has been involved are Pantheist, which is considered his main project, as well as Crippled Black Phoenix, Wijlen Wij, Towards Atlantis Lights and Aphonic Threnody. He has also appeared as a guest or temporary member of Arð, Clouds, Wastes, Landskap, Bellator, Daylight Misery and Mourning Dawn.

Panagiotou primarily plays keyboards and performs as a vocalist. In Wijlen Wij, he also contributed as a guitarist. In 2018, for the release of the Pantheist album Seeking Infinity, Panagiotou founded the label Melancholic Realm Productions. The label later released the second Towards Atlantis Lights album, When the Ashes Devoured the Sun, in 2021.

== Discography ==
=== Solo ===
- Unveiling the Signs – split album, Redrum666 (2010)
- Chapters – download EP, self-released (2016)
- Chamber of Isolation – download album, self-released (2020)
- Times of Change – download EP, self-released (2020)
- The Dragon's View – download single, self-released (2021)
- Tor – album, Melancholic Realm Productions (2023)

=== With Aphonic Threnody ===
- First Funeral (2013)
- When Death Comes (2014)
- The Loneliest Walk (2022)

=== With Clouds ===
- Doliu (2014)
- Departe (2016)

=== With Crippled Black Phoenix ===
- A Love of Shared Disasters (2007)
- The Resurrectionists (2009)
- Night Raider (2009)
- Great Escape (2018)
