= Anton Belov (musician) =

Anton Belov Антон Белов
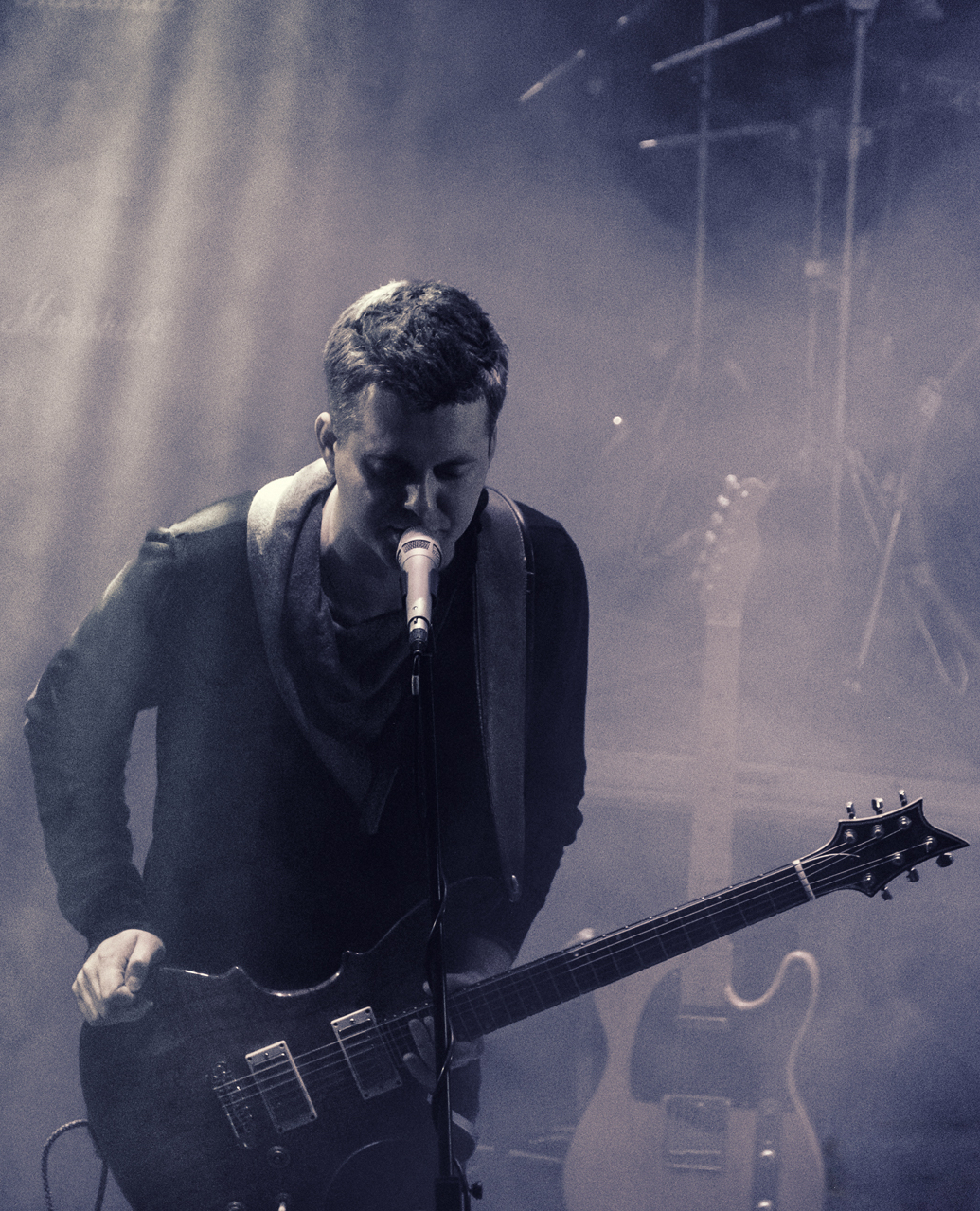
- Anton Belov playing live with KAUAN in Kyiv, Ukraine in 2017

Background information
- Born: 3 February 1989 (age 36)
- Origin: Chelyabinsk, Russian SFSR, USSR
- Genres: Doom metal, black metal, post-metal, ambient
- Instrument(s): Vocals, guitar, keyboards, flute, percussion
- Member of: Kauan, Helengard, a noend of mine
- Website: kauanmusic.com/anton-belov

Anton Belov (born 3 February 1989) is a Russian songwriter, singer, multi-instrumentalist musician, and record producer from Chelyabinsk, Russian SFSR, USSR, who moved to Kyiv, Ukraine in 2010 and is now located in Helsinki, Finland. He founded the ambient post-metal project Kauan and studio-only project Helengard and released instrumental music under his own name.

== Career ==
Anton started playing guitar and composing music in the early 2000s, around the same time as his growing interest in the Finnish language and culture. Together with Alexander Borovykh, they formed the studio-only project KAUAN in 2007 and signed with Solitude Productions with their first album, Lumikuuro. Anton chose the Finnish language for the lyrics and vocal parts because of the aesthetics and beauty of its sound. Since then, most of his works have been done in Finnish.

In 2010, Anton moved to Kyiv, Ukraine, where he turned KAUAN into a full line-up band and toured around the EU and Ukraine up to 2018. In 2017, Anton started his solo self-titled instrumental project and collaborated with Finnish poet and songwriter Marja Mattlar, who wrote lyrics for KAUAN's album Kaiho. Later the same year, they recorded the EP “Kohti,” for which Anton made arrangements and production. In 2019, he moved to Tallinn, Estonia, technically turning KAUAN into a studio-only project. Later, in 2021, he formed a new line-up by moving again to Helsinki, Finland, and now the band is playing live again.

== Discography ==
=== KAUAN ===
==== Studio albums ====
- Guitars, programming, keyboards, flute, vocals on Lumikuuro (2007)
- Guitars, programming, keyboards, percussion, vocals on Tietäjän Laulu (2008)
- Guitars, programming, keyboards, percussion, vocals on Aava tuulen maa (2009)
- Guitars, keyboards, vocals on Kuu (2011)
- Guitars, programming, keyboards, vocals on Pirut (2013)
- Guitars, programming, keyboards, vocals on Muistumia (2014)
- Guitars, keyboards, vocals on Sorni Nai (2015)
- Guitars, keyboards, vocals on Kaiho (2017)
- Guitars, keyboards, vocals on Ice Fleet (2021)

==== Live albums ====
- Guitars and vocals on Sorni Nai Live (2021)
- Guitars and vocals on Pirut Live (2022)
- Guitars and vocals on Lumikuuro Live (2022)

==== Reworks and revisions ====
- Guitars, programming, keyboards, vocals on Muistumia (2014)
- Guitars, keyboards on ATM Revised (2023)

=== Anton Belov ===
==== Studio albums ====
- Keyboards, programming on Kohti (EP with Marja Mattlar, 2017)
- Guitars, keyboards, programming on Piano Works I (2018)
- Guitars, keyboards, programming on Piano Works II (2019)

=== Helengard ===
==== Studio albums ====
- Guitars, keyboards, vocals on Skiringssal (demo, 2005)
- Guitars, keyboards, vocals on Helengard (2010)
- Guitars, keyboards, vocals on Firebird (2017)

=== a noend of mine ===
- The Serenity’s Eve (2018)
