= The Maniacal Vale =

Studio album by Esoteric
- Released: 26 June 2008
- Studio: Priory Recording
- Genre: Funeral doom metal
- Length: 101:49
- Label: Season of Mist
- Producer: Esoteric

Esoteric chronology
Subconscious Dissolution into the Continuum (2004)	The Maniacal Vale (2008)	Paragon of Dissonance (2011)

Professional ratings
Review scores
Source	Rating
MetalReview	5/6 stars
Sputnikmusic	4/5 stars
AllMusic	4.5/5 stars

The Maniacal Vale is the fifth studio album by the British funeral doom metal band Esoteric. It is a double album and was released on 26 June 2008 through French label Season of Mist. Recorded, mixed and mastered by Esoteric at Priory Recording Studios. Artwork by Kati Astraeir.

== Track listing ==
- All songs credited to Esoteric. Actual writers listed below.

=== Disc 1 ===
No.	Title	Length
1.	"Circle (Greg Chandler, Gordon Bicknell)"	20:45
2.	"Beneath This Face (Chandler)"	11:21
3.	"Quickening (Chandler, Oliver Goyet)"	12:18
4.	"Caucus of Mind (Bicknell)"	7:21
Total length:		51:45

=== Disc 2 ===
No.	Title	Length
1.	"Silence (Chandler)"	15:44
2.	"The Order of Destiny (Chandler, Bicknell)"	11:32
3.	"Ignotum Per Ignotius (Mark Bodossian)"	22:42
Total length:		49:58

== Personnel ==
- Gordon Bicknell - Guitar
- Mark Bodossian - Bass
- Greg Chandler - Vocals, Guitar
- Joe Fletcher - Drums
- Olivier Goyet - Keyboards
