= Magenta Skycode =

Finnish indie rock group

- Origin: Turku, Finland
- Genres: Indie rock, dream pop, post-punk
- Years active: 2005–2014
- Members: Jori Sjöroos; Tomi Mäkilä; Niko Kivikangas; Henry Ojala; Kalle Taivainen
- Website: www.facebook.com/people/Magenta-Skycode/100034571662434/

Magenta Skycode was an indie rock band from Turku, Finland, formed in 2005 by Jori Sjöroos. The band's members were Tomi Mäkilä on keyboard and synthesizer, percussionist Niko Kivikangas, guitarist Henry Ojala, bassist Kalle Taivainen and singer and songwriter Jori Sjöroos, previously known as Fu-Tourist. Sjöroos also formed This Empty Flow and produced another Finnish pop rock band PMMP. Magenta Skycode is the name of This Empty Flow's debut album.

== Albums ==
- IIIII (2006)
- Relief (2010)

== EPs ==
- Compassion (2005)
- We Will Be Warm (2013)
