= The Frozen Autumn =

Italian darkwave band

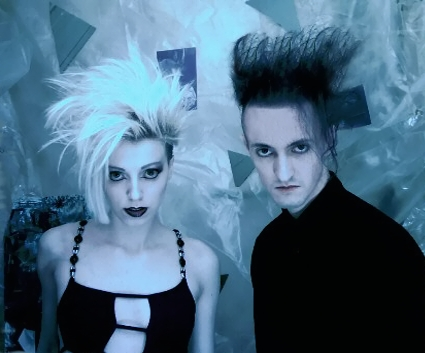

Background information
- Origin: Turin, Italy
- Genres: Darkwave; synthpop; gothic rock
- Years active: 1993–present
- Labels: Calembour Records; Twilight Records; Pandaimonium; Eibon Records; Weisser Herbst Produktion; Metropolis Records
- Members: Diego Merletto; Arianna a.k.a. Froxeanne
- Past members: Claudio Brosio; Stefano Nieri "The Count"
- Website: Official site

The Frozen Autumn is an Italian darkwave band, formed in May 1993, characterized by a blend of melancholic vocals, atmospheric gothic-wave and 1980s-style electropop.

== History ==
The Frozen Autumn started life as the solo project of Diego Merletto, founded after several years of involvement with various darkwave groups in Turin. The singer, keyboardist and synth programmer employed the talents of guitarist Claudio Brosio during early studio sessions and live performances, then in 1995 the first album, Pale Awakening, was released under the German Weisser Herbst Produktion label. The album was well received by gothic-wave/dark-romantic fans across Europe, and in 1997 the follow-up was released, Fragments of Memories, this time by Milan-based Eibon Records.

In 1998, Merletto co-founded a side-project called Static Movement with Arianna, who provided guest vocals on the title-track from Fragments of Memories. The duo composed together for six months and in March 1999 the album Visionary Landscapes was released. The musical style of Static Movement was not dissimilar to The Frozen Autumn, however with only electronic instruments being used, the result was a more synthetic coldwave sound. The partnership proved fruitful for both parties and so Arianna became a permanent fixture in The Frozen Autumn line-up, Static Movement remaining their "concept research project".

After 18 months working on The Frozen Autumn's third album, Emotional Screening Device was released in April 2002 and hailed as the group's best album to date. They decided to leave Eibon Records in 2003 and, while contemplating offers coming in from both Italian and foreign labels, spent over two years on the next album. Is Anybody There? was finally released in September 2005 by the Argentinean label Twilight Records and German label Pandaimonium through Xymox Control.

Merletto has since been working on his video art which has in recent years become an integral part of the band's live shows, while in addition to playing concerts all over Europe and collaborating with various artists, the duo have (as of October 2006) begun the process of reprinting The Frozen Autumn's back catalogue. In 2009, Pale Awakening, Fragments of Memories and Visionary Landscapes were re-printed through Twilight Records. At the same, The Frozen Autumn announced that Ashes is no longer their official fan club. In September 2009, a new official forum was created.

In December 2009, The Frozen Autumn published on their Facebook a "manifesto against music killers", stating their position on music sharing over the Internet. In the same article they pointed out that they were exploited by someone who they thought as a good friend.

At the end of 2010, a new 10" single, "Rallentears" was released. The song is on their new label, Calembour Records, as a forerunner of their next album, called Chirality, which was released in November 2011.

Many fans of the band ask one another, which is the music genre that best describes The Frozen Autumn, as the band works in various styles such as darkwave, cold wave, gothic and new wave. The duo call their style "frozen wave".

The Frozen Autumn were to embark on their first visit to America, occurring on the West Coast in Autumn of 2013.

A new EP titled Lie in Wait was released in December 2014 by Calembour Records and this was followed in 2015 by a "best of" compilation vinyl, Time Is Just a Memory on Dark Entries Records.

After working on it since spring-summer 2015, the band's latest album The Fellow Traveller was released on November 3, 2017 by Echozone/Soulfood and Metropolis Records.

=== Inspiration ===
The Frozen Autumn have stated that labelmates Clan of Xymox have been their main source of inspiration over the years. In 2000, Diego and Arianna were invited by Clan of Xymox founder Ronny Moorings to do a remix of his new track, "There's No Tomorrow", which was included on the single. They collaborated a second time when Moorings remixed "Ashes", which featured as a bonus track on the 2005 album Is Anybody There?. Other influences of the duo include Dead Can Dance, Cocteau Twins, the Sisters of Mercy, Xmal Deutschland, David Sylvian and Depeche Mode.

== Discography ==
=== Studio albums ===
- Pale Awakening (1995) – reprint in 2009
- Fragments of Memories (1997) – reprint in 2009
- Emotional Screening Device (2002) – reprint in 2012
- Is Anybody There? (2005) – reprint in 2013
- Chirality (2011)
- The Fellow Traveller (2017)
- The Shape Of Things To Come (2023)

=== Other ===
- Visionary Landscapes (1999) – from Diego and Arianna's side-project, Static Movement – reprint in 2009
- The Pale Collection (2000) – re-printed version of Pale Awakening including a remix of "This Time" and one new recording, a cover of Decoded Feedback's "Bio-Vital".
- Rallentears (2010) – limited 10" including three songs from Chirality and a new version of "Wait for Nothing" from Pale Awakening
- Lie in Wait (2014) – EP
- Time Is Just a Memory (2015) – compilation

=== DVD ===
- Seen from Under Ice (2010)

== Members ==
- Diego Merletto (1993–present) – vocals, synthesizers, samplers, programming and effects
- Arianna a.k.a. Froxeanne (1998–present) – vocals, synthesizers, samplers, programming and effects
- Claudio Brosio (1994–1998) – guitar
- Stefano Nieri (2007–2011) – guitar from "Act Noir"
- "The Count" (2009–2013) – synths, samplers, programs, fx from "Nabla Operator"

== Instruments ==
A big part of the group's sound has been attributed to the classic polyphonic synthesizer Elka Synthex (also known for the preset sound that is used by Jean Michel Jarre for his laser harp sound).
