= Unholy (band) =

Finnish doom metal band

- Unholy

Background information
- Origin: Imatra, Finland
- Genres: Doom metal; Death-doom; Funeral doom; Avant-garde metal; Black-doom (early)
- Years active: 1990–1994, 1996-2002, 2009-2012
- Labels: Peaceville Records; Avantgarde Music; Lethal Records
- Past members: Pasi Äijö; Ismo Toivonen; Jarkko Toivonen; Jan Kuhanen; Veera Muhli; Jade Vanhala; Kimmo Hänninen
- Website: unholy.fi

Unholy was a Finnish avant-garde doom metal band. Formed in 1988, they were one of the first doom metal groups in their home country.

== History ==
Unholy originally started as a black-doom hybrid in 1988 under the name Holy Hell. After recording their first two demos in 1989, "Unhallowed Passion" and "Kill Jesus", they ultimately changed their name to Unholy in 1990. The band achieved underground popularity with its next demo and the 1991 EP Trip to Depressive Autumn, and signed with Lethal Records, an Austrian record label that released the band's first album, From the Shadows, in 1993. Unholy then signed with Avantgarde Music for the next album, The Second Ring of Power, but disbanded soon after its release in 1994. However, they re-formed only two years later.

Unholy released their last two albums, Rapture and Gracefallen, also through Avantgarde Music. The band announced they were splitting up on 25 March 2002.

In 2008, Unholy started co-operation with Ahdistuksen Aihio label to release all demos as vinyl, which were released in spring 2011 with complete history booklet of the band. After Peaceville Records bought them album release rights from Avantgarde Music, they started to negotiate for re-issuing all full-length albums. The reissuing project had some changes to cover arts but also for album songs list. Gracefallen got one bonus track titled "Gone" which was recorded originally during Gracefallen recording sessions, but was left out from the original release. Rapture included two live bonus tracks from year 1999. The Second Ring of Power not only had completely new cover artwork, but it also included a bonus DVD from the 1994 gig.

In the beginning of 2012, Unholy started to do preparations and rehearsals for combined comeback and farewell project with so called original line-up. This would last only for summer 2012. After that band would split up again. The band played four open air festival live shows in summer 2012, as the spirit of "good old times for good old fans"; to in Finland, one in Germany and one in Romania. In autumn, the band announced in its official website that "hats are off", meaning they retired as planned.

== Members ==
=== Final line-up ===
- Pasi Äijö – vocals, bass (1988-1994, 1996–2002, 2012)
- Ismo Toivonen – guitar, keyboards (1988-1994, 1996–2002, 2012)
- Jarkko Toivonen – guitar (1988-1994, 2012)
- Jan Kuhanen – drums (1991-1994, 1996–2002, 2012)

=== Past members ===
- Kimmo Hänninen – drums (1988-1991)
- Mika Arponen - drums (1991)
- Waltteri Myllynen - guitar (1993)
- Jade Vanhala – guitar (1999-2002)
- Veera Muhli – keyboard, vocals (1998-2000)

Timeline

== Discography ==
=== Albums ===
- From the Shadows (1993)
- The Second Ring of Power (1994)
- Rapture (1998)
- Gracefallen (1999)

=== EPs ===
- Trip to Depressive Autumn (1992)

=== Demos ===
- Unhallowed Passion (as Holy Hell; 1989)
- Kill Jesus (as Holy Hell; 1989)
- Procession of Black Doom (1990)
- Demo 11.90 (1990)
