= The Pernicious Enigma =

Studio album by Esoteric
- Released: April 1997
- Recorded: 9–26 July 1996
- Studio: Rich Bitch Studios, Birmingham
- Genre: Funeral doom; death-doom
- Length: 115:00
- Label: Aesthetic Death
- Producer: Esoteric, Steve Wilson

Esoteric chronology
Epistemological Despondency (1994)	The Pernicious Enigma (1997)	Metamorphogenesis (1999)

Professional ratings
Review scores
Source	Rating
Ave Noctum	9/10 stars

The Pernicious Enigma is the second studio album by the British doom metal band Esoteric. It was released in 1997 through Aesthetic Death Records. The Pernicious Enigma comprises two discs with a total running time of an hour and 55 minutes.

The album has received much praise since its release, and is seen as one of the band's best works. It has been cited to have helped influence the funeral doom and death-doom genres. The album would later be remastered and released as a three-disc vinyl set in 2016, limited to only 600 copies. A CD edition based on this remaster was issued in 2018.

== Production ==
The album was recorded at Rich Bitch Studios during the month of July 1996 and was mixed in October the same year, starting on the 9th and ending on the 15th. Mixing duties were held by the band itself, while the production and engineering featured the band being assisted by Steve Wilson. Anthony Brewer was hired as a session drummer to record on a few tracks on the album. The album was mastered at Strype Audio Studios, Oslo, Norway by Tom Kvalsvoll. The track "NOXBC9701040" was improvised in studio on 21 July 1996.

For the remaster, the album was mixed and mastered by Greg Chandler in 2015. Kevin Metcalfe also helped cut the lacquer used for the record manufacturing for the album at Soundmasters, London, United Kingdom.

== Track listing ==
Disc one
No.	Title	Length
1.	"Creation (Through Destruction)"	13:13
2.	"Dominion of Slaves"	16:01
3.	"Allegiance"	11:50
4.	"NOXBC9701040"	12:48
Total length:		53:52

Disc two
No.	Title	Length
1.	"Sinistrous"	12:40
2.	"At War with the Race"	2:52
3.	"A Worthless Dream"	13:09
4.	"Stygian Narcosis"	13:17
5.	"Passing Through Matter"	19:15
Total length:		61:13; Total; 115:00

== Credits ==
Original 1997 edition personnel

- Bryan Beck – bass guitar, and bass synth
- Gordon Bicknell – lead guitar, effects, synth
- Greg Chandler – vocals, effects
- Simon Phillips – lead guitar, effects, samples
- Steve Peters – guitar, samples
- Anthony Brewer – session drums ("Creation (Through Destruction)", "Dominion of Slaves", "Allegiance", "A Worthless Dream", and "Passing through Matter")
- Steve Wilson – engineering, mixing
- Tom Kvalsvoll – mastering

Additional 2016 remaster personnel

- Kevin Metcalfe – vinyl master cutting
- Mauro Berchi – layout
- Greg Chandler – mastering
