= Pantheist (band) =

Belgian and British funeral doom band

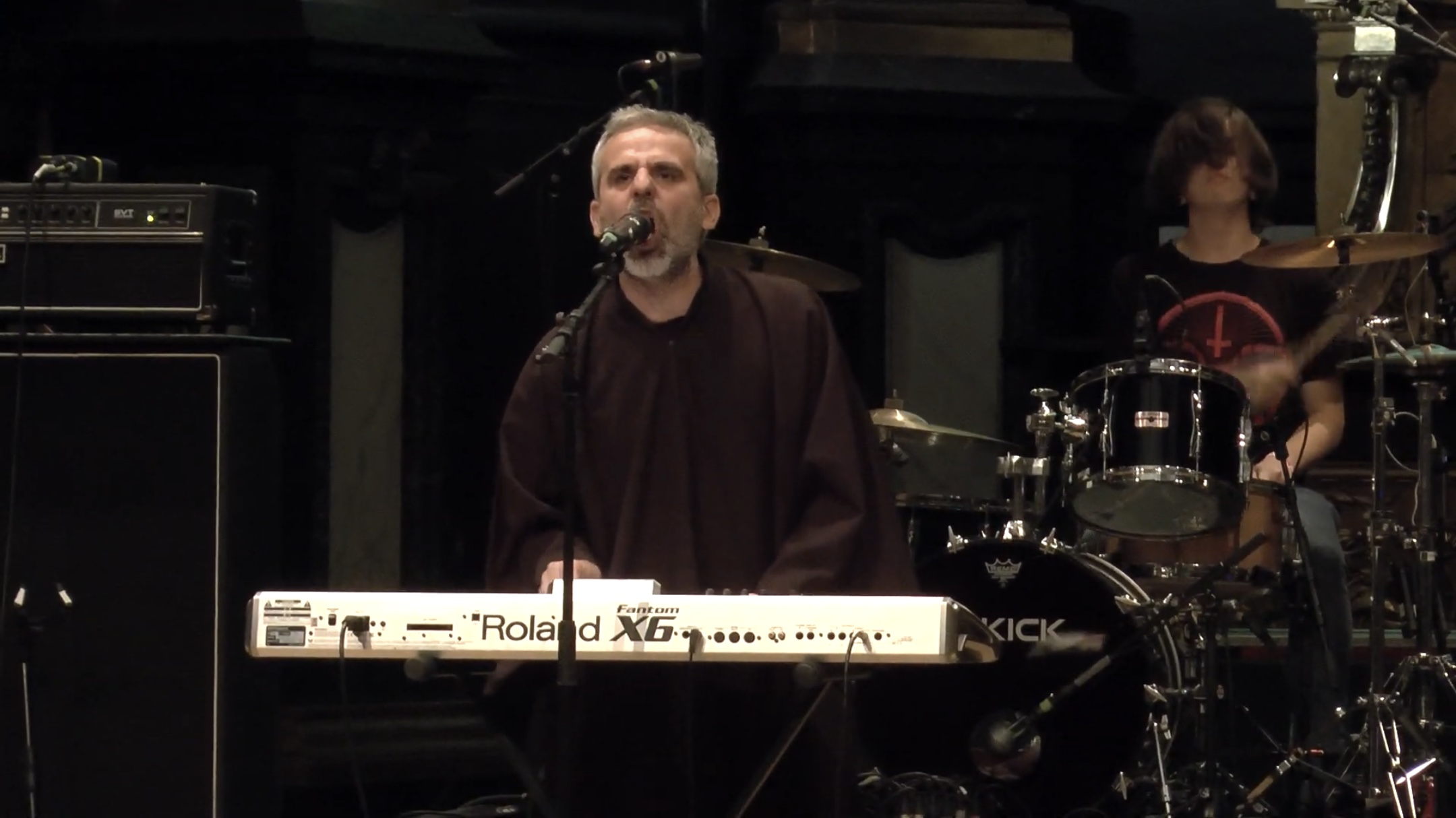
- Kostas Panagiotou performing with Pantheist in AMUZ, Antwerp, Belgium in 2019

Background information
- Origin: Antwerp, Belgium
- Genres: Funeral doom metal; progressive doom
- Years active: 2000–present
- Labels: Melancholic Realm Productions, Firedoom Music, Firebox Records, Grau Records
- Members: Kostas Panagiotou, Daniel Neagoe, Xander
- Website: www.pantheist.co.uk

Pantheist (stylised as Pantheïst) are a Belgian and British funeral doom band formed in 2000 by Kostas Panagiotou.

== Background ==
Pantheist was formed in 2000 by Greek musician Kostas Panagiotou in Antwerp, Belgium. Initially a solo project, he recorded a synth ambient demo which was never released. He was later joined by Nicolas Tambuyser, who played guitar. They shortly after recorded their first demo, 1000 Years. In 2002, bassist Frédéric Caure and drummer Oscar Strik joined the band. In 2003, they released their first album, O Solitude, through Firebox Records. The following year, Caure and Strik left the band, citing musical differences, and were replaced by Kris Villez on drums and Wim Boey on bass.

In 2004, Panagiotou moved the band to the United Kingdom, although Tambuyser remained in Belgium and was still a member of the band. For their second album, Amartia, Pantheist was joined by Mark Bodossian and Andy Semmens of Esoteric on bass and drums/vocals respectively, as session musicians. At this time Ilia Rodriguez also joined the band on guitar and whilst Semmens focused on vocals, Sterghios Moschos joined on drums, the new lineup producing the “Pains of Sleep EP”. In 2008, the band released their third studio album, Journey Through Lands Unknown, recorded at Priory Recording studios. It took 18 months to write and produce.

In 2011, the band released their self-titled fourth album through Grau Records. The album represented a change in direction to a more progressive style of doom metal, incorporating elements of progressive rock, dark wave, and new wave. In 2016, frontman Kostas Panagiotou released a 145-page science fiction novel, Events (Or Professor Losaline’s Extraordinary Journey into the Unknown), alongside his solo EP Chapters. Each of the six tracks from the EP accompanies one of the six chapters of the novel. The intention of the novel was to fund the production of Pantheist's fifth full-length album, Seeking Infinity. Released in 2018, the album marked a return to the band's traditional funeral doom and death-doom style, though it still retained some elements of progressive and neofolk metal.

== Band members ==
=== Current members ===
- Kostas Panagiotou – vocals, keyboards (2000–present)
- Xander – guitar (2019–present)
- Daniel Neagoe – drums (2016–present)

=== Past and session members ===
- Nicolas Tambuyser – guitars (2000–2005)
- Lawrence Van Haecke – bass (2001)
- Oscar Strik – drums (2002–2004)
- Arne Pinto De Carvalho – guitars (2003–2004)
- Frédéric Caure – bass (2003–2004)
- Wim Boey – bass (2004)
- Kris Villez – drums (2004)
- Andy Semmens – vocals (2004–2008)
- Mark Bodossian – bass, vocals (2004–2010)
- Ilia Rodriguez – guitars, vocals (2005–2011)
- Sterghios Moschos – drums (2005–2014)
- Peter Benjamin – guitars (2006–2009)
- Pepijn van Houwelingen – guitars, vocals (2006–2009)
- Aleksej Obradovic – bass (2011–2019)
- Valter Cunha – guitars (2014–2017)
- Frank Allain – guitars (2015–2019)
- Siebe Hermans – drums (2019)

== Discography ==
=== Studio albums ===
- O Solitude (2003)
- Amartia (2005)
- Journey Through Lands Unknown (2008)
- Pantheist (2011)
- Seeking Infinity (2018)
- Closer to God (2021)
- Uncanny Times (2026)

=== EPs ===
- The Pains of Sleep (2005)
- Unveiling the Signs (2010)
- Kings Must Die (2024)

=== Demos ===
- 1000 Years (2001)
