= Subconscious Dissolution into the Continuum =

Subconscious Dissolution Into the Continuum

Studio album by Esoteric
- Released: 28 June 2004.
- Recorded: 2004, at Priory Recording Studios, Sutton Coldfield, Birmingham
- Genre: Doom metal
- Length: 50:57
- Label: Season of Mist
- Producer: Esoteric

Esoteric chronology
Metamorphogenesis (1999)	Subconscious Dissolution Into the Continuum (2004)	The Maniacal Vale (2008)

Professional ratings
Review scores
Source	Rating
Allmusic	review

Subconscious Dissolution Into the Continuum is the fourth studio album by the British doom metal band Esoteric. It was released on 28 June 2004 through Season of Mist records, and is engineered, mixed and mastered by Esoteric at Priory Recording Studios. Artwork by Chris Peters.

== Track listing ==
No.	Title	Length
1.	"Morphia"	15:56
2.	"The Blood of the Eyes"	12:38
3.	"Grey Day"	17:05
4.	"Arcane Dissolution"	5:18
Total length:		50:57

== Credits ==
- Gordon Bicknell -- Guitar
- Greg Chandler -- vocals, guitar
- Steve Peters -- Guitar, bass guitar
- Keith York -- drums
- Trevor Lines -- Session bass guitar
