= Colloquio =

Experimental-songwriter band

- Origin: Bologna, Italy
- Genres: Experimental-songwriter
- Years active: 1993 – Present
- Labels: Eibon Records
- Members: Gianni Pedretti (vocals, piano, synth); Sergio Calzoni (synth, sound-design)
- Website: http://www.colloquio.eu

Colloquio is an experimental-songwriter band founded in 1993 by Gianni Pedretti in Bologna, Italy. As its main singer, songwriter, and instrumentalist, Pedretti is the only official member of Colloquio and remains solely responsible for its musical direction. Colloquio's music is a blend of experimental, electronic arrangements with the Italian lyrics of Pedretti always in the foreground.

== Band members ==
- Gianni Pedretti - vocals, piano, synthesizer
- Sergio Calzoni - synthesizer, sound-design

Guest Musicians

- Stefano Nieri - guitars
- Stefano Castrucci - guitars
- Stefano Lambertini - sound engineer
- Matteo Mattioli - synthesizer, drum-programming

== Discography ==
Tapes

- "Il giardino delle lacrime" (1993)
- "Inferno" (1994)
- "Le dolci carezze della tristezza" (1994)
- "Lettere a una tessitrice d'ombra" (1995 - split with Menarca)
- "Io e l'altro" (1995)

Albums

- "...e lo spettacolo continua" (1997 - self produced)
- "Va tutto bene" (2001 - Eibon Records)
- "Si muove e ride" (2007 - Eibon Records)
- "L'entrata - L'uscita" (2013 - Eibon Records)

Compilations

- "Dissolution Fahrenheit" (1997 - Eibon Records/L'Alternative Dramatique)
- "Intimations of Immortalità Vol 4" (2003 - Energeia - featuring the track "Metamorfosi")

Soundtracks

- "Mondo Boiazzo" (1996 - featuring the track "Cisti")

Other works / Collaborations

- Alma Mater "Il parco degli arcobaleni" (1997 - Toast Records - Pedretti sings in the eponymous title-track)
- Canaan "A calling to weakness" (2002 - Eibon Records - Pedretti sings in "Un ultimo patetico addio" and "Essere nulla")
- Canaan "The unsaid words" (2005 - Eibon Records - Pedretti sings in "Il rimpianto" and "Senza una risposta")
- Neronoia "Un mondo in me" (2006 - Eibon Records)
- Neronoia "Il rumore delle cose" (2008 - Eibon Records)
