= Paragon of Dissonance =

Studio album by Esoteric
- Released: 11 November 2011
- Recorded: May–June 2011
- Venue: London, England
- Studio: Priory Recording Studios
- Genre: Doom metal
- Length: 90:18
- Label: Season of Mist
- Producer: Esoteric

Esoteric chronology
| The Maniacal Vale (2008) | Paragon of Dissonance (2011) | A Pyrrhic Existence (2019) |

Professional ratings
Review scores
| Source | Rating |
|---|---|
| Sputnikmusic | 4.5/5 stars |

Paragon of Dissonance is the sixth studio album by the British doom metal band Esoteric. It is a double album and was released in 2011 through Season of Mist Records. A two-disc vinyl edition of the album was released through Finnish label Svart Records on 25 April 2012.

For unknown reasons, long-time guitarist Gordon Bicknell temporarily left the group early during the recording sessions, the only track that features Bicknell is "Non Being". The majority of the album was written between Greg Chandler, Gordon Bicknell, and Jim Nolan.

== Track listing ==
Disc one
| No. | Title | Writer(s) | Length |
|---|---|---|---|
| 1. | "Abandonment" | Chandler, Nolan | 13:34 |
| 2. | "Loss of Will" | Chandler | 7:05 |
| 3. | "Cipher" | Nolan, Bodossian | 9:15 |
| 4. | "Non Being" | Bicknell, Chandler | 15:30 |
| Total length: | | | 45:24 |

Disc two
| No. | Title | Writer(s) | Length |
|---|---|---|---|
| 1. | "Aberration" | Chandler | 15:44 |
| 2. | "Disconsolate" | Chandler, Nolan | 15:33 |
| 3. | "Torrent of Ills" | Chandler | 13:37 |
| Total length: | | | 44:54; Total; 90:18 |

== Credits ==
- Greg Chandler – vocals, guitar, engineer, keys, mastering, mixing, engineering
- Gordon Bicknell – guitar, keyboard
- Mark Bodossian – bass guitar
- Joe Fletcher – drums
- Jim Nolan – guitar
- Mark Lockett – piano
- Mauro Berchi – graphics, layout
- Kati Astraeir – artwork
