= Kauan =

Russian atmospheric doom metal/post-rock band

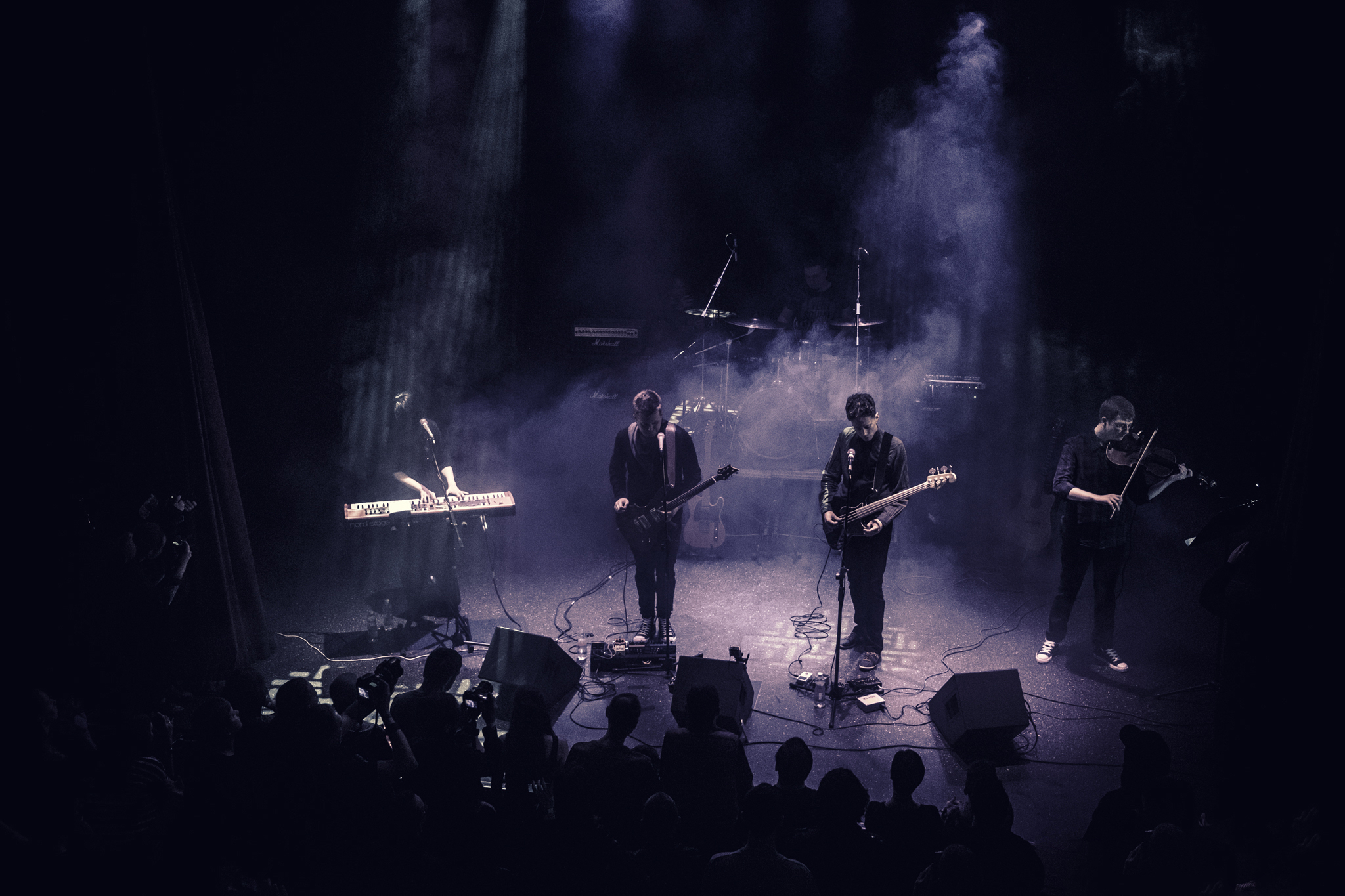
- Kauan playing live in Kyiv, Ukraine in 2017

Background information
- Origin: Chelyabinsk, Russia
- Genres: Folk metal, doom metal, ambient, post-rock, neofolk
- Years active: 2005–present
- Labels: BadMoodMan Music, Firebox Records, Avantgarde Music, Blood Music, Artoffact Records
- Members: Anton Belov; Alina Belova; Helena Dumell; Niko Salminen; Kristian Merilahti
- Past members: Alexander Borovikh; Lubov Mushnikova; Alexander Vynogradoff; Anton Skrynnik; Anatoly Gavrylov
- Website: Official homepage

Kauan is an atmospheric doom metal/post-rock band from Chelyabinsk, Russia, formed in 2005.

Kauan's name stems from the Finnish language, meaning for a long time, and many of the band's lyrics are in Finnish. The band moved to Finland in 2022 and is based in Helsinki.

== History ==
Kauan was formed by Anton Belov (formerly of Helengard) in February 2005. At the beginning, their sound was a blend of folk metal, black metal and doom metal.

In September 2006, Lyubov Mushnikova joined the band on violin. Guitarist Alexander Borovikh joined prior to the recording of their debut album, Lumikuuro, released 4 August 2007 by BadMoodMan Music.

Borovikh left the band prior to the recording of their second album, Tietäjän laulu, which was released by BadMoodMan Music on 30 November 2008. The album incorporated ambient and post-rock elements.

Kauan released their third album, Aava tuulen maa, on 18 November 2009 on Firebox Records/BadMoodMan Music. By that point, the band's genre had evolved to a melancholic mixture of atmospheric neofolk and post-rock.

In 2010, Belov and his wife, vocalist Alina "Witch_A" Belova (formerly of Inferno and Semargl), released a full-length album on Firebox Records with his other project Helengard.

On 26 June 2011, Kauan's fourth album, Kuu.., was released by Avantgarde Music. The album featured a strong post-rock/ambient sound with elements of doom metal. Mushnikova left the band later in 2011.

Belov assembled a full band lineup in 2013, including Belova as keyboardist as well as bassist Alex Vynogradoff (also of Vin De Mia Trix), viola player Anatoly Gavrylov and drummer Anton Skrynnik (ex-Dimicandum). This lineup performed on Kauan's fifth album, Pirut, released by Blood Music on 15 December 2013. That same year, the band self-released a digital compilation box set, Private Release, reissued in part in 2014 as Muistumia by Blood Music.

The next Kauan studio album, Sorni Nai, was streamed on 15 October 2015, and released on 20 October. A concept album consisting of one continuous song sectioned as seven tracks, it explored the mysterious 1959 Dyatlov Pass incident.

The band's seventh studio album, Kaiho, was released 22 September 2017. It featured lyrics by Finnish folk singer Marja Mattlar.

Kauan's eighth studio album, Ice Fleet, was released on 9 April 2021.

Between 2021 and 2022, Kauan released three live albums Sorni Nai live, Pirut live and Lumikuuro live. All three have been recorded in the band's live performance in Kyiv, Ukraine in 2017.

Kauan released ATM Revised on 24 February 2023. The album is a reimagination of Aava tuulen maa, fully remixed and remastered with the original sample based drums and bass guitar replaced by real instruments.

Kauan relocated to Finland in 2021 and announced a new lineup in 2024, with bassist Niko Salminen, drummer Kristian Merilahti and violist Helena Dumell.

== Other projects ==
In 2016, Belov announced that he had also joined as a member of Vynogradoff's project A Noend of Mine.

Anton Belov had an interview with Ruard Veltmaat of Progwereld in August 2020.

== Members ==
=== Current members ===
- Anton Belov – composer, vocals (2005–present), guitar, keyboards, programming (2005–2013)
- Alina Belova – keyboards, backing vocals (2013–present)
- Helena Dumell - viola (2024-present)
- Niko Salminen - bass guitar (2024–present)
- Kristian Merilahti - drums (2024–present)

=== Former members ===
- Alexander Borovikh – guitar, backing vocals, programming (2005-2008)
- Lyubov Mushnikova – violin (2006–2011)
- Alex Vynogradoff – bass guitar, backing vocals (2013–2024)
- Anton Skrynnik – drums (2013–2024)
- Anatoly Gavrylov – viola (2013–2024)

=== Live/Session members ===
- Igor Andrievskiy - violin (live 2013-present?)
- Maxim Rymar - cello (live 2013-present?)
- Vladimir Babutin - cello (live 2013-present?)
- Artur Andriasyan - keyboards, backing vocals (session 2007-2008)
- Astaroth Merc - guitar (session 2013)

== Discography ==
=== Studio albums ===
- Lumikuuro (2007, BadMoodMan Music)
- Tietäjän laulu (2008, BadMoodMan Music)
- Aava tuulen maa (2009, Firebox Records/BadMoodMan Music)
- Kuu.. (2011, Avantgarde Music)
- Pirut (2013, Blood Music)
- Sorni Nai (2015, Blood Music)
- Kaiho (2017, self-released)
- Ice Fleet (2021, Artoffact Records)
- ATM Revised (2023, Artoffact Records)
- Wayhome (2025, Artoffact Records)

=== Compilation albums ===
- Private Release digital box set (2013, self-released)
- Muistumia (2014, Blood Music)

=== Live albums ===
- Live 26.02.2016 (2017, self-released)
- Live 13 (2018, self-released)
- Sorni Nai live (2021, Artoffact Records)
- Pirut live (2022, Artoffact Records)
- Lumikuuro live (2022, Artoffact Records)

=== Selected compilation appearances ===
- "Vmesto Slez" on Der Wanderer über dem Nebelmeer (2010, Pest Productions)
