= Kuu.. =

Studio album by Kauan
- Released: June 26, 2011
- Genres: Post-rock, ambient, doom metal
- Length: 44:51
- Label: Avantgarde Music

Kauan chronology
Aava tuulen maa (2009)	Kuu.. (2011)	Pirut (2013)

Kuu.. is the fourth full-length album by Russian post-rock band Kauan, released on Avantgarde Music in 2011.

A reviewer from Teeth of the Divine described the album as "near perfection", adding that "you’d be ill-advised to skip this beautiful retreat."

== Track listing ==
1. "Tähtien hiljainen laulu" – 14:57
2. "Kauniin kuun sävelen" – 07:34
3. "Ikuinen junan kulku" – 10:35
4. "Suora liila sydänkäyrä" – 11:45

== Personnel ==
- Anton Belov – guitar, vocals, keyboards, programming
- Lubov Mushnikova – violin
