= Nocturnal Depression =

French metal band

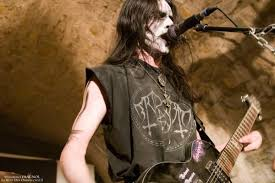
- Vocalist and guitarist Lord Lokhraed

Background information
- Origin: Grenoble, France
- Genres: Black-doom, depressive black metal
- Years active: 2004–present
- Labels: Sun & Moon; Avantgarde
- Members: Lord Lokhraed; Herr Suizid; Sattvahr
- Past members: Obeyron; Abalam; Morkhod; Krahne; Avskrius; V.

Nocturnal Depression is a French black-doom and depressive black metal band formed in 2004.

The name combines "nocturne", inspired by the classic music of Lully, Wagner and Chopin. And "depression" as an term to express of the states of mind of the processus of the band's music composing.

Founding lead vocalist and guitarist Lord Lokhraed suffers from ectrodactyly, having been born with only two fingers on his left hand.

The main influences of the band are Forgotten Tomb, Nargaroth and Burzum. The band has been accused of expressing National Socialist views, highlighted in 2020 when the "Darkness Guides Us" festival that they were due to perform at was cancelled. However the organisers denied extreme political agendas.

The band had made split albums with Psychonaut 4 (Georgia), Funeral RIP (France), Kaiserreich (Italy), Moloch (Ukraine).

The lyrics of the songs reveal extreme self-loathing, death and suicidal thoughts. The leader stated that they are not doing suicide propaganda and the writings are more a parallelism of feelings, observation of society and personal experiences. The band is inspired with poetry and literature, such as Baudelaire and Lovecraft.

The texts are mainly written in English, but the entire album "Spleen Black Metal" is written in French.

== Members ==
=== Current ===
- Lord Lokhraed – vocals, rhythm guitar (2004–present)
- Herr Suizid – guitar (2004–2012), bass, drums (2004–2012, 2019–present)
- Sattvahr – lead guitar, vocals (2022–present)

=== Past ===
- Obeyron – lead guitar (2006–2011)
- Abalam – guitar (2006–2007)
- Morkhod – bass (2006–?)
- Krahne – bass (2008–?)
- Avskrius – lead guitar (2010–2011, 2014–?)
- V. – guitar, vocals (2012–2014)

== Discography ==
=== Albums ===
- Nostalgia – Fragments of a Broken Past (2006)
- Soundtrack for a Suicide – Opus II (2007)
- Reflections of a Sad Soul (2008)
- The Cult of Negation (2010)
- Spleen Black Metal (2015)
- Deathcade (2017)
- Tides of Despair (2019)
- Perpétuelle éclipse (2024)

=== Demos ===
- Suicidal Thoughts (2004)
- Near to the Stars (2004)
- Soundtrack for a Suicide (2005)
- Fuck Off Parisian Black Metal Scene (2005)
- Four Seasons to a Depression (2006)
