= Ballet Deviare =

Ballet Deviare was founded in 2003 and is located in New York City. It was conceived by Laura Kowalewski and Andrew Carpenter. The company was noted for its use of heavy metal music. Classical dance styles are mixed with the music of such bands as Opeth, My Dying Bride, Swallow the Sun, Japanische Kampfhörspiele, and Celestiial. Segments with the band Arsis have been featured on Headbangers Ball.

Their second live production, Forged, was reviewed in Stylus magazine.
