= Transcendence into the Peripheral =

Transcendence Into the Peripheral

Studio album by Disembowelment
- Released: March 31st, 1993
- Recorded: 1992 at Toybox Studios, Melbourne, Australia
- Genre: Death-doom
- Length: 59:33
- Label: Relapse (U.S.)
- Producer: Disembowelment

Disembowelment chronology
Dusk (1992)	Transcendence Into the Peripheral (1993)	Disembowelment (2005)

Transcendence Into the Peripheral is the only studio album by Australian death-doom band Disembowelment. The album was originally released in 1993. In 2005, this album was included in its entirety as part of a double CD of all the band's recorded material.

== Track listing ==
No.	Title	Length
1.	"The Tree of Life and Death"	10:25
2.	"Your Prophetic Throne of Ivory"	7:40
3.	"Excoriate"	4:44
4.	"Nightside of Eden"	2:38
5.	"A Burial at Ornans"	14:38
6.	"The Spirits of the Tall Hills"	9:22
7.	"Cerulean Transience of All My Imagined Shores"	10:06
Total length:		59:33

== Personnel ==
=== Disembowelment ===
- Renato Gallina - vocals, guitar
- Jason Kells - guitar
- Paul Mazziotta - drums
- Matthew Skarajew - bass

=== Additional musicians ===
- Tony Mazziotta - double bass on "Cerulean Transience of All My Imagined Shores"
- I'da - vocals on "Nightside of Eden"
