= Tietäjän laulu =

Studio album by Kauan
- Released: June 26, 2008
- Genres: Post-rock, ambient, doom metal
- Length: 44:51
- Label: BadMoodMan Music

Kauan chronology
Lumikuuro (2007)	Tietäjän laulu (2008)	Aava tuulen maa (2009)

Tietäjän laulu (Finnish for "The Song of the Sage") is the second full-length album by Russian post-rock band Kauan, released on BadMoodMan Music in 2008.

== Track listing ==
1. "Vmesto slez" – 6:37
2. "Kyynelten sijaan" – 09:25
3. "Pesnja materi" – 06:01
4. "Äidin laulu" – 12:02
5. "Prozrachni cvetok" – 8:12
6. "Orkidea" – 10:34

== Personnel ==
- Anton Belov – guitar, vocals, keyboards, programming
- Lubov Mushnikova – violin
- Mihail Korotkov – bagpipes
- Artur Andriasän – keyboards
- Tyurgan Kam – tambourine, vocals
- Katerina Ershova – vocals
