= Tears from a Grieving Heart =

Studio album by Mournful Congregation
- Released: 1999 (original), September 12, 2012 (CD)
- Recorded: 1997–98
- Genre: Funeral doom metal
- Length: 45:07
- Label: Independent
- Producer: Mournful Congregation, Steve Fieldhouse

Mournful Congregation chronology
An Epic Dream of Desire (demo) (1995)	Tears from a Grieving Heart (1999)	The Dawning of Mournful Hymns (compilation)

Tears from a Grieving Heart is the debut studio album by the Australian doom metal band Mournful Congregation. It is regarded as a pioneering release in the funeral doom subgenre. It was originally recorded as a demo but was re-released as a CD in September 2012 by American record label 20 Buck Spin, with a slightly altered track listing and a bonus track. The band has stated in interviews that it is their first full-length album. It is also the final Mournful Congregation release to be recorded as a duo and the first to feature drummer Adrian Bickle, after the departure of band co-founder Ben Petch the previous year following the An Epic Dream of Desire demo, although he has writing credits on this record.

== Track listing ==
=== Original version ===
All tracks are written by Damon Good, except where noted.

No.	Title	Length
1.	"Skyward Gaze, Earthward Touch"	9:41
2.	"Opal of the Stream Beneath the Hills" (Damon Good, Ben Petch)	13:10
3.	"Elemental" (instrumental)	0:53
4.	"Remembrance of the Transcending Moon" (Damon Good, Ben Petch)	11:21
5.	"Tears from a Grieving Heart" (Damon Good, Ben Petch)	10:02
Total length:		45:07

=== CD version ===
All tracks are written by Damon Good, except where noted.

No.	Title	Length
1.	"Skyward Gaze, Earthward Touch"	9:41
2.	"Remembrance of the Transcending Moon" (Damon Good, Ben Petch)	11:21
3.	"Empirical Choirs"	7:26
4.	"Tears from a Grieving Heart" (Damon Good, Ben Petch)	10:02
5.	"Opal of the Stream Beneath the Hills" (Damon Good, Ben Petch)	13:10
6.	"Elemental" (instrumental)	0:53
Total length:		52:33

== Personnel ==
Mournful Congregation

- Damon Good – Vocals, guitar, bass guitar
- Adrian Bickle – Drums

Additional personnel

- Ben Petch – songwriting
- Anne O'Neill – cover art
- Pat di Palo – layout
- Steve Fieldhouse – mixing, mastering
