= Vargtimmen Pt. 2: Ominous Insomnia =

Studio album by Wyrd
- Released: 17 April 2004
- Recorded: 2004
- Genre: Black metal, pagan metal
- Length: 53:49
- Label: Solistitium Records
- Producer: Narqath

Wyrd chronology
Vargtimmen Pt. 1: The Inmost Night (2003)	Vargtimmen Pt. 2: Ominous Insomnia (2004)	Rota (2005)

Vargtimmen Pt. 2: Ominous Insomnia is the fourth album by Wyrd, released in 2004 by Solistitium Records.

Re-released in 2006 by Omvina with different artwork.

== Track listing ==
	Title	Writers	Length
1.	"The Wicker Man"	Narqath	13:07
2.	"The Pale and the Dead"	Narqath	6:35
3.	"Redemption"	Narqath	2:00
4.	"Ominous Insomnia"	Narqath	7:24
5.	"Cold, Son of the Wind"	Narqath	9:19
6.	"Ghost of Winter"	Narqath	6:41
7.	"Deception"	Narqath	8:43

== Credits ==
- Narqath – All Instruments and Vocals
