= Mournful Congregation =

Australian funeral doom band

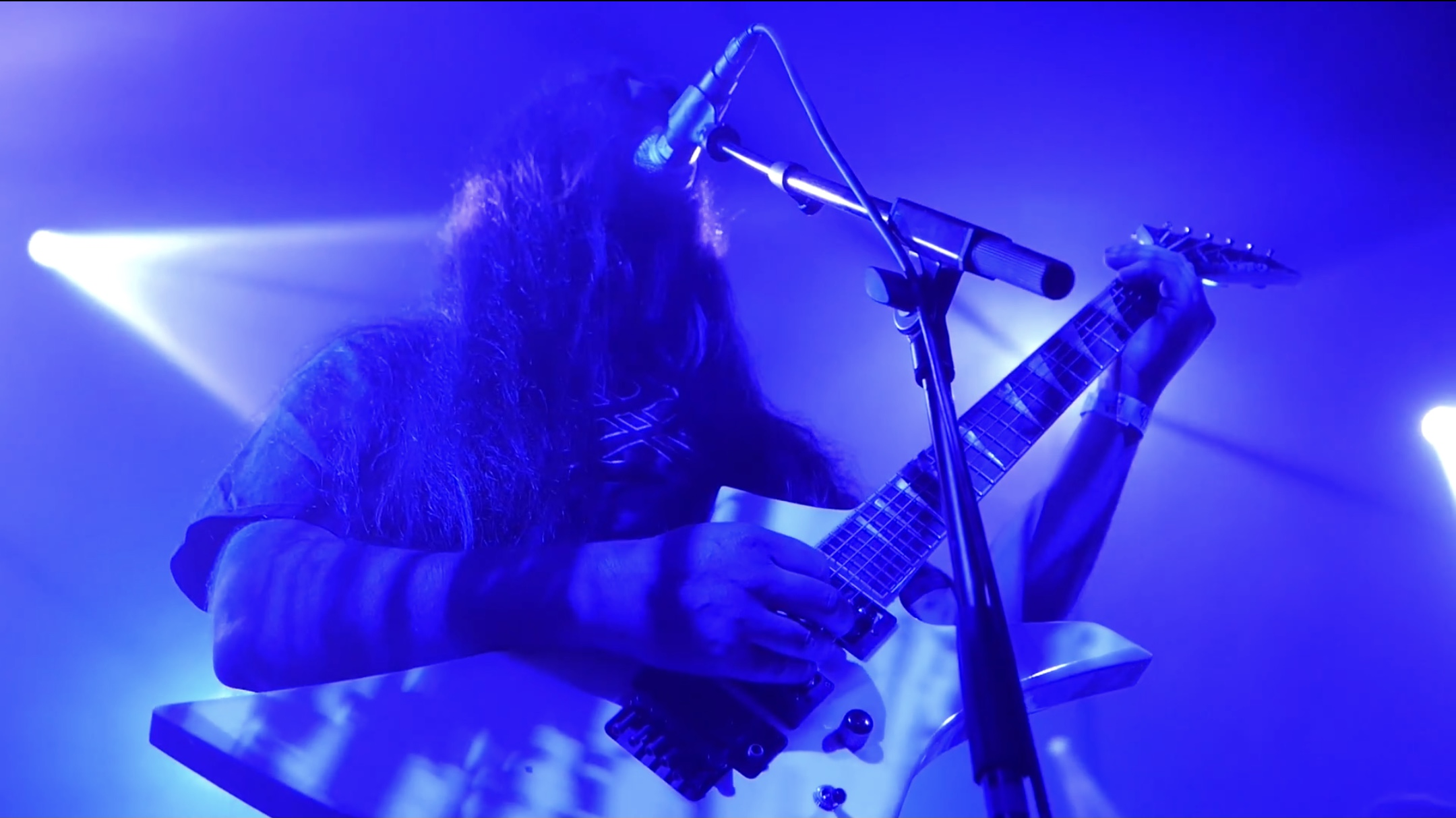
- Damon Good performing with Mournful Congregation at Netherlands Deathfest III, 4 March 2018

Background information
- Origin: Adelaide, South Australia, Australia
- Genre: Funeral doom
- Years active: 1993–present
- Labels: Osmose; Weird Truth; 20 Buck Spin; Obsidian; Painiac; Ostra
- Members: Damon Good; Justin Hartwig; Ben Petch; Ben Newsome; Tim Call
- Past members: Adrian Bickle; Stuart Prickett; Nick Hansen; Sean Graetz; Mark Bodossian; Denny Blake

Mournful Congregation are an Australian funeral doom metal band from Adelaide, South Australia, which was founded in 1993, and has included members of Chalice, Cauldron Black Ram and Esoteric.

== History ==
=== Beginnings (1993–2009) ===
During the 1990s the band released three demos; the last of these Tears From A Grieving Heart was re-released on vinyl in 2001. All of the band's demo releases were included, alongside their side of the split single with Worship, The Epitome of Gods and Men Alike, on the double CD The Dawning of Mournful Hymns released in 2002. Another 7" split single with the band Stabat Mater, A Slow March to the Burial, was released in 2004. 2005 saw the release of the band's first LP release The Monad of Creation. Despite the LP's release date, some of the material dates back to the band's earliest period of recordings in 1994. In 2009, the band performed live for the first time in their fifteen-year existence. They played four Australian shows, followed up by a further 17 shows throughout Europe to promote their album The June Frost, released that year.

=== Compilations and The Book of Kings (2011–2018) ===
The group issued a compilation album, The Unspoken Hymns, in September 2011. Mathias Bloodaxe of VoltageMedia felt it has "some of Mournful Congregation's best work... it is aimed at introducing one of Australia's best bands onto American audiences. The compilation features songs [and versions of songs] only previously available on long sold out limited vinyl splits, and being someone who generally loathes best of compilations, I find this a very worthy release."

Their fourth studio album, The Book of Kings, followed in November 2011 via Obsidian Records. MichaelO'Brien of The Metal Forge rated the album at 9.5 out-of ten he explained that they had "A mature and damn near flawless album... [and] reaffirmed their place within the upper tier of the doom genre with what is easily their best and most mature work to date." They undertook a tour of the United States west coast.

Mournful Congregation's fifth album The Incubus of Karma was released on 23 March 2018.

== Members ==
=== Current ===
- Damon Good – vocals, guitar (1993–present), bass (1993–2000, 2000–2008)
- Justin Hartwig – guitar (1999–present)
- Ben Petch – guitar, drums, vocals (1993–1996), guitar (2008-2011, 2017-present)
- Ben Newsome – bass (2008–present)
- Tim Call – drums (2015–present)

=== Former ===
- Adrian Bickle – drums (1997–2003, 2004-2015)
- Stuart Prickett – guitar live (2011–2016)
- Sean Graetz – guitar (2000)
- Mark Bodossian – bass (2000)
- Denny Blake – drums (2003)

== Discography ==
=== Demos ===
- Weeping (1994)
- An Epic Dream of Desire (1995)

=== Split albums ===
- Let There Be Doom... / The Epitome of Gods and Men Alike (2002-with Worship)
- A Slow March to the Burial (2004-with Stabat Mater)
- Ascent of the Flames / Descent of the Flames (2007-with Stone Wings)
- Four Burials (2008-with Otesanek, Loss, and Orthodox)

=== Studio albums ===
- Tears from a Grieving Heart (1999)
- The Monad of Creation (2005)
- The June Frost (2009)
- The Book of Kings (2011)
- The Incubus of Karma (2018)

=== Compilation albums ===
- The Dawning of Mournful Hymns (2002)
- The Unspoken Hymns (20 September 2011)
- Weeping/An Epic Dream of Desire (2012)

=== Extended plays ===
- Concrescence of the Sophia (2014)
- The Exuviae of Gods, Part I (2022)
- The Exuviae of Gods, Part II (2023)
