= Avantgarde Music =

Italian record label

- Founded: 1990 (as Obscure Plasma Records); 1994 (as Avantgarde Music)
- Genre: Black metal, death metal, doom metal
- Country of origin: Italy
- Location: Milan
- Official website: avantgardemusic.com

Avantgarde Music is an Italian record label, formed as a continuation of Obscure Plasma Records, focusing on black and doom metal artists. The label had a sub-label called Wounded Love Records, which has released albums by Dolorian and Taake. A new sub-label, Flowing Downward, had been founded in 2018, specializing in atmospheric black metal bands specifically.

Avantgarde Music's first release was the 1994 funeral doom classic Stream from the Heavens by Thergothon. The label has since signed many well-known black, death and doom metal bands such as Behemoth, Carpathian Forest, Mayhem and Unholy.

== Bands ==
- Abigor
- Ad Hominem
- Alternative 4
- Ancient Wisdom
- Ashbringer
- Astarte
- Azaghal
- Beatrik
- Behemoth
- Carpathian Forest
- Dark Sanctuary
- Darkspace
- Death SS
- Den Saakaldte
- Diabolical Masquerade
- Dystopia Nå!
- Dødheimsgard
- Dolorian
- Downfall of Nur
- Drought
- Dzö-nga
- Enochian Crescent
- Eternity
- Evoken
- Forgotten Tomb
- Godkiller
- Grey
- Great Cold Emptiness
- Katatonia
- Kauan
- Keep of Kalessin
- Laburinthos
- Lifelover
- Mayhem
- Mesarthim
- Mortuary Drape
- Mysticum
- Necrodeath
- Nehëmah
- Nocternity
- Nocturnal Depression
- Nortt
- Novembers Doom
- Obtained Enslavement
- Opera IX
- Pan.Thy.Monium
- Saor
- Shade Empire
- Shining
- Sojourner
- Solefald
- Sordide
- Taake
- Thergothon
- This Empty Flow
- Throes of Dawn
- Tormentor
- Towards Darkness
- Ulver
- Unholy
- Vials of Wrath
- Windfaerer
- Winds
- Wode
- Wolvencrown
- Wyrd
