= Beyond Dawn =

Norwegian band

- Origin: Norway
- Genres: Avant-garde metal, doom metal (early); Alternative rock, electropop (later)
- Years active: 1990–2003
- Members: Espen Ingierd; Petter Haavik; Tore Gjedrem; Einar Sjursø
- Website: http://www.beyonddawn.com

Beyond Dawn was a Norwegian avant-garde metal band turned electropop composed of Espen Ingierd, Petter Haavik, Tore Gjedrem, and Einar Sjursø. They are described on their official website as "Norway's Best & Least Selling Act". After two demo tapes in 1990 and 1991, the band were picked up by French label Adipocere Records, which made possible the band's first two commercial releases, 1993's Up Through the Linear Shades 7" and 1994's Longing for Scarlet Days EP. In 1995, Beyond Dawn released their critically acclaimed full-length debut Pity Love on Candlelight Records. It received a 4.0 rating from Sputnikmusic. Soon after, the band began work on an album intended to be a departure from the doom metal music they were becoming known for, but their record label was less than pleased with the band's drastic change in sound and they were soon in search of a new label. They eventually signed with Misanthropy Records and released Revelry in 1998 to more critical praise. Beyond Dawn eventually resumed work on the would-be 1996 album and, after adding additional material and overdubs, released In Reverie in 1999 on Eibon Records, which would also be reissued in 2005 with two bonus tracks. During the latter half of 1999, they released Electric Sulking Machine on the Peaceville label, which soon became a favorite amongst fans and remains sought after due to its limited pressing.

During the span of their career, Beyond Dawn's sound has gradually evolved from the doom metal present on their early releases to the minimalistic electropop present on the band's 2003 release, Frysh. In addition to this, the trombone, which was a core part of Beyond Dawn's sound on nearly all of their 1990s works, is not featured on their later output. Due to the limited commercial success of Frysh, the band went on hiatus in 2003 to focus on other projects. Some time later, several tracks from Frysh were remixed by various electronic and EBM artists and released in the form of the double LP We're Down with Species of Any Kind in 2005. Currently, the band remains on an indefinite hiatus.

== Discography ==
Studio albums

- Pity Love (1995)
- Revelry (1998)
- In Reverie (1999)
- Electric Sulking Machine (1999)
- Frysh (2003)
- We're Down with Species of Any Kind (2005)

Extended plays

- Up Through the Linear Shades (1993)
- Longing for Scarlet Days (1994)

Demos

- Tales from an Extinguished World (1990)
- Heaven's Dark Reflection (1991)
- Thorns in the Eyes of the Chosen (1994)

== Band members ==
Final lineup

- Tore Gjedrem – bass guitar, vocals, sampling (1990–2003)
- Petter HaavikPetter Haavik – guitars, sampling, programming, keyboards (1990–2003)
- Espen Ingierd – lead vocals, guitars, programming (1992–2003)
- Einar Sjursø (Virus, Ved Buens Ende) – drums, percussion (1990–2003)

Former members

- Sindre Goksöyr – guitars (1990–1992)
- Dag Midbrød – trombone, keyboards (1993–1997, 1999)
