= Vargtimmen Pt. 1: The Inmost Night =

Studio album by Wyrd
- Released: 30 June 2003
- Recorded: 2003
- Genre: Black metal, pagan metal
- Length: 48:38
- Label: Solistitium Records

Wyrd chronology
Huldrafolk (2002)	Vargtimmen Pt. 1: The Inmost Night (2003)	Vargtimmen Pt. 2: Ominous Insomnia (2004)

Vargtimmen Pt. 1: The Inmost Night is the third album by Wyrd, released in 2003 by Solistitium Records.

Vargtimmen is Swedish for "The Hour of the Wolf", Re-released with new artwork in 2005 by Omvina.

== Track listing ==
	Title	Length
1.	"The Lonely Sea"	12:40
2.	"Autumn"	5:19
3.	"Vargtimmen"	8:11
4.	"Sad Song of the Woods"	17:28
5.	"Outro"	4:54

== Credits ==
- Narqath – All music, lyrics, instruments and vocals
