= Eibon Records =

Eibon Records is an independent record label from Milan, Italy, founded in 1996. It is owned by Mauro Berchi and primarily focuses on very fringe underground music, noise/ambient and doom metal (the former especially). It is also home to Berchi's own dark ambient group, Canaan. Other acts to have released albums through Eibon Records include Thergothon, This Empty Flow, Nothing, While Heaven Wept, Colloquio, Esoteric, Act Noir, and Beyond Dawn.

== Bands having released albums on Eibon Records ==
- Act Noir
- Alison Wait
- Amon (Never Known)
- Asianova
- Bad Sector
- Bestia Centauri
- Beyond Dawn
- Blood Box
- The Blue Project
- Canaan
- Carlo Baja Guarienti
- Caul
- Cazzodio
- Circadian
- Colloquio
- Control
- A Crown of Light
- Cultro
- Devar
- Ending
- En Nihil
- Esoteric
- Fire in the Head
- First Human Ferro
- The Frozen Autumn (Static Movement)
- Gruntsplatter
- Carlo Baja Guarienti
- Hall of Mirrors
- The Human Voice
- IAM.
- Ignis Fatuus
- Kave
- Kkoagulaa
- Konau
- Luasa Raelon
- Maath
- Melanchoholics
- Moljebka Pvlse
- Mondrian Oak
- Mourmansk 150
- Murder Corporation (Mortar)
- Navicon Torture Technologies
- Naxal Protocol
- Nazca
- Neronoia
- Nimh
- No Festival of Light
- Nordvargr
- Nothing
- Olhon
- Ordeal
- Orghanon
- Parade of Souls
- Ras Algethi
- Reutoff
- Russian Love
- Selaxon Lutberg
- Kenji Siratori
- SKM-ETR
- Slogun
- Slow
- Sola Translatio
- Striations
- Svartsinn
- Teresa 11
- Thergothon
- This Empty Flow
- True Colour of Blood
- Vanessa Van Basten
- Wanda Wulz
- Weltschmerz
- Where
- While Heaven Wept

== See also ==
- List of record labels
