= The Ghost Album =

Studio album by Wyrd
- Released: 30 January 2006
- Recorded: 2006
- Genre: Pagan Black Metal
- Length: 38:12
- Label: Omvina Records
- Producer: Narqath

Wyrd chronology
Rota (2005)	The Ghost Album (2006)	Kammen (2007)

The Ghost Album is the sixth album by Wyrd, released in 2006 by Omvina Records.

== Track listing ==
	Title	Writers	Length
1.	"My Ghosts"	Narqath	7:23
2.	"Daughter of the Forest"	Narqath	5:59
3.	"They"	Narqath	7:18
4.	"Daylight Dies"	Narqath	5:26
5.	"Dark Water"	Narqath	12:06

== Credits ==
- Narqath – vocals, guitars and bass.
- JL Nokturnal - drums.
