= Lumikuuro =

Studio album by Kauan
- Released: April 8, 2007
- Genre: Folk metal, black metal, doom metal
- Length: 43:02
- Label: BadMoodMan Music

Kauan chronology
Lumikuuro (2007)	Tietäjän laulu (2008)

Lumikuuro is the first full-length album by Russian doom metal/post-rock band Kauan, released in 2007 on the BadMoodMan Music label.

== Track listing ==
1. "Alku" – 02:08
2. "Aamu ja kaste" – 07:01
3. "Lumikuuro" – 07:28
4. "Savu" – 04:11
5. "Koivun elämä" – 06:27
6. "Syleilyn sumu" – 05:14
7. "Villiruusu" – 05:17
8. "Syleilyn sumu (acoustic)" – 05:11

== Personnel ==
- Anton Belov – guitar, vocals, keyboards, programming
- Lubov Mushnikova – violin
- Alexander Borovikh – guitar, backing vocals
