= Vanessa Van Basten =

Italian musical duo

- Origin: Genova, Italy
- Genres: Post-metal
- Years active: 2003–present
- Labels: Robotic Empire
- Members: Morgan Bellini
- Past members: Stefano Parodi; Roberto Dellarocca; NANT
- Website: vanessavanbasten.tumblr.com

Vanessa Van Basten is an Italian duo with various guests and contributors from the alternative and extreme Italian underground scene. They make slow, heavy, metaphysical instrumental music. Their influences are cosmic psychedelia, industrial rock (like Swans or Godflesh), Neurot & Hydrahead catalogue, old 4AD bands, krautrock, Norwegian black metal. They are currently on Robotic Empire records.

== Members ==
- Morgan Bellini – guitars, synth, sampler, sequencer, mic, software, fx, harmonica, glockenspiel, percussions (2002–present)

=== Former members ===
- Stefano Parodi: bass, synth
- Roberto Dellarocca: live drums
- NANT: Korg MS20, live drones

== Discography ==
- Vanessa Van Basten EP (2005)
- La Stanza di Swedenborg (2007)
- Psygnosis EP (2008)
- Closer to the Small/Dark/Door (2012)
- Disintegration EP (2015)
