= Disembowelment (band) =

Australian death-doom band

- Origin: Melbourne, Victoria, Australia
- Genre: Death-doom
- Years active: 1989–1993
- Label: Relapse
- Past members: Renato Gallina; Paul Mazziotta; Jason Kells; Matthew Skarajew

Disembowelment, often styled as diSEMBOWELMENT, were an Australian death-doom band formed in November 1989, featuring Renato Gallina on guitar and vocals, and drummer Paul Mazziotta. In early 1991, lead guitarist Jason Kells joined, and bassist Matthew Skarajew completed the line-up at the end of that year. In 1992, they issued the EP Dusk on Relapse Records, and followed with a studio album, Transcendence into the Peripheral, the next year. They disbanded shortly after, never having performed live. AllMusic's Eduardo Rivadavia described them as "[s]till revered in underground circles as doom-grind pioneers ... [their works] remain genre classics".

== History ==
Disembowelment formed in Melbourne in November 1989 from the demise of two-piece grind band Bacteria, featuring Renato Gallina on guitar and vocals and drummer Paul Mazziotta. With Dean Ruprich from Melbourne death/grind band Necrotomy providing session bass guitar, the band released its first demo, Mourning September in September 1990. Disembowelment played a slow form of doom with occasional bursts of speed that relied on the atmospheric effects of droning guitars and constant riffing. The band was known for its atmospheric chanting, slow riffs and spiritual dark elements in their symphonic, distorted style. They are often credited with spawning the funeral doom movement that developed years later.

In 1991, Jason Kells joined the band on lead guitar. The song "Extracted Nails" was recorded in April 1991 at Double Tea Studios for a compilation on the German label Mangled Beyond Recognition, released the following year. The compilation featured Therion, God Macabre, Rottrevore, Cadaver, Crematory, Pan.Thy.Monium, Cenotaph, and Hydr Hydr. On 3–4 August 1991, the band went back to Double Tea studios to record their second demo, Deep Sensory Perception into Aural Fate. This recording was a step forward in songwriting, performance, and overall production. The demo drew the interest of Relapse Records, who signed them up and released the demo as the Dusk extended play in 1992. It was an edited version of the demo that omitted the linking piece of music between the two tracks. It included the first recorded version of "Cerulean Transience of all My Imagined Shores", a third track not featured on the earlier demo.

At the end of 1991, bassist Matthew Skarajew (ex-Sanctum, lead guitar) joined the group, and they recorded "Cerulean Transience of all My Imagined Shores" the following year. Initially a full-time bass guitarist for his early sessions, he later added guitar work (acoustic and melodic). In 1993, Disembowelment released their debut studio album, Transcendence into the Peripheral, which featured slow drumming, death metal vocals, and chants and passages of dark ambience. Disembowelment split up after the album's release. Before breaking up, they had mentioned the possibility of a one-off live show that "would be an event, a unique concert". However, it never transpired. At the time, they had rehearsed and prepared five cover versions for a potential EP. "Slaughtered Remains" (a cover of a Necrovore track) was a demo track that appeared in 2005 on a bonus disc of the limited release of Disembowelment compilation. This featured Mazziotta on drums, Skarajew on guitars and Gallina layered a new vocal track onto it three years later.

Allmusic's Eduardo Rivadavia described Disembowelment as "[s]till revered in underground circles as doom-grind pioneers ... [their works] remain genre classics". Justin Donnelly of Metal Forge declared they were "the legendary unground [sic] Australian doom/grindcore/ambient act" and "often referred to as merely a doom band, the sort of music ... is actually far more than eclectic and broad sounding than simply labelling them to one particular genre".

Gallina and Skarajew continued working together in the ethno ambient act Trial of the Bow, which Skarajew had started during his time in Disembowelment. The group released an EP, Ornamentation, and an album, Rite of Passage, to critical approval, notably Rolling Stone and Wired Magazine. Trial of the Bow was licensed to Rykodisc soon after. From 2004, Skarajew and Mazziotta formed a grind band, Pulgar. In October 2005, Disembowelment's catalogue was re-released as a double and limited edition triple CD, Disembowelment by Relapse Records. Two different limited edition vinyl box sets were later released. A related band, d.USK, formed in 2010 with original Disembowelment members Skarajew and Mazziotta and played some their former group's material as a live band. In late 2011 d.USK split and re-emerged under the name Inverloch, which plays a different form of death/doom than Disembowelment and d.USK.

In 2019, Renato revisited the track "Nightside of Eden" gifting it to the forum Doom-Metal.com. The track was released alongside a statement and digital download links for both WAV and mp3 formats.

In 2019, Renato Gallina, the founder behind Australian death/doom band, Disembowelment, felt a powerful urge to re-visit the track, Nightside of Eden, which was featured on their one and only album, 'Transcendence into The Peripheral'. Gallina was always incredibly dissatisfied with this version and stated that it 'was the weakest and most regretful moment on the album'. Almost 3 decades later, the track has been re-contextualised and is finally true to how it was originally meant to sound.

2020 saw the limited repressing of "Transcendence into the Peripheral" and the release of "Dusk / Deep Sensory Procession into Aural Fate" under Relapse Records, which combined Disembowelment's only EP and a remaster of their second demo.

== Discography ==
- Mourning September (Demo, 1990)
- Deep Sensory Procession into Aural Fate (Demo, 1991)
- Dusk (EP, 1992)
- Transcendence into the Peripheral (studio, 1993)
- Disembowelment (2×CD/3×CD compilation, 2005)
- Dusk / Deep Sensory Procession into Aural Fate (2xLP Compilation, 2020)
