= Azaghal (band) =

Finnish black metal band

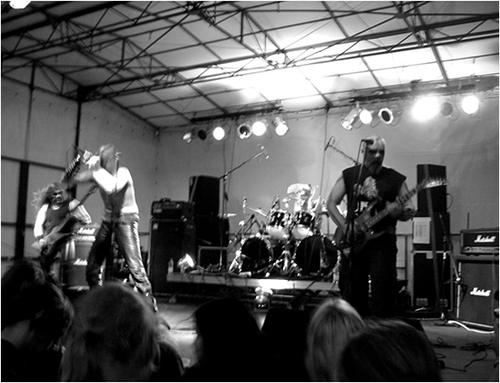
- Azaghal live at Under the Black Sun Festival, Germany (2004)

Background information
- Origin: Hyvinkää, Finland
- Genres: Black metal
- Years active: 1995-present
- Label: Moribund Cult Records
- Members: Narqath; Ruho; Lima; Niflungr
- Past members: Varjoherra; T.M. Blastbeast
- Website: Blackterrormetal.fi

Azaghal is a Finnish black metal band, currently signed to Moribund Records. They were established in 1995.

== History ==
Azaghal was formed in 1995 by guitarist Narqath and drummer Kalma (later known as Vrtx and V-Khaoz). Varjoherra joined the band as a vocalist in 1997, and their first demo was recorded shortly after that in late 1997. Two more demos, Noituuden Torni and Kristinusko Liekeissä were recorded in 1998, as well as their debut 7-inch EP Harmagedon, released by Aftermath Music.

Their debut full-length record Mustamaa was released in Summer 1999 by Melancholy Productions (later known as ISO666). The album was originally released only on limited vinyl (300 copies), but was later re-released on CD by ISO666. Just a few months later, their second full-length album was recorded, entitled Helvetin Yhdeksän Piiriä. The first two albums featured mostly re-recorded demo material, hence the short time between the recordings and releases. Helvetin Yhdeksän Piiriä came out on Brazilian label Evil Horde Records in December 1999. The year 2000 saw the release of a couple of split CDs, Helwettiläinen 7-inch and Deathkult MMDCLXVI, a collection of rare and demo tracks. Azaghal tracks from the two split CDs (with Mustan Kuun Lapset and Beheaded Lamb) were also released on 12-inch vinyl called Ihmisviha by Blut & Eisen. In early 2001 JL Nokturnal (who had appeared on most of the earlier releases as a session musician) joined Azaghal as a lead guitarist/bassist and they recorded their third full-length album Of Beasts and Vultures in March 2001. After some delays, Of Beasts and Vultures was finally released over a year later in Spring 2002. After this album founding member and drummer V-Khaoz was fired from the band because he was not considered to share the other members' passion for black metal and Azaghal.

In 2002-2003, Azaghal recorded more material for split releases and signed a deal with already familiar Aftermath Music for the release of a MCD and a new full-length record. The result was the limited-edition Kyy MCD and their most raw recording to date, Perkeleen Luoma. These two releases were also released as a double LP by Finnish label Hammer of Hate. In the absence of a drummer, these releases were recorded with a drum machine (known as "Unhuman Warmachine") to give the recordings a colder and more non-human atmosphere. After nearly ten years as a band with a negative attitude towards gigs, they finally decided to start playing live in 2004, so TM Blastbeast (aka Teemu Mutka, ex-Deep Red, Nerlich) was brought in as a drummer. Their first live appearance was at the Under The Black Sun Festival in Germany in Summer 2004. They have played gigs sporadically since then. Later in 2004 the band signed with their current label Avantgarde Music, and recorded the album Codex Antitheus. In support of this they played a few more gigs in 2005 in Switzerland and Italy. In 2006, Azaghal recorded a second album for Avantgarde Music, Luciferin Valo. This album saw a more back-to-basics approach, both in simplified song writing and rawer production. After the recordings, they replaced drummer TM Blastbeast with Chernobog (also a member of Kingdom of Agony). Two years later Varjoherra left the band due to a lack of time available to dedicate, so he was replaced by Niflungr, with whom he also has started another project called Black Blessing. From that point Niflungr took over lead vocals, but the arrangement does not preclude Vorjaherra returning to the band on occasion.

In 2008, Omega was released via Moribund Records in Europe and Paranoid Records in Brazil. One year later Azaghal recorded another album, called Teraphim, featuring a new version of the track "Kyy".

== Line-up ==
=== Current line-up ===
- Narqath - Guitar, bass, vocals, keyboard (ex-Calm (Fin), ex-Decay's Delight, Finnugor, ex-Hellkult, ex-Hin Onde, ex-Necromortum, ex-Oath of Cirion, ex-Svartalfheim (Fin), Svartkraft, ex-Thoronath, ex-Valar, Vultyr, Weltraum, With Hate I Burn, Wyrd)
- Niflungr - Vocals, bass (Kingdom Of Agony, Teurastus, Black Blessing)
- Lima - Drums (Amberian Dawn, Dotma, Epicrenel, Hautakammio, Sawhill Sacrifice, Thaurorod, Lathspell)

=== Former members ===
- Varjoherra - Vocals, drums (ex-Vultyr, Bapthomet, Black Blessing)
- JL Nokturnal - Guitar, synthesizers, bass, drums (ex-Hin Onde, Medieval Art, Nocturnal Winds, Wyrd, Yearning, Svartkraft)

=== Drummers ===
- T.M. Blastbeast(Acabó el Silencio, Cadaveric Incubator, ex-Carcase Inc., ex-Deep Red (Fin), Jumalation, Nerlich)
- Chernobog (Kingdom of Agony)
- Kalma aka v-KhaoZ aka VRTX (Ville Pallonen) (ex-Druadan Forest, ex-Hellkult, ex-Hin Onde, ex-Noitavalkea, ex-Oath of Cirion, ex-Svartalfheim (Fin), Calm (Fin))

== Discography ==
=== Studio albums ===
- 1999 Mustamaa
- 1999 Helvetin Yhdeksän Piiriä
- 2002 Of Beasts And Vultures
- 2004 Perkeleen Luoma
- 2005 Codex Antitheus
- 2006 Luciferin Valo
- 2008 Omega
- 2009 Teraphim
- 2012 Nemesis
- 2015 Madon Sanat
- 2018 Valo pohjoisesta
- 2023 Alttarimme on luista tehty

=== EPs and splits ===
- 1999 Harmagedon (EP)
- 2000 Uusi Suomalainen Black Metal Tulokas (Split)
- 2001 Suicide Anthems / Dark Blasphemous Moon (Split)
- 2002 Helwettiläinen (EP)
- 2002 Black Metal War (Split)
- 2003 Omenne (Split)
- 2003 Unholy Terror Union (Split)
- 2003 Kyy (EP)
- 2004 Krieg / Azaghal (Split)
- 2004 None Shall Escape... (Split)
- 2004 Neljä Vihan Vasaraa / Four Hammers of Hate (Split)
- 2006 Azaghal Terror Cult / Wrath (Split)

=== Demos ===
- 1998 Demo I
- 1998 Noituuden Torni
- 1998 Kristinusko Liekeissä
- 2001 Black Terror Metal

=== Compilations ===
- 2000 DeathKult MMDCLXVI
- 2001 Ihmisviha
