= Esoteric (band) =

British doom metal band

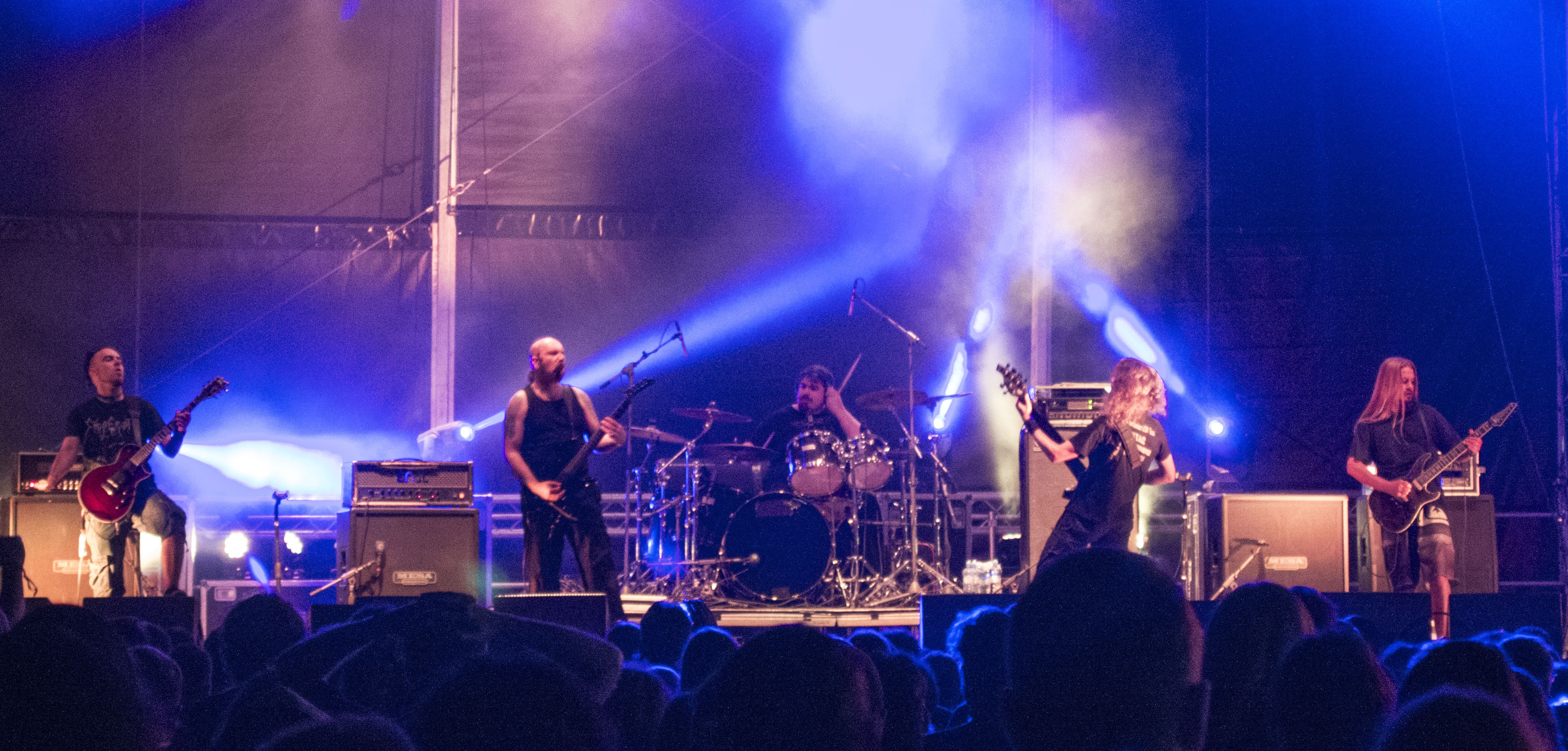
- Esoteric at Brutal Assault 2015

Background information
- Origin: Birmingham, England
- Genres: Funeral doom
- Years active: 1992–present
- Labels: Season of Mist; Eibon; Aesthetic Death
- Members: Greg Chandler; Mark Bodossian; Joe Fletcher; Kris Clayton; Simon Walcroft
- Website: esotericuk.net

Esoteric is an English funeral doom metal band from Birmingham, founded in 1992. Releasing seven studio albums, and a demo, the band is widely regarded as among the first groups to develop the funeral doom style. The band has named a variety of groups as influences, such as metal bands Morbid Angel and My Dying Bride, more "trippy" artists such as Pink Floyd, Spacemen 3, and King Crimson, and the industrial and dark ambient genres.

== History ==
Esoteric was formed in 1992, and in 1993, released Esoteric Emotions – The Death of Ignorance – a demo tape containing 82 minutes of material with a total of eight tracks. Shortly thereafter they received an offer from Aesthetic Death to record a full-length CD of new material.

In June 1994, Esoteric entered Rich Bitch studios in Birmingham to record six tracks to be released as a double CD, titled Epistemological Despondency. Soon after the recording of this album, Stuart Blenkinsop (guitar) and Darren (drums) left the band, leaving Greg Chandler (vocals), Bryan Beck (bass), Simon Phillips and Gordon Bicknell (guitars). In September of that year, Steve Peters joined Esoteric to complete the guitar section. However, a suitable drummer was yet to be found.

Having only played a handful of gigs in the UK, Esoteric travelled to Germany to play a series of shows. Halfway through the tour, they were forced to turn back after an injury to Steve's leg made it impossible to continue. In June 1995, the band was back on the road with a small tour of the UK. This tour was also cut short after only two shows when their equipment was destroyed by fire. Once the equipment was replaced, Esoteric began to prepare for the recording of their second release on Aesthetic Death Records.

In 1996, Esoteric entered the studio once more to record The Pernicious Enigma – their second double-CD, consisting of 9 tracks. Towards the end of 1997, one day before they were due to depart for a short tour of Germany, Simon (guitar) left the band without warning. Greg (vocals) was able to fill in at short notice. This has since become a permanent arrangement.

Progress was becoming slow without a full line-up and with increasing work commitments, and the three tracks that were in development over a period of two years were recorded in order to make way for new material; without a permanent drummer, Esoteric was forced to use session drum-work, provided courtesy of Keith York. Eibon Records (Italy) offered to release these tracks which were recorded, engineered and produced without the aid of professional mixing and/or mastering technicians, and in 1999, Metamorphogenesis, was released.

In May 2002, just one week before Esoteric were due to start recording their fourth album, Bryan (bass) left the band leaving the three remaining members to record the album. This was done in intervals over a period of time spanning across the rest of the year and into 2003, using session work (as with their previous album) involving Keith York on drums and Trevor Lines on bass. After negotiation with various labels, Esoteric signed with the French label Season of Mist. The album titled Subconscious Dissolution into the Continuum was released on 28 June 2004.

Esoteric completed their line-up in mid-2003, including Andy Semmens (drums) and Mark Bodossian (bass). In addition, Olivier Goyet joined the band to perform on the keyboards which allowed them to better orchestrate their material in a live environment, where the use of an extra instrument has become necessary to emulate the complexity of the studio recordings. Following this was a number of shows and tours throughout Europe in 2004 and 2005.

In 2005, Semmens left the band, Steve Peters left in 2007, and Olivier Goyet in mid-2009. Kris Clayton (founder of Camel of Doom) joined as session live guitarist in 2007. This arrangement remained in place until 2009 when Ilia Rodriguez took over live duties. Jim Nolan, a permanent third guitarist was found at the end of 2009. Joe Fletcher joined on drums at the beginning of 2007. The 5th album titled The Maniacal Vale and recorded at Priory Recording Studios was released to critical acclaim in June 2008. Since then Esoteric have performed live throughout Europe. Founding member and guitarist Gordon Bicknell briefly left in early 2011 for unknown reasons, contributing guitars and keyboards to only one track ("Non-Being") on the band's sixth studio album Paragon of Dissonance which was released on 11 November 2011 in Europe and 15 November 2011 for the rest of the world. He has since rejoined.

== Discography ==
Demos

- Esoteric Emotions – The Death of Ignorance (self-released, 1993)

Studio albums

- Epistemological Despondency (Aesthetic Death, 1994)
- The Pernicious Enigma (Aesthetic Death, 1997)
- Metamorphogenesis (Eibon Records, 1999)
- Subconscious Dissolution into the Continuum (Season of Mist, 2004)
- The Maniacal Vale (Season of Mist, 2008)
- Paragon of Dissonance (Season of Mist, 2011)
- A Pyrrhic Existence (Season of Mist, 2019)

== Members ==
=== Current members ===
- Greg Chandler – vocals (1992–present), guitar (1999–present)
- Mark Bodossian – bass (2003–present)
- Joe Fletcher – drums (2007–present)
- Mathew Barnes – guitar (2022–present)

=== Former members ===
- Darren Earl – drums (1992–1994)
- Stuart Blenkinsop – guitar (1992–1994)
- Simon Phillips – guitar (1992–1997)
- Bryan Beck – bass (1992–2002)
- Gordon Bicknell – guitars (1992–2019), keyboards (1992–1996)
- Andy Semmens – drums (2003–2005)
- Steve Peters – guitar (1994–2007)
- Olivier Goyet – keyboards (2003–2009)
- Kris Clayton - Guitar (2007-2009, 2019-2022)
- Jim Nolan – guitar (2009–2019)
- Jan Krause – keyboards (2012–2014)
- Simon Walcroft - Guitar (2020-2025)

=== Session ===
- Anthony – drums (recording)
- Keith York – drums (recording)
- Trevor Lines – bass (recording)
- Ilia Rodriguez – guitar (live)

=== Guest ===
- Tom Kvålsvoll (Paradigma/Dødheimsgard) – vocals (Metamorphogenesis)
