= Funeral doom =

Extreme genre of music

- Stylistic origins: Death-doom; dirge music
- Cultural origins: Mid-1990s, Finland
- Typical instruments: Electric guitar; bass guitar; Electronic keyboard; drums; vocals

Regional scenes
- Finland; Russia

Other topics
- Death metal; Doom metal

Funeral doom is a subgenre of death-doom with heavy influence from funeral dirge music. Low-tuned guitars, death growls, instruments that emulate pipe organ sounds and ponderous pace are typical traits of this style.

== History ==
An offshoot of death-doom, the genre was mostly inspired by the work of Autopsy, Winter, Cathedral and early Paradise Lost. Funeral doom truly came into being in the mid-1990s. The genre was birthed out of Finland; Thergothon and Skepticism are commonly cited as the earliest two bands in the style, as well as Unholy. Outside Scandinavia, the lines between death-doom and funeral doom pioneers were less clear cut. diSEMBOWELMENT, from Australia, Birmingham-based Esoteric, and American act Evoken are examples.

With the turn of the millennium came releases of newer bands, such as Shape of Despair, Mournful Congregation, the "Nautik Doom" group Ahab and one-man-projects Nortt and Doom:VS. Funeral doom scenes cropped up over the world, such as the one in Russia. The Solitude Productions label, for example, became a major force in shaping its future. Like no metal subgenre before it, the internet boom greatly helped funeral doom reach new fans. By the 2010s, funeral doom reached into metal's mainstream.

Another sign of funeral doom's increasing status was Peaceville's move to buy the rights of Avantgarde Music's back catalogue. Responsible for launching the careers of Autopsy, Paradise Lost, My Dying Bride and Anathema, Peaceville was the major player in shaping what became known as death-doom.

Although it has a substantial following, funeral doom has also its share of criticism. Chronicles of Chaos co-editor Pedro Azevedo argued that, to the average listener, funeral doom might sound "boring and repetitive". Ciarán Tracey, in an article for Terrorizer, acknowledged that the increasing popularity of funeral doom also meant that it now had its "share of hangers-on and can act as a repository for pseudo-literary teen poetry and artless abstraction, so a certain critical scrutiny has become necessary."

== Characteristics ==
=== Instrumentation and vocals ===
Coc's Azevedo described funeral doom's core sound as a mix of "downtuned guitars, ponderous drumming, church organs and cavernous death vox" done at an "extremely slow" pace. Though it kept death metal's low-tuning and death growls, funeral doom eschewed most of its complex song structures and rapid tempo changes in a favor of a minimalist approach and slower tempos. Depending on the band, it keeps some genre-specific characteristics of death-doom, such as violins and female vocals. Some background elements - church bells, keyboards or synthesizers - are many a time part of funeral doom's overall sound, adding a "dreamlike" quality to what is often described as a heavy and burdensome atmosphere. Skepticism keyboardist Eero Pöyry said that "I position myself as a church organ player in a metal band". Furthermore, Pöyry explained that, at the time,

Many bands were either using [keyboards] as background, almost like an effect, and others were using it like a second solo guitar, using keyboard solos and all that. Neither of those felt like ours. I kind of thought what a keyboard player in a metal band like this should be like. It should be like the organist in a church. In that lineup, the organ became much like what the second guitar would have been. The way to position it in the sound was church organ-like. Thinking through all the things you should do and not do… I started taking it in the organist direction instead of soloist direction [...]. It's pretty much a church organ setup in a metal band as well.

=== Lyrics ===
Thematically, funeral doom avoided the "Peaceville Three"'s gothic sensibilities in favor of a more nihilistic world view, evoking a sense of emptiness and despair. Thanatology topics such as grief, loss and suicide are central to the style. Apart from that, thematic content varies widely. Thergothon's lyrics were inspired by H. P. Lovecraft's Cthulhu Mythos. Ahab notoriously wrote whole concept albums based on Herman Melville's classic Moby Dick. In turn, Esoteric experimented with a variety of psychotropic substances - LSD, magic mushrooms and cannabis - to explore the obscure recesses of the unconscious mind. Their dark take on psychedelia inspires music and words that resemble a soundtrack to a "bad trip".

== Etymology ==
Funeral doom's name has two distinct genealogies. One source claimed it was a namesake of Norway's death-doom outfit Funeral. It might have come, too, from Skepticism's pipe organ-like keyboard timbre, which reminded listeners of funeral music.

== Bibliography ==
- Ebner, Arne (25 July 2010). Ästhetik des Doom (PDF) (Bachelor) (in German). Macromedia University of Applied Sciences for Media and Communication – Cologne. Archived from the original (PDF) on 4 March 2016.
- 'Harry' Hinchliffe, James (2006). "Funeral Doom/Drone Doom: Hearse Play". Terrorizer. 143. London: 44–45.
- 'Harry' Hinchliffe, James (2006). "Thergothon - 'Stream from the Heavens' (1993)". Terrorizer. 144. London: 54.
- Minton, James; Kelly, Kim; Selby, Jenn (2009). "Filth Parade". Terrorizer. 188. London: 56.
- Tracey, Ciarán (2006). "Doom/Death: United In Grief". Terrorizer. 142. London: 54–55.
