= Under a Godless Veil =

Studio album by Draconian
- Released: 30 October 2020
- Recorded: 2018–2019
- Genres: Gothic metal, death-doom
- Length: 62:10
- Label: Napalm
- Producer: Johan Ericson

Draconian chronology
Sovran (2015)	Under a Godless Veil (2020)	In Somnolent Ruin (2026)

Singles from Under a Godless Veil
- 1. "Lustrous Heart" Released: 5 May 2020; 2. "Sorrow of Sophia" Released: 16 July 2020

Professional ratings
Review scores
Source	Rating
Blabbermouth.net	8.5/10
Distorted Sound	8/10
Metal Hammer	3.5/5 stars
Metal Hammer Germany	5/7 stars
Plattentests.de	7/10
Sonic Perspectives	8.8/10

Under a Godless Veil is the seventh studio album by Swedish gothic metal band Draconian, released on 30 October 2020 through Napalm Records. It is their first album since Arcane Rain Fell (2005) without longtime bassist Fredrik Johansson, who left the band in April 2016. Daniel Änghede performed bass for this album. It is also their last album with Heike Langhans, who left the band in 2022.

A lyric video for "Lustrous Heart" was released on 5 May 2020, followed by "Sorrow of Sophia" on 16 July 2020.

== Track listing ==
All lyrics are written by Anders Jacobsson except where noted; all music is composed by Johan Ericson.

No.	Title	Length
1.	"Sorrow of Sophia"	7:28
2.	"The Sacrificial Flame"	7:30
3.	"Lustrous Heart"	4:47
4.	"Sleepwalkers" (Heike Langhans, Anders Jacobsson)	6:45
5.	"Moon Over Sabaoth"	5:50
6.	"Burial Fields"	4:35
7.	"The Sethian"	6:51
8.	"Claw Marks on the Throne"	5:42
9.	"Night Visitor"	3:48
10.	"Ascend Into Darkness"	8:54
Total length:		62:10

== Personnel ==
- Heike Langhans – clean vocals
- Anders Jacobsson – unclean vocals
- Johan Ericson – lead guitar, backing vocals
- Daniel Arvidsson – rhythm guitar, vocals on "The Sethian"
- Daniel Änghede – bass
- Jerry Torstensson – drums, percussion
- Daniel Neagoe – narration on "Burial Fields"

=== Production ===
- Arranged and produced by Johan Ericson, additional string arrangement on "Sorrow of Sophia" by Erik Arvinder.
