= Broken Anatomy =

American funeral doom metal band

- Origin: New Jersey, United States
- Genres: Funeral doom metal, Death-doom
- Years active: 2011–2015
- Label: Exalted Woe Records
- Members: Samantha Michelle Smith, Stuart Prickett

Broken Anatomy was an American funeral doom metal band, originating in Clifton, New Jersey, that is influenced by the bands Evoken, Disembowelment, Dark Castle (band), and Cianide. Broken Anatomy is one of the first doom metal bands to be fronted by an openly LGBT woman. The band has released two studio albums, one demo, and two EPs, and their album The Lazarus Regret features Paul Kuhr of Novembers Doom on guest vocals.

== Members ==
Current

- Samantha Michelle Smith – Guitars, Vocals, Bass, Drums, Keyboards (2011–present)
- Stuart Prickett – Guitars (2013–present)

Guest

- Paul Kuhr - Guest Vocals on The Lazarus Regret

== Discography ==
=== Studio albums ===
- The Obsession (2012)
- The Lazarus Regret (2014)

=== Demos ===
- A Shadow Deemed Worthy (2012)

=== EPs ===
- Freedom Within (2012)
- Nightmares From an Unremembered Age (2013)
