= Of Sculptured Ivy and Stone Flowers =

Studio album by Novembers Doom
- Released: May 25, 1999
- Genre: Death-doom, gothic metal
- Length: 49:53
- Label: Martyr Music
- Producer: Brian Griffin

Novembers Doom chronology
Amid Its Hallowed Mirth (1995)	Of Sculptured Ivy and Stone Flowers (1999)	The Knowing (2000)

Reissue cover

Professional ratings
Review scores
Source	Rating
AllMusic	3.5/5 stars
Chronicles of Chaos	8/10

Of Sculptured Ivy and Stone Flowers is the second studio album by the American death-doom band Novembers Doom, The album was released in 1999. This album features an entirely different lineup from its predecessor, save for vocalists Paul Kuhr and Cathy Jo Hejna.

== Track listing ==
No.	Title	Length
1.	"With Rue and Fire"	5:41
2.	"The Jealous Sun"	6:09
3.	"Suffer the Red Dream"	7:58
4.	"All the Beauty Twice Again"	4:17
5.	"Reaping Forest Calm"	5:30
6.	"Before the Wind"	3:10
7.	"For Every Leaf That Falls"	4:35
8.	"Serenity Forgotten"	2:10
9.	"Forever with Unopened Eye"	4:17
10.	"Dawn Breaks"	6:06
Total length:		49:53

2008 remastered version
No.	Title	Length
1.	"With Rue and Fire"	5:41
2.	"The Jealous Sun"	6:09
3.	"Suffer the Red Dream"	7:58
4.	"All the Beauty Twice Again"	4:17
5.	"Reaping Forest Calm"	5:30
6.	"For Every Leaf That Falls"	4:35
7.	"Serenity Forgotten"	2:10
8.	"Forever with Unopened Eye"	4:17
9.	"Dawn Breaks"	6:06
10.	"Serenity Remembered" (bonus track)	2:10
11.	"For Every Leaf That Falls" (Soft Version, bonus track)	5:15
12.	"Forever with Unopened Eye" (Soft Version, bonus track)	3:35
Total length:		57:43

== Personnel ==
- Paul Kuhr - vocals
- Sasha Horn - drums
- Cathy Jo Hejna - vocals
- Mary Bielich - bass
- Eric Burnley - guitars

=== Additional personnel and staff ===
- Erik Kikke - guitars on "Forever with Unopened Eye"
- Mark Piotrowski - keyboards on "Before the Wind"
- Brian Griffin - producer, recording, engineering
