= Aphotic (album) =

Studio album by Novembers Doom
- Released: May 10, 2011
- Genre: Death-doom, progressive death metal, gothic metal
- Length: 50:51
- Label: The End
- Producer: Novembers Doom, Chris Wisco

Novembers Doom chronology
Into Night's Requiem Infernal (2009)	Aphotic (2011)	Bled White (2014)

Professional ratings
Review scores
Source	Rating
About.com	4.5/5 stars
AllMusic	3.5/5 stars
Blabbermouth.net	9/10
Chronicles of Chaos	8/10
Metal Review	(8.6/10)
My Metal Bin	10/10 stars
Ultimate Guitar	7/10

Aphotic is the eighth studio album by the American death-doom band Novembers Doom. It was released in May 10, 2011 on The End Records. The album has a more progressive death metal feel to it than the band's standard death-doom sound.

== Track listing ==
No.	Title	Length
1.	"The Dark Host"	8:08
2.	"Harvest Scythe"	5:42
3.	"Buried"	6:32
4.	"What Could Have Been"	6:33
5.	"Of Age and Origin - Part 1: A Violent Day"	5:04
6.	"Of Age and Origin - Part 2: A Day of Joy"	3:19
7.	"Six Sides"	7:47
8.	"Shadow Play"	7:46
Total length:		50:51

== Personnel ==
- Paul Kuhr - vocals, photography
- Mike Feldman - bass
- Vito Marchese - guitars
- Larry Roberts - guitars, vocals
- Sasha Horn - drums

=== Additional personnel and staff ===
- Ben Johnson - keyboards
- Rachel Barton Pine - violin on "What Could Have Been" and "The Dark Host"
- Dan Swanö - vocals on "Of Age and Origin", mastering, mixing
- Anneke van Giersbergen - vocals on "What Could Have Been"
- Raymond Boykin - photography
- Jason Hicks - artwork (interior)
- Tommy Genest - artwork (cover)
- Chris Wisco - engineering, editing
