= Amid Its Hallowed Mirth =

Studio album by Novembers Doom
- Released: February 10, 1995
- Recorded: 1993–1994
- Genre: Death-doom
- Length: 47:33
- Label: Avantgarde Music
- Producer: Novembers Doom

Novembers Doom chronology
Amid Its Hallowed Mirth (1995)	Of Sculptured Ivy and Stone Flowers (1999)

2008 reissue cover

Professional ratings
Review scores
Source	Rating
AllMusic	3/5 stars

Amid Its Hallowed Mirth is the debut studio album by the American death-doom band Novembers Doom. It was originally released in 1995 on Avantgarde Music, and later re-released in 2001 with a different cover and different track listing on Dark Symphonies and in 2008, it remastered format with different artwork and bonus tracks on The End Records.

== Track listing ==
No.	Title	Length
1.	"Aurora's Garden"	7:27
2.	"Amour of the Harp"	7:20
3.	"Tears of the Beautiful"	4:45
4.	"My Agony, My Ecstasy"	5:04
5.	"Bestow My Desire"	3:09
6.	"Chorus of Jasmine"	7:12
7.	"Dance of the Leaves" (instrumental)	2:49
8.	"Sadness Rains"	4:45
9.	"A Dirge of Sorrow"	5:02
Total length:		47:33

2008 re-release bonus tracks
No.	Title	Length
10.	"Nothing Earthly Save the Thrill"	5:52
11.	"Seasons of Frost"	7:24
12.	"Scarification"	4:36
13.	"Winter Solstice"	4:34
14.	"Mammaliferous Earth"	3:35
15.	"Crown of Thorns"	5:46
Total length:		79:20

- The bonus tracks 10–11 are taken from the 1995 Her Tears Drop demo.
- The bonus tracks 12–15 are taken from the 1992 Scabs demo by the pre-Novembers Doom band called Laceration.

== Personnel ==
- Paul Kuhr – vocals
- Steve Nicholson – guitars, bass
- Joe Hernandez – drums
- Cathy Jo Hejna – vocals

=== Additional personnel and staff ===
- Emmett Hall - drums on "Nothing Earthly Save the Thrill" and "Seasons of Frost"
- Jim Bresnhan - guitars on "Nothing Earthly Save the Thrill" and "Seasons of Frost"
- Jim Harvey - producer, engineering
- Ron Reid - producer, engineering
- Chris Wisco - mastering
- Mike Lager- Electric and Double Bass on "Sadness Reigns" and "A Dirge of Sorrow." Lager also played bass on tracks

"Scarification," "Winter Solstice," "Mammaliferous Earth," and "Crown of Thorns" Unofficially we believe this to be the first bowed double bass in all of metal. It was revolutionary at the time in 1992-1995.
