= Bled White (album) =

Studio album by Novembers Doom
- Released: July 15, 2014
- Studio: Belle City Sound, Racine Wisconsin; Unisound, Orebro, Sweden
- Genre: Death-doom, progressive death metal, gothic metal
- Length: 1:08:21
- Label: The End
- Producer: Novembers Doom

Novembers Doom chronology
Aphotic (2011)	Bled White (2014)	Hamartia (2017)

Professional ratings
Review scores
Source	Rating
AllMusic	4/5 stars
Angrymetalguy	3.5/5 stars
Blabbermouth.net	8.5/10
Metal Injection	7.5/10
MetalReview	95/100
Metal Storm	8.1/10
No Clean Singing	favorable
Pitchfork	6.8/10

Bled White is the ninth studio album by the American death-doom band Novembers Doom. It was released in 2014 on The End Records.

== Track listing ==
No.	Title	Length
1.	"Bled White"	6:49
2.	"Heartfelt"	7:09
3.	"Just Breathe"	7:50
4.	"Scorpius"	1:15
5.	"Unrest"	5:25
6.	"The Memory Room"	6:53
7.	"The Brave Pawn"	3:58
8.	"Clear"	6:06
9.	"The Grand Circle"	6:48
10.	"Animus"	6:39
11.	"The Silent Dark"	9:29
Total length:		68:21

== Personnel ==
Novembers Doom

- Paul Kuhr – vocals, photography
- Mike Feldman – bass
- Vito Marchese – guitars
- Larry Roberts – guitars, vocals
- Garry Naples – drums

Additional personnel and staff

- Dan Swanö – backing vocals (track 5)
- Ben Johnson – keyboards
