= Turning Season Within =

Studio album by Draconian
- Released: 29 February 2008
- Recorded: September 2007 at Fascination Street Studio
- Genre: Gothic metal, death-doom
- Length: 52:35
- Label: Napalm
- Producer: Draconian

Draconian chronology
The Burning Halo (2006)	Turning Season Within (2008)	A Rose for the Apocalypse (2011)

Professional ratings
Review scores
Source	Rating
Allmusic	4/5 stars
Sea of Tranquility	4/5 stars
Sputnik	4/5 stars

Turning Season Within is the fourth studio album by Swedish gothic metal band Draconian. It was released on 29 February 2008 (4 March in the US), through Napalm Records. This album also features Paul Kuhr from Novembers Doom on the track September Ashes.

The album's main theme is a failed relationship between two lovers.

== Track listing ==
All lyrics are written by Anders Jacobsson; all music is composed by Johan Ericson except where noted.

No.	Title	Length
1.	"Seasons Apart"	6:32
2.	"When I Wake"	5:50
3.	"Earthbound"	8:11
4.	"Not Breathing"	5:39
5.	"The Failure Epiphany"	6:21
6.	"Morphine Cloud"	7:33
7.	"Bloodflower"	5:32
8.	"The Empty Stare"	5:47
9.	"September Ashes" (Andreas Karlsson)	1:10
Total length:		52:35

== Personnel ==
- Lisa Johansson: clean vocals
- Anders Jacobsson: unclean vocals
- Johan Ericson: Lead guitar, Backing vocals
- Daniel Arvidsson: Rhythm guitar
- Fredrik Johansson: Bass
- Jerry Torstensson: Drums, Percussion
- Andreas Karlsson (no longer an official member): Additional keyboards, composer of "September Ashes"
- Paul Kuhr (of Novembers Doom): Guest vocals & narration on "September Ashes"

== Production ==
- Arranged and produced by Draconian
- Recorded and engineered by David Castillo and Johan Ornborg
- Mixed and mastered by Jens Bogren
