= The Knowing =

Studio album by Novembers Doom
- Released: November 1, 2000
- Genre: Death-doom, gothic metal
- Length: 58:28
- Label: Dark Symphonies
- Producer: Novembers Doom

Novembers Doom chronology
Of Sculptured Ivy and Stone Flowers (1999)	The Knowing (2000)	To Welcome the Fade (2002)

Reissue cover

Professional ratings
Review scores
Source	Rating
AllMusic	4/5 stars
Bravewords	8/10
Chronicles of Chaos	9/10

The Knowing is the third studio album by the American death-doom band Novembers Doom, released in 2000.

== Track listing ==
No.	Title	Length
1.	"Awaken"	3:33
2.	"Harmony Divine"	5:17
3.	"Shadows of Light"	4:38
4.	"Intervene" (instrumental)	1:52
5.	"Silent Tomorrow"	5:13
6.	"In Faith"	5:18
7.	"Searching the Betrayal"	4:40
8.	"Last God"	9:43
9.	"In Memories Past"	5:02
10.	"The Day I Return"	5:14
11.	"Aura Blue"	7:58
Total length:		58:28

Bonus track
No.	Title	Length
12.	"Silent Tomorrow (Dark Edit)"	5:11
Total length:		63:39

== Personnel ==
- Paul Kuhr - vocals, design, layout
- Joe Nunez - drums
- Eric Burnley - guitars, keyboards (vocals track 10)
- Mary Bielich - bass
- Larry Roberts - guitars

=== Additional personnel and staff ===
- Sophie Kopecky - vocals (track 8)
- Sarah Wilson - vocals (tracks 7 & 8)
- Travis Smith - cover art
- Chris Wisco - recording, mixing
- Tom Weis - photography
