= Nephilim Grove =

Studio album by Novembers Doom
- Released: November 1, 2019
- Recorded: 2019
- Studio: Unisound
- Genre: Death-doom, progressive death metal, gothic metal
- Length: 53:04
- Label: Prophecy

Novembers Doom chronology
| Hamartia (2017) | Nephilim Grove (2019) | Major Arcana (2025) |

Professional ratings
Review scores
| Source | Rating |
|---|---|
| AngryMetalGuy | 3/5 stars |
| Bravewords | 8.5/10 |
| Metal Storm | 7.3/10 |
| Sonic Perspectives | 8.8/10 |

Nephilim Grove is the eleventh studio album by the American death-doom band Novembers Doom. The album was released on November 1, 2019 via Prophecy Productions.

== Track listing ==
| No. | Title | Length |
|---|---|---|
| 1. | "Petrichor" | 6:12 |
| 2. | "The Witness Marks" | 4:45 |
| 3. | "Nephilim Grove" | 6:49 |
| 4. | "What We Become" | 6:31 |
| 5. | "Adagio" | 5:35 |
| 6. | "Black Light" | 6:10 |
| 7. | "The Clearing Blind" | 5:40 |
| 8. | "Still Warmth" | 5:36 |
| 9. | "The Obelus" | 5:46 |
| Total length: | | 53:04 |

== Personnel ==
Novembers Doom

- Paul Kuhr – vocals
- Lawrence Roberts – guitars
- Vito Marchese – guitars
- Mike Feldman – bass guitar
- Garry Naples – drums

Additional personnel

- Dan Swanö – mastering, mixing
- Pig Hands – cover art
