= Into Night's Requiem Infernal =

Studio album by Novembers Doom
- Released: July 7, 2009
- Recorded: Belle City Sound studio in Racine, Wisconsin
- Genre: Death-doom, progressive death metal, gothic metal
- Length: 44:58
- Label: The End
- Producer: Chris Wisco, Novembers Doom

Novembers Doom chronology
The Novella Reservoir (2007)	Into Night's Requiem Infernal (2009)	Aphotic (2011)

Professional ratings
Review scores
Source	Rating
AllMusic	3.5/5 stars
Blabbermouth.net	8/10
Chronicles of Chaos	8.5/10
Exclaim!	favorable

Into Night's Requiem Infernal is the seventh studio album by the American death-doom band Novembers Doom. It was released on July 7, 2009 through The End Records. The album was recorded at Belle City Sound studio in Racine, Wisconsin with bassist Chris Djuricic producing and Dan Swanö mixing at Unisound in Örebro, Sweden.

== Track listing ==
No.	Title	Length
1.	"Into Night's Requiem Infernal"	5:46
2.	"A Eulogy for the Living Lost"	6:30
3.	"Empathy's Greed"	6:17
4.	"The Fifth Day of March"	5:16
5.	"Lazarus Regret"	3:06
6.	"I Hurt Those I Adore"	5:47
7.	"The Harlot's Lie"	5:32
8.	"When Desperation Fills the Void"	6:44
Total length:		44:58

== Personnel ==
- Paul Kuhr - vocals
- Chris Wisco - bass, producer, engineering, editing
- Sasha Horn - drums
- Larry Roberts - guitars
- Vito Marchese - guitars

=== Additional personnel and staff ===
- Thomas A.G. Jensen - vocals on "When Desperation Fills the Void"
- Wiley Wells - keyboards
- Tommy Guest - design, illustration
- Dan Swanö - mixing, mastering
- Raymond Bovkin - band photography
