= To Welcome the Fade =

Studio album by Novembers Doom
- Released: September 10, 2002
- Genre: Death-doom, gothic metal
- Length: 54:51
- Label: Dark Symphonies
- Producer: Neil Kernon

Novembers Doom chronology
The Knowing (2000)	To Welcome the Fade (2002)	The Pale Haunt Departure (2005)

Professional ratings
Review scores
Source	Rating
AllMusic	4.5/5 stars
Chronicles of Chaos	9/10
Exclaim!	favorable
Metal Storm	8.7/10

To Welcome the Fade is the fourth studio album by the American death-doom band Novembers Doom, released in 2002. It was re-issued in 2004 by The End Records with a second CD containing the EP For Every Leaf that Falls as well as live versions of "Lost in a Day" and "Not the Strong" and a live bootleg video for "Within My Flesh".

== Track listing ==
No.	Title	Length
1.	"Not the Strong"	5:00
2.	"Broken"	7:36
3.	"Lost in a Day"	5:30
4.	"Within My Flesh"	4:51
5.	"If Forever"	3:47
6.	"The Spirit Seed"	7:13
7.	"Torn"	5:46
8.	"The Lifeless Silhouette"	5:55
9.	"Dreams to Follow" (instrumental)	1:37
10.	"Dark Fields for Brilliance"	7:36
Total length:		54:51

Reissue bonus CD
No.	Title	Length
1.	"For Every Leaf That Falls"	4:53
2.	"The Jealous Sun"	6:54
3.	"Dawn Breaks"	6:50
4.	"Lost in a Day" (live)	5:13
5.	"Not the Strong" (live)	5:18
Total length:		29:08

== Personnel ==
- Paul Kuhr - vocals, artwork, layout
- Joe Nunez - drums
- Larry Roberts - guitars
- Eric Wayne Burnley - guitars, keyboards

=== Additional personnel and staff ===
- Neil Kernon - additional solo guitar on "Dark Fields for Brilliance", keyboards on "If Forever", producer, recording, mixing
- Nora O'Conner - female vocals
- Brian Gordon - bass
- Ramón Bretón - mastering
- Justin Leeah - engineering
- Travis Smith - artwork
