= The Novella Reservoir =

Studio album by Novembers Doom
- Released: February 20, 2007
- Genre: Death-doom, gothic metal
- Length: 45:54
- Label: The End
- Producer: Chris Wisco, Novembers Doom

Novembers Doom chronology
The Pale Haunt Departure (2005)	The Novella Reservoir (2007)	Into Night's Requiem Infernal (2009)

Professional ratings
Review scores
Source	Rating
AllMusic	4/5 stars
Blabbermouth.net	9/10
Bravewords	8.5/10
Chronicles of Chaos	9.5/10
Exclaim!	favorable
Metal Storm	7.4/10
Revolver	2.5/5 stars

The Novella Reservoir is the sixth studio album by the American death-doom band Novembers Doom, released in 2007. The overall sound of the album carries on from the musical direction of the previous release The Pale Haunt Departure, while incorporating some heavier and faster death metal elements than before. A special edition of this album contained an 84-page, full-color book entitled "The Wayfaring Chronicles" that features lyrics and history/explanations of the songs and albums, a sticker, a band photo that is autographed and a bag for it all to fit in.

== Track listing ==
No.	Title	Length
1.	"Rain"	4:16
2.	"The Novella Reservoir"	5:22
3.	"Drown the Inland Mere"	6:00
4.	"Twilight Innocence"	5:58
5.	"The Voice of Failure"	5:51
6.	"They Were Left to Die"	5:30
7.	"Dominate the Human Strain"	5:30
8.	"Leaving This"	7:27
Total length:		45:54

== Personnel ==
- Paul Kuhr - vocals
- Chris Wisco - bass, producer, engineering, editing
- Joe Nunez - drums
- Vito Marchese - guitars
- Larry Roberts - guitars

=== Additional personnel and staff ===
- Ed "Shreddy" Bethishou - keyboards
- Dan Swanö - mixing
- James Murphy - mastering
- Travis Smith - artwork
- Mark Coatsworth - photography
