= Where Lovers Mourn =

Studio album by Draconian
- Released: 20 October 2003
- Recorded: June 2003 at Studio Mega
- Genres: Gothic metal, death-doom
- Length: 52:49
- Label: Napalm

Draconian chronology
Where Lovers Mourn (2003)	Arcane Rain Fell (2005)

Professional ratings
Review scores
Source	Rating
Allmusic	3.5/5 stars
Scream Magazine	5/6 stars

Where Lovers Mourn is the debut studio album by Swedish gothic metal band Draconian. The album was released through Napalm Records on 20 October 2003. It was recorded and produced at Studio Mega by Chris Silver and Draconian in June 2003.

Most of the songs in this album are new and enhanced versions for songs Draconian had previously written for its demos and EPs, mainly for "Dark Oceans We Cry" and "Frozen Features".

The first song, "The Cry of Silence", is the longest on the album, and features a choir, along with Anders' growlings (main singing style), speech and Lisa's vocals. It describes a misanthropic man who wishes to live away from all others and "die in silence", a theme which is also present in "The Solitude".

== Track listing ==
- All songs were written by Anders Jacobsson and Johan Ericson, except where noted.

No.	Title	Length
1.	"The Cry of Silence"	12:44
2.	"Silent Winter"	4:59
3.	"A Slumber Did My Spirit Seal" (Magnus Bergström, Thomas Jäger, lyrics by William Wordsworth)	4:11
4.	"The Solitude" (lyrics by Susanne Arvidsson)	7:56
5.	"Reversio ad Secessum"	7:33
6.	"The Amaranth"	5:22
7.	"Akherousia"	2:34
8.	"It Grieves My Heart"	7:30
Total length:		52:49

== Personnel ==
- Anders Jacobsson – vocals
- Lisa Johansson – vocals
- Johan Ericson – lead guitar, rhythm guitar
- Magnus Bergström – rhythm guitar
- Thomas Jäger – bass
- Anders Karlsson – programming, synthesizer
- Jerry Torstensson – drums, guitar on "Akherousia", percussion

=== Additional personnel ===
- Olof Götlin – violin
- Christophe Szpajdel - logo, typography
- Maya Hallström - photography (band)
- Thomas Färngren - mastering
- Manne Engström - engineering (assistant)
- Henrik Lyknert - engineering (assistant)
- Chris Silver - producer, engineering, mastering
- Travis Smith - cover art, layout
- Susanne Arvidsson - lyrics for "The Solitude"
