= Major Arcana (Novembers Doom album) =

Studio album by Novembers Doom
- Released: September 19, 2025
- Genre: Death-doom, progressive death metal, gothic metal
- Length: 56:36
- Label: Prophecy Productions

Novembers Doom chronology
| Nephilim Grove (2019) | Major Arcana (2025) |

Professional ratings
Review scores
| Source | Rating |
|---|---|
| Blabbermouth.net | 8/10 |
| AngryMetalGuy | 3/5 stars |
| Metal Storm | 7.8/10 |

Major Arcana is the twelfth studio album by the American death-doom band Novembers Doom. The album was released on September 19, 2025 via Prophecy Productions.

== Track listing ==
| No. | Title | Length |
|---|---|---|
| 1. | "June" | 1:57 |
| 2. | "Major Arcana" | 6:37 |
| 3. | "Ravenous" | 6:27 |
| 4. | "Mercy" | 5:55 |
| 5. | "The Dance" | 5:42 |
| 6. | "The Fool" | 5:47 |
| 7. | "Bleed Static" | 8:00 |
| 8. | "Chatter" | 5:20 |
| 9. | "Dusking Day" | 5:25 |
| 10. | "XXII" | 5:26 |
| Total length: | | 56:36 |

== Personnel ==
Novembers Doom

- Paul Kuhr – vocals
- Lawrence Roberts – guitars, vocals
- Vito Marchese – guitars
- Mike Feldman – bass guitar
- Garry Naples – drums

Additional personnel

- Dan Swanö – mixing, mastering
- STRXart – cover art
