= Sovran =

Studio album by Draconian
- Released: 30 October 2015
- Recorded: 2012–2014
- Genre: Gothic metal, death-doom
- Length: 67:34
- Label: Napalm
- Producer: Johan Ericson, Draconian, David Castillo (co-producer), Jakob Hermann (co-producer)

Draconian chronology
A Rose for the Apocalypse (2011)	Sovran (2015)	Under a Godless Veil (2020)

Singles from Sovran
- 1. "Stellar Tombs" Released: 5 October 2015; 2. "Rivers Between Us" Released: 16 October 2015

Sovran is the sixth studio album by Swedish gothic metal band Draconian, released on 30 October 2015 through Napalm Records. It's the first album with new singer Heike Langhans (:LOR3L3I:, REMINA) after the departure of Lisa Johansson in 2011. It's also the last album to feature bassist Fredrik Johansson, who left the band in April 2016.

A music video for "Stellar Tombs" was released on 29 January 2016.

== Track listing ==
All lyrics are written by Anders Jacobsson except where noted; all music is composed by Johan Ericson.

No.	Title	Length
1.	"Heavy Lies the Crown"	6:39
2.	"The Wretched Tide"	6:09
3.	"Pale Tortured Blue"	6:14
4.	"Stellar Tombs"	6:02
5.	"No Lonelier Star"	7:50
6.	"Dusk Mariner" (Heike Langhans, Anders Jacobsson)	8:00
7.	"Dishearten" (Heike Langhans, Anders Jacobsson)	6:37
8.	"Rivers Between Us"	6:48
9.	"The Marriage of Attaris" (Heike Langhans, Anders Jacobsson)	8:54
Total length:		63:13

Limited digipak bonus track
No.	Title	Length
10.	"With Love and Defiance"	4:21
Total length:		67:34

== Personnel ==
- Heike Langhans – clean vocals
- Anders Jacobsson – unclean vocals
- Johan Ericson – lead guitar, backing vocals
- Daniel Arvidsson – rhythm guitar
- Fredrik Johansson – bass
- Jerry Torstensson – drums, percussion
- Daniel Änghede (of Crippled Black Phoenix) – Clean vocals on "Rivers Between Us".

Production

- Arranged and produced by Johan Ericson and Draconian, co-produced by David Castillo and Jakob Hermann.
