= In Somnolent Ruin =

Studio album by Draconian
- Released: 8 May 2026
- Genres: Gothic metal, doom metal
- Length: 57:54
- Label: Napalm

Draconian chronology
Under a Godless Veil (2020)	In Somnolent Ruin (2026)

Professional ratings
Review scores
Source	Rating
Blabbermouth	8.5/10
Distorted Sound	8/10
Heavymetal.dk	9/10
Metal Hammer Germany	5/7 stars
Metal.de	8/10
Metal1.info	8.5/10
Metalitalia.com	7.5/10
Powermetal.de	10/10
Rock Hard	7.5/10
Soundi	3/5 stars

In Somnolent Ruin is the eighth studio album by Swedish gothic metal band Draconian, released on 8 May 2026 through Napalm Records.

== Track list ==
1. "I Welcome Thy Arrow" – 7:59
2. "The Monochrome Blade" – 7:01
3. "Anima" – 6:30
4. "The Face of God" – 7:36
5. "I Gave You Wings" – 7:29
6. "Asteria Beneath the Tranquil Sea" – 2:30
7. "Cold Heavens" – 5:13
8. "Misanthrope River" – 6:25
9. "Lethe" – 7:11
