= A Rose for the Apocalypse =

- Cover art by Seth Siro Anton

Studio album by Draconian
- Released: 23 June 2011
- Genre: Gothic metal, death-doom
- Length: 59:38
- Label: Napalm
- Producer: Draconian, Jens Bogren

Draconian chronology
Turning Season Within (2008)	A Rose for the Apocalypse (2011)	Sovran (2015)

Singles from A Rose for the Apocalypse
- 1. "The Last Hour of Ancient Sunlight" Released: 17 June 2011

A Rose for the Apocalypse is the fifth studio album by Swedish gothic metal band Draconian, released 23 June 2011 through Napalm Records.

A music video was made for the track "The Last Hour of Ancient Sunlight".

== Track listing ==
All tracks are written by Anders Jacobsson and Johan Ericson, except where noted.

No.	Title	Length
1.	"The Drowning Age"	7:18
2.	"The Last Hour of Ancient Sunlight"	5:26
3.	"End of the Rope" (Jacobsson, Ericson, Erik Arvidsson)	6:34
4.	"Elysian Night"	7:52
5.	"Deadlight"	6:32
6.	"Dead World Assembly"	5:52
7.	"A Phantom Dissonance"	5:39
8.	"The Quiet Storm"	6:37
9.	"The Death of Hours" (Jacobsson, Ericson, E. Arvidsson)	7:48
10.	"Wall of Sighs" (limited digipak bonus track)	5:14
Total length:		62:51

== Personnel ==
- Lisa Johansson – clean vocals
- Anders Jacobsson – unclean vocals
- Johan Ericson – lead guitar, backing vocals
- Daniel Arvidsson – rhythm guitar
- Fredrik Johansson – bass
- Jerry Torstensson – drums, percussion

Production

- Arranged and produced by Draconian
- Recorded and engineered by David Castillo & Johan Ornborg
- Mixed and mastered by Jens Bogren
