= Atra Mors =

Studio album by Evoken
- Released: July 31, 2012
- Recorded: 2012
- Genre: Funeral doom, death-doom
- Length: 67:11
- Label: Profound Lore

Evoken chronology
A Caress of the Void (2007)	Atra Mors (2012)	Hypnagogia (2018)

Professional ratings
Aggregate scores
Source	Rating
Metacritic	82/100
Review scores
Source	Rating
About.com	4.5/5 stars
Allmusic	4/5 stars
Blistering	9/10 stars
Chronicles of Chaos	7/10 stars
Exclaim!	positive
Pitchfork	7.7/10
PopMatters	8/10 stars
ThisIsNotAScene	9/10 stars

Atra Mors is the fifth full-length studio album by American doom metal band Evoken. It was released through Profound Lore Records on July 31, 2012. Five years after previous studio album A Caress of the Void and also 100th release from Profound Lore. The name Atra Mors is Latin for "Black Death".

== Critical reception ==
Atra Mors has received "Universal acclaim" based on 4 critics at Metacritic.

== Track listing ==
No.	Title	Length
1.	"Atra Mors"	11:55
2.	"Descent into Chaotic Dream"	11:14
3.	"A Tenebrous Vision"	2:20
4.	"Grim Eloquence"	9:40
5.	"An Extrinsic Divide"	10:12
6.	"Requies Aeterna"	1:59
7.	"The Unechoing Dread"	9:48
8.	"Into Aphotic Devastation"	10:07
Total length:		67:11

== Personnel ==
- John Paradiso – guitar, vocals
- Chris Molinari – guitar
- Dave Wagner – bass
- Vince Verkay – drums
- Don Zaros – keyboards
