= Quietus (disambiguation) =

Titus Fulvius Iunius Quietus (died 261) was a Roman usurper.

Quietus (Latin for "calm" or "at rest") may also refer to:

== People ==
- Lusius Quietus, Roman general and governor
- Titus Avidius Quietus, Roman politician

== Media ==
=== Literature ===
- Quietus, a 1940 short sci-fi story by Ross Rocklynne
- Quietus, a 1979 short story by Orson Scott Card
- "Quietus", the name of a mass-drowning ceremony in the 1992 novel The Children of Men
  - "Quietus", the name of a suicide kit in the 2006 film adaptation, Children of Men

=== Music ===
- Quietus (album), a 2001 album by the doom metal band Evoken
- Quietus (Silent Reverie), a song from the 2005 album Consign to Oblivion by Epica
- The Quietus, a British online music and pop culture magazine

== See also ==
- Lactarius quietus, a species of mushroom
- Quietus, a spell used in the Harry Potter series of books
- "Quietus", a vampiric discipline from the Assamite clan in the role-playing game Vampire: the Masquerade
- "Quietus", a branch of the organization Contact in Iain M. Bank's fictional universe
- "Quietus", a sword from the 1995 video game Hexen: Beyond Heretic
- "Quietus", the lighthouse planet, is a setting in the comic series Saga
- Dying
