= Major Arcana (disambiguation) =

The Major Arcana are the named cards in a cartomantic tarot pack.

Major Arcana may also refer to:

- Major Arcana (Speedy Ortiz album), 2013
- Major Arcana (Novembers Doom album), 2025
- Maior Arcana: The Words That Turn Flesh into Light, 1998 album by Lux Occulta
