= The Pale Haunt Departure =

Studio album by Novembers Doom
- Released: March 8, 2005
- Genre: Death-doom, gothic metal
- Length: 51:43
- Label: The End
- Producer: Novembers Doom, Chris Wisco

Novembers Doom chronology
To Welcome the Fade (2002)	The Pale Haunt Departure (2005)	The Novella Reservoir (2007)

Professional ratings
Review scores
Source	Rating
AllMusic	4/5 stars
Blabbermouth.net	8.5/10
Chronicles of Chaos	10/10
Exclaim!	favorable
Metal Storm	9/10

The Pale Haunt Departure is the fifth studio album by the American death-doom band Novembers Doom. The album was released in March 8, 2005. On this album the band shifted styles towards a more straightforward death metal sound with a gothic metal influence. Two music videos were made for this album. One for "The Pale Haunt Departure" and the other for "Autumn Reflection."

== Track listing ==
No.	Title	Length
1.	"The Pale Haunt Departure"	5:44
2.	"Swallowed by the Moon"	5:57
3.	"Autumn Reflection"	6:06
4.	"Dark World Burden"	6:09
5.	"In the Absence of Grace"	8:09
6.	"The Dead Leaf Echo"	7:30
7.	"Through a Child's Eyes"	5:32
8.	"Collapse of the Falling Throe"	6:36
Total length:		51:43

== Personnel ==
- Paul Kuhr - vocals
- Joe Nunez - drums
- Mike Legros - bass
- Vito Marchese - guitars
- Larry Roberts - guitars, keyboards

=== Additional personnel and staff ===
- Tommy Crucianelli - keyboards
- Eric Burnley - keyboards
- Dan Swanö - lead guitar on "Dark World Burden", mixing
- Attila Kis - design, illustration
- James Murphy - mastering
- Chris Wisco - producer, engineering, editing
- Mark Coatsworth - photography
