= Apocalypsis Damnare =

- Artwork for the 2005 re-recorded version.

Studio album by Rigor Sardonicous
- Released: 1999
- Genre: Doom metal; funeral doom; death metal
- Length: 47:28
- Label: Paragon Records

Rigor Sardonicous chronology
Risus Ex Mortuus (1994)	Apocalypsis Damnare (1999)	Principia Sardonica (2004)

Apocalypsis Damnare (Latin for "Revelation Give a Damn") is the debut album by American doom metal band Rigor Sardonicous. It was released in 1999.

A remade version of the album was released in 2005 under the label Smiling Death Records, featuring two different bass players.

== Track listing ==
No.	Title	Translation	Length
1.	"Exordium"	Introduction	3:44
2.	"Apocalipsis Damnare"	Revelation Give a Damn	7:03
3.	"Pandemic"		6:59
4.	"Human Rot"		5:54
5.	"Saprophyte"		5:58
6.	"Holy Suicide"		3:48
7.	"Misery"		6:28
8.	"The Deathless Sol"		7:28
Total length:			47:28

== Critical reception ==
Professional ratings
Review scores
Source	Rating
Allmusic	2.5/5 stars
Blabbermouth.net	5.5/10 stars
The Gauntlet	3/5 stars

Considered extreme even within a musical style defined by extremism this is about as uplifting as a post-genocide funeral procession.

== Personnel ==
- Joseph J. Fogarazzo – guitars, vocals
- Glenn Hampton – vocals, guitars, bass
- Steve Moran – session bass (ex-Evoken)
