= Hamartia (album) =

Studio album by Novembers Doom
- Released: April 14, 2017
- Genre: Death-doom, progressive death metal, gothic metal
- Length: 56:43
- Label: The End
- Producer: Novembers Doom, Chris Djuricic

Novembers Doom chronology
| Bled White (2014) | Hamartia (2017) | Nephilim Grove (2019) |

Professional ratings
Review scores
| Source | Rating |
|---|---|
| AllMusic | 4/5 stars |
| Angrymetalguy | 3.5/5 stars |
| NoCleanSinging | favorable |

Hamartia is the tenth studio album by the American death-doom band Novembers Doom. The album was released on April 14, 2017 via The End Records. It marks the first time in the band's existence to have the same line up on two consecutive albums. Hamartia, in literature, is the flaw in character which leads to the downfall of the protagonist in a tragedy, particularly in ancient Greek ones.

== Track listing ==
| No. | Title | Length |
|---|---|---|
| 1. | "Devils Light" | 5:05 |
| 2. | "Plague Bird" | 5:21 |
| 3. | "Ghost" | 5:32 |
| 4. | "Ever After" | 5:56 |
| 5. | "Hamartia" | 3:35 |
| 6. | "Apostasy" | 4:19 |
| 7. | "Miasma" | 5:38 |
| 8. | "Zephyr" | 6:28 |
| 9. | "Waves in the Red Cloth" | 5:38 |
| 10. | "Borderline" | 9:03 |
| Total length: | | 56:43 |

== Personnel ==
Novembers Doom

- Paul Kuhr – vocals
- Lawrence Roberts – guitars
- Vito Marchese – guitars
- Mike Feldman – bass guitar
- Garry Naples – drums

Additional personnel

- Ben Johnson – keyboards
- Rhiannon Kuhr – additional vocals on tracks 4,7 and 8
- Bernt Fjellestad – additional vocals
- Eugen Poe – artwork
- Dan Swanö – mastering, mixing, additional vocals
- Chris Djuricic – digital editing, engineering, producing
- Roanna Zoe – photography
