= Principia Sardonica =

Studio album by Rigor Sardonicous
- Released: 2004
- Genre: Doom metal, funeral doom, death-doom
- Length: 61:41
- Label: Paragon Records

Rigor Sardonicous chronology
| Apocalypsis Damnare (1999) | Principia Sardonica (2004) | Vallis Ex Umbra De Mortuus (2008) |

Principia Sardonica is the second studio album by the American heavy metal band Rigor Sardonicous. It was released in 2004 on Paragon Records and is the band's first full-length album in 5 years. The album contains the 15-minute track "Possession".

== Track listing ==
| No. | Title | Translation | Length |
|---|---|---|---|
| 1. | "In Autumn Twillight" | | 3:43 |
| 2. | "The Dead" | | 7:04 |
| 3. | "Sleepless" | | 5:37 |
| 4. | "Risus Ex Mortuus" | The Laughter Died | 8:03 |
| 5. | "Phases of Death" (instrumental) | | 6:57 |
| 6. | "Wall of Darkness" | | 6:52 |
| 7. | "Soulless Extinction" (Dimentianon cover) | | 8:19 |
| 8. | "Possession" | | 15:04 |
| Total length: | | | 61:41 |

== Personnel ==
- Joseph J. Fogarazzo – guitars, vocals
- Glenn Hampton – vocals, guitars, bass
