= Säffle Municipality =

Säffle Municipality Säffle kommun
- Municipality
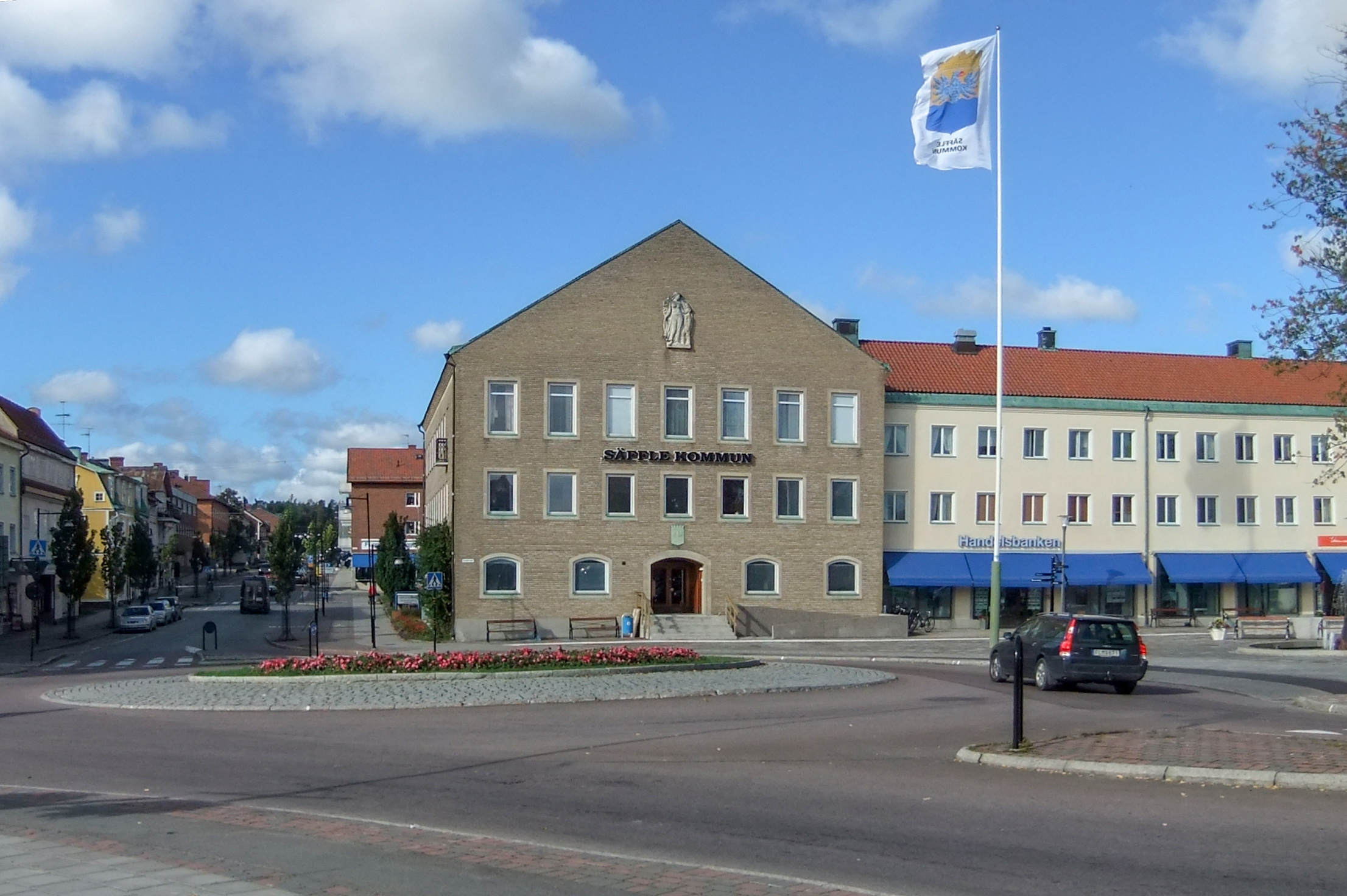

- Coat of arms

- Coordinates: 59°08′N 12°56′E
- Country: Sweden
- County: Värmland County
- Seat: Säffle

Area
  - Total: 2,497.51 km^{2} (964.29 sq mi)
  - Land: 1,220.78 km^{2} (471.35 sq mi)
  - Water: 1,276.73 km^{2} (492.95 sq mi)
- Area as of 1 January 2014.

Population (30 June 2025)
  - Total: 14,827
  - Density: 12.146/km^{2} (31.457/sq mi)
- Time zone: UTC+1 (CET)
  - Summer (DST): UTC+2 (CEST)
- ISO 3166 code: SE
- Province: Värmland and Dalsland
- Municipal code: 1785
- Website: www.saffle.se

Säffle Municipality (Swedish: Säffle kommun) is a municipality in Värmland County in west central Sweden. Its seat is located in the city of Säffle.

Säffle was the last local government unit in Sweden to get the title of a city, in 1951. In 1952 the system with different types of municipalities was made obsolete, but it formally existed until 1971. The present municipality was created in that year, when the city was amalgamated with the surrounding rural municipalities.

The municipality covers a peninsula in Lake Vänern (Värmlandsnäs), and has a large fresh water archipelago.

== Värmlandsnäs ==
Värmlandsnäs, also called Näset, is a big and important part of the municipality. The area which reaches out into the middle of Lake Vänern as a big peninsula is very significant to the economy by the produce of pork. The area supplies more than 200,000 people with pork.

Näset also has an archipelago on the east side. The boat people talk very well of Millesvik Archipelago (Millesviks skärgård), which also has a lot of old runestones and other ancient monuments.

From Ekenäs harbor you can take the tourist boat to Lurö, a small island in Lake Vänern. At Lurö you can dine and stay over night.

Lake Vänern, accessible from Värmlandsnäs, is locally popular for recreation during the summer. Ekenäs is centrally located, providing access to Lurö and other local points. Other bathing places include Ekôrn and Örud near Örö harbor (Örö hamn).

== Localities ==
- Säffle, pop. 9,500 (seat)
- Värmlandsbro, 630
- Svanskog, ca 600
- Nysäter, ca 200
- Hulta

== Demographics ==
This is a demographic table based on Säffle Municipality's electoral districts in the 2022 Swedish general election sourced from SVT's election platform, in turn taken from SCB official statistics.

In total there were 15,390 residents, including 11,665 Swedish citizens of voting age. 42.7% voted for the left coalition and 56.2% for the right coalition. Indicators are in percentage points except population totals and income.

Location	Residents	Citizen adults	Left vote	Right vote	Employed	Swedish parents	Foreign heritage	Income SEK	Degree
Location			%	%					
Annelund	2,212	1,730	40.6	59.1	81	88	12	25,029	24
Höglunda	2,198	1,515	48.3	49.9	67	72	28	20,926	29
Nysäter	1,329	1,063	37.4	61.7	80	91	9	21,575	30
Svaneholm	991	760	38.2	61.3	80	91	9	21,198	22
Tegnér	2,297	1,697	45.0	54.2	77	84	16	24,712	35
Tingvalla	2,513	1,969	44.6	54.1	74	82	18	21,577	27
Trätälja	1,620	1,167	52.1	46.1	58	66	34	18,040	23
Värmlandsnäs N	1,233	977	37.4	61.3	79	93	7	22,873	22
Värmlandsnäs S	997	787	32.9	66.4	84	92	8	24,231	30
Source: SVT

== International relations ==
=== Twin towns — Sister cities ===
Säffle Municipality is twinned with:

(Norway)	Hol, Norway
(Denmark)	Tørring, Denmark
(Finland)	Mäntyharju, Finland
(Estonia)	Antsla, Estonia
