= Vallis Ex Umbra De Mortuus =

Studio album by Rigor Sardonicous
- Released: January 4, 2008
- Genre: Doom metal, funeral doom, death-doom
- Length: 38:58
- Label: Paragon Records

Rigor Sardonicous chronology
Principia Sardonica (2004)	Vallis Ex Umbra De Mortuus (2008)	Ego Diligio Vos (2012)

Vallis Ex Umbra De Mortuus (Latin for "The Valley of the Shadow of Death") is the third studio album by the American funeral doom band Rigor Sardonicous. It was released in 2008 on Paragon Records.

The album's vinyl edition contains a cover of the song "Mad World" by English pop rock band Tears for Fears.

Professional ratings
Review scores
Source	Rating
Encyclopedia Metallum	7/10 stars
Diabolical Conquest	(8.1/10)

== Track listing ==
No.	Title	Translation	Length
1.	"Mane De Maeroris"	On the Morning of Grief	1:33
2.	"Siens Somnium"	Siena Dream	7:02
3.	"Incompertus quod Anon"	The Unknown	5:28
4.	"Laudare Apocalypsis"	Revelation Praise	4:22
5.	"Alveus De Somnus"	The Reservoir's Sleep	4:18
6.	"Prophecies I - Preapocalyptica"		4:00
7.	"Agony"		6:23
8.	"Rex Regis Fortuna"	The King Rules	5:52
Total length:			38:58

=== Vinyl bonus track ===
No.	Title	Music	Length
9.	"Mad World" (Tears for Fears cover)	Roland Orzabal	5:20
Total length:			44:18

== Personnel ==
- Joseph J. Fogarazzo – guitars, vocals
- Glenn Hampton – vocals, guitars, bass
