= Johan Borgert =

Swedish singer

Leif Johan Borgert (born 8 July 1978 in Säffle) is a Swedish singer and performer.

== Discography ==
Album

- Johan Borgert (2003)
- Johan Borgert & Holy Madre (2004)
- Holy Madre (2006)
- Nu är jag ett as (2010)

Singles

- "Skott i hjärtat" (som sångare i Scott) (1997)
- "Fabriksslavarna" (2002)
- "Smal" (2003)
- "Jag tror jag heter Daniel ikväll" (2004)
- "Du ville betyda något för någon" (2005)
- "Hot om sex" (2010)
- "Smalfilm" (2010)
