= The Burning Halo =

Studio album by Draconian
- Released: 29 September 2006
- Genre: Gothic metal, death-doom
- Length: 53:56
- Label: Napalm
- Producer: Johan Ericson, Andreas Karlsson

Draconian chronology
Arcane Rain Fell (2005)	The Burning Halo (2006)	Turning Season Within (2008)

Professional ratings
Review scores
Source	Rating
Allmusic	3.5/5 stars
Lords of Metal	9.6/10 stars
Sea of Tranquility	4/5 stars
Metal Review	10/10 stars

The Burning Halo is the third studio album by Swedish gothic metal band Draconian. The album was released through Napalm Records on 29 September 2006 (10 October 2006 in the United States). It consists of three original songs (tracks 1–3), three redone demos from The Closed Eyes of Paradise (tracks 4–6), and two covers of songs from the 1970s (tracks 7 & 8).

== Track listing ==
No.	Title	Length
1.	"She Dies"	7:28
2.	"Through Infectious Waters (A Sickness Elegy)"	8:04
3.	"The Dying"	9:48
4.	"Serenade of Sorrow" (2006 version)	5:00
5.	"The Morningstar" (2006 version)	8:01
6.	"The Gothic Embrace" (2006 version)	8:34
7.	"On Sunday They Will Kill the World" (Ekseption cover)	4:12
8.	"Forever My Queen" (Pentagram cover)	2:49
Total length:		53:56

== Personnel ==
- Lisa Johansson – clean vocals
- Anders Jacobsson – unclean vocals
- Johan Ericson – lead and rhythm guitars, producer
- Daniel Arvidsson – guitars
- Andreas Karlsson – keyboards, programming, producer
- Fredrik Johansson – bass
- Jerry Torstensson – drums, percussion

=== Additional personnel ===
- Zdrite Romeo – photography
- Fredrik Karlsson – photography
- Theres Björk – photography
- Peter in de Betou – mastering
- Travis Smith – artwork
- Anders Bergström – mixing
