= Embrace the Emptiness =

Studio album by Evoken
- Released: October 1998
- Recorded: WAVE Studio, April–May 1998
- Genre: Funeral doom, death-doom
- Length: 70:35
- Label: Elegy Records; Solitude Productions (2006)
- Producer: Evoken

Evoken chronology
Embrace the Emptiness (1998)	Quietus (2001)

Professional ratings
Review scores
Source	Rating
Allmusic	3/5 stars

Embrace the Emptiness is the debut album by Evoken. Originally released in 1998 by Elegy Records. It was re-released by Solitude Productions in 2006 with a new layout.

== Track listing ==
No.	Title	Length
1.	"Intro"	3:22
2.	"Tragedy Eternal"	9:52
3.	"Chime the Centuries End"	9:45
4.	"Lost Kingdom of Darkness"	11:52
5.	"Ascend into the Maelstrom"	9:53
6.	"To Sleep Eternally"	12:49
7.	"Curse the Sunrise"	12:57
Total length:		70:35

== Credits ==
- John Paradiso – Guitars/Vocals
- Nick Orlando – Guitars
- Steve Moran – Bass
- Vince Verkay – Drums
- Dario Derna – Keyboards
- Charles Lamb – Session Cello
