= Antithesis of Light =

Studio album by Evoken
- Released: February 28, 2005
- Recorded: Hermit Hole – Kendall Park, NJ; March to November 2004.
- Genre: Funeral doom
- Length: 71:41
- Label: Avantgarde Music
- Producer: Evoken and Bumblefoot

Evoken chronology
Quietus (2001)	Antithesis of Light (2005)	A Caress of the Void (2007)

Professional ratings
Review scores
Source	Rating
Allmusic	4.5/5 stars

Antithesis of Light is the third studio album by American funeral doom band Evoken, released on February 28, 2005.

== Track listing ==
No.	Title	Length
1.	"Intro"	0:50
2.	"In Solitary Ruin"	10:44
3.	"Accursed Premonition"	12:33
4.	"The Mournful Refusal"	13:30
5.	"Pavor Nocturnus"	10:47
6.	"Antithesis of Light"	12:17
7.	"The Last of Vitality"	11:00
Total length:		71:41

== Credits ==
- John Paradiso – vocals, guitars, bass
- Nick Orlando – guitars
- Vince Verkay – drums
- Denny Hahn – keyboards
- Chris Kuffner – session cello
