= Fredrik Johansson =

Fredrik Johansson may refer to:

- Fredrik Johansson (ice hockey) (born 1984), Swedish professional ice hockey centre
- Fredrik Johansson (cyclist) (born 1978), Swedish professional racing cyclist
- Fredrik Johansson (electronic sports player) (born 1984), a.k.a. MaDFroG, Swedish WarCraft III player
- Fredrik Johansson (bandy) (born 1984), Swedish bandy player
- Fredrik Johansson (orienteer) (born 1986), Swedish orienteering competitor
- Fredrik Johansson (speedway rider), a Swedish ice speedway rider, see 2010 Individual Ice Racing World Championship
- Fredrik Johansson (ski jumper) (born 1974), Swedish Olympic ski jumper
- Fredrik Johansson (Holby City), a fictional character from British medical drama Holby City
- Fredrik Johansson (1974–2022), Swedish musician, former guitarist of Dark Tranquillity
- Fredrik Edvard Johansson (1871–1918), Finnish violinist
