= Värmlandsbro =

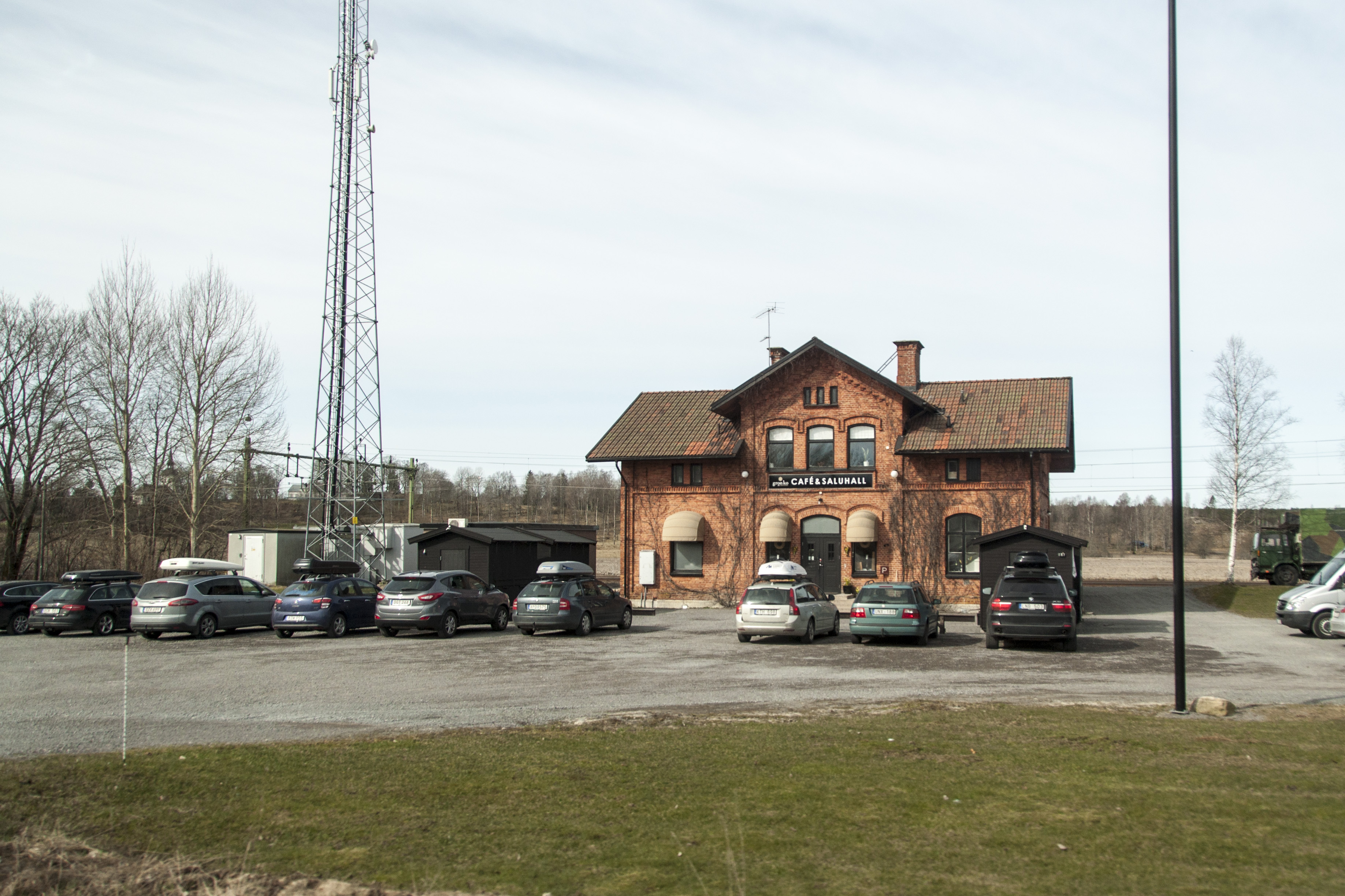
- Värmlandsbro station

- Location within Sweden
- Coordinates: 59°11′N 13°01′E
- Country: Sweden
- Province: Värmland
- County: Värmland County
- Municipality: Säffle Municipality

Area
  - Total: 0.86 km^{2} (0.33 sq mi)

Population (31 December 2010)
  - Total: 501
  - Density: 582/km^{2} (1,510/sq mi)
- Time zone: UTC+1 (CET)
  - Summer (DST): UTC+2 (CEST)

Värmlandsbro is a locality situated in Säffle Municipality, Värmland County, Sweden with 501 inhabitants in 2010.
