= Anders Jacobsson =

Anders Jacobsson may refer to:

- Anders Jacobsson, a Swedish writer (see Anders Jacobsson and Sören Olsson)
- Anders Jacobsson, a Swedish musician, vocalist in Draconian

== See also ==
- Anders Jacobsen (disambiguation)
