= Anders Jacobsen =

Anders Jacobsen may refer to:

- Anders Jacobsen (ski jumper) (born 1985), Norwegian ski jumper
- Anders Jacobsen (footballer) (born 1968), Norwegian football player and manager
- Anders K. Jacobsen (born 1989), Danish football player
- Anders Post Jacobsen (born 1985), Danish football player

== See also ==
- Anders Jacobsson (disambiguation)
