= A Caress of the Void =

Studio album by Evoken
- Released: November 8, 2007
- Genre: Funeral doom
- Length: 61:28
- Label: I Hate
- Producer: Evoken

Evoken chronology
Antithesis of Light (2005)	A Caress of the Void (2007)	Atra Mors (2012)

Professional ratings
Review scores
Source	Rating
Allmusic	4/5 stars

A Caress of the Void is the fourth studio album by American doom metal band Evoken. It was released on November 8, 2007.

== Track listing ==
No.	Title	Length
1.	"A Caress of the Void"	8:52
2.	"Mare Erythraeum"	7:19
3.	"Of Purest Absolution"	7:46
4.	"Astray in Eternal Night"	8:37
5.	"Descend the Lifeless Womb"	9:12
6.	"Suffer a Martyr's Trial (Procession at Dusk)"	13:46
7.	"Orogeny"	6:06
Total length:		61:28

== Credits ==
- John Paradiso – Guitars/Vocals, Keyboards
- Nick Orlando – Guitars
- Craig Pillard – Bass
- Vince Verkay – Drums
