= Svanskog =

- Location within Sweden
- Coordinates: 59°10′N 12°33′E
- Country: Sweden
- Province: Värmland
- County: Värmland County
- Municipality: Säffle Municipality

Area
  - Total: 1.53 km^{2} (0.59 sq mi)

Population (31 December 2010)
  - Total: 510
  - Density: 333/km^{2} (860/sq mi)
- Time zone: UTC+1 (CET)
  - Summer (DST): UTC+2 (CEST)

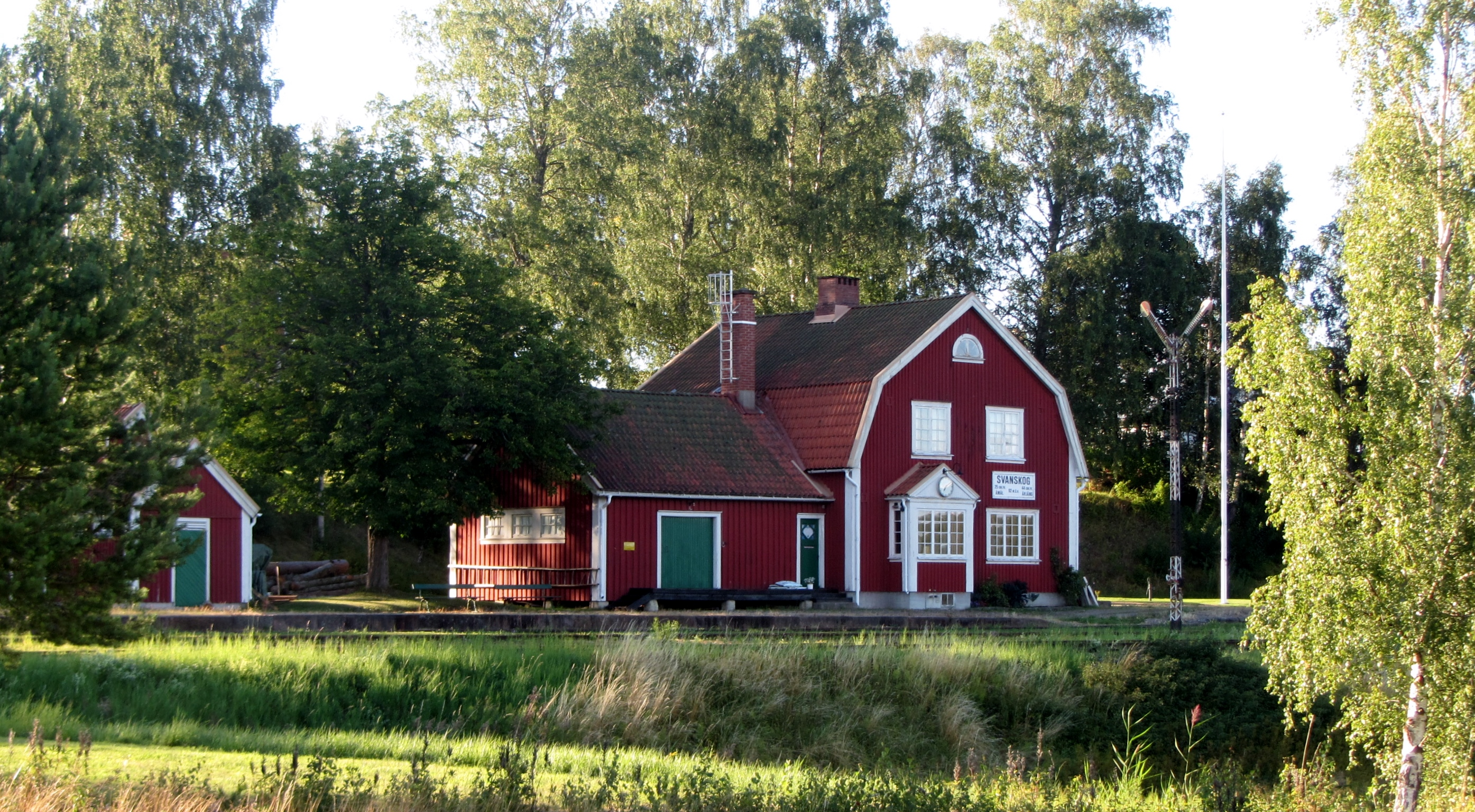
Svanskog station house, currently a railway museum for the Svanskog Line.

Svanskog is a locality situated in Säffle Municipality, Värmland County, Sweden with 510 inhabitants in 2010.
