= Arcane Rain Fell =

Studio album by Draconian
- Released: 24 January 2005
- Recorded: September 2004 at Studio Underground
- Genres: Gothic metal, death-doom
- Length: 60:26
- Label: Napalm

Draconian chronology
Where Lovers Mourn (2003)	Arcane Rain Fell (2005)	The Burning Halo (2006)

Professional ratings
Review scores
Source	Rating
Allmusic	3/5 stars
Metal Storm	4.5/5 stars

Arcane Rain Fell is the second studio album by Swedish gothic metal band Draconian. The album was released through Napalm Records on 24 January 2005. It was recorded and produced at Studio Underground.

The album is a concept album that details the fall of Lucifer from Heaven and the creation of Hell, featuring slow guitar riffs, soprano vocals, keyboards/piano, violins, cellos and growling vocals. All guitars on the album were performed by Johan Ericson.

"Death, Come Near Me" is a remake of a song off the 2002 "Dark Oceans We Cry" demo. "The Apostasy Canticle" was originally titled "The Wings of God".

== Track listing ==
All lyrics are written by Anders Jacobsson except where noted; all music is composed by Johan Ericson.

No.	Title	Length
1.	"A Scenery of Loss"	9:11
2.	"Daylight Misery"	5:31
3.	"The Apostasy Canticle"	9:51
4.	"Expostulation" (Ryan Henry)	2:05
5.	"Heaven Laid in Tears (Angels' Lament)"	6:54
6.	"The Abhorrent Rays"	5:32
7.	"The Everlasting Scar"	6:00
8.	"Death, Come Near Me"	15:22
Total length:		60:26

== Personnel ==
- Anders Jacobsson – Harsh vocals
- Lisa Johansson – clean vocals
- Johan Ericson – guitars, backing vocals
- Jerry Torstensson – drums, percussion
- Andreas Karlsson – keyboards, programming
- Jesper Stolpe – bass

=== Additional personnel ===
- Ryan Henry – narrative lines in some songs, full narration on "Expostulation"
- Peter in de Betou – mastering
- Pelle Saether – producer, engineering
- Madeleine Engström – photography
- Travis Smith – cover art, layout
