= Nysäter =

Village in Värmland County, Sweden

Coordinates: 59°16′40″N 12°47′37″E

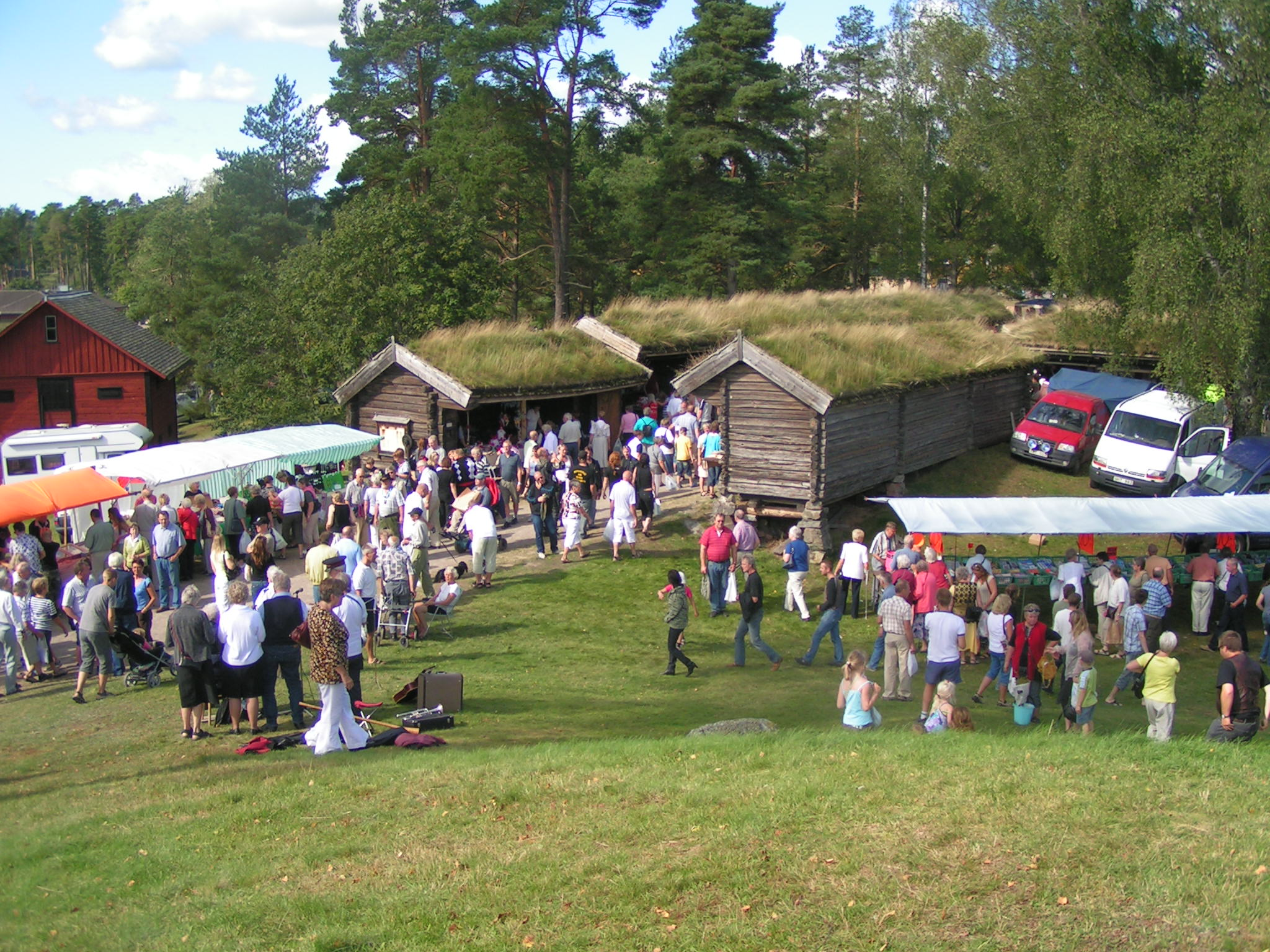
Market days in Nysäter (2007).

Nysäter, or Värmlands Nysäter, is a village in Värmland County, Sweden, located north of the city of Säffle. It belongs to Gillberga Parish.

The first inhabitants came to the place now called Nysäter 2000–1500 years ago. The sand ridge is a place where you can see traces of the prehistoric age and also Kungshöjden and the market-shop. Kungshöjden is a burial mound from 400 to 500 years ago. The market-shop is from 1750.

In 2010, Nysäter had 149 inhabitants. Despite that, there are both a school and a preschool there.

== History ==
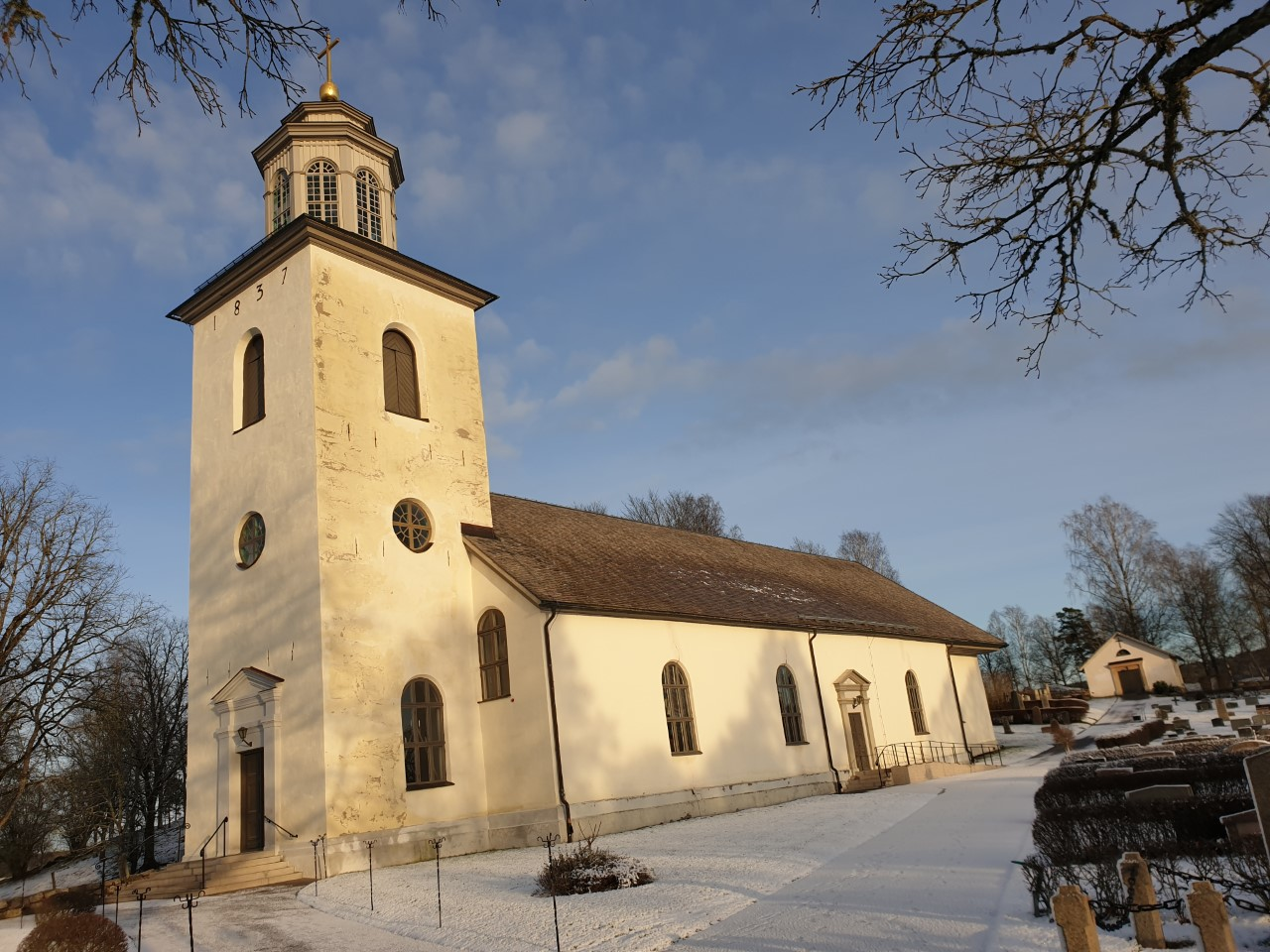
Gillberga Church

In 1678, Nysäter village was burned down. By 1700, the village consisted of seven farms. After that, it began to expand and more farms had begun to be built or bought as the market in Nysäter expanded. Nysäters Cottage was built in the middle of the 1800s. The squire, who owned the whole village, came to live there. This was the start of a new era of growth and modernization. Not long after, a dairy and tannery was built, as well as a bank office was constructed.

Gillberga was an independent county in Värmland from 1862 to 1970. Every inhabitant in Gillberga parish was invited to the first county meeting, but only landowners and people who had enough income had right to vote. Over the years changes were made, and finally all inhabitants of age had the right to vote.

== Geography ==
Gilberga parish is situated in an area that the geologists called Gillberga Skålen, because it has the shape of a bowl. There is a variety of rocks in the area. Grey-stone, granite and red gneiss are some of the rocks that can be found. The parish consisted long ago of high mountains and valleys, and it still does even though they are not that characteristic. The ground in the area has mainly been hardened due to processes in Prehistoric Times.

The farmland consists mostly of clayey soils because for many thousand years the ocean covered what now is Gilberga parish. The Ice Age affected the area, the ground was elevated from the ocean level and clay was left in this place as the ocean withdrew. An interesting finding from the Ice age are the big sand hill in Nysäter and Hasslerud. By the shore of the Gillberga lake, the water has been swirled the sand and done so that the rocks are round cut.

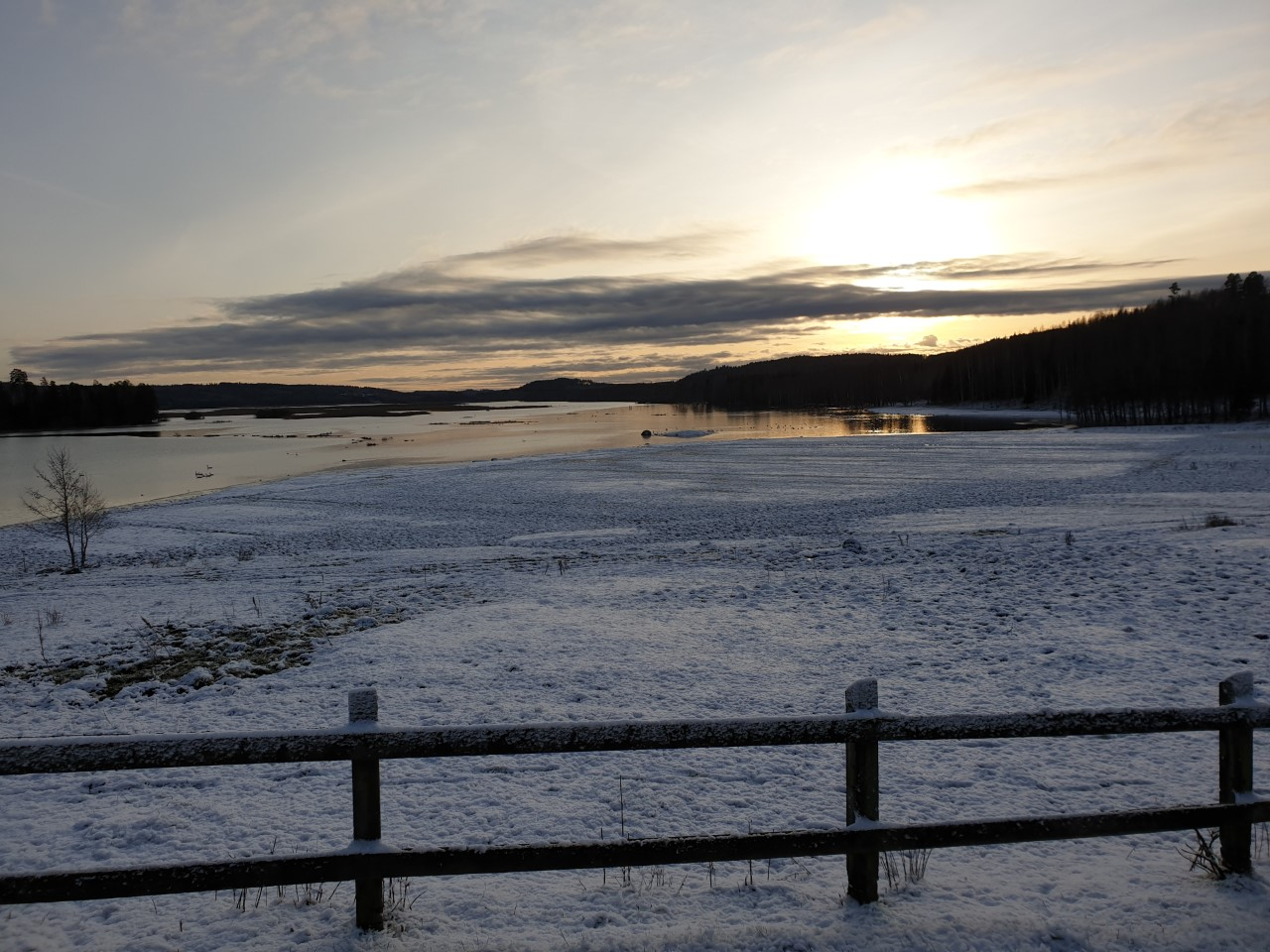
Gillberga Lake (2019)

== Gilberga lake ==
Gillberga lake is a 200-hectare nature reserve. In 1986, it became a nature reserve. The reserve is located south of Gilberga church. In March and the beginning of April, are the bird skylark there.
