= Rigor Sardonicous =

American doom metal band

- Origin: Long Island, New York, U.S.
- Genres: Funeral doom metal; death metal
- Years active: 1988–present
- Label: Paragon
- Members: Joseph Fogarazzo; Glenn Hampton
- Past members: Ryan Böhlmann; Gabe Madsen; Steve Moran
- Website: smilingdeath.com

Rigor Sardonicous is an American doom metal band from Long Island, New York. Coined as "raw, apocalyptic doom", Rigor Sardonicous is one of the earliest American doom metal bands that are still active today among Novembers Doom and Evoken. The band members came together in 1988. According to an interview, the band is influenced by slow parts of death metal bands like Obituary, Winter and Autopsy.

The band's name is Latin for "Rigid and sardonic"; the vast majority of their album and song titles are in Latin. However, the lyrics are still in English. On most of their recordings, the band uses a Boss DR-660 Dr. Rhythm drum machine.

== History ==
Rigor Sardonicous was formed in 1988 by bassist Glenn Hampton, before guitarist-vocalist Joseph J. Fogarazzo joined him in 1990. The band's debut album Apocalypsis Damnare was released in 1999, followed by a split album with The Forgotten in 2002 and then their second album Principia Sardonica in 2004.

In 2005, Apocalypsis Damnare was re-recorded and re-released via Paragon Records, while their demo, Risus Ex Mortuus, was re-recorded and re-released as a full-length album in 2006 by the Russian label Endless Desperation Records. In 2008, the band released its third album Vallis Ex Umbra De Mortuus, followed in 2012 by their fourth album Ego Diligio Vos. In 2011, a live album titled Vivescere Exitium was released on cassette format and was limited to 200 copies. The recordings came from a New York concert on August 14, 2009. The concert had also been available as a free download even since.

== Members ==
=== Current members ===
- Glenn Hampton – bass (1988–present)
- Joseph J. Fogarazzo – guitar, vocals (1990–present)

=== Past members ===
- Ryan Böhlmann – drums (session only)
- Gabe Madsen – drums (1988–1991)
- Steve Moran – bass (2004–2005)

== Discography ==
=== Studio albums ===
- Apocalypsis Damnare (CD, 1999, self-released, re-released by Paragon Records, 2005)
- Principia Sardonica (CD, 2004, Paragon Records)
- Vallis Ex Umbra De Mortuus (CD, LP, 2008, Paragon Records)
- Ego Diligio Vos (CD, 2012)
- Praeparet Bellum (CD, 2023)
- Diatriba Deorum (CD/Cassette - Remorseless Records, Digi - Meuse Music Records, Digi - Leçons des Ténèbres Productions (2026)

=== Demos ===
- Risus Ex Mortuus (cassette, 1994, self-released, re-released on CD by Endless Desperation, 2006)

=== Live albums ===
- Vivescere Exitium (live recording; free digital download off main website, Distoare Music, 2011)

=== EPs and splits ===
- The Forgotten / Rigor Sardonicous (7" split with The Forgotten, Paragon Records, 2002)
- Amores Defunctus Tuus Mater (CD split w/Dimentianon, Largactyl Records, 2007)
- I / Neo-pesaimism (7" split with Persistence in Mourning, Feudal Throne Records, 2010)
- Ridenti Mortis (digital EP, self-released, 2018)
