= Novembers Doom =

American death-doom band

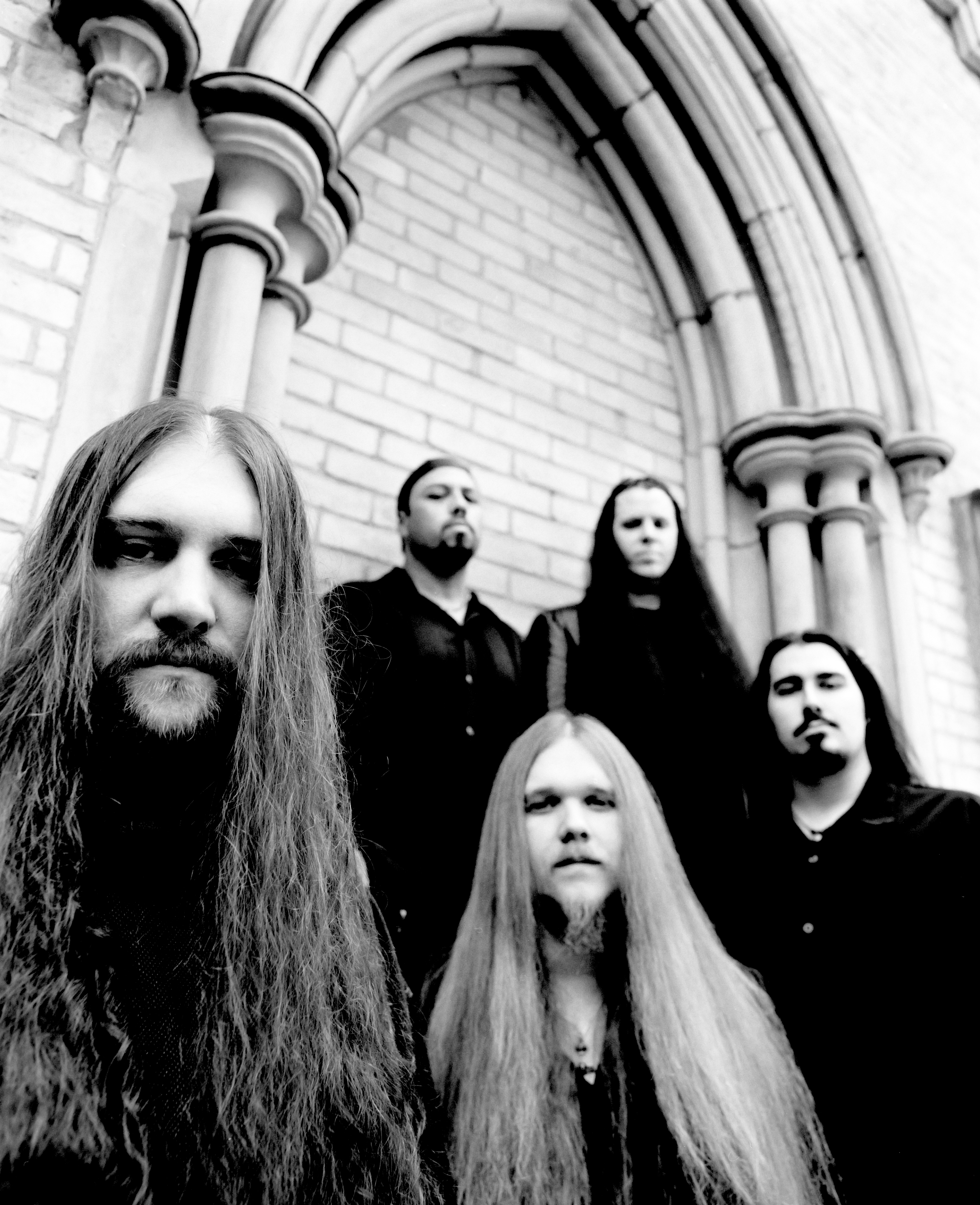
- Novembers Doom in 2005

Background information
- Origin: Chicago, Illinois, U.S.
- Genres: Death-doom, gothic metal, progressive death metal
- Years active: 1992–present
- Labels: Avantgarde, Dark Symphonies, Martyr Music Group, The End, Prophecy
- Members: Paul Kuhr; Lawrence Roberts; Vito Marchese; Mike Feldman; Garry Naples; George Lohan
- Past members: Mary Bielich; Eric Burnley; Emmet Hall; Cathy Jo Hejna; Joe Hernandez; Sasha Horn; Abbas Jaffary; Mike LeGros; Steve Nicholson; Joe Nunez; Brian Whited; Chris Wisco; Jason Armalius
- Website: novembersdoom.com

Novembers Doom is an American death-doom band from Chicago, currently signed to Prophecy Productions. Along with Evoken and Rigor Sardonicous, Novembers Doom is one of the earliest American death-doom bands still active today.

== History ==
=== Formation and early history ===
The origins of the band trace back to 1989 when they started out as the death-thrash metal band Laceration. Gradually, the band began to change their sound towards a heavier, slower style, at which point the name Novembers Doom was adopted as the band members felt it more suited their current direction. By 1992, the band was getting noticed in the metal underground for their dark heavy music on early demos (such as the "Scabs" demo, which was re-released as part of the Amid Its Hallowed Mirth remastered CD released in 2008).

Exploring and expanding, the band added female backing vocals and continued its thick, eerie brand of metal. An early 7-inch record deal with Regress Records, of Italy, allowed Avantgarde Music to hear the band. This recording was heavy, combined with moods of darkness and despair. The two songs would lead to the release of the band's full-length debut CD, Amid Its Hallowed Mirth on Avant Garde and Nuclear Blast in early 1995.

Shortly thereafter, the band had a lineup change, which would include Jim Bresnahan of Contagion, Cianide, Kommandant fame and a new two song demo was recorded, Her Tears Drop. A compilation track for Pavement Music soon followed. By 1996, the band found themselves having yet another major lineup overhaul, with vocalist Paul Kuhr and female vocalist Cathy Jo Hejna eventually being the only two original members left.

In 1997, the newly revamped and refocused lineup of Novembers Doom released the EP For Every Leaf That Falls. The disc was well received, leading to favorable reviews and response worldwide. This led to the band signing a new deal and releasing their second full-length album Of Sculptured Ivy and Stone Flowers, with Martyr Music Group. This new offering had received rave reviews and much media attention and even received high praise in print from their peers in My Dying Bride and Moonspell.

In May 2000, Novembers Doom entered the recording studio once again, to record the follow-up to Of Sculptured Ivy and Stone Flowers. The band has recorded The Knowing with Studio One's Chris Wisco. The CD is an extension of the previous material, only taking steps in new directions.

In July 2000, Novembers Doom officially became a member of Dark Symphonies. Realizing the band's potential, they constructed a deal with Martyr Music Group, to include the band on its roster, releasing The Knowing to the public.

With their third full-length release receiving praise, and a European licensed release of the CD through Pavement Music, Novembers Doom secured themselves more attention than before.

=== To Welcome the Fade ===
In October 2002, Novembers Doom entered the studio to begin work on their second full-length of new material for Dark Symphonies. The band's fourth full-length album would be entitled To Welcome the Fade, only this time they recruited the talents of the Grammy Award-winning producer, Neil Kernon. Kernon, best known for his work with acts like Hall & Oates, Kansas, Yes, Queensrÿche, Judas Priest, and more recently Nevermore and Cannibal Corpse, brought a new power and clarity to the sound of the band. This album was chosen as the Number One metal album of 2002 in Metal Maniacs magazine by one of its head editors, Novembers Doom was also a featured cover story on their January 2003 issue.

=== Signing with The End ===
In 2004, a successful tour in North America with The Gathering eventually led to a signing with The End Records that summer. During that tour, a CD sampler was given away at each show, entitled Reflecting in Grey Dusk, which featured songs from each previous release, as well as an early demo version of the song, "In the Absence of Grace". This song was listed on the cover as being included on the upcoming album, "Ascension". However, by the time the new album was recorded, the title of the album was changed to The Pale Haunt Departure. The album was recorded in the Fall of 2004, and this time around the band enlisted the help of the very respected producer and artist Dan Swanö (Edge of Sanity, Bloodbath and Nightingale) for the mixing duties, and the mastering went to metal guitarist and producer James Murphy (Testament, Obituary and Disincarnate). The engineering duties were handled by Chris Wisco at Studio One in Racine, Wisconsin.

In March 2005, The Pale Haunt Departure was released with a tour supporting it. Novembers Doom continued to forge ahead, meshing diverse musical styles and textures in the pursuit of always creating a new and unique listening experience with each new release, while retaining their heavy sound and dark lyrics. With the incorporation of new guitarist/songwriter Vito Marchese, a more straightforward "death metal" approach was incorporated into the songwriting, while still retaining some of their previous dark doom/death sound on certain songs.

In November 2006, Novembers Doom performed their first full-length overseas tour in Western Europe, touring with the bands Agalloch, Saturnus, and Thurisaz in support. Shortly thereafter, in early 2007, they released their next CD, The Novella Reservoir, which continued further down the musical path the band had embarked upon with the previous CD. This new CD garnered many favorable reviews and attention for the band. They returned to Europe later that year to record their upcoming DVD release, The Novella Vosselaar: Live In Belgium, at the Biebob Club in Vosselaar, Belgium. The DVD was released on August 5, 2008.

2008 also saw the re-release of the band's first two CDs, Amid Its Hallowed Mirth and Of Sculptured Ivy and Stone Flowers, on their current label The End Records. Both CDs featured new artwork, bonus tracks and remastered sound. The End Records also re-released their third CD, The Knowing, on November 22, 2010, in honor of the album's 10-year anniversary. This release featured a newly remixed, remastered alternate version of the album on one disc, and a second disc that features the original, untouched version from 2000.

In June–July 2008, the band returned to Europe for their third road trek, most notably performing at the Graspop Metal Meeting festival on June 28, 2008, in Belgium.

In 2009, the band released their seventh full-length CD Into Night's Requiem Infernal, and toured behind it in late 2009 and early 2010, making appearances at several festivals such as Brutal Assault Festival in Czech Republic, and Caos Emergente in Portugal. A music video for the song, "A Eulogy For The Living Lost" was also filmed in late 2009, and was released in early 2010.

Their eighth album, Aphotic, was released in early 2011. Their ninth album, Bled White, was released in 2014. They released their tenth album, Hamartia, in April 2017.

=== Signing with Prophecy Productions and more albums ===
On November 1, 2018, the band announced on Facebook they had signed to Prophecy Productions. They released their eleventh album, Nephilim Grove, one year later on November 1, 2019. The record was well-received by fans and the few critics who reviewed it, with Mystificationzine's review giving it a 4/5 rating and praising its fresh, catchy, and relentless progressive death metal sound that is unlike the band's previous death-doom sensibilities. The reviewer says "it brings a certain higher standard of songwriting to what I’d consider a popular/accessible style of extreme metal" and giving the recommendation of "For preview purposes I’d suggest starting with The Witness Marks for a measure of progressive death metal and driving vocal hooks [...]."

Kerrang! called it "a departure from 2017's Hamartia, which vocalist Paul Kuhr described as 'new colors, new sounds, the same bad-assery' — this time around, the latter is the most important aspect, with each song wearing its brutality on its sleeve and couching its depressive and emotional side from a place of rage."

Nephilim Grove was the band's last release for six years, marking their longest gap between releases since the four-year wait for Of Sculptured Ivy and Stone Flowers. Following multiple teases and discussions of progress on Paul Kuhr's personal Facebook page, the band's twelfth studio album Major Arcana was announced, coupled with the release of the lead single and title track off the album. The album proper came out September 19, 2025, with two other singles ("Mercy" and "Ravenous") released beforehand. On September 26, Novembers Doom played an album release show at Reggies in Chicago. The concert was livestreamed on the website reggieslive.com.

The release of Major Arcana coincided with the twentieth anniversary of the band's seminal work The Pale Haunt Departure which was reissued on vinyl to celebrate the milestone. The band went live on Facebook to discuss the 2005 album's history and were scheduled to play two shows in New York in October to mark both the anniversary of The Pale Haunt Departure and the release of Major Arcana. These shows, however, were postponed indefinitely due to undisclosed "circumstances beyond anyone's control." As of January 2026, these shows have yet to be rescheduled, and no news regarding them have been shared. The band did, however, perform a joint Major Arcana and The Pale Haunt Departure celebration show in November of 2025 at the LiveWire Lounge venue in Chicago.

Major Arcana's album artwork was done by the artist STRX. The record was released for purchase alongside a complete set of tarot cards with designs by the same artist. The album is among the band's best-received work in almost 20 years, with Blabbermouth giving the rating of 8/10, calling the tracks on the record "powerful and direct, their in-built atmospherics designed to maximize impact, rather than to shroud everything in a layer of hazy mystique." A review on Teethofthedivine.com, an extreme music review site, said of the album "Overall, I can’t see any unhappiness with any of the current fanbase, and perhaps Major Arcana will garner new ones." and praised the album, only citing its length and slightly repetitive structure as minor drawbacks.

On December 19, 2025, Novembers Doom were announced for the Brutal Assault festival in Czechia for the summer of 2026 and on January 19, 2026, they were added to the roster of Fekete Zaj Fesztivál in Hungary, also for the summer of 2026.

== Members ==
=== Current members ===
- Paul Kuhr – vocals (1992–present)
- Lawrence Roberts – guitars (1999–present)
- Vito Marchese – guitars (2003–present)
- George Lohan – bass (2026)
- Garry Naples – drums (2011–present)

=== Former members ===
- Cathy Jo Hejna – vocals (1992–1999, died 2024)
- Steve Nicholson – guitars (1992–1997), bass (1992–1995)
- Jason Armalius – guitars (1995–1997)
- Eric Burnley – guitars (1997–2003)
- Brian Whited – bass (1995–1997; touring 2005)
- Mary Bielich – bass (1997–2001)
- Mike LeGros – bass (2002–2005)
- Chris Wisco – bass (2006–2009)
- Joe Hernandez – drums (1992–1995)
- Emmet Hall – drums (1995–1997)
- Abbas Jaffary – drums (1997–1998)
- Sasha Horn – drums (1998–1999, 2008–2011)
- Joe Nuñez – drums (1999–2008)

== Discography ==
=== Studio albums ===
- Amid Its Hallowed Mirth (1995)
- Of Sculptured Ivy and Stone Flowers (1999)
- The Knowing (2000)
- To Welcome the Fade (2002)
- The Pale Haunt Departure (2005)
- The Novella Reservoir (2007)
- Into Night's Requiem Infernal (2009)
- Aphotic (2011)
- Bled White (2014)
- Hamartia (2017)
- Nephilim Grove (2019)
- Major Arcana (2025)

=== Other releases ===
- Her Tears Drop (demo, 1995)
- For Every Leaf That Falls (EP, 1997)
- Reflecting in Grey Dusk (compilation/promotion, 2004)
- The Novella Vosselaar - Live in Belgium (DVD, 2008)

=== Music videos ===
- "The Pale Haunt Departure" (2005)
- "Autumn Reflection" (2006)
- "Rain" (2008)
- "A Eulogy for the Living Lost" (2010)
- "What Could Have Been" (2011)
- "Harvest Scythe" (2011)
- "Bled White" (2015)
- "Zephyr" (2017)
- "What We Become" (2019)
- "Major Arcana" (2025)
- "Mercy" (2025)
- "Ravenous" (2025)
