= Quietus (album) =

Studio album by Evoken
- Released: February 24, 2001
- Recorded: WAVE Studios – October–November 2000
- Genre: Funeral doom
- Length: 63:10
- Label: Avantgarde Music
- Producer: Evoken and Ron Thal

Evoken chronology
Embrace the Emptiness (1998)	Quietus (2001)	Antithesis of Light (2005)

Professional ratings
Review scores
Source	Rating
Allmusic	3.5/5 stars

Quietus is the second album by the American doom metal band Evoken. It was released in 2001.

== Track listing ==
No.	Title	Length
1.	"In Pestilence, Burning"	8:42
2.	"Withering Indignition"	8:55
3.	"Tending the Dire Hatred"	7:11
4.	"Where Ghosts Fall Silent"	10:42
5.	"Quietus"	10:48
6.	"Embrace the Emptiness"	12:55
7.	"Atrementous Journey"	4:14
Total length:		63:10

== Personnel ==
- John Paradiso – Guitars/Vocals
- Nick Orlando – Guitars
- Steve Moran – Bass
- Vince Verkay – Drums
- Dario Derna – Keyboards
- Suzanne Bass – Session Cello
