= Fredrik Johansson (bandy) =

Swedish bandy player (born 1984)

Fredrik Johansson (born 9 September 1984) is a Swedish bandy player who currently plays for Vetlanda BK as a midfielder.

Fredrik has only played for two clubs:

- Vetlanda BK (2001–)
- Öjaby IS (2002–2003)
