= Draconian (band) =

Swedish gothic metal band

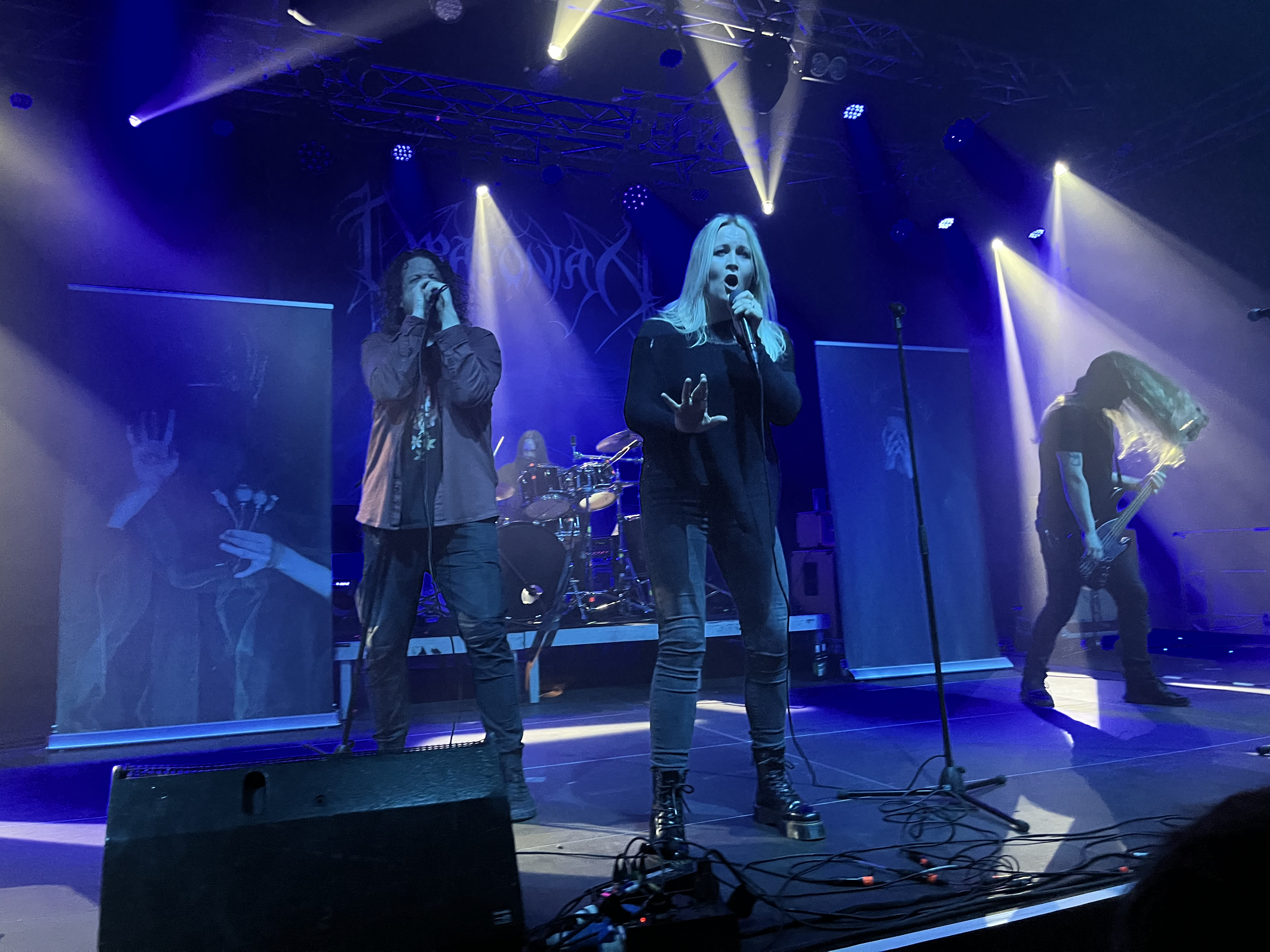
- Draconian performing in Germany, 2023

Background information
- Also known as: Kerberos (1994)
- Origin: Säffle, Sweden
- Genres: Gothic metal; death-doom
- Years active: 1994–present
- Label: Napalm
- Members: Anders Jacobsson; Johan Ericson; Lisa Johansson; Daniel Arvidsson; Niklas Nord; Daniel Johansson
- Past members: Susanne Arvidsson; Andreas Hindenäs; Thomas Jäger; Magnus Bergström; Jesper Stolpe; Andreas Karlsson; Fredrik Johansson; Daniel Änghede; Heike Langhans; Jerry Torstensson
- Website: draconianofficial.com
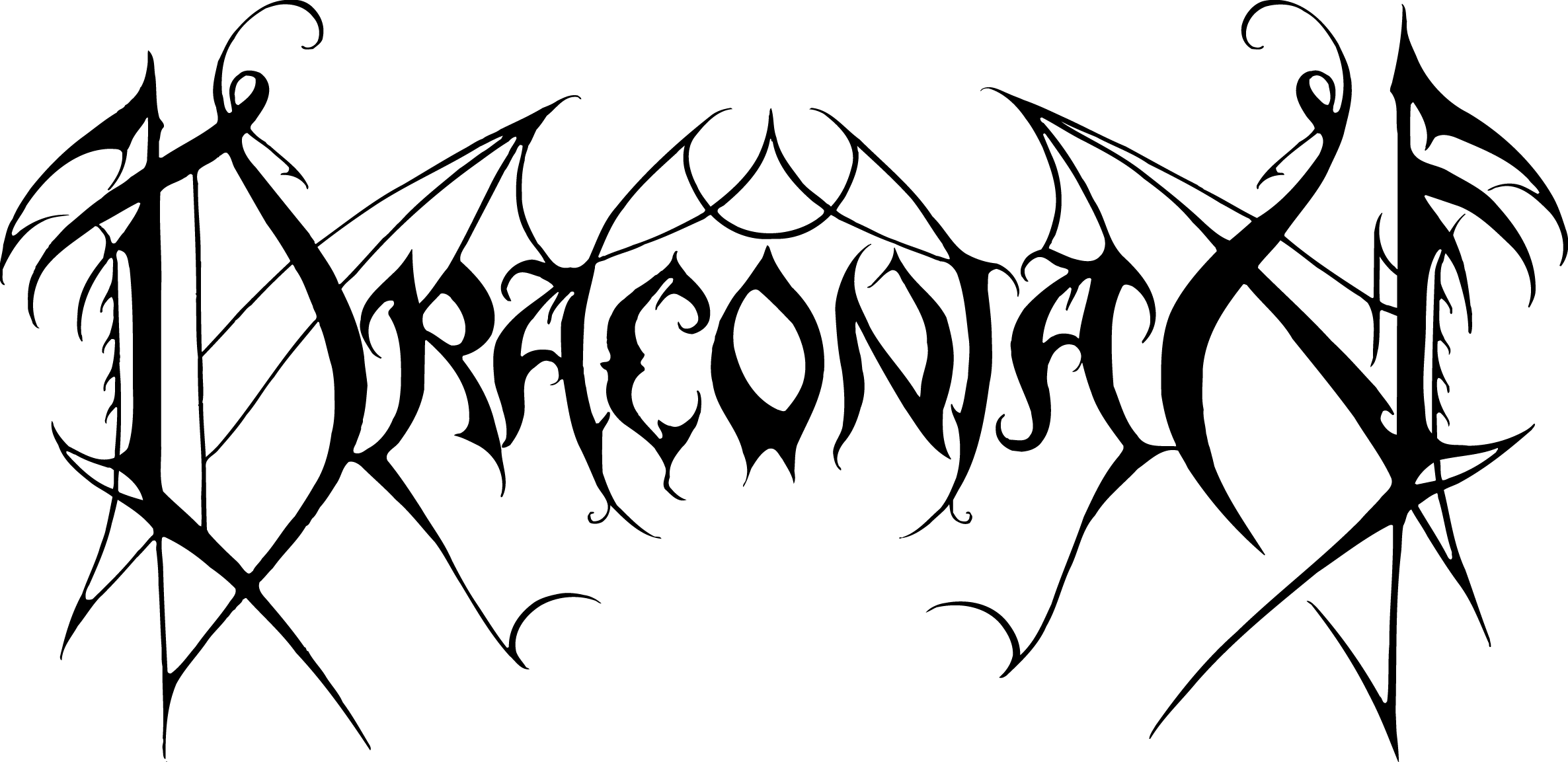

Draconian is a Swedish gothic metal band formed in Säffle in 1994. The band's lineup had changed over the years, with only founding members Anders Jacobsson and Johan Ericson still active members. Since the release of their first album Where Lovers Mourn in 2003; the lineup has been mostly stable, with Jerry Torstensson on drums, and Lisa Johansson and Heike Langhans alternately singing clean vocal parts. The band has released eight studio albums along with various singles and music videos.

== History ==
=== Formation and demos (1994–2002) ===
Draconian was formed in 1994 in Säffle, Sweden. In May 1994, drummer and vocalist Johan Ericson, bassist and vocalist Jesper Stolpe and guitarist Andreas Hindenäs assembled the band Kerberos, initially playing melodic death metal with black metal influences. Seven months later, lead vocalist and lyrics composer Anders Jacobsson joined the band, and its name changed to Draconian.

Their first demo, Shades of a Lost Moon, was recorded in 1995. Guests were flutist and vocalist Jessica Eriksson, keyboardist and vocalist Susanne Arvidsson, and Andreas Haag on the introductory section of "My Nemesis". It was released in February 1996, however, no recording contract was obtained. In early 1997, the band proceeded to record their second demo, entitled In Glorious Victory. The band, however, became discontent with the quality of the recording and scrapped the release.

Both in 1998 and 1999, the band did some gigs. After receiving positive reactions, they decided to enter the studio once more. In August 1999, Draconian recorded The Closed Eyes of Paradise, released later that year, an album dealing mostly with the theme of Lucifer and his fallen angels. Susanne Arvidsson made guest vocal appearances on this release. Between May and June 2000, Andreas Karlsson, Anders Jacobsson, and Johan Ericson worked on their next demo, the two-track EP Frozen Features, which was released in the face of further line-up changes – Andreas Hindenäs left the band, replaced by Johan Ericson who switched to guitars; drums were then left to Jerry Torstensson. In the following months, two members of Draconian had to complete their military service, slowing down the progress of the band. Susanne Arvidsson was replaced in 2001 by Lisa Johansson.

The demo Dark Oceans We Cry was recorded in 2002, the first release to feature Lisa Johansson's vocals. The demo was made available on the internet, as well as in CD format. It received good reviews and the band signed a long-awaited record deal with Napalm Records.

=== Where Lovers Mourn and Arcane Rain Fell (2003–2005) ===
The band recorded their debut album, Where Lovers Mourn in Studio Mega under the supervision of Chris Silver (former member of Sundown and Cemetery) in July 2003. The album was released 20 October 2003.

In September 2004, under the direction of Pelle Saether, Draconian entered Studio Underground in Västerås to record their second studio album, Arcane Rain Fell. The album was released 24 January 2005.

=== The Burning Halo and Turning Season Within (2006–2008) ===
In 2006 they began working on their third release. However, due to myriad fan requests, the band decided to first deliver a bonus album to include remakes of old tracks from The Closed Eyes of Paradise demo. The Burning Halo would also include three new tracks and two covers. Plagued by numerous problems throughout the production phases, the album was delayed and finally completed in June and released 29 September 2006.

In September 2007, Draconian started to record their fourth album, Turning Season Within, at the Fascination Street Studios in Örebro with producers Jens Bogren and David Castillo (Opeth, Katatonia). The album was released 29 February 2008.

=== A Rose for the Apocalypse (2011–2012) ===
On 24 June 2011, Draconian released their fifth album A Rose for the Apocalypse. On 25 June, the band released an official music video from the album A Rose for the Apocalypse for the song "The Last Hour of Ancient Sunlight."

On 15 November, vocalist Lisa Johansson left the band for personal reasons, taking care of her newborn son and of her job as florist. On 19 September 2012, the band officially announced their new vocalist, Heike Langhans, from South Africa.

=== Sovran and Under a Godless Veil (2015–2020) ===
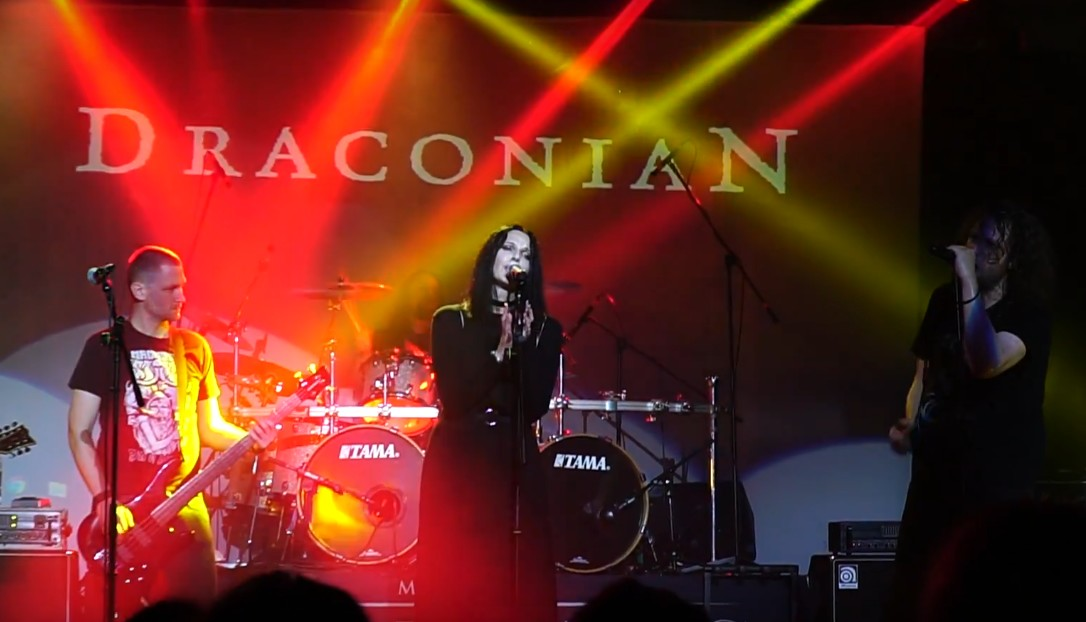
Draconian at Metal Gates 2018

On 30 October 2015, Sovran, the band's sixth studio album, was released via Napalm Records. It was mixed and mastered by Jens Bogren, with whom they had previously worked, at Fascination Street Studios. Sovran is the first album of Draconian with Heike Langhans, who also co-wrote some of the lyrics.

On 10 February 2016, the band announced on its Facebook page that bassist Fredrik Johansson was leaving the band to spend more time with his family and due to his inability to tour with the band. Daniel Änghede, who provided clean vocals on the song "Rivers Between Us" on Sovran, became his replacement for live concerts.

On 30 October 2020, Draconian released their seventh studio album, Under a Godless Veil, on which Änghede participated as session bassist.

=== Lineup changes and In Somnolent Ruin (2022–present) ===
On 26 April 2022, Draconian announced that Niklas Nord had joined the band on rhythm guitar, and that longtime rhythm guitarist Daniel Arvidsson would switch to bass.

On 3 May, Draconian announced that vocalist Heike Langhans would leave the band to focus on her own projects, and that former vocalist Lisa Johansson would rejoin the band. They played a special farewell set with both singers at Hellfest 2022.

In 2024, the band celebrated its 30th anniversary with a 17-date European tour.

On 2 October 2025, the band announced on Facebook that they had finished drum tracking for the followup to Under a Godless Veil. In the same post, they revealed that Daniel Johansson, who had been touring as a drummer with Draconian since 2019, had been officially indicted into the band, replacing longtime drummer Jerry Torstensson.

On 11 February 2026, the band announced their eighth studio album, In Somnolent Ruin, would be released on 8 May.

== Band members ==
Current

- Anders Jacobsson – unclean vocals (1994–present); keyboards, programming (1994–1999)
- Johan Ericson – lead guitar (2002–present); backing vocals (1997–present); drums (1994–2002)
- Lisa Johansson – clean vocals (2002–2011, 2022–present)
- Daniel Arvidsson – bass (2022–present); rhythm guitar (2005–2022)
- Niklas Nord – rhythm guitar (2022–present)
- Daniel Johansson – drums (2025–present)

Former

- Susanne Arvidsson – clean vocals, keyboards, programming (1995–1997)
- Andreas Hindenäs – lead guitar (1994–2002)
- Thomas Jäger – bass (2002–2004)
- Magnus Bergström – rhythm guitar (1996–2005)
- Jesper Stolpe – bass (1994–2002, 2004–2005)
- Andreas Karlsson – keyboards, programming (1997–2005)
- Fredrik Johansson – bass (2005–2016)
- Daniel Änghede – bass (2016–2020)
- Heike Langhans – clean vocals (2012–2022)
- Jerry Torstensson – drums (2002–2025)

Session

- Jessica Eriksson – clean vocals (1995)
- Sanne Carlsson – keyboards, programming (2005–2006)
- Elena Andersson – keyboards, programming (2006–2007)
- Tarald Lie – drums (2016)
- Lisa Cuthbert – clean vocals (2015, 2016, 2017)
- Daniel Johansson – drums (2019–2025)
- Fredrik Kelemen – rhythm guitar (2025)

Timeline

== Discography ==
=== Studio albums ===
- Where Lovers Mourn (2003)
- Arcane Rain Fell (2005)
- The Burning Halo (2006)
- Turning Season Within (2008)
- A Rose for the Apocalypse (2011)
- Sovran (2015)
- Under a Godless Veil (2020)
- In Somnolent Ruin (2026)

=== Demos ===
- Shades of a Lost Moon (1996)
- In Glorious Victory (1997, shelved)
- The Closed Eyes of Paradise (1999)
- Frozen Features (2000)
- Dark Oceans We Cry (2002)

=== Singles ===
- "No Greater Sorrow" (2008)
- "The Last Hour of Ancient Sunlight" (2011)
- "Demon You / Lily Anne" (Twenty Years in Tears – A Tribute to Lake of Tears, 2012)
- "Stellar Tombs" (2015)
- "Rivers Between Us" (featuring Daniel Änghede, 2015)
- "Lustrous Heart" (2020)
- "Sorrow of Sophia" (2020)
- "Cold Heavens" (2026)
- "Misanthrope River" (2026)

=== Music videos ===
- "The Last Hour of Ancient Sunlight" (2011)
- "Stellar Tombs" (2016)
- "Sleepwalkers" (2020)
- "Lustrous Heart" (2020)
- "Moon Over Sabaoth" (2020)
- "The Sethian" (2021)
- "Cold Heavens" (2026)
- "Misanthrope River" (2026)
