= Säffle =

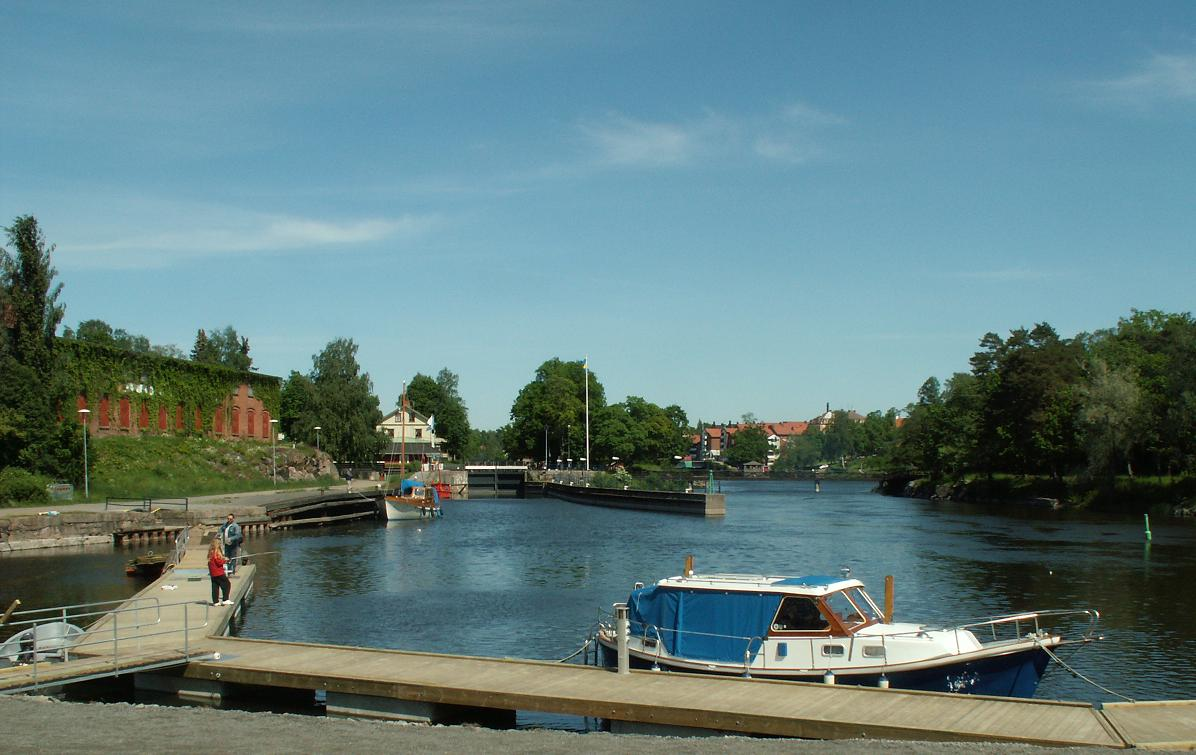
- View from south over the floodgate

- Location within Sweden
- Coordinates: 59°08′N 12°56′E
- Country: Sweden
- Province: Värmland
- County: Värmland County
- Municipality: Säffle Municipality

Area
  - Total: 7.35 km^{2} (2.84 sq mi)

Population (31 December 2010)
  - Total: 8,991
  - Density: 1,223/km^{2} (3,170/sq mi)
- Time zone: UTC+1 (CET)
  - Summer (DST): UTC+2 (CEST)

Säffle (Swedish pronunciation: [ˈsɛ̂fːlɛ]) is a locality and the seat of Säffle Municipality, Värmland County, Sweden with 9,150 inhabitants in 2016.

In 1951 the town of Säffle was officially awarded City status, the last place for this to occur in Sweden. This was abolished in 1971 and Säffle is now the seat of the much larger Säffle Municipality.

== History ==
Säffle's main growth as a town took place after the building of a canal in 1837 which allowed boats to safely bypass a section of turbulent water and rapids in the Byälven river.

In 1879 the railway came, linking Säffle with both the west and east coasts, the capital Stockholm and the busy port of Gothenburg. This enabled Säffle to transport her wood products and the village soon became a thriving town.

In 1882 Säffle had a population of 700 inhabitants. Today, Säffle municipality has 16,077 inhabitants (1 January 2005).

According to legend, the Viking Olof Trätälja settled and lived in Säffle. Streets, churches, and a lot of other places are named after him.

== Cultural references ==
Most parts of the Kanal 5 reality series Lite sällskap, hosted by Swedish comedians Filip Hammar and Fredrik Wikingsson were recorded in Säffle.

== Tourism ==
=== Sports associations ===
- Säffle Hockey Club - Ice hockey
- SK Sifhälla - football
- Säffle FF - football

=== Art & museum ===
- Viking Trail Society
- The Viking center of Värmland - The Viking museum outside Säffle

== Trade & industry ==
The economy of Säffle is largely based on industry. Säffle has continued to grow as the pulpwood industry has expanded in Sweden. The pulp mill in Säffle has been a major driving force in the local economy.

In the early 19th Century there was also a brickworks in Säffle, which supplied the town with facing bricks. This you can see on all of the buildings from this period in central Säffle.

The biggest companies in Säffle today are:
SOMAS
Nordic Paper Seffle AB
Säffle Karosseri / Volvo Buses
BTG
CCI
MOELVEN

== Famous people from Säffle ==
- Gunnar Andersson, football player
- Daniel Carlsson, rally driver
- Anders Jacobsson, member of the gothic/doom metal band Draconian
- Johan Ericson, multinstrumental musician member of Draconian, Doom:VS and Shadowgarden
- Annichen Kringstad, orienteer
- Daniel Arvidsson, musician, member of Draconian
- Esaias Tegnér, writer and bishop
- Tina Thörner, rally co-driver
- Lars-Erik Torph, rally driver
