= Evoken =

American funeral doom metal band

- Also known as: Funereus (1992); Asmodeus (1993)
- Origin: Lyndhurst, New Jersey, U.S.
- Genre: Funeral doom
- Years active: 1992–present
- Labels: Elegy, Avantgarde, I Hate, Profound Lore
- Members: John Paradiso; Chris Molinari; Dave Wagner; Don Zaros; Vince Verkay
- Past members: Nick Orlando; Phil Wilson; Rob Robichaud; Bill Manley; Steve Moran; Dario Derna; Denny Hahn
- Website: evokendoom.net

Evoken is an American funeral doom band from Lyndhurst, New Jersey. They are one of the earliest U.S. death-doom bands still active today, along with Novembers Doom and Rigor Sardonicous.

== History ==
=== Founding years ===
Guitarist Nick Orlando founded the band as Funereus in April 1992. The original line-up consisted of Rob (bass/vocals), Nick (guitar), Phil (guitar) and Vince (drums). They recorded a rehearsal demo in 1992, the only release under the Funereus name. After changing their name to Asmodeus the following year, the band decided on Evoken in 1994 after several line-up changes. The name was taken from a Thergothon song from the Fhtagn nagh Yog-Sothoth demo.

=== Reaching mainstream ===
In 2003, Evoken headlined the Dutch Doomsday Festival during a brief European tour of the Netherlands, Belgium and the UK.

Evoken left Avantgarde Music of Italy after releasing two albums with the label and signed to Sweden's I Hate Records in January 2007.

Evoken returned to tour Europe in 2009, and again in 2011 for Roadburn Festival in the Netherlands. The following year, they signed to Canada's Profound Lore Records and performed on the inaugural Decibel Magazine tour in Baltimore, Philadelphia, and New York City. Their fifth full-length album, Atra Mors, which was Profound Lore's 100th release, came out in 2012.

== Stylistic influences ==
Evoken credits its main influences to be Australian band Disembowelment, England's Paradise Lost, the American band Winter, and the Finnish band Thergothon.

== Members ==
Current

- Vince Verkay – drums (1992–present)
- John Paradiso – guitar, vocals (1994–present), keyboards (1994, 2007), bass (2004–2007)
- Don Zaros – keyboards (2007–present)
- Dave Wagner – bass (2008–present)
- Chris Molinari – guitar (2009–present)
- Randy Cavanaugh – guitar (2018–present)

Former

- Nick Orlando – guitar (1992–2008), keyboards (2007)
- Phil Wilson – guitar (1992)
- Rob Robichaud – bass, vocals (1992–1993)
- Bill Manley – bass (1994–1996)
- Dario Derna – keyboards (1995–2002)
- Steve Moran – bass (1996–2004)
- Denny Hahn – keyboards (2003–2007)
- Craig Pillard – Bass, Keyboards (2007)

Session

- Charles Lamb – cello (1998)
- Suzanne Bass – cello (1999)
- Chris Kuffner – cello (2005)
- Craig Pillard – bass (2007)
- Brian Sanders – cello (2012)

== Discography ==
=== Studio albums ===
- Embrace the Emptiness (1998)
- Quietus (2001)
- Antithesis of Light (2005)
- A Caress of the Void (2007)
- Atra Mors (2012)
- Hypnagogia (2018)
- Mendacium (2025)

=== Demos ===
- Demo 1992 (1992, as Funereus)
- Into the Autumn Shade (1992, as Funereus)
- Shades of Night Descending (1994)
- Promo '96 (1996)
- Promo 1997 (1997)
- Promo 2002 (2002)

=== Split album ===
- Evoken / Beneath The Frozen Soil (2010)

=== Compilation album ===
- A Caress of the Void / Omniscient (2018)

=== Single ===
- Rotting Misery (2012)
