= Paul Kuhr =

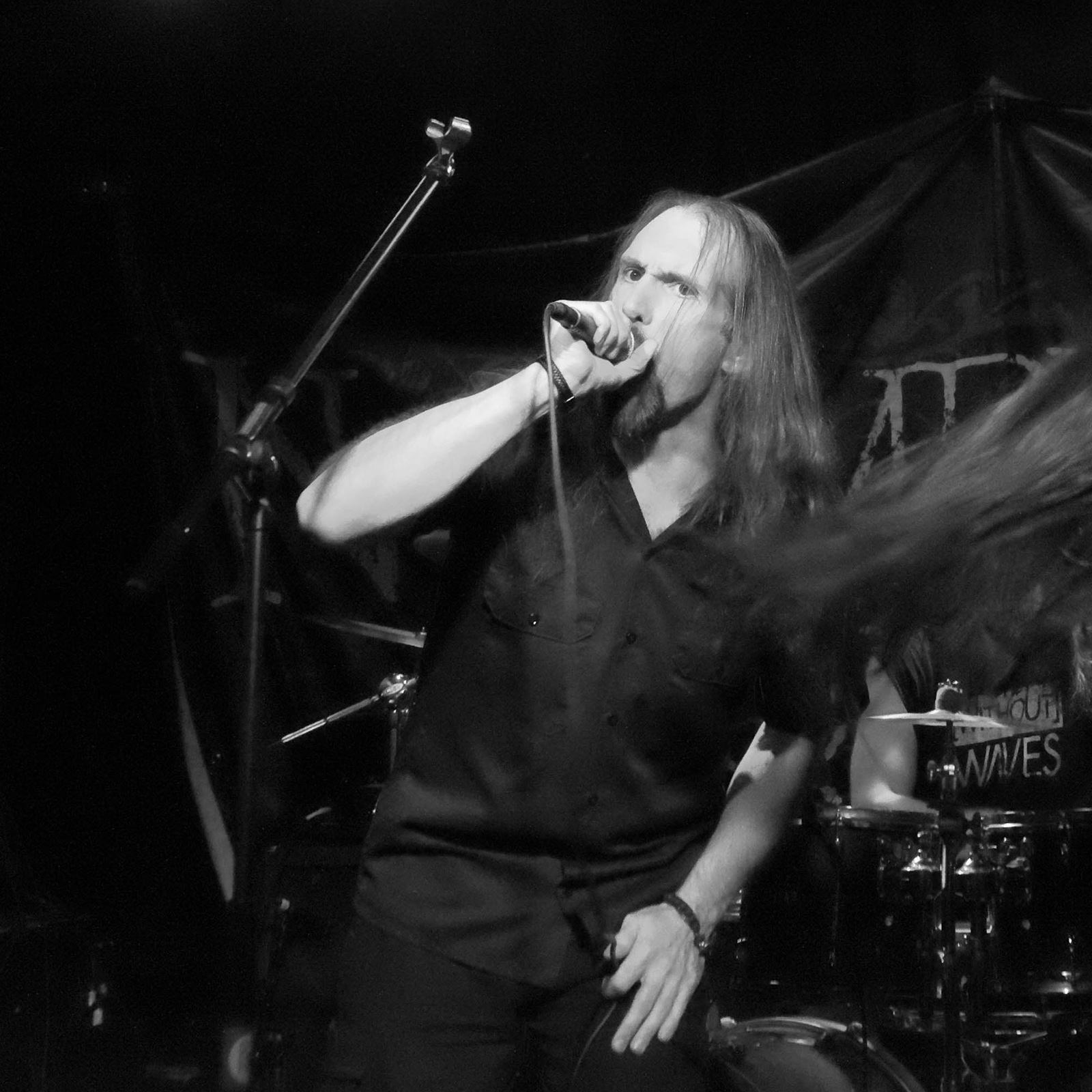

Background information
- Birth name: Paul August Kuhr, III
- Born: 4 December 1971 (age 53); Berwyn, Illinois, USA
- Genres: Doom metal, gothic metal, death-doom
- Occupation(s): Musician, singer, lyricist, author, graphic designer
- Instrument: Vocals
- Years active: 1986–present
- Labels: Prophecy Productions

Paul August Kuhr, III (born December 4, 1971, in Berwyn, Illinois, USA), is an American musician, vocalist, lyricist, author, and graphic designer. He is the singer and founding member for the band Novembers Doom.

== Music ==
Starting the band in 1989, his vocal style for Novembers Doom consists both of clean vocals and death growls.

Other projects Kuhr has been involved in vary from thrash metal in the 1980s in the form of Laceration (with fellow founding Novembers Doom member Steve Nicholson), to the late symphonic doom band Em Sinfonia. He was also in the band Subterranean Masquerade, where he used his growl, as well as his singing voice. Kuhr has also recorded his narrative vocals on the Draconian CD, Turning Season Within, and provided backing vocals on the track "Praise the Lowered" on the album Deconstruction by Devin Townsend Project. Most recently, he has provided all lyrics for Dan Swanö's Witherscape project.

Kuhr is also a founding member of the Chicago-based band Death Metal band, These Are They (with fellow founding Novembers Doom member Steve Nicholson.)

== Graphic design ==
Kuhr has worked as a freelance designer, creating CD covers, promotional posters, CD and DVD packaging, and website design. He currently maintains the website for his own band, Novembers Doom. He has worked on CD and/or vinyl artwork/layout for bands such as Novembers Doom, Macabre, Antimatter, Skepticism, Bethlehem, Katatonia, Enter Self, Em Sinfonia, Gorgasm, Council of the Fallen, Necrophagia, Broken Hope, Michael Angelo Batio, Jungle Rot, Disinter and Shroud of Bereavement.

== Personal life ==
Kuhr is married to Noël Schroeder, on December 9, 2022. Kuhr was previously married from 1996 to 2013. He has a daughter who has been the topic of three Novembers Doom songs, "Autumn Reflection" and "Swallowed by the Moon" on The Pale Haunt Departure, and "Twilight Innocence" on The Novella Reservoir and she recorded guest vocals for 3 tracks on the album Hamartia, titled "Ever After", "Miasma", and "Zephyr." After almost 20 years of marriage, Kuhr officially filed for divorce on Sept. 9th 2013, which was then finalized on November 1, 2013.

Kuhr has been diagnosed with spinal stenosis since 2008. In 2006, Kuhr released a lyrical explanation book titled The Wayfaring Chronicles. Within the pages of this book, Kuhr explains the root of his personal style of lyrical writing. A lot of it comes from multiple issues described as diseases in his spine: spinal stenosis and ankylosing spondylitis.

== Discography ==
Novembers Doom

- Amid its Hallowed Mirth (1995)
- For Every Leaf That Falls - EP (1997)
- Of Sculptured Ivy and Stone Flowers (1999)
- The Knowing (2000)
- To Welcome the Fade (2002)
- The Pale Haunt Departure (2005)
- The Novella Reservoir (2007)
- Into Night's Requiem Infernal (2009)
- Aphotic (2011)
- Bled White (2014)
- Hamartia (2017)
- Nephilim Grove (2019)

These Are They

- Who Manifest (2009)
- Who Linger (2009)
- Disposing of Betrayers (2010)
- At the Feast of Seven Funerals (2014)
- 1871 (2014)

Subterranean Masquerade

- Temporary Psychotic State (2004)
- Various - Tribute To Dead Can Dance: The Lotus Eaters (2004)
- Suspended Animation Dreams (2005)
- Home (2013)
- The Great Bazaar (2015)

Em Sinfonia

- In Mournings Symphony (1999)

Guest Appearances (Vocals)

- Andy Winter - Incomprehensible - The Transversal Conjecture
- Broken Anatomy - The Lazarus Regret
- Devin Townsend Project - Deconstruction - Praise The Lowered
- Draconian - Turning Season Within - When I Wake, Earthbound, The Failure Epiphany, Morphine Cloud, September Ashes
- Earthen - Indian Summer
- Fading Bliss - From Illusion To Despair - Walk Through Despair
- Falling Leaves - Mournful Cry Of A Dying Sun - Vanished Serenity
- On Thorns I Lay - Aegean Sorrow - The Final Truth
- Thurisaz - The Cimmerian Years - No Regrets
- Witherscape - The Inheritance - Dying For the Sun
- Within the Fall - Where Sorrow Grows - A Dream Yet to Come
- Heart of Gold: A Tribute to Woods of Ypres - Wet Leather (as Novembers Doom) - Finality (as Kuhrzarth)
