= Death-doom =

Extreme subgenre of heavy metal

- Other names: Death-doom metal; doom-death
- Stylistic origins: Death metal; doom metal
- Cultural origins: Late 1980s
- Derivative forms: Gothic metal

Fusion genres
- Funeral doom

Death-doom (also known as death-doom metal or doom-death) is a fusion genre of death metal and doom metal. It combines the slow tempos and pessimistic or depressive mood of doom metal with the deep growling vocals and double-kick drumming of death metal. The genre emerged in the late 1980s and gained a certain amount of popularity during the 1990s, but had become less common by the turn of the 21st century. In turn, death-doom gave rise to the closely related genre of funeral doom as well as to the more melodic, gloomy and romantic gothic metal.

== History ==
The first signs of the death/doom genre originated in the mid-1980s when early progenitors like Dream Death began to mix traditional doom metal with the sounds of the nascent death metal scene. Early records in the 1990s by such bands as Autopsy, Winter, Paradise Lost, My Dying Bride and Anathema combined the doom sound of mid-1980s Celtic Frost and Candlemass with growling vocals, female vocals, keyboards and, in the case of My Dying Bride, violins. The influence of these bands has been acknowledged by the likes of gothic metal bands Within Temptation, Lacuna Coil, The Gathering, Celestial Season and Saturnus. The tag of death/doom seemed to become less popular towards the end of the decade as many of the scene progenitors abandoned their early sound to embrace a more accessible or palatable direction.

However, the style persists in the form of funeral doom, a genre that crosses death-doom with funeral dirge music. It is played at a very slow tempo, and places an emphasis on evoking a sense of emptiness and despair. Typically, electric guitars are heavily distorted and dark ambient aspects such as keyboards or synthesizers are often used to create a "dreamlike" atmosphere. Vocals consist of mournful chants or growls and are often in the background. Funeral doom was pioneered by Mournful Congregation (Australia), Esoteric (United Kingdom), Evoken (United States), Funeral (Norway), Thergothon (Finland) and Skepticism (Finland).

== See also ==
- List of death-doom bands
