= List of original names of bands =

Many notable musical groups went by different names throughout their existence before becoming successful and famous. The following lists the official names which the bands formerly went by; some of them are or can be significantly different from the current ones. The list does not include bands with names that have minor differences such as style variations.

== List ==
This list is sortable, ordered alphabetically, starting with the name that the band is best known as, followed by the band's original name and any other names that they previously used in a chronological order.

Please order alphabetically with the last name. All entries must include citations to reliable sources to establish notability.

| Current name | Former name | Other former names | Country of origin | Year of foundation | References | Notes |
|---|---|---|---|---|---|---|
| 10 Years | Tater | | United States | 1999 | | |
| 10,000 Maniacs | Still Life | | United States | 1981 | | |
| 311 | Fish Hippos | The Eds | United States | 1988 | | |
| 40 Below Summer | 6 Degrees Of Degradation | Mid-Green Pimp Machine; Urethra Franklin | United States | 1998 | | |
| And Then She Came | Krypteria | | Germany | 2001 | | |
| Abaddon Incarnate | Bereaved | | Ireland | 1994 | | |
| Abhorrence | Rebirth | Unholy Fury | Finland | 1989 | | |
| Abramelin | Acheron | | Australia | 1988 | | |
| Absu | Dolmen | Azathoth | United States | 1989 | | |
| The Aces | The Four Aces | | Jamaica | 1965 | | Removed "Four" from the name. |
| The Aces | The Blue Aces | | United States | 2016 | | Removed "Blue" from the name. |
| AC/DC | Third World War | | Australia | 1973 | | |
| Acid | Precious Page | | Belgium | 1980 | | |
| Acroma | No Release | | United States | 1999 | | |
| Accept | Band X | | Germany | 1968 | | |
| Accessory | Voices Of Darkness | | Germany | 1994 | | |
| Advanced Art | Authorised Version | | Finland | 1985 | | |
| After Forever | Apocalypse | | Netherlands | 1995 | | |
| Age of Days | Age Of Daze | | Canada | 2005 | | Replaced "Daze" with "Days". |
| Age of Nemesis | Nemesis | | Hungary | 1997 | | |
| Agnostic Front | Zoo Crew | | United States | 1980 | | |
| The Agonist | Tempest | | Canada | 2004 | | |
| The Alarm | The Toilets | Seventeen | Wales | 1977 | | |
| Alastis | Fourth Reich | | Switzerland | 1987 | | |
| Alestorm | Battleheart | | Scotland | 2004 | | |
| Aletheian | Crutch | | United States | 1997 | | |
| Alice In Chains | Alice N' Chains | Diamond Lie | United States | 1986 | | |
| Altar | Manticore | Anubis | Netherlands | 1992 | | |
| Allister | Phineas Gage | Pheanus Peenus | United States | 1994 | | |
| Amayenge | Crossbones | The New Crossbones | Zambia | 1978 | | |
| Amaranthe | Avalanche | | Sweden | 2008 | | |
| Amber Pacific | Follow Through | | United States | 2002 | | |
| Amebix | The Band With No Name | | England | 1978 | | |
| American Head Charge | Flux | Gestapo Pussy Ranch; Warsaw Ghetto Pussy | United States | 1996 | | |
| American Hi-Fi | BMX Girl | | United States | 1998 | | |
| The Amenta | Crucible Of Agony | | Australia | 1997 | | |
| Amon Amarth | Scum | | Sweden | 1988 | | |
| Amorphis | Violent Solution | | Finland | 1990 | | |
| Anarbor | Troop 101 | | United States | 2003 | | |
| Anathema | Pagan Angel | | England | 1990 | | |
| The Angels | The Moonshine Jug And String Band | The Keystone Angels; Angel City; The Angels From Angel City | Australia | 1974 | | |
| Antestor | Crush Evil | | Norway | 1990 | | |
| Antischism | Initial State | | United States | 1993 | | |
| Anorexia Nervosa | Necromancia | | France | 1991 | | |
| Anubis Gate | Seven Powers | | Denmark | 2003 | | Members worked together since 1984 |
| Anvil | Lips | | Canada | 1978 | | |
| The Apples in Stereo | The Apples | | United States | 1991 | | Removed "In Stereo" from the name. |
| AqME | Neurosyndrom | | France | 1996 | | |
| Aqua | Joyspeed | | Denmark | 1989 | | |
| Architect | Found Dead Hanging | Ghost Of The Saltwater Machine | United States | 2000 | | |
| Archspire | Defenestrated | | Canada | 2007 | | |
| Arghoslent | Pogrom | | United States | 1990 | | |
| Арктида | Arkaim | | Russia | 2003 | | |
| Arcuri Overthrow | Black Rainbow | | Venezuela | 2002 | | |
| Arma Angelus | Novena | | United States | 1998 | | |
| Armchair | Shakers | | Thailand | 2001 | | |
| Armoured Angel | Metal Asylum | | Australia | 1982 | | |
| Arsonists | Bushwick Bomb Squad | | United States | 1993 | | |
| Arvas | Örth | | Norway | 1993 | | |
| As Fast As | Rocktopus | | United States | ? | | |
| As I Lay Dying | Against The Mark | Life Once Lost | United States | 2000 | | |
| Ashes You Leave | Icon | | Croatia | 1995 | | |
| Asin | Salt Of The Earth | | Philippines | 1976 | | |
| Asmodeus | Diabolus | | Austria | 1996 | | |
| Astarte | Lloth | | Greece | 1995 | | |
| Atheist | Oblivion | Raging Atheists Vowing A Gory End | United States | 1984 | | |
| Atomkraft | Moral Fibre | | England | 1978 | | |
| Atrocity | Instigators | | Germany | 1985 | | |
| Attacker | Warloc | | United States | 1983 | | |
| Audioslave | Civilian | | United States | 2001 | | |
| Audiovent | Papa's Dojo | Vent | United States | 1993 | | |
| Autopilot Off | Cooter | | United States | 1996 | | |
| Avatar | Lost Soul | | Sweden | 2001 | | |
| Axenstar | Powerage | | Sweden | 1998 | | |
| Axium | Red Eye | | United States | 1999 | | |
| The Beach Boys | ? | The Pendletones | United States | 1961 | | |
| Backstabbers Incorporated | Life Passed On | | United States | ? | | |
| Bad Brains | Mind Power | Soul Brains | United States | 1976 | | |
| Badfinger | The Iveys | | Wales | 1961 | | |
| The Band | The Hawks | | United States | 1958 | | |
| Band of Skulls | Fleeing New York | | England | 2002 | | |
| Barathrum | Darkfeast | | Finland | 1990 | | |
| Bay City Rollers | The Ambassadors | The Saxons; The Rollers; The New Rollers | Scotland | 1964 | | |
| The Bangles | The Colours | The Bangs | United States | 1981 | | |
| Bauhaus | S.R. | Bauhaus 1919 | England | 1978 | | |
| Beartooth | Noise | | United States | 2012 | | |
| Beastie Boys | The Young Aborigines | | United States | 1979 | | |
| The Beatles | The Blackjacks | The Quarrymen; Johnny & The Moon Dogs; The Silver Beetles | England | 1957 | | |
| Beat Union | Shortcut To Newark | | England | 2003 | | |
| Becoming the Archetype | Non-Existent Failure | The Remnant | United States | 1999 | | |
| Beherit | The Lord Diabolus | | Finland | 1989 | | |
| Behexen | Lord Of The Left Hand | | Finland | 1994 | | |
| Bee Gees | Wee Johnny Hayes And The Blue Cats | The Rattlesnakes | England | 1955 | | |
| Beyond Twilight | Twilight | | Denmark | 1992 | | Added "Beyond" to the name. |
| Believer | Deceiver | | United States | 1985 | | |
| Belphegor | Betrayer | | Austria | 1991 | | |
| Ben&Ben | The Benjamins | | Philippines | 2016 | | |
| Benedictum | Bound | | United States | 2005 | | |
| Beowülf | Black Sheep | | United States | 1981 | | |
| Better Luck Next Time | Snapout | | United States | 2003 | | |
| Biffy Clyro | Screwfish | | Scotland | 1995 | | |
| The Birthday Massacre | Imagica | | Canada | 1999 | | |
| Black Box | Starlight | Groove Groove Melody; Wood Allen | Italy | 1988 | | |
| The Black Crowes | Mr. Crowe's Garden | | United States | 1984 | | |
| Black Eyed Peas | Black Eyed Pods | | United States | 1995 | | Replaced "Pods" with "Peas". |
| Black Flag | Panic | | United States | 1976 | | |
| Blackguard | Profugus Mortis | | Canada | 2001 | | |
| Blackfoot | Fresh Garbage | Hammer | United States | 1969 | | |
| Black Majesty | Kymera | | Australia | 2001 | | |
| Black Moth Super Rainbow | Satanstompingcaterpillars | | United States | 2000 | | |
| Black 'n Blue | Movie Star | | United States | 1981 | | |
| Black Oak Arkansas | The Knowbody Else | | United States | 1963 | | |
| Black Tide | Radio | | United States | 2004 | | |
| Black Sabbath | The Polka Tulk Blues Band | Earth | England | 1968 | | |
| Black Uhuru | Uhuru | | Jamaica | 1972 | | |
| Black Witchery | Irreverent | Witchery | United States | 1991 | | |
| Bleeding Through | Breakneck | | United States | 1998 | | |
| The Bled | The Radiation Defiance Theory | | United States | 2001 | | |
| Bleeker | Bleeker Ridge | | Canada | 2003 | | Removed "Ridge" from the name. |
| Blink-182 | Duck Tape | Figure 8 Blink | United States | 1991 | | |
| The Blinded | Stigmata | Blinded Colony | Sweden | 2000 | | |
| Blind Guardian | Lucifer's Heritage | | Germany | 1984 | | |
| Bloc Party | Union | The Angel Range; Diet; Superheroes Of BMX | England | 1999 | | |
| Bloodhound Gang | Bang Chamber 8 | | United States | 1988 | | |
| Blood Stain Child | Visionquest | | Japan | 1999 | | |
| Bloodsimple | Fix 8 | | United States | 2002 | | |
| Blood Has Been Shed | Release | Driven | United States | 1993 | | |
| Blondie | Angel And The Snake | | United States | 1974 | | |
| Blue Öyster Cult | Soft White Underbelly | Oaxaca; Stalk-Forrest Group; Santos Sisters | United States | 1967 | | |
| Blur | Seymour | | England | 1988 | | |
| Bob Marley and the Wailers | The Wailers | The Wailing Rudeboys; The Wailing Wailers; The Teenagers | Jamaica | 1963 | | |
| Bodyjar | Damnation | Helium | Australia | 1990 | | |
| Bodyslam | ละอ่อน | | Thailand | 2002 | | |
| Bone Thugs-n-Harmony | The Band-Aid Boys | B.O.N.E. Enterpri$e | United States | 1991 | | |
| Bonfire | Cacumen | | Germany | 1972 | | |
| Born of Osiris | Diminished | Your Heart Engraved; Rosecrance | United States | 2003 | | |
| Bowling for Soup | Rubberneck | | United States | 1994 | | |
| The Boys | The Yobs | | England | 1976 | | |
| Boyz II Men | Unique Attraction | | United States | 1985 | | |
| The Boomtown Rats | The Nightlife Thugs | | Ireland | 1975 | | |
| Breaking Point | Broken | | United States | 1999 | | |
| Brides of Destruction | Cockstar | Motordog | United States | 2001 | | |
| B-Thong | Concrete Stuff | | Sweden | 1990 | | |
| Bullet for My Valentine | Jeff Killed John | | Wales | 1998 | | |
| Burn Season | Smakt Down | | United States | 1998 | | |
| Butthole Surfers | The Vodka Family Winstons | Nine CM Worm Makes Own Food | United States | 1981 | | |
| Bush | Bush With Gavin Rossdale | Future Primitive | England | 1992 | | Removed "Gavin Rossdale" from the name. |
| Busted | The Termites | | England | 2000 | | |
| Cadaver | Cadaver, Inc. | | Norway | 1999 | | |
| The Cadillac Three | The Cadillac Black | | United States | ? | | Replaced "Black" with "Three". |
| Cage the Elephant | Perfect Confusion | | United States | 2005 | | |
| The Cadillacs | The Carnations | | United States | 1953 | | |
| The Calling | Generation Gap | Next Door | United States | 1996 | | |
| Camel | Brew | | England | 1971 | | |
| Candlemass | Nemesis | | Sweden | 1982 | | |
| Candy Harlots | Helter Skelter | The Harlots | Australia | 1987 | | |
| Carcass | Disattack | | England | 1985 | | |
| Carnage | Global Carnage | | Sweden | 1988 | | Removed "Global" from the name. |
| Carpathian Forest | Enthrone | | Norway | 1990 | | |
| Cavalera | Inflikted | Max And Igor Cavalera; Cavalera Conspiracy | United States | 2007 | | |
| Cave In | The Sacrifice Poles | | United States | ? | | |
| Ceremonial Oath | Desecrator | | Sweden | 1989 | | |
| Chelsea Grin | Ahaziah | | United States | 2007 | | |
| The Chicks | Dixie Chicks | | United States | 1989 | | Removed "Dixie" from the name. |
| Chicago | The Big Thing | Chicago Transit Authority | United States | 1967 | | |
| Children of Bodom | Inearthed | | Finland | 1993 | | |
| Chumbawamba | Skin Disease | Antidote; Scab Aid | England | 1982 | | |
| Circle of Contempt | Thrust Moment | | Finland | 2006 | | |
| The Contortionist | At The Hands Of Machines | | United States | 2007 | | |
| The Cranberries | The Cranberry Saw Us | | Ireland | 1989 | | |
| The Crucified | Kids In God's Blessings | | United States | 1984 | | |
| The Cure | The Obelisk | Malice; Easy Cure | England | 1976 | | |
| Coal Chamber | She's In Pain | | United States | 1992 | | |
| Code Orange | Code Orange Kids | | United States | 2008 | | Removed "Kids" from the name. |
| Coheed and Cambria | Shabütie | | United States | 1995 | | |
| Cold | Grundig | Diablo | United States | 1986 | | |
| Coldplay | Pectoralz | Starfish; Big Fat Noises | England | 1996 | | |
| The Color of Violence | Skeleton Slaughter vs. Fetus Destroyer | | United States | 2002 | | |
| The Collectors | The C-FUN Classics | | Canada | 1961 | | |
| Combichrist | D.r.i.v.E | Hudlager | United States | 2003 | | |
| Converge | Shattered Void | | United States | 1995 | | |
| Cory Wells & The Enemys | The Vibrators | | United States | 1965 | | |
| Count Raven | Stormvarning | | Sweden | 1987 | | |
| Crimson Glory | Pierced Arrow | Beowulf | United States | 1979 | | |
| Cripple Bastards | Grimcorpses | | Italy | 1988 | | |
| Cro-Mags | Mode Of Ignorance | Disco Smoothy | United States | 1980 | | |
| Crossfade | The Nothing | Sugerdaddy Superstar | United States | 1991 | | |
| Crowbar | Shellshock | Aftershock; Wrequiem; The Slugs | United States | 1988 | | |
| The Crown | Crown Of Thorns | Dobermann | Sweden | 1990 | | Removed "Of Thorns" from the name. |
| Creed | Naked Toddler | Mattox Creed | United States | 1994 | | |
| Creedence Clearwater Revival | The Blue Velvets | Tommy Fogerty And The Blue Velvets; Vision; The Golliwogs | United States | 1959 | | |
| Cryptopsy | Obsessive Compulsive Disorder | Necrosis; Gomorra | Canada | 1988 | | |
| The Cult | Death Cult | | England | 1983 | | Removed "Death" from the name. |
| Dååth | Dirt Nap | | United States | 2000 | | |
| Dalriada | Steelium | Echo Of Dalriada | Hungary | 1998 | | |
| Damageplan | New-Found Power | | United States | 2003 | | |
| Dangerous Toys | Onyx | | United States | 1987 | | |
| Dark Age | Dyer's Eve | | Germany | 1994 | | |
| Darkthrone | Black Death | | Norway | 1986 | | |
| Dark New Day | Dark Blue | | United States | 2004 | | Replaced "Blue" with "New Day". |
| Dark Tranquillity | Septic Broiler | | Sweden | 1989 | | |
| Darkwoods My Betrothed | Virgin's Cunt | | Finland | 1993 | | |
| Daron Malakian and Scars on Broadway | Scars On Broadway | | United States | 2006 | | Added "Daron Malakian" to the name. |
| Day6 | 5Live | | Korea | 2014 | | |
| Dead Sara | Epiphany | | United States | 2002 | | |
| Death | Mantas | | United States | 1983 | | |
| Deathbound | Twilight | Unbound | Finland | 1995 | | |
| Deathchain | Winterwolf | | Finland | 1997 | | |
| Debauchery | Maggotcunt | | Germany | 2000 | | |
| December Avenue | Sense Of Sound | | Philippines | 2007 | | |
| Decyfer Down | Allysonhymn | Decyfer | United States | 1999 | | |
| Def Leppard | Atomic Mass | Accracy; Chemical Reactor | England | 1976 | | |
| Deicide | Carnage | Amon | United States | 1987 | | |
| Depeche Mode | Composition Of Sound | | England | 1980 | | |
| Depswa | Carcinogen | | United States | 1997 | | |
| Design the Skyline | Extra Large Kids | | United States | 2007 | | |
| Destiny's Child | Girl's Tyme | | United States | 1990 | | |
| Destruction | Knight Of Demon | | Germany | 1982 | | |
| Detonation | Infernal Dream | | Netherlands | 1997 | | |
| DevilDriver | Deathride | | United States | 2002 | | |
| Devilment | Brutal Grooves, Inc. | | England | 2001 | | |
| Die Kur | The Out Mind Zone | The Care | England | 1995 | | |
| Die Warzau | Die Warzau Synfony | | United States | 1987 | | Removed "Synfony" from the name. |
| The Dillinger Escape Plan | Arcane | | United States | 1996 | | |
| Dire Straits | Café Racers | | England | 1977 | | |
| Discordance Axis | Sedition | | United States | 1991 | | |
| Dishwalla | Life Talking | Dish | United States | 1990 | | |
| Dispatch | One Fell Swoop | | United States | 1996 | | |
| Disturbed | Brawl | | United States | 1994 | | |
| Dissection | Siren's Yell | | Sweden | 1988 | | |
| The Dixie Cups | The Meltones | Little Miss; The Muffets | United States | 1962 | | |
| Dixie Dregs | Dixie Grit | | United States | 1970 | | |
| Doom | The Subverters | | England | 1986 | | |
| Doc Holliday | Roundhouse | | United States | 1971 | | |
| Dog Fashion Disco | Hug The Retard | | United States | 1995 | | |
| The Donnas | The Electrocutes | Ragady Anne; Screem | United States | 1993 | | |
| doubleDrive | MK Ultra | | United States | 1996 | | |
| downset. | Social Justice | | United States | 1989 | | |
| D'Molls | The Chicago Molls | | United States | 1984 | | |
| DVSR | Devastator | | Australia | 2013 | | |
| Dream Theater | Majesty | | United States | 1985 | | |
| Dropout Kings | Phoenix Down | | United States | 2016 | | |
| Drottnar | Vitality | | Norway | 1996 | | |
| Dry Cell | Impúr | | United States | 1998 | | |
| Dry Kill Logic | Hinge | Hinge AD | United States | 1995 | | |
| Drug Restaurant | JJY Band | | Korea | 2015 | | |
| Dokken | Airborn | | United States | 1976 | | |
| Dubstar | The Joans | | England | 1992 | | |
| The Duskfall | Soulash | | Sweden | 1999 | | |
| Eat Me Raw | Eatmewhileimhot! | | United States | 2008 | | |
| Eastern Youth | Scanners | | Japan | 1989 | | |
| Elbow | Mr. Soft | Soft | England | 1990 | | |
| Electric Wizard | Lord Of Putrefaction | The Grief Eternal; Eternal | England | 1988 | | |
| Eleventyseven | Protective Custody | | United States | 2002 | | |
| Elysia | Elysium's Revenge | | United States | 2003 | | |
| Embalmer | Corpsegrinder | | United States | 1989 | | |
| Embodyment | Supplication | | United States | 1992 | | |
| Empire of the Sun | Steelemore | | Australia | ? | | |
| Enter Shikari | Hybryd | Shikari Sound System; Jonny And The Snipers | England | 1999 | | |
| Epica | Sahara Dust | | Netherlands | 2002 | | |
| Epoch of Unlight | Enraptured | Requiem | United States | 1994 | | |
| E-Rotic | IQ Check | | Germany | 1994 | | |
| Escape the Day | Mindscape | | Sweden | 2007 | | |
| Eso-Charis | Elliot | | United States | 1995 | | |
| Eths | What's The Fuck | | France | 1996 | | |
| Exciter | Hell Razor | | Canada | 1978 | | |
| Extreme | The Dream | | United States | 1985 | | |
| Ezo | Flatbacker | | Japan | 1982 | | |
| Europe | Force | | Sweden | 1979 | | |
| Evanescence | Childish Intentions | | United States | 1995 | | |
| Eve 6 | Yakoo | Eleventeen | United States | 1995 | | |
| Evoken | Funereus | Asmodeus | United States | 1992 | | |
| Excel | Chaotic Noise | | United States | 1983 | | |
| Face Down | Machine God | | Sweden | 1993 | | |
| Fairyland | Fantasia | | 1998 | | | |
| Faith No More | Sharp Young Men | Faith No Man | United States | 1979 | | |
| Falling in Reverse | From Behind These Walls | | United States | 2008 | | |
| Fallzone | Seven Wiser | | United States | 2002 | | |
| Family Force 5 | The Brothers | Ground Noise; The Phamily | United States | 1994 | | |
| Famous Last Words | A Walking Memory | Barlait | United States | 2008 | | |
| The Farm | The Excitements | | England | 1983 | | |
| Fastball | Star 69 | Magneto; Magneto U.S.A. Ed Clark's Business Bible; Starchy | United States | 1992 | | |
| Fear Factory | Ulceration | Fear The Factor | United States | 1989 | | |
| Feeder | Reel | Renegades | Wales | 1992 | | |
| Fenix TX | Riverfenix | | United States | 1995 | | Removed the part "River" and added "TX". |
| Fifth Harmony | Lylas | | United States | ? | | |
| Final Warning | Broken Trust | | United States | 1982 | | |
| Finger Eleven | Stone Soul Picnic | Rainbow Butt Monkeys | Canada | 1990 | | |
| Finley | Junkies | | Italy | 2002 | | |
| Fireworks | Bears | | United States | 2004 | | |
| Five Blind Boys of Mississippi | The Cotton Blossom Singers | | United States | 1936 | | |
| Fleshwrought | Fleshrot | | United States | ? | | |
| Flotsam and Jetsam | Paradox | Dreadlox; Dogz | United States | 1981 | | |
| Flyleaf | Passerby | | United States | 2002 | | |
| The Fluid | Madhouse | | United States | 1985 | | |
| Foje | Sunki Muzika | | Lithuania | 1983 | | |
| Forbidden | Forbidden Evil | | United States | 1985 | | Removed "Evil" from the name. |
| Foo Fighters | The Holy Shits | Dee Gees; The Churn Ups | United States | 1994 | | |
| Four Jacks and a Jill | The Nevadas | The Zombies | South Africa | 1964 | | |
| From the Shallows | From The Shallows Came The Sinners | | United States | 2004 | | |
| Fuel | Reel Too Real | Small The Joy; Re-fueled | United States | 1992 | | |
| Full Devil Jacket | Voodoo Hippies | | United States | 1997 | | |
| Full Scale | Full Scale Deflection | Full Scale Revolution | Australia | 1998 | | |
| Funeral for a Friend | January Thirst | | Wales | 2001 | | |
| The Funeral Pyre | Envilent | | United States | 2001 | | |
| Garbanotas | Garbanotas Bosistas | | Lithuania | 2008 | | Removed "Bosistas" from the name. |
| The Gates of Slumber | The Keep | | United States | 1997 | | |
| Gates of Ishtar | Disrupt | | Sweden | 1992 | | |
| The Georgia Satellites | Keith And The Satellites | | United States | 1980 | | Replaced "Keith" with "Georgia". |
| Genitorturers | The Festering Genitorturers | | United States | 1986 | | Removed "Festering" from the name. |
| Giant Sand | Giant Sandworms | | United States | 1980 | | Removed the part "Worms". |
| Gilla Band | Girl Band | | Ireland | 2011 | | Replaced "Girl" with "Gilla". |
| The Gits | Snivelling Little Rat Faced Gits | | United States | 1986 | | Removed "Snivelling Little Rat Faced Gits" from the name. |
| Glass Casket | Gadrel | | United States | 2001 | 2000 | 1990s |
| Goblin | Cherry Five | Italy | | 1971 | 1970s | |
| The Green Arrows | The Mambo Jazz Band | | South Rhodesia | 1966 | | |
| Godflesh | Officially Pronounced Dead | Fall Of Because | England | 1982 | | |
| Godhead | Blind | | United States | 1994 | | |
| Godsmack | The Scam | | United States | 1995 | | |
| God Macabre | Botten På Burken | Macabre End | Sweden | 1988 | | |
| Gojira | Godzilla | | France | 1996 | | |
| Golden Earring | The Tornadoes | Golden Earrings | Netherlands | 1961 | | |
| Goreaphobia | Infamy | | United States | 1986 | | |
| Noise A-Go-Go's | Gore Beyond Necropsy | | Japan | 1989 | | |
| Город | Gorgasm | | France | 1997 | | |
| Goo Goo Dolls | The Sex Maggots | | United States | 1985 | | |
| The Great Deceiver | Hide | | Sweden | ? | | |
| Grand Magus | Smack | | Sweden | 1996 | | |
| Grave | Corpse | Putrefaction | Sweden | 1986 | | |
| Grave Digger | Digger | Hawaii | Germany | 1986 | | |
| Great White | Highway | Livewire; Wires; DanteFox | United States | 1977 | | |
| Green Apple Quick Step | Inspector Luv | Ride Me Babys | United States | 1989 | | |
| Green Day | Blood Rage | Sweet Children | United States | 1987 | | |
| Gustafi | Gustaph Y Njegovi Dobri Duhovi | | Croatia | 1990 | | |
| Hawaii | Vixen | | United States | 1981 | | |
| Haemorrhage | Devourment | | Spain | 1990 | | |
| Head Phones President | Deep Last Blue | | Japan | ? | | |
| Heart | The Army | White Heart | United States | 1965 | | |
| Heavenly | Satan's Lawyer | | France | 1993 | | |
| Heavens Gate | Steeltower | | Germany | 1982 | | |
| Heaven Shall Burn | Before The Fall | Consense | Germany | 1995 | | |
| Hawthorne Heights | A Day In The Life | | United States | 2001 | | |
| Hecate Enthroned | Amethyist | Daemonum | England | 1992 | | |
| Heck | Baby Godzilla | | England | 2009 | | |
| Hedgehoppers Anonymous | The Trendsetters | | England | 1961 | | |
| Helix | The Helix Field Band | | Canada | 1974 | | Removed "Field Band" from the name. |
| Helloween | Gentry | Second Hell; Iron Fist | Germany | 1978 | | |
| Hades Almighty | Hades | | Norway | 1992 | | Added "Almighty" to the name. |
| Hellhammer | Hammerhead | | Switzerland | 1982 | | |
| Hollywood Undead | The Kids | | United States | 2005 | | |
| Horde | Beheadoth | | Australia | 1994 | | |
| Hoobastank | Hoobustank | | United States | 1994 | | |
| Huey Lewis and the News | Huey Lewis And The America Express | | United States | 1978 | | Replaced "American Express" with "News". |
| The Human League | The Future | | England | 1977 | | |
| Хурд | Скорость | | Mongolia | 1987 | | |
| Hyubris | Lupakajojo | | Portugal | 1998 | | |
| Iced Earth | The Rose | Purgatory | United States | 1984 | | |
| Ice Nine Kills | Ice Nine | | United States | 2000 | | Added "Kills" to the name. |
| Icon | Ice | The Schoolboys | United States | 1973 | | |
| IGNEA | Parallax | | Ukraine | 2013 | | |
| Ill Niño | El Niño | | United States | 1998 | | Added "Ill" to the name. |
| Immolation | Rigor Mortis | | United States | 1986 | | |
| The Impossibles | Fat Girls | | United States | 1994 | | |
| Indus Creed | Rock Machine | | India | 1984 | | |
| InMe | Drowned | | England | 1996 | | |
| Insane Clown Posse | JJ Boyz | Bloody Brothers; Inner City Posse | United States | 1989 | | |
| INXS | The Farriss Brothers | The Vegetables | Australia | 1977 | | |
| Iron Cross | Holy Cross | | Myanmar | 1989 | | Replaced "Holy" with "Iron". |
| Iron Fire | Misery | Decades Of Darkness | Denmark | 1995 | | |
| Isole | Forlorn | | Sweden | 1990 | | |
| Ivoryline | Dead End Driveway | | United States | 2003 | | |
| Jamie Wednesday | The Ballpoints | Peter Pan's Playground | England | 1984 | | |
| Jam & Spoon | Tokyo Ghetto Pussy | Storm; Big Room | Germany | ? | | |
| The Jamaicans | The Merricoles | | Jamaica | 1964 | | |
| Jaurim | Full Count | | Korea | 1993 | | |
| Jawbreaker | Rise | | United States | 1986 | | |
| The Jimmy Hendrix Experience | The Blue Flames | | United States | ? | | |
| Joy Division | Stiff Kittens | Warsaw | England | 1977 | | |
| Journey | Golden Gate Rhythm Section | | United States | 1973 | | |
| The Jubalaires | The Royal Harmony Singers | | United States | 1935 | | |
| Judas Priest | Freight | | England | 1969 | | |
| June | Drive Like June | | United States | 2002 | | Removed "Drive Like" from the name. |
| Just Surrender | A Second Chance | | United States | 2003 | | |
| Kaiser Chiefs | Runston Parva | Parva | England | | | |
| Kajagoogoo | Art Nouveau | Kaja | England | | | |
| Kataklysm | Northern Hyperblast | | Canada | 1991 | | |
| Kalmah | Ancestor | | Finland | | | |
| Kevorkian Death Cycle | Grid | | | | | |
| Kick Axe | Hobbit | Spectre General | Canada | 1974 | | |
| Kilgore | Regicide | Stain; Smudge; Kilgore Smudge | United States | | | |
| Killer Dwarfs | Sphinx | | Canada | 1981 | | |
| Killing Moon | WhipKraft | | United States | 2004 | | |
| King 810 | King | | United States | 2007 | | Added "810" to the name. |
| Kingfisher Sky | Jambone | | Netherlands | 2001 | | |
| The Kings of Nuthin' | The Boston Blackouts | | United States | 1999 | | |
| King's X | The Edge | Sneak Preview | United States | | | |
| Kiss | Rainbow | Wicked Lester | United States | | | |
| Kix | The Shooze | The Generators; The Baltimore Cocks | United States | | | |
| Knocked Loose | Manipulator | | United States | 2013 | | |
| Konkhra | Vicious Circle | | Denmark | 1989 | | |
| Korpiklaani | Shamaani Duo | Shaman | Finland | 1993 | | |
| Kool & the Gang | The Jazziacs | | United States | 1964 | | |
| Kreator | Metal Militia | Tyrant; Tormentor | Germany | 1982 | | |
| Krieg | Imperial | | United States | 1995 | | |
| Kutless | Call Box | | United States | 1999 | | |
| Lȧȧz Rockit | Depth Charge | | United States | 1981 | | |
| Labelle | The Ordettes | Patti LaBelle And The Blue Belles; Patti LaBelle And Her Blue Belles | United States | 1960 | | |
| Lacuna Coil | Sleep Of Right | Ethereal | Italy | 1999 | | |
| Lamb of God | Burn The Priest | | United States | 1994 | | |
| The Stanley Brothers | The Lazy Ramblers | | United States | ? | | |
| Legion of the Damned | Occult | | Netherlands | 1992 | | |
| Legendary Shack Shakers | Those | | United States | 1995 | | |
| Lemon Demon | Trapezoid | Deporitaz | United States | ? | | |
| Lemon Joy | Этаж 3 | Lemon's Joy | Lithuania | 1994 | | |
| The Lemonheads | The Whelps | | United States | 1985 | | |
| Leeway | The Unruled | | United States | 1983 | | |
| Led Zeppelin | The New Yardbirds | | England | 1963 | | |
| Liberteer | Citizen | | United States | 2004 | | |
| The Libertines | The Strand | | England | 1997 | | |
| Lifer | Bloodmouth | Driver; Strangers With Candy | 1999 | | | |
| Light the Torch | Devil You Know | | United States | 2012 | | |
| Lillian Axe | The Oz | | United States | 1983 | | |
| Linkin Park | Xero | Hybrid Theory | United States | 1996 | | |
| Live | Public Affection | | United States | | | |
| Loathe | Our Imbalance | | England | | | |
| Lotus Eater | As Daylight Fades | | England | 2014 | | |
| A Loss for Words | Last Ride | | United States | 1999 | | |
| Lullacry | Coarse | | Finland | | | |
| Luna Mortis | The Ottoman Empire | | United States | | | |
| Madam X | Pantagruel | Hell's Belles | United States | | | |
| Madder Mortem | Mystery Tribe | | Norway | | | |
| Mägo de Oz | Transilvania | | Spain | ? | | |
| Majestica | ReinXeed | | Sweden | 2000 | | |
| Makoma | Nouveau Testament | | Zaire | 1993 | | |
| Manes | Perifa | Obscuro | Norway | | | |
| Man-go | Mango | | Lithuania | 1998 | | |
| Man Is the Bastard | Charred Remains | | United States | 1990 | | |
| Marilyn Manson | Marilyn Manson & The Spooky Kids | | United States | | | Removed "Spooky Kids" from the name. |
| Maroon 5 | Kara's Flowers | Maroon | United States | 1994 | | |
| Master | Death Strike | | United States | 1983 | | |
| Means | Means 2 An End | | Canada | 2001 | | Removed "2 An End" from the name. |
| Megadeth | Fallen Angels | | United States | 1983 | | |
| Memphis May Fire | Oh Captain, My Captain | | United States | | | |
| Merciless | Obsessed | Black Mass | Sweden | 1986 | | |
| Meshuggah | Metallien | | Sweden | 1985 | | |
| Midnight Oil | Farm | | Australia | 1972 | | |
| Mind Funk | Mind Fuck | | United States | ? | | Replaced "Fuck" with "Funk". |
| Myrath | X-Tazy | | Tunisia | | | |
| My Epic | The Right Wing Conspiracy | | United States | 1998 | | |
| Mob 47 | Censor | | Sweden | 1982 | | |
| Modern Day Zero | Mesh | Mesh STL | United States | 1995 | | |
| Monarchy | Milke | | England | 2005 | | |
| Monster Magnet | Dog Of Mystery | Airport 75; Triple Bad Acid; King Fuzz | United States | 1989 | | |
| Monty Are I | Monty's Fan Club | Monty | United States | 1998 | | |
| Morbid Angel | Ice | Heretic | United States | 1983 | | |
| Morgoth | Cadaverous Smell | Minas Morgul | Germany | 1986 | | |
| Mortification | Lightforce | | Australia | 1990 | | |
| The Mothers of Invention | The Soul Giants | The Mothers; Ruben And The Jets | United States | 1964 | | |
| Motionless in White | One Way Ticket | When Breathing Stops | United States | 2004 | | |
| Mother Love Bone | Lords Of The Wasteland | | United States | 1987 | | |
| Motörhead | Bastard | | England | 1975 | | |
| Moonmaids | North Texas Swingtet | | United States | 1943 | | |
| Moonspell | Morbid God | | Portugal | 1989 | | |
| Mr. | White Noise | | China | 2007 | | |
| Mr. President | Satellite One | | Germany | ? | | |
| Msondo Ngoma | NUTA Jazz Band | Juwata Jazz Band; OTTU Jazz Band | Tanzania | 1964 | | |
| Mt. Helium | The Apex Theory | | United States | 1999 | | |
| Mucky Pup | Predator | | United States | 1986 | | |
| Muse | Carnage Mayhem | Gothic Plague; Rocket Baby Dolls | England | 1993 | | |
| The Nation of Ulysses | Ulysses | | England | 1988 | | Removed "Nation Of" from the name |
| Tipo Grupė | Naujieji Lietuviai | | | | | |
| New Kids on the Block | Nynuk | | United States | 1984 | | |
| New Musik | End Of The World | | England | 1977 | | |
| Neutral Milk Hotel | Milk | | United States | | | Added "Neutral" and "Hotel" to the name. |
| Nickelback | Point Of View | Village Idiot; Brick | Canada | 1992 | | |
| Night Ranger | Stereo | Ranger | United States | 1979 | | |
| Nirvana | Skid Row | Pen Cap Chew; Bliss; Ted Ed Fred | United States | 1987 | | |
| Nokturnal Mortum | Suppuration | Crystalline Darkness | Ukraine | 1994 | | |
| No-Man | No Man Is An Island Except The Isle Of Man | | England | 1987 | | Removed "Is An Island Except The Isle Of Man" from the name. |
| Nonpoint | Nonpoint Factor | | United States | 1993 | | Removed "Factor" from the name. |
| Norther | Requiem | Decayed | Finland | 1996 | | |
| Norma Jean | Luti-Kriss | | United States | 1997 | | |
| The Nosebleeds | Ed Banger And The Nosebleeds | | England | 1976 | | Removed "Ed Banger" from the name. |
| Novembers Doom | Laceration | | United States | 1989 | | |
| Novembre | Catacomb | | Italy | 1990 | | |
| No One | Black Talon | | United States | 1994 | | |
| Nuuk Posse | ? | | Greenland | 1985 | | |
| The Oak Ridge Boys | Wally Fowler And The Georgia Clodhoppers | | United States | 1943 | | |
| Oasis | The Rain | | England | 1991 | | |
| Oh! Brothers | Orgasm Brothers | | Korea | 1998 | | Replaced "Orgasm" with "Oh!". |
| Obituary | Executioner | | United States | 1984 | | |
| The Obsessed | Warhorse | | United States | 1976 | | |
| Obscura | Illegimitation | | Germany | 2000 | | |
| The Offspring | Manic Subsidal | | United States | 1984 | | |
| Ohio Players | The Ohio Untouchables | | United States | 1967 | | Replaced "Untouchables" with "Players". |
| The O'Jays | The Triumphs | The Mascots | United States | 1958 | | |
| Odd Crew | Каскадьори | | Bulgaria | 1998 | | |
| On Thorns I Lay | Paralysis | Phlebotomy | Greece | 1992 | | |
| OneRepublic | This Beautiful Mess | | United States | 1996 | | |
| One Minute Silence | Near Death Experience | | England | 1993 | | |
| Opeth | Eruption | | Sweden | 1987 | | |
| Opus | A.S.K. | | England | 1992 | | |
| Orange Goblin | Our Haunted Kingdom | | England | 1995 | | |
| Orange Juice | Nu-Sonics | | | | | |
| Origin | Necrotomy | Thee Abomination | United States | 1990 | | |
| Original Dixieland Jass Band | Stein's Dixie Jass Band | | United States | 1916 | | Replaced "Stein's Dixie" with "Original Dixieland". |
| The Orioles | The Vibra-Naires | | United States | 1947 | | |
| Orphaned Land | Resurrection | | Palestine | ? | | |
| Освајачи | Освајачи All Stars | | Serbia | 1990 | | |
| Outkast | Two Shades Deep | Misfits | United States | | | |
| Outlaws | The Four Letter Words | | United States | 1967 | | |
| Overkill | Virgin Killer | | United States | 1980 | | |
| The Outfield | The Baseball Boys | | England | 1984 | | |
| Passenger | Cliff | | Sweden | 1995 | | |
| Paul Revere & the Raiders | Downbeats | | United States | 1958 | | |
| Pearl Jam | Mookie Blaylock | | United States | 1990 | | |
| People in Planes | Tetra Splendour | Robots In The Sky | Wales | 1998 | | |
| Phantogram | Charlie Everywhere | | United States | 2007 | | |
| Phantomsmasher | Atomsmasher | | United States | | | Changed the part "Atom" to "Phantom". |
| Phish | Blackwood Convention | | United States | 1983 | | |
| Picture Me Broken | Lane Four | | United States | 2005 | | |
| Pilot Speed | Pilate | | Canada | 1999 | | |
| Pink Floyd | Sigma 6 | Meggadeaths; The Screaming Abdabs; Leonard's Lodgers; The Spectrum Five; Tea Set | England | 1963 | | |
| Pixies | Pixies In Panoply | | United States | 1986 | | Removed "In Panoply" from the name. |
| Placebo | Ashtray Heart | | England | 1994 | | |
| Polyenso | Oceana | | United States | 2007 | | |
| The Presidents of the United States of America | The Lo-Fis | The Dynamic Duo; Pure Frosting | United States | 1993 | | |
| Procol Harum | The Pinewoods | The Paramounts; Liquorice John Death | England | 1967 | | |
| Protest the Hero | Happy Go Lucky | | Canada | 1999 | | |
| P.O.D. | Eschatos | | United States | 1991 | | |
| Poco | Pogo | | United States | 1968 | | |
| The Pogues | Pogue Mahone | | England | 1982 | | |
| Poison | Paris | | United States | 1980 | | |
| Poison the Well | Doubting Thomas | An Acre Lost | United States | 1997 | | |
| Pop Will Eat Itself | From Eden | Wild And Wandering | England | | | |
| The Psychedelic Furs | RKO | Radio; The Europeans | England | 1977 | | |
| Psyopus | Stranglefuck | | 2002 | | | |
| Public Enemy | Spectrum City | | United States | 1985 | | |
| Queen | Smile | | England | 1968 | | |
| Queensrÿche | Cross+Fire | The Mob | United States | 1980 | | |
| Queens of the Stone Age | Gamma Ray | | United States | 1996 | | |
| Rabbitt | The Conglomeration | | South Africa | 1972 | | |
| Rage | Avenger | | Germany | 1983 | | |
| Radiohead | On A Friday | | England | 1985 | | |
| Rammstein | Tempelprayers | | Germany | 1993 | | |
| Rare Earth | The Sunliners | | United States | 1960 | | |
| Ratt | Mickey Ratt | | United States | 1976 | | Removed "Mickey" from the name |
| Raw Radar War | Septic Youth Command | | United States | 2002 | | |
| Reckless Love | Reckless Life | | Finland | | | Replaced "Life" with "Love" |
| Red Hot Chili Peppers | Tony Flow And The Miraculously Majestic Masters Of Mayhem | | United States | 1982 | | |
| The Replacements | Dogbreath | Impediments | United States | 1978 | | |
| Repulsion | Tempter | Ultraviolence; Genocide | United States | 1984 | | |
| Revocation | Cryptic Warning | | United States | 2000 | | |
| For Squirrels | For Squirrels | Subrosa | United States | ? | | |
| Rhapsody of Fire | Thundercross | Rhapsody | Italy | 1993 | | |
| Rise Against | Transistor Revolt | | United States | 1999 | | |
| R.E.M. | Hornets Attack Victor Mature | Bingo Hand Job; It Crawled From The South; Twisted Kites; Negro Eyes; Cans Of Piss | United States | 1980 | | |
| Rock City Angels | The Abusers | Delta City Rebels; Delta Rebels | United States | 1981 | | |
| Rostros Ocultos | Montana | | Mexico | 1985 | | |
| La Roux | Automan | | England | 2006 | | |
| The Roots | Radio Activity | Black To The Future; The Square Roots | United States | ? | | |
| Runemagick | Desiderius | | Sweden | 1990 | | |
| Sabaton | Aeon | | Sweden | 1999 | | |
| Sacred Warrior | Nomad | | United States | 1985 | | |
| Sacrilege | Warwound | | England | 1984 | | |
| Saint Vitus | Tyrant | | United States | 1978 | | |
| Sankomota | Uhuru | | Lesotho | 1976 | | |
| Saturnus | Asesino | | Denmark | 1991 | | |
| Saurom | Saurom Lamderth | | Spain | 1996 | | Removed "Lamderth" from the name. |
| Savatage | Metropolis U.S.A. | Avatar | United States | 1977 | | |
| Savage Garden | Crush | Bliss | Australia | 1993 | | |
| Savage Grace | Marquis De Sade | | United States | 1981 | | |
| Schizophonic | Schizophonic Love Symphony | | Canada | 2010 | | Removed "Love Symphony" from the name. |
| Scorpions | Nameless | | Germany | 1965 | | |
| Selena Gomez & the Scene | The Scene | | United States | 2008 | | Added "Selena Gomez" to the name. |
| Seether | Saron Gas | | South Africa | 1998 | | |
| Šeškės | 69 Danguje | | Lithuania | 2005 | | |
| Shadow Gallery | Sorcerer | | United States | | | |
| Sham 69 | Jimmy And The Ferrets | | England | 1975 | | |
| Shihad | Exit | Pacifier | New Zealand | 1988 | | |
| Shy | Trojan | | England | | | |
| Shotgun Messiah | Kingpin | | Sweden | 1985 | | |
| Silly Fools | Silly Foolish | | Thailand | 1996 | | Changed the adjective "Foolish" to the noun "Fools". |
| Segression | Eezee | | Australia | 1990 | | |
| Sentenced | Utmost Deformity | Deformity | Finland | 1988 | | |
| Sevendust | Snake Nation | Rumble fish Crawlspace | United States | 1994 | | |
| Shape of Despair | Raven | | Finland | 1995 | | |
| Sheavy | Green Machine | | Canada | 1993 | | |
| The Shins | Flake | Flake Music | United States | 1996 | | |
| The Showdown | 2540 | | United States | 1999 | | |
| The Silence and the Serenity | Bless The Fallen | | United States | 2005 | | |
| Silverchair | The Silly Men | Innocent Criminals | Australia | 1992 | | |
| Silversun Pickups | A Couple Of Couples | | United States | 2002 | | |
| Simon & Garfunkel | Tom & Jerry | | United States | 1956 | | |
| System of a Down | Soil | | United States | 1992 | | |
| Skid Row | Skip Rope | | United States | 1986 | | |
| Skrape | Jojo | | United States | 1997 | | |
| Slade | The N' Betweens | Ambrose Slade | England | 1966 | | |
| Slipknot | Pygsystem | Meld | United States | | | |
| Smile Empty Soul | Hecklers Veto | | United States | 1998 | | |
| Snow Patrol | Shrug | Polar Bear | Scotland | 1994 | | |
| Society Burning | The Watchmen | | United States | 1991 | | |
| The Soft Pack | The Muslims | | United States | 2007 | | |
| Solitude Aeturnus | Solitude | | 1987 | | Added "Aeturnus" to the name. | |
| Sonata Arctica | Tricky Beans | Tricky Means | Finland | 1995 | | |
| Soilwork | Inferior Breed | | Sweden | 1995 | | |
| Solution 13 | Confusion Red | | Finland | 2000 | | |
| Sonic Syndicate | Fallen Angels | | Sweden | 2002 | | |
| Sonny & Cher | Caesar And Cleo | | United States | 1964 | | |
| Sore Throat | Soar Throat | Saw Throat | England | 1987 | | |
| SouthGang | Byte The Bullet | | United States | 1988 | | |
| Soul Asylum | Loud Fast Rules | | 1981 | | | |
| The Soulless | Ignominious Incarceration | | England | 2006 | | |
| Souls at Zero | Atlantis | Tyrant; Wrathchild; Wrathchild America | United States | 1979 | | |
| Spandau Ballet | The Roots | The Cut The Makers | England | 1976 | | |
| Sparks | Halfnelson | | United States | ? | | |
| The Specials | The Automatics | Coventry Automatics | England | 1977 | | |
| Spice Girls | Touch | | England | 1994 | | |
| Spin Doctors | The Trucking Company | | United States | 1988 | | |
| Stake | Steak Number Eight | | Belgium | 2004 | | |
| Static-X | Drill | Static | United States | 1994 | | |
| Status Quo | Scorpions | The Paladins; The Spectres; Traffic Jam | England | 1962 | | |
| Steelheart | Red Alert | | United States | 1987 | | |
| Steel Panther | Metal Shop | Danger Kitty; Metal Skool | 2000 | | | |
| Stepa | Philp | | United States | 1998 | | |
| Stereophonics | Tragic Love Company | | Wales | 1992 | | |
| Stress | Pingo D'água | | Brazil | 1974 | | |
| The Stone | Stone To Flesh | | Serbia | 1996 | | Removed "To Flesh" from the name. |
| The Stone Roses | The Angry Young Teddy Bears | | England | 1989 | | |
| Stone Sour | Super Ego | Closure | United States | 1992 | | |
| Stone Temple Pilots | Swing | Mighty Joe Young; Shirleys Temple's Pussy | United States | 1987 | | |
| Story of the Year | 67 North | Big Blue Monkey | United States | 1995 | | |
| The Stooges | Psychedelic Stooges | | United States | 1967 | | Removed "Psychedelic" from the name. |
| Strawbs | Strawberry Hill Boys | | England | 1964 | | |
| Stryken | Stryker | | United States | ? | | |
| Stryper | Roxx Regime | | United States | 1983 | | |
| Sugar Ray | Shrinky Dinx | | United States | 1986 | | |
| Suidakra | Gloryfication | | Germany | 1994 | | |
| Sum 41 | Kaspir | Pain For Pleasure | Canada | 1994 | | |
| Sunk Loto | Messiah | | Australia | 1997 | | |
| Sunny Day Real Estate | Empty Set | | United States | 1992 | | |
| The Supremes | The Primettes | Diana Ross & The Supremes | United States | 1959 | | |
| Superjoint | Superjoint Ritual | | 1993 | | Removed "Ritual" from the name. | |
| Supergrass | The Jennifers | Theodore Supergrass | England | ? | | |
| The Sweet | The Sweetshop | | England | 1968 | | Removed the part "Shop" from the name. |
| Switchfoot | Chip Up | | United States | 1996 | | |
| Sworn Enemy | Downfall | Mindset | United States | 1997 | | |
| Tabou Combo | Los Incognitos | | Haiti | 1968 | | |
| Tantric | C-14 | | United States | 1999 | | |
| The Templars | Lords Of The Sword | | United States | ? | | |
| Terrorizer | Unknown Death | Decomposed | United States | 1985 | | |
| Tesla | Earthshaker | City Kidd | United States | 1981 | | |
| Theatre of Tragedy | Suffering Grief | La Reine Noir | Norway | 1993 | | |
| They Might Be Giants | El Grupo De Rock And Roll | | United States | 1981 | | |
| Therion | Blitzkrieg | Megatherion | Sweden | 1987 | | |
| Thousand Foot Krutch | Oddball | | Canada | 1995 | | |
| Three Days Grace | Groundswell | | Canada | 1992 | | |
| Thurisaz | ModiliuM | | Belgium | 1997 | | |
| Tiamat | Treblinka | | Sweden | 1987 | | |
| To/Die/For | Mary-Ann | | Finland | 1993 | | |
| The Treniers | The Trenier Twins | | United States | 1947 | | |
| Tribulation | Hazard | | Sweden | 2001 | | |
| Trio Matamoros | Trio Oriental | | Cuba | 1925 | | Replaced "Oriental" with "Matamoros". |
| Tower of Power | The Motowns | | United States | 1968 | | |
| Trail of Tears | Natt | | Norway | 1994 | | |
| Trust Company | 41Down | | United States | 1997 | | |
| T.S.O.L. | Vicious Circle | | United States | | | |
| Tura Satana | Manhole | | United States | 1994 | | |
| Type O Negative | New Minority | Repulsion; Sub-Zero | United States | 1989 | | |
| Twisted Sister | Bent Brother | Silverstar | United States | 1972 | | |
| Two | Gimp | | England | 1996 | | |
| Ulcerate | Bloodwreath | | New Zealand | 2000 | | |
| Ultravox | Tiger Lily | | England | 1974 | | |
| Uncle Slam | The Screaming Fetus | The Brood | United States | 1984 | | |
| Unholy | Holy Hell | | Finland | 1990 | | |
| Unified Theory | Luma | | United States | 1998 | | |
| UnSun | UnSeen | | Poland | 2006 | | |
| Unto Others | Idle Hands | | United States | 2017 | | |
| U2 | Feedback | The Hype | Ireland | 1976 | | |
| Üçnoktabir | Spitney Beers | | Turkey | 2002 | | |
| Van Halen | The Broken Combs | Trojan Rubber Co. Genesis; Mammoth | United States | 1964 | | |
| Vardøger | Hidden Paradise | | Norway | | | |
| Vaux | Eiffel | | United States | 1997 | | |
| Vein.fm | Vein | | United States | 2013 | | Removed ".Fm" from the name. |
| Vektor | Locrian | | United States | | | |
| Venom | Guillotine | Dwarfstar | England | 1978 | | |
| Versa | VersaEmerge | | United States | 2006 | | |
| Vesperian Sorrow | Unholy Descent | | United States | 1998 | | |
| Vintersorg | Vargatron | | Sweden | 1994 | | |
| Vitacit | Smetiště | | Czechia | 1973 | | |
| Volo Volo de Boston | Haiti Combo | | Haiti | 1969 | | |
| W.A.S.P. | Sister | | United States | 1976 | | |
| Wage War | Empires | War Within | United States | 2010 | | |
| War | Eric Burdon And War | | United States | 1969 | | Removed "Eric Burdon" from the name. |
| Warlock | Snakebite | | Germany | 1980 | | |
| We Came as Romans | This Emergency | | United States | ? | | |
| Widespread Panic | Severe Driving Problems | | United States | 1981 | | |
| Winds of Plague | Bleak December | | United States | 2002 | | |
| Within Temptation | The Circle | Voyage; The Portal | Netherlands | 1992 | | |
| Winterville | The Others | The Keytones | England | 2003 | | |
| Wytch Hazel | Jerusalem | | England | 2011 | | |
| Wolfbrigade | Wolfpack | | Sweden | 1995 | | Changed the part "Pack" with "Brigade". |
| The Who | The Detours | The High Numbers | England | 1959 | | |
| X Japan | X | | Japan | 1982 | | Added "Japan" to the name. |
| XTC | Star Park | The Helium Kidz | England | 1972 | | |
| Young the Giant | The Jakes | | United States | 2004 | | |
| Young Knives | Simple Pastoral Existence | Ponyclub | England | 1995 | | |
| YouInSeries | Brown Eyed Deception | | United States | 2003 | | |
| Zonaria | Seal Precious | | Sweden | 2001 | | |
| Žeteoci | Bijeli Korali | | Croatia | 1966 | | |

== Other topics ==
- List of band name etymologies
