= Officium Triste =

Dutch death-doom band

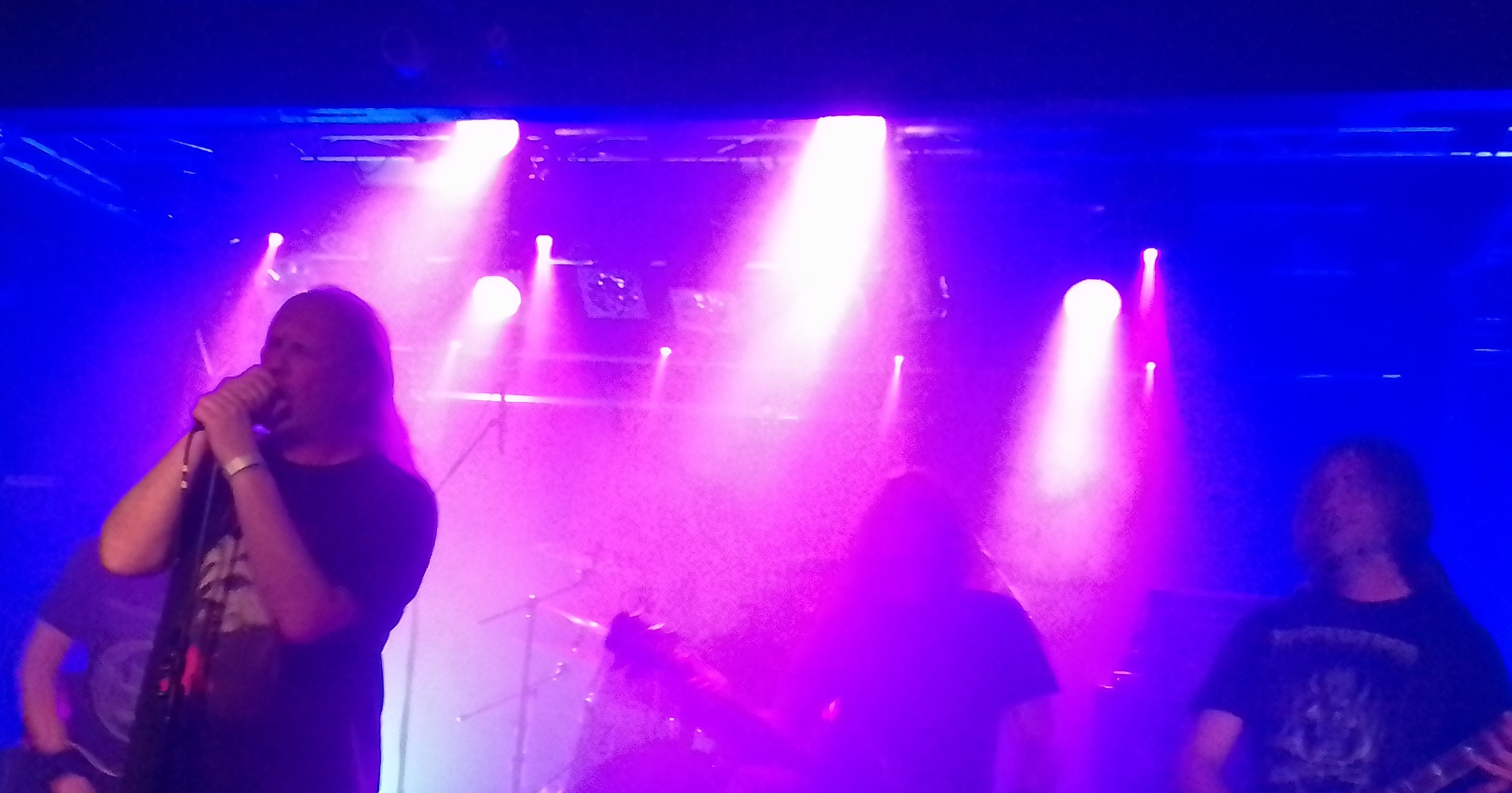
- Officium Triste at Dutch Doom Days 2021

Background information
- Origin: Rotterdam, Netherlands
- Genres: Death-doom, doom metal
- Years active: 1994–present
- Members: Pim Blankenstein; William van Dijk; Martin Kwakernaak; Niels Jordaan; Gerard de Jong; Theo Plaisier
- Past members: Johan Kwakernaak; Maarten v.d. Giessen; Johan Mijnster; Johan Tonnon; Ronald Lagerwaard; Bram Bijlhout; Lawrence Meyer
- Website: officiumtriste.com

Officium Triste is a Dutch death-doom band from Rotterdam. They refer to their style often as "Rotterdoom". Their music is inspired by bands like My Dying Bride and early Anathema. The vocals are mostly death grunts but with occasional clean vocals. Their home-venue is Baroeg in Rotterdam.

== History ==
The origins of Officium Triste trace back to the early 1990s when Martin and Johan made the decision to establish a metal band. Initially named Reïncremated, the band underwent a significant transformation in the spring of 1994 when the final lineup opted to disband and regroup under a new name, adopting a distinct musical direction.

The new moniker became Officium Triste. The start of Officium Triste went pretty smooth and new songs were composed quickly. This resulted in the decision to record a demo, which was recorded at the Elektra in Sliedrecht on the 4 and 5 August 1994. The recordings were low-budget and made using a 4-track recorder.

This recording session resulted in the Demo '94 which included three songs and an intro. The reactions from the underground scene were positive and eventually, all 200 copies were sold out. The music on this demo resulted in a deal with a label called Fuck You Records for a 7-inch EP. Officium Triste entered the Excess studio in Rotterdam on 19 and 20 February 1995 to record two new songs and an intro. Due to supposed lack of money the label did nothing. After a delay of a year, the band decided to release the EP by themselves. Vocalist Pim started Weeping Willow Records and released the EP Mountains Of Depressiveness pressed on red vinyl limited to 500 copies in the summer of 1996. In the meantime, during the summer of 1995, bass player Maarten quit the band and was replaced by Johan. Although the recordings were over a year old by the time they were released, the reactions within the scene were very good. This resulted in a deal with Dutch underground label Teutonic Existence Records for an album. The band entered Excess studio again to record the CD in December 1996. They recorded five new songs and re-recorded two songs from the demo and one from the EP in slightly different versions. In February 1997, the recording sessions were finished. The album Ne Vivam was released late April of the same year. It showcased the band's sound of heavy and melodic doom metal.

The next recordings Officium Triste made were three new tracks (again using Excess studio) for a split MiniCD release with Cold Mourning from Monterey, California, United States. This MCD was also released through Weeping Willow Records, containing two songs by each band. Officium Triste were also featured on a compilation CD released by Innocent Record Productions from the Netherlands. The track featured was "Dreams Of Sorrow" of the Ne Vivam album. This compilation did not receive much attention.

In September 1998, some irritation between the band members led to the decision to disband. They played a successful goodbye-gig, again supporting Anathema, in their hometown Rotterdam at Baroeg. They also decided to release one more CD-single. This CD contained 'left-overs' from the last two recording sessions: "Roses on my Grave" was recorded at the same time as the songs for the split-MCD and had never before been released and "Headstone" was a cover song from the English band Chorus of Ruin, recorded during the Ne Vivam session. In the meantime Martin, Johan and Pim decided to continue and created a new band, XI:LIX (also known as Eleven Fiftynine or 11:59). A new guitarist, also named Johan, was recruited and they started working on new songs. After seven months the former members of Officium Triste decided to meet in the pub to have a drink for old-times sake and decided to reform the band. Johan the new guitarist was also taken in the line-up, leading to a line-up featuring 3 guitarists.

In January 2000, Officium Triste recorded two new songs, "Pathway of Broken Glass" and "Divinity" for a promo. The song "Roses on my Grave" was also included. This promo was sent to labels for a possible deal. During April 2000, 'new man' Johan wanted to quit due to lack of time. July 2000, the band let bass-player Johan go. He was replaced by Lawrence who used to play guitar in Death Sentence and drums in Liar of Golgotha. The release of the promo lead to a two-album deal with Displeased Records from the Netherlands. The band entered Valvesound studios in Schiedam, the Netherlands in April 2001 to record a second full-length album. In 10 days it was recorded and mixed. The album was called The Pathway and contains seven songs. Meanwhile, the band did some live performances with the new line-up. In October 2001 the album The Pathway was released as well as a re-issue of the self-financed "Goodbye" MiniCD Roses on my Grave a limited 7-inch EP with a slightly different cover.

The band started working on new material for their third opus and decided to record the next album in their own studio "El Pato" run by guitarist Johan. The band recorded a demo consisting of one song and Displeased gave green light to record the next album at "El Pato". During December 2003 and March 2004 they recorded the five-track album Reason. A lot of shows were done to promote this album directly after the release.

In 2005, the band re-released a CD version of the debut album Ne Vivam through Russia's Serpent's Lair Productions. This album already was re-released on vinyl in 2003 on Badger Records. At this time the band also started to think about their next release since they once again signed a deal for two albums with Displeased Records. At the end of 2006 Officium Triste felt they were ready to record their fourth album and booked the Excess Studio in Rotterdam. In the first week of January 2007 most parts of the album were recorded and in February the guitar parts were recorded at the band's own El Pato studio. In May the album called Giving Yourself Away featuring six new songs was released. At the same time guitarist Johan decided to leave the band after 13 years. His replacement is Bram Bijlhout, former guitarist/vocalist for the Dutch band Imbolc.

== Members ==
=== Current members ===
- Pim Blankenstein – vocals (1994–present)
- Gerard de Jong – lead guitar (1994–present)
- Martin Kwakernaak – keyboards (1994–present), drums (1994–2008)
- Niels Jordaan – drums (2009–present)
- William van Dijk – rhythm guitar (2014–present)
- Theo Plaisier – bass guitar (2016–present)

=== Former members ===
- Maarten v.d. Giessen – bass guitar (1994–1995)
- Johan Kwakernaak – guitar (1994–2007)
- Johan Mijnster – bass guitar (1995–2000)
- Johan Tonnon – rhythm guitar (1999–2000)
- Lawrence Meyer – bass guitar (2000–2015)
- Bram Bijlhout – rhythm guitar (2007–2014)
- Ronald Lagerwaard – drums (2008–2009)

== Discography ==
- Demo '94 (demo, 1994)
- Mountains of Depressiveness (7-inch EP, 1996)
- Ne Vivam (1997, re-released 2005)
- Split with Cold Mourning (split, 1998)
- Roses on My Grave (MCD, 1999, re-released 2001)
- Promo 2000 (demo, 2000)
- The Pathway (2001, re-released 2007)
- Reason (2004)
- Giving Yourself Away (2007)
- Charcoal Hearts (compilation, 2009)
- Immersed (split with Ophis, 2012)
- Mors Viri (2013)
- Broken Memories (split with Lapsus Dei, 2018)
- The Death of Gaia (2019)
- Hortus Venenum (2024)
