= Giving Yourself Away =

Studio album by Officium Triste
- Released: 2007
- Genre: Death-doom, doom metal
- Length: 47:46
- Label: Displeased Records

Officium Triste chronology
Reason (2004)	Giving Yourself Away (2007)	Mors Viri (2013)

Giving Yourself Away is the fourth album by Officium Triste, released in 2007 by Displeased Records.

The album consist of 6 tracks.

== Track listing ==
1. "Your Eyes" – 9:48
2. "My Charcoal Heart" – 5:27
3. "Signals" – 7:25
4. "On the Crossroads of Souls" – 8:04
5. "Inside the Mind" – 8:48
6. "Master of Your Own Demise" – 8:14

== Personnel ==
- Pim Blankenstein – vocals
- Johan Kwakernaak – rhythm guitar
- Martin Kwakernaak – drums, keyboards
- Gerard de Jong – lead guitar
- Lawrence Meyer – bass guitar
