= Schizophonia =

Term to describe the splitting of an original sound and its electroacoustic reproduction

Schizophonia is a term coined by R. Murray Schafer to describe the splitting of an original sound and its electroacoustic reproduction. This concept comes from the invention of electroacoustic equipment for the transmission of sound, which meant that any sound could be recorded and sent anywhere around the world. Originally, that was not possible, as every sound was an original and could only be heard once. Schizophonia is the separation of this native sound and the recording of it; and the term focusses on the detrimental effects of this for individuals and societies at large.

== In popular culture ==
- Mike Batt released an album in 1977 entitled Schizophonia
- Rinôçérôse released an album in 2005 entitled Schizophonia
- A number of albums are entitled the related term Schizophonic

== See also ==
- Acousmatic sound
- Acoustic ecology
- Schismogenesis
- Sound culture
- Soundscape
