= Reason (Officium Triste album) =

Studio album by Officium Triste
- Released: March 2004
- Recorded: February 2004
- Genre: Death-doom, doom metal
- Length: 42:01
- Label: Displeased Records

Officium Triste chronology
The Pathway (2001)	Reason (2004)	Giving Yourself Away (2007)

Reason is the third album by Officium Triste, released in 2004 by Displeased Records.

== Track listing ==
1. "In Pouring Rain" – 5:42
2. "The Silent Witness" – 8:43
3. "This Inner Twist" – 8:18
4. "The Sun Doesn't Shine Anymore" – 10:35
5. "A Flower in Decay" – 8:43

== Personnel ==
- Pim Blankenstein – vocals
- Johan Kwakernaak – rhythm guitar
- Martin Kwakernaak – drums, keyboards
- Gerard de Jong – lead guitar
- Lawrence Meyer – bass guitar
