= On the Horizon =

On the Horizon may refer to:

== Books ==
- On the Horizon, essay by Mongane Wally Serote 1990

== Film and television ==
- On the Horizon, 2015 film featuring Jessica Morris and Kristen Kerr
- On the Horizon, 2026, the series premiere of Avatar: Seven Havens

== Music ==
- On the Horizon (album)

=== Songs ===
- On the Horizon (Ben E. King song) composed by Jerry Leiber / Mike Stoller from Don't Play That Song! 1962
- On the Horizon (Melanie C song) composed by Gregg Alexander / Melanie Jayne Chisholm / Rick Nowels
