= The Pathway (album) =

Studio album by Officium Triste
- Released: May 2001
- Recorded: April 2001
- Genre: Death metal, doom metal
- Length: 41:59
- Label: Displeased Records

Officium Triste chronology
Ne Vivam (1997)	The Pathway (2001)	Reason (2004)

The Pathway is the second album by Officium Triste, released on Displeased Records in 2001. It was remastered and re-released with five additional tracks on October 28, 2007.

== Track listing ==
No.	Title	Length
1.	"Roses on My Grave"	6:35
2.	"Pathway (Of Broken Glass)"	6:17
3.	"Foul Play"	4:43
4.	"Camouflage"	4:27
5.	"Divinity"	6:31
6.	"Deep Down"	7:27
7.	"This Is Goodbye"	5:56
Total length:		41:56

== Personnel ==
- Pim Blankenstein – vocals
- Johan Kwakernaak – rhythm guitar
- Martin Kwakernaak – drums, keyboards
- Gerard de Jong – lead guitar
- Lawrence Meyer – bass guitar
