= Tipo =

Tipo may refer to:

== Entertainment and media ==
- Rico Tipo, an Argentine weekly comic magazine
- Tipo Grupė, a Lithuanian musical group

== People ==
- Maria Tipo, an Italian pianist
- Mu Tipo, a Chinese Northern Qi dynasty official

== Places ==
- Pala Tipo, a lake in India
- Tipo-Tipo, a municipality in the Philippines

== Science and technology ==
- Tipo (or tipollo), a local name for Minthostachys mollis
- Sony Xperia tipo, an Android smartphone
- Tipodex, a medication that decreases stomach acid production

== Vehicles ==
- Fiat Tipo (Type 160), a compact car
- Fiat Tipo (2015), a compact family car

== Other uses ==
- Battle of Tipo-Tipo, a 2016 battle against insurgents in the Philippines
- Scandinavian Tipo Trophy, a Finnish Open golf tournament
- Taiwan Intellectual Property Office (TIPO), an office of Taiwan

== See also ==
- Type
