= His Infernal Majesty =

His Infernal Majesty may refer to:

- Satan
- HIM (Finnish band), a Finnish metal band
- Infernäl Mäjesty, a Canadian metal band
- Him (The Powerpuff Girls), a cartoon villain

== See also ==
- Their Satanic Majesties Request
