= Mors Viri =

Studio album by Officium Triste
- Released: 18 March 2013
- Recorded: 2011–2012
- Studio: El Pato Studio
- Genre: Death-doom, doom metal
- Length: 47:35
- Label: Hammerheart Records
- Producer: Ronnie Björnström

Officium Triste chronology
| Giving Yourself Away (2007) | Mors Viri (2013) | The Death of Gaia (2019) |

Professional ratings
Review scores
| Source | Rating |
|---|---|
| Metal Storm | 8.5/10 |
| Metal Temple | 9/10 |

Mors Viri is the fifth album by Officium Triste, released in 2013 by Hammerheart Records.

== Track listing ==
1. "Your Fall from Grace" – 7:15
2. "Burning All Boats and Bridges" – 6:03
3. "Your Heaven, My Underworld" – 5:36
4. "Interludium" – 1:37
5. "To the Gallows" – 6:58
6. "The Wounded and the Dying" – 6:35
7. "One with the Sea (Part II)" – 3:23
8. "Like Atlas" – 10:08

== Personnel ==
- Pim Blankenstein – vocals
- Bram Bijlhout – rhythm guitar
- Martin Kwakernaak – keyboards
- Niels Jordaan – drums
- Gerard de Jong – lead guitar
- Lawrence Meyer – bass guitar
