= Type =

Type may refer to:

== Computing ==
- Typing, inputting text using a keyboard
- Data type, collection of values with shared operations and representation
  - See also: type safety and type system
- File type, format of contents of a computer file
- Unix file types, such as regular, directory, symbolic link, and specials
- TYPE (DOS command), to display contents of a file
- Type (Unix command), to display information about a command

== Mathematics ==
- Type (model theory), an object that describes how elements in a mathematical structure might behave
- Type, the subject of type theory
  - Type, proposition or set in intuitionistic type theory
- Type, a numeric property of an entire function with positive finite order
  - Exponential type

== Biology ==
- Type (biology), which fixes a scientific name to a taxon
- Dog type, categorization by use or function of domestic dogs

== Lettering ==
- A font style, e.g., "italic type"
- Movable type, in letterpress printing
- Sort (typesetting), in letterpress printing
- Typeface, the overall design of lettering used in a collection of related fonts

== Sociology ==
- Ideal type
- Normal type
- Typification

== Other uses ==
- Type (acting), a way of characterizing an actor by the sort of role they are well-suited for or fit into easily, or by their performance style
- Type, a relation in typology in Christian theology and biblical exegesis
- "Type" (song), a 1990 single by Living Colour
- Type (designation), a model numbering system used for vehicles or military equipment
- Type of aircraft — see type certificate and type rating
- Types of weapon systems overseen by U.S. Navy type commands
- Type of Constans, a 648 edict issued by Byzantine Emperor Constans II
- The former of type–token distinction in logic, linguistics, and computer programming

== See also ==
- Typology (disambiguation), the study of types
- Tipo (disambiguation)
- Categorization
- Kind (disambiguation)
