= Schizophonic =

Schizophonic may refer to:

- Schizophonic (band)
- "Schizophonic", a 1994 song by The Wildhearts from the album Fishing for Luckies
- Schizophonic (Robben Ford album)
- Schizophonic (Nuno Bettencourt album)
- Schizophonic (Geri Halliwell album)
- Schizophonic (Us3 album)
- Schizophonic!, an album by Combustible Edison
