= Unlord =

Dutch black metal band

- Origin: Netherlands
- Genres: Black metal
- Years active: 1989–2002
- Labels: Displeased Records
- Past members: Toep "Stabath" Duin; Marco "Thorgrim" Westenbrink; Dennis "Gor Gho Phon" Jak; Yhe; Manoloxx; Xzerberus Xzyphiluss

Unlord was a Dutch black metal band, formed in 1989. They released three studio albums before disbanding.

== History ==
Unlord originally recorded a number of demo tapes, which were only intended as practice and reference tapes by the band members. The band released their first studio album, Schwarzwald, through Displeased Records on 17 November 1997. Their second studio album, Gladiator, was released in 2000. Their third and final studio album, Lord of Beneath, was released in 2002, featuring cover art by Joe Petagno, who has also created artwork for albums by Motörhead and Sweet.

== Discography ==
Studio albums

- Schwarzwald (1997)
- Gladiator (2000)
- Lord of Beneath (2002)
