= The Death of Gaia =

Studio album by Officium Triste
- Released: 13 December 2019
- Recorded: 2017–2018
- Studio: El Pato Studio
- Genre: Death-doom, doom metal
- Length: 56:02
- Label: Transcending Obscurity Records

Officium Triste chronology
Mors Viri (2013)	The Death of Gaia (2019)	Hortus Venenum (2024)

Professional ratings
Review scores
Source	Rating
Metal Storm	9/10
Metal Temple	9/10
Metal Utopia	7/10

The Death of Gaia is the sixth album by Officium Triste, released in 2019 by Transcending Obscurity Records.

== Track listing ==
1. "The End Is Nigh" – 7:24
2. "World in Flames" – 6:09
3. "Shackles" – 7:48
4. "A House in a Field in the Eye of the Storm" – 2:24
5. "The Guilt" – 7:42
6. "Just Smoke and Mirrors" – 6:56
7. "Like a Flower in the Desert" – 7:19
8. "Losing Ground" – 10:20

== Personnel ==
- Pim Blankenstein – vocals
- William van Dijk – rhythm guitar
- Martin Kwakernaak – keyboards
- Niels Jordaan – drums
- Gerard de Jong – lead guitar
- Theo Plaisier – bass guitar
