= Ne Vivam =

Studio album by Officium Triste
- Released: February 1997
- Recorded: December 1996
- Genre: Melodic death metal, doom metal
- Length: 51:22
- Label: Teutonic Existence
- Producer: Hans Pieters and Officium Triste

Officium Triste chronology
Ne Vivam (1997)	The Pathway (2001)

Ne Vivam is the debut album by the Dutch doom metal band Officium Triste. It was released in 1997 by Teutonic Existence.

== Track listing ==
1. "Frozen Tears" – 6:07
2. "Lonesome" – 7:23
3. "A Journey through Lowlands Green" – 5:13
4. "One with the Sea" – 9:23
5. "Dreams of Sorrow" – 5:33
6. "Stardust" – 5:05
7. "Psyche Nullification" – 8:04
8. "The Happy Forest" – 4:32
