= The Eclectic Sounds of a City Painted Black and White =

Studio album by Bless the Fallen
- Released: May 8, 2007
- Studio: No Noise Studio, Highland Park, New York
- Genre: Metalcore; screamo; post-hardcore
- Length: 46:00
- Label: Crash Music Inc.
- Producer: Dean Reed

Bless the Fallen chronology
So Dark the Crown of Man (2006)	The Eclectic Sounds of a City Painted Black and White (2007)

Professional ratings
Review scores
Source	Rating
AllMusic	2.5/5 stars
Exclaim!	Mixed

The Eclectic Sounds of a City Painted Black and White is the only studio album by American metal band Bless the Fallen. A year after the album's release the band changed their name to the Silence and the Serenity.

== Track listing ==
All lyrics are written by Michael Fraleigh, except where noted; all music is composed by Bless the Fallen.

No.	Title	Lyrics	Length
1.	"Welcome to the City"	Kyle "Majik" Jackson	2:57
2.	"A Modern Masterpiece of Horror"	Fraleigh, Daniel Sheehan	5:22
3.	"Stepping Away from Defeat"		4:21
4.	"In Search of Words"	Sheehan	4:55
5.	"Eclectic Sounds" (instrumental)		3:30
6.	"The Fine Art of Pretending"		6:26
7.	"To Be Evil"		3:51
8.	"Grey and Everything in Between"		3:54
9.	"The Final March"		5:17
10.	"Everything Under the Sun"	Jackson	5:27
Total length:			46:00

== Personnel ==
- Michael Fraleigh – lead vocals
- Kyle "Majik" Jackson – guitar, backing vocals
- Kyle Behnken – guitar
- Daniel DeFonce – guitar
- Nick Privitera – bass
- Phil Bartsch – drums
