= Üçnoktabir =

- Origin: Istanbul, Turkey
- Genres: Rock,
- Years active: 2002–2009
- Labels: İd İletişim Müzik
- Members: Melis Danişmend (vocals); Barış Ertunç (guitar); Cenk Turanlı (bass); Mehmet Demirdelen (drums)
- Website: ucnoktabir.com

Üçnoktabir ("Three Point One"), founded as Spitney Beers, was a Turkish rock band formed in 2002. The band's members were Melis Danişmend (vocal), Barış Ertunç (guitar), Cenk Turanlı (bass) and Mehmet Demirdelen (drums).

== Band history ==
The band began by playing covers at Mojo Bar in Beyoğlu. They performed as an opening act for Pink in 2004. They completed a demo in 2005 and started working on their first album. They provided the song Dediler Ki (They said) for Serdar Akar's film Barda (At the Bar). A little while later, they released their album Sabaha Karşı (Against the Dawn) containing 9 songs. including hits Bahçe (The Garden), Hırsız (Thief), Ölmeden Ünlü Olsam (If I become famous before I die) and Değişmem (I will not change). The band was dissolved in April 2009. Vokalist Melis Danişmend is now a solo artist

== Discography ==
- Dediler Ki (Barda soundtrack)
- Sabaha Karşı
