= Altar (Dutch band) =

Dutch death metal band

- Origin: Coevorden/Hardenberg, Netherlands
- Genre: Death metal
- Years active: 1992–2001
- Label: Displeased Records
- Members: Marcel van Haaff; Nils Vos; Marco Arends; Edwin Kelder

Altar was a Dutch death metal band. The band's songs explore antireligion and anti-establishment themes. AllMusic stated that the band's later output is more mature and refined than their early career efforts such as their debut Youth Against Christ. The site described their style as exhibiting "uncompromising brutality".

== History ==
The band started in the early 1990s under various names, including Manticore and Anubis, in the town of Hardenberg. Eventually it settled on Altar. In 1992, it released its only demo, which landed it at Displeased Records. The band played Dynamo Open Air in 1996. After five full-lengths the band split up in 2001. From time to time, the classic line-up reunites to play a limited number of shows under the name Altar-native.

== Discography ==
- ...And God Created Satan to Blame for His Mistakes (Demo, 1992)
- Youth Against Christ (1994)
- Ego Art (1996)
- Provoke (1998)
- In the Name of the Father (1999)
- Until Heaven Forbids (EP, 2000)
- Red Harvest (2001)
- Altar (Demo, 2007)

== Band members ==
=== Current line-up ===
- Marcel van Haaff - guitar
- Edwin Kelder - vocals
- Nils Vos - bass
- Marco Arends - drums

=== Former members ===
- Marcel Verdurmen - guitar
- Richard Ludwig - guitar
- Michel Coppens - vocals
- Andre Hemel - bass
- Frank Schilperoort - drums
- Sjoerd Visch - drums
- Bert Huisjes - guitar
- Marco de Groot - drums
