= Baroeg =

Music venue in the Netherlands

Coordinates: 51°52′36″N 4°31′08″E

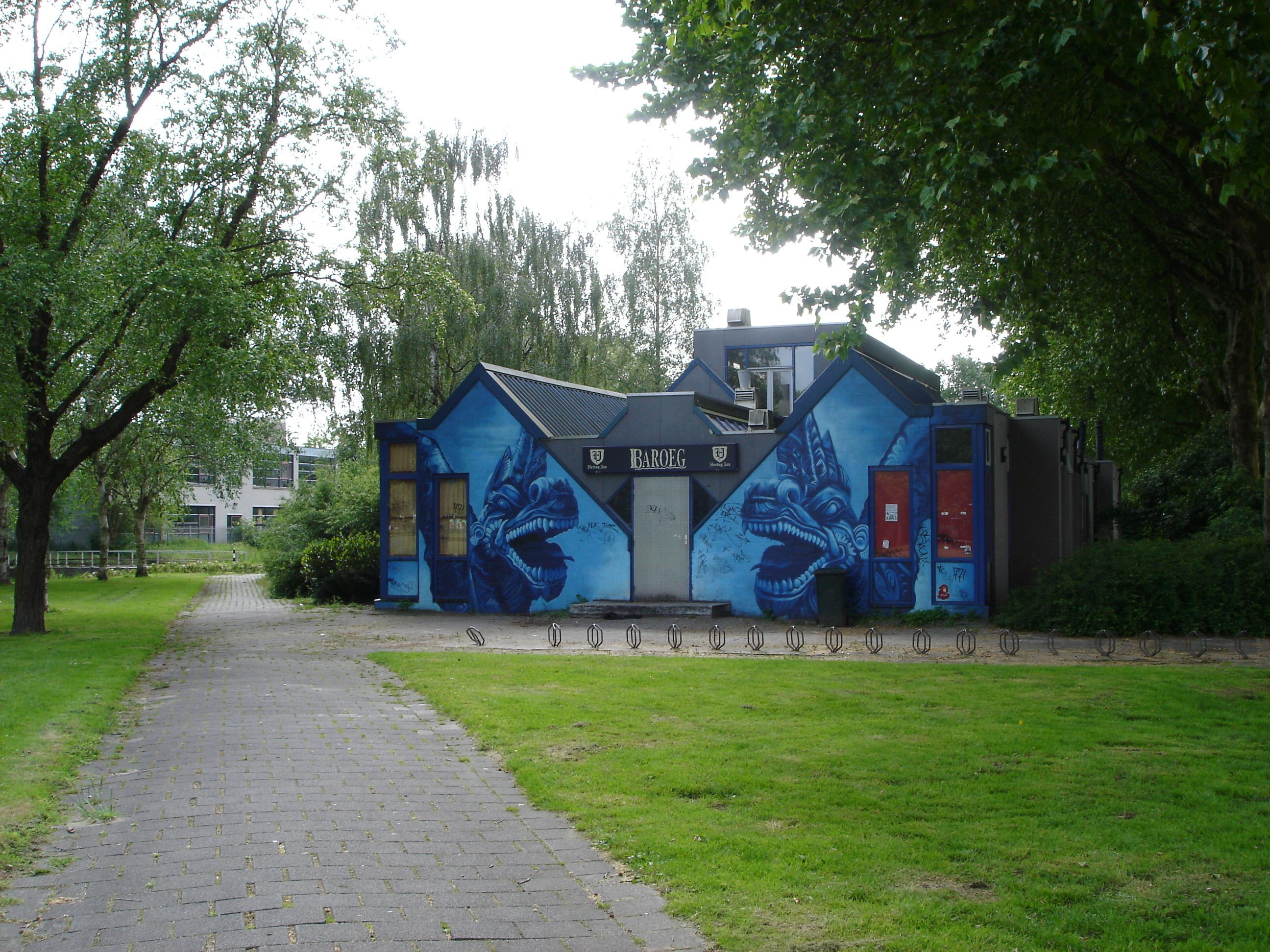
Baroeg in 2007

Baroeg is a music venue in Rotterdam. Baroeg self-describes itself as a 'subcultural pop venue' and hosts alternative modern music events and concerts. The club has been located in the Rotterdam neighbourhood Lombardijen, in the Spinozapark on the Spinozaweg (the club takes its name from the given name of Baruch Spinoza, as pronounced in Dutch).

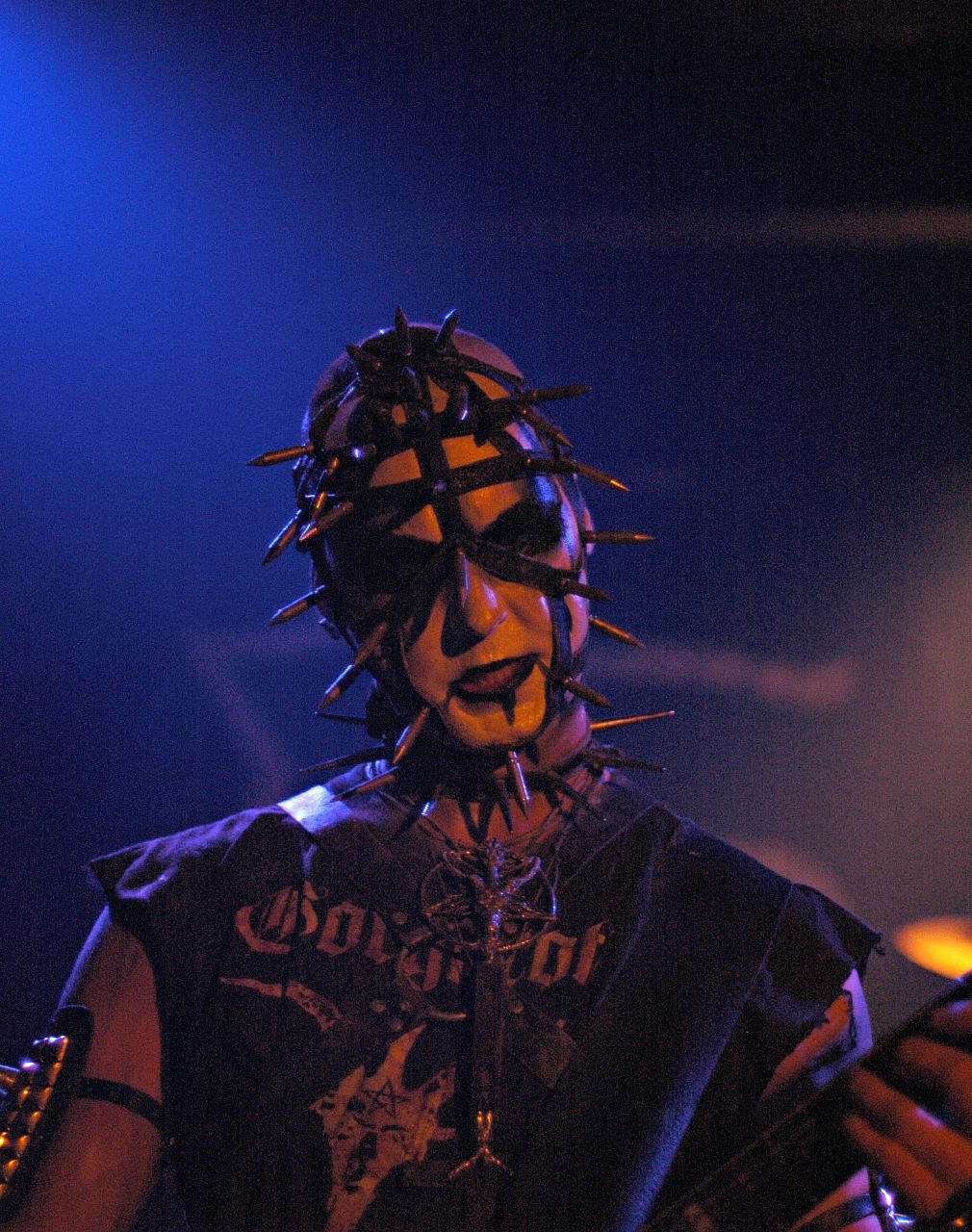
Enzifer, the guitarist of Urgehal during a gig in Baroeg (2007)

Inside Baroeg there are a bar and a concert hall with podium where bands perform metal, punk, hardcore and other styles.

Baroeg also hosts dance nights. A well-known dance event is the monthly Downward Spiral (electronic body music, gothic rock and more). Other dance nights vary from cybergothic to wave to drum and bass.

In the past bands such as Tröckener Kecks, Claw Boys Claw, Cradle of Filth and Within Temptation (in 1998) performed at Baroeg though with a capacity of 400 visitors it is not feasible to host such famous bands anymore.

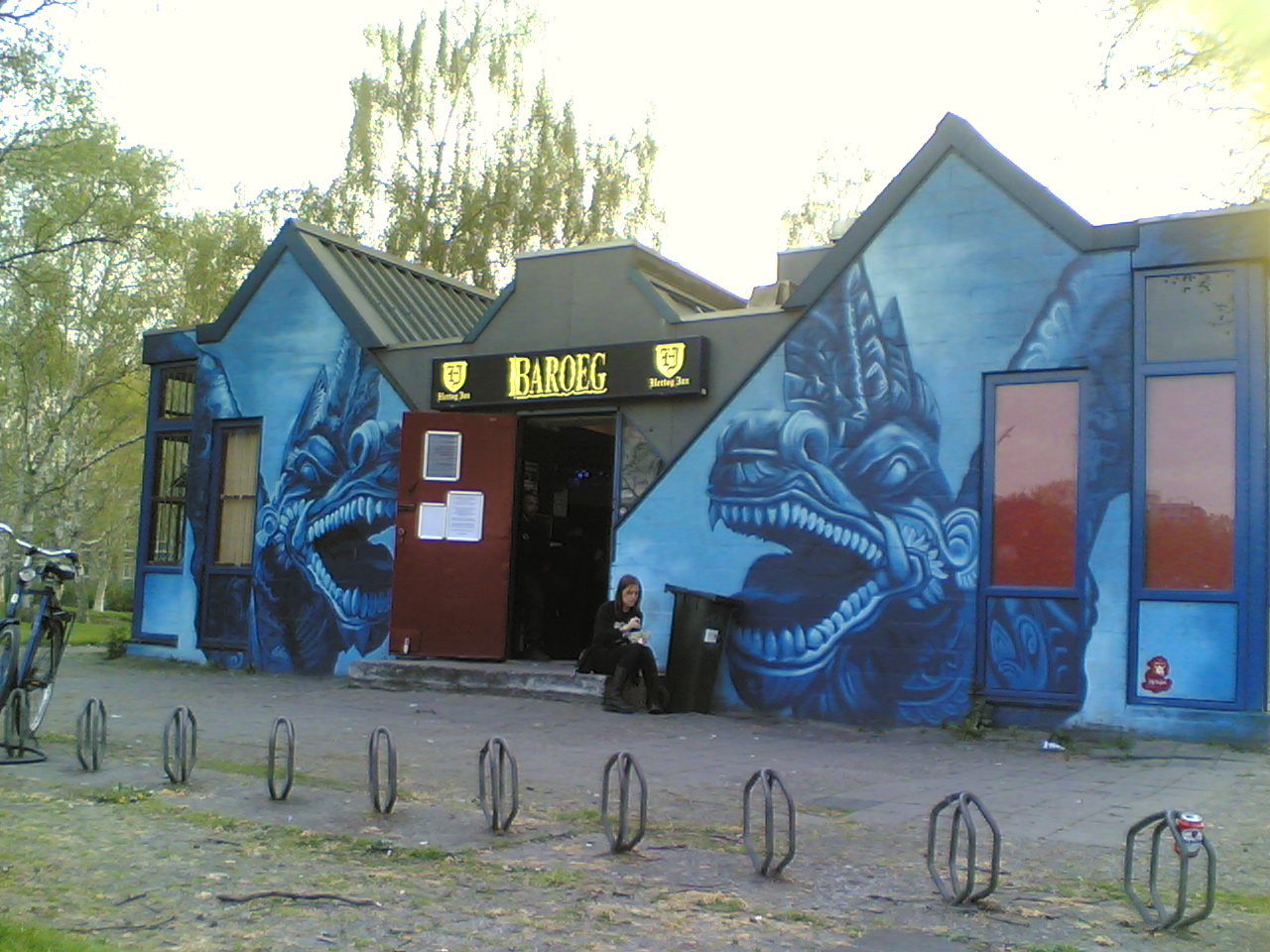
Baroeg in 2008

Since the 25 year anniversary Baroeg twice-annually organized the Baroeg Open Air festival outside the Baroeg in the park.

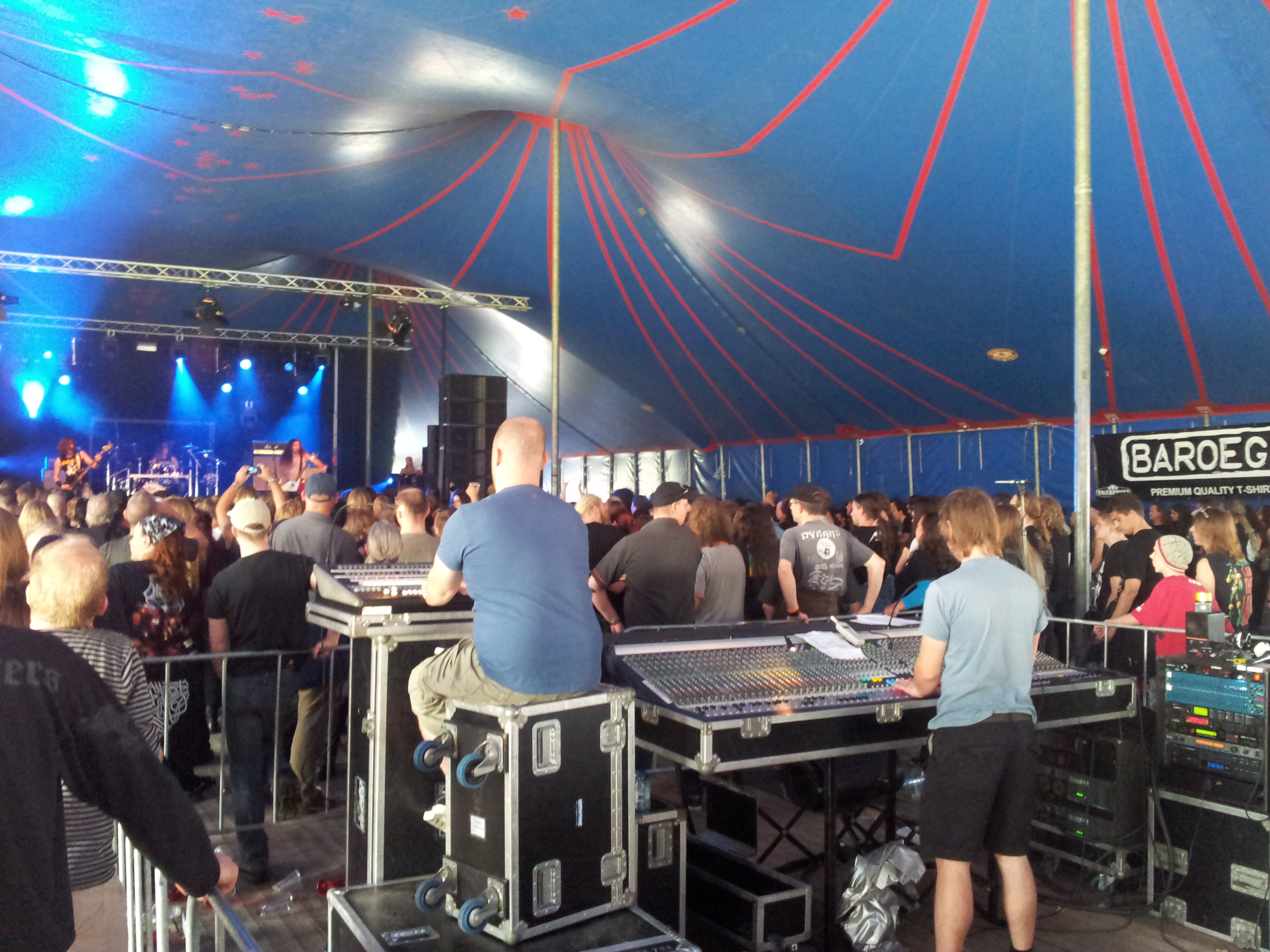
Vanderbuyst at Baroeg Open Air 2011

Since 2011 Baroeg Open Air is held annually in the Zuiderpark, near to Ahoy.

In 2007 Baroeg was temporarily closed down after Michal Karlowicz, a 24-year-old Polish man, died after being hit with a bar stool. Two suspects were soon apprehended and were later convicted to jail terms of five and six years. Mayor Ivo Opstelten closed Baroeg for three months despite protest in the city council by the Socialist Party and Livable Rotterdam The protests fell on deaf ears and Baroeg was closed for the three-month duration.

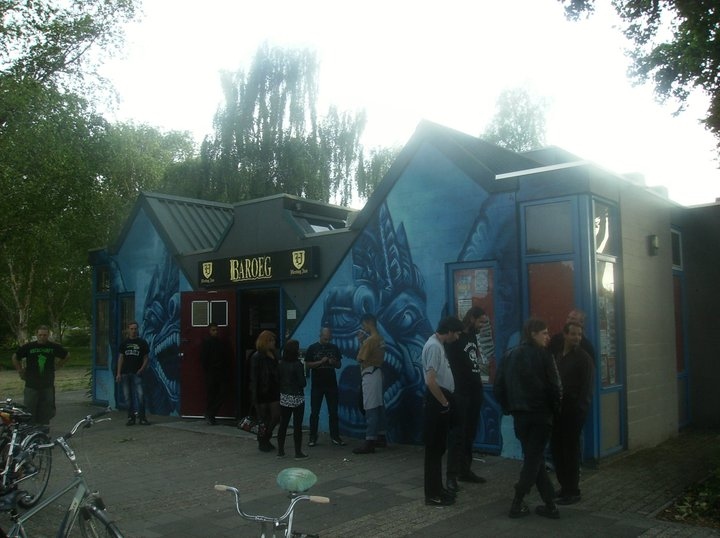
A crowd gathers outside of Baroeg during a Mucky Pup show on June 5, 2011.
