= Infernäl Mäjesty =

Canadian thrash metal band

- The band in 1987

Background information
- Origin: Vancouver, British Columbia, Canada
- Genres: Thrash metal, Death metal, first-wave black metal
- Years active: 1986–present
- Labels: Roadrunner, Displeased
- Members: Chris Bailey; Kenny Hallman; Steve Terror; Eric Dubreuil
- Past members: Brian Langley; Bob Quelch; Kevin Harrison; Psycopath; Chay McMullen; Rick Nemes; Don Kuntz

Infernäl Mäjesty is a Canadian thrash metal band formed in 1986 and based in Vancouver. They are known for their debut album, None Shall Defy, released in 1987. The 1998 re-issue by Displeased Records inspired them to reunite and record a new album, followed by a European tour. They remain active.

In 2018, they announced production and cover art for the forthcoming album Secrets, along with a single from the record due in 2019. It remains unreleased.

== Band members ==
=== Current ===
- Chris Bailey – vocals
- Kenny Hallman – guitars
- Steve Terror – guitars
- Eric Dubreuil – bass
- Kiel Wilson – drums

=== Former ===
- Brian Langley – vocals
- Bob Quelch – bass
- Kevin Harrison – drums
- Psycopath – bass
- Chay McMullen – bass
- Rick Nemes – drums
- Kris DeBoer – drums
- Greg Cavanagh – vocals
- Don "Vince" Kuntz – vocals (died 2001)
- Kiel Wilson – bass

== Discography ==
=== Full-length ===
- None Shall Defy (1987)
- Unholier Than Thou (1998)
- One who Points to Death (2004)
- No God (2017)

=== Other ===
- Nigresent Dissolution (1988)
- Chaos in Copenhagen (live, 1999)
- Demon God EP (2007)
