= Die Kur =

- Die Kur Araneae Logo as it appears on The Fall of The Empire album cover

Background information
- Origin: London, England
- Genres: Industrial metal, avant-garde, musique concrète
- Years active: 1995–present
- Labels: NMTCG Records, AWAL, Plastic Head

Die Kur is an industrial metal band from London, England. Formed in 1999 but with origins from 1995, the band has released five albums: From Dark (Renaissance of Evil) (2005), The Fall of The Empire (2008), ERA (Formicidae) (2011), the fourth double album Manifesto, released on 20 March 2015 comprising part 1, Modern Society Manifesto, and part 2, Songs of Freedom, and in 2021 they released "Regime: The Unsettling March to the World Domination". The band is actively performing concerts

== History ==
=== Origins (1995–2000) ===
The band started as a duo project with Ays Kura and Tony D. writing a few music compositions and some electronic tunes. They performed the first concerts under the name of The Out Mind Zone in 1995. Continuous research and experiments with sound brought them to add guitars to their compositions and guitar player Max first, then bass player Joseph joined the project. The name then changed to The Care. The newly born band slowly evolved from an electronic sound to a more punk/rock sound and a first definitive band was formed with a lineup consisting of two guitars, bass, drums, keyboards and voice. Their live attitude along with composition not common for local rock metal band confined them into a world on their own.

=== Early days (1999–2003) ===
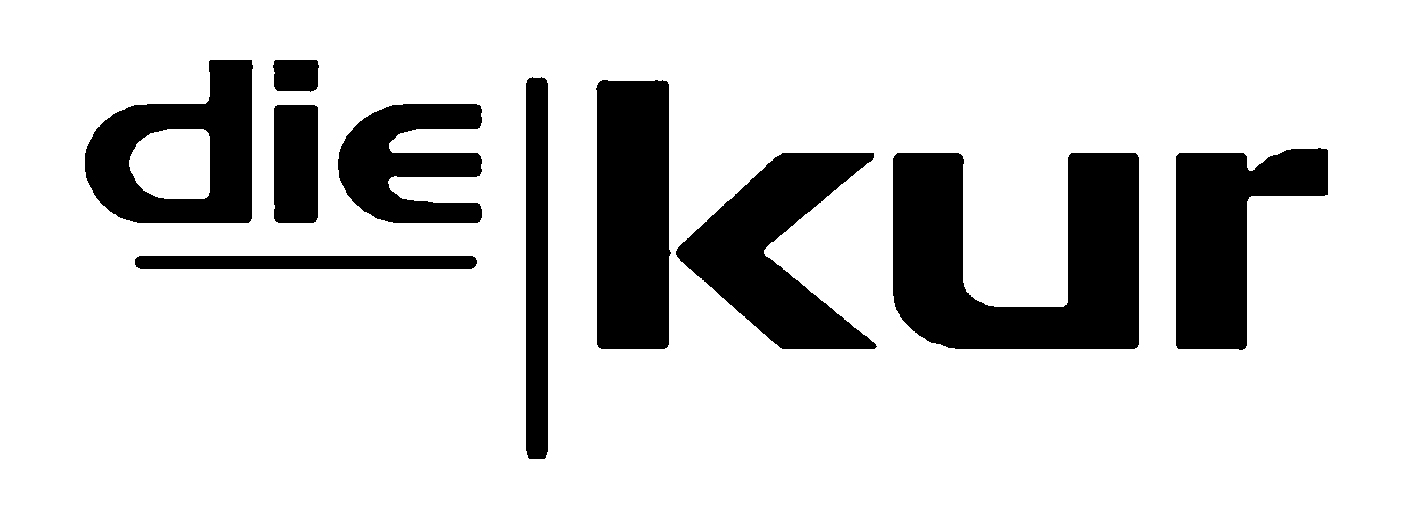
Die Kur official logo

In 1999 the name was changed from The Care to Die Kur / Die Sorge then to the definitive Die Kur. The name was taken from a German book after a rave party in Rome. Kura chose the words and liked the double meaning as the name be read in German or pronounced in English. Sometimes the name was used with the English article "the" making it "The Die Kur" to accentuate this. Later the article was dropped leaving only Die Kur remaining.

At this stage Kura started working in a recording studio with the agreement he could use the studio in the after work hours to record his own material. The first recording coming was "The Night before The back of the vampire" an experiment in using all the new studio equipment as well as trying to adjust his composition skills to a professional recording studio. With a new album already written for The Care, Tony and Kura decided to drop The Care recordings and dedicate only to Die Kur. The first night in studio together they recorded "The Face of Evil", that, in fact, will become the first single for Die Kur.

Followed by "Other but Reality", which featured Tony playing drums along synths and a sample taken from a German choir multitrack tape Kura was using to exercise with his mixing skills. Radio Detroit industrial broadcast the song and few more songs were recorded in the studio, including "David's Dream" and "4 (Pythagoras' Theme)". Although the full album Stardust from a Cup of Tea was recorded, the release was dropped. Instead they took the recording and made a remix of mostly the songs. "Kur•Fur•Stan•Damm" (sometimes spelled as "Kur•For•Stan•Damn") was born. This album as well as the next Biomech Butterfly never where officially released, although a few singles were taken into consideration and handled to local DJs and radios. Only one live appearance happened during this period and the name used by the promotion was still The Care/Die Kur and mostly of the time was consumed in edit and changing songs as well as continuous problems within the band. Alberto then approached the band and his guitar sound gave a new wider vision to Die Kur, recording "Zero", "Suicide ^ Machine", "Attempt to Die". With him joining the band, they had the first live concert under the name of Die Kur at the Scorpion Club.

=== From Dark (Renaissance of Evil) – (2003–2007) ===
Again although many tunes were ready they never concluded in a full album. This situation was frustrating for the band itself which was overproducing music but never releasing. Then Kura started to compose something new. The new relocation in London (UK), alongside the new experience made him write three of the most important Die Kur songs: "Hell Machine" which will be the first From Dark (Renaissance of Evil) single and in the following two days "17 Seconds of Pure Pleasure", and "Nihilist Act". The following attempts of recording the songs were between many difficulties and eventually Kura met drummer Jenya, who recorded all drums for "From Dark (Renaissance of Evil)" as well as becoming live drummer. As a trio they performed the first live concert in London at the rock club Infinity and was a total success, distinguishing themselves as a very chaotic and energetic live band.

The album was very well received but considered possibly only for a niche who loves their style of music. Following the release of "From Dark (Renaissance of Evil)" the band again entered in a hard situations when Jenya had to leave the UK while they were writing down the ideas of what would later become their second album. Nearly three years passed without a live show and Alberto and Kura in the meantime were recording the album "The Fall of The Empire" as well as Kura was composing and recording a new industrial soundtrack for the movie Fritz Lang's Metropolis, which featured "The Chemistry Steamer" and "Hell Machine" from "From Dark (Renaissance of Evil)" as well as remix of "The Entertainment System" and "Evolution/Revolution" a single from the then upcoming"The Fall of The Empire". Only when Brendan joined the band as drummer they started again to perform live concert.

=== The Fall of The Empire – Propaganda Tour (2008–2010) ===
The Fall of The Empire is the second studio album from Die Kur and includes many earlier recordings and ideas. It was much anticipated but fans had to wait long before they could actually listen to it. In 2009 the album saw the final mixdown and was released first on vinyl and digital release, then in 2010 in CD format under NMTCG label. The first single "Saviour of Nothing" has been featured again in the CD cover of Powerplay Magazine, and "The Fall of The Empire (Song)" is featured in Music Fusion compilation. Following "The Fall of The Empire" they released "Era: past and future meet." a song in mp3 format only available for download anticipating the new album. A new series of live concert was already played when drummer Esteban joined the current lineup.

=== ERA (Formicidae) (2011–2012) ===
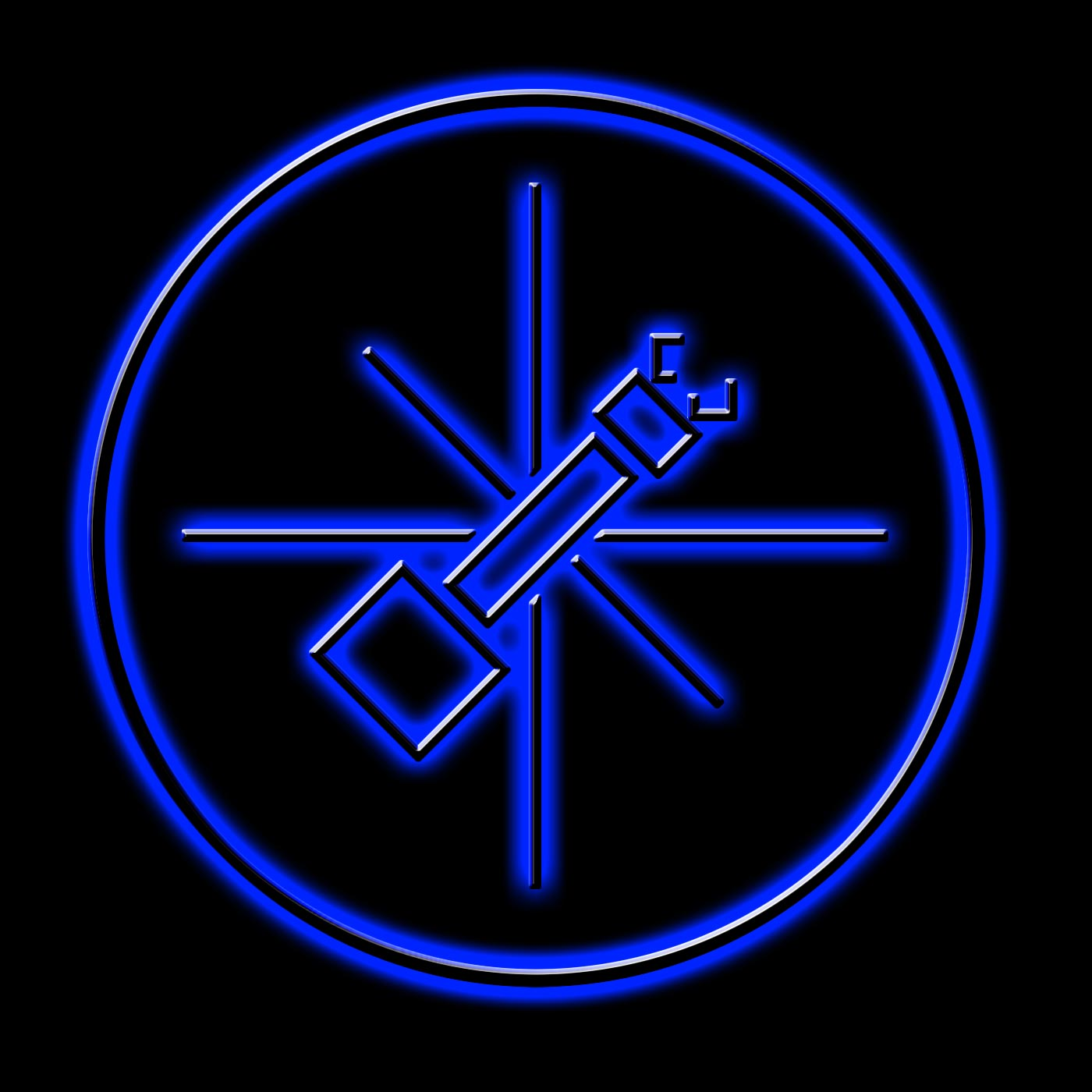
Die Kur's Formicidae logo

On 8 October 2011, during a concert held at the alternative club Reptile in London Die Kur presented a new album entitled ERA (Formicidae) which featured 12 new songs among which a new single "New Era". The Album was well received and considered by some a more cohesive effort.

=== 2012–2014: "The Order of Things to Be" / "It Must Be (Destroyed)" ===
In May 2012 Kura announced in an interview that Die Kur was currently working on a new album still unscheduled for release. In October 2013 the band revealed an EP with songs that are currently performed live, although without title on the cover/CD the album was entitled Manifesto EP although the EP was later dropped by the label due to the face that only 3 of the 4 songs finished on the CD. The song "It Must Be (Destroyed)" has been featured on Terrorizer Magazine Cover CD while "The Order of Things to Be" has become a free download from Die Kur Official Website. The EP anticipated what will be Die Kur fourth album.

=== Manifesto / "Beneath the Waves" (2015–2017) ===
Manifesto, Die Kur's fourth double album was released on 20 March 2015 with a live concert. Composed of two parts "Modern Society Manifesto" and "Songs of Freedom", the release features 32 songs and has been critically acclaimed by press and alternative radios as a great release for the band. With the first single to be extracted being "Conceptualising the War Machine". The album was preceded by an EP two years before, with two main singles "It Must Be (Destroyed)" and "The Order of Things to Be" which will be included in the final release, alongside the unique track "Circle Thinking" which won't be included in the final version of the album. The album is characterised by many elements of avant-garde music together with metal and industrial, and Kura, in an interview, declared he saw the album as a form of composition of musique concrète.

2017 saw the release of "Beneath The Waves", a completely new single over 12 minutes long, the song has been praised for his composition and evolution and gained popularity thanks to numerous independent radio plays. The song was released as a free download and was available in physical format on Record Store Day on 22 April worldwide.

=== All the Way Down to a New Regime (EP) (2018) ===
In 2018, strong from a consolidated line up consisting of Ays Kura, Amadeus R, Tony Nash, Nicholas McBrain, Takatsuna Mukai and Ivan Lattanzi, Die Kur released All the Way Down to a New Regime, an EP composed by four new songs. The release was supported by an independent European tour and unexpectedly a video release for the first song, "The Legacy of the Fox". Its lyrics touch the contemporary situation of many venues being shut down, making particular reference to The Intrepid Fox in London.

=== Regime: The Unsettling March to the World Domination (2021) ===
On 30 January 2021, during an online event, Die Kur released their fifth studio album entitled Regime: The Unsettling March to the World Domination as a continuous series of conceptual videos. The album further down pushes their experimental style into new unexpected territory, also thanks to the inclusion of few avant-guarde ambient tracks recorded as a soundtrack for an experimental theatre show.

=== Lineup ===
- Ays Kura (voice, synthesizers, theremin, guitar, production)
- Amadeus R (guitar)
- Tony Nash (guitar)
- Takatsuna Mukai (violin)
- Nicholas McBrain (drums)
- Vanir Jr Rodriguez (bass)

== Discography ==
=== Studio albums ===
- From Dark (Renaissance of Evil) (2006)
- The Fall of The Empire (2009)
- ERA (Formicidae) (2011)
- Manifesto (2015)
- Regime: The Unsettling March to the World Domination (2021)

=== Singles ===
- "Hell Machine" (2003)
- "Nihilist Act" (2003)
- "17 Seconds of Pure Pleasure" (2004)
- "A Postcard from Infers" (2004)
- "The Renaissance of Evil" (2005)
- "Diamond Disease" (2006)
- "The Chemistry Steamer" (2006)
- "Under the Empire of the Sun to Follow" (2007)
- "Empyrean Hymn" (2008)
- "Evolution/Revolution" (2008)
- "Attack Pheromone" (2010)
- "Hymenoptera" (2011)
- "New Era" (2011)
- "Forging Araneae" (2012)
- "It Must Be (Destroyed)" (2013)
- "The Order of Things to be" (2013)
- "With Us / Against Us" (2014)
- "Conceptualising the War Machine" (2015)
- "The Leader of Zeros" (2015)
- "Servants of the Netherworld" (2016)
- "Beneath the Waves" (2017)
- "The Legacy of the" Fox (2018)
- "The Eye That Sees The World" (2021)

=== EPs ===
- Manifesto EP (2013)
- All the Way Down to a New Regime (2018)

=== Live DVD ===
- "Die Kur 20th Anniversary Show Live at the Dome" (2019)
