= The Silence and the Serenity =

American metal band

- Also known as: Bless the Fallen
- Origin: Poughkeepsie, New York, U.S.
- Genres: Metalcore; deathcore
- Years active: 2005–2008
- Labels: Crash Music Inc.
- Members: Mikey Fraleigh; Nick Privitera; Phil Bartsch; Kyle Behnken; Kyle Jackson

The Silence and the Serenity was a short-lived American metalcore band from Poughkeepsie, New York. They formed in 2005 under the name Bless the Fallen.

After self-releasing their debut EP, So Dark the Crown of Man, they signed a deal with Crash Music Inc., who released their debut full-length album, The Eclectic Sounds of a City Painted Black and White in 2007, described by Allmusic as "a routine screamo/metalcore blend that contains occasional hints of death metal and black metal". Despite calling the recording quality of the album "terrible", Exclaim! described the album as "a fun, nostalgic metal fight".

After months of inactivity, Bartsch and Privitera would go on to form Dead Empires with long-time friend John Bryan. They recorded a 4-song EP entitled "Monuments" that was mastered by current Guns N' Roses guitarist Ron "Bumblefoot" Thal. In the spring of 2012, Dead Empires entered The Isokon studio in Woodstock, New York under the guidance of D. James Goodwin to complete a full-length album entitled "Waiting In Waves". It currently has a release date of August 2012.

In the summer of 2011, drummer Phil Bartsch, and guitarist Kyle Behnken joined the Poughkeepsie Hardcore Ska-Punk band RBNX (The Raddigan Brothers Noise Experience.) The band was signed to bassist and lead vocalist Mike Dietz's record label P.I.F.F. ("Punk Is Fucking Fun") Records, and currently on Patient Zero Records. In the past 15 years the band has released 2 full length records, multiple splits, and has been featured on countless compilation records. They've toured internationally, and are currently touring and releasing new music.

== Members ==
Final lineup

- Mikey Fraleigh – lead vocals
- Nick Privitera – bass guitar
- Phil Bartsch – drums
- Kyle Jackson – guitar, vocals
- Kyle Behnken – guitar

Former members

- Daniel Sheehan – vocals (on So Dark the Crown of Man)
- Kenny – vocals
- Daniel DeFonce – guitar
- Will – guitar

== Discography ==
- So Dark the Crown of Man (2006) (EP)
- The Eclectic Sounds of a City Painted Black and White (2007), Crash Music Inc.
- Demo EP (2008) – as The Silence and the Serenity
