= Arktida =

Russian band

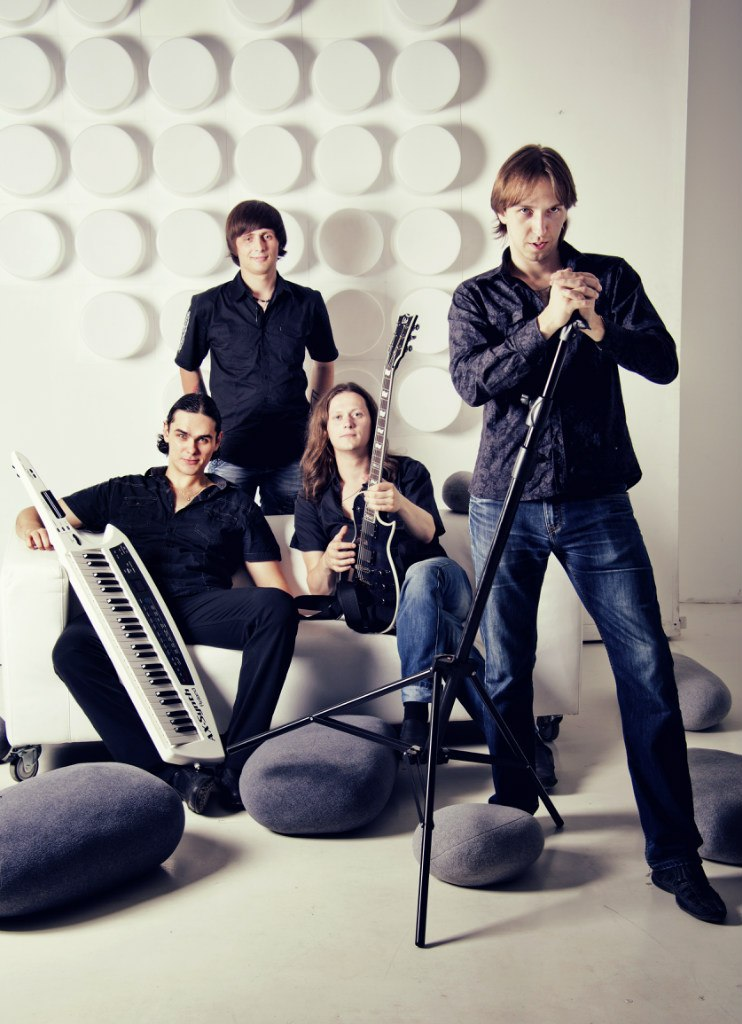
- Arktida's members

Background information
- Origin: Moscow, Russia
- Genres: Power metal, Symphonic metal
- Years active: 2003–present
- Label: Metalism Records
- Members: Dimitry Mashkov; Vasily Smolin; Sergei Lobanov; Vladimir Alyoshkin; Anton Volobrinsky
- Past members: Alexander Prikhodchenko; Alexander Tratsky; Vladimir Lebedev; Denis Boatmen; Alexander Ovchinnikov; Valery Zolotaev; Konstantin Savchenko; Alexei Podgorny; Dmitry Chernikov

Arktida (Cyrillic, Арктида) is a Russian band that was formed in 2003 in Moscow, Russia. Its genre is power metal with influences of symphonic metal.

== History ==
The band was formed on March 2, 2003 in the city of Moscow, Russia under the name of Arkaim. Soon before releasing their first full-length album, they realized their name was not too unique. Because of this, they changed the name of the band to Arktida.

Initially, there were just three members of this band. Alexander Tratsky, who was the drummer, and also the founder of the band, Vladimir Lebedev, the singer and songwriter, and guitarist and composer, Denis Boatmen. On March 2, 2003, the band formed and had their first session together. They all decided to dedicate their music to the genre of power metal. A little later into the band's existence, the bassist and guitarist, Basil Smolin and Alexander Prikhodchenko joined the group. On April 6, with their new line-up, they played their first successful show. Later in the summer of 2003, Dimitry Mashkov joined as the keyboardist and they toured Russia until the beginning of winter. In February 2004, Alexander Prikhodchenko left the group.

The turning point in the group's history happened when Denis Boatmen and Dmitry Mashkov went to study in the city of Moscow. The group had disbanded for a while due to this, but the guitarist and keyboardist urged the rest of the group to reassemble in the nation's capital.

On October 8, 2008, the band released their album On the Horizon under the label of Metalism Records, which consisted of 17 tracks. On April 1, 2011, the band released a second album, Through the Centuries. On December 28 of 2011, it was announced that the group had split up. Denis Boatmen, Valery Zolotaev, Konstantin Savchenko and Alexander Ovchinnikov created their own band called, NickName, and reserved the rights to the songs of the old repertoire.

== The New Composition ==
On April 11, 2012, the group introduced a new structure and a cover of "I'm Alive" by Helloween. On September 3 of that year, the group announced that their new vocalist, Sergey Lobanov, would be unable to perform due to tragic circumstances. He was replaced by Michael Nakhimovic for the time being.

== Style ==
This band is most well known for playing power metal with a mixed element of symphonic metal.

== Members ==
=== Current members ===
- Dmitry Mashkov – keyboards (2003–present)
- Vladimir Alyoshkin – drums (2012–present)
- Sergey Lobanov – vocals (2012–2016, 2016–2018, 2020–present)
- Vasily Koshelev – guitars (2016–2018, 2018–present)

=== Former Members ===
- Vasily Smolin – bass (2003–2006, 2012–2015)
- Alexander Tratsky – drums (2003–2006)
- Alexander Prikhodchenko – guitars (2003–2004)
- Denis Burlakov – guitars (2003–2012)
- Vladimir Lebedev – vocals (2003–2006)
- Valery Zolotayev – bass (2006–2012)
- Alexander Ovchinnikov – drums (2006–2012)
- Konstantin Savchenko – vocals (2006–2012)
- Alexey Podgorny – guitars (2012)
- Dmitry Chernikov – guitars (2012–2013)
- Anton Volobrinsky – guitars (2013–2016)
- Dmitriy Rodina – vocals (2016)
- Sergey Ovchinnikov – bass (2016–2018)
- Sergey Podkosov – vocals (2019–2020)

Timeline

== Discography ==
Studio albums:

- On the Horizon (2008)
- Through the Centuries (2011)
- Remember (2015)
- “Music Of Wind, Earth And Fire” (2023)

EPs:

- You Should Not Cry (2010)
- My Friend (2012)
- Duty and Right (2017)

Demo albums:

- Cry of a Hero (2005)
- Nothing to Lose (2005)
- The Right Strong (2006)

Covers:

- "Nightmare" - Axel Rudi Pell (2005)
- "The Chosen Ones" - Dream Evil (2008)
- "Oh, Frost, Frost" - Russian folk song (2009)
- "Who Are You?" - Aria (2010)
- "Eagleheart" - Stratovarius (2011)
- "I'm Alive" - Helloween (2012)
- "Master" - Master (2013)
- "Spell" - Mavrin (2013)
- "Kickstart My Heart" - Mötley Crüe (2015)

== Websites ==
- Official Website
