= Naujieji Lietuviai =

Musical group

Naujieji Lietuviai (NL) (meaning "New Lithuanians" in Lithuanian) was a musical group in Lithuania. It was established in 2003.

The project consisted of 15 musicians, with core persons being Gintaras Reklaitis (music, texts, vocals) and Egmontas Bžeskas (texts, ideas, vocals, group manager), and Linas Rugienius. It was supported by the girl group 69 Danguje (vocals, choreography).

In 2003 they made their name with the song Pasitusinam!, a parody on the political life in Lithuania.

In 2005 the TV 1 channel declared their song Afigenai to be the most popular song and videoclip of the year. In addition, in 2006 Pravda Magazine, it its annual awards recognized "afigenai" (Note: "Afigenai" is a calque from the Russian colloquial adjective "ofigenny" (офигенный), with the general meaning of "impressive", "stunning", from the colloquial verb офигеть, "become stunned". "Ofigenny" is a minced word to replace the profanity "okhuenny" (охуенный), based on Russian mat.) to be the best neologism of year 2005.

The group garnered their popularity primarily over the internet: radio stations did not play their songs due to the liberal use of obscenities.

In 2006 the group authored two albums, 001 and 002. In 2007 one of them claimed to become gold and one platinum.

In 2007 NL was disbanded amid a dispute, and Egidijus Remeikis and Egmontas Bžeskas, together with entrepreneur Ugnius Kiguolis, created the Tipo Grupė group. (Note: "Tipo Grupe" may be loosely translated as "Kinda Group", where "tipo" is also a calque from Russian slang expression tipa (типа). While tipa literally means "kind of" in Russian, its exaggerated usage is characteristic of the criminal slang of "New Russians")

On the night August 22–23, 1:45am, 2008, two group members, Egidijus Remeikis and Jevgenijus Snytkinas died in car accident in Kaunas. After that Tipo Grupe effectively ceased to exist.

On November 30, 2020, Linas Rugienius, who was with the group since its first year, died following a serious illness. He was 42. On November 11, 2022, Gintaras Reklaitis also died. He was over 50 years old.
