= Schizophonic (band) =

Canadian musical group

Background information
- Also known as: Schizophonic LOVE Symphony
- Origin: Nanaimo, British Columbia, Canada
- Genres: Funk, fusion, progressive rock, jazz rock
- Years active: 2010–present
- Label: Unsigned
- Members: Troy Lucas (2010–); Kristen Mortensen (2010–); Jon Bauer (2010–); Josh Agar (2010–); Carson Fry (2010–); Matthew Taylor (2010–); Andrew Jossa (2010–); Phillip Toutant (2010–); Josh Agar (2011–)

Schizophonic, based in Nanaimo, British Columbia, is a nine-piece band playing a mix of genres from rock, to jazz. Formed in late 2010 by students of Vancouver Island University, the group play mostly original songs, many written by band leader Troy Lucas.

== Onewaystreet ==
In the fall of 2008 Onewaystreet, a band composed of high-school students from the Comox Valley was formed by Lucas. The band went through many changes over the course of the next two years, originally playing swing standards, and eventually moving towards ska and rock, as well as several original compositions. Although many members joined and left the band, Troy Lucas kept a core group of members throughout the band's progression.

The success of the band peaked in June and July 2009 while recording a self-titled album. Onewaystreet was the opener at the Georges P. Vanier Secondary School graduation ceremony in June 2009, with band members from several high-schools playing in tuxedos on stage for a crowd of several thousand.

Following the culmination of the school year, the group played two shows at which they sold more than 50 CDs. One of the shows, at a Courtenay, British Columbia café, saw the crowd packed into the coffee shop for hours as the band played two sets, then an encore.

For the summer and ensuing fall the band dissolved as members went separate ways to school and work. Around Christmas of 2009, most of the members played in a reunion concert at an alumni show at G.P. Vanier. In the following months, Lucas attempted to put together rehearsals and shows with a rehashed version of the band, however with members spread all over Vancouver Island, several attempts failed.

During that time a live album of the café concert was put together, but as the band had dissolved again before it could play a show, the album was never used.

== Schizophonic begins ==
During the spring of 2010, when Onewaystreet was in flux, Troy Lucas and Carson Fry came up with the name Schizophonic LOVE Symphony. If the band had taken off again, that would have been the new moniker. Lucas and Fry also decided "Sons of Osiris" would be the name of the first album, with a planned completion date of June 2010. Graham Christie, a former Onewaystreet member then living in Victoria went so far as to design artwork for the CD case.

Once it was clear that the band in its current state was not going to be a success, forming a new band was put on hold until fall 2010. Once the school year began, Lucas brought together musicians, all from Vancouver Island University in Nanaimo to form the band Schizophonic, now with 'LOVE Symphony' dropped.

Although their repertoire includes some originals from Onewaystreet, Schizophonic shares only two members with the former, Troy Lucas (Flute, Alto Sax, Tenor Sax, Soprano Sax), and Carson Fry (Bass Trombone, Percussion, Backup Vocals). To fill out the rest of the eight-piece band are; Kristen Mortensen (Alto Sax, Tenor Sax); Jon Bauer (Trumpet, Vocals); Matthew Taylor (Guitar); Andrew Jossa (Keyboards, Synths); Phillip Toutant (Drums); Josh Agar (Trumpet).

== Logo Change ==
After several months as a band, the group changed the logo from the original, to a new logo.

== Battle of the Bands ==
A hiatus of more than four months followed the band's last show in April 2011. On 17 September 2011, Schizophonic played in the Battle of the Bands competition hosted by The Cambie, a local bar. They played last out of three bands in the second week of the competition. At the end of the night, after voting was in, it was revealed that they had won, and that they would be progressing on to the second round of the competition.

Original

New

The original, and the new logos of Schizophonic
