= Displeased Records =

Dutch independent record label

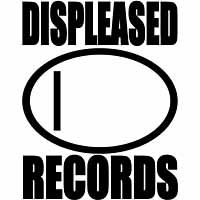
- Company type: Independent record labels
- Industry: Entertainment
- Founded: 1992
- Founder: RW Veltkamp, LJ Eikema
- Defunct: 2018
- Headquarters: Zaandam, Netherlands
- Number of locations: 1
- Area served: World
- Products: Entertainment media
- Owners: RW Veltkamp, LJ Eikema

Displeased Records was a Dutch independent record label, founded by Lars Eikema and Ron Veltkamp. The label had many Dutch and other extreme metal bands on its roster, but has also re-released albums by Agathocles, Cryptopsy, Infernäl Mäjesty, Sadus, Toxik and Whiplash. The label also had a large mail order division called Discorder.com.

== History ==
Displeased Records was founded in 1992 by Lars Eikema and Ron Veltkamp. In the beginning the main focus was to release compilation CDs from unknown/unsigned artists playing all types of heavy metal, like death metal, thrash metal, etc. After a distribution network was set up Displeased Records started releasing studio albums of metal acts like Nembrionic, Altar, Hybernoid and Celestial Season. In the same period a mail order business was erected, in the beginning under the same moniker of the label name, later changed to Dis-order (a combination of DISpleased and mailORDER). Since 2011, the name was changed to Discorder.

From the second half of the 1990s, Displeased Records licensed cult thrash metal albums from Roadrunner Records, from bands like Infernäl Mäjesty, Pestilence, Whiplash, Toxik and Sadus.

A distribution service was present from the beginning, albeit very small. Later on more and more music shops were provided with the metal albums and shirts that were already sold through the mail order.

In April 2018, Displeased Records went bankrupt.

== Artists ==
- Acheron
- Altar
- Bunkur
- Celestial Season
- Consolation
- Cryptopsy
- Dead Head
- Eternal Solstice
- Even Song
- Goat Semen
- Hades
- Hellwitch
- Houwitser
- Hybernoid
- Infinited Hate
- Manegarm
- Nembrionic
- Nocturnal
- Officium Triste
- Sadist
- Sadus
- Striborg
- Toxik
- Unlord
- Vesperian Sorrow
- Whiplash
