= 2000 in heavy metal music =

This is a timeline documenting the events of heavy metal in the year 2000.

== Newly formed bands ==
- 5ive
- A Perfect Murder
- Adagio
- Adema
- Alcest
- Alove for Enemies
- Angelus Apatrida
- Animosity
- The Answer
- Antigama
- Apostasy
- Arsis
- As I Lay Dying
- Beto Vázquez Infinity
- Between the Buried and Me
- Beyond the Embrace
- Blinded Colony (as Stigmata)
- Bucovina
- Byzantine
- Cannae
- Car Bomb
- Circus Maximus
- Crashdïet
- The Darkness
- Deadsoul Tribe
- Deathstars
- Debauchery
- Demon Hunter
- Desperados
- Disarmonia Mundi
- Forever Slave
- From Autumn to Ashes
- Full Blown Chaos
- Hammers of Misfortune
- Hatesphere
- Hurt
- Indukti
- Kiuas
- Last Tribe
- Machinae Supremacy
- Majesty
- Mar de Grises
- Mastodon
- Mgła
- Mirrorthrone
- Mystic Prophecy
- Nachtmystium
- Nightrage
- The Ocean
- Ondskapt
- Otep
- Pagan's Mind
- Pantheist
- Peste Noire
- Place of Skulls
- Planet X
- Poisonblack
- Scars of Tomorrow
- Shaaman
- Seventh Wonder
- Steel Panther
- Swallow the Sun
- Sylosis
- Thunderstone
- Ulcerate
- Ünloco
- The Vision Bleak
- Visions of Atlantis
- Warmen
- Winter Solstice
- Witchcraft

== Reformed bands ==
- Britny Fox
- Living Colour

== Albums ==
=== January ===
Day	Artist	Album
11	Chimaira	This Present Darkness (EP)
11	Kittie	Spit
12	Saturnus	Martyre
17	Sentenced	Crimson
17	Dismember	Hate Campaign
18	Cro-Mags	Revenge
24	Novembre	Classica
25	Primer 55	Introduction to Mayhem
25	Snapcase	Designs for Automotion
31	Macabre	Dahmer
31	Therion	Deggial

=== February ===
Day	Artist	Album
1	Skillet	Invincible
2	Pink Cream 69	Sonic Dynamite
7	Gorgoroth	Incipit Satan
7	Melvins	The Crybaby
7	Haggard	Awaking the Centuries
8	Bloodbath	Breeding Death (EP)
8	Demons & Wizards	Demons & Wizards
8	Soilwork	The Chainheart Machine
21	Misanthrope	Recueil d'Écueils: les Épaves et Autres Oeuvres Interdites (compilation)
22	Goatwhore	The Eclipse of Ages into Black
28	AC/DC	Stiff Upper Lip
28	Stratovarius	Infinite
29	Rollins Band	Get Some -> Go Again
29	Deceased	Supernatural Addiction

=== March ===
Day	Artist	Album
3	Quo Vadis	Day into Night
6	Entombed	Uprising
6	Alchemist	Organasm
7	Alabama Thunderpussy	Constellation
7	Armored Saint	Revelation
7	Disturbed	The Sickness
7	High on Fire	The Art of Self Defense
7	Transport League	Satanic Panic
7	Crowbar	Equilibrium
7	Krisiun	Conquerors of Armageddon
11	Martyr	Warp Zone
13	Old Man's Child	Revelation 666 – The Curse of Damnation
14	Poison	Crack a Smile... and More!
15	Platypus	Ice Cycles
20	Vader	Litany
21	Dio	Magica
21	Morgana Lefay	S.O.S
21	Project 86	Drawing Black Lines
24	Aghora	Aghora
27	Immortal	Damned in Black
27	Pantera	Reinventing the Steel
27	Seven Witches	City of Lost Souls

=== April ===
Day	Artist	Album
3	Isis	Celestial
4	Shadows Fall	Of One Blood
8	Heaven Shall Burn	Asunder
10	One Minute Silence	Buy Now... Saved Later
10	The Hives	Veni Vidi Vicious
10	The Berzerker	The Berzerker
11	Trans-Siberian Orchestra	Beethoven's Last Night
17	Borknagar	Quintessence
17	Decapitated	Winds of Creation
17	QueenAdreena	Taxidermy
18	Black Label Society	Stronger Than Death
18	Nasum	Human 2.0
18	The Chasm	Procession to the Infraworld
21	Anthem	Heavy Metal Anthem
24	After Forever	Prison of Desire
25	Boysetsfire	After the Eulogy
25	Destruction	All Hell Breaks Loose
25	Papa Roach	Infest
25	Racer X	Technical Difficulties (Europe and US versions)
25	Saxon	Burrn! Presents: The Best of Saxon (compilation)
25	Venom	Resurrection
28	Tankard	Kings of Beer

=== May ===
Day	Artist	Album
8	Nightwish	Wishmaster
8	Chthonic	9th Empyrean
9	Glassjaw	Everything You Ever Wanted to Know About Silence
9	Incantation	The Infernal Storm
9	Jag Panzer	Thane to the Throne
13	Trail of Tears	Profoundemonium
15	Motörhead	We Are Motörhead
16	Orange Goblin	The Big Black
17	Belphegor	Necrodaemon Terrorsathan
17	Brujeria	Brujerizmo
19	Mägo de Oz	Finisterra
22	Blaze Bayley	Silicon Messiah
22	Raised Fist	Ignoring the Guidelines
22	Hypocrisy	Into the Abyss
22	Primordial	Spirit the Earth Aflame
23	A Perfect Circle	Mer de Noms
23	King's X	Please Come Home... Mr. Bulbous
23	Pitchshifter	Deviant
23	Discordance Axis	The Inalienable Dreamless
23	King Crimson	The Construkction of Light
23	The Crown	Deathrace King
28	Green Carnation	Journey to the End of the Night
29	Iron Maiden	Brave New World
29	Red Harvest	Cold Dark Matter
30	Ska-P	Planeta Eskoria
30	Ultraspank	Progress

=== June ===
Day	Artist	Album
6	Alice Cooper	Brutal Planet
6	Mayhem	Grand Declaration of War
8	Cave In	Jupiter
13	Poison	Power to the People
13	Stuck Mojo	Declaration of a Headhunter
20	Ayreon	Universal Migrator Part 1: The Dream Sequencer
20	Ayreon	Universal Migrator Part 2: Flight of the Migrator
20	Deftones	White Pony
20	King Diamond	House of God
20	Madball	Hold It Down
20	The Sins of Thy Beloved	Perpetual Desolation
20	Deathspell Omega	Infernal Battles
20	Earth Crisis	Slither
21	Stratovarius	14 Diamonds (compilation)
25	Edguy	The Savage Poetry (re-recording)
26	Devin Townsend	Physicist (album)
26	Metalium	State of Triumph – Chapter Two
26	Sunn O)))	ØØ Void
27	Deicide	Insineratehymn
27	Taproot	Gift
30	The Haunted	Made Me Do It

=== July ===
Day	Artist	Album
3	In Flames	Clayman
4	Killswitch Engage	Killswitch Engage
4	Pig Destroyer	Isis / Pig Destroyer (split EP)
4	Underoath	Cries of the Past
7	Dark Tranquillity	Haven
11	Mötley Crüe	New Tattoo
11	Origin	Origin
18	Darkest Hour	The Mark of the Judas
18	The Union Underground	...An Education in Rebellion
25	Fates Warning	Disconnected
25	Sinergy	To Hell and Back
25	Finger Eleven	The Greyest of Blue Skies
26	Rob Rock	Rage of Creation

=== August ===
Day	Artist	Album
1	Eighteen Visions	Until the Ink Runs Out
8	Halford	Resurrection
8	Scorpions	Moment of Glory (compilation)
14	Raging Speedhorn	Raging Speedhorn
15	Exhumed	Slaughtercult
15	Society's Finest	The Journey...So Far
17	Pro-Pain	Round 6
22	Mudvayne	L.D. 50
22	Hed PE	Broke
28	Rotting Christ	Khronos
29	Paul Di'Anno	Nomad
29	Shuvel	Set It Off

=== September ===
Day	Artist	Album
5	Nile	Black Seeds of Vengeance
5	Nothingface	Violence
8	Seo Taiji	Ultramania
12	At the Drive-In	Relationship of Command
12	Type O Negative	After Dark (live)
12	Cold	13 Ways to Bleed on Stage
15	Suicidal Tendencies	Free Your Soul and Save My Mind
18	My Ruin	A Prayer Under Pressure of Violent Anguish
19	Cannibal Corpse	Live Cannibalism (live)
19	Lowrider	Ode to Io
19	Eyehategod	Confederacy of Ruined Lives
25	Electric Wizard	Dopethrone
25	earthtone9	Arc'tan'gent
26	Lamb of God	New American Gospel
26	Soulfly	Primitive
26	Corrosion of Conformity	America's Volume Dealer

=== October ===
Day	Artist	Album
2	Apocalyptica	Cult
2	Theatre of Tragedy	Musique
2	Acid Drinkers	Broken Head
3	Dying Fetus	Destroy the Opposition
3	Enslaved	Mardraum – Beyond the Within
9	HammerFall	Renegade
9	Severe Torture	Feasting On Blood
10	Slash's Snakepit	Ain't Life Grand
10	Symphony X	V: The New Mythology Suite
10	Spineshank	The Height of Callousness
10	Nonpoint	Statement
16	Virgin Steele	The House of Atreus Act II
17	100 Demons	In the Eyes of the Lord
17	Downset.	Check Your People
17	Limp Bizkit	Chocolate Starfish and the Hot Dog Flavored Water
17	Morbid Angel	Gateways to Annihilation
17	Nevermore	Dead Heart in a Dead World
17	Malevolent Creation	Envenomed
17	Toni Iommi	Iommi
18	Tad Morose	Undead
20	Ram-Zet	Pure Therapy
23	Skyclad	Folkémon
24	Linkin Park	Hybrid Theory
24	Misanthrope	Misanthrope Immortel
24	Overkill	Bloodletting
24	Six Feet Under	Graveyard Classics
24	Fozzy	Fozzy
24	The Hope Conspiracy	Cold Blue
26	Living Sacrifice	The Hammering Process
27	This Day Forward	The Transient Effects of Light on Water
30	Children of Bodom	Follow the Reaper
30	Cradle of Filth	Midian
30	Helloween	The Dark Ride
30	Rhapsody	Dawn of Victory
31	Godsmack	Awake
31	Pain of Salvation	The Perfect Element, Part I
31	Cryptopsy	...And Then You'll Beg
31	Goatsnake	Flower of Disease
31	The Atomic Bitchwax	Atomic Bitchwax II

=== November ===
Day	Artist	Album
6	Carpathian Forest	Strange Old Brew
6	Racer X	Superheroes
7	Immolation	Close to a World Below
7	Yngwie Malmsteen	War to End All Wars
7	Snot	Strait Up
11	Marilyn Manson	Holy Wood (In the Shadow of the Valley of Death)
11	Skycamefalling	10.21
12	Monster Magnet	God Says No
23	Kalmah	Swamplord
27	Behemoth	Thelema.6
27	Rob Rock	Rage of Creation (Non-Japanese releases)
27	Lostprophets	The Fake Sound of Progress

=== December ===
Day	Artist	Album
5	Alice in Chains	Live
5	Godflesh	Messiah (EP)
5	Rage Against the Machine	Renegades
11	Crystal Eyes	In Silence They March
12	Abdullah	Abdullah
12	Ayreon	Ayreonauts Only (compilation)
12	Melt-Banana	Teeny Shiny
14	Walls of Jericho	The Bound Feed the Gagged
15	Boris	Flood
17	Gargoyle	Future Drug
21	Svartsyn	...His Majesty
24	Onmyo-Za	百鬼繚乱
24	Within Temptation	Mother Earth

=== Albums with unknown release dates ===
Month	Artist	Album
February	Eternal Tears of Sorrow	Chaotic Beauty
June	Hamlet	El Inferno
July	Behexen	Rituale Satanum
August	Thyrfing	Urkraft
November	Dynamo (MX)	Raise The Power
December	Watain	Rabid Death's Curse
Unknown	No-Big-Silence	Successful, Bitch & Beautiful
Unknown	Pig Destroyer	7" Picture Disc (EP)
Unknown	Static-X	The Death Trip Continues (EP)
Unknown	Weakling	Dead as Dreams
Unknown	Chicosci	Revenge of the Giant Robot
Unknown	Graveland	Creed of Iron / Prawo Stali
Unknown	Shape of Despair	Shades Of...

== Singles (WIP) ==
=== January ===
Day	Artist	Single
11	Kittie	Brackish
21	AC/DC	Stiff Upper Lip

=== February ===
Day	Artist	Single
11	AC/DC	Safe in New York City

=== April ===
Day	Artist	Single
29	Disturbed	Stupify

=== June ===
Day	Artist	Single
2	Metallica	I Disappear
5	Kittie	Charlotte

=== August ===
Day	Artist	Single
29	Linkin Park	One Step Closer

=== September ===
Day	Artist	Single
18	Melvins	Spit It Out

=== October ===
Day	Artist	Single
29	Disturbed	Down with the Sickness

=== November ===
Day	Artist	Single
29	Disturbed	Voices

=== Singles with unknown release dates ===
Month	Artist	Single
January	Poison	Shut Up, Make Love
February	Poison	Be the One
Unknown	Primer 55	Appetite for Destruction
Unknown	Primer 55	Loose
Unknown	Primer 55	Set It Off
Unknown	Rollins Band	Get Some Go Again
Unknown	Rollins Band	Illumination
Unknown	Skillet	Best Kept Secret
Unknown	Skillet	Come On to the Future
Unknown	Skillet	Invincible
Unknown	Skillet	Rest
Unknown	Skillet	Shout to the Lord
Unknown	Skillet	The One
Unknown	Skillet	You Take My Rights Away
Unknown	Skillet	You're Powerful
Unknown	Skillet	Your Name Is Holy
Unknown	Stratovarius	A Million Light Years Away / Celestial Dream
Unknown	Stratovarius	Hunting High and Low / Millennium

== Disbandments ==
- Brougham
- Osvajači (reformed in 2005)
- Rage Against the Machine
- Sacred Reich (reformed in 2006)

== Events ==
- Al Pitrelli replaces Marty Friedman on guitar for Megadeth.
- Metallica releases a song "I Disappear" that was never released on any studio albums and appears on the Mission: Impossible 2 soundtrack. This song also started the famous Napster Controversy.
- Angela Gossow replaces Johan Liiva on vocals for Arch Enemy.
- Mr. Bungle play their final concert.

== Deaths ==
- September 21 – Peter "Wildfire" Wittke, founding member and guitarist of Iron Angel, died from injuries sustained in a car crash.

Preceded by 1999	Heavy Metal Timeline; 2000	Succeeded by 2001
