= Veronika Decides to Die (album) =

Studio album by Saturnus
- Released: May 2006
- Recorded: 2004–2005
- Studio: The Sweet Silence Studios
- Genre: Death-doom; gothic metal; doom metal
- Length: 59:20
- Label: Firebox Records
- Producer: Flemming Rasmussen

Saturnus chronology
Martyre (2000)	Veronika Decides to Die (2006)	Saturn in Ascension (2012)

Veronika Decides to Die is the third full-length album released by the band Saturnus through Firebox Records. It was released on 3 May 2006. The album is named after Paulo Coelho's book of the same name. The band toured in support of the album since its 2006 release into 2008 with bands such as Agalloch, Novembers Doom, Mar de Grises, and Thurisaz.

== Track listing ==
1. "I Long" – 10:54
2. "Pretend" – 6:26
3. "Descending" – 9:05
4. "Rain Wash Me" – 7:23
5. "All Alone" – 6:19
6. "Embraced by Darkness" – 6:45
7. "To the Dreams" – 5:48
8. "Murky Waters" – 6:40
