= Kaiken Kauniin Loppu =

Studio album by Wasara
- Released: 7 July 2003
- Recorded: 2003
- Studio: Meatfactory Studiolla
- Genre: Hard rock, death metal, groove metal, folk metal
- Length: 42:56
- Label: Firebox Records
- Producer: Wasara, Ilpo Satuli

Wasara chronology
Kaiken Kauniin Loppu (2003)	Meistä On Maa Täysi (2005)

Singles from Kaiken Kauniin Loppu
- 1. "Kivisade / Lihallisia Ajatuksia" Released: Spring 2003

Kaiken Kauniin Loppu is the debut album of Finnish rock group Wasara. It was released in 2003 after the band had won a two album deal with Firebox Records. That deal had come about after the success of the band’s 2002 demo Wasara. All three tracks from that demo; Kivisade, Pahavirsi and Etsijä, appear on this album. Re-recorded versions of Sinulle and Matkalla which had been on the earlier Sinulle demo of 2000 also reappeared on this album. Kivisade was also released as a CD single in Spring 2003 to promote the album. This single included the track Lihallisia Ajatuksia which had not appeared on the demos or the album.

The album is sombre and dark and focuses on despair. This is realised in the mid and slow tempo compositions. Vocals are in Finnish throughout and are a mixture of harsh and clean vocals. The clean vocals are in a deliberately flat tone. There is considerable variation in style within the album.

In 2004 an enhanced Digipak edition of the album was released. This featured a remixed and extended version of the song Pahavirsi and a video of Pohjaton On.

== Reception ==
The album has received mixed reviews. The most favourable are from rateyourmusic.com, where it is given 4.5 out of 5. It is described here as “Dark, necromantic and original”. However at themetalforge.com it is seen as “Uninspiring and generic, yet with glimmers of what could be.”

== Track listing ==
No.	Title	Lyrics	Music	Length
1.	"Untitled"		Wasara	1:15
2.	"Pohjaton On"	Antti Åström	Wasara	3:18
3.	"Kivisade"	Antti Åström	Wasara	4:40
4.	"Pahavirsi"	Antti Åström	Wasara	3:36
5.	"Yön Syli"	Antti Åström	Wasara	4:09
6.	"Osa Minua"	Antti Åström	Wasara	3:07
7.	"Kutsu Pimeään"	Antti Åström	Wasara	5:16
8.	"Sinulle"	Antti Åström	Wasara	3:58
9.	"Hullu Spitaalinen"	Antti Åström	Wasara	1:51
10.	"Matkalla"	Antti Åström	Wasara	4:11
11.	"Etsijä"	Antti Åström	Wasara	4:34
12.	"Mustimpaani"	Antti Åström	Wasara	2:30

Bonus tracks
No.	Title	Lyrics	Music	Length
13.	"Pahavirsi (7.62 Remix)"	Antti Åström	Wasara	4:14
14.	"Pohjaton On (Video)"	Antti Åström	Wasara	3:21

== Personnel ==
- Ipi Kiiskinen – bass
- Mikko Nevanlahti – drums
- Sami Tikkanen – guitar
- Tuomo Tolonen – guitar
- Antti Åström – guitars, vocals

Production

- Tuomo Lehtonen – design
- Sammy Roiha – mastering at Sound Ateljee
- Ilpo Satuli – recording, mixing, programming, producer
- Wasara – producer
