= Aarni =

Finnish avant-garde metal band

- Origin: Finland
- Genres: Avant-garde metal Doom metal Folk metal
- Years active: 1998 – present
- Labels: Epidemie Records; Firebox; Firedoom
- Members: Master Warjomaa
- Website: Aarni.info

Aarni is an avant-garde metal band from Finland, which consists primarily of Master Warjomaa and, occasionally, some session musicians. Although many sources claim the existence of other band members, these may be fictional characters (probably created by Warjomaa himself) and include a French count born in the 17th century (Count of Saint-Germain), a cartoon character with a T-shirt with Aarni's logo (Doomintroll) and an old woman (Mistress Palm).

Aarni's music bears similarities to funeral doom metal (in Reaching Azathoth, for example) and has sometimes similarities to folk metal (The Weird of Vipunen). Their style has been described as almost orthodox doom metallish Lovecraftian-Jungian Kalevala avantgarde music. The band themselves sometimes use the term Chthonic Musick. The lyrics of Aarni include varied themes such as Finnish folklore, transhumanism, the works of H. P. Lovecraft, paganism, parapsychology, psychoanalytical theories and mythology. The lyrics have been sung in English, Finnish, Latin, and occasionally in Enochian, Ancient Egyptian, Ouranian Barbaric, Swedish, and Glossolalic.

== History ==
"Pandemia"
Sample of "Pandemia"

Aarni was founded in 1998, in Finland, by Master Warjomaa (occasionally known as Mahatma M. Warjomaa). Master Warjomaa is also an active member of a doom metal band called Umbra Nihil, playing lead guitar. Aarni released a demo in 2001, and a split album with Umbra Nihil the following year. After a second demo in 2002, Aarni released its first full-length album, Bathos, in 2004. Aarni was signed to Firebox Records's subsidiary label Firedoom Music, but is now signed to Epidemie Records. Aarni released their second album, called Tohcoth, in February 2008. In late 2008 Aarni also released a CD-R EP titled Omnimantia. In April 2012 Aarni released a split album with Persistence in Mourning.

== Controversy ==
=== Band members ===
On Aarni's official website, the band section contains four members (also referred to as "Responsible Cultists"), as well as information concerning each of them. The four members of the band are Master Warjomaa, Comte de Saint-Germain, Doomintroll and Mistress Palm. Warjomaa commented on this in a 2004 interview:

The number of Aarni is five and five is the number of Aarni. Think a while about this and you will see... because Aarni consists of four personalities plus me. Why four? Because I've chosen to adhere to the (Jungian) concept of quaternity - four personality types, four seasons, four equinoxes, four elements, four stations of the sun, four stages of the human life, four cardinal directions, four Qabbalistic worlds, four limbs of the human body, four main themes in Aarni's songs, four basic human brain circuits of Timothy Leary's theory etc. Visualize the pentagram representing human existence: there's four points combined in/ruled by the fifth. It's all of course symbolic. Or is it?

==== Master Warjomaa ====
Master Warjomaa is the alias of the band's most stable member. According to the band's official website, Warjomaa was born in 1974. It is stated that he is influenced by Joe Satriani, Taoism, Camel, and H. P. Lovecraft, that he belongs to the Homo Superior species, and that his favorite place is Cydonia. Along with many other artists, Warjomaa has named Black Sabbath, Candlemass, Hawkwind, King Crimson and Van der Graaf Generator as his musical influences. In a fan interview in June 2006, Warjomaa stated:

"While I prefer a female unicorn deity to a gaseous alpha male vertebrate of cosmic heft anytime, I'd rather choose no deity or deities at all. I think it's high time we stopped worshiping gods and started to aim at becoming gods."

==== Comte de Saint Germain ====
Le Comte de Saint Germain (translated from French: "The Count of Saint Germain") is one of the members of Aarni. His role in the band has been stated as "Sensation, alchemical processes and keys to secrets". It is written that he was born in 1665 and is an "ex-human". It is not stated whether le Comte de Saint Germain was an actual individual that lived centuries ago or if he is an entirely fictional character. It may be possible that le Comte de Saint Germain has something to do with the Count of St Germain, an actual count living in the 18th century.

==== Doomintroll & Mistress Palm ====
Doomintroll has been represented by a cartoon-style drawing of a person with a very prominent nose, a pipe in the mouth, the Aarni logo on the T-shirt, and a hand sticking up the middle finger. According to Aarni he "originated" in 1998, (also the date of the formation of Aarni) which would make him 6 years old at the time of the release of the band's first full-length album. It is written that Doomintroll belongs to the "Duumipeikko" species. "Duumipeikko", roughly translated from Finnish, gives "Doomintroll". This is a reference to the popular Finnish cartoon series, Moomin, in which Muumipeikko is one of the main characters. According to Doomintroll, the band wants to support the anarcho-shamanistic attitude of moomintrolls.

Mistress Palm (also referred to as Mrs. Palm) is the fourth claimed band member. She is depicted as a rather elderly woman in an apron holding a dish brush and opening her mouth in dismay. She has been thought to be a computer program or artificial, phlogiston-driven rectoplasm.

=== Website ===
At the top of the band page is written "4=1". The motive of this equation is maybe to consider the situation of the 4 declared members and one actual member and/or can be a reference to the Jungian concept of quaternity. On the news page (also referred to as the "Unspeakable Tidings"), the news are listed chronologically. However the dates are said to be written in the form corresponding to these in the Discordian calendar. These dates follow the "DD/SS/YYYY" form, as stated on the official website. Therefore, e.g. the year 2007 CE is noted as 3173 AM.

=== Lyrics ===
The lyrics have been sung in English, Finnish, Latin, and occasionally in French, Ancient Egyptian, Glossolalic, Swedish, Ouranian Barbaric and Enochian. In several songs, the lyrics refer to the Cthulhu Mythos.

In "Squaring The Circle", the lyrics say "zero equals two". This may be a reference to the ideas of Aleister Crowley and similar to the "4=1" statement on top of the band page of the official website. In "The Thunder, Perfect Mindfuck", it is said "I am the shameless and I am ashamed" as well as "I am falsehood and I am truth". These could be considered paradoxical and controversial as the Gnostic poem the lyrics seem to be based upon, The Thunder, Perfect Mind.

== Line-up ==
- Master Warjomaa - Creating, playing, and producing most of the lyrics and music.
- Rhesus Christ - Session drums for Bathos.
- Albert Frankenstein - Session vocalist for Bathos.

== Discography ==
=== Demo 2001 ===
Demo 2001 was released independently by Aarni in 2001. It was the first CD release of Aarni. Its cover features a picture of the Conte de Saint-Germain.

Track listing:

1. "Myrrys" - 5:00
2. "The Black Keyes (of R'lyeh)" - 5:53
3. "Metsänpeitto" - 0:58
4. "Persona Mortuae Cutis" - 5:52

"Persona Mortuae Cutis" appears as a cover version of the Slayer song Dead Skin Mask translated to Latin.

=== Aarni / Umbra Nihil Split ===
Aarni / Umbra Nihil Split was released through Firebox Records in 2002.

Track listing:

- Aarni

1. "Ubbo-Sathla" - 3:37
2. "Myrrys" - 5:00
3. "Transcend Humanity" - 12:00
4. "Liber Umbrarum vel Coniunctio" - 6:18
5. "Reaching Azathoth" - 11:55
6. "Anima" - 4:14

- Umbra Nihil

7. "Follow and Believe / Fall Without Relief" - 9:12
8. "A Mere Shell" - 8:25
9. "My Way to the Lakeshore" - 2:04
10. "Determination" - 7:09
11. "Water in Lungs" - 8:31

=== Duumipeikon paluu ===
Duumipeikon paluu was released independently by Aarni in 2002.

Track listing:

1. "Myrrys" - 5:00
2. "Lampaan Vaatteissa" - 6:03
3. "The Weird of Vipunen" - 7:22
4. "Transcend Humanity" - 12:00
5. "Reaching Azathoth" - 11:55

Duumipeikon paluu and Demo 2001 were re-released together in 2003, and re-re-released as a remaster in late 2008. "Duumipeikon paluu" translated from Finnish means "The Return of Doomintroll".

=== Bathos ===
Professional ratings
Review scores
Source	Rating
Metal Temple	9/10 stars

Bathos was released through Firedoom Music, a sub-label of Firebox Records, on November 8, 2004.

Track listing:

1. "Ονειροσκόπος (Oneiroskopos)" - 1:31
2. "Squaring The Circle" - 7:50
3. "Quinotaurus (Twelve Stars In Sight)" - 3:48
4. "Kivijumala" - 11:45
5. "V.I.T.R.I.O.L." - 6:33
6. "The Thunder, Perfect Mindfuck" - 8:32
7. "Mental Fugue" - 6:49
8. "Niut Net Meru" - 9:20
9. "Kesäyö" - 8:59

VV from Umbra Nihil played session drums on the album. Oneiroscope means 'an instrument for watching dreams'. V.I.T.R.I.O.L. is an acronym for "Visita interiora terrae rectificandoque invenies occultum lapidem" in Latin, meaning "Visit the innermost of the earth and by rectifying what is there, you will find the hidden stone." The Thunder, Perfect Mindfuck refers to the gnostic poem The Thunder, Perfect Mind.

The Bathos cover was painted by Tuomas M. Mäkelä (of the ambient band Jääportit) based partially on an earlier artwork he had done. Magister Warjomaa said about it: "We wanted a colourful cover, because I feel very bored with the usual dark-hued album art most metal bands choose for some pathetic reason. But mainly we wanted that cover because to us it has a spaced-out, candlylike and pleasing feeling. THC green feels such a beautiful color..."

=== Tohcoth ===
Tohcoth was released through Epidemie Records on February 19, 2008. The Enochian title was taken from the works of Dr. John Dee: "This name comprehendeth the number of all the fayries, who are diuels next to the state and condition of man". This album featured Sampo Marjomaa as a guest vocalist.

The Tohcoth cover artwork was realized by Genius Albert Frankenstein & Master Warjomaa.

Track listing:

1. Coniuratio Sadoquae
2. The Hieroglyph
3. Riding Down the Miskatonic on a Dead Thing
4. Arouse Coiled Splendour
5. Λογος
6. All Along The Watchtowers
7. Chapel Perilous
8. The Sound of One I Opening
9. The Battle Hymn of The Eristocracy
10. Barbelith
11. Iku-Turso

=== Omnimantia ===
Omnimantia was self-released as a CD-R by Aarni in November 2008. The title means "divination from everything".

Track listing:

1. Rat King
2. Dimwa Depenga
3. This Is Not A Mask
4. Hypnagogia
5. "Untitled"
6. Verivaikerrus / Hurmehanki
7. Lovecraft Knew

=== Aarni / Persistence in Mourning Split ===
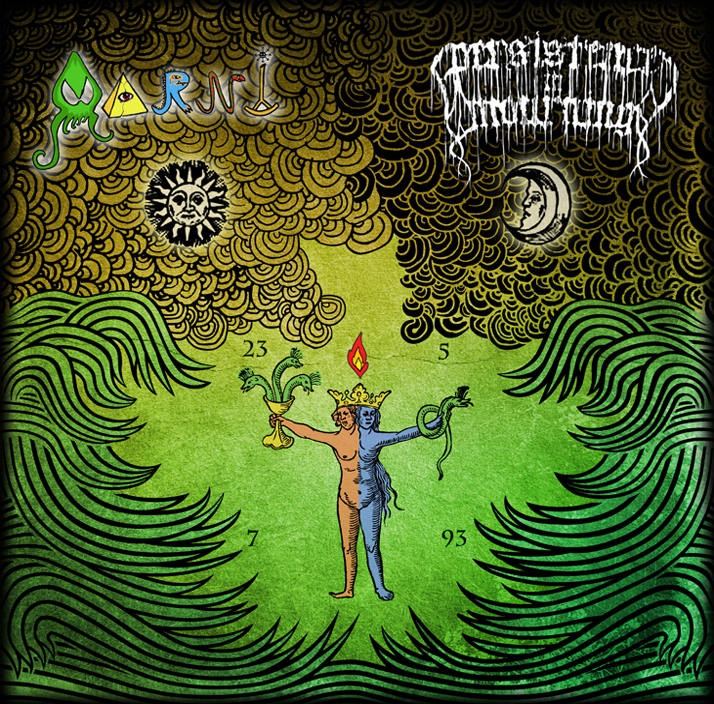

Aarni / Persistence in Mourning Split was released through Witch Sermon Productions on April 1, 2012. The album's artwork was realized by Conte di San Pietro.

Track listing:

- Aarni

1. 49 Angeli Boni
2. Emuu
3. Land Beyond the Night
4. Lemminkäinens Tempel
5. Goetia

- Persistence in Mourning

6. The Passage
7. Tangled Mess of Veins
8. Through Hellfire
9. Purification
10. Poking Holes in the Sky

=== Deliria - Odds and Ends and Beginnings 2000-2012 ===
The album is a collection of 32 tracks, some of which have been only unofficially released as digital downloads.

=== Lovecraftian ===
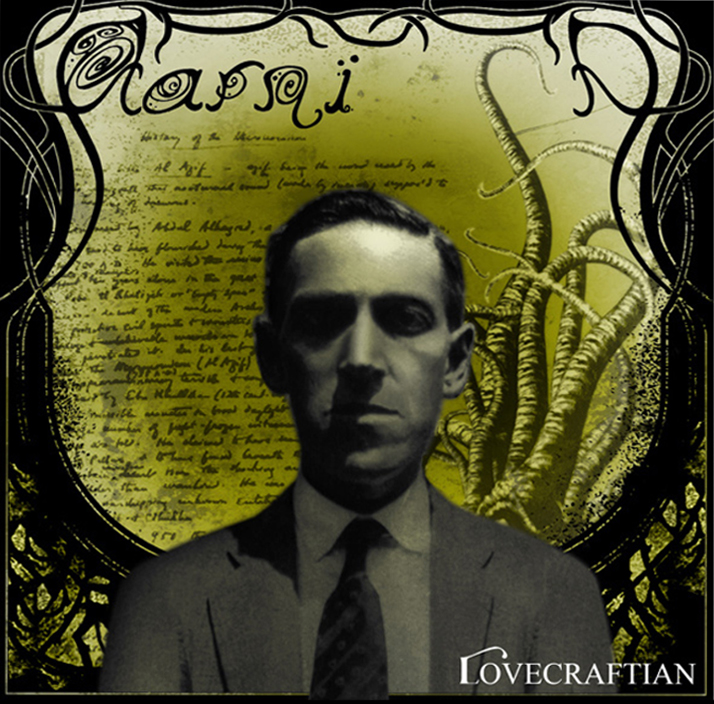

Lovecraftian (TBA, 2017)
