= Fall of the Leafe =

Finnish metal band

Background information
- Origin: Uusikaupunki, Finland
- Genres: Early: Melodic death/black metal, folk metal Later: Gothic metal, progressive metal
- Years active: 1996–2007
- Labels: Firebox, Rage of Achilles, Icarus, Defiled

Fall of the Leafe was a Finnish metal band formed in Uusikaupunki in 1996. The band released six studio albums before disbanding in 2007.

== History ==
The band was formed in Uusikaupunki, with most members later settling in Turku. The formation dates back to 1996 when guitarist Jussi Hänninen, drummer Marko Hyytiä and bassist Juha Kouhi jammed together to Hänninen's riffs and song ideas. Deeming the song material too demanding for so few members, they brought in Kaj Gustafsson as an additional guitarist before vocalist Jani Lindström completed the lineup. In the same year, the band went to Crusell Studio to record five songs that became the demo Storm of the Autumnfall. The following year, another demo was recorded in the same studio.

After the band signed a record deal with Colorado-based Defiled Records, the debut album Evanescent, Everfading was recorded in five days at Tico-Tico Studios in 1997 under the direction of Ahti Kortelainen. However, due to financial reasons, it was not released until the following year. During the recording process, the members realized that their keyboard skills were barely adequate, so Petri Hannuniemi joined the lineup as keyboardist shortly after the recording. Around the same time, Lindström left the group and was replaced by Tuomas Tuominen. The band moved to another rehearsal space a short time later, which burned down after unknown persons broke in, stole most of the members' equipment and set the building on fire. Despite this setback, the band planned to record their second album in late 1998. Having already booked their studio date, Defiled Records ceased its activities. A short time later, Kaj Gustafsson left the group. Mika Rostedt and Pasi Bunda joined as replacements, before both were replaced by Taneli Hatakka shortly after.

Towards the end of 1998, three songs were recorded at Crusell Studio, which were released as a demo in 1999. On this demo, which consisted of three songs, Hänninen played all the guitar tracks, as Hatakka had also left the lineup again. Through the demo, the band reached the attention of the Argentinian label Icarus Music. After that, bassist Kouhi left the group. In 1999, they signed a record deal for two albums with the label. In July and August of that year, the band went to the "Popstudio" of Mika Haapasalo. Since the band was still without a permanent bassist, guitarist Hänninen took over that role. Rostedt had meanwhile also returned as another guitarist. The album was released that year under the name August Wernicke, about seven months after the planned release date. The rest of the year, as well as the following year, the lineup changed several times. Petri Santala was added as a new bassist, who was replaced by a returning Pasi Bunda, who was then replaced by a returning Kouhi. In addition, guitarist Rostedt left Fall of the Leafe and was replaced by Gustafsson.

In January 2001, the band went into Popstudio again, with Haapasalo having rebuilt the studio at a more distant location for the band. However, the recordings did not go smoothly and Jussi Hänninen had to be hospitalized due to an incident. After the recordings were finished and the song material was in the process of mixing, the band was three months behind their schedule. The mixed material was mastered at Finnvox Studios by Mika Jussila. The album was released in January 2002 under the name Fermina. In April, drummer Marko Hyytiä left the group. Matias Aaltonen joined as a replacement, initially only as a session member, then as a permanent one. Aaltonen and Gustafsson had been friends since childhood.

Since the cooperation with Icarus Music had ended, the band was looking for a new label. After a long search, they signed a contract with Rage of Achilles. From September to October 2003, the band worked on its next album at Mika Haapasalo's Popstudio. The song material was mastered at Finnvox Studios by Mika Jussila, before the album was released in May 2004 under the name Volvere. On it, Kouhi is no longer heard as bassist, as he had already left the group again; instead, Hänninen had recorded the bass parts. In addition, after the recordings were finished, keyboardist Hannuniemi left Fall of the Leafe. In 2004, the band was back on stage for the first time in a few years, playing in about a dozen clubs.

After Rage of Achilles ceased its activity, the group again went in search of a label. They sent out about 100 promo packages to various labels, until Firebox Records expressed interest and a contract was signed in September 2004. Through the new label, Volvere was re-released with bonus material. While the re-release was in the works, the members moved to Turku due to the shorter travel distances the members had to travel to rehearse. Miska Lehtivuori joined the band as a new bass player.

In the spring of 2005, recording of the next album began at Popstudio, and it was recorded in several shorter sessions. The album, Vantage, was released through Firebox Records in 2005, on which Hannuniemi is again included as a keyboardist. In 2007, the band's next studio album, Aerolithe, was released, mastered by Svante Forsbäck at Chartmakers Studio in Helsinki. Shortly after, Tuomas Tuominen announced the band's breakup on 20 August of that year. The last performance was held on 14 September.

== Musical style ==
Martin Popoff wrote in The Collector's Guide to Heavy Metal Volume 3: The Nineties about Evanescent, Everfading that it featured an epic mixture of gothic and black metal, with elements of progressive rock also present. The vocals are somewhat monotonous "barking" and the existing keyboard sounds are drowned out by the drums. Elements of Viking metal also evoke memories of Týr and Battlelore. In the fourth volume of his book series, Popoff wrote about Volvere that the album can be placed somewhere between commercial Paradise Lost, mid-paced commercial Metallica, Sentenced and Dream Theater. The vocals fluctuate between clear passages reminiscent of gothic-new-wave and rock roars, while the music repeatedly incorporates folk metal elements from the group's past into a heavy metal framework. He went on to write that the music sounded as if Finntroll were mixing with Evergrey and incorporating Katatonia set pieces. In addition, the songs have a progressive character and influences from Therapy?, Midnight Oil and New Model Army can be discerned. Overall, the album features groovy, riff-oriented and dark stadium rock. Wolf-Rüdiger Mühlmann of Rock Hard categorized Volvere as gothic metal, although the band "half-heartedly imitated Sentenced" and copied the vocals and "pseudo-gothic stupidity" of HIM.

== Band members ==
=== Last lineup ===
- Tuomas Tuominen – vocals
- Jussi Hänninen – guitars
- Kaj Gustafsson – guitars
- Petri Hannuniemi – keyboards
- Miska Lehtivuori – bass
- Matias Aaltonen – drums

(Source:)

=== Former members ===
- Juha Kouhi – bass
- Marko Hyytiä – drums
- Jani Lindström – vocals
- Mika Rostedt – guitars
- Pasi Bunda – guitars, later bass
- Taneli Hatakka – guitars
- Petri Santala – bass

== Discography ==
=== Studio albums ===
- 1998: Evanescent, Everfading (Defiled Records)
- 1999: August Wernicke (Icarus Music)
- 2002: Fermina (Icarus Music)
- 2004: Volvere (Rage of Achilles)
- 2005: Vantage (Firebox Records)
- 2007: Aerolithe (Firebox Records)

=== Other releases ===
- 1996: Storm of the Autumnfall (demo, self-released)
- 1997: Promo 1997 (demo, self-released)
- 1998: Enchanting Part II (split with Flauros, Kyprian's Circle, Withered Garden, Obsession and Arthame; Shades of Autumn Records)
- 1999: Promo 1999 (demo, self-released)
