= Veronika Decides to Die (disambiguation) =

Veronica Decides to Die may refer to:

- Veronika Decides to Die, a novel by Paolo Coelho
- Veronika Decides to Die (film), a 2009 film directed by Emily Young
- Veronika Decides to Die (album), a 2006 album by Saturnus
