= Sworn Vengeance =

Sworn Vengeance may refer to:

- Sworn Vengeance (band), an American metalcore band
- Sworn Vengeance (album), by death metal band Severe Torture
