= Meistä On Maa Täysi =

Studio album by Wasara
- Released: 27 April 2005
- Studio: Seawolf Studios
- Genre: Hard rock, death metal, groove metal, folk metal
- Length: 45:58
- Label: Roihu Records, Firebox Records
- Producer: Wasara, Aaro Seppovaara

Wasara chronology
Kaiken Kauniin Loppu (2003)	Meistä On Maa Täysi (2005)	Hehku (2011)

Singles from Meistä On Maa Täysi
- 1. "Manan Maille" Released: 14 February 2005

Meistä On Maa Täysi is the second studio album of Finnish rock group Wasara. To promote the album, the single "Manan maille" was released on Valentine's Day 2005 as a digital download. In April the new album followed. The album was recorded in the Seawolf Studios by Aaro Seppovaara of Blake, a Finnish rock band. It was the second of a two-album deal with Firebox Records. The album was released on Roihu Record a subsidiary of Firebox. A video was made for the title track. Filmed in black and white, it is a dark tale of suicide and is available on the Firebox compilation Firebox Video Collection (2007).

The material on the album covers both aggressive and melodic tracks, with once again the theme of melancholy and despair. The lyrics (which are made by Antti Åström) are in Finnish. It continues the journey of Wasara with the same kind of deep feelings as the premier album.

== Track listing ==
All lyrics are written by Antti Åström; all music is composed by Wasara.

No.	Title	Length
1.	"Tulen Tuoja"	4:36
2.	"Otteita Hullun Päiväkirjasta"	3:26
3.	"Valoni, Voimani"	3:13
4.	"Manan Maille"	4:05
5.	"Meistä On Maa Täysi"	4:31
6.	"Ihminen"	3:18
7.	"Tunteeton"	3:03
8.	"Laskeudu Yö Ylleni"	5:20
9.	"Luovuttajan Mietteitä"	4:00
10.	"Siipesi, Elämäsi"	10:26

== Personnel ==
- Ipi Kiiskinen – accordion (tracks: 1, 10), bass guitar
- Harri Lempinen – drums
- Sami Tikkanen – guitar
- Tuomo Tolonen – guitar
- Antti Åström – vocals, guitars

Guest musicians

- Aaro Seppovaara – guitar (track: 4)

Production

- Tuomo Lehtonen – artwork
- Petri Majuri – mastering
- Wasara and Aaro Seppovaara – producer
- Aaro Seppovaara – mixing, programming, recording
