= The Storm Within =

The Storm Within may refer to:

== Film and television ==
- The working title for the soap opera The Secret Storm
- The Storm Within, originally titled Les Parents terribles, an adaptation of the play
- The Storm Within (2013 film), originally titled Rouge sang, a 2013 Canadian film

== Albums ==
- The Storm Within (Evergrey album), an album by Evergrey
- The Storm Within (Saturnus album), an album by Saturnus
