= Misanthropic Carnage =

Studio album by Severe Torture
- Released: September 23, 2002
- Recorded: Spring 2002, Frankys Recording Kitchen
- Genre: Death metal
- Length: 32:19
- Label: Hammerheart Records
- Producer: Berthus Westerhuys, Robbie Woning and Severe Torture

Severe Torture chronology
| Butchery of the Soul (2002) | Misanthropic Carnage (2002) | Fall of the Despised (2005) |

Professional ratings
Review scores
| Source | Rating |
|---|---|
| Metalstorm.ee | Link |

Misanthropic Carnage is the second studio album released by the death metal band Severe Torture in 2002. It was recorded at Franky's Recording Kitchen in The Netherlands with producers Berthus Westerhuys and Robbie Woning.

== Track listing ==
1. Mutilation Of The Flesh - 03:14
2. Meant To Suffer - 04:05
3. Carnivorous Force - 02:48
4. Misanthropic Carnage - 04:33
5. Blinded I Slaughter - 03:54
6. Impelled To Kill - 01:58
7. Castrated - 04:40
8. Forever To Burn - 01:42
9. Your Blood Is Mine - 05:25

== Personnel ==
- Dennis Schreurs – vocals
- Thijs van Laarhoven – guitar
- Patrick Boleij – bass
- Seth van de Loo – drums
