= Saturn in Ascension =

Studio album by Saturnus
- Released: 30 November 2012
- Recorded: 2011–2012
- Genre: Death-doom; gothic metal; doom metal
- Length: 70:02
- Label: Cyclone Empire
- Producer: Flemming Rasmussen

Saturnus chronology
Veronika Decides to Die (2006)	Saturn in Ascension (2012)	The Storm Within (2023)

Professional ratings
Review scores
Source	Rating
Heavymetal.dk	10/10 stars
Metal.de	9/10
Rock Hard	8.5/10

Saturn in Ascension is the fourth full-length album released by the band Saturnus. It was released on 30 November 2012 via Cyclone Empire Records, after departing from Firebox Records. The album was produced by Flemming Rasmussen, known for his production work with Metallica, Morbid Angel, and Blind Guardian. Artwork was made by Frode Sylthe, who has worked for At the Gates, Napalm Death, and The Haunted.

== Track listing ==
1. "Litany of Rain" - 10:33
2. "Wind Torn" - 9:14
3. "A Lonely Passage" - 5:30
4. "A Fathers Providence" - 5:09
5. "Mourning Sun" - 10:37
6. "Call of the Raven Moon" - 7:37
7. "Forest of Insomnia" - 10:21
8. "Between" - 11:01
