= ShamRain =

Finnish rock band

- Origin: Helsinki, Finland
- Genres: Alternative rock; gothic rock
- Years active: 2000–present
- Labels: Firebox, Spinefarm
- Members: Minna Sihvonen; Kalle Pyyhtinen; Jukka Laine; Mikko Kolari; Matti Reinola
- Past members: Mika Tauriainen; Janne Jukarainen; Risto Ylönen

ShamRain is a Finnish dark rock band from Helsinki, formed in 2000 by Janne Jukarainen and Matti Reinola. Their style is described as slow, atmospheric and dreamlike. The band released its second album, Someplace Else, in 2005 via Firebox Records.

== Musical style ==
ShamRain has been described as alternative rock, atmospheric rock, dark rock, and gothic rock. The band almost completely foregoes the distorted guitars that are otherwise typical of rock music. Instead, in addition to delay, echo, and chorus effects, they also use a keyboard that imitates strings and choirs. This creates an atmospheric, melancholic, oppressive mood.

Radiohead, The Cure, Placebo, Porcupine Tree, Antimatter, and Anathema have been named as comparable artists.

== Members ==
- Kalle Pyyhtinen – guitars, keyboards
- Mikko Kolari – guitars
- Matti Reinola – bass guitar, keyboards
- Minna Sihvonen – vocals
- Jukka Laine – drums

== Discography ==
- Pieces (2002, MCD)
- Empty World Excursion (2003)
- ShamRain (EP/2004)
- Someplace Else (2005)
- Deeper into the Night (2006, EP)
- Goodbye to All That (2007)
- Isolation (2011)
- Lost Goodbyes (2021, EP)

ShamRain also appears on the track "Charlotte Sometimes" on the album Our Voices – A Tribute to the Cure (2004).
