= Fall of the Despised =

Studio album by Severe Torture
- Released: Spring 2005
- Recorded: Winter 2004/2005
- Genre: Death metal
- Length: 40:24
- Label: Earache Records
- Producer: Hans Pieters and Severe Torture

Severe Torture chronology
Misanthropic Carnage (2002)	Fall of the Despised (2005)	Sworn Vengeance (2007)

Professional ratings
Review scores
Source	Rating
RoadrunnerRecords.com/BLABBERMOUTH.NET	Link

Fall of the Despised is the third studio album released by the death metal band Severe Torture in 2005. It was recorded in the Netherlands by producer Hans Pieters. It is the first album to feature guitarist Marvin Vriesde.

== Track listing ==
1. Endless Strain of Cadavers - 04:06
2. Sawn Off - 04:14
3. Unconditional Annihilation - 03:37
4. Consuming the Dying - 04:27
5. Impulsive Mutilation - 04:56
6. Dead from the Waist up - 03:31
7. Decree of Darkness - 03:47
8. Enshrined in Madness - 05:21
9. End of Christ - 05:11
10. Fall of the Despised - 01:15

== Personnel ==
- Dennis Schreurs – vocals
- Thijs van Laarhoven – rhythm guitar
- Patrick Boleij – bass
- Seth van de Loo – drums
- Marvin Vriesde – lead guitar
