= Wasara =

Finnish rock band

Background information
- Origin: Finland
- Genres: Heavy metal Hard rock Folk metal Death metal
- Years active: 1999–present
- Labels: Firebox Records, Roihu Records, Inverse Records
- Members: Harri Lempinen, Tipi Vainio, Ipi Kiiskinen, Antti Åström, Tuomo Tolonen and Saku Lempinen
- Past members: Sami Tikkanen, Mikko Nevanlahti

Wasara is a Finnish language rock music band from Lohja, Finland that formed in 1999. They are known for their depressive doom style.

== Name ==
Wasara in old Finnish orthography means ‘Hammer’. The modern spelling is Vasara.

== History ==
Antti Åström, Ipi Kiiskinen and Mikko Nevanlahti were childhood friends in the town of Lohja in Southern Finland, and in 1996 they decided to form a band. The band was formed as Ali Baba and took influences from a range of musical genres including punk and rock. In 1999 the band changed its name to Wasara and Sami Tikkanen was added on guitars. Two demos were released on CD between 2000 and 2002. The first of these; Sinulle did not create the type of sound that the band were looking for. The second, a self-titled work was more successful and secured a two-album deal with Firebox Records. Their first album Kaiken Kauniin Loppu was released in 2003. Mikko Nevanlahti left shortly afterwards and was replaced by Tuukka Heikurinen on drums.

Before the release of the second album Meistä On Maa Täysi in 2005 Harri-Lempinen had taken over on drums. The second album was released on Roihu Records, which was a division of Firebox. A further change with Saku Lempinen replacing Sami Tikkanen on guitars took place in 2008. The third album Hehku was released in 2011. The band reportedly split in early 2012 however by 2014 they were back together playing live gigs. They remained active until at least March 2016, but there has been no new recording.

== Musical style ==
Lyrically Wasara focus on the subjects of despair, sorrow and pain. Suicide is a common issue in their lyrics. At times the harsh lyrical style is that of Death Metal. However the songs are produced at a mid-tempo with some folk elements and may also be described as Groove Metal. Their music has been defined as 90s Heavy Rock rather than Metal. It has also been compared with early Amorphis. Although melancholy is a common thread, their albums offer variation in style and pace, with clean and harsh vocals used.

=== Current lineup ===
- Antti Åström – vocals, guitar, lyricist (1996–)
- Ipi Kiiskinen– Bass guitar (1996–)
- Tuomo Tolonen – guitar (2001–)
- Harri Lempinen – drums (2004–)
- Saku Lempinen – guitar (2008–)
- Tipi Vainio – Keyboards (2014–)

=== Past members ===
- Sami Tikkanen – guitar (1999–2008)
- Mikko Nevanlahti – drums (1996–2003)
- Tuukka Heikuriseen – drums (2003–2004)

== Discography ==
=== Demos ===
- Sinulle (2000) Not on label
- Wasara (2002) Not on label

=== Albums ===
- Kaiken Kauniin Loppu (All in a Beautiful End) (2003)
- Meistä On Maa Täysi (2005)
- Hehku (The Glow) (2011)

=== Singles ===
- Kivisade (Stone Rain) – CD Single (2003)
- Manan Maille – Digital (2005)
- Kuollut On Kuollut – Digital (2011)
