= Bright Flashes =

Studio album by Snapcase
- Released: November 4, 2003
- Recorded: March 2002 to September 2003
- Studio: Salad Days Studio, Beltsville, Maryland
- Length: 38:46
- Label: Victory
- Producer: Brian McTernan; Frank Vicario

Snapcase chronology
End Transmission (2002)	Bright Flashes (2003)

Professional ratings
Review scores
Source	Rating
AllMusic	3/5 stars
Lollipop Magazine	Mixed

Bright Flashes is the fifth and final studio album by American hardcore punk band Snapcase, released in 2003 through Victory Records. It consists of five songs initially conceived during the sessions of their previous album End Transmission, four newly recorded cover songs, and three remixes/re-recordings of End Transmission songs.

== Track listing ==
All tracks are written by Snapcase, except where noted.

Bright Flashes track listing
No.	Title	Writer(s)	Length
1.	"Believe / Revolt (Relocation Blueprint)"		2:30
2.	"Dress Rehearsal"		3:45
3.	"Blacktop" (Helmet cover)	Page Hamilton	3:19
4.	"Skeptic"		2:23
5.	"Ten A.M. (Good Morning, Mr. Coelecanth)"		5:39
6.	"New Academy"		3:04
7.	"Mountain Song" (Jane's Addiction cover)	Perry Farrell, Dave Navarro, Eric Avery, Stephen Perkins	3:59
8.	"Depth of Field"		2:11
9.	"Freedom of Choice" (Devo cover)	Mark Mothersbaugh, Gerald Casale	2:29
10.	"Gates of Steel" (Devo cover)	Mothersbaugh, Casale, Sue Schmidt, Debbie Smith	3:18
11.	"Makeshift Tourniquet"		2:10
12.	"Exile Etiquette (Only British People Can Fly)"		3:54

== Personnel ==
Snapcase

- Daryl Taberski – vocals
- Frank Vicario – guitar
- Jon Salemi – guitar
- Dustin Perry – bass
- Ben Lythberg – drums

Additional musicians

- Bill Snow – programming

Production

- Brian McTernan – producer, engineer, mixing
- Frank Vicario – producer, engineer, mixing (tracks 3, 7, 9, 10)
- Blaise Barton – mastering
