= End Transmission =

Studio album by Snapcase
- Released: September 24, 2002
- Studios: Salad Days Studio, Beltsville, Maryland
- Genres: Hardcore punk; emo; melodic hardcore
- Length: 45:39
- Label: Victory
- Producer: Brian McTernan

Snapcase chronology
Designs for Automotion (2000)	End Transmission (2002)	Bright Flashes (2003)

Professional ratings
Review scores
Source	Rating
AllMusic	3/5 stars
Pitchfork	4.3/10

End Transmission is the fourth studio album by American hardcore punk band Snapcase. The album was released on September 24, 2002, through Victory Records.

== Musical style and sound ==
End Transmission has been described as hardcore punk, emo, and melodic hardcore. While the album still retains the aggressiveness of the band's previous material, the album has a greater focus on melody and ambience, resulting in a sound comparable to Quicksand and Deftones.

== Track listing ==
All tracks are written by Snapcase.

No.	Title	Length
1.	"Coagulate"	2:19
2.	"Cadence"	1:16
3.	"The Beat"	2:12
4.	"Believe, Revolt"	2:27
5.	"Ten A.M."	5:33
6.	"First Word"	3:05
7.	"New Kata"	3:34
8.	"A Synthesis of Classical Forms"	6:13
9.	"Aperture"	2:16
10.	"Exile Etiquette"	5:12
11.	"Interrogation"	3:19
12.	"Litmus Test"	3:23
13.	"Id / Hindsight"	4:50
Total length:		45:39

== Personnel ==
Snapcase

- Daryl Taberski – vocals
- Jon Salemi – guitar
- Frank Vicario – guitar
- Dustin Perry – bass
- Timothy Redmond – drums

Additional

- Brian McTernan – engineer, producer
- Michael Barbiero – mixing
- Mike Scielzi – mixing assistant
- George Marino – mastering
- John Kelson Jr. – computers
- Clint Woodside – design
- Jess Kourkounis – photography
