= Depressed Mode =

Finnish band

- Origin: Finland
- Genres: Death/doom metal, funeral doom metal
- Years active: 2005–present
- Label: Firebox Records
- Members: Ossy Salonen; Natalie Koskinen; Tomppa Turpeinen; Iiro Aittokoski; Teemu Heinola; Henri Hakala
- Website: http://www.depressedmode.net

Depressed Mode is a death/doom/funeral doom metal band from Finland.

== History ==
Depressed Mode was formed in 2005 as a solo project of Ossy Salonen. Tomppa Turpeinen later joined as guitarist and Natalie Koskinen (Shape of Despair) as second vocalist. The band was signed by Firebox Records and recorded their first album Ghosts of Devotion with drummer Marko Tommila.

Jori Haukio left the band in late 2007, and Teemu Heinola took his place as a guitarist. Marko Tommila left the band in 2008 and Iiro Aittokoski replaced him.

The band recorded its second album ..For Death in summer 2008, which was released in February 2009; Kerrang! gave the album a 3/5 rating.

In a 2018 interview with doom-metal.com regarding Depressed Mode, vocalist Natalie Koskinen stated that nobody actively placed it to the side, but "life happened and Ossi wanted to centralize on his main work and family." Koskinen aired skepticism that Depressed Mode would ever be active again.

In December 2020, the band released a statement regarding production of their 3rd studio album, stating that it would be released some time in 2021; the album, Decade of Silence, was subsequently released in May 2022.

== Personnel ==
- Ossy Salonen – vocals, synth, programming
- Natalie Koskinen – vocals
- Tomppa Turpeinen – guitars
- Iiro Aittokoski – drums
- Teemu Heinola – guitars
- Henri Hakala – bass

== Discography ==
- Ghosts of Devotion (2007)
- ...For Death (2009)
- Decade of Silence (2022)
