= Progression Through Unlearning =

Studio album by Snapcase
- Released: April 8, 1997
- Recorded: January 1997
- Studio: Trax Fast Studios; Union City, New Jersey
- Genre: Hardcore punk; metalcore; alternative metal; post-hardcore
- Length: 32:25
- Label: Victory
- Producer: Steve Evetts; Snapcase

Snapcase chronology
Lookinglasself (1993)	Progression Through Unlearning (1997)	Designs for Automotion (2000)

Professional ratings
Review scores
Source	Rating
Punk Planet	4/5 stars
Vice	5/5 stars

Progression Through Unlearning is the second studio album by American hardcore punk band Snapcase. The album was released on April 8, 1997, through Victory Records.

== Background and recording ==
The album was recorded over a two-week period in January 1997 at the Trax Studios in Union City, New Jersey, and was produced by Steve Evetts. The band retrospectively shared how during the recording process, guitarist Jon Salemi was sick with the chickenpox. Ten years following the release, the band jokingly admitted the process of recording and mastering the album was rushed, but blamed their adolescence of rushing through the album.

== Track listing ==
All tracks are written by Snapcase, except where noted.

Progression Through Unlearning track listing
No.	Title	Writer(s)	Length
1.	"Caboose"		2:33
2.	"Guilty by Ignorance"		2:37
3.	"Harrison Bergeron"		3:07
4.	"Priceless"		2:48
5.	"Zombie Prescription"		3:21
6.	"Killing Yourself to Live"	Snapcase, Scott Dressler	3:26
7.	"She Suffocates"		2:57
8.	"Weak Tyrant"		2:57
9.	"Vent"	Snapcase, Dressler	3:27
10.	"Breaking and Reaching"		4:22
11.	"Outro"		0:50
Total length:			32:25

== Legacy ==
Although not heavily reviewed at the time of its release, the album has been retrospectively praised for ushering in metalcore of the 2000s, and a revival of melodic hardcore in the late 2010s and early 2020s. Several notable hardcore bands of the 2020s including Drug Church, Higher Power, and Turnstile have cited and been compared to Progression Through Unlearning as an influence of their works.

== Personnel ==
Snapcase

- Daryl Taberski – vocals
- Frank Vicario – guitar
- Jon Salemi – guitar
- Bob Whiteside – bass
- Timothy Redmond – drums
