= My Shameful =

Doom/death metal band

- Origin: Finland
- Genres: Death metal, doom metal
- Years active: 1999–present
- Label: Firedoom Records
- Members: Jürgen Fröhling; Sami Rautio
- Past members: Mario Hahn; Twist; Mark Napier; Harri Jussila

My Shameful was a doom/death metal band with Finnish, German and American members. The band also had heavy funeral doom influences. Originating as a two-person studio project in Finland during the year 1999, they have recorded three demos and six albums. The demos were recorded with Sami Rautio and Harri Jussila as participating members. The line-up was completed in 2004 with drummer Mark Napier, bassist Twist, and guitar player Mario. My Shameful parted ways with Mark Napier in spring of 2007, due to Mark's difficulties with live shows, a new drummer was found in Jürgen Fröhling.

During the year 2008 My Shameful recorded their fourth full-length studio album "Descend". Due to Sami Rautio moving back to Finland, the album was recorded in several locations.

In 2013 the self-released album Penance came out.

In 2014 the band signed deal with Russians MFL-Records to release their new album "Hollow" which came out in November 2014.

== Discography ==
=== Albums ===
- Of All the Wrong Things (2003)
- ...of Dust (2004)
- The Return to Nothing (2006)
- Descend (2008)
- Penance (2013)
- Hollow (2014)

=== EPs ===
- To All I Hated (2002)

=== Demos ===
- Sown in Sadness (2000)
- Your Dark Overwhelming (2000)
- To All I Hated (2000)
