= Throes of Dawn =

Finnish metal band

- Origin: Finland
- Genres: Progressive metal, gothic metal, folk metal (early), black metal (early)
- Years active: 1994–present
- Labels: Auto-Production (1994–95); Woodcut Records (1995–98); Wounded Love (2000–04); Avantgarde Music (2004–10); Firebox Records (2010–12)
- Members: Henri "Kaamos" Koivula; Jani "Zeus" Heinola; Taneli "Stuka" Nyholm; Juha Ylikoski; Henri Andersson; Juuso Backman
- Past members: Matti Suomela; Toni Jokinen; Teemu Jokinen; Mikko; Mathias Pharmacist; Jani "Martex" Martikkala; Harri Huhtala
- Website: Official website

Throes of Dawn is a Finnish metal band. The group formed in 1994 by Henri Koivula (vocals) and Jani Heinola (synth). The band has been known as emotional dark metal. The band's sound is built on the combination of synths and guitars, laced with clean vocals and additional growling and screaming vocals. The lyrical concept of Throes of Dawn is often poetic, reflecting the deeper and darker aspects of the human psyche; solitude, feelings of loss, and the fears and pains of existence.

== History ==
The band's sound mixes synthesizer and guitars with a blend of clean vocals along with additional growling and screaming vocals. The band's lyrics are often known as poetic, expressing the darker aspects of solitude, feelings of loss and the fears and pains of life. Their debut album Pakkasherra was released in 1997, and the band has since released six albums. On 30 April 2010 the band played their album The Great Fleet of Echoes from start to finish for a special live performance at the Graveyard Party 2010 in Gloria, Helsinki.

=== Full line-up, demos and first album release (1995–97) ===
After getting their full line-up together, the band started making their first demo tape. After the demo tape was released the band signed with Woodcut Records in 1995, making it the first deal of the band's history. This led to the release of their promo tape Pakkasherra in 1996, which preceded the album Pakkasherra in 1997. Later that year the band supported the Norwegian black Metal band Satyricon in Helsinki.

=== Dreams of the Black Earth record release (1997–99) ===
The band's second full-length album Dreams of the Black Earth was recorded in the legendary Tico-Tico studio in late 1997. This album showcased a unique sound as well as a maturation and progression from Pakkasherra. Only one song from the album, "Dreams of the Black Earth", was issued as a promotional track in 1998 on The Blackened Rainbow MCD. In 1999 Dreams of the Black Earth was released worldwide.

=== New record label with release of third album (1999–2000) ===
The recording of the band's third album Binding of the Spirit took place at Tico-Tico studios in Autumn 1999. The album had a better sound quality than their previous albums as well as more refined production than they had previously added to the dark metal genre. The album was released through the avant-garde music sub-label Wounded Love in Spring 2000. It received positive reviews from the press and listeners worldwide.

=== Hiatus (2000–03) ===
After the release of Binding of the Spirit, the founders of the band, Henri Koivula and Jani Heinola, moved from their hometown Vaasa to Turku and Helsinki. During this time the band did not perform together for several months, and Jani and Henri considered splitting up the band altogether. However, they later decided to regroup with the band with a new line-up, with all members but Henri residing in Helsinki.

The new members came from bands that were already familiar to Jani and Henri from their time in Vaasa: the lead guitarist Juha Ylikoski had played with the band Rotten Sound, the bassist Harri Huhtala had played in Cartilage and Vomiturition. Their drummer Jani Martikkala had been with …And Oceans, Black Dawn and Enochian Crescent.

=== Quicksilver Clouds (2004–05) ===
After several years of songwriting, Throes of Dawn started recording their fourth album Quicksilver Clouds in 2003 at Sonic-pump studios in Helsinki. The band added to their traditional sound, which helped introduce new elements to the genre of dark metal. After a year in the studio Quicksilver Clouds was finally released in 2004 by Avantgarde Music, with positive feedback from metal music outlets. During the promotion of the new album, Throes of Dawn performed numerous successful live shows with bands like Anathema, Orphaned Land and Green Carnation. Besides performing in Finland they also went to Germany, the Netherlands and Russia.

=== New album, new member, and new management (2006–10) ===
It took altogether almost six years for Throes of Dawn to release their fifth album The Great Fleet of Echoes. After the release of Quicksilver Clouds the band started to experiment with new elements and sounds for their music. They composed new material and recorded new demos, but they did not receive a deadline from their record label. The band eventually decided to record the album themselves, with the help of familiar sound technicians. The official recording of the album did not start until around November 2007. After various locations and sessions, the recordings and mixing ended in November 2009.

In early 2010 Throes of Dawn announced new member, keyboardist Henri Andersson. The band released a statement to metalunderground.com, which read: "We are very happy to announce a new addition to our line up. In Hard Rock Laager festival keyboardist Henri Andersson became our sixth permanent member. Mr. Andersson has been playing with us live since the beginning of 2010 and fits our gang perfectly. Welcome to the band Henri!"

The mastering of The Great Fleet of Echoes was done in Finnvox Studios. The band introduced melancholic and atmospheric changes into their music. The Great Fleet of Echoes also expanded the band's foray into songwriting, including adding progressive elements. The Great Fleet of Echoes was released worldwide through their new current label Firebox Records in February 2010.

=== Theft of equipment and change of drummers (2011–13) ===
By 3 January 2011 Throes of Dawn had received acclaim for The Great Fleet of Echoes, including from Finnish Inferno magazine, which chose The Throes of Dawn as the second-best Finnish album of 2010. The Spanish magazine Friedhof ranked the album in their list of 2010's top 10 best albums. A few days after the great feedback for the album, between 10 and 12 January 2011, the band's training facility was broken into and almost all of their equipment was stolen. Many valuable items were taken, including the Marshall JCM800 that was used on the first three Throes of Dawn albums.

The break-in had a significant impact on the band, who said that much of the equipment taken was irreplaceable and featured unique designs. The value of the goods that were stolen exceeded $10,000. The Police Department Property crime unit of Helsinki investigated, and they received numerous tips. One tip-off led to a significant amount of the equipment being found several weeks later, on 27 January 2011. Not many details could be revealed, for the thieves that stole the goods were still missing.

On 9 February 2011 the band received a nomination for best Gothic metal album of the year for their album The Great Fleet of Echoes. Throes of Dawn officially announced the departure of long time drummer Jani "Martex" Martikkala on 9 November 2012; according to their official page:

"Throes of Dawn has parted ways with the drum player, Jani Martikkala. Jani has been a member in the band for 10 years, and needless to say, we share lots of good memories together. However, life and priorities change and we decided to part ways with mutual agreement."

Soon afterwards, they made an announcement of new drummer Juuso Backman, formerly of Swath, Thales, and All Dreams Dying. Throes of Dawn also made the statement "Juuso shares the taste and vision of how our music should sound like, so he will be a perfect addition to the Throes of Dawn roster." At that time, their next album was expected to be released from early to mid-2013.

=== Sixth studio album (2014–present) ===
The band posted a statement on their official on 24 April 2014, speaking after a nearly three-year silence to announce the impending arrival of a new album. The statement read, in part:

"OK folks, Time to breach the long silence and see what's happening in the TOD land: We are soon entering studio to record the drums and some miscellaneous instruments for the upcoming sixth album. The recordings will take place early May in D-STUDIO at Klaukkala, Finland. We have carefully selected and refined seven songs which might potentially appear on the upcoming album. We have put quite a lot of effort on these songs; a lot of hours spent at the rehearsal place playing and drinking beer and thinking about the compositions and structures."

On 30 March 2015 they announced that Henri, their vocalist had finalized the vocal tracks for the remaining songs on the album in D-studio, Klaukkala, Finland. The album, Our Voices Shall Remain, was eventually released on 20 August 2016.

== Record label ==
In September 2009 Throes of Dawn signed to Firebox Records, with whom they released their 2010 effort The Great Fleet of Echoes.

== Band members ==
- Henri Koivula – all vocals (1994–present)
- Jani "Zeus" Heinola – guitars and synths, backing vocals (1994–present), clean vocals (1994–2000)
- Juha Ylikoski – lead guitars (2003–present)
- Taneli "Stuka" Nyholm – bass (2019–present)
- Henri Andersson – keyboards (2010–present)
- Juuso Backman – drums, percussion (2012–present)

=== Former members ===
- Matti Suomela – bass (1994–2001)
- Toni Jokinen – lead guitarist (1994–2001)
- Teemu Jokinen – drums, percussion (1994–2001)
- Mikko – lead guitarist (2001–03)
- Mathias Pharmacist – lead guitarist (2001–03)
- Jani "Martex" Martikkala – drums, percussion (2001–12)
- Harri Huhtala – bass (2001–2016)

== Discography ==
=== Studio albums ===
- Pakkasherra (1997)
- Dreams of the Black Earth (1998)
- Binding of the Spirit (2000)
- Quicksilver Clouds (2004)
- The Great Fleet of Echoes (2010)
- Our Voices Shall Remain (2016)

=== EPs ===
- The Blackened Rainbow (1998)

=== Demos ===
- With the Northern Wind (1994)

=== Promos ===
- Pakkasherra (1996)
