= The Storm Within (Saturnus album) =

Studio album by Saturnus
- Released: 16 June 2023
- Genres: Doom metal, death-doom, funeral doom
- Length: 59:17
- Label: Prophecy Productions

Saturnus chronology
Saturn in Ascension (2012)	The Storm Within (2023)

The Storm Within is the fifth studio album by Danish doom metal band Saturnus. It was released in 2023 by Prophecy Productions.

== Reception ==
In the band's native Denmark, Heavymetal.dk gave an 8/10 rating. While it was lower than the perfect 10 that the same site had bestowed upon Saturn in Ascension, it was "well orchestrated and well composed" with a good balance between the "hard and brutal versus the tender and frail". The Storm Within could on the other hand have benefitted from "more schwung and possibly a couple of elements of surprise".

Rock Hard landed a bit lower with a 7 out of 10, as did Metal Hammer Germany with a 4 out of 7. In Norway, both Scream Magazine and Norway Rock Magazine gave 4 points out of 6. The former recognized the music as being "classic Saturnus", albeit almost "too classic", with the band playing a bit safe. The album was a bit boring and used Paradise Belongs to You as too much of a "blueprint". Norway Rock Magazine complained about a slow opening where the band only hit their stride toward the end of the 11-minute song. After that, the quality picked up, Saturnus delivering "beautiful darkness".

Sonic Seducer disagreed, stating that the recording was not "a mere repetition of their familiar trademarks". Metal.de praised the album with a 9/10 score, calling it "a beautiful comeback album, crafted with palpable dedication. The deep, resonant bass, poignant guitar melodies, subtly placed drumming, plaintive clean vocals, and defiant growls blend together seamlessly for the most part. Every bar is meticulously crafted, and the journey into the bittersweet world created by SATURNUS is a captivating experience".

== Track listing ==
No.	Title	Length
1.	"The Storm Within"	11:24
2.	"Chasing Ghosts"	11:12
3.	"The Calling"	6:59
4.	"Even Tide"	7:31
5.	"Closing the Circle"	9:19
6.	"Breathe New Life"	5:28
7.	"Truth"	7:23
