= Thurisaz (band) =

Belgian metal band from Wervik, Belgium

- Also known as: ModiliuM
- Origin: Wervik, Belgium
- Genres: Black metal, death-doom
- Years active: 1997–2024
- Labels: Shiver Records; Sleaszy Rider Records
- Spinoffs: Ka'Una
- Past members: Peter Theuwen, Mattias Theuwen, Pepijn De Raeymaecker, Kobe Cannière, Hannes Leroy, Lars Vereecke, Bjorn "Bud" Vandewalle, Nick Meganck
- Website: thurisaz.be

Thurisaz was a Belgian metal band from Wervik. Their music is a combination of atmospheric death-doom and black metal.

== History ==
The band had its beginnings in May 1997 as the quartet ModiliuM. Peter and Mattias Theuwen, Lars Vereecke, and Pepijn De Raeymaecker were childhood friends who lived near each other. They started out playing a mixture of death metal, doom metal, and metalcore. For about a year, the band sought a new member to play keyboards; Kobe Cannière joined the band in this role in 1999, and this addition led their sound to become less metalcore and instead more atmospheric death/black metal, with melodic elements. At that time, since the band felt they had matured and reached their desired style, they changed their name to Thurisaz; one interpretation of this rune is "the fusion of different opinions" which the band saw as reflecting their perception of themselves and their music.

Over the first five years of their existence, the band created three demos. Then, in 2002 and 2003 respectively, Thurisaz won the Belgian Metal Concours and the Mundo Metal Concours, giving them a boost of confidence that eventually lead to the creation of their first studio album.

This album, Scent of a Dream, was originally released on March 6, 2004. It was self-released, and so it was not widely distributed in physical stores, but was available online. Lyrically, its songs focus on "dreams" and "moods".

Thurisaz supported Novembers Doom as the opening act during their headlining European tour in November 2006 with Agalloch and Saturnus. It was Thurisaz's first touring experience, and it increased their exposure. They also became "good friends" with the other bands; Thurisaz would repeatedly tour with and also collaborate with Novembers Doom and Saturnus in the future.

Thurisaz's second album, Circadian Rhythm, was released April 28, 2007 through Shiver Records. The band says the primary theme of the album comes from the titular idea of circadian rhythm, with the lyrics inspired by "the cycle of life and everything around it, from birth till death" and how people in different life stages "adapt their lives to the situations they are in."

Thurisaz supported Oceans of Sadness during their CD presentation of their album Mirror Palace in the Spring of 2007 in Belgium and the Netherlands. Thurisaz also performed at the Chicago Powerfest in the United States in April 2007, and the Graspop Metal Meeting in Belgium in June 2007.

Shiver Records released a remastered version of Scent of a Dream in April 2008. This re-release included a bonus acoustic live version of the song "Years of Silence".

Thurisaz signed with Sleaszy Rider Records starting with their third studio album The Cimmerian Years, released in May 2011. The title is a reference to the "dark period" the band had while developing the album, during which they were disrupted by changing their bassist (following the departure of Lars Vereecke in 2009, after having had a stable line-up for over ten years) and suffering from "writer's block", but the band sees the release of the album as an end to those years. The album contains stronger doom metal elements, possibly influenced by Thurisaz's tours with Novembers Doom, Saturnus, Agalloch, and Mar de Grises. It also includes guest vocals by Paul Kuhr (of Novembers Doom) and Thomas A.G. Jensen (of Saturnus). The album art was created by Dutch artist Geert van Mook, who was chosen after Thurisaz was introduced to his work by members of Mar de Grises.

Thurisaz accompanied Oceans of Sadness on their farewell tour in 2011. In 2012 and 2013 respectively, Thurisaz had the opportunity to hold concerts in India and Turkey.

On March 1, 2014, Thurisaz performed a concert in their hometown in Wervik, accompanied by a string quartet and vocals by Els Blieck, with former Thurisaz member Hannes Leroy filling in on bass. The concert focused on Thurisaz's "softer" acoustic songs that contain mainly clean singing and "emotional lyrics", and which are not usually performed live along with their "heavier" music. Thurisaz also used the concert as an opportunity to pay homage to other bands that have influenced them: they performed covers of Anathema's "A Natural Disaster", Amorphis's "My Kantele", and Woods Of Ypres's "Finality". This sold-out concert was recorded, originally as a souvenir for the band, but later released as a CD/DVD Live & Acoustic on January 30, 2015.

On March 5, 2015, Thurisaz released a single, "Patterns Of Life" via their YouTube channel. It was the first song written for their next album, and the song was a work-in-progress for two years before being finalized.

Thurisaz's fourth full-length studio album, The Pulse of Mourning, was released on March 31, 2015. The band considered it both a "logical next step" from The Cimmerian Years and also a return to the "aggressive style and sound" of Circadian Rhythm. The title of the album was inspired by the poem "On the Pulse of Morning" by Maya Angelou and conveys how the album's "songs have a depressive feel over them (mourning), but also a certain drive (a pulse)." The cover artwork was created by the band's Mattias Theuwen and uses photography by Jeroen Mylle (of Amenra). Mylle also directed and filmed the official music video for "One Final Step" from the album.

On September 1, 2020, Thurisaz self-released their fifth full-length album, Re-Incentive, which focuses on themes of "depression and heartbreak".

On June 9, 2024, the band announced they would be parting ways and ending their live performances due to the band members' desire to work on new, individual projects. They would, however, still play their two announced concert dates in Belgium as well as a farewell tour in Turkey. Their final concert took place on December 6, 2024, in The Wild Western in Kortrijk, Belgium. Mattias Theuwen now plays in the post-metal band Ka'Una.

== Band members ==
All members of Thurisaz were involved in writing the lyrics of their songs. While Peter and Mattias Theuwen were the primary musical composers, each song was a "band effort"; every member of Thurisaz contributed ideas, had a say, and eventually agreed on each note. If anyone in the band was not satisfied with a song, it was not included in the album.

- Peter Theuwen − grunts, clean voice, guitar (1997–2024)
- Mattias Theuwen − screams, guitar, vocals (1997–2024)
- Pepijn De Raeymaecker − drums, whispers (1997–2024)
- Kobe Cannière − keyboards, clean voice (1999–2024)
- Hannes Leroy − bass, screams (2009–2012; 2018–2024)
- Lars Vereecke − bass (1997–2009)
- Bjorn "Bud" Vandewalle − bass (2013–2014)
- Nick Meganck − bass (2014–2018)

== Discography ==
=== Albums ===
- Scent of a Dream (2004, self-released; re-released in 2008 through Shiver Records)
- Circadian Rhythm (2007, released through Shiver Records)
- The Cimmerian Years (2011, released through Sleaszy Rider Records)
- The Pulse Of Mourning (2015, released through Sleaszy Rider Records)
- Re-Incentive (2020, self-released)

=== Demos ===
- Never To Return (1998, under the name ModiliuM)
- The Last Embrace (1999, under the name ModiliuM)
- Anno Viroviacum (2002)

=== Live albums ===
- Thurisaz: Live & Acoustic (2015, released through Sleaszy Rider Records)

=== Singles ===
- Patterns Of Life (2015)
