= Sampo Marjomaa =

Finnish presenter, scriptwriter (born 1976)

- Born: 1976 (age 49–50); Oulu, Finland
- Education: Turku University of Applied Sciences
- Occupations: Television presenter, entertainer

Sampo Marjomaa (born 1976) is a Finnish television personality and entertainer.

== Biography ==
He was born in Oulu and was one of the first announcers on the television channel Nelonen. He studied film at the Turku University of Applied Sciences.

== Career ==
Marjomaa was the host and writer of the show Hauskat kotivideot, which uses clips from America's Funniest Home Videos. His time presenting the programme was abruptly ended, and he has said he is unhappy with the way this was handled. He has spoken about the importance of the programme, and comedy in general, to people who are dealing with difficulties in their lives.

Marjomaa has worked as a host on the Nelonen show Tosi-TV and can be seen in films by the Findie film group Acid Cinema. He appeared in a music video for the band Radiopuhelimet.

Marjomaa has spoken in favour of animal rights. He is an advocate for Finnish culture and has used the Kalevala in his work.

He is in a band, Dark Country. He has also performed burlesque.

== Filmography ==
- The Jolly Scoundrel (2007) – actor, camera
- The Animal Within (2007) – director, writer, filming (with JP Manninen)
- Elämäni statistina (1999) – filming
- Rakas Lara (1999) – lighting assistant
- Kura (1998) – directing, writing
- Steak (1998) – actor
- Fetus – directing, writing, editing
