= Paradise Belongs to You =

Studio album by Saturnus
- Released: January 1997
- Recorded: March–August 1996
- Studio: Soundscape Studio
- Genre: Death-doom; death metal
- Length: 67:50
- Producer: Aage Nipper, Saturnus

Saturnus chronology
Paradise Belongs to You (1997)	Martyre (2000)

Paradise Belongs to You is the first album released by doom metal band Saturnus.

== Track listing ==
- Lyrics by Mikkel Andersen and Saturnus (except whispered lyrics on "The Underworld" by William Blake). Music by Saturnus.
1. "Paradise Belongs to You" - 10:16
2. "Christ Goodbye" - 8:10
3. "As We Dance the Path of Fire or Solace" - 1:41
4. "Pilgrimage of Sorrow" - 9:16
5. "The Fall of Nakkiel" - 5:05
6. "Astral Dawn" - 7:53
7. "I Love Thee" - 8:33
8. "The Underworld" - 9:26
9. "Lament for this Treacherous World" (4-minute silence from 3:20 to 7:20, then 10-second hidden track) - 7:30

== Personnel ==
=== Saturnus ===
- Thomas A.G. Jensen: Vocals
- Kim Larsen: Acoustic and electric guitars
- Anders Ro Nielsen: Keyboards
- Brian Hansen: Bass
- Jesper Saltoft: Drums, percussion, additional keyboards

=== Additional Personnel ===
- Troels L.: Flute on "The Fall of Nakkiel (Nakkiel Has Fallen)"
- Christina Arvedlund, Mikkel Andersen: Whispered vocals on "The Fall of Nakkiel (Nakkiel Has Fallen)" and "The Underworld"
