= Designs for Automotion =

Studio album by Snapcase
- Released: January 25, 2000
- Recorded: 1999
- Genre: Hardcore punk; heavy metal; emocore
- Length: 30:45
- Label: Victory
- Producer: Steve Evetts

Snapcase chronology
Progression Through Unlearning (1997)	Designs for Automotion (2000)	End Transmission (2002)

Professional ratings
Review scores
Source	Rating
AllMusic	3/5 stars
Sputnikmusic	3.9/5

Designs for Automotion is the third studio album by American hardcore punk band Snapcase. The album was released on January 25, 2000, through Victory Records. It shows the band distancing from their earlier metalcore style for more of a "balls-out rock" sound compared to Fugazi, which has spawned mildly positive reviews from critics and criticism from fans.

A music video was released for the song "Typecast Modulator".

== Track listing ==
All tracks are written by Snapcase.

Designs for Automotion track listing
No.	Title	Length
1.	"Target"	2:20
2.	"Disconnector"	3:00
3.	"Bleeding Orange"	3:15
4.	"Typecast Modulator"	2:41
5.	"Are You Tuned In?"	2:26
6.	"Twentieth Nervous Breakdown"	2:54
7.	"Energy Dome"	2:32
8.	"Ambition Now"	3:41
9.	"Break the Static"	2:44
10.	"Blemish"	2:22
11.	"Box Seat"	2:50
Total length:		30:45

== Personnel ==
Snapcase

- Daryl Taberski – vocals
- Frank Vicario – guitar
- Jon Salemi – guitar
- Dustin Perry – bass
- Timothy Redmond – drums

Production

- Steve Evetts – producer
- Alan Douches – mastering
