= Severe Torture =

Dutch death metal band

- Origin: Boxtel, Netherlands
- Genre: Brutal death metal
- Years active: 1997–present
- Labels: Season of Mist, Earache, Karmageddon
- Members: Dennis Schreurs; Thijs van Laarhoven; Patrick Boleij; Damiën Kerpentier; Marvin Vriesde
- Past members: Eric de Windt; Jelle Schuurmans; Seth van de Loo
- Website: www.severetorture.com

Severe Torture is a Dutch brutal death metal band formed in 1997 by drummer Seth van de Loo, bassist Patrick Boleij, and guitarist Thijs van Laarhoven.

== History ==
Guitarist Thijs van Laarhoven, drummer Seth van de Loo, singer Erik de Windt, guitarist Jelle Schuurmans, and bassist Patrick Boleij formed the band in 1997. This lineup recorded the five-song demo tape Baptized in Virginal Liquid, produced by Vincent Dijkers, (Sinister, Houwitser), in 1998, which eventually sold 600 copies all over the world. After releasing the demo, de Windt left the group to join Dutch death metal band Sinister. He was replaced with Dennis Schreurs. This new line-up recorded a two-song demo for record labels. After receiving positive reactions, the played a show with Immolation. Schuurmans left the group soon afterwards.

The band continued with four members, and signed a one-album deal with Fadeless Records. They appeared at the No Mercy 2000 festival in Tilburg, and embarked on their first tour, nine days across the Czech Republic, Slovakia, Germany, Belgium, and the Netherlands with Damnation, and the last three shows with Pyaemia.

After this tour, they recorded their full-length debut, Feasting On Blood, at Franky's Recording Kitchen with producers Berthus Westerhuys and Robbie Woning. The artwork for the album was done by Joe Maloney. The album was released in October 2000 in Europe, and received American distribution through Hammerheart America in February 2001. To promote the album, Severe Torture embarked on a European tour in January 2001 with Macabre, Broken Hope, and Die Apokalyptischen Reiter, a tour called "Masters of Murder 2001." In February 2001, The Plague Records changed into Hammerheart Records and offered Severe Torture a contract for another full-length album and an option for two more. In April, Severe Torture played in the United States, at the Ohio Death Fest (with Exhumed, Deeds of Flesh, and others), and two shows with Pessimist and Burial.

After this U.S. trip, Severe Torture started writing their next album, recorded at Franky's Recording Kitchen with Berthus Westerhuys and Robbie Woning. The recordings were finished in March 2002, and right after, Severe Torture went to the U.S. for a second time. They were on the "Bloodletting North America Part III" tour, the New England Metal and Hardcore Fest, and again at the Ohio Death Fest, and played five shows in Canada. During a five-week European tour with Cannibal Corpse in the fall, Severe Torture met guitarist Marvin Vriesde, who played session guitar for German metal band Dew-Scented and guitar in Dutch metal band Blo.Torch. A few months after the tour, he was asked to join Severe Torture as second guitar player, which he did in the spring of 2003.

In 2005, the band signed a deal with Earache Records. A new album, Fall of the Despised, was released in Autumn of 2005. In May 2006, Severe Torture visited the U.S. for the third time, playing at the Maryland Deathfest, and that summer, they toured Europe (40 shows) with Vader.

In 2007, they released Sworn Vengeance, their fourth studio album.

In 2010 they signed with Season of Mist and released their fifth album, Slaughtered.

In 2017, drummer Seth van de Loo left the band, and Damiën Kerpentier replaced him in early 2018.

In April 2022, Severe Torture released their first song in twelve years, "Fisting the Sockets", the title track from an EP released on June 10. The band planned to release a full-length album, their first in thirteen years, in 2023.

== Members ==
=== Current members ===
- Dennis Schreurs – vocals (1999–present)
- Thijs van Laarhoven – rhythm guitar (1997–present)
- Patrick Boleij – bass (1997–present)
- Marvin Vriesde – lead guitar (2003–present)
- Damiën Kerpentier – drums (2018–present)

=== Former members ===
- Eric de Windt – vocals (1997–1998)
- Jelle Schuurmans – guitar (1997–1999)
- Seth van de Loo – drums (1997-2017)

== Discography ==
- Feasting on Blood (2000)
- Misanthropic Carnage (2002)
- Fall of the Despised (2005)
- Sworn Vengeance (2007)
- Slaughtered (2010)
- Torn from the Jaws of Death (2024)
