= Stijn Van Cauter =

Belgian metal musician

- Also known as: Until Death Overtakes Me
- Origin: Belgium
- Genres: Drone music; funeral doom metal; ambient; experimental; minimalism
- Label: Nulll
- Website: svc.nulll-void.com

Stijn Van Cauter (Dutch pronunciation: [ˈstɛiɱ vɑŋ ˈkʌutər]) (Note: Stijn and Van in isolation: [stɛin] and [vɑn].) is a Belgian doom metal and ambient music musician. He has several solo projects, including Beyond Black Void, I Dream No More, and Fall of the Grey-Winged One. His most notable solo project is Until Death Overtakes Me.

== Music career ==
=== 1997-2001 ===
Van Cauter had been experimenting with music production since 1997. In May 1999, he founded the doom metal project Macabre Destiny. He decided to change the name of the project to Until Death Overtakes Me in February 2000. Three new members, "EDS", Jo Renette, and "PT", joined the project that same year, transforming it into a band.

In 2001, Van Cauter began recording the demo Deep Dark Red by himself. He decided to abandon the use of drums and started using timpani instead. The demo was not released because it had involved earlier material drafted by Van Cauter alone, and he thought it would not represent the band properly. While recording the second demo, Absence of Life, "EDS" and "PT" left the band. Renette also left the band after the recording was complete.

=== 2002-present ===
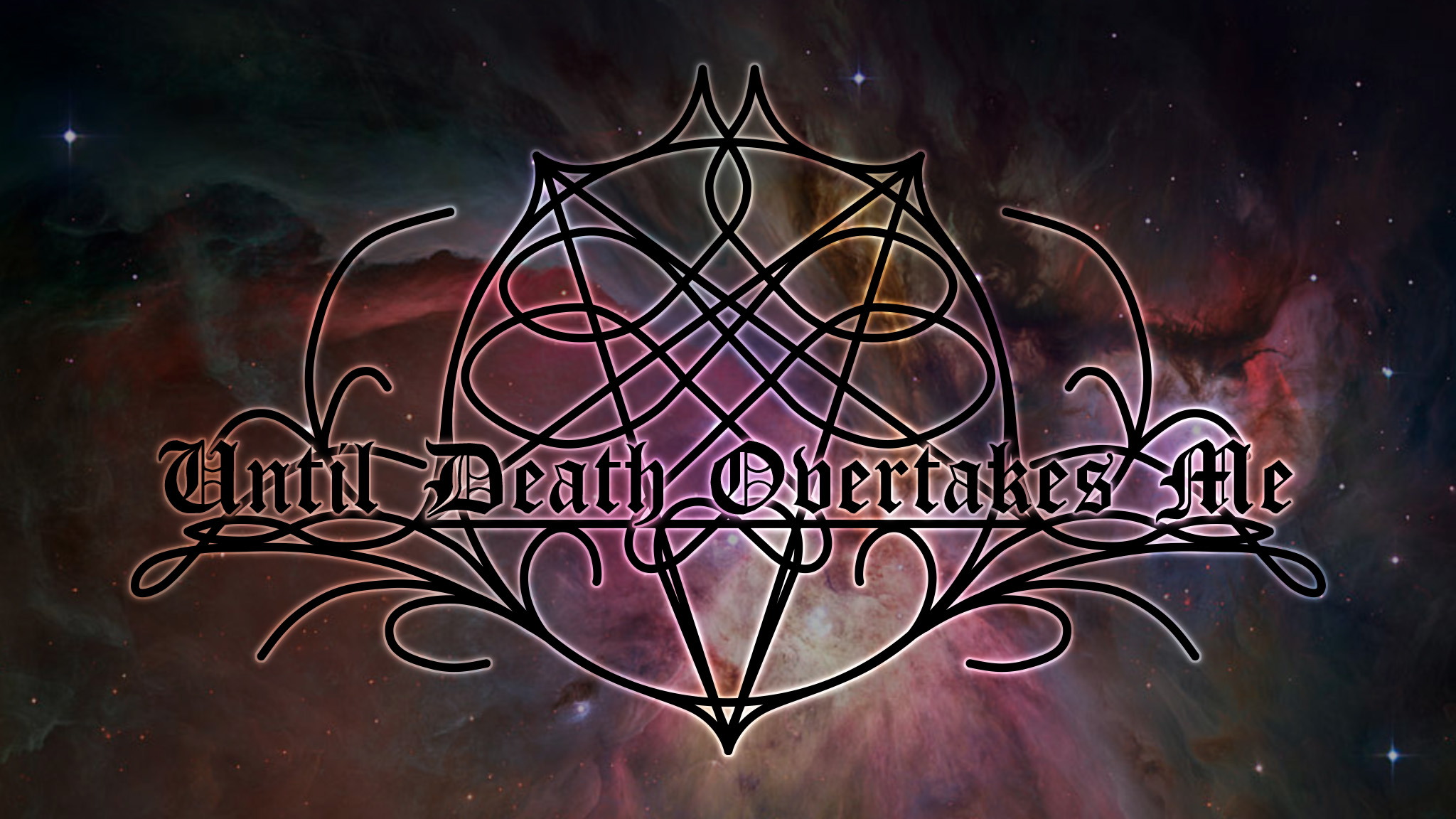

With the departure of all other band members, Van Cauter decided to transform Until Death Overtakes Me into a solo project once again. He released his first album, Symphony I: Deep Dark Red, in February 2002. Shortly after that, Van Cauter began exploring other musical genres and emerged with new solo projects. He then founded the one-man project I Dream No More.

Van Cauter says he discovered the drone doom genre while working on his first album for I Dream No More, called Fade - Die, which was released in April 2002. He experimented with making heavy drone sounds on a bass guitar. As a result, he started yet another solo project, called Fall of the Grey-Winged One. In June 2002 he released the album Aeons of Dreams. Van Cauter describes the album as "drone sound with some ambient and industrial elements." Around May of that year, Van Cauter dropped out of school. The excess free time allowed him to concentrate on his music, and as a result he founded three more solo projects: The Ethereal, Organium and Dreams of Dying Stars.

In January 2003, he released the first album, Desolate, under Beyond Black Void. In the summer of that year Van Cauter joined the doom metal band Pantheist, as a live musician. He remained in the band for the next 10 months, during which he has toured with it, on one occasion alongside funeral doom pioneers Skepticism. He was also asked to record the vocals for one track in Pantheist's debut album.

In May 2003, Van Cauter founded a small record label, called NULLL Records.

He started two more projects, Tear Your Soul Apart - intent on experimenting more with ambient and noise sounds, and the more drone-focused In The Mist. Van Cauter says that the album Lost, released under In The Mist, is one of his most favourite works.

=== Influences ===
Van Cauter says that he has a rather grim worldview. According to his website, his music is influenced by his own way of life, his dreams, feelings, and a striving to honor true music.

== Personal life ==
Van Cauter enjoys graphic design and is the owner and founder of the record label NULLL Records.

== Discography ==
Stijn Van Cauter has several solo projects. His discography is listed here per project.

=== Aeonic Dirge ===
- 2017: Beta Crucis
- 2017: Sigma Lunaris
- 2019: Markab Sinistris
- 2021: Dreamer of Stars
- 2023: Rift Spirits

=== Arcane Voidsplitter ===
- 2017: To Reach Beyond
- 2019: Voice of the Stars
- 2020: Cosmic Mind
- 2022: Cold Stars

=== Artix Intex ===
- 2018: Aberrancis'

=== Bateaux Inconnus ===
- 2018: Slow Rivers
- 2022: Seas and Mirrors

=== Beyond Black Void ===
- 2003: Desolate
- 2010: Eridanus Supervoid
- 2011: Neyon Moru
- 2019: Voidgaze
- 2021: Wraith Crack

=== Catnoms For Fluffy ===
- 2017: Flight
- 2018: Vast
- 2020: Moon

=== Cold Aeon ===
- 2008: Infra Sub Ultra
- 2021: Frostverse

=== Desperandum Gothica ===
- 2017: I
- 2018: II
- 2022: III

=== Dreams of Dying Stars ===
- 2003: Stardance
- 2004: Interludium II - Aeon E
- 2004: Funeral in the Void
- 2005: Interludium V - Buried in the Void

=== Ekket-Faug ===
- 2022: Reaching Lichdom Supreme

=== Fall of the Grey-Winged One ===
- 2002: Aeons of Dreams
- 2003: Death Time Emptiness
- 2004: Interludium III - Inritus
- 2009: Channelers
- 2020: Propagating Drone Fields
- 2020: The Hive
- 2021: Propagating Drone Fields

=== Forbidden Fields ===
- 2003: Field I: Night
- 2009: Field II: of Trees...
- 2020: Field III: New Voyages
- 2021: Field IV: The Mystic

=== Gruulvoqh ===
- 2018: The End of Gruulvoqh
- 2019: The Eternal Traveller
- 2021: Dreams of the Savant

=== I Dream No More ===
- 2000: Until Death Overtakes Me/I Dream No More
- 2002: Fade – Die
- 2009: I Dream No More/Dios Incandescente
- 2010: La Ultima Frontera
- 2020: The Final Border
- 2022: The Citadel Fleets of Ekket-Faug

=== In Somnis ===
- 2003: The Memory You’ve Become

=== In the Mist ===
- 2002: Lost
- 2018: A Return to the Mist

=== Inframonolithium ===
- 2017: Demo I: Laments
- 2018: Mysterium
- 2019: The Lightless

=== Nachtwald Weitstrider ===
- 2017: Sternwald
- 2018: Wächter des Waldes
- 2020: Forests of the Old World
- 2022: The Wizard’s Path

=== Organium ===
- 2006: The Rage
- 2007: Interludium IV - Levitation

=== Tear Your Soul Apart ===
- 2002: Undigested Remains
- 2003: In Pain

=== The Ethereal ===
- 2002: From Funeral Skies
- 2008: Infra Sub Ultra
- 2010: Endlight

=== The Nulll Collective ===
- 2009: Silent Night
- 2010: Exocation
- 2010: RepulsUgloid
- 2010: De Monstris
- 2010: Cerberus Trisector
- 2010: Jingle Bells
- 2022: Cerberus Tirsector

=== The Sad Sun ===
- 2004: Church of the Flagellation
- 2008: Infra Sub Ultra
- 2009: The Sad Sun

=== The Sonitus Ignotus Ensemble ===
- 2017: Christmas Though and Dreams

=== Until Death Overtakes Me ===
- 2000: Until Death Overtakes Me / I Dream No More
- 2001: Symphony I - Deep Dark Red
- 2001: Symphony II - Absence of Life
- 2002: Symphony I - Deep Dark Red
- 2003: Prelude to Monolith
- 2004: Interludium I - Funeral Path
- 2006: Symphony III - Monolith
- 2009: Days Without Hope
- 2016: Well of Dreams
- 2016: Antemortem
- 2017: Hell & Rain
- 2017: Flow of Infinity
- 2018: They Know
- 2018: Missing
- 2019: Herald of Sorrow
- 2020: And Be No More
- 2021: As Dead as Time
- 2022: Collapse of Light
- 2023: Decay Into Irrelevance
- 2024: Diagenesis
- 2025: Hurt Lock
