= Snapcase =

American hardcore punk band

- Also known as: Solid State (1989–1991)
- Origin: Buffalo, New York, U.S.
- Genres: Hardcore punk; metalcore; post-hardcore; alternative metal; heavy metal; emocore
- Years active: 1989–2005, 2007, 2010–present
- Label: Victory Records
- Members: Daryl Taberski; Jon Salemi; Frank Vicario; Dustin Perry; Timothy Redmond
- Past members: Chris Galas; Scott Dressler; Joe Smith; Mike Kimaid; Bob Whiteside; Ben Lythberg; Peter Dawidzik; Tiger Balduf; Jason Kourkounis
- Website: snapcase.com

Snapcase is an American hardcore punk band from Buffalo, New York. Their records were released on the Chicago record label Victory Records. During the course of the band's initial run of fourteen years, they released five studio albums before disbanding in 2005.

== Background ==
=== Formation ===
The band was originally conceived in 1989 in a basement in West Seneca, New York, and was named Solid State. In 1989, the lineup was guitarist Scott Dressler, then 15 years of age, 17-year-old drummer Mike Kimaid, Daryl Taberski, age 18 on bass, and Tiger Balduf, the eldest at 19 on vocals. Prior to recording their first demo as Solid State on January 30, 1990, Quest for Reality, Tiger Balduf left the band to get married, and Mike Kimaid left to join the Lockport, New York-based band The Watchmen . Drafted to take their places were Chris Galas on vocals and Peter Dawidzik on drums. Soon after recording, Peter Dawidzik left the band to go to school. On May 22, 1990, Solid State recorded their second demo, Accept Your Fate, with their friend Mike Lampe, who had assisted with the previous demo, as well. At the time of recording, the band was composed of Chris Galas on vocals, Scott Dressler playing guitar, Jason Kourkounis on drums, and Daryl Taberski on bass.

During the spring of 1991, Solid State went through a big lineup shift; Kourkounis left the band to pursue other musical interests, and Kimaid rejoined the band along with The Watchmen guitarist Joe Smith, making the band a five-piece. After these changes to their lineup, the band decided to change their name to Snapcase. Between the years of 1991 and 1992, Snapcase recorded two demos with Dennis Fura, Break The Silence and King of the Mountain. In 1992 the band was signed to Chicago hardcore label Victory Records and recorded their first 7 inch, Comatose, with Mike Sac and Robby Takac that year.

There was a line-up change following the release date of the single; Taberski moved over to vocals, replacing Chris Galas, Bob Whiteside from Buffalo, New York band Support took over on bass, and Jon Salemi, who played drums in Support, joined to replace Joe Smith, who left for school. In 1993, Kimaid left the band after partially recording the band's first album and was replaced by former Buffalo, New York-based Slugfest drummer, Timothy Redmond, who performed on the rest of the tracks. Snapcase's first full-length recording, Lookinglasself, was released in 1993 and was recorded with Don Fury and Fred Betschen.

In early 1995, the band released the Steps EP, which they recorded with Fred Betschen. This was the last recording to feature Scott Dressler, who left the band in the fall of 1995 to go to graduate school. He was replaced by Frank Vicario of Buffalo, New York band Fadeaway. In the summer of 1996, The California Takeover was released which featured live recordings from Snapcase, Earth Crisis, and Strife.

=== Progression Through Unlearning and Designs for Automotion ===
Progression Through Unlearning was recorded and mixed in a period of two weeks with producer Steve Evetts at Trax East in New Jersey. Guitarist Jon Salemi recorded the album with "full-blown chicken pox" and noted that the album's recording was "very, very quick." The album was released in April 1997.

The band set out on a summer tour, and featured performances on the Vans Warped Tour. One of the album's tracks, "Breaking and Reaching", was used by Cartoon Network's Toonami for promos of Mobile Fighter G Gundam in 2002. In the fall of 1997, the band took some time off so that members could pursue education. In 1998, the band resumed touring, and was the opening band on the fall tour of the Deftones and Quicksand. They also went into the studio with Brian McTernan in the fall of 1998 to record a cover of the Bad Brains "I", released on Century Media's Never Give In tribute record, and a split EP with Boysetsfire that was released in the summer of 1999. These were the last recordings with bassist Bob Whiteside. He was replaced by Dustin Perry, formerly of the Minnesota band Threadbare. They headlined Hellfest that summer in Syracuse, New York.

Designs for Automotion, the band's third full-length album, was recorded in the summer of 1999 with Steve Evetts was released in January 2000. They spent most of 2000 on tour, performing on the Deconstruction tour in Europe with NOFX and playing the main stage of the Vans Warped Tour in the summer. Ben Lythberg began playing drums for the band during the fall, winter and spring while Redmond finished his master's degree.

=== End Transmission and Bright Flashes ===
In 2002, the band focused their creative energy on crafting their new album, End Transmission, with Brian McTernan at Salad Days Studios. The result became their fourth full-length album, which was released in September 2002. Redmond officially left the band soon after the release of the album and was permanently replaced by Lythberg. Snapcase toured that fall with Boysetsfire and Atreyu. Their final international tour was in early 2003. They opened for Bad Religion and Finch in the spring of 2003. Bright Flashes was released in November 2003. Featuring songs that were recorded for the conceptual End Transmission album, it also included covers of songs by Helmet, Devo, and Jane's Addiction, and three remixes of songs from End Transmission.

=== Final concert and subsequent activities ===
The band announced in November 2004 that they would be disbanding, and played their final show in January 2005 in Buffalo, New York. The final show featured appearances by nearly every member who had ever played in the band. Redmond, Dressler, and Whiteside joined Salemi and Taberski for a performance of the song "Lookinglasself", and original vocalist Chris Galas joined them for the song "Comatose".

Most of the band members of Snapcase found jobs after disbanding. Timothy Redmond taught AP Government, Global History, The Turbulent Sixties, and Human Rights and Genocide at Williamsville East High School and Scott Dressler was an Assistant Professor of Economics at Villanova University. After Snapcase dissolved, Vicario, Perry and Lythberg briefly participated in the band Attractive with Josh English from the band Sixgoingonseven. Vicario was working on new projects, but he primarily focused on his job in the technology industry.

=== Reunion shows ===
Snapcase reunited briefly in late 2007 on November 20 at Mohawk Place in their hometown of Buffalo, New York, and on November 24 and 25 at the Music Hall of Williamsburg in Brooklyn. The reunion shows were performed for the benefit of Callum Robbins and the release of the Anti-Matter Anthology book release.

In early 2010, Snapcase confirmed to play a series of shows in Europe including a performance at the 2010 Groezrock Festival in Belgium and also confirmed a reunion show with Sick of It All in Buffalo, New York, for May 8, 2010. Guitarist Frank Vicario later stated that the band had no intention of doing an extended reunion beyond the European and Buffalo, New York, shows.

Snapcase was later forced to cancel their previously announced European reunion shows due to the eruption of Icelandic volcano Eyjafjallajökull and its resulting ash plume engulfing much of Europe's airspace. The band remarked on their Twitter account that it could be at least three weeks before they'd be able to book different flights. The band still performed in their hometown of Buffalo, New York, on May 8. European dates had been rescheduled for July 2010. Snapcase performed at Fun Fun Fun Fest 2010 in Austin, Texas and played day four of Riot Fest 2010 in Chicago at the Congress Theater.

Sick of It All announced that Snapcase would be supporting them at their 25th Anniversary show at New York City's Webster Hall on March 26, 2011.

On June 12, 2012, Snapcase announced that they have booked a September 14 show at the Outer Harbor in Buffalo, New York, with Dropkick Murphys.

On July 23, 2015, Snapcase played the tenth annual This Is Hardcore Festival at Union Transfer in Philadelphia.

On February 26, 2016, Snapcase played a 25th anniversary show at the Town Ballroom in Buffalo.

On May 27, 2025, Snapcase released a cover of the Zero Tolerance song "Back to Square One" for the Iodine Recordings charity compilation The Dogs of Hope.

== Members ==
Current members

- Daryl Taberski – vocals (1992–2005, 2007, 2010–present); bass (1989–1992)
- Jon Salemi – guitar (1992–2005, 2007, 2010–present)
- Frank Vicario – guitar (1995–2005, 2007, 2010–present)
- Dustin Perry – bass (1999–2005, 2007, 2010–present)
- Timothy Redmond – drums (1993–2002, 2005 invited, 2007, 2010–present)

Former members

- Tiger Balduf – vocals (1989–1990)
- Chris Galas – vocals (1990–1992, 2005 invited)
- Scott Dressler – guitar (1989–1995, 2005 invited)
- Joe Smith – guitar (1991–1992)
- Bob Whiteside – bass (1992–1999, 2005 invited)
- Mike Kimaid – drums (1989–1990, 1991–1993)
- Peter Dawidzik – drums (1990)
- Jason Kourkounis – drums (1990–1991)
- Ben Lythberg – drums (2000 touring, 2002–2005)

== Discography ==
=== Studio albums ===
- Lookinglasself (1993)
- Progression Through Unlearning (1997)
- Designs for Automotion (2000)
- End Transmission (2002)
- Bright Flashes (2003)

=== Extended plays ===
- Snapcase (1991)
- Steps (1995)

=== Singles ===
- "Comatose" (1992)
- "Cognition/Steps", with Doughnuts (1995)
- "Energy Dome/Truth Hits Everybody", with BoySetsFire (1999)
- "Energy Dome" (2000)
- "Coagulate" (2002)

=== Demos ===
- Quest for Reality (1990)
- Accept Your Fate (1990)
- Break the Silence (1991)
- King of the Mountain (1992)

=== Compilations ===
- The California Takeover, with Earth Crisis and Strife (1996)
- The Return of the California Takeover, with Earth Crisis and Strife (2021)

=== Appearances ===
- Only the Strong MCMXCII (1993) "Fields of Illusion"
- Anti-Matter (1995) "Vent"
- Reason for Living (1996) "Caboose"
- Violent World – A Tribute to the Misfits (1997) "She"
- Never Give In – A Tribute to Bad Brains (1998) "I"
- No Borders (1999) "Box Seat"
- To the Bone (1999) "Typecast Modulator"
- Xtreme Rock: Music That Changed Our Lives (1999) "Caboose"
- Incompatible Vol. 3 (2000) "Ambition Now"
- For Those Who Stand (2001) "Break the Static"
- And Now I'm Just Gnashing My Teeth (2024) "Far Out, Bro"
- The Shape of Punk to Come Obliterated (2024) "Summer Holidays vs. Punkroutine"

== Videography ==
| Year | Song | Album |
|---|---|---|
| 1995 | "Cognition" | Steps |
| 1997 | "Caboose" | Progression Through Unlearning |
| 1999 | "Typecast Modulator" | Designs for Automation |
| 2002 | "Coagulate" | End Transmission |
| 2002 | "A Synthesis of Classic Forms" | End Transmission |
