= Firebox Records =

Finnish record label

- Founded: April 2001
- Founder: Rami Hippi
- Distributor: Various
- Genre: Doom metal Death metal Gothic metal Black metal Rock; Heavy metal Ambient
- Country of origin: Finland
- Official website: firebox.fi

Firebox Records was a Finnish record label based in Seinäjoki, Southern Ostrobothnia. They specialized in doom metal.

Firedoom Music was a subsidiary label of Firebox Records specializing in more extreme doom metal and other obscure genres. The Firebox label has a distribution network for its releases worldwide including Plastic Head Distribution in England, SPV in Germany, Bertus in Benelux, and The End Records in North America.

== Artists ==
=== Firebox Records ===
- Dark the Suns
- Dauntless
- Depressed Mode
- The Eternal
- Fall of the Leafe
- Grave Flowers
- Grendel
- Jääportit
- Manitou
- Mar de Grises
- Misery Inc.
- SaraLee
- Saturnus
- Scent of Flesh
- ShamRain
- Spiritus Mortis
- Throes of Dawn
- Total Devastation
- Velvetcut
- Wasara
- Wraith of the ropes

=== Firedoom Music ===
- Aarni
- Ablaze in Hatred
- DOOM:VS
- Forest of Shadows
- Mar de Grises
- My Shameful
- Pantheïst
- Torture Wheel
- Tyranny
- Umbra Nihil
- Until Death Overtakes Me
- Woods of Belial
