= Finnvox Studios =

Recording studio located in Helsinki, Finland

Coordinates: 60°13′16″N 24°51′4″E

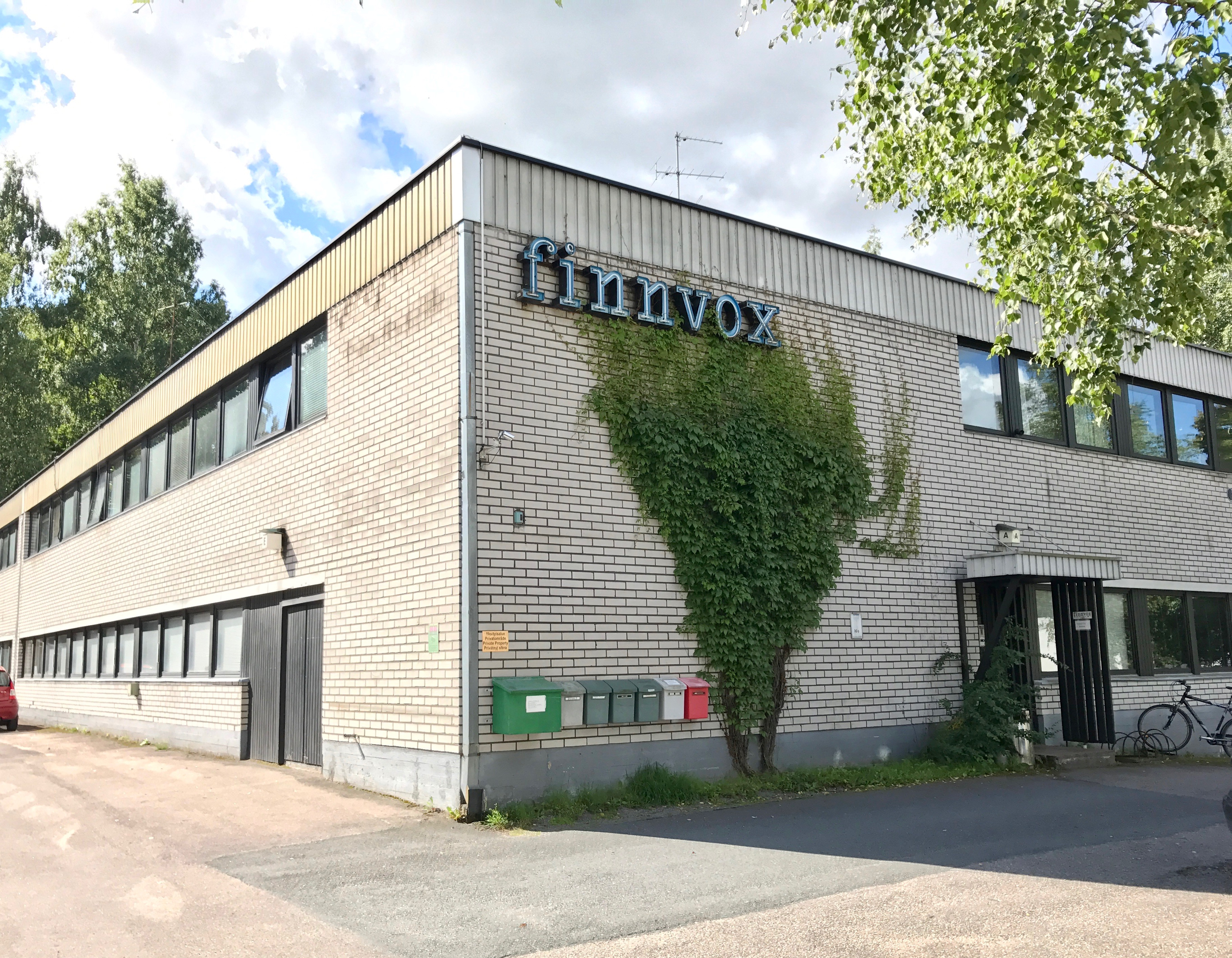
- Founded: 1965
- Genre: all
- Country of origin: Finland
- Location: Pitäjänmäki, Helsinki, Finland
- Official website: finnvox.fi

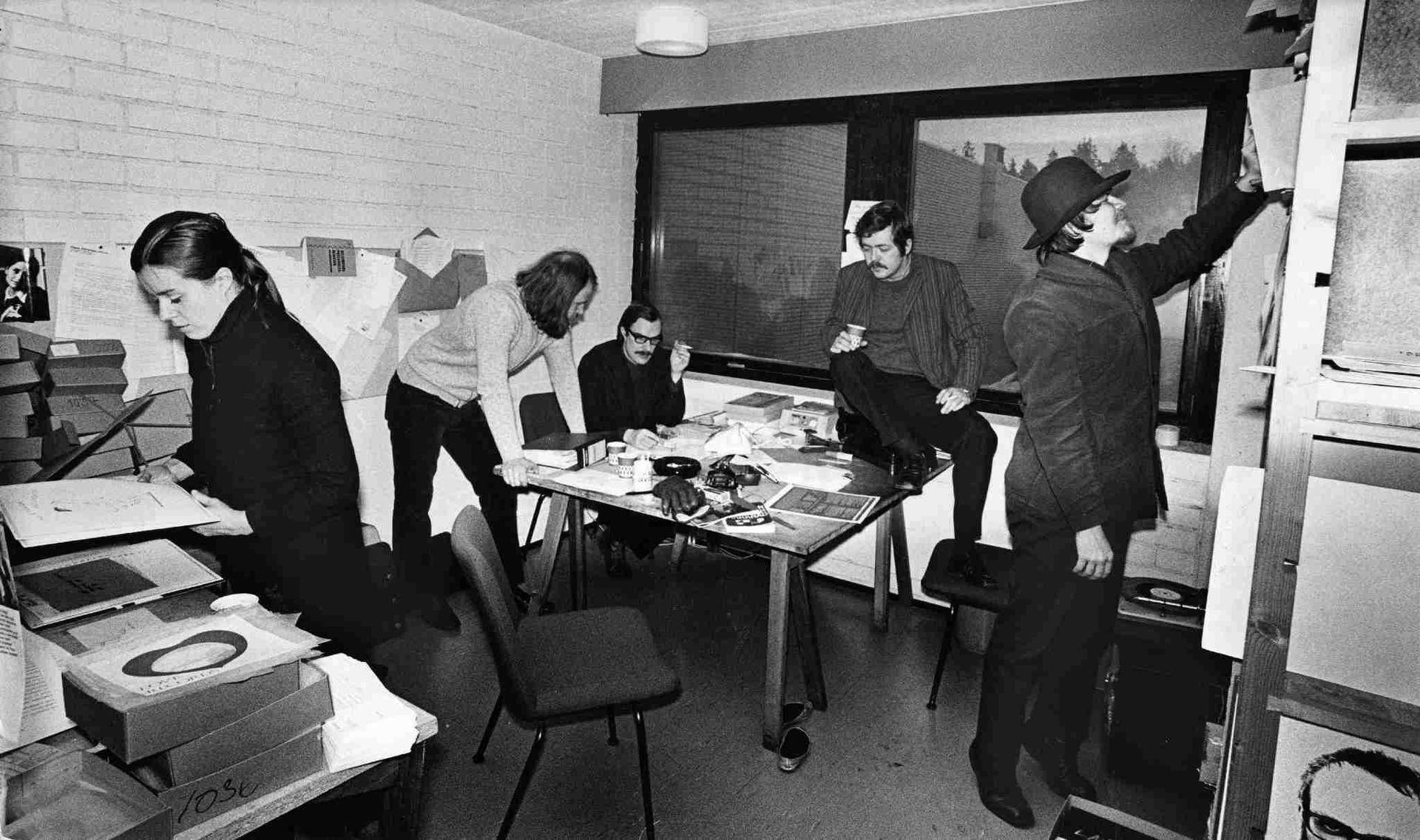

Finnvox Studios is a recording studio located in Pitäjänmäki, Helsinki, Finland. It was founded by Erkki Ertesuo, Kurt Juuranto and Lejos Inc. in 1965 and is the longest running studio recording facility in Finland. The original multi-track recording equipment and continuous technical updates of the studio machines and acoustics soon made Finnvox the most sought after studio in the country. Finnish artists that recorded at Finnvox in the 1970s include Rauli Somerjoki, M. A. Numminen and their bands, Wigwam, Agit-prop and many others. Up until the 1990s, Finnvox also operated a vinyl record mastering and pressing facility, which was later converted to new studio rooms and a mixing and recording room for film and TV productions. Currently, Finnvox occupy 2000 square feet and has nine studio rooms, five of which are used for recording and mixing, three for mastering and editing and one for film and TV productions.

Many metal bands have used Finnvox Studios for recording, mixing or mastering their albums including Sonata Arctica, Nightwish, Lordi, Finntroll, Stratovarius, HIM, Moonsorrow, Holy Knights, Ram-Zet, Throes of Dawn, Grenouer, Apocalyptica and many more. The mastering abilities of technician Mika Jussila in particular are much requested in the metal community, with more than 1300 metal albums mastered at Finnvox since 1990.
