= Feasting on Blood =

Studio album by Severe Torture
- Released: October 9, 2000
- Recorded: During Spring 2000 at Frankys Recording Kitchen
- Genre: Brutal death metal
- Length: 33:48
- Label: The Plague/Hammerheart Records
- Producer: Berthus Westerhuys, Robbie Woning and Severe Torture

Severe Torture chronology
Feasting on Blood (2000)	Butchery of the Soul (2002)

Feasting on Blood is the debut album by brutal death metal band Severe Torture, released by Hammerheart Records on October 9, 2000.

A digipack version of this album was also released which included two bonus tracks from the Lambs of a God 7 inch EP and a CD-ROM video.

== Track listing ==
1. Feces for Jesus - 03:15
2. Blood - 02:53
3. Decomposing Bitch - 04:49
4. Baptized in Virginal Liquid - 02:37
5. Twist the Cross - 03:26
6. Butchery of the Soul - 03:42
7. Rest in Flames - 03:01
8. Severe Torture - 02:05
9. Pray For Nothing - 03:38
10. Vomiting Christ - 04:22

== Personnel ==
- Dennis Schreurs – vocals
- Thijs van Laarhoven – guitar
- Patrick Boleij – bass
- Seth van de Loo – drums, vocals on "Feces for Jesus"
