= Sworn Vengeance (album) =

Studio album by Severe Torture
- Released: April 2007
- Recorded: 2007
- Studio: Excess Studios
- Genre: Death metal
- Length: 36:00
- Label: Earache Records
- Producer: Hans Pieters, Robbe Kok and Severe Torture

Severe Torture chronology
Fall of the Despised (2005)	Sworn Vengeance (2007)

Sworn Vengeance is the fourth studio album released by death metal band Severe Torture in 2007. It was recorded at Excess Studios in The Netherlands with producers Hans Pieters and Robbe Kok.

AllMusic stated, "the overall result still makes for a very impressive album, recommended to those seeking brutal, take-no-prisoners death metal."

== Track listing ==
Untold track listing
No.	Title	Length
1.	"Dismal Perception"	2:51
2.	"Serenity Torn Asunder"	3:28
3.	"Fight Something"	4:15
4.	"Repeat Offender"	3:21
5.	"Countless Villains"	3:56
6.	"Dogmasomatic Nausea"	2:50
7.	"Redefined Identity"	3:29
8.	"Buried Hatchet"	3:41
9.	"Sworn Vengeance"	5:19
10.	"Submerged in Grief" (Instrumental)	2:52
11.	"It's the Limit" (Originally by Cro‑Mags)	1:50
12.	"Eyemaster" (Originally by Entombed)	3:04
Total length:		40:56

== Personnel ==
- Dennis Schreurs – vocals
- Thijs van Laarhoven – rhythm guitar
- Patrick Boleij – bass
- Seth van de Loo – drums
- Marvin Vriesde – lead guitar
- Ché Snelting (Born From Pain) – guest Vocals on "Buried Hatchet" & "It's The Limit"
- Jason Netherton (Misery Index) – guest Vocals on "Buried Hatchet"
