= Martyre =

Studio album by Saturnus
- Released: January 12, 2000
- Recorded: 1999
- Genre: Death-doom; doom metal; gothic metal
- Length: 63:09
- Producer: Flemming Rasmussen

Saturnus chronology
Paradise Belongs to You (1997)	Martyre (2000)	Veronika Decides to Die (2006)

Professional ratings
Review scores
Source	Rating
Kerrang!	3/5 stars

Martyre is the second full-length album released by doom metal band Saturnus.

== Track listing ==
1. "7" – 1:54
2. "Inflame Thy Heart" – 6:42
3. "Empty Handed" – 4:12
4. "Noir" – 5:33
5. "A Poem (Written In Moonlight)" – 5:41
6. "Softly on the Path You Fade" – 7:07
7. "Thou Art Free" – 4:36
8. "Drown My Sorrow" – 6:50
9. "Lost My Way" – 4:47
10. "Loss (In Memoriam)" – 6:49
11. "Thus My Heart Weepeth for Thee" – 6:12
12. "In Your Shining Eyes" – 2:36
