= Saturnus (band) =

Danish metal band

- Also known as: Asesino (1991–1993)
- Origin: Copenhagen, Denmark
- Genres: Death-doom, gothic metal, doom metal, death metal (early)
- Years active: 1991–present
- Label: Cyclone Empire
- Members: Thomas Akim Grønbæk Jensen; Rune Stiassny; Henrik Glass; Brian Pomy Hansen

Saturnus are a Danish death-doom band.

== History ==
The band was formed in 1991 by vocalist Thomas A.G. Jensen and bassist Brian Hansen, as death metal band Asesino. The band changed their name to Saturnus in 1993, switching to their present sound of melodic death/doom with synthesized touches of gothic metal. Throughout the 90s, Saturnus had recorded and released several demos, an EP, and two albums, Paradise Belongs to You and Martyre. Saturnus released their third full-length album, Veronika Decides to Die, in May 2006. The album title was inspired by Paulo Coelho's novel of the same name. The band toured since the album's 2006 release into 2008 with bands such as Agalloch, Novembers Doom, Mar de Grises, and Thurisaz.

On April 9, 2012, Saturnus posted on their Facebook page:

"Tomorrow we begin recording for the new album 'Saturn in Ascension', with 'Flemming Rasmussen' once again behind the mixer. We are looking forward to this [launching of the album 'Saturn in Ascension']. Bass and drums are the first things that will be recorded over the coming days, we will keep you posted on the development."

On October 10, 2012, Saturnus announced on their Myspace page that the release date for Saturn in Ascension would be November 30, 2012, released via Cyclone Empire records.

In 2020, two new guitarists have been hired and the band is willing to start working on a new album soon. In June 2020, vocalist T Jensen stated that the band was working on some unreleased songs and would be released later that year, however this did not happen due to unforeseen circumstances. In March 2023, it was eventually officially announced that their fifth studio album, titled The Storm Within, would be released on June 16, 2023, marking their longest ever gap between studio albums with it being their first new release in over a decade since 2012's Saturn in Ascension.

== Band members ==
- Thomas Akim Grønbæk Jensen – vocals (1991–present)
- Henrik Glass – drums (2001–2003, 2010–present)
- Brian Pomy Hansen - bass (1991-1999, 2007–present)
- Indee Rehal-Sagoo - lead guitar (2020–present)
- Julio Fernandez - rhythm guitar (2020-present)
- Mika Filborne – keyboards (2013–2015, 2021-present)

=== Former members ===
Guitars:

- Kim Sindahl (1993)
- Christian Brenner (1992)
- Mikkel Andersen (1993–1995)
- Jens Lee (1994–1995)
- Kim Larsen (1994–1999)
- Morten Skrubbeltrang (1997–1998)
- Peter Erecius Poulsen (1998–2009)
- Tais Pedersen (2000–2009)
- Mattias Svensson (2010–2012)
- Michael Denner (2006) (session member)
- Gert Lund – guitar (2013–2016)
- Rune Stiassny – guitars (2009–2019)

Drums:

- Pouli Choir (1993)
- Jesper Saltoft (1993–1999)
- Morten Plenge (2000–2001)
- Nikolaj Borg (2004–2009)

Bass:

- Peter Heede (2000–2001)
- Lennart E. Jacobsen (2001–2007)

Keyboards:

- Anders Ro Nielsen (1993–2009)

Timeline

== Discography ==
=== Albums ===
- Paradise Belongs to You (1997)
- Martyre (2000)
- Veronika Decides to Die (2006)
- Saturn in Ascension (2012)
- The Storm Within (2023)

=== Demos and EPs ===
- Demo 1994 (1994)
- Paradise Belongs to You (advance tape) (1996)
- For the Loveless Lonely Nights (1998)
- Rehearsal studio tracks 1999 (1999)
- Rehearsal studio tracks 2004 (2004)
- The Lighthouse Session (2022)
- The Lighthouse Session II (2026)
