= Mar de Grises =

Chilean band

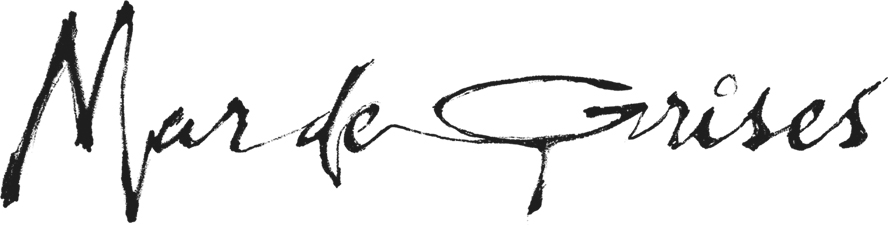

- Mar de Grises at Firebox Metal Fest, Seinajoki, Finland, 2008

Background information
- Origin: Santiago, Chile
- Genres: Death/doom metal
- Years active: 2000–2013. 2024–Present
- Label: Season of Mist
- Members: Juan Escobar Rodrigo M Sergio A Rodrigo G Alejandro Arce
- Past members: Marcelo Rodriguez, Herumor V.
- Website: www.mardegrises.com

Mar de Grises is a Chilean death/doom metal band created in 2000. "Mar de Grises" could be translated into English as "Sea of Grief," or equivalently, as grey is the Spanish color of sorrows as blue is in English, "Sea of Greys".

== History ==
Members of the band met while studying at university and formed a group just with the idea to spend some leisure time.

Inspired in bands like My Dying Bride, In the Woods..., Emperor, Poema Arcanus, Anathema, Samael, Death, Tiamat, At the Gates, and non-metal bands.

Their compositions, while rooted in the style of doom metal, incorporate other genres such as progressive rock, post-rock, ambient, electronic music, death metal and others.

Their first demo was recorded in 2002, and was convincing enough to get them a contract with Finnish label, Firebox Records. This was quite rare at the time for a rock or metal band from South America, as the band was barely even known in Chile itself.

With Firebox Records, Mar de Grises released their first LP titled The Tatterdemalion Express in January 2004, with sound engineers that had previously worked with bands like Six Magics and Poema Arcanus. The album received a positive reception and was acclaimed by critics, earning titles like "Best Doom Album" and "Best New Band" from important magazines.

In 2005 Mar de Grises toured Europe for the first time, performing in France, the Netherlands, Spain, Belgium and Italy. The tour included festivals like Doom Shall Rise and Belgian Doom Night.

In 2006, singer Marcelo Rodríguez left the band and was replaced by Juan Escobar.

In September 2007 Mar de Grises started to record their second album at the same studio where the first one was completed.

In 2008, Mar de Grises finished and released their second album, called Draining the Waterheart, and started their second European Tour from 16 April to 12 May, performing 20 concerts in 10 countries (Portugal, Spain, France, Netherlands, Germany, Czech Republic, Slovakia, Switzerland, Belgium, Finland). During that tour, they traveled with bands like Saturnus and Thurisaz, including a short tour in Finland (Helsinki, Turku and Seinajoki) with Ablaze in Hatred. In Finland, Mar de Grises performed at the Firebox Metal Festival, sharing the stage with bands like Dark Tranquillity, Impaled Nazarene and Enslaved.

In 2010, Mar de Grises signed a contract with global French label, Season of Mist, moving away from Finland-based label, Firebox.

In 2011, Streams Inwards was rated the Metal Storm No. 1 doom metal album of 2010 by users.

In 2013 they decided to disband.

In 2024, the musicians announced the reunion of the band.

== Musicians ==
- Juan Escobar – vocals and keyboards
- Rodrigo Morris – guitar (2000—2013. 2024 — present)
- Sergio Alvarez – guitar (Mourner's Lament) (?—2013. 2024 — present)
- Rodrigo Galvez – bass (ex-Mourner's Lament) (2000—2013, 2024 — present)
- Alejandro Arce – drums (Norphelida, Target, Kintral) (2000—2013. 2024 — present)

=== Former musicians ===
- Marcelo R. – vocals and keyboard (2001–2005)
- Herumor V – guitar (AuraHiemis)
- Germán Toledo – vocals (2012–2013)

== Records ==
- Demo 2002 (2002)
- The Tatterdemalion Express (2004)
- Draining the Waterheart (2008)
- First River Regards (2009)
- Streams Inwards (2010)
