= My Dying Bride discography =

- Studio albums: 15
- EPs: 8
- Live albums: 2
- Compilation albums: 7
- Singles: 4
- Video albums: 2
- Music videos: 15
- Demos: 1

This article lists the comprehensive discography for English doom metal band My Dying Bride.

== Studio albums ==
| Title | Album details | Peak chart positions | | | | | | |
| Title | Album details | FIN | GER | UK | FRA | NOR | BEL (FL) | BEL (WA) |
|---|---|---|---|---|---|---|---|---|
| As the Flower Withers | Released: 26 May 1992; Label: Peaceville; Formats: CD, CS, LP, DL | — | — | — | — | — | — | — |
| Turn Loose the Swans | Released: 11 October 1993; Label: Peaceville; Formats: CD, CS, LP, DL | — | — | — | — | — | — | — |
| The Angel and the Dark River | Released: 15 May 1995; Label: Peaceville; Formats: CD, CS, LP, DL | — | 61 | — | — | — | — | — |
| Like Gods of the Sun | Released: 14 October 1996; Label: Peaceville; Formats: CD, CS, LP, DL | 33 | — | 131 | — | — | — | — |
| 34.788%...Complete | Released: 6 October 1998; Label: Peaceville; Formats: CD, CS, LP, DL | — | — | — | — | — | — | — |
| The Light at the End of the World | Released: 12 October 1999; Label: Peaceville; Formats: CD, CS, LP, DL | — | — | — | — | — | — | — |
| The Dreadful Hours | Released: 13 November 2001; Label: Peaceville; Formats: CD, CS, LP, DL | — | — | — | — | — | — | — |
| Songs of Darkness, Words of Light | Released: 23 February 2004; Label: Peaceville; Formats: CD, DL | — | — | — | — | — | — | — |
| A Line of Deathless Kings | Released: 9 October 2006; Label: Peaceville; Formats: CD, LP, DL | — | — | — | — | — | — | — |
| For Lies I Sire | Released: 23 March 2009; Label: Peaceville; Formats: CD, LP, DL | 24 | — | — | 176 | 36 | — | — |
| Evinta | Released: 30 May 2011; Label: Peaceville; Formats: CD, DL | 48 | — | — | — | — | — | — |
| A Map of All Our Failures | Released: 15 October 2012; Label: Peaceville; Formats: CD, CD+DVD, LP, DL | 39 | 82 | 200 | 181 | — | 137 | 118 |
| Feel the Misery | Released: 18 September 2015; Label: Peaceville; Formats: CD | 33 | 57 | — | 172 | — | 60 | — |
| The Ghost of Orion | Released: 6 March 2020; Label: Nuclear Blast; Formats: CD | 34 | 12 | 193 | 172 | — | 107 | 160 |
| A Mortal Binding | Released: 19 April 2024; Label: Nuclear Blast; Formats: CD | — | 19 | — | — | — | 108 | 155 |
"—" denotes a recording that did not chart or was not released in that territory.

== Compilation albums ==
| Title | Album details |
|---|---|
| The Stories | Released: 17 October 1994; Label: Peaceville Records; Formats: CD |
| Trinity | Released: 2 October 1995; Label: Peaceville Records; Formats: CD, CS, DL |
| Meisterwerk 1 | Released: 7 November 2000; Label: Peaceville Records; Formats: CD, CS, DL |
| Meisterwerk 2 | Released: 13 June 2001; Label: Peaceville Records; Formats: CD, CS, DL |
| Anti-Diluvian Chronicles | Released: 23 May 2005; Label: Peaceville Records; Formats: CD |
| The Vaulted Shadows | Released: 26 May 2014; Label: Peaceville Records; Formats: CD, DL |
| Meisterwerk 3 | Released: 28 Oct 2016; Label: Peaceville Records; Formats: CD |

== Demos ==
| Title | Album details |
|---|---|
| Towards the Sinister | Released: 1990; Label: Self-released; Formats: CS |

== EPs ==
| Title | Album details |
|---|---|
| Symphonaire Infernus et Spera Empyrium | Released: 16 March 1992; Label: Peaceville Records; Formats: CD |
| The Thrash of Naked Limbs | Released: 22 February 1993; Label: Peaceville Records; Formats: LP |
| I Am the Bloody Earth | Released: 17 January 1994; Label: Peaceville Records; Formats: CD |
| Bring Me Victory | Released: 26 October 2009; Label: Peaceville Records; Formats: CD, DL |
| The Barghest O' Whitby | Released: 7 November 2011; Label: Peaceville Records; Formats: CD, DL |
| The Manuscript | Released: 13 May 2013; Label: Peaceville Records; Formats: CD, DL |
| Macabre Cabaret | Released: 20 November 2020; Label: Nuclear Blast; Formats: CD, DL, vinyl |

== Live albums ==
| Title | Album details |
|---|---|
| The Voice of the Wretched | Released: 21 May 2002; Label: Peaceville Records; Formats: CD, DL |
| An Ode to Woe | Released: 28 April 2008; Label: Peaceville Records; Formats: CD, CD+DVD, DL |

== Singles ==
| Title | Year | Peak chart positions | Album |
| Title | Year | FIN | Album |
|---|---|---|---|
| "God Is Alone" | 1991 | — | Symphonaire Infernus et Spera Empyrium |
| "Unreleased Bitterness" | 1993 | — | non-album single |
| "The Sexuality of Bereavement" | 1994 | — | non-album single |
| "Deeper Down" | 2006 | 15 | A Line of Deathless Kings |
| "Hollow Cathedra" | 2015 | — | non-album single |
"—" denotes a recording that did not chart or was not released in that territory.

== Video albums ==
| Title | Video details | Notes |
|---|---|---|
| For Darkest Eyes | Released: 1997; Label: Peaceville Records; Formats: VHS | re-released on DVD on 29 April 2002 |
| Sinamorata | Released: 25 August 2005; Label: Peaceville Records; Formats: DVD | |

== Music videos ==
| Year | Title | Directed | Album |
|---|---|---|---|
| 1991 | "Symphonaire Infernus Et Spera Empyrium" | — | Symphonaire Infernus Et Spera Empyrium |
| 1992 | "The Thrash Of Naked Limbs" | — | The Thrash Of Naked Limbs |
| 1994 | "The Songless Bird" | — | Turn Loose The Swans |
| 1995 | "The Cry Of Mankind" | — | The Angel And The Dark River |
| 1996 | "For You" | — | Like Gods Of The Sun |
| 1997 | "I Am The Bloody Earth" | — | For Darkest Eyes |
| 2004 | "The Prize Of Beauty" | — | Songs Of Darkness, Words Of Light |
| 2004 | "My Wine In Silence" | — | Songs Of Darkness, Words Of Light |
| 2004 | "The Blue Lotus" | David Palzer | Songs Of Darkness, Words Of Light |
| 2005 | "My Hope The Destroyer" | — | Sinamorata |
| 2006 | "Deeper Down" | Charlie Granberg | Deeper Down |
| 2006 | "I Cannot Be Loved" | — | A Line Of Deathless Kings |
| 2009 | "Bring Me Victory" | Charlie Granberg | For Lies I Sire |
| 2012 | "The Poorest Waltz" | Ingram Blakelock | A Map Of All Our Failures |
| 2015 | "Feel the Misery" | James Sharrock & Ryan Mackfall | Feel the Misery |
| 2020 | "Your Broken Shore" | James Sharrock | The Ghost of Orion |
| 2020 | "To Outlive the Gods" | Hal & Beth Sinden | The Ghost of Orion |
| 2020 | "Macabre Cabaret" | | Macabre Cabaret |
| 2024 | "Thornwyck Hymn" | | A Mortal Binding |
| 2024 | "The 2nd of Three Bells" | | A Mortal Binding |
