= Meisterwerk 2 =

Compilation album by My Dying Bride
- Released: 13 June 2001
- Genre: Doom metal; death-doom; gothic metal
- Length: 61:56
- Label: Peaceville

My Dying Bride chronology
| Meisterwerk 1 (2000) | Meisterwerk 2 (2001) | The Dreadful Hours (2001) |

Professional ratings
Review scores
| Source | Rating |
|---|---|
| Allmusic | 2.5/5 stars |
| Kerrang! | 4/5 stars |

Meisterwerk 2 is the fourth compilation album by English doom metal band My Dying Bride, which features both album tracks and rare recordings. Its companion piece - Meisterwerk 1 - was released the previous year. It is the third of five My Dying Bride compilation albums, following 1995's "Trinity" and "Meisterwerk 1", preceding "Anti-Diluvian Chronicles" in 2005 and "Meisterwerk 3" in 2016.

== Track listing ==
1. "Sear Me MCMXCIII" (from "Turn Loose the Swans")
2. "Follower" (from the Japanese version of "34.788%...Complete")
3. "Vast Choirs" (from "Towards the Sinister")
4. "She Is the Dark" (from "The Light at the End of the World")
5. "Catching Feathers" (from "Towards the Sinister")
6. "Two Winters Only" (from "The Angel and the Dark River")
7. "Your River" (from "Turn Loose The Swans")
8. "Some Velvet Morning" - Nancy Sinatra/Lee Hazlewood - (from the Peaceville Records "X" compilation)
9. "Roads" - Portishead - (from the Peaceville Records "X" compilation)
10. "For You (Video Track)" - (full-length version from "Like Gods of the Sun")

== Credits ==
- Aaron Stainthorpe - vocals, all tracks
- Andrew Craighan - guitar, all tracks and bass on tracks 3 and 5
- Calvin Robertshaw - guitar, tracks 1-3,5-9
- Hamish Glencross - guitar, track 4
- Adrian Jackson - bass, tracks 1,2,3,6-9
- Martin Powell - violin, keyboard, tracks 1,6-9
- Rick Miah - drums, tracks 1,3,5-7,9
- Shaun Steels - drums, track 4
- Bill Law - drums, tracks 2, 7,8
- Keith Appleton, 'Mags' - keyboards tracks 7,8
- Jonny Maudling - keyboards, track 4
