= Meisterwerk 1 =

Meisterwerk I

Compilation album by My Dying Bride
- Released: 7 November 2000
- Genre: Doom metal; gothic metal
- Length: 59:41
- Label: Peaceville

My Dying Bride chronology
The Light at the End of the World (1999)	Meisterwerk I (2000)	Meisterwerk 2 (2001)

Professional ratings
Review scores
Source	Rating
Allmusic	2.5/5 stars

Meisterwerk 1 is the third compilation album by English doom metal band My Dying Bride, which features both album tracks and rare recordings. Its companion piece - Meisterwerk 2 - was released the following year. It is the second of four My Dying Bride compilation albums, following 1995's Trinity and followed by Meisterwerk 2 later the same year and "Anti-Diluvian Chronicles" in 2005.

== Track listing ==
No.	Title	Length
1.	"Symphonaire Infernus et Spera Empyrium" (demo version from "Towards the Sinister")	8:55
2.	"The Crown of Sympathy" (from "Turn Loose the Swans")	12:11
3.	"The Grief of Age" (demo version from "Towards the Sinister")	4:10
4.	"A Kiss to Remember" (from "Like Gods of the Sun")	7:32
5.	"Grace Unhearing (Portishell Mix)" (from limited copies of "Like Gods of the Sun")	7:07
6.	"For You" (from "Like Gods of the Sun")	6:37
7.	"Unreleased Bitterness" (from the rare "Unreleased Bitterness" single)	7:42
8.	"Sear Me III" (from "The Light at the End of the World")	5:27
9.	"The Cry of Mankind (Bonus Video Track)" (edited track from "The Angel and the Dark River")	4:36

- Some copies contain the Album "The Light at the End of the World" and not "Meisterwerk 1", The disc has the made in E.U. blacked out and it is unknown how many were pressed.

== Credits ==
- Aaron Stainthorpe - vocals, all tracks
- Andrew Craighan - guitar, all tracks (bass on tracks 1,3)
- Calvin Robertshaw - guitar, all tracks (guest on 8)
- Hamish Glencross - guitar on track 8
- Adrian Jackson - bass, track 2,4-9
- Martin Powell - violin, keyboard, tracks 1-7,9
- Rick Miah - drums on tracks 1-7,9
- Shaun Steels - drums on track 8
- Jonny Maudling - keyboard on track 8
