= For Lies I Sire =

Studio album by My Dying Bride
- Released: 23 March 2009
- Recorded: 2008–2009; Futureworks Studios, Manchester, UK
- Genre: Doom metal; gothic metal
- Length: 59:54
- Producer: Peaceville

My Dying Bride chronology
An Ode to Woe (2008)	For Lies I Sire (2009)	Bring Me Victory (2009)

For Lies I Sire is the tenth studio album by English doom metal band My Dying Bride, released on 23 March 2009 via Peaceville Records and 21 April 2009 in the United States. It is the first album without keyboardist Sarah Stanton since she joined My Dying Bride in 2004 for their Songs of Darkness, Words of Light album. Musically, it is their first album since 1996's Like Gods of the Sun to feature a violin, performed by new band member Katie Stone. The album was recorded during September 2008 in Manchester's Futureworks Studio.

== Musical style ==
Andrew Craighan stated that the feel of the album is, in his words, "heading for empty and bleak with flashes of rage." Vocalist Aaron Stainthorpe stated in an interview that For Lies I Sire is "quite possibly the most depressing thing we've created to date", and that it's an album that unites the past of the band with the future.

The album is the first since 1996's album Like Gods of the Sun to feature a violin, this time performed by new keyboardist and violinist Katie Stone. The idea of using violin again has been described by Stainthorpe as adding "a deep range of feeling". The violin parts were well received by critics.

"A Chapter in Loathing" begins with the same riff that closed the band's last album, A Line of Deathless Kings.

This was the first studio release featuring keyboardist/violinist Katie Stone, drummer Dan Mullins and bassist Lena Abé, although the latter two also featured on the 2008 live CD/DVD An Ode to Woe. Stone resigned from the post to focus on her studies soon after the release of the album, to be replaced by Shaun MacGowan for the upcoming tour and Bring Me Victory EP.

== Critical reception ==
Professional ratings
Review scores
Source	Rating
AllMusic	4/5 stars
Blistering	8.5/10 stars
Sputnikmusic	3/5 stars

The album was well received by critics. Thom Jurek of AllMusic especially praised Aaron Stainthorpe, calling his vocals "better than ever" and his lyrics "beautifully poetic and streamlined". Jurek also pointed out the entire band being on top-notch, with several good hooks in all instruments, and called the album both a good introduction to the band for new fans, and a good follow-up to fans of all the previous albums. David E. Gehlke of Blistering.com called For Lies I Sire to be My Dying Bride's second best album after 1999's The Light at the End of the World, and especially praised the work of new drummer Dan Mullins, noting that he put out an "inspired performance, even getting colossal drum roll treatment on My Body, A Funeral and the death metal-tinged A Chapter in Loathing".

At the same time, several critics have noted the departure of death grunts on the later albums, including For Lies I Sire. Trey Spencer of Sputnik Music feels it has the album lacking important parts and calling it "a shame [...] because musically this is some of the best material they’ve released in over a decade". He also adds that he enjoys the album, but is "constantly waiting for a little extra kick that never comes".

Especially the return of the violin, as performed by Katie Stone, has been praised by critics; the aforementioned Sputnik Music critic noted that Stone often performed in style of past violinist Martin Powell, only using the violin sparsely on certain passages, to surprise the listener. He especially praised the violin usage in the song My Body, a Funeral, noting that it "is used in a way that seems to extend the lyrics despite the lack of any words". David E. Gehlke of Blistering.com especially praised the album's interplay between the guitar riffs of Andrew Craighan's and Hamish Glencross, and Katie Stone's violin.

== Track listing ==
No.	Title	Length
1.	"My Body, a Funeral"	6:47
2.	"Fall with Me"	7:15
3.	"The Lies I Sire"	5:29
4.	"Bring Me Victory"	4:08
5.	"Echoes from a Hollow Soul"	7:19
6.	"ShadowHaunt"	4:37
7.	"Santuario di Sangue" ("Blood Sanctuary")	8:27
8.	"A Chapter in Loathing"	4:46
9.	"Death Triumphant" (silence after 9:36)	11:06
Total length:		59:54

== Personnel ==
- Aaron Stainthorpe – vocals
- Andrew Craighan – guitars
- Hamish Glencross – guitars
- Lena Abé – bass
- Katie Stone – keyboards, violins
- Dan Mullins – drums

== Charts ==
Chart (2009)	Peak position
Finnish Albums (Suomen virallinen lista)	24
French Albums (SNEP)	176
Norwegian Albums (VG-lista)	36
