= As the Flower Withers =

Studio album by My Dying Bride
- Released: 26 May 1992
- Recorded: December 1991 – January 1992
- Studio: Academy Studios
- Genre: Death-doom
- Length: 49:26
- Label: Peaceville
- Producer: Hammy, My Dying Bride, Keith Appleton (uncredited)

My Dying Bride chronology
| Symphonaire Infernus et Spera Empyrium (1992) | As the Flower Withers (1992) | The Thrash of Naked Limbs (1993) |

Professional ratings
Review scores
| Source | Rating |
|---|---|
| Allmusic | 3/5 stars |
| Collector's Guide to Heavy Metal | 7/10 |

As the Flower Withers is the debut studio album by English doom metal band My Dying Bride. The artwork was designed by Dave McKean. This is the only full-length My Dying Bride album on which lead vocalist Aaron Stainthorpe utilizes his death growl as the sole vocal style.

== Song information ==
Many of the tracks on this album have appeared in a different form on other My Dying Bride releases. "Sear Me" was the first in a trilogy of songs to bear the title, followed by the keyboard- and violin-only "Sear Me MCMXCIII" in 1993 and "Sear Me III" in 1999, which is more similar in style to the original, being a full band composition. "The Bitterness and the Bereavement" evolved from an earlier demo, which was released independently as "Unreleased Bitterness" in 1993. This version of the song also appears on the digipak re-release of As the Flower Withers, and on the rarities/best-of compilation Meisterwerk 1. "Vast Choirs" is a reworked version of the version that appears on the band's first recording, Towards the Sinister. This version is widely available on both Meisterwerk 2 and the 2004 reissue of Trinity. "The Return of the Beautiful" was re-recorded for 2001's The Dreadful Hours, with its title being slightly changed to "The Return to the Beautiful". Live versions of "The Forever People" can be found on the limited edition versions of The Angel and the Dark River and For Darkest Eyes. This song is often played as the last song of the set in many of the band's live shows.

== Track listing ==
All music is composed by My Dying Bride, all lyrics by Aaron Stainthorpe

| No. | Title | Length |
|---|---|---|
| 1. | "Silent Dance" | 2:13 |
| 2. | "Sear Me" | 9:06 |
| 3. | "The Forever People" | 4:10 |
| 4. | "The Bitterness and the Bereavement" | 7:37 |
| 5. | "Vast Choirs" | 8:16 |
| 6. | "The Return of the Beautiful": "I. The Silence"; "II. The Sadness"; "III. The Lust"; "IV. The Battle"; "V. The Return" | 12:49: 3:53; 3:03; 2:54; 1:05; 1:51 |
| Total length: | | 44:12 |

CD version bonus track
| No. | Title | Length |
|---|---|---|
| 7. | "Erotic Literature" | 5:14 |
| Total length: | | 49:26 |

2004 reissue bonus track (includes CD version bonus track)
| No. | Title | Length |
|---|---|---|
| 8. | "Unreleased Bitterness" | 7:44 |
| Total length: | | 57:08 |

== Personnel ==
- Aaron Stainthorpe - vocals
- Andrew Craighan - guitar
- Calvin Robertshaw - guitar
- Adrian Jackson - bass
- Rick Miah - drums

Additional personnel

- Martin Powell - session violin
- Wolfgang Bremmer - session horn
- Dave McKean - cover photography, illustration and design
- Noel Summerville - mastering (at Transfermation, London)
