= The Manuscript (My Dying Bride EP) =

EP by My Dying Bride
- Released: 13 May 2013
- Recorded: 2012 at Futureworks Studios, Manchester
- Genre: Doom metal, gothic metal, death-doom
- Length: 27:23
- Label: Peaceville
- Producer: Rob "Mags" Magoolagan

My Dying Bride chronology
A Map of All Our Failures (2012)	The Manuscript (2013)	Feel the Misery (2015)

The Manuscript is the sixth EP by English doom metal band My Dying Bride, released on 13 May 2013 on CD and vinyl. It contains four tracks, three of which were recorded at the same time as the band's previous album, A Map of All Our Failures.

== Background ==
Speaking to Metal Forces magazine, vocalist Aaron Stainthorpe said, "[the songs are] very similar to 'A Map of All Our Failures', because they were written and recorded at the same time, except for one song. That really stands out… [laughs] It's full-on sort of epic death metal; it's swords and axes, a proper warrior battle kind of track that's almost medieval in flavor. You can almost picture the scene; it's set in a snowy kind of mountainous landscape. There are sound effects and all sorts of mayhem going on in it, and death metal vocals not quite all the way through it, but near enough. It even has a Swedish title which because my Swedish isn't great, I'm not gonna repeat here. [laughs] I need to get the pronunciation right before I do that."

The EP's title track was made available to stream from SoundCloud by Terrorizer. Stainthorpe has announced that a music video for the title track is being produced.

Professional ratings
Review scores
Source	Rating
About.com	4/5 stars
Brave Words & Bloody Knuckles	8/10 stars
Hellbound	8/10 stars
Sputnikmusic	3.1/5

== Track listing ==
All lyrics are written by Aaron Stainthorpe; all music is composed by My Dying Bride.

No.	Title	Length
1.	"The Manuscript"	6:25
2.	"Vår Gud Över Er" ("Our God Over You")	8:49
3.	"A Pale Shroud of Longing"	7:49
4.	"Only Tears to Replace Her With"	4:20
Total length:		27:23

== Personnel ==
=== My Dying Bride ===
- Aaron Stainthorpe – lead vocals
- Andrew Craighan – guitar
- Hamish Glencross – guitar
- Lena Abé – bass
- Shaun MacGowan – violin, keyboards

=== Additional musicians ===
- Shaun Taylor Steels – drums
