= Symphonaire Infernus et Spera Empyrium =

EP by My Dying Bride
- Released: 16 March 1992
- Recorded: 1991
- Genre: Death-doom
- Length: 20:14
- Label: Peaceville
- Producer: Peaceville Records

My Dying Bride chronology
Towards the Sinister (demo) (1991)	Symphonaire Infernus et Spera Empyrium (1992)	As the Flower Withers (1992)

Symphonaire Infernus et Spera Empyrium is the first EP by English doom metal band My Dying Bride. "Symphonaire" was made only a few months after signing to the Peaceville Records label. The song was also released as a vinyl record and an audio tape. The artwork was designed and created by Dave McKean, who also designed some of the band's other sleeves including "As the Flower Withers".

The EP was the band's first release as a 5-piece, following the introduction of bassist Adrian Jackson. The title track was originally recorded for the band's first demo, "Towards the Sinister". This version can be found on the compilation album "Meisterwerk 1". "God Is Alone" was originally recorded as a single that also includes "De Sade Soliloquay". These versions have not been re-released since their original appearance.

The EP was also released as part of the limited box-set, "The Stories", alongside the band's other singles, "The Thrash of Naked Limbs" and "I Am the Bloody Earth". All three were released on one disc on the compilation "Trinity" in 1995.

The song's video, available on "For Darkest Eyes" features bizarre imagery and slow-motion footage of the band members walking through the wilderness. The video version of the song is the edited version that appears as "Act 1" on the vinyl release of the EP. "Act 2" is the section of the songs which begins at 5:15 in the full-length version.

Live versions of the title track are available on "The Voice of the Wretched" and in the bonus features of the DVD version of "For Darkest Eyes".

== Track listing ==
=== CD ===
1. "Symphonaire Infernus et Spera Empyrium" – 11:39
2. "God Is Alone" – 4:51
3. "De Sade Soliloquay" – 3:42

=== Vinyl ===
1. "Symphonaire Infernus et Spera Empyrium Act 1"
2. "Symphonaire Infernus et Spera Empyrium Act 2"

=== Audio tape ===
1. "Symphonaire Infernus et Spera Empyrium" – 11:39
2. "God Is Alone" – 4:51
3. "De Sade Soliloquay" – 3:42

== Personnel ==
- Aaron Stainthorpe - vocals
- Andrew Craighan - guitar
- Calvin Robertshaw - guitar
- Adrian Jackson - bass
- Rick Miah - drums

=== Additional personnel ===
- Martin Powell - session violin
- Dave McKean - album artwork
