= Deeper Down =

Single by My Dying Bride
- Released: 18 September 2006
- Genre: Doom metal, gothic metal
- Length: 15:28
- Label: Peaceville Records
- Songwriter(s): Adrian Jackson * Aaron Stainthorpe * Andrew Craighan

My Dying Bride singles chronology
"The Sexuality of Bereavement" (1994)	"Deeper Down" (2006)

"Deeper Down" is a song by English doom metal band My Dying Bride, released on 18 September 2006. It is an edited version of the song which appears on the album A Line of Deathless Kings.

"Deeper Down" contains two other tracks; "The Child of Eternity", an exclusive track not featured on the album, as it is more in tune with the band's earlier death metal style, and a live audio version of "A Kiss to Remember", as featured on My Dying Bride's Sinamorata DVD.

A video for "Deeper Down" is featured on the limited edition of A Line of Deathless Kings. It was directed by Charlie Granberg, who also directed Katatonia's videos for "My Twin" and "Deliberation".

== Track listing ==
1. "Deeper Down" (Uberdoom edit) – 3:50
2. "The Child of Eternity" – 4:16
3. "A Kiss to Remember" (Live) – 7:22

== Personnel ==
- Aaron Stainthorpe - vocals
- Adrian Jackson - bass
- Hamish Glencross - guitar
- Andrew Craighan - guitar
- Sarah Stanton - keyboards
- John Bennett - drums
- Shaun Taylor-Steels - drums on track 3
