= The Barghest O' Whitby =

EP by My Dying Bride
- Released: 7 November 2011
- Recorded: 2011 at Futureworks Studios, Manchester
- Genre: Doom metal; death-doom
- Length: 27:04
- Label: Peaceville

My Dying Bride chronology
Evinta (2011)	The Barghest O' Whitby (2011)	A Map of All Our Failures (2012)

The Barghest O' Whitby is the fifth EP by English doom metal band My Dying Bride, released on 7 November 2011. It consists of a single, 27-minute track.

== Background ==
Speaking to Lords of Metal, Aaron Stainthorpe said of the piece:

Well, I wrote it myself, based on rough stories that we have read about in the Yorkshire area. All old villages and towns in Europe have folklore tales of spirits and dark beings and fairies and things like that. And I had heard several different stories about large, black dogs, crawling the moors of Yorkshire... And I thought: "Well, we live in Yorkshire and we never really looked at our own heritage before in My Dying Bride lyrics. Let us look at this and see if we could invent our own story, our own Yorkshire folklore." And so I wrote a story called 'The Barghest O’Whitby' about a large black dog which, at first, it seems to crawl the moor land randomly killing people, but it does not. The lyrics tell a story of why this dog is doing what it is doing and its final victim is waiting up in the old sea town, the old fishing town of Whitby. That is where the final confrontation takes place and it is a story of revenge... [...] We simply don’t indulge in the lore of our historic land enough, so I really went to town with this one. It follows the tale of a huge hound which ‘haunts’ the moors of northern Yorkshire seemingly killing at random. But there is a tale to be had here. The large dog is witness to its master being brutally murdered by a gang of smugglers out by a small cottage on the moor. The dog finally breaks free from its binding and sniffs out the culprits, doing away with them one by one. It is very much a story of revenge where the evil killer is actually the one clearing the streets of the riffraff and doing humanity a favour.

According to Stainthorpe, the artwork pictures the band's guitarist's Hamish Glencross' dog which he "embellished... a little bit in Photoshop. It is all my kind of artwork, pushed together to give a visual interpretation of what you might see in the lyrics. It is quite nice, no high art, but it is just an interpretation of what you are going to get inside the music".

== Track listing ==
No.	Title	Length
1.	"The Barghest O' Whitby"	27:04
Total length:		27:04

== Credits ==
- Aaron Stainthorpe — vocals
- Andrew Craighan — guitar
- Hamish Glencross — guitar
- Lena Abé — bass
- Shaun "Winter" Taylor-Steels — drums
- Shaun Macgowan — violin and keyboards
