= 34.788%...Complete =

Studio album by My Dying Bride
- Released: 6 October 1998
- Recorded: 1998
- Studio: Academy Studios
- Genre: Doom metal, gothic metal
- Length: 56:42
- Label: Peaceville
- Producer: 'Mags', assisted by Calvin Robertshaw

My Dying Bride chronology
Like Gods of the Sun (1996)	34.788%...Complete (1998)	The Light at the End of the World (1999)

Professional ratings
Review scores
Source	Rating
Allmusic	3/5 stars
Collector's Guide to Heavy Metal	9/10

34.788%...Complete is the fifth studio album by English doom metal band My Dying Bride, released on 6 October 1998. The track "Under Your Wings and into Your Arms" appears on both The Voice of the Wretched CD and the Sinamorata DVD, and the opening track, "The Whore, the Cook and the Mother" appeared on their latest live DVD, An Ode to Woe.

The Japanese version of the album featured a bonus track, entitled "Follower". This track was also featured on the 2003 re-release digipak of the album.

The album was dedicated to the memory of Richard Jackson, father of bassist Adrian.

== Album information ==
34.788%...Complete is the only My Dying Bride record to feature drummer Bill Law. It is also the first to exclude long-time keyboardist and violinist Martin Powell, who became a live member of Anathema shortly afterwards.

The spoken word interlude during "The Whore, the Cook and the Mother" is based on the replicant interrogation method from the movie Blade Runner. Questions are asked in Cantonese and reversed, and singer Aaron Stainthorpe's replies can be heard.

The album's title was derived from a dream that guitarist Calvin Robertshaw had where he was told the human race had a limited lifespan on Earth, 34.788% of which had already expired.

== Musical style ==
Despite a more experimental sound, the album continues the clean doom metal style of 1996's Like Gods of the Sun, highlighting the interplay of guitars played by Calvin Robertshaw and Andrew Craighan.

== Track listing ==
- All songs published By VILE Music.

No.	Title	Length
1.	"The Whore, the Cook and the Mother"	12:00
2.	"The Stance of Evander Sinque"	5:31
3.	"Der Überlebende" ("The Survivor")	7:39
4.	"Heroin Chic"	8:03
5.	"Apocalypse Woman"	7:38
6.	"Base Level Erotica"	9:55
7.	"Under Your Wings and into Your Arms"	5:57
Total length:		56:42

=== Japanese Edition ===
No.	Title	Length
8.	"Follower" (Japanese bonus track)	5:12
Total length:		61:54

== Personnel ==
=== My Dying Bride ===
- Aaron Stainthorpe – vocals
- Andrew Craighan – guitars
- Calvin Robertshaw – guitars
- Adrian Jackson – bass
- Bill Law – drums

=== Additional personnel ===
- Keith Appleton and Mags – keyboards
- Michelle Richfield – female vocals on "Heroin Chic"

== Production ==
- Arranged by My Dying Bride
- Produced and mixed by Mags and Calvin Robertshaw
- Engineered by Mags, with assistance from James Anderson and Stevie Clow
