= Anti-Diluvian Chronicles =

Compilation album by My Dying Bride
- Released: 23 May 2005
- Genre: Doom metal; gothic metal; death/doom
- Length: 226:11
- Label: Peaceville

My Dying Bride chronology
Songs of Darkness, Words of Light (2004)	Anti-Diluvian Chronicles (2005)	Sinamorata (2005)

Anti-Diluvian Chronicles is the fifth compilation album by English doom metal band My Dying Bride, which features both album tracks and new remixes. It is the fourth My Dying Bride compilation album, following 1995's Trinity and 2000's Meisterwerk 1 and Meisterwerk 2.

== Song information ==
The remix tracks were made especially for this release by My Dying Bride, and rather than just remixes of the original material, additional new parts were also recorded and incorporated into the original songs. The key differences are that "My Wine in Silence" has a completely new drum track, and the harsh vocals were removed from the middle section of the song, as Aaron Stainthorpe was not pleased with them as they were originally recorded and released, and maintains he was coerced into it by his fellow band members. "The Wreckage of My Flesh" is stripped of nearly all instrumentation other than keyboards and the lead guitar parts, and "The Raven and the Rose" features a guitar solo from Hamish Glencross not present in the original, a more distorted harsh vocal, more sound effects, and has its ending removed.

The package also contains a poster and a booklet with an extensive interview with Aaron. It is contained in a clamshell digipak like most recent My Dying Bride releases.

== Track listing ==
=== Disc one ===
1. Catherine Blake – 6:30
2. My Wine in Silence (Remix) – 6:02
3. A Doomed Lover – 7:52
4. The Blue Lotus – 6:34
5. The Dreadful Hours – 9:23
6. My Hope, the Destroyer – 6:45
7. The Deepest of All Hearts – 8:55
8. She Is the Dark (Live) – 8:40
9. The Light at the End of the World – 10:37
10. The Fever Sea (Live) – 4:14

=== Disc two ===
1. The Raven and the Rose (remix) – 5:49
2. Sear Me III – 5:25
3. The Whore, the Cook and the Mother – 11:59
4. Der Überlebende – 7:38
5. Under Your Wings and into Your Arms – 5:58
6. Like Gods of the Sun – 5:40
7. Here in the Throat – 6:20
8. For My Fallen Angel – 5:54
9. The Cry of Mankind – 12:12
10. From Darkest Skies – 7:50

=== Disc three ===
1. The Wreckage of My Flesh (Remix) – 9:04
2. Turn Loose the Swans – 10:07
3. Black God – 4:51
4. Sear Me – 9:05
5. The Forever People (live) – 4:24
6. The Bitterness and the Bereavement – 7:37
7. Symphonaire Infernus et Spera Imperium – 11:38
8. God Is Alone – 4:50
9. The Thrash of Naked Limbs – 6:12
10. The Sexuality of Bereavement – 8:04

== Credits ==
- Aaron Stainthorpe - vocals
- Andrew Craighan - guitar, bass
- Calvin Robertshaw - guitar
- Hamish Glencross - guitar
- Adrian Jackson - bass
- Martin Powell - violin, keyboard
- Sarah Stanton - keyboard
- Yasmin Ahmed - keyboard
- Rick Miah - drums
- Bill Law - drums
- Shaun Steels - drums
- Keith Appleton, 'Mags', Jonny Maudling - keyboards
