= Macabre Cabaret =

EP by My Dying Bride
- Released: 20 November 2020
- Genre: Doom metal; gothic metal; death-doom
- Length: 21:56
- Label: Nuclear Blast
- Producer: Mark Mynett

My Dying Bride chronology
The Ghost of Orion (2020)	Macabre Cabaret (2020)	A Mortal Binding (2024)

Macabre Cabaret is the seventh EP by English doom metal band My Dying Bride, released in CD and vinyl formats via Nuclear Blast on 20 November 2020.

A music video for the track 'Macabre Cabaret', directed by Hal Sinden of Eulogy Media Ltd., was released on 20 November 2020.

== Background ==
Frontman Aaron Stainthorpe said of the album:

Macabre Cabaret delves into the shadow empire of dark love and the consequences of unchecked sexuality. The deep passion of physical desire and its all-conquering rage over pure love is written bleakly here. A destructive essence within the soul can’t help but rear its ugly head. A Secret Kiss is the final and lasting mark on the soul any human will feel when the lights have dulled and nothing meaningful remains for them. All religion features a shadow creature who arrives at the point of extinction and the release of the human soul, to either guide them to majesty or allow them do fall eternally into the ether. A Purse of Gold and Stars is where we keep our hopes and desires and affection, perhaps in a dreamlike state, unattainable yet we still reach out for them. The trinkets and shiny baubles we call happiness and love are what we try so hard to keep close and protect. But it is never quite like that in real life and is often a struggle tainted with sadness but still, we hold the purse close and in tight cold hands.

== Track listing ==
All lyrics are written by Aaron Stainthorpe; all music is composed by My Dying Bride.

No.	Title	Length
1.	"Macabre Cabaret"	10:00
2.	"A Secret Kiss"	6:22
3.	"A Purse of Gold and Stars"	5:34
4.	"Orchestral Shores (Buiksloterkerk Cathedral Mix)"	3:51
Total length:		21:56

"Orchestral Shores (Buiksloterkerk Cathedral Mix)" is listed as a bonus track, but appears of the physical media formats of the EP without being listed on My Dying Bride's Bandcamp page.

== Personnel ==
=== My Dying Bride ===
- Aaron Stainthorpe – lead vocals
- Andrew Craighan – guitar
- Neil Blanchett – guitar
- Lena Abé – bass
- Shaun MacGowan – violin, keyboards
- Jeff Singer – drums
