= The Dreadful Hours =

Studio album by My Dying Bride
- Released: 13 November 2001
- Recorded: 2001
- Genre: Death-doom; gothic metal
- Length: 70:51
- Label: Peaceville
- Producer: Mags, Andrew Craighan

My Dying Bride chronology
Meisterwerk 2 (2001)	The Dreadful Hours (2001)	The Voice of the Wretched (2002)

Professional ratings
Review scores
Source	Rating
AllMusic	4.5/5 stars
Chronicles of Chaos	9/10
Metal.de	8/10
Release Magazine	8/10
Stereo & Video	4/5 stars

The Dreadful Hours is the seventh studio album by English doom metal band My Dying Bride, released on 13 November 2001. It contains a remake of "The Return of the Beautiful" (renamed "The Return to the Beautiful") from the band's debut album, As the Flower Withers. The Dreadful Hours was issued in a digipak with a full colour booklet.

== Track listing ==
No.	Title	Length
1.	"The Dreadful Hours"	9:23
2.	"The Raven and the Rose"	8:12
3.	"Le Figlie della Tempesta" (Italian for "The Daughters of the Storm")	10:08
4.	"Black Heart Romance"	5:23
5.	"A Cruel Taste of Winter"	7:36
6.	"My Hope, the Destroyer"	6:44
7.	"The Deepest of All Hearts"	8:56
8.	"The Return to the Beautiful: "I. The Silence"; "II. The Sadness"; "III. The Lust"; "IV. The Battle"; "V. The Return"	14:23
Total length:		70:51

== Personnel ==
- Aaron Stainthorpe - vocals
- Andrew Craighan - guitars
- Hamish Glencross - guitars
- Adrian Jackson - bass
- Shaun Taylor-Steels - drums

=== Additional Personnel ===
- Jonny Maudling - keyboards
- Yasmin Ahmed - keyboards on "A Cruel Taste of Winter"
