= The Thrash of Naked Limbs =

EP by My Dying Bride
- Released: 22 February 1993
- Recorded: September 1992
- Genre: Death-doom
- Length: 18:03
- Label: Peaceville
- Producer: My Dying Bride

My Dying Bride chronology
As the Flower Withers (1992)	The Thrash of Naked Limbs (1993)	Turn Loose the Swans (1993)

The Thrash of Naked Limbs is the second EP by English doom metal band My Dying Bride. This EP was also released as a vinyl record. By this time, the band was a 6-piece, having added session violinist and keyboardist Martin Powell as an official band member.

The EP was also released as part of the limited box-set, "The Stories", alongside the band's other singles, Symphonaire Infernus et Spera Empyrium and I Am the Bloody Earth. All three were released on one disc on the compilation Trinity in 1995.

The song's video, available on For Darkest Eyes features much slow motion footage of a girl writhing in her sleep, interspersed with barely visible footage of the band walking with torches. The video version of the song is an edited version, two minutes or so shorter than the EP version. A live version of the title track is also available on For Darkest Eyes.

The lyrics to "Le Cerf Malade" are a fragment from the fable 'Le Cerf Malade' by the 17th century French poet Jean de la Fontaine. The title literally means 'The Sick Stag'.

== Track listing ==
1. "The Thrash of Naked Limbs" – 6:13
2. "Le Cerf Malade" – 6:31
3. "Gather Me Up Forever" – 5:17

== Personnel ==
- Aaron Stainthorpe – vocals, artwork, photos
- Andrew Craighan – guitar
- Calvin Robertshaw – guitar, photos
- Adrian Jackson – bass
- Martin Powell – violin
- Rick Miah – drums
