= Bring Me Victory =

EP by My Dying Bride
- Released: October 2009
- Recorded: at Futureworks studio in Manchester
- Genres: Doom metal; gothic metal
- Length: 28:12
- Label: Peaceville

My Dying Bride chronology
For Lies I Sire (2009)	Bring Me Victory (2009)	Evinta (2011)

Bring Me Victory is the fourth EP by English doom metal band My Dying Bride. "Bring Me Victory" is a song from My Dying Bride's previous album, For Lies I Sire; a video was made for the song and released on this EP. "Scarborough Fair", an English traditional song, has two additional verses incorporated into it written by Aaron Stainthorpe. "Failure" is a cover of a song written by Swans. The original version had long been a highly respected song among the members of the band. "Vast Choirs" is a live version of a song originally released on My Dying Bride's first album, As the Flower Withers, and since included on several compilation releases.

This is the first release to feature Shaun Macgowan on keyboards and violins (on tracks 2 and 3), since he replaced Katie Stone's position in the band.

== Track listing ==
1. "Bring Me Victory" – 4:11
2. "Scarborough Fair" – 6:20
3. "Failure" (Swans cover) – 6:47
4. "Vast Choirs" (Live at Graspop Metal Meeting 2008) – 10:54

== Personnel ==
- Aaron Stainthorpe – vocals
- Andrew Craighan – guitars
- Hamish Glencross – guitars
- Lena Abé – bass
- Katie Stone – keyboards, violins (on tracks 1 & 4)
- Shaun MacGowan – keyboards, violins (on tracks 2 & 3)
- Dan Mullins – drums
