= The Light at the End of the World (My Dying Bride album) =

Studio album by My Dying Bride
- Released: 1999
- Genre: Death-doom, gothic metal
- Length: 71:11
- Label: Peaceville

My Dying Bride chronology
34.788%...Complete (1998)	The Light at the End of the World (1999)	Meisterwerk 1 (2000)

Professional ratings
Review scores
Source	Rating
Allmusic	4.5/5 stars
Collector's Guide to Heavy Metal	8/10
Metal Hammer	9/10

The Light at the End of the World is the sixth studio album by English doom metal band My Dying Bride, released in 1999. After the more experimental 34.788%...Complete, this album marks a return to the more traditional My Dying Bride doom sound and style of lyrics. It was also the first My Dying Bride release since 1994's The Sexuality of Bereavement to feature growling vocals, although Aaron Stainthorpe has noticeably changed his style and broadened his range. All guitar parts on the album were recorded by Andrew Craighan, following the earlier departure of Calvin Robertshaw. Following Robertshaw's departure, only Craighan and Stainthorpe remained as founding members of the band. Hamish Glencross was soon after recruited as permanent guitarist. The keyboard parts were played by Jonny Maudling of Bal-Sagoth. It is also the first My Dying Bride album to feature the drumming of Shaun Steels, who would remain with the band until 2006.

When the CD was reissued in 2003, it contained no bonus tracks.

== Track listing ==
- All songs written & arranged by My Dying Bride (VILE Music).

No.	Title	Length
1.	"She Is the Dark"	8:26
2.	"Edenbeast"	11:22
3.	"The Night He Died"	6:25
4.	"The Light at the End of the World"	10:35
5.	"The Fever Sea"	4:05
6.	"Into the Lake of Ghosts"	7:08
7.	"The Isis Script"	7:08
8.	"Christliar"	10:30
9.	"Sear Me III"	5:26
Total length:		71:11

== Song information ==
"She Is The Dark" and "The Fever Sea" have become live regulars since this release, each appearing on both The Voice of the Wretched and Sinamorata. "Sear Me III" is the third in a trilogy of songs to bear the title, preceded by the keyboard and violin-only "Sear Me MCMXCIII" in 1993 and "Sear Me" in 1991, which is more similar in style to the third incarnation, being a full band composition.

== Personnel ==
- Aaron Stainthorpe - vocals
- Andrew Craighan - guitars
- Adrian Jackson - bass
- Shaun Taylor-Steels - drums

=== Additional Personnel ===
- Jonny Maudling - keyboards
- Calvin Robertshaw - second guitar on "Sear Me III"
