= An Ode to Woe =

An Ode To Woe

Live album by My Dying Bride
- Released: 28 April 2008
- Recorded: Paradiso; Amsterdam; 20 April 2007
- Genre: Doom metal; gothic metal
- Length: 83:35 (DVD)
- Label: Peaceville

My Dying Bride chronology
A Line of Deathless Kings (2006)	An Ode To Woe (2008)	For Lies I Sire (2009)

An Ode To Woe is the second live album by English doom metal band My Dying Bride. The set contains a live show recorded in Amsterdam on CD and DVD during the band's mini-tour for the album A Line of Deathless Kings. The set marks the second live CD release by the band, and the third on DVD. The show was originally broadcast by website Fabchannel.

An Ode to Woe is the first My Dying Bride release to feature Lena Abé on bass and Dan Mullins on drums.

== Track listing ==
1. To Remain Tombless - 7:43
2. My Hope, The Destroyer - 5:45
3. For You - 6:41
4. The Blue Lotus - 6:33
5. Like Gods of the Sun - 5:21
6. Catherine Blake - 6:18
7. The Cry of Mankind - 6:07
8. The Whore, The Cook and The Mother - 5:42
9. Thy Raven Wings - 5:22
10. The Snow in My Hand - 7:09
11. She Is the Dark - 7:59
12. The Dreadful Hours - 12:55
13. The Forever People (on DVD only) - 5:28

== Credits ==
- Aaron Stainthorpe - vocals
- Andrew Craighan - guitar
- Hamish Glencross - guitar
- Sarah Stanton - keyboards
- Lena Abé - bass
- Dan Mullins - drums
