= A Line of Deathless Kings =

Studio album by My Dying Bride
- Released: 9 October 2006
- Recorded: May–June 2006
- Studio: Academy Studio
- Genres: Doom metal, gothic metal
- Length: 61:10
- Label: Peaceville

My Dying Bride chronology
Sinamorata (2006)	A Line of Deathless Kings (2006)	An Ode to Woe (2008)

Professional ratings
Review scores
Source	Rating
AllMusic	4/5 stars

A Line of Deathless Kings is the ninth studio album by English doom metal band My Dying Bride. It was released on 9 October 2006.

A limited edition of the album comes in a hard clamshell case with a double-sided poster and five postcards, depicting the full-time members of the band. The drummer on this album (John Bennett from the Prophecy) is not included. This is the only album on which he appears. He replaced previous drummer Shaun Steels, who left the band after a repeated leg injury meant he could not drum full-time for fear of worsening his condition. This echoes how Rick Miah left the band in 1997 after falling ill with Crohn's disease. Bennett filled in for Steels for two years until his commitments to the Prophecy became too great to continue drumming for My Dying Bride.

Following the release of the album, and with an imminent return of Steels looking unlikely, Dan Mullins (previously of Thine, Bal-Sagoth, the Axis of Perdition, Sermon of Hypocrisy, Kryokill and others) was recruited by the band as its permanent drummer. Lena Abé also replaced the departed Adrian Jackson on bass.

The album was preceded by the EP Deeper Down on 18 September 2006. The video for "Deeper Down" is featured on the CD version of the album. It was directed by Charlie Granberg, who also directed Katatonia's "My Twin" and "Deliberation" videos.

The album artwork was created by Matthew Vickerstaff.

== Track listing ==
All music is composed by My Dying Bride.

No.	Title	Length
1.	"To Remain Tombless"	6:06
2.	"L'Amour détruit" (French for "The destroyed love" or "Destroyed love," but also for "Love destroys")	9:08
3.	"I Cannot Be Loved"	7:04
4.	"And I Walk with Them"	6:37
5.	"Thy Raven Wings"	5:22
6.	"Love's Intolerable Pain"	6:14
7.	"One of Beauty's Daughters"	5:40
8.	"Deeper Down"	6:28
9.	"The Blood, the Wine, the Roses"	8:21
Total length:		61:10

== Personnel ==
=== My Dying Bride ===
- Aaron Stainthorpe – vocals
- Andrew Craighan – lead guitar
- Hamish Glencross – rhythm guitar
- Adrian Jackson – bass
- Sarah Stanton – keyboards

=== Additional Personnel ===
- John Bennett – drums
