= A Mortal Binding =

2024 studio album by My Dying Bride

Studio album by My Dying Bride
- Released: 19 April 2024
- Recorded: July–September 2023
- Genre: Doom metal; gothic metal; death-doom
- Length: 54:46
- Label: Nuclear Blast
- Producer: Mark Mynett

My Dying Bride chronology
The Ghost of Orion (2020)	A Mortal Binding (2024)

Professional ratings
Review scores
Source	Rating
Blabbermouth.net	8.5/10
Distorted Sound	9/10
Kerrang!	3/5
Metal Hammer	3.5/5 stars
MetalSucks	4/5

A Mortal Binding is the fourteenth (Note: It is the band's fifteenth studio album if including Evinta.) studio album by English doom metal band My Dying Bride. It was released on 19 April 2024 through Nuclear Blast. It is the band's final album with original lead vocalist Aaron Stainthorpe.

== Background ==
The band released the first single of the album, "Thornwyck Hymn", on 9 February 2024. The song is named after the village of Thornwick in the band's home county of Yorkshire. Describing of theme of the song, frontman Aaron Stainthorpe said, "Set upon the rugged coast of Yorkshire, Thornwyck village has spent an eternity being haunted by the chill waters that wash its shore — and the hidden folk who dwell in the salty depths. Woe betide anyone who fares into the briny sea, or even steals too close to its edge for they may never set foot back on mother earth." The single was released with an accompanying music video, directed by Daniel Gray. The album was produced, mixed, and mastered by Mark Mynett, who worked on the band's previous album, The Ghost of Orion. The album was recorded in Manchester at Mynett's Mynetaur Productions studio between July and September 2023.

== Track listing ==
All tracks are written by Andrew Craighan and Aaron Stainthorpe.

A Mortal Binding track listing
No.	Title	Length
1.	"Her Dominion"	6:11
2.	"Thornwyck Hymn"	6:48
3.	"The 2nd of Three Bells"	6:52
4.	"Unthroned Creed"	7:01
5.	"The Apocalyptist"	11:23
6.	"A Starving Heart"	7:29
7.	"Crushed Embers"	9:02
Total length:		54:46

== Personnel ==
- Aaron Stainthorpe – vocals
- Andrew Craighan – guitars
- Neil Blanchett - guitars
- Lena Abé – bass guitar
- Shaun Macgowan – keyboards, violins
- Dan Mullins – drums, percussion

== Charts ==
Chart performance for A Mortal Binding
Chart (2024)	Peak position
Austrian Albums (Ö3 Austria)	18
Belgian Albums (Ultratop Flanders)	108
Belgian Albums (Ultratop Wallonia)	155
German Albums (Offizielle Top 100)	19
Polish Albums (ZPAV)	28
Scottish Albums (OCC)	87
Swiss Albums (Schweizer Hitparade)	27
UK Album Downloads (OCC)	29
UK Independent Albums (OCC)	15
UK Rock & Metal Albums (OCC)	6
