= Feel the Misery =

Studio album by My Dying Bride
- Released: 18 September 2015
- Recorded: October 2014 to January 2015 at Academy Studios, Dewsbury, West Yorkshire
- Genre: Doom metal; gothic metal; death-doom
- Length: 62:37
- Label: Peaceville

My Dying Bride chronology
A Map of All Our Failures (2012)	Feel the Misery (2015)	The Ghost of Orion (2020)

Feel the Misery is the twelfth studio album by English doom metal band My Dying Bride. It was released on 18 September 2015 on Peaceville Records.

== Background ==
The album features the return of guitarist Calvin Robertshaw, replacing Hamish Glencross. Hamish departed amicably to focus on his other band, Vallenfyre. Andrew Craighan, the principal songwriter for the album, observed that he felt "a brand new freedom" during the creative process. He explained further his sense of creative freedom: "To give some insight into the mentality behind this album, once I started writing, I just thought, I'm going to write music I like. If it fails, I'll take the slings and arrows."

Craighan has stated the album is, contrary to the title, not the most miserable album in the band's discography, suggesting that it was distinguished by "stronger more direct songs, more hints of death doom through fog-cloaked slithering ambience. It's a more colourful record even if they are mostly hints of colour that's actually bleakness." Craighan noted that "the album title is probably being misunderstood" and clarified that

It’s not My Dying Bride that’s saying Feel The Misery, it’s a statement of society in general. Our jailers are being exposed for what they are and in an attempt to keep control, we have more conflict, more division, more hate and lies. None of it is actually necessary. Feel The Misery is actually a question designed to provoke (probably naively) a thought as to why it’s like this, have anyone of us actually thought who benefits from bombing each other constantly for example? Follow the money and it becomes pretty clear who’s in charge and who benefits from the division.

== Reception ==
Professional ratings
Review scores
Source	Rating
AllMusic	4/5 stars
Metal Injection	positive
Loudwire	positive
musicOMH	4/5 stars
Exclaim!	(8/10)

Feel the Misery received generally positive reviews. Greg Pratt of Exclaim!, Sam Shepherd of musicOMH and Chad Bowar of Loudwire all described the album as a following the band's formula. Pratt wrote that "All told, there are no big surprises here, which is great: My Dying Bride rule at what they do, and this is a very well executed, classy, and moving doom album. " Shepherd emphasized the album as "deliver[ing] an album that cements their reputation." Bowar commented that "The band doesn’t stray far from their comfort zone on the album, and that works very well for them."

Reviewers awarded a large amount of praise to the opening track, "And My Father Left Forever," with James Zalucky of Metal Injection calling the track "surprisingly energetic and bouncy" and Thom Jurek of AllMusic remarking that the track "is a showcase for the band's signature dual-guitar sonics and Aaron Stainthorpe's clean vocals.

== Track listing ==
No.	Title	Length
1.	"And My Father Left Forever"	9:22
2.	"To Shiver in Empty Halls"	9:46
3.	"A Cold New Curse"	9:02
4.	"Feel the Misery"	6:20
5.	"A Thorn of Wisdom"	5:04
6.	"I Celebrate Your Skin"	6:53
7.	"I Almost Loved You"	5:28
8.	"Within a Sleeping Forest"	10:42
Total length:		62:37

== Personnel ==
- Calvin Robertshaw – guitars
- Andrew Craighan – guitars
- Aaron Stainthorpe – vocals
- Lena Abé – bass
- Shaun Macgowan – keyboards, violins
- Dan Mullins - drums, percussion

== Charts ==
Chart (2015)	Peak position
Austrian Albums (Ö3 Austria)	72
Belgian Albums (Ultratop Flanders)	60
Belgian Albums (Ultratop Wallonia)	183
Dutch Albums (Album Top 100)	35
Finnish Albums (Suomen virallinen lista)	33
French Albums (SNEP)	172
German Albums (Offizielle Top 100)	57
