= Songs of Darkness, Words of Light =

Studio album by My Dying Bride
- Released: 23 February 2004
- Recorded: 2003
- Genre: Doom metal; gothic metal; death-doom
- Length: 59:13
- Label: Peaceville

My Dying Bride chronology
The Voice of the Wretched (2002)	Songs of Darkness, Words of Light (2004)	Anti-Diluvian Chronicles (2005)

Professional ratings
Review scores
Source	Rating
Allmusic	4/5 stars
BraveWords	7.5/10 stars
Chronicles of Chaos	9/10
Metal.de	9/10
Release Magazine	7/10

Songs of Darkness, Words of Light is the eighth studio album by English doom metal band My Dying Bride. This album marks the debut of keyboardist Sarah Stanton. Initial copies of the album came in a hard clamshell case and featured a double sided poster and a fridge magnet as extras. This tradition was continued for the next album, A Line of Deathless Kings.

== Track listing ==
No.	Title	Length
1.	"The Wreckage of My Flesh"	8:45
2.	"The Scarlet Garden"	7:49
3.	"Catherine Blake"	6:32
4.	"My Wine in Silence"	5:53
5.	"The Prize of Beauty"	8:02
6.	"The Blue Lotus"	6:33
7.	"And My Fury Stands Ready"	7:45
8.	"A Doomed Lover"	7:54
Total length:		59:13

== Credits ==
- Aaron Stainthorpe – vocals
- Andrew Craighan – guitar
- Hamish Glencross – guitar
- Adrian Jackson – bass
- Sarah Stanton – keyboards
- Shaun Taylor-Steels – drums
