= Evinta =

2011 album by My Dying Bride

Studio album / Remix album by My Dying Bride
- Released: 30 May 2011
- Recorded: 2010–2011 at Waylands Forge Studios
- Genre: Neoclassical dark wave; dark ambient
- Length: 128:47
- Label: Peaceville
- Producer: Jonny Maudling; Andrew Craighan; Aaron Stainthorpe

My Dying Bride chronology
Bring Me Victory (2009)	Evinta (2011)	The Barghest O' Whitby (2011)

Evinta is an album by My Dying Bride released in 2011. It is a development of many of the My Dying Bride's older musical themes and riffs, which were re-written for a variety of classical instruments, rather than the traditional metal music instruments; these riffs were combined with new vocals and musics written and arranged by Jonny Maudling (songwriter/keyboard player of Kull and Bal-Sagoth) based on the band's key works, thus creating a release characteristic of both a studio album and a remix album.

== Release information ==
=== Conception and production ===
"Evinta. A project almost 15 years in the making. An idea that has sat smoldering and never really had a reason to burn alive until now. 9 albums worth of darkness recreated anew to mark 20 years of MDB. Music arranged to the soundscapes of sorrows past. Finally the 20th anniversary allows us to release this music in a form it has been desperately, woefully waiting for. Enjoy the Darkness."

My Dying Bride press release, 5 April 2011

=== Format ===
Evinta was released in three separate formats: jewel case, limited edition and deluxe edition.

The jewel case and limited editions both contained discs one and two, with the limited edition coming in digipak format with a 24-page booklet and being shipped to independent retailers only, compared with the jewel case being for general retail.

The deluxe edition came with a 64-page, 12-inch hardback book and the third disk. Music from the third disk, however, is intended to be released separately in due course.

The book and booklet both contained pictures from My Dying Bride's history, with a brief paragraph for every major release, as well as lyrics. However, the booklet missed out certain lyrics, and the deluxe edition removed the paragraph for the album The Light at the End of the World.

=== Quotations ===
"In Your Dark Pavilion" recycles fragments of "A Kiss to Remember" and "For My Fallen Angel" from Like Gods of the Sun, and "From Darkest Skies" from The Angel and the Dark River.

"Of Lilies Bent With Tears" is based on "Your River" from Turn Loose the Swans.

"That Dress And Summer Skin" recycles the lyrics from "My Wine In Silence" from Songs of Darkness, Words of Light.

The opening lines of "The Music of Flesh" are borrowed from "The Crown Of Sympathy" from Turn Loose the Swans, while the ending of "Seven Times She Wept" quote "Sear Me MCMXCIII" from the same album.

== Track listing ==
Disc one

1. In Your Dark Pavilion — 10:03
2. You Are Not the One Who Loves Me — 6:47
3. Of Lilies Bent with Tears — 7:10
4. The Distance, Busy with Shadows — 10:46
5. Of Sorry Eyes in March — 10:35

Disc two

1. Vanité Triomphante — 12:22
2. That Dress and Summer Skin — 9:39
3. And Then You Go — 9:22
4. A Hand of Awful Rewards — 10:21

Disc three (deluxe edition bonus disc)

1. The Music of Flesh — 7:05
2. Seven Times She Wept — 4:06
3. The Burning Coast of Regnum Italicum — 11:50
4. She Heard My Body Dying — 8:31
5. And All Their Joy Was Drowned — 10:15

== Credits ==
- Andrew Craighan - arrangement and musical direction
- Aaron Stainthorpe — male vocals
- Jonny Maudling — piano and keyboards and Producer
- Lucie Roche — female vocals
- Alice Pembroke — viola
- Johan Baum — cello

== Charts ==
Chart (2011)	Peak position
Finnish Albums (Suomen virallinen lista)	48
