= A Map of All Our Failures =

Studio album by My Dying Bride
- Released: 15 October 2012
- Recorded: Futureworks Studios, Manchester, UK
- Genre: Doom metal; gothic metal
- Length: 63:45
- Label: Peaceville
- Producer: Robert 'Mags' Magoolagan

My Dying Bride chronology
Evinta (2011)	A Map of All Our Failures (2012)	The Manuscript (2013)

Professional ratings
Review scores
Source	Rating
About.com	4.5/5 stars
Decibel Magazine	5/10 stars
Popmatters	7/10 stars

A Map of All Our Failures is the eleventh studio album by English doom metal band My Dying Bride, released on 15 October 2012 via Peaceville Records. Limited editions include a bonus track and a DVD featuring a 70-minute documentary, An Evening With the Bride. The cover artwork is by Rhett Podersoo.

== Musical style ==
Vocalist Aaron Stainthorpe described the album as being similar to the band's previous effort, For Lies I Sire, but said that the music had evolved. He described the lyrics as being about religion, passion, love and loss. Bassist Lena Abé described the album as being a "new style of writing, done in an old way", and almost having a "live sound" due to the presence of feedback and "raw and rough" elements. Guitarist Andrew Craighan described the album as "a controlled demolition of all your hopes".

== Track listing ==
All lyrics are written by Aaron Stainthorpe; all music is composed by My Dying Bride.

No.	Title	Length
1.	"Kneel till Doomsday"	7:52
2.	"The Poorest Waltz"	5:08
3.	"A Tapestry Scorned"	8:00
4.	"Like a Perpetual Funeral"	8:32
5.	"A Map of All Our Failures"	7:53
6.	"Hail Odysseus"	8:54
7.	"Within the Presence of Absence"	8:50
8.	"Abandoned as Christ"	8:39
Total length:		63:45

Special edition bonus track
No.	Title	Length
9.	"My Faults Are Your Reward"	5:28

== Personnel ==
My Dying Bride

- Aaron Stainthorpe – vocals
- Andrew Craighan – guitars
- Hamish Glencross – guitars
- Lena Abé – bass
- Shaun Macgowan – keyboards, violins

=== Additional musicians ===
- Shaun Taylor Steels – drums

== Charts ==
Charts (2012)	Peak position
Belgian Albums (Ultratop Flanders)	137
Belgian Albums (Ultratop Wallonia)	118
Finnish Albums (Suomen virallinen lista)	39
French Albums (SNEP)	181
German Albums (Offizielle Top 100)	82
UK Albums (OCC)	200
