= Unreleased Bitterness =

Single by My Dying Bride
- Released: 27 April 1993
- Recorded: 1991
- Genre: Doom metal, death metal
- Length: 7:49
- Label: Unbridled Voyage
- Songwriter(s): Adrian Jackson * Aaron Stainthorpe * Andrew Craighan * Calvin Robertshaw
- Producer(s): My Dying Bride

My Dying Bride singles chronology
"Unreleased Bitterness" (1993)	"The Sexuality of Bereavement" (1993)

"Unreleased Bitterness" is a song by English doom metal band My Dying Bride. The track contained in this release is an early rehearsal recording of the song "The Bitterness and the Bereavement", which appeared on As the Flower Withers.

This 7" was released by a friend of the band with full permission on the Unbridled Voyage label. Only 1,150 copies were produced. It was pressed on a one-sided flexi disc, likely to save costs. In recent years, the manufacturer of the record revealed on the band's message board that he still had a fair few of them "in a box, under the bed", without sleeves.

== Track listing ==
1. "The Bitterness and the Bereavement" – 7:49

== Personnel ==
- Aaron Stainthorpe - vocals
- Andrew Craighan - guitar, bass
- Calvin Robertshaw - guitar
- Rick Miah - drums
