= The Ghost of Orion =

2020 studio album by My Dying Bride

Studio album by My Dying Bride
- Released: 6 March 2020
- Recorded: 2018–2019
- Genre: Doom metal; gothic metal; death-doom
- Length: 56:06
- Label: Nuclear Blast
- Producer: Mark Mynett

My Dying Bride chronology
Feel the Misery (2015)	The Ghost of Orion (2020)	Macabre Cabaret (2020)

The Ghost of Orion is the thirteenth (Note: It is the band's fourteenth studio album if including Evinta.) studio album by English doom metal band My Dying Bride. It was released on 6 March 2020 through Nuclear Blast.

== Background ==
The album is the band's first with new member Jeff Singer, replacing Shaun Taylor-Steels who departed due to "unresolvable drumming issues". Aaron Stainthorpe's five-year-old daughter was diagnosed with cancer a couple years after the release of the band's previous album Feel the Misery, from which she was later declared in remission.

Mark Mynett is the producer and studio engineer for the album and Jo Quail performs cello on some songs.

The album's first single, "Your Broken Shore", was released on 20 January, followed by a second single, "Tired of Tears", on 7 February, and finally a third single with accompanying music video directed by Hal Sinden of Eulogy Media Ltd. on 9 March.

== Reception ==
Professional ratings
Aggregate scores
Source	Rating
Metacritic	81/100
Review scores
Source	Rating
AllMusic	4/5 stars
Brave Words & Bloody Knuckles	9/10 stars
Kerrang!	4/5 stars
Metal Storm	(6.0/10)

The Ghost of Orion received generally positive reviews. At Metacritic, which assigns a weighted average rating out of 100 to reviews from mainstream publications, the album received an average score of 81, based on four reviews.

Thom Jurek of AllMusic wrote a positive review, remarking that "The Ghost of Orion was born in the aftermath of strife, strain, and fear; but these are balanced by gratitude, endurance, and even benevolence; the conflicting tensions exist with no attempt to alleviate them, and all of these qualities are among the many reasons My Dying Bride has, for more than three decades, reigned at the pinnacle of doom metal."

New Noise Magazine, in an article detailing an interview with Stainthorpe, described him as having "one of his most impressive vocal performances to date".

== Track listing ==
The Ghost of Orion track listing
No.	Title	Length
1.	"Your Broken Shore"	7:40
2.	"To Outlive the Gods"	7:55
3.	"Tired of Tears"	8:35
4.	"The Solace"	5:50
5.	"The Long Black Land"	9:59
6.	"The Ghost of Orion"	3:29
7.	"The Old Earth"	10:30
8.	"Your Woven Shore"	2:08
Total length:		56:06

== Personnel ==
- Aaron Stainthorpe – vocals
- Andrew Craighan – all guitars
- Lena Abé – bass guitar
- Shaun Macgowan – keyboards, violins
- Jeff Singer – drums, percussion

=== Additional personnel ===
- Jo Quail – cello
- Lindy-Fay Hella – vocals on "The Solace"

== Charts ==
Sales chart performance for The Ghost of Orion
Chart (2020)	Peak position
Austrian Albums (Ö3 Austria)	22
Belgian Albums (Ultratop Flanders)	107
Belgian Albums (Ultratop Wallonia)	160
Finnish Albums (Suomen virallinen lista)	34
French Albums (SNEP)	172
German Albums (Offizielle Top 100)	12
Hungarian Albums (MAHASZ)	27
Polish Albums (ZPAV)	34
Spanish Albums (PROMUSICAE)	35
Swiss Albums (Schweizer Hitparade)	19
