= Turn Loose the Swans =

Studio album by My Dying Bride
- Released: 11 October 1993
- Recorded: June–July 1993
- Genres: Death-doom; doom metal
- Length: 58:15
- Label: Peaceville
- Producers: Robert 'Mags' Magoolagan, My Dying Bride

My Dying Bride chronology
The Thrash of Naked Limbs (1993)	Turn Loose the Swans (1993)	The Angel and the Dark River (1995)

Turn Loose the Swans is the second studio album by English doom metal band My Dying Bride, released in 1993.

It marked a radical departure from the band's first full-length, As the Flower Withers. Martin Powell's violin playing had become fully integrated into the band's sound, whilst vocalist Aaron Stainthorpe mixed death metal growls and grunts with the spoken word and an often plaintive singing voice. The first ("Sear Me MCMXCIII") and final ("Black God") tracks dispensed with guitars, bass and drums altogether, while the album was also far slower and longer than its predecessor. For these reasons, Turn Loose the Swans is often considered to be important in the development of the death-doom sound My Dying Bride helped pioneer and also foreshadows the gothic metal elements that would dominate their subsequent albums.

Though far from straightforward, Aaron Stainthorpe's lyrics were much less complex than those employed on As the Flower Withers. He explicitly addressed themes such as anti-Christianity and lovelorn longing. "Black God" took its lyrics from the last eight lines of a poem called "Ah! The Shepherd's Mournful Fate" by the 18th-century Scottish poet William Hamilton.

The artwork for the release was designed and created by Aaron Stainthorpe and Andrew Craighan.

== Music ==
Chris Chantler of Metal Hammer said that the album "ratchet[s] the still-embryonic strains of gothic doom/death with a monochrome rainbow of visionary, eccentric flamboyance. [...] Yet for all the surreal romantic lyricism, plaintive violin and lovelorn crooning, it still manages to be distinguished by monstrous riffs."

== Song information ==
- "Sear Me MCMXCIII" was the second in a trilogy of songs to bear the title, preceded by the doom-metal orientated "Sear Me" in 1992 and followed by "Sear Me III" in 1999, which is similar in style to the original, being a full band composition. The version on this album however, features only the vocals of Aaron Stainthorpe and the keyboards and violin of Martin Powell. It also features different lyrics to the other two versions.
- A video was made for "The Songless Bird" which features slow motion footage of the band running through wilderness, at this stage becoming something of a tradition. The video can be found on "For Darkest Eyes".
- A remix of "The Crown Of Sympathy" was featured on the band's third single, "I Am the Bloody Earth". This version of the song featured more echoing effects, a shorter outro and a heavy emphasis on Rick Miah's drum sound.
- The 2003 reissue of the album featured as bonus tracks; "Le Cerf Malade", an instrumental from "The Thrash Of Naked Limbs", "Transcending (Into The Exquisite)", a remix of songs from this album taken from the later EP "I Am the Bloody Earth", and a live performance of "Your Shameful Heaven" from the bonus CD of "The Angel and the Dark River".
- Live versions of songs from this album can be found on "For Darkest Eyes" (all songs except "Black God") and "The Voice of the Wretched" (Turn Loose The Swans, The Snow In My Hand and Your River).

== Reception ==
Professional ratings
Review scores
Source	Rating
AllMusic	4/5 stars
Collector's Guide to Heavy Metal	8/10
Rolling Stone	4/5 stars

Professional reviews:

- Rolling Stone (#681, 05/05/94) - "Turn Loose the Swans is Bram Stoker's Dracula for the ears – diving into melodrama with grace and making that aspect of life seem the only part worth living. My Dying Bride take a sickly view of traditional orchestration, coupling it with Aaron's wounded-and-pissed animal groans and growls. Poison line each precious flower petal, as if the band were Laura Ashley's evil twin. Disconsolate guitars and funereal passion – in short, music all too susceptible to adjectives but compelling nonetheless."

In October 2011 it was awarded a gold certification from the Independent Music Companies Association which indicated sales of at least 75,000 copies throughout Europe.

== Track listing ==
- All Songs Written & Arranged By My Dying Bride (VILE Music Publishing)

No.	Title	Length
1.	"Sear Me MCMXCIII"	7:24
2.	"Your River"	9:24
3.	"The Songless Bird"	7:00
4.	"The Snow in My Hand"	7:08
5.	"The Crown of Sympathy"	12:15
6.	"Turn Loose the Swans"	10:08
7.	"Black God"	4:52
Total length:		58:11

=== Bonus tracks on the 2003 reissue ===
1. "Le Cerf Malade" – 6:31
2. "Transcending (Into the Exquisite)" – 8:39
3. "Your Shameful Heaven (live)" – 5:56

== Personnel ==
- Aaron Stainthorpe - vocals
- Andrew Craighan - guitar
- Calvin Robertshaw - guitar
- Adrian Jackson - bass
- Martin Powell - violin, keyboard
- Rick Miah - drums

=== Additional personnel ===
- Zena: Female Vocals on "Black God"

== Production ==
- Produced By My Dying Bride & Robert Magoolagan
- Recorded & Engineered By Robert Magoolagan
- Mastered By Noel Summerville
