= Like Gods of the Sun =

Studio album by My Dying Bride
- Released: 14 October 1996
- Recorded: 1996
- Genres: Doom metal; gothic metal
- Length: 54:10
- Label: Peaceville

My Dying Bride chronology
Trinity (1995)	Like Gods of the Sun (1996)	34.788%...Complete (1998)

Professional ratings
Review scores
Source	Rating
AllMusic	3/5 stars
Collector's Guide to Heavy Metal	9/10

Like Gods of the Sun is the fourth studio album by English doom metal band My Dying Bride released in October 1996, and the last album by the band to feature Rick Miah, who left the band in 1997, on drums and Martin Powell on keyboards and violins.

Like its predecessor The Angel and the Dark River this album has completely clean vocals.

A video was filmed for "For You" and appears on the VHS and DVD of For Darkest Eyes.

Singer Aaron Stainthorpe has stated many times that this is his favorite MDB album. The track "A Kiss To Remember" has become a regular in the band's live setlist.

The song "For My Fallen Angel" is strictly an orchestral composition with sections of violin and synth, and has an extract from a poem called Venus and Adonis by the English poet and playwright William Shakespeare.

The Japanese and limited digipak editions of the album feature the bonus remix "It Will Come (Nightmare)". This track was included on the 2003 reissue of the album alongside an additional remix of the song "Grace Unhearing", credited as "Portishell Mix". The song was thus named as Stainthorpe was at the time a big fan of the British band Portishead. The band would later perform a cover of the Portishead song "Roads" for the Peaceville Records anniversary compilation "Peaceville X". The cover artwork was designed by Andy Green.

In October 2011, it was awarded a gold certification from the Independent Music Companies Association which indicated sales of at least 75,000 copies throughout Europe.

== Track listing ==
No.	Title	Length
1.	"Like Gods of the Sun"	5:41
2.	"The Dark Caress"	5:58
3.	"Grace Unhearing"	7:19
4.	"A Kiss to Remember"	7:31
5.	"All Swept Away"	4:17
6.	"For You"	6:37
7.	"It Will Come"	4:27
8.	"Here in the Throat"	6:22
9.	"For My Fallen Angel"	5:55

Digipak edition bonus tracks
No.	Title	Length
10.	"It Will Come (Nightmare)"	5:36
11.	"Grace Unhearing (Portishell Mix)"	7:05

== Credits ==
- Aaron Stainthorpe - vocals
- Andrew Craighan - guitar
- Calvin Robertshaw - guitar
- Adrian Jackson - bass
- Martin Powell - violin, keyboard
- Rick Miah - drums

== Charts ==
Charts (1996)	Peak position
Finnish Albums (Suomen virallinen lista)	33
UK Albums (OCC)	131
