= The Voice of the Wretched =

Live album by My Dying Bride
- Released: 21 May 2002
- Recorded: 4 March 2001
- Genre: Doom metal; gothic metal
- Length: 74:57
- Label: Peaceville

My Dying Bride chronology
The Dreadful Hours (2001)	The Voice of the Wretched (2002)	Songs of Darkness, Words of Light (2004)

Professional ratings
Review scores
Source	Rating
Allmusic	3/5 stars

The Voice of the Wretched is the first live album by English doom metal band My Dying Bride, recorded in Tilburg, the Netherlands on the 4 March 2001. Original pressings of the album had tracks 2 and 4 listed in the wrong order, and "Turn Loose The Swans" was spelled "TRUN Loose The Swans".

== Track listing ==
1. "She Is the Dark" – 8:40
2. "Turn Loose the Swans" – 10:02
3. "The Cry of Mankind" – 6:33
4. "The Snow in My Hand" – 6:33
5. "A Cruel Taste of Winter" – 6:52
6. "Under Your Wings and into Your Arms" – 5:28
7. "A Kiss to Remember" – 6:55
8. "Your River" – 9:06
9. "The Fever Sea" – 4:13
10. "Symphonaire Infernus et Spera Empyrium" – 10:35

== Personnel ==
- Aaron Stainthorpe - vocals, artwork
- Andrew Craighan - guitar
- Hamish Glencross - guitar
- Adrian Jackson - bass
- Shaun Taylor-Steels - drums
- Yasmin Ahmed - keyboards
