= Dominion (British band) =

British death metal band

Dominion was a British band from Thornhill, Dewsbury, that played a mix of death metal and doom metal genres. It featured a female singer, Michelle Richfield, and two male singers, Mass Firth and Arno Cagna. The band released two albums in the late 1990s on Peaceville Records and then split up. Drummer Bill Law temporarily played in My Dying Bride. Richfield and North later formed the band Sear. Firth now plays in the death metal band Nailed. In 2006 their former record label Peaceville decided to release an 18 track compilation album entitled Threshold A Retrospective. This featured songs from the albums Interface and Blackout, in addition to songs that were earlier released on the Under the Sign of the Sacred Star Peaceville compilation album. A version of the Tears For Fears song "Shout", originally released on the Peaceville X album, was awarded KKKK (out of a possible 5K's) review in Kerrang! magazine, hailing the band as "Brit Metal Pioneers and a criminally overlooked band". Furthermore, the track Release which originally featured on the album Blackout was to appear on a cover mount CD for the magazine Metal Hammer.

== Members ==
- Michelle Richfield – vocals
- Mass Firth – vocals, guitar
- Arno Cagna – vocals, guitar
- Danny North – bass
- Bill Law – drums

== Discography ==
- Interface (CD, 1996)
- Blackout (CD, 1997)
- Threshold – a Retrospective (Compilation CD, 2006)
