= The Axis of Perdition =

British industrial black metal band

- Also known as: Axis of Perdition (2001-2004); The Axis of Perdition (2004-2013); An Axis of Perdition (2019-present)
- Origin: Middlesbrough, England
- Genres: Black metal; industrial metal; dark ambient
- Years active: 2001–2013, 2019–present
- Labels: Code666; Rage of Achilles
- Members: Mike Blenkarn; Ian Fenwick; Dan Mullins; Les Simpson; Brooke Johnson

The Axis of Perdition are a British industrial black metal band from Middlesbrough, England. They are signed to Code666 Records.

The band had roots in the group Mine(thorn) and consisted of Tetsuo Unit BRJ (a.k.a. Brooke Johnson, vocals, guitars, bass and programming) and Test Subject MGB (a.k.a. Michael Blenkarn, guitars, keyboards and programming).

== Music ==
The Axis of Perdition's musical output consists of black metal experimentation with industrial music and dark ambient textures. Their debut album states that "Axis of Perdition plays something there isn't words for yet (exclusively)".

Their sound is primarily based on distorted guitars with black metal vocals, programmed drums, and discordant sound effects including screams and static. The black metal aspects of the music are digitally distorted, interspersed with atmospheric soundscapes formed by synthesizers and field recordings. The Axis of Perdition's tracks tend to feature shifting free-form arrangements that lack a typical verse-chorus structure and tend toward lengthiness (one such track, from Deleted Scenes from the Transition Hospital, is over twelve minutes long).

The band tags inspiration from H. P. Lovecraft, Ramsey Campbell and the Silent Hill games (their EP Physical Illucinations in the Sewer of Xuchilbara is named for the dark deity of the games) as well themes of urban decay and mental illness, The Axis of Perdition are often compared to groups like Anaal Nathrakh and Blut Aus Nord for their similar grim, urban industrial metal aesthetics.

In 2013, the group separated due to a mutual agreement between Blenkarn and Johnson, but reunited in 2019 under the name An Axis of Perdition.

== Line-up ==
- Brooke Johnson – vocals, jazz guitar, ambience (also member of the bands Mine(thorn), Halo of the Sun, Pulsefear, Hesper Payne, Nord, Irradiant and Monument)
- Michael Blenkarn – lead and rhythm guitar, keyboards, programming, ambience (also member of the bands Wodensthrone and Phaleg)
- Ian Fenwick – ambience (also member of the band Mine(thorn) and Hesper Payne)
- Dan Mullins – live drums, percussion (Also a member of The Raven Theory, ex-Bal-Sagoth, and My Dying Bride, amongst others)
- Leslie Simpson – narration, vocals

== Discography ==
- Corridors (Split with Pulsefear, 2002)
- The Ichneumon Method (And Less Welcome Techniques) (album, 2003)
- Physical Illucinations in the Sewer of Xuchilbara (The Red God) (EP, 2004)
- Deleted Scenes from the Transition Hospital (album, 2005)
- Urfe (album, 2008)
- Tenements (of the Anointed Flesh) (album, 2011)
- Apertures (album, 2024)
