= Blackout (Dominion album) =

Studio album by Dominion
- Released: 1998
- Genre: Death metal Doom metal
- Label: Peaceville

Dominion chronology
Interface (1996)	Blackout (1998)

Blackout is the second album by the British band Dominion.

== Track listing ==
1. Blackout – 4:12
2. Release – 4:15
3. Covet – 4:10
4. Distortion – 4:12
5. Ill Effect – 4:26
6. Today's Tomorrow – 4:31
7. Down – 3:58
8. Prism – 3:05
9. Threshold – 4:27
10. Unseen – 3:18
11. Fuelling Nothing – 3:44

== Credits ==
- Michelle Richfield - vocals
- Mass Firth - vocals, guitar
- Arno Cagna - vocals, guitar
- Danny North - bass
- Bill Law - drums
