= Dan Mullins =

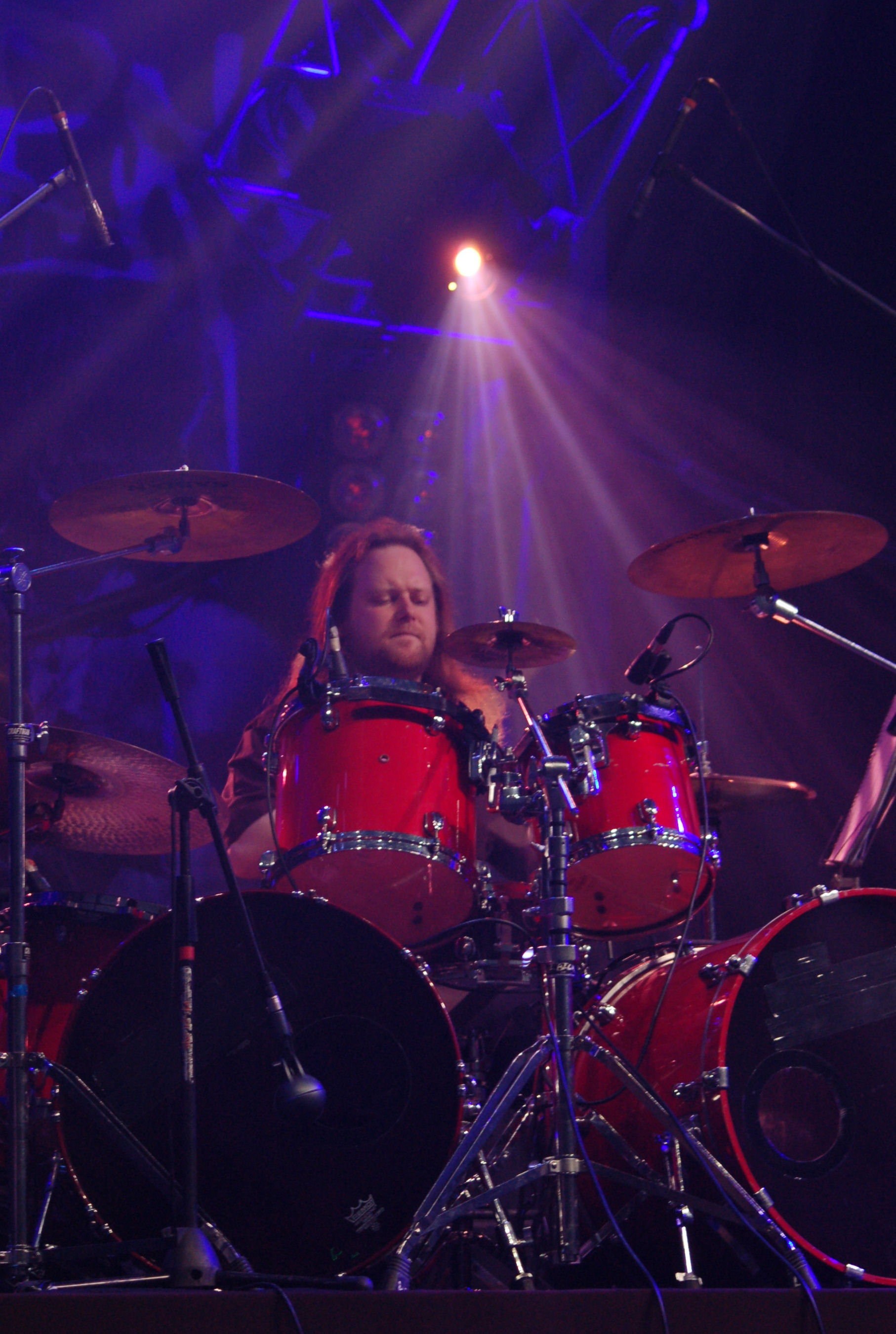
- Mullins with My Dying Bride in 2007

Background information
- Born: 15 June 1978 (age 48)
- Origin: Dewsbury United Kingdom
- Genres: Doom metal, black metal, death metal, symphonic metal, dark ambient, thrash metal, progressive metal
- Occupation: Musician
- Instrument: Drums
- Label: Peaceville
- Member of: The Axis of Perdition; My Dying Bride
- Formerly of: Bal-Sagoth; Code

Dan Mullins (born 15 June 1978) is an English metal drummer. He is most known for being the drummer of the doom metal band My Dying Bride. Mullins has cited drummers such as Buddy Rich, Mike Portnoy, Sean Reinert, and Paul Mazurkiewicz as influences.

== Discography ==
=== Ephitaph ===
- Inscriptions (1994 demo)
- Unearthed (1995 demo)

=== Broken ===
- Velvet dune (1996 demo)
- Skytorn (1997 album)

=== Thine ===
- Journeys (1996 demo)
- The Blue Tape (1997 demo)
- A Town Like This (1998 album)
- In Therapy (2001 album)

=== Sermon of Hypocrisy ===
- To Burn What He Creates (2001 demo)
- Masochistic Discipline (2003 demo)

=== The Axis of Perdition ===
- Deleted Scenes from the Transition Hospital (2005 album)
- Urfe (2009 album)
- Tenements of the Anointed Flesh (2011 album)

=== KryoKill ===
- The Soul Agenda (2006 demo)

=== Bal-Sagoth ===
- The Chthonic Chronicles (2006 album)

=== My Dying Bride ===
- An Ode to Woe (2008 live album)
- For Lies I Sire (2009 album)
- Bring Me Victory (2009 EP)
- Feel The Misery (2015 album)
- A Mortal Binding (2024 album)

== Other work ==
Dan stood in for Chthonic's drummer at Bloodstock 2012.
