= Shaun MacGowan =

British violinist, keyboardist and guitarist

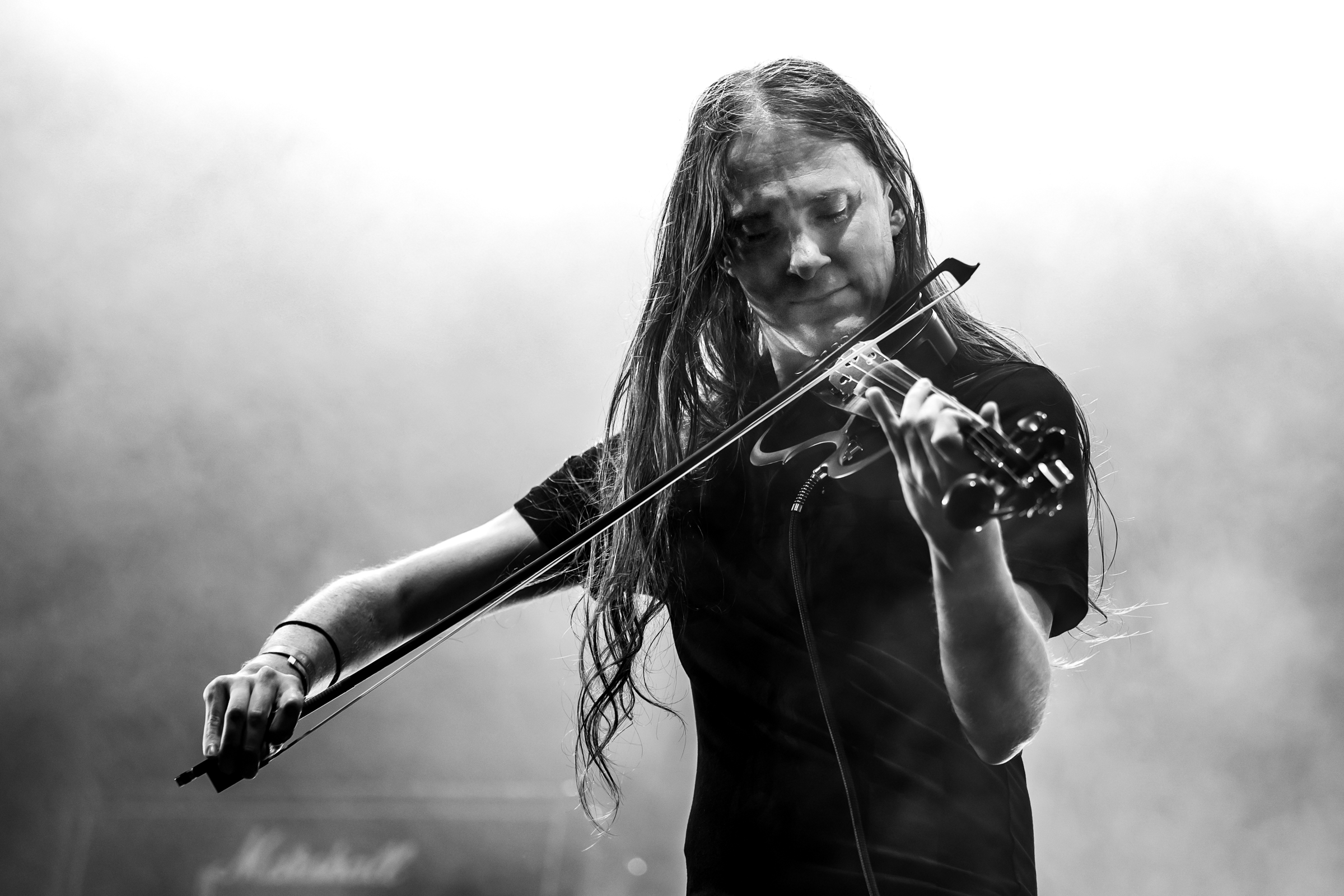
- MacGowan in 2023

Background information
- Born: 13 May 1988 (age 37)
- Origin: Dewsbury, England, UK
- Genres: Doom metal, classical, new-age
- Occupation: Musician
- Instruments: Violin keyboards Guitars

Shaun MacGowan (born 13 May 1988) is an English violinist, keyboardist and guitarist, best known as the keyboardist and violinist of British doom metal band My Dying Bride. He replaced Katie Stone in 2009, and joined the band to tour the album For Lies I Sire. His first studio appearance with the group came on the 2009 EP Bring Me Victory, on which he played two tracks.

Shaun was a member of British death metal band Narcotic Death, joining on guitar to complete the band's original gigging line-up in 2008, appearing on the band's self-titled demo EP (2008) and album Anthology of the Damned (2010). He left in late 2010.

In 2011, MacGowan appeared on My Dying Bride's The Barghest O' Whitby, playing both violin and keyboard, with "genuine aggression". In contrast, his violin in 2024's A Mortal Binding has been described as "solemnly sweet strings" and "devastating".

== Equipment ==
- Yamaha Violins
- Korg Keyboards
- Schecter Guitars
- EMG Pickups

== Discography ==
=== With Narcotic Death ===
- Narcotic Death (EP, 2008)
- Anthology of the Damned (full-length, 2010)

=== With My Dying Bride ===
- Bring Me Victory (EP, 2009)
- Evinta (full-length, 2011)
- The Barghest O' Whitby (EP, 2011)
- A Map of All Our Failures (full-length, 2012)
- Feel The Misery (2015 album)
- The Ghost of Orion (2020 album)
- A Mortal Binding (2024 album)
