= The Angel and the Dark River =

- Original artwork

Studio album by My Dying Bride
- Released: 15 May 1995
- Recorded: December 1994 – January 1995
- Studio: Academy
- Genre: Doom metal; gothic metal
- Length: 52:14
- Label: Peaceville
- Producer: Robert 'Mags' Magoolagan, My Dying Bride

My Dying Bride chronology
Turn Loose the Swans (1994)	The Angel and the Dark River (1995)	Trinity (1995)

Professional ratings
Review scores
Source	Rating
Allmusic	4.5/5 stars
Collector's Guide to Heavy Metal	9/10

The Angel and the Dark River is the third studio album by English doom metal band My Dying Bride. The 1996 re-release contains one bonus track "The Sexuality of Bereavement" and a bonus CD titled Live at the Dynamo. The Live CD was recorded during their appearance at the Dynamo Festival in 1995.

Aaron Stainthorpe's lyrics continued in the vein of Turn Loose the Swans, focusing on religious symbolism and relationship problems. Stainthorpe has said in many interviews that "Two Winters Only" is his favourite My Dying Bride song.

Five of the album's six tracks appear on the band's VHS and DVD For Darkest Eyes.

== Production ==
For the first time in the band's history, guitar player Andrew Craighan was the sole composer of a My Dying Bride record, which was considered “strange” to the guitarist. Many song ideas for The Angel and the Dark River were completed during the recording of the album at Academy Studios. Craighan cites "The Cry of Mankind" as an example: "we had the vocals, we had that guitar line [Calvin Robertshaw's repetitive arpeggio background guitar], we had the drums and the bass. The other guitar line, the heavier guitar line, was non-existent."

== Musical style ==
The Angel and the Dark River was arguably the release that saw the band travel furthest from their death metal origins. Aaron Stainthorpe dispensed with his death grunt entirely, and Martin Powell's violin and keyboard playing now seemed to be the basis around which the rest of the arrangement was built. Apart from the final track of the original release ("Your Shameful Heaven"), the tempo was unremittingly slow.

== Themes ==
This water-charged inspiration comes from their home, the north of England. Andrew Craighan said that they "subscribe very much to the ideas of the mist and the fog and the castles. All of that typical English stuff. Constantly fucking raining. And it's just always bleak here. It's always cold. It's always miserable. We actually kind of enjoy that in a sick way, so to write about it and to sing about it is nothing new."

== Touring and promotion ==
According to Peaceville label founder Paul "Hammy" Halmshaw, My Dying Bride "were at the height of their powers" after the release of The Angel and the Dark River. Peaceville later on reissued the record in a limited double-CD edition, featuring an alternate cover scheme and an extra disc with their 1995 Dynamo Open Air live performance. About the concert, MDB guitarist Andrew Craighan revealed:

We enjoyed it a lot, but it was our first gig after six months, so we were rusty. Rehearsing in a rehearsal room is one thing, but in front of 3500 people or more, suddenly you're not sure how to play the songs in a live environment. That's the importance of playing warm-up shows. We learned valuable lessons that night, but it wasn't the ideal place for that!

My Dying Bride were invited by Steve Harris to be the opening band of Iron Maiden's European tour. Harris himself made the invitation, phoning Andrew Craighan to tell him that he thought The Angel and the Dark River was "a killer album".

The band's tour support from parent label Music for Nations' on the Iron Maiden and Dio tours cost around £100,000, which was then deduced from the band's royalties. Hammy wrote that "MDB had quite a few lean years as they repaid those investments". Craighan said that, despite being "financially fucked up", he had "no regrets" and he'd "do it again".

== Reception ==
In October 2011, The Angel and the Dark River was awarded IMPALA's gold record for sales of at least 75,000 copies throughout Europe.

In March 2023, Rolling Stone ranked the albums first track, "The Cry of Mankind", as the fifty-seventh greatest metal song of all time

== Track listing ==
No.	Title	Length
1.	"The Cry of Mankind"	12:13
2.	"From Darkest Skies"	7:48
3.	"Black Voyage"	9:46
4.	"A Sea to Suffer In"	6:31
5.	"Two Winters Only"	9:01
6.	"Your Shameful Heaven"	6:59
Total length:		52:18

=== Extended edition ===
No.	Title	Length
7.	"The Sexuality of Bereavement" (Bonus track)	8:04
Total length:		60:22

=== Live at the Dynamo ===
1. Your River – 8:13
2. A Sea to Suffer In – 6:21
3. Your Shameful Heaven – 6:21
4. The Forever People – 4:52

== Credits ==
- Aaron Stainthorpe - vocals, cover art, photos
- Andrew Craighan - guitar
- Calvin Robertshaw - guitar
- Adrian Jackson - bass
- Martin Powell - violin, keyboard
- Rick Miah - drums

== Charts ==
Chart (1995)	Peak position
German Albums (Offizielle Top 100)	61
