= Trinity (My Dying Bride album) =

Compilation album by My Dying Bride
- Released: 2 October 1995
- Genre: Death/doom
- Length: 63:57
- Label: Peaceville
- Producer: Hammy, Mags, My Dying Bride

My Dying Bride chronology
The Angel and the Dark River (1995)	Trinity (1995)	Like Gods of the Sun (1996)

American version cover

Trinity is the second compilation album by English doom metal band My Dying Bride. The album combines tracks from previously released EPs. This compilation CD also has two different versions of the front cover. The American release version has a different cover to the version released in the rest of the world. In 2004 the CD was re-released and given an extra 2 tracks taken from the band's first demo, "Towards the Sinister".

"Trinity" is the first of four My Dying Bride compilation albums, followed by 2000's "Meisterwerk 1" and "Meisterwerk 2" and 2005's "Anti-Diluvian Chronicles".

== Track listing ==
1. "Symphonaire Infernus Et Spera Empyrium" – 11:38
2. "God Is Alone" – 4:50
3. "De Sade Soliloquay" [sic] – 3:42
4. "The Thrash of Naked Limbs" – 6:11
5. "Le Cerf Malade" – 6:28
6. "Gather Me Up Forever" – 5:18
7. "I Am the Bloody Earth" – 6:36
8. "The Sexuality of Bereavement" – 8:04
9. "The Crown of Sympathy" (Remix) – 11:10
10. "Vast Choirs [limited edition bonus]" – 7:37
11. "Catching Feathers [limited edition bonus]" – 3:44

In the year 2004 Peaceville re-released this album correcting the title of the 3rd track to "De Sade Soliloquy".

== Credits ==
- Aaron Stainthorpe - vocals
- Andrew Craighan - guitar
- Calvin Robertshaw - guitar
- Adrian Jackson - bass
- Martin Powell - violin, keyboard
- Rick Miah - drums
- Guest vocals on "I Am The Bloody Earth" by Ghost of GGFH
