= Sinamorata =

Video by My Dying Bride
- Released: 13 September 2005
- Recorded: 2003
- Genre: Doom metal; death/doom
- Length: 143:11
- Label: Peaceville

My Dying Bride chronology
Anti-Diluvian Chronicles (2005)	Sinamorata (2005)	A Line of Deathless Kings (2006)

Sinamorata is the second video release by English doom metal band My Dying Bride, produced in 2005. The DVD contains two promotional video clips, another two clips created by My Dying Bride fans plus live video cuts and art galleries of live images, band images and fan-made artwork. Also, the DVD has live footage from a Hof Ter Lo performance in Antwerp, November 2003.

It was given a nine out of ten rating by Chronicles of Chaos.

== Track listing ==
Live 2003, Hof Ter Loo, Antwerpen

1. "The Dreadful Hours" – 7:47
2. "The Raven and the Rose" – 6:11
3. "Under Your Wings and into Your Arms" – 5:18
4. "The Prize of Beauty" – 6:20
5. "The Cry of Mankind" – 6:48
6. "A Kiss to Remember" – 7:32
7. "Catherine Blake" – 6:28
8. "She Is the Dark" – 8:14
9. "My Hope, the Destroyer" – 6:45
10. "The Wreckage of My Flesh" – 8:49
11. "Sear Me" – 10:10
12. "The Fever Sea" – 6:23

Video Clips

1. The Prize of Beauty – 4:34
2. The Blue Lotus – 7:25

Fan Videos

1. My Wine in Silence – 5:57
2. My Hope, the Destroyer – 4:48

Art Galleries

1. Band Images – 6:53
2. Fan-Made Artwork 1 – 1:59
3. Fan-Made Artwork 2 – 1:59
