= For Darkest Eyes =

For Darkest Eyes DVD

Video by My Dying Bride
- Released: 11 June 2002
- Recorded: 1993, 1996
- Genre: Death/doom metal
- Length: 3:31:44
- Label: Peaceville Records

My Dying Bride chronology
For Darkest Eyes (VHS) (1997)	For Darkest Eyes DVD (2002)	Sinamorata (2005)

For Darkest Eyes (VHS)

Video by My Dying Bride
- Released: 1997
- Recorded: 1996
- Genre: Death/doom metal
- Length: 1:40:22
- Label: Peaceville Records

My Dying Bride chronology
For Darkest Eyes (VHS) (1997)	For Darkest Eyes (DVD) (2002)

Professional ratings
Review scores
Source	Rating
Allmusic	3/5 stars

For Darkest Eyes is the first video release by English doom metal band My Dying Bride. Created first as a VHS in 1997, then later being reproduced as a DVD in 2002. Live footage from Willem II, The Netherlands on 3 November 1993, the picture gallery and the live song Sear Me done in Simplon 1992 do not appear on the video version due to time constraints of the old VHS format.

== Original VHS footage ==
Video Clips

1. "Symphonaire Infernus Et Spera Empyrium" – 5:31
2. "The Thrash of Naked Limbs – 4:41
3. "The Songless Bird – 4:49
4. "I Am the Bloody Earth"
5. "The Cry of Mankind" – 4:45
6. "For You" – 4:16

Live - Kraków, Poland 01/03/1996

1. "A Sea to Suffer In" – 6:11
2. "The Songless Bird" – 6:07
3. "The Crown of Sympathy" – 9:47
4. "The Thrash of Naked Limbs – 6:33
5. "The Cry of Mankind" – 6:53
6. "Your River" – 7:47
7. "Black Voyage" – 9:27
8. "Your Shameful Heaven" – 6:03
9. "From Darkest Skies" – 7:54
10. "The Forever People" – 5:00

== DVD release footage ==
Video Clips

1. "Symphonaire Infernus Et Spera Empyrium" – 5:31
2. "The Thrash of Naked Limbs" – 4:41
3. "The Songless Bird" – 4:49
4. "I Am the Bloody Earth"
5. "The Cry of Mankind" – 4:45
6. "For You" – 4:16

Live - Kraków, Poland 01/03/1996

1. "A Sea to Suffer In" – 6:11
2. "The Songless Bird" – 6:07
3. "The Crown of Sympathy" – 9:47
4. "The Thrash of Naked Limbs" – 6:33
5. "The Cry of Mankind – 6:53
6. "Your River" – 7:47
7. "Black Voyage – 9:27
8. "Your Shameful Heaven" – 6:03
9. "From Darkest Skies" – 7:54
10. "The Forever People" – 5:00

Live - Willem II, The Netherlands 07/11/1993

1. "The Songless Bird" – 7:20
2. "The Snow in My Hand" – 7:10
3. "The Crown of Sympathy" – 10:29
4. "The Thrash of Naked Limbs" – 6:56
5. "I Am the Bloody Earth" – 6:59
6. "Symphonaire Infernus Et Spera Empyrium" – 5:52
7. "Turn Loose the Swans" – 10:37
8. "Sear Me MCMXCIII" – 7:10
9. "Sear Me" [Live in Simplon 1992]

Live - Dynamo Festival 1995

1. "Your River" – 8:37
2. "A Sea to Suffer In" – 6:44
3. "The Songless Bird" – 7:04
4. "The Cry of Mankind" – 6:46

Gallery

1. The Band – 7:18
2. Artwork – 3:37
