= My Dying Bride =

English doom metal band

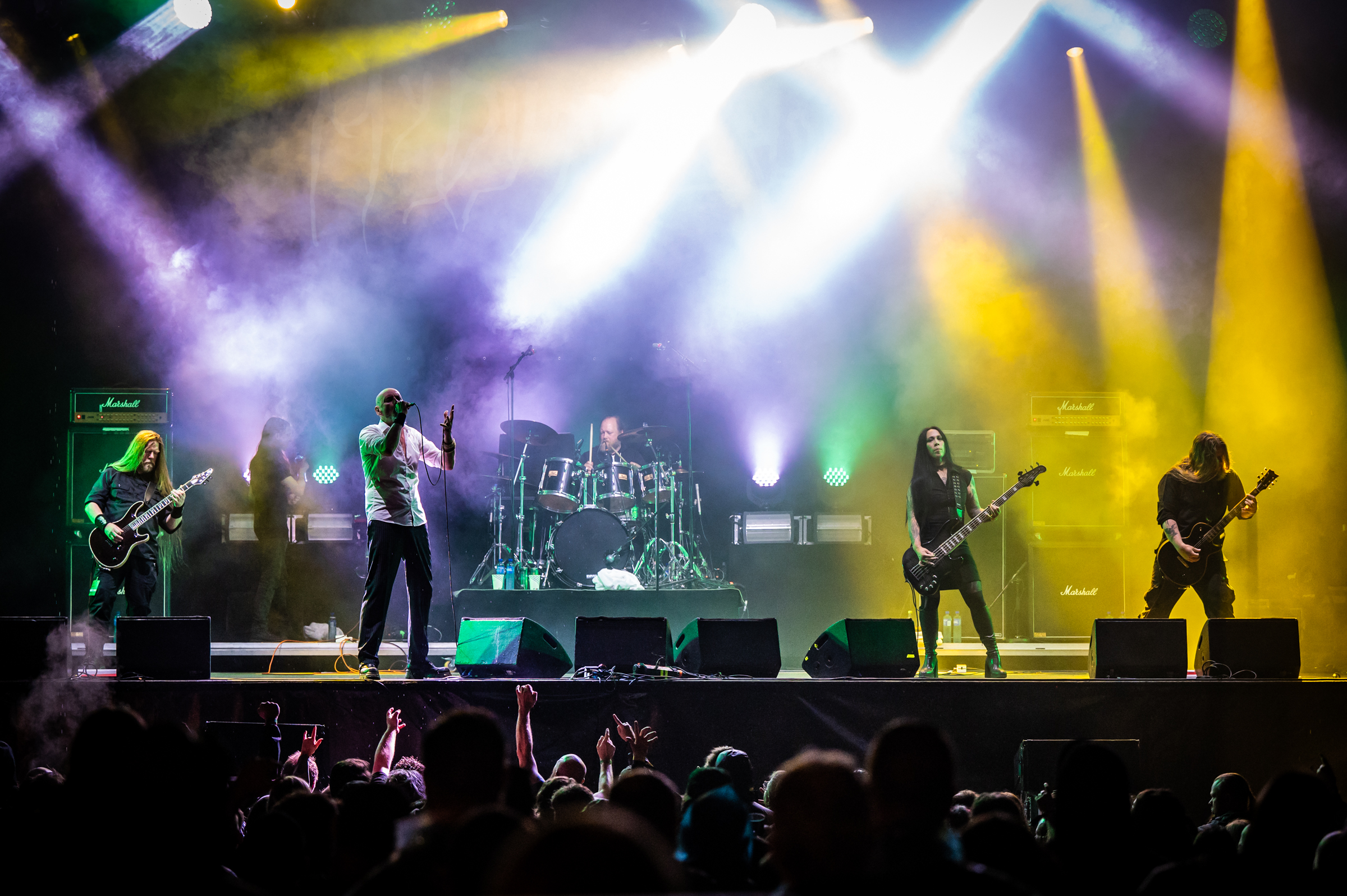
- My Dying Bride performing at Midgardsblot in 2023

Background information
- Origin: Bradford, West Yorkshire, England
- Genres: Doom metal; gothic metal; death-doom
- Years active: 1990–present
- Labels: Peaceville; Nuclear Blast
- Members: Andrew Craighan; Lena Abé; Shaun MacGowan; Neil Blanchett; Dan Mullins
- Past members: Aaron Stainthorpe; Martin Powell; Yasmin Ahmed; Bill Law; Rick Miah; Adrian Jackson; Sarah Stanton; Katie Stone; Hamish Glencross; Shaun Taylor-Steels; Calvin Robertshaw
- Website: Mydyingbride.net

My Dying Bride are an English doom metal band formed in Bradford. Since their inception in 1990, they have released 15 studio albums, five EPs, one demo, one box set, four compilation albums, one live album, and one live CD/DVD release.

Along with Anathema and Paradise Lost, My Dying Bride were a forerunner of the death doom metal and gothic metal genres during the early 1990s. These bands comprise "The Peaceville Three" as all were signed to Peaceville Records at the time.

== History ==
=== Early years (1990–1992) ===
My Dying Bride was formed in Bradford, West Yorkshire, England, in June 1990, by guitarist Andrew Craighan, drummer Rick Miah, vocalist Aaron Stainthorpe, and guitarist Calvin Robertshaw. Craighan and Miah were previously members of the band Abiosis. After six months of rehearsing, the band recorded and released their demo, Towards the Sinister, which was produced by Tim Walker of Voltage Records. Its title was taken from a line in the song "Symphonaire Infernus et Spera Empyrium". The band then released their first single, "God Is Alone", on a small French label called Listenable. After the single had sold out almost immediately, they were picked up by Peaceville Records, and they could release their first EP, Symphonaire Infernus et Spera Empyrium, which also featured their latest recruit, bassist Adrian Jackson. The EP was soon followed by their first album, As the Flower Withers.

=== Turn Loose the Swans (1992–1994) ===
As the Flower Withers was followed by a large tour in the UK and the mainland Europe, and in 1992 they recorded their next EP, The Thrash of Naked Limbs. Another tour was planned, but cancelled when their current drummer had a bad fall while shooting the accompanying video. In 1993, Martin Powell joined as My Dying Bride's keyboardist and violinist, and they started the recording of their second studio album, Turn Loose the Swans. With the joining of Martin Powell, the usage of violin increased even more since their As the Flower Withers album. The album was released that year followed by a tour and another EP, I Am the Bloody Earth.

=== The Angel and the Dark River (1995) ===
1995 saw the release of My Dying Bride's next album, The Angel and the Dark River. The album was followed with a successful tour with some of their first festival gigs, and soon after the fans saw the release of their first compilation album, Trinity, a collection of songs from their first three EPs. At the end of 1995, My Dying Bride traveled on a three-month tour with Iron Maiden.

=== Like Gods of the Sun (1996–1997) ===
Like Gods of the Sun continued in the direction of The Angel and the Dark River, in that it did not contain any growling vocals by Aaron Stainthorpe. This was the fourth album of My Dying Bride, featuring songs like "A Kiss to Remember", "For You" and "For My Fallen Angel". "For My Fallen Angel" is strictly an orchestral composition with sections of violin and synth. It is also the last MDB album to feature a violin, until For Lies I Sire.

=== 34.788%...Complete and hiatus (1998–2001) ===
The somewhat experimental 34.788%...Complete was next, followed by The Light at the End of the World. My Dying Bride entered a hiatus after this, releasing two retrospective albums Meisterwerk 1 and Meisterwerk 2. The Meisterwerk albums are compilations that contain previously released and rare material from My Dying Bride. At the end of the hiatus, Calvin Robertshaw left the band to become their tour manager and was replaced by Hamish Glencross.

=== The Dreadful Hours (2001–2004) ===
Originally released in 2001, The Dreadful Hours featured new material with the seventh release. The album was again engineered by Mags and co-produced by guitarist Andrew Craighan. Between 2003 and 2004, the band's label, Peaceville, re-released their entire back-catalogue in digipak format, with bonus tracks consisting of demos, remixes, and live performances added to each release (except "The Light at the End of the World").

=== Songs of Darkness, Words of Light (2004–2005) ===
2004's follow-up was Songs of Darkness, Words of Light.

The band's next release came in May 2005, when they released the fancifully titled Anti-Diluvian Chronicles, a fully-fledged best of box set featuring three discs and thirty tracks.

=== A Line of Deathless Kings (2006–2007) ===
The band spent the winter of 2005/2006 writing material for new studio album A Line of Deathless Kings. The album was released on 9 October 2006. It was preceded by the EP Deeper Down on 18 September. Shortly before the release of A Line of Deathless Kings, Shaun Taylor-Steels announced his permanent departure from the band due to persistent problems with his ankle.

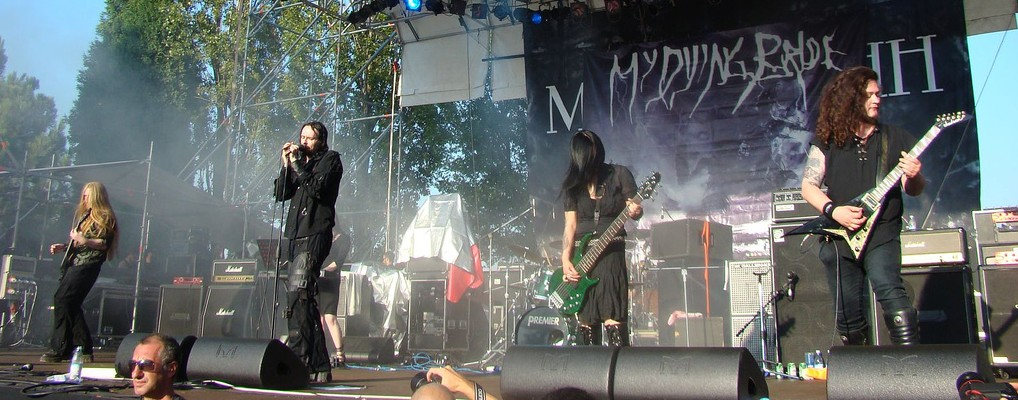
My Dying Bride opening for Meshuggah

In early 2007, Jackson announced his departure and session-drummer John Bennett from The Prophecy could no longer stay, citing a lack of time due to work commitments. Replacements were found in Lena Abé on bass and Dan Mullins on drums.

=== For Lies I Sire, Evinta, The Barghest O' Whitby (2009–2011) ===
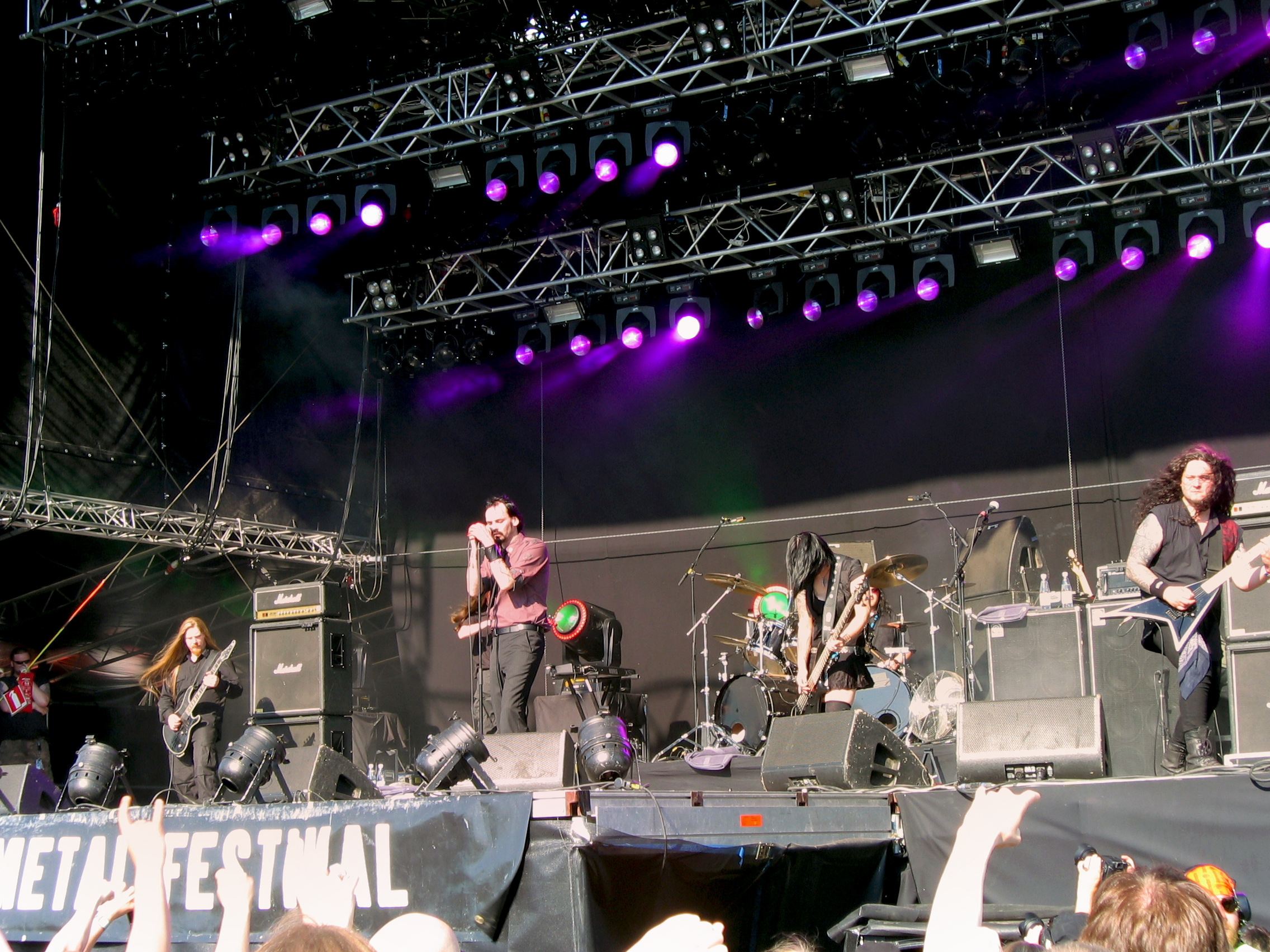
My Dying Bride playing at Tuska 2009

In November 2008, My Dying Bride began work on their tenth studio album, entitled For Lies I Sire, which was released on 23 March 2009. Due to Sarah Stanton's pregnancy, she had been replaced on keyboards by Katie Stone, who also performed violin on For Lies I Sire. Soon after the album's release, Stone was replaced by Shaun MacGowan.

On 26 October 2009, My Dying Bride released an EP/DVD titled Bring Me Victory. Except for the title track and its video, it also includes a doom metal cover of the traditional song Scarborough Fair, a cover of "Failure" by Swans and a live version of "Vast Choirs" (originally from As the Flower Withers), performed at Graspop 2008.

To commemorate the 20th anniversary of My Dying Bride's existence, the album Evinta was released on 30 May 2011. Evinta featured some previous My Dying Bride material re-worked as neo-classical and ambient songs. Afterward, the band announced the release of The Barghest o' Whitby, an EP consisting of a single 27-minute track which was released 7 November 2011.

=== A Map of All Our Failures and The Manuscript (2012–2014) ===
A Map of All Our Failures was released on 15 October 2012.

On 13 May 2013, the band released a four-track EP, The Manuscript. Three of the four tracks from the EP were recorded at the same time as A Map of All Our Failures. A year later on 26 May 2014 the songs of this EP were re-released together with The Barghest O' Whitby as The Vaulted Shadows compilation.

Guitarist Hamish Glencross had been fired upon returning from their U.S. 2014 Maryland Deathfest appearance, and original guitarist Calvin Robertshaw returned to the band.

=== Feel the Misery and move to Nuclear Blast (2015–2019) ===
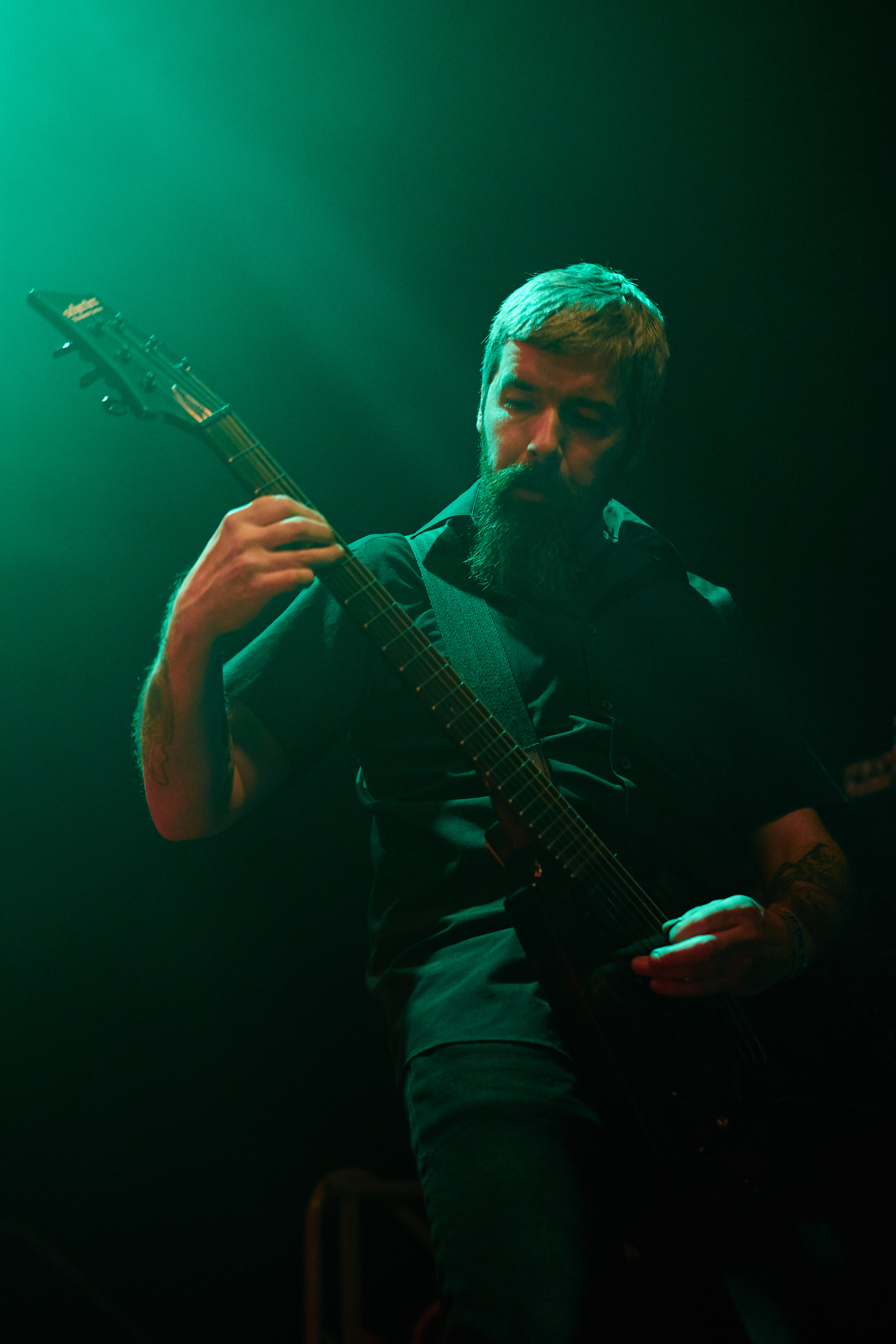
Calvin Robertshaw, 2015

On 18 September 2015, Feel the Misery was released, with eight tracks. In March 2017, the band signed with Nuclear Blast Records. The same year, drummer Dan Mullins left the band, and was replaced with Shaun Steels, who had been in the band from 1999 to 2006, and had played on A Map of All Our Failures in 2012 as a session member.

In 2017, after cancelling four festival appearances, Aaron Stainthorpe explained that the band was working on a new album, and had therefore not disbanded. In fact, My Dying Bride signed a new contract with Nuclear Blast. In a My Dying Bride Facebook post on 18 September 2018, Aaron Stainthorpe explained that the band cancelled those shows due to the cancer of his 5-year-old daughter, who is presently in remission.

On 4 December 2018, the band announced that Shaun Steels had been replaced by Jeff Singer due to "unresolvable drumming issues" and that the drum tracks for the new album had been completed by Singer.

On 24 May 2019, the band released A Harvest of Dread, a deluxe 12-inch 92-page hardback book five-disc set of rarities, early works, previously unheard pre-production demos, band favorites, and live audio. Also in 2019, Calvin Robertshaw had left My Dying Bride for a second time, and was replaced by Neil Blanchett on guitars.

=== The Ghost of Orion (2020–2023) ===
My Dying Bride's 13th album, The Ghost of Orion, was released on 6 March 2020. It was released five years after their previous effort, Feel the Misery, which is the band's longest gap between studio albums to date.

Beforehand, the album's first single, "Your Broken Shore", was released on 20 January, followed by a second single, "Tired of Tears", on 7 February.

Later in 2020, the band released their 7th EP, Macabre Cabaret.

=== A Mortal Binding and departure of Stainthorpe (2024–present) ===
My Dying Bride announced in February their 14th studio album, A Mortal Binding, which was released on 19 April 2024. Preceding the release were singles "Thornwyck Hymn" in February and "The 2nd of Three Bells" in March.

However, just two weeks before the album launch, the band canceled all live shows, citing internal tensions among members. In an interview with Devolution magazine, vocalist Aaron Stainthorpe revealed that he and guitarist Andrew Craighan had been managing the band without a formal manager for years, which had led to creative disagreements and stress. Stainthorpe emphasised the need for a break to avoid a "massive bust-up", acknowledging that while it was not an ideal time to pause given their album release and scheduled gigs the decision was necessary for the band's well-being.

On 6 December 2024, the band announced that they will continue performing live shows in 2025, but due to Stainthorpe having been absent from the band since their short break, they will tour with Swallow the Sun vocalist Mikko Kotamäki. This absence was confirmed as permanent on October 9, 2025, when My Dying Bride stated on social media that they and Stainthorpe were officially separating.

== Band members ==
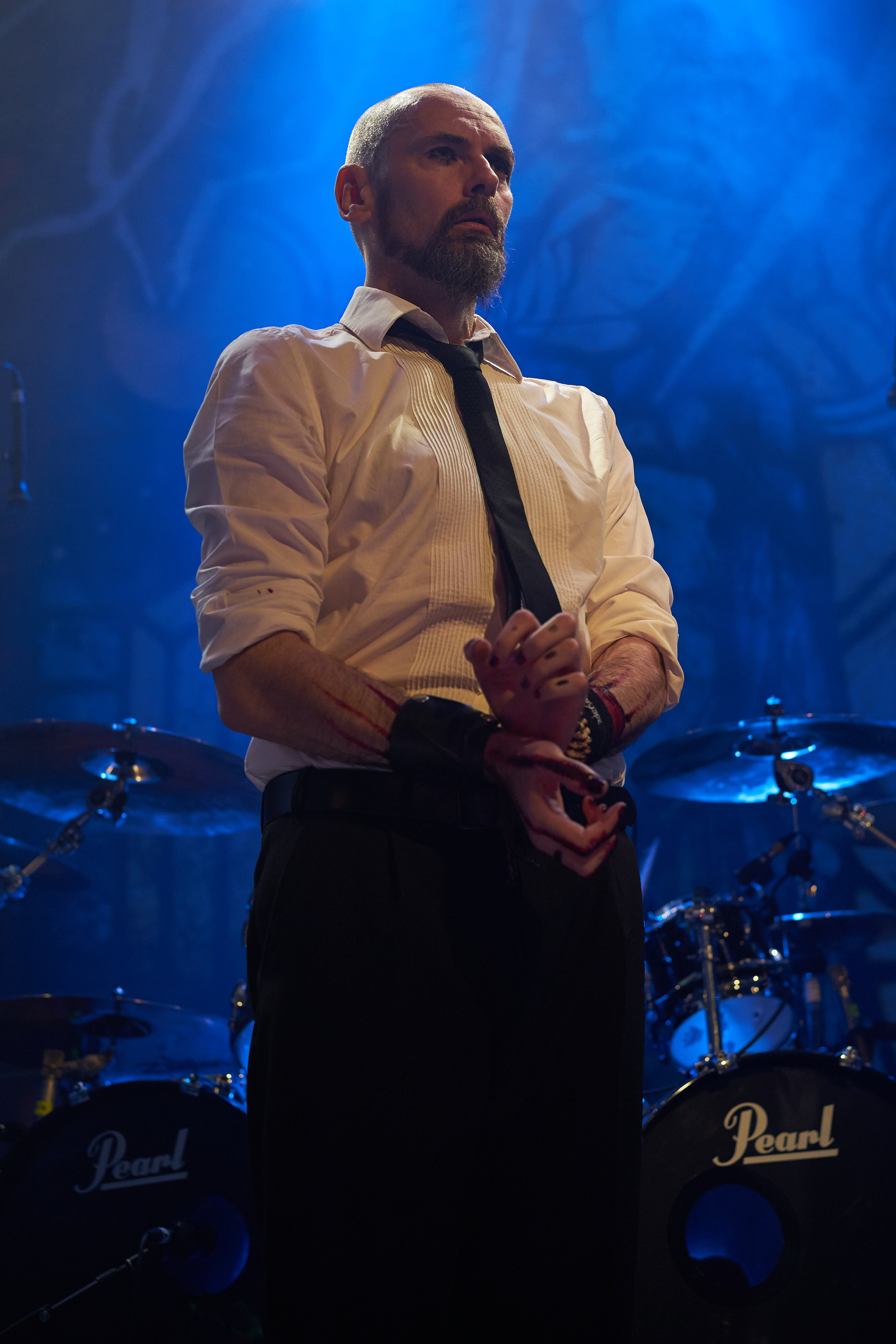
Former vocalist Stainthorpe in 2015

=== Current members ===
- Andrew Craighan – lead guitar (1990–present), bass (1990–1991; in studio only)
- Lena Abé – bass (2007–present)
- Dan Mullins – drums (2007–2017, 2022–present)
- Shaun MacGowan – keyboards, violin (2009–present)
- Neil Blanchett – rhythm guitar (2019–present)

=== Current live members ===
- Mikko Kotamäki – vocals (2024–present)

=== Former members ===
- Aaron Stainthorpe – vocals (1990–2025)
- Calvin Robertshaw – rhythm guitar (1990–1999, 2014–2018)
- Rick Miah – drums (1990–1997)
- Adrian Jackson – bass (1991–2007)
- Martin Powell – keyboards, violin (1993–1998; session musician 1991–1993)
- Bill Law – drums (1998–1999)
- Yasmin Ahmed – keyboards (1998–2002)
- Shaun Taylor-Steels – drums (1999–2006, 2017–2018; session musician 2011–2013)
- Hamish Glencross – rhythm guitar (2000–2014)
- Sarah Stanton – keyboards (2002–2008)
- Katie Stone – keyboards, violin (2008–2009)
- Jeff Singer – drums (2018–2022)

=== Former live members ===
- John Bennett – drums (2006–2007)
- David Gray – drums (2010–2013)
- Robb Philpotts – rhythm guitar (2014)

== Discography ==
- As the Flower Withers (1992)
- Turn Loose the Swans (1993)
- The Angel and the Dark River (1995)
- Like Gods of the Sun (1996)
- 34.788%...Complete (1998)
- The Light at the End of the World (1999)
- The Dreadful Hours (2001)
- Songs of Darkness, Words of Light (2004)
- A Line of Deathless Kings (2006)
- For Lies I Sire (2009)
- Evinta (2011) – also categorised as a remix album
- A Map of All Our Failures (2012)
- Feel the Misery (2015)
- The Ghost of Orion (2020)
- A Mortal Binding (2024)
