= Shaun Steels =

- Born: Shaun Taylor-Steels; 22 August 1970 (age 55); Normanton, West Yorkshire, England
- Genres: Doom metal, black metal
- Instruments: Drums, bass guitar

Shaun 'Winter' Taylor-Steels (born Shaun Steels, 22 August 1970) is a British heavy metal drummer and bassist. Steels, born in Normanton, West Yorkshire, is of Scottish and Norwegian descent on his mother's side of the family.

Steels replaced Bill Law in My Dying Bride, and once was a member of Anathema. Like many other metal musicians, he has a pseudonym and adopted the stage name 'Winter'.

Shortly before the release of the 2006 album A Line of Deathless Kings, Steels announced his permanent departure from My Dying Bride due to health concerns.

In the band's official statement concerning his departure, Steels is quoted as saying, "I would just like to salute MDB for the good times and wish them all well in the future, I feel I am not ready to fulfill the duties in a manner befitting MDB at this time and have decided to stand down. I am sad to be leaving but at this time I feel it is for the greater good of the band".

Steels also recorded drums with the Norwegian metal band Vestige of Virtue alongside Kjetil Ottersen and Frode Forsmo.

Steels returned to My Dying Bride as a studio drummer for their 2012 album A Map of All Our Failures. In May 2013, Steels also replaced Hayley Morgan in Yorkshire black metal band Severed Heaven. After two years with the band he left and joined Darkher.

He recorded 'realms' and played live with the band from 2015 to 2017. In 2016, Steels recorded a live session with Darkher at the Maida Vale recording studios in London for BBC Radio 1.

In 2017 he rejoined My Dying Bride as a full-time member. but then departed from the band again in 2018. In December 2018, it was wrongly publicised that Steels had been sacked from the band. He had in fact left months before it was made public due to being extremely unhappy with the situation he found himself in.. Steels also plays drums alongside longtime friend and fellow musician Hamish Glencross in the blackened doom metal band Godthrymm.

Steels is endorsed by Czarcie Kopyto custom made drum pedals.
