= Martin Powell =

British musician

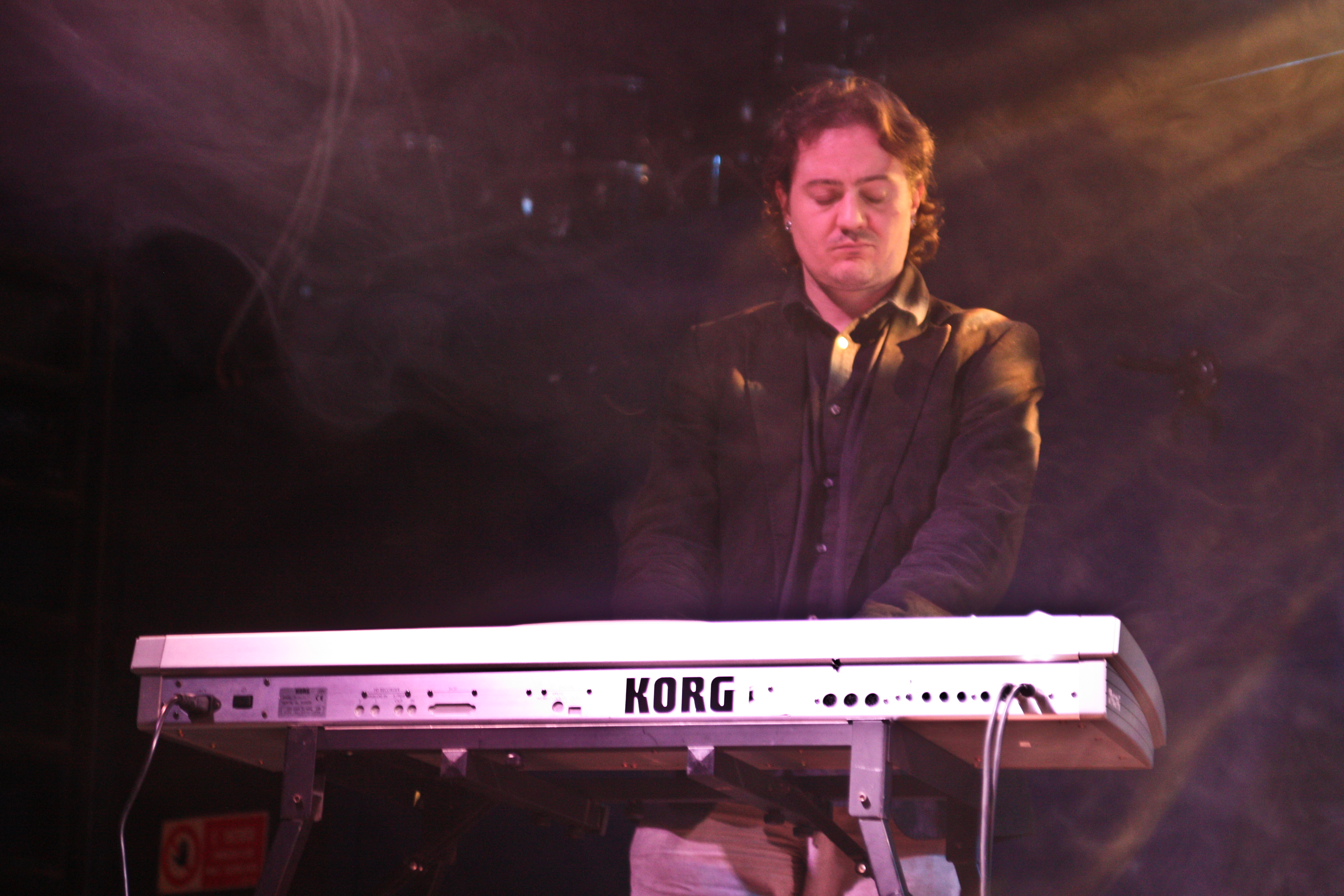
- Powell performing in 2011

Background information
- Born: Martin Powell
- Origin: Sheffield, West Riding of Yorkshire, England
- Genres: Doom metal; extreme metal
- Occupation: Musician
- Instruments: Violin; keyboard; guitar

Martin Powell is an English musician. In 1991, Powell auditioned for the position of bass player in the band My Dying Bride but was turned down as the band had just filled the position. Upon informing the band he was also a violin and keyboard player, he was hired as a session musician, before becoming the band's permanent violinist and keyboardist.

Around 1998, Powell and My Dying Bride parted ways, and he joined Anathema, in the role of live keyboardist, only to depart two years later. In 2000, Powell joined the British extreme metal band Cradle of Filth along with drummer Adrian Erlandsson and guitarist Paul Allender after the departure of Les 'Lecter' Smith. The band then went to record the album Midian. The following year, the band released their transitional mini-album Bitter Suites to Succubi. In 2003 they released the album Damnation and a Day using a small orchestra and choral section for which Powell wrote the score. Powell wrote several songs for both that album and was also a songwriter for the band's 2004 album Nymphetamine on which he also played guitars on several tracks as well as keyboard duties. He was nominated for a Grammy Award for Best Metal Performance with Cradle of Filth in 2005. In that same year, Powell and CoF parted ways.

After his departure from Cradle of Filth, Powell returned to university where he earned a first class degree in music (and won The Phillip John Lord Composition Prize) and completed a PhD in music composition in 2013.

Powell is featured on the Type O Negative DVD Symphony for the Devil. He played live keyboards for Tiamat in 2006 to 2007.

He toured with Alternative 4 as live keyboard player in 2011 and 2012. He wrote and played keyboards for the 2013 album "When the Circle of Light Begins to Fade" from Australian band The Eternal. He also toured as live keyboard player for Solstafir in 2016. In 2016, he wrote and played keyboards on Lawnmower Deth's first single after 22 years "I am Cob" which received airplay on BBC Radio 2 courtesy of Simon Mayo. Most recently, he played and composed keyboards for the Dutch band Bleeding Gods' album, "Dodekathlon" released February in 2018. Powell also wrote and played on the album "Waiting for the Endless Dawn" by The Eternal, released in 2018.
