= Hamish Glencross =

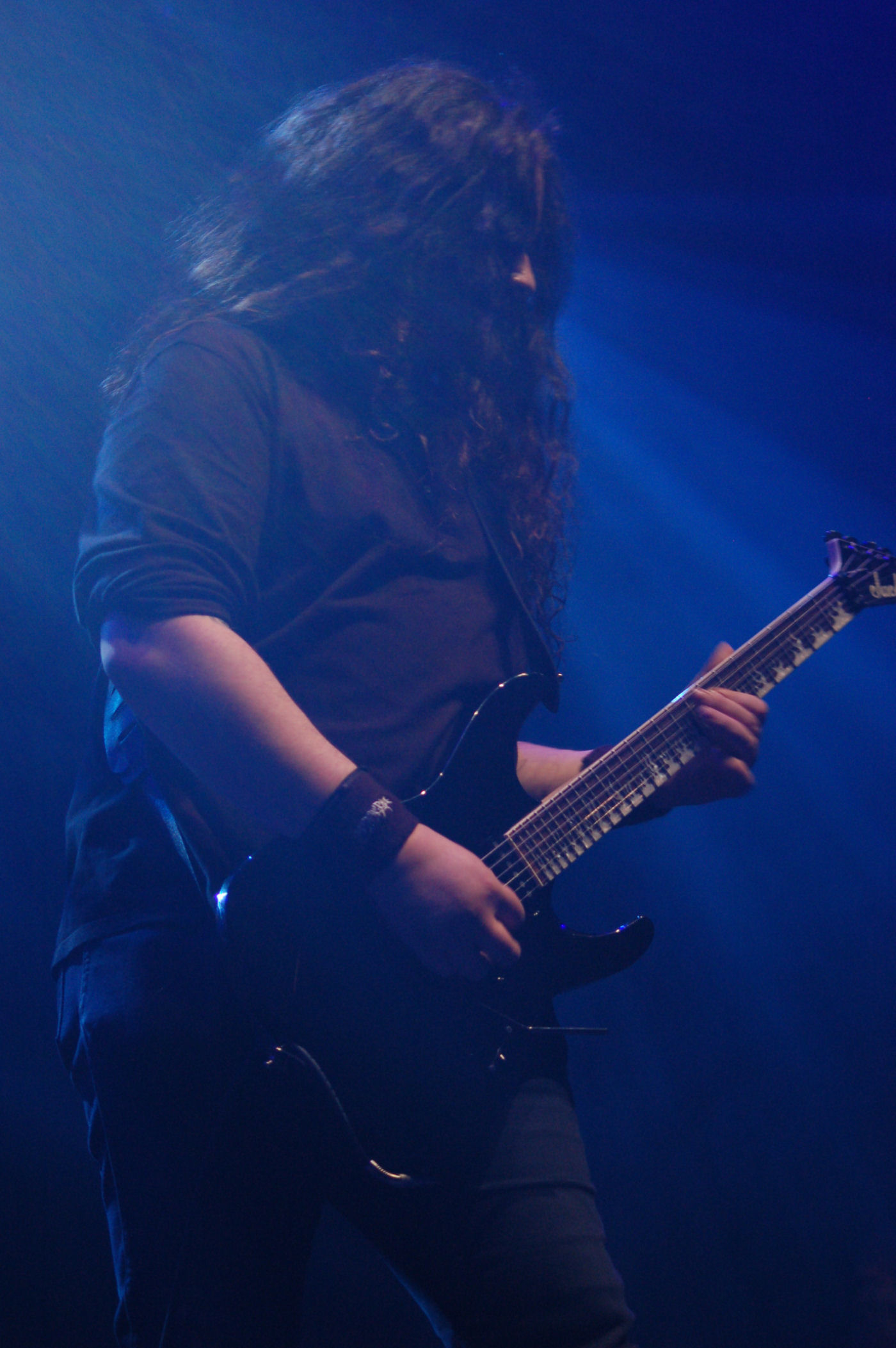

Background information
- Genres: Doom metal, gothic metal
- Occupation: Musician
- Instrument: Electric guitar

Hamish Glencross is a Scottish guitarist best known for his work with the English metal band My Dying Bride. He also co-founded the short-lived Blackdoom Records with the band's other guitarist, Andrew Craighan.

Glencross had a brief acting career before concentrating on music, most notably in the UK children's drama Children's Ward.

Prior to joining My Dying Bride, Glencross played guitar for Bradford alternative rock band Driftwood, UK progressive metal band Seer's Tear, and Leeds-based punk/metal band Apocalypso. He was a member of UK doom metal band Solstice playing on their album New Dark Age. In 1999 he replaced My Dying Bride guitarist Calvin Robertshaw prior to the band touring for the album The Light at the End of the World. As of 2011, he also plays lead guitar in the UK death metal band Vallenfyre, appearing on the albums A Fragile King, Splinters and Fear Those Who Fear Him all released on Century Media Records.

On 6 June 2014, My Dying Bride announced via their web site that Glencross had left the band due to "irreconcilable differences," and that former guitarist Calvin Robertshaw would be returning.

Glencross is currently vocalist and guitarist in epic doom band Godthrymm which also features members and ex-members of My Dying Bride, Anathema, and Solstice.

Glencross currently endorses Jackson guitars, and has been playing them exclusively since 2006. He favours the Jackson Randy Rhoads model, playing a number of variations of that model both live and in the studio.

== Equipment ==
- Jackson Guitars
- Line 6 Processors
- Blackstar Amplification amplifiers and speaker cabinets
