= Aaron Stainthorpe =

British singer

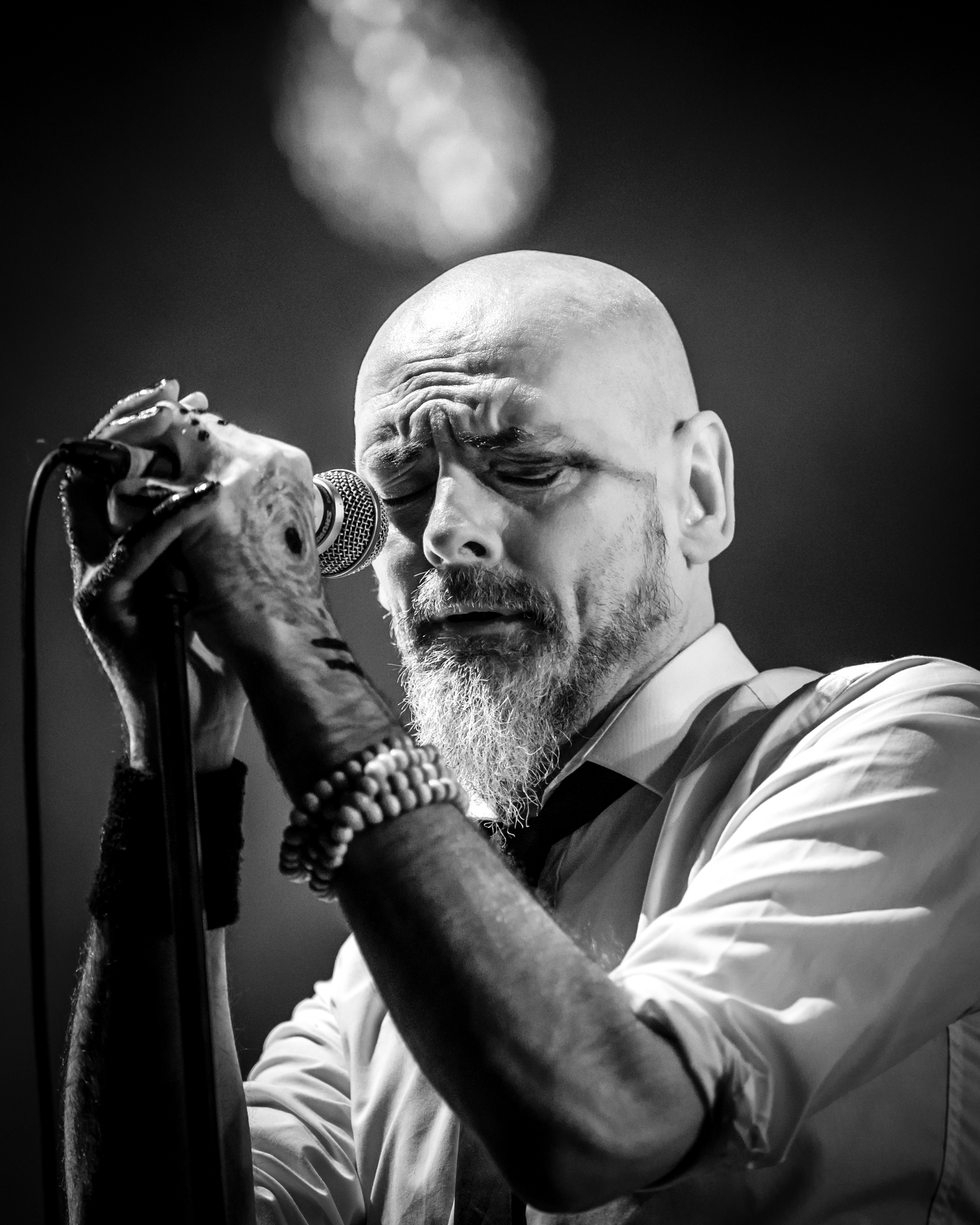
- Stainthorpe during a My Dying Bride performance in 2023

Background information
- Born: 12 November 1968 (age 57); England
- Genres: Doom metal, death-doom, gothic metal
- Occupation: Singer
- Years active: 1990–present
- Label: Peaceville Records
- Website: azzron.com

Aaron Stainthorpe (born 12 November 1968) is an English singer who is the lead vocalist for the gothic metal band High Parasite. He is best known as the former lead vocalist for doom metal band My Dying Bride, which he helped found in 1990 and fronted until his departure in October 2025.

In December 2005, it was announced that Stainthorpe would lend his voice and some lyrics to a song with Sarah Jezebel Deva's new band Angtoria. "Original Sin", taken from the band's first album God Has a Plan for Us All, was released in April 2006.

Stainthorpe has made other guest appearances on Dominion's Interface and Disincarnate's Dreams of the Carrion Kind. He also made a narration appearance on Dreambreed's Sometime mini-album in 1995. In 2021 he was a guest vocalist on the debut album of the Romanian doom metal band Olympus Mons.

He also appears on Marianas Rest's Album "Auer" as guest vocalist in the last track "Sirens".

== Personal life ==
Stainthorpe was born in England but moved to Germany when he was six months old, because his British army officer father was stationed in the country. He lives in Halifax, West Yorkshire. He has a baritone vocal range. He is an avid reader of Romantic poets such as Percy Bysshe Shelley.

Despite the morose nature of his lyrics, Stainthorpe insists they do not give a full overview of his personality. In 2004, he said:

"Some of the stuff is influenced by personal mishaps in life. Nobody has lived a perfectly good life without tragedies and we've used them as part of our songwriting. I think that dwelling on the darker side of life seems much more interesting and evocative than the happier things...I've got somewhere to put my depression and it's called My Dying Bride...I'm generally a happy guy!"
