= Andrew Craighan =

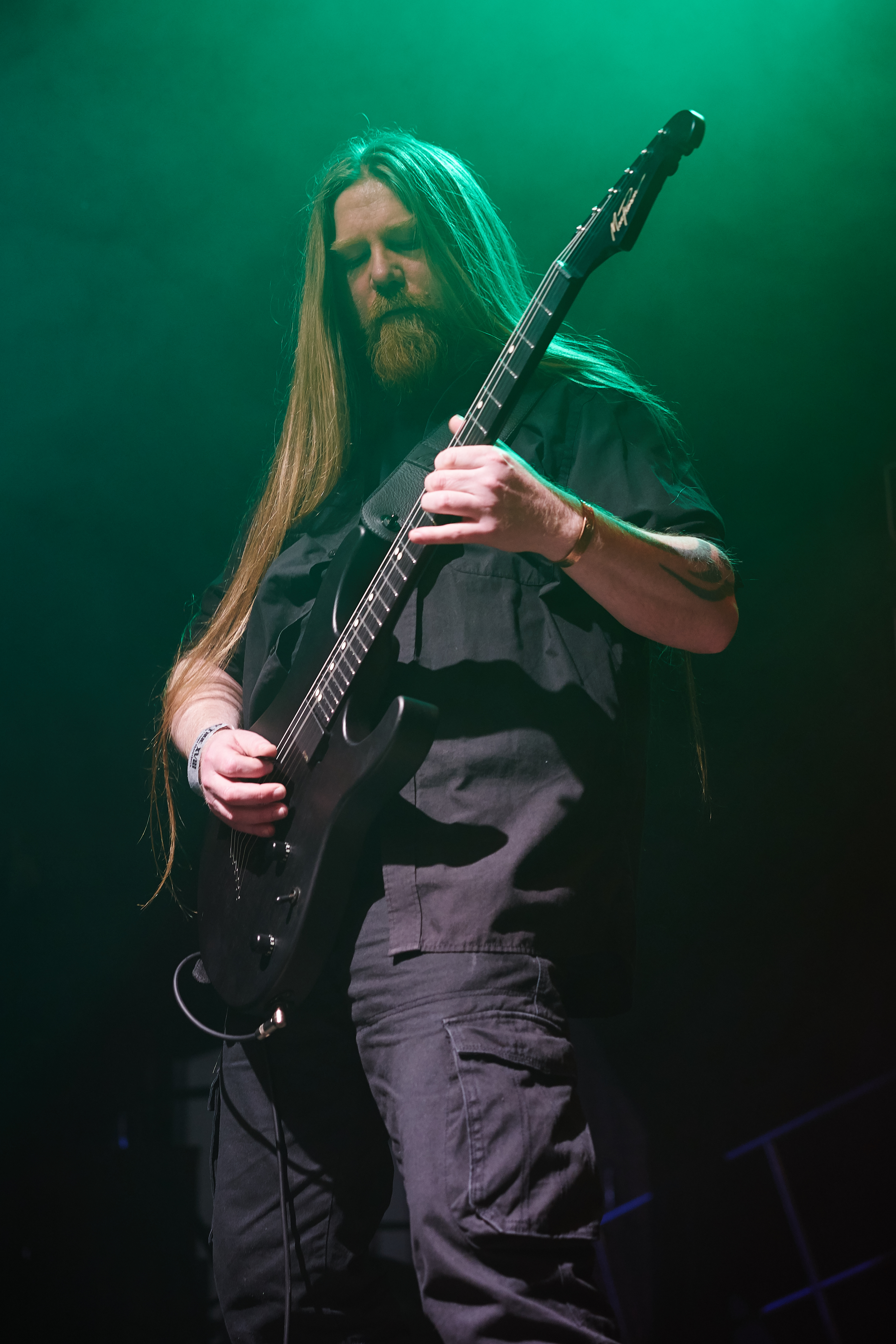

Background information
- Born: 18 July 1970 (age 55)
- Genres: Doom metal, death-doom, gothic metal
- Occupation: Musician
- Instrument: Electric guitar

Andrew Craighan (born 18 July 1970) is one of My Dying Bride's founding guitarists. Craighan is the only original My Dying Bride member still in the lineup. He played the guitar from 1989 to 1990 in the band Abiosis.

== Equipment ==
Craighan uses EMG pickups, including the EMG 81TW and EMG 85 models. He also uses Macpherson guitars, Sperzel tuners, and Elixir Strings.
