= 1997 in heavy metal music =

This is a timeline documenting the events of heavy metal in the year 1997.

== Newly formed bands ==
- 1349
- Akercocke
- Aletheian
- The Amenta
- American Head Charge
- Amoral
- Armageddon
- Atargatis
- Blackstar
- Blood Has Been Shed
- Born from Pain
- Brougham
- Caliban
- Carnal Forge
- Dagoba
- Dark Lunacy
- Dark Suns
- Deadlock
- Diecast
- The Dillinger Escape Plan
- Dir En Grey
- Dolorian
- Doomsword
- Dope
- Droid
- Elvenking
- Explorers Club
- Factory 81
- Finntroll
- Five Foot Thick
- Forefather
- Goatwhore
- Gorod
- Halestorm
- Halfcocked
- Hardcore Superstar
- Hate Eternal
- Insomnium
- Isis
- Karma to Burn
- Karnivool
- Keelhaul
- Liquid Tension Experiment
- Lostprophets
- Nebula
- Nonpoint
- Norma Jean
- Obscurity
- Onesidezero
- Origin
- Paysage d'Hiver
- Persuader
- Pig Destroyer
- Pleymo
- Poison the Well
- Primal Fear
- Primer 55
- Pulse Ultra (As Headspace)
- Rapture
- Reveille
- Secret Sphere
- Serial Joe
- Severe Torture
- Shuvel
- Sick Puppies
- Sinergy
- Skrape (As JoJo)
- Soil
- Soulfly
- Sunk Loto (As Messiah)
- Spawn of Possession
- Taproot
- Three Days Grace
- Throwdown
- Thurisaz
- Tierra Santa
- Trust Company (As 41 Down)
- Turisas
- Underoath
- U.P.O.
- Vesania
- Vintersorg
- Witchery

== Reformed bands ==
- The original Black Sabbath lineup
- Jane's Addiction (disbanded again later that year)
- Ratt
- Suicidal Tendencies

== Albums ==
- 20 Dead Flower Children – Candy Toy Guns and Television
- 41 Down – 41 Down (early version of Trust Company under their original name)
- Acid King – Down with the Crown (EP)
- Aerosmith – Nine Lives
- Acumen Nation – More Human Heart
- Alice Cooper – A Fistful of Alice (live)
- Anvil – Absolutely No Alternative
- Anal Cunt – I Like It When You Die
- Arcturus – La Masquerade Infernale
- Assück – Misery Index
- Belphegor – Blutsabbath
- Blackstar – Barbed Wire Soul
- Blood of Christ – ...A Dream to Remember
- Body Count – Violent Demise: The Last Days
- Borknagar – The Olden Domain
- Bruce Dickinson – Accident of Birth
- Brutal Truth – Sounds of the Animal Kingdom
- Burzum – Dauði Baldrs
- Children of Bodom – Something Wild (Finland release)
- Cinderella – Once Upon A...
- Clawfinger – Clawfinger
- Coal Chamber – Coal Chamber
- Conception – Flow
- Creed – My Own Prison
- The Crown – Eternal Death
- D.A.D. – Simpatico
- Damaged – Token Remedies Research
- Dark Tranquillity – The Mind's I
- Deceased – Fearless Undead Machines
- Deftones – Around the Fur
- Deicide – Serpents of the Light
- Deströyer 666 – Unchain the Wolves
- Devin Townsend – Ocean Machine: Biomech
- The Dillinger Escape Plan – The Dillinger Escape Plan (EP)
- Dimmu Borgir – Enthrone Darkness Triumphant
- Dismember – Death Metal
- Dog Fashion Disco – Erotic Massage
- Dokken – Shadowlife
- Dream Theater – Falling into Infinity
- Ebony Tears – Tortura Insomniae
- Edguy – Kingdom of Madness
- Edge of Sanity – Infernal
- Edge of Sanity – Cryptic
- Electric Wizard – Come My Fanatics...
- Emperor – Anthems to the Welkin at Dusk
- Enslaved – Eld
- Entombed – DCLXVI: To Ride, Shoot Straight and Speak the Truth
- Europe – Definitive Collection (compilation)
- Factory 81 – Crawl Space (EP)
- Faith No More – Album of the Year
- Far – Soon (EP)
- Fatal Opera - The Eleventh Hour
- Fates Warning – A Pleasant Shade of Gray
- Flapjack – Juicy Planet Earth
- Freak Kitchen – Junk Tooth (EP)
- Gamma Ray – Somewhere Out in Space
- The Gathering – Nighttime Birds
- Geezer – Black Science
- Gilby Clarke – The Hangover (Gilby Clarke album)
- Glassjaw – Kiss Kiss Bang Bang (EP)
- Godflesh – Love and Hate in Dub (remix)
- Godsmack – All Wound Up...
- Gorgoroth – Under the Sign of Hell
- Graveworm – When Daylight's Gone
- Grip Inc. – Nemesis
- Grinspoon – Guide to Better Living
- Grinspoon – Repeat (EP)
- Guano Apes – Proud Like a God
- Gwar – Carnival of Chaos
- HammerFall – Glory to the Brave
- Handsome – Handsome
- Hatebreed – Satisfaction Is the Death of Desire
- Hed PE – (həd)^{pe}
- Helmet – Aftertaste
- HIM – Greatest Lovesongs Vol. 666
- Hoobastank – Muffins (EP)
- Human Waste Project – E-lux
- Hypocrisy – The Final Chapter
- Iced Earth – Days of Purgatory (remix)
- Illdisposed – There's Something Rotten... In the State of Denmark
- Immortal – Blizzard Beasts
- In Flames – Whoracle
- Incantation – The Forsaken Mourning of Angelic Anguish (EP)
- Incantation – Tribute to the Goat (live)
- Incubus – Enjoy Incubus (EP)
- Incubus – S.C.I.E.N.C.E.
- Integrity – Seasons in the Size of Days
- Iron Savior – Iron Savior
- Jag Panzer – The Fourth Judgement
- Jane's Addiction – Kettle Whistle (compilation)
- Jimmie's Chicken Shack – Pushing the Salmanilla Envelope
- Judas Priest – Jugulator
- Judas Priest – The Best of Judas Priest: Living After Midnight
- Kamelot – Dominion
- Keep of Kalessin – Through Times of War
- Kiss – Carnival of Souls: The Final Sessions
- Konkhra – Weed Out the Weak
- Krabathor – Mortal Memories (EP)
- Kreator – Outcast
- Lacrimosa – Stille
- L7 – The Beauty Process: Triple Platinum
- Lostprophets – Here Cumz Tha Party (EP)
- Life of Agony – Soul Searching Sun
- Limp Bizkit – Three Dollar Bill, Y'all$
- Yngwie Malmsteen – Facing the Animal
- Machine Head – The More Things Change...
- Malevolent Creation – In Cold Blood
- Marilyn Manson – Remix & Repent (EP)
- Megadeth – Cryptic Writings
- Memento Mori - Songs for the Apocalypse, Vol. IV
- Metallica – ReLoad
- Molotov – ¿Dónde Jugarán las Niñas?
- Morgion – Among Majestic Ruin
- Mötley Crüe – Generation Swine
- Mudvayne – Kill, I Oughtta (EP)
- Napalm Death – Inside the Torn Apart
- Necrophobic – Darkside
- Nembrionic – Bloodcult (EP)
- Neuraxis - Imagery
- Night in Gales – Towards the Twilight
- Nightwish – Angels Fall First
- Nothingface – Pacifier
- No-Big-Silence – 99
- No One Is Innocent – Utopia
- Novembers Doom – For Every Leaf That Falls (EP)
- Obituary – Back from the Dead
- Old Man's Child – The Pagan Prosperity
- On Thorns I Lay – Orama
- Orange Goblin – Frequencies from Planet Ten
- Overkill – From the Underground and Below
- Ozzy Osbourne – The Ozzman Cometh
- Pain - Pain
- Pain of Salvation – Entropia
- Pantera – Official Live: 101 Proof (live)
- Pariah – Unity
- Pessimist – Cult of the Initiated
- Papa Roach – Old Friends from Young Years
- Pig Destroyer – Demo (EP)
- Pig Destroyer – Pig Destroyer / Orchid (split EP)
- Powerman 5000 – Mega!! Kung Fu Radio
- Primus – Brown Album
- Queensrÿche – Hear in the Now Frontier
- Rammstein – Sehnsucht
- Ratt – Collage
- Razor – Decibels
- Resorte - República de Ciegos
- Rhapsody – Legendary Tales
- Rollins Band – Come In and Burn
- Rotting Christ – A Dead Poem
- Roxx Gang – Love 'Em and Leave 'Em
- Saliva – Saliva
- Salmon – Paco... Drop the Chicken
- Savatage – The Wake of Magellan
- Saxon – Unleash the Beast
- Scorpions – Deadly Sting: The Mercury Years
- Septicflesh – The Ophidian Wheel
- Sevendust – Sevendust
- Shadows Fall – Somber Eyes to the Sky
- Shootyz Groove – Hipnosis
- Six Feet Under – Warpath
- Skinlab – Bound, Gagged and Blindfolded
- Slaughter – Revolution
- Slaves on Dope – One Good Turn Deserves Another
- Slo Burn – Amusing the Amazing (EP)
- Snot – Get Some
- Sodom – 'Til Death Do Us Unite
- Solefald – The Linear Scaffold
- Soundgarden – A-Sides
- Strapping Young Lad – City
- Stratovarius – Visions
- Stratovarius – The Past and Now (compilation)
- Sugar Ray – Floored
- Symphony X – The Divine Wings of Tragedy
- Tad Morose – A Mended Rhyme
- The 3rd and the Mortal – In This Room
- The Newlydeads – The Newlydeads
- Therion – A'arab Zaraq – Lucid Dreaming
- Transport League – Superevil
- Tura Satana – Relief Through Release
- U.D.O. – Solid
- The Union Underground – The Union Underground
- Unleashed – Warrior
- Vader – Black to the Blind
- Vital Remains – Forever Underground
- Warrant – Warrant Live 86–97 (live)
- Whitesnake – Restless Heart
- Windir – Sóknardalr
- Within Temptation – Enter
- W.A.S.P. – Kill Fuck Die
- Xero – Xero (EP; early version of Linkin Park under their original name)
- Y&T – Endangered Species
- Zimmers Hole – Bound by Fire

== Disbandments ==
- Acid Bath (reformed in 2024)
- Jane's Addiction (reformed in 2001)
- Memento Mori
- Osvajači (reformed in 1999)
- Rollins Band (reformed in 1999)
- Soundgarden (reformed in 2010)
- Torque
- X Japan (reformed in 2007)

== Events ==
- Mötley Crüe and former vocalist Vince Neil reconcile their differences, and Neil rejoins the band.
- Black Sabbath reunites with the original line-up between Black Sabbath and Never Say Die!.
- Bassist Mooseman leaves Body Count and is replaced by Griz. Meanwhile, the late drummer Beatmaster V is replaced by O.T.
- After a two-year hiatus, vocalist Mike Muir and rhythm guitarist Mike Clark reform Suicidal Tendencies. Rocky George and Robert Trujillo are replaced by Dean Pleasants and Josh Paul on guitar and bass respectively, and future Bad Religion drummer Brooks Wackerman also joins.
- The Mentors frontman, Eldon Hoke, is killed when hit by a train.
- Former Slipknot vocalist, Anders Colsefni, is replaced with current lead singer of Slipknot, Corey Taylor.

Preceded by 1996	Heavy Metal Timeline; 1997	Succeeded by 1998
