= 1995 in heavy metal music =

This is a timeline documenting the events of heavy metal music in the year 1995.

== Newly formed bands ==
- Aborted
- After Forever
- Agalloch
- Agathodaimon
- Aghora
- Angelcorpse
- Arch Enemy
- Astarte
- Autumn
- Ayreon
- Azaghal
- ACT
- The Berzerker
- The Blood Divine
- Bongzilla
- Borknagar
- Buckcherry
- Carnival in Coal
- Catamenia
- Cave In
- Chevelle
- Chthonic
- Church of Misery
- Cipher System
- Coheed and Cambria
- Crazy Town
- Dahmer
- Darkest Hour
- Darzamat
- Devourment
- Diablo
- Die Apokalyptischen Reiter
- Dimension Zero
- Disembodied
- Dog Fashion Disco
- Dry Kill Logic
- Ensiferum
- Entwine
- Evergrey
- Evanescence
- Forest Stream
- The Fucking Champs
- Godsmack
- Greenmachine
- Grinspoon
- GZR
- Handsome
- Hate Forest
- I Shalt Become
- Impaled
- In Extremo
- Iron Fire
- Kraljevski Apartman
- Krieg
- Macbeth
- Månegarm
- Melechesh
- Metalucifer
- Moonsorrow
- Morning Again
- Motograter
- Nickelback
- Night in Gales
- Nortt
- One Minute Silence
- Orange Goblin
- Otyg
- Reverend Bizarre
- Secrets of the Moon
- Shadows Fall
- Shai Hulud
- Silencer
- Silent Stream of Godless Elegy
- Silentium
- Skyfire
- Skyforger
- Slipknot
- Snot
- Soilwork
- Solefald
- Sólstafir
- Sonata Arctica
- Staind
- Ten
- Thy Serpent
- Thyrfing
- Tristania
- Triumphator
- Tuatha de Danann
- Vanishing Point
- Virgin Black
- Will Haven
- Wolf
- Wolverine
- Xasthur

== Albums ==
- 24-7 Spyz – Temporarily Disconnected
- AC/DC – Ballbreaker
- Alice Cooper – Classicks
- Alice in Chains – Alice in Chains
- Amorphis – Black Winter Day (EP)
- Anathema – The Silent Enigma
- Anathema – Pentecost III (EP)
- Anal Cunt -Top 40 Hits
- Anthrax – Stomp 442
- At the Gates – Slaughter of the Soul
- Ayreon – The Final Experiment
- Bad Brains – God of Love
- Bal-Sagoth – A Black Moon Broods Over Lemuria
- Behemoth – Sventevith (Storming Near the Baltic)
- Belphegor – The Last Supper
- Benediction – The Dreams You Dread
- Beowülf – 2 Cents
- Bestial Warlust – Blood & Valour
- Black Sabbath – Cross Purposes Live (live box set)
- Black Sabbath – Forbidden
- Blind Guardian – Imaginations from the Other Side
- Bruce Dickinson – Alive in Studio A (live)
- Brujería – Raza Odiada
- Cancer – Black Faith
- Carcass – Swansong
- Cathedral – The Carnival Bizarre
- Clawfinger – Use Your Brain
- Comecon – Fable Frolic
- Craig Goldy – Better Late Than Never
- Crematory – Illusions
- Crowbar – Time Heals Nothing
- The Crown – The Burning (as Crown of Thorns)
- Cruachan – Tuatha na Gael
- D-A-D – Good Clean Family Entertainment You Can Trust
- Damaged – Passive Backseat Demon Engines (EP)
- Dangerous Toys – The Rtist 4merly Known As Dangerous Toys
- Dark Avenger – Dark Avenger
- Dark Tranquillity – The Gallery
- Darkthrone – Panzerfaust
- Dawn – Nær Solen Gar Niþer For Evogher
- Death – Symbolic
- Deceased – The Blueprints for Madness
- Def Leppard – Vault: Def Leppard Greatest Hits (1980–1995) (compilation)
- Deftones – Adrenaline
- Deeds Of Flesh – Gradually Melted (EP)
- Deicide – Once upon the Cross
- Deliverance – Camelot in Smithereens
- Dimmu Borgir – For all tid
- Dismember – Massive Killing Capacity
- Dismember – Casket Garden (EP)
- Dissection – Storm of the Light's Bane
- Dokken – Dysfunctional
- Down – NOLA
- Dream Theater – A Change of Seasons (EP)
- Earth Crisis – Destroy the Machines
- Edguy – Savage Poetry
- Excel – Seeking Refuge
- Extreme – Waiting for the Punchline
- FireHouse – 3 (FireHouse album)
- Faith No More – King for a Day... Fool for a Lifetime
- Fear Factory – Demanufacture
- Fight – A Small Deadly Space
- Flotsam and Jetsam – Drift
- Forced Entry – The Shore (EP)
- Fu Manchu – Daredevil
- Funeral – Tragedies
- Gamma Ray – Land of the Free
- The Gathering – Mandylion
- Ghostorm – Frozen in Fire
- Grave Digger – Heart of Darkness
- Grip Inc. – The Power of Inner Strength
- Gwar – Ragnarök
- Helmet – Born Annoying
- Helstar – Multiples of Black
- Iced Earth – Burnt Offerings
- Illdisposed – Submit
- Immortal – Battles in the North
- In Flames – Subterranean (EP)
- Incubus – Fungus Amongus
- Integrity – Systems Overload
- Iron Maiden – The X Factor
- Joe Satriani – Joe Satriani
- Kamelot – Eternity
- Kataklysm – Sorcery
- Katatonia – For Funerals to Come... (EP)
- Kix – Show Business
- King Diamond – The Spider's Lullabye
- Konkhra – Spit or Swallow
- Коррозия Металла - 1.966
- Krabathor – Lies
- Krabathor – The Rise of Brutality (EP)
- Kreator – Cause for Conflict
- Krisiun – Black Force Domain
- Kyuss – ...And the Circus Leaves Town
- Lacrimosa – Inferno
- Lord Belial – Kiss the Goat
- Love/Hate – Im Not Happy
- Mad Season – Above
- Malevolent Creation – Eternal
- Marilyn Manson – Smells Like Children (EP)
- Megadeth – Hidden Treasures (EP)
- Merauder – Master Killer
- Meshuggah – Destroy Erase Improve
- Metal Massacre – Metal Massacre XII (Compilation, various artists)
- Mindrot – Dawning
- Mindrot – Forlorn (EP)
- Monster Magnet – Dopes to Infinity
- Moonspell – Wolfheart
- Morbid Angel – Domination
- Morgana Lefay – Sanctified
- Mortician – House by the Cemetery (EP)
- Mortification – Primitive Rhythm Machine
- Motörhead – Sacrifice
- Mr. Bungle – Disco Volante
- My Dying Bride – The Angel and the Dark River
- Naglfar – Vittra
- Necrophagist – Necrophagist (demo)
- Nembrionic – Psycho One Hundred
- Nevermore – Nevermore
- Night in Gales – Sylphlike (EP)
- Nightfall – Athenian Echoes
- Ningen Isu – Odoru Issunboushi
- Nothingface – Nothingface
- Novembers Doom – Amid Its Hallowed Mirth
- On Thorns I Lay – Sounds of Beautiful Experience
- Oomph! – Defekt
- Opeth – Orchid
- Orphanage – Oblivion
- Ozzy Osbourne – Ozzmosis
- Paradise Lost – Draconian Times
- Pessimist – Absence of Light (EP)
- Powerman 5000 – The Blood-Splat Rating System
- Primus – Tales from the Punchbowl
- Quiet Riot – Down to the Bone
- Rage – Black in Mind
- Rainbow – Stranger in Us All
- Rammstein – Herzeleid
- RAMP – Intersection
- Red Hot Chili Peppers – One Hot Minute
- Riot – The Brethren of the Long House
- Roxx Gang – The Voodoo You Love
- Running Wild – Masquerade
- Saint Vitus – Die Healing
- Samael – Rebellion (EP)
- Savatage – Dead Winter Dead
- Savatage – Japan Live '94 (live)
- Savatage – Ghost in the Ruins – A Tribute to Criss Oliva (live)
- Saxon – Dogs of War
- Sentenced – Amok
- Sentenced – Love & Death (EP)
- Septicflesh – Esoptron
- Seventh Avenue – Tales Of Tales
- Sinister – Hate
- Six Feet Under – Haunted
- Skepticism – Stormcrowfleet
- Skid Row – Subhuman Race
- Skyclad – The Silent Whales of Lunar Sea
- Slash's Snakepit – It's Five O'Clock Somewhere (album)
- Slaughter – Fear No Evil
- Sodom – Masquerade in Blood
- Strapping Young Lad – Heavy as a Really Heavy Thing
- Stratovarius – Fourth Dimension
- Stuck Mojo – Snappin' Necks
- Suffocation – Pierced from Within
- Sugar Ray – Lemonade and Brownies
- Summoning – Lugburz
- Summoning – Minas Morgul
- Symphony X – The Damnation Game
- Tad Morose – Sender of Thoughts
- Tankard – The Tankard
- Theatre of Tragedy – Theatre of Tragedy
- Therapy? – Infernal Love
- Therion – Lepaca Kliffoth
- The 3rd and the Mortal – Nightswan (EP)
- Tony MacAlpine – Evolution
- Transport League – Stallion Showcase
- Trouble – Plastic Green Head
- Tuff – Religious Fix
- Unanimated – Ancient God of Evil
- Uncle Slam – When God Dies
- Unleashed – Victory
- Uriah Heep – Sea of Light
- Steve Vai – Alien Love Secrets (EP)
- Vader – De Profundis
- Van Halen – Balance
- Ved Buens Ende - Written in Waters
- Vince Neil – Carved in Stone
- Virgin Black – Virgin Black (demo)
- Virgin Steele – The Marriage of Heaven and Hell Part I
- Vital Remains – Into Cold Darkness
- Voivod – Negatron
- W.A.S.P. – Still Not Black Enough
- Warrant – Ultraphobic
- Warrior Soul – The Space Age Playboys
- White Zombie – Astro-Creep: 2000
- Y&T – Musically Incorrect
- Yngwie Malmsteen – Magnum Opus

== Disbandments ==
- Accept
- Beowülf
- Child's Play
- The Cult
- Excel
- Kyuss (in October)
- Living Colour
- Pungent Stench
- Saint Vitus
- Suicidal Tendencies
- Uncle Slam
- Visceral Evisceration

== Events ==
- Long Beach, California-based hard rock and heavy metal radio station KNAC (Pure Rock) goes off the air and is replaced by a Spanish-language radio station KBUE (Que Buena).
- Motörhead's guitarist Michael "Würzel" Burston leaves the band.
- Ingo Schwichtenberg of Helloween dies.
- Necrophagist's guitarist Jan-Paul Herm and drummer Raphael Kempermann leave the band. Kempermann is replaced by Daniel Silva.
- S.O.B.'s vocalist Tottsuan commits suicide by jumping onto railroad tracks.
- Ralf Scheepers leaving Gamma Ray year earlier, Kai Hansen goes on lead vocals. First time since his 1985 debut album Walls of Jericho.
- Matt Holt joins Nothingface, replacing David Gabbard as singer.

Preceded by 1994	Heavy Metal Timeline; 1995	Succeeded by 1996
