= 1999 in heavy metal music =

This is a timeline documenting the events of heavy metal music in the year 1999.

== Newly formed bands ==
- 3 Inches of Blood
- 10 Years
- A Life Once Lost
- A Perfect Circle
- Abaddon
- Aeon
- Amenra
- Anaal Nathrakh
- Andromeda
- The Angelic Process
- Arallu
- Arthemis
- The Autumn Offering
- Avantasia
- Avenged Sevenfold
- Becoming the Archetype
- Battlelore
- Blaze
- Beautiful Creatures
- Before the Dawn
- Beyond the Bridge
- Biomechanical
- Bleeding Through
- Blindead
- Blood Stain Child
- Bloodlined Calligraphy
- Breaking Benjamin
- Burning Point
- Burnt by the Sun
- Darkspace
- DragonForce (then DragonHeart)
- Dragonland
- Divinity Destroyed
- Dominia
- Dream Evil
- Dreamtale
- Earshot
- Enter Shikari
- Evile
- Falconer
- Five Pointe O
- For My Pain...
- Forgotten Tomb
- Grand Magus
- Halford
- Hour of Penance
- Kalmah
- Killswitch Engage
- The Kovenant
- Lamb of God (formed from Burn the Priest)
- Lifer (then Strangers with Candy)
- Lumsk
- Memorain
- Metalium
- Methods of Mayhem
- Metsatöll
- Mors Principium Est
- MullMuzzler
- Old Man Gloom
- Protest the Hero
- Psycroptic
- QueenAdreena (then Queen Adreena)
- Raintime
- The Red Chord
- Sargeist
- Sabaton
- Seether (as Saron Gas)
- Shade Empire
- Shadowkeep
- Sikth
- Silent Force
- Sleepytime Gorilla Museum
- Sunstorm
- Tomahawk
- Toxic Holocaust
- Trivium
- Ufomammut
- Voyager

== Reformed bands ==
- Armored Saint
- Destruction (Schmier's comeback)
- Lost Horizon (reformed as Highlander, name was changed soon after)
- Pungent Stench
- Rollins Band
- Skid Row
- White Lion

== Albums ==
- Aborted – The Purity of Perversion
- Agalloch – Pale Folklore
- Akercocke – Rape of the Bastard Nazarene
- Alabama Thunderpussy – River City Revival
- Alice Cooper – The Life and Crimes of Alice Cooper (box set)
- Alice in Chains – Nothing Safe: Best of the Box (compilation)
- Alice in Chains – Music Bank (box set)
- Alien Ant Farm – Greatest Hits
- Anal Cunt - It Just Gets Worse
- American Head Charge – Trepanation
- Amon Amarth – The Avenger
- Amorphis – Tuonela (album)
- Anathema – Judgement
- Angelcorpse – The Inexorable
- Annihilator - Criteria for a Black Widow
- Anvil – Speed of Sound
- Arch Enemy – Burning Bridges
- Atari Teenage Riot – 60 Second Wipe Out
- Backyard Babies – Total 13
- Bal-Sagoth – The Power Cosmic
- Bang Tango – Greatest Tricks
- Bang Tango – Untied & Live
- Behemoth – Satanica
- Biohazard – New World Disorder
- Black Label Society – Sonic Brew
- Botch – We Are the Romans
- Broken Teeth – Broken Teeth
- Bruce Dickinson – Scream for Me Brazil (live)
- Buckcherry – Buckcherry (album)
- Burn the Priest – Burn the Priest
- Burzum – Hliðskjálf (album)
- Cannibal Corpse – Bloodthirst (album)
- Chevelle – Point #1
- Children of Bodom – Hatebreeder
- Chris Cornell – Euphoria Morning
- Cinderella – Live at the Key Club
- Coal Chamber – Chamber Music
- Control Denied – The Fragile Art of Existence
- Cradle of Filth – From the Cradle to Enslave (EP)
- Crazy Town – The Gift of Game
- The Crown – Hell is Here
- Dangerous Toys – Vitamins and Crash Helmets Tour – Greatest Hits Live
- Danzig – Danzig 6:66: Satan's Child
- Darkthrone – Ravishing Grimness
- Dark Tranquility – Projector
- Def Leppard – Euphoria
- Destruction – The Butcher Strikes Back (demo)
- Devourment - Molesting The Decapitated
- DGeneration – Through The Darkness
- The Dillinger Escape Plan – Calculating Infinity
- Dimmu Borgir – Spiritual Black Dimensions
- Dog Fashion Disco – The Embryo's in Bloom
- Dope – Felons and Revolutionaries
- Drain STH – Freaks of Nature
- Dream Theater – Metropolis Pt. 2: Scenes from a Memory
- Edguy – Theater of Salvation
- Emperor – IX Equilibrium
- Espécimen (MX) - Biogénesis Final
- Eternal Tears of Sorrow – Vilda Mánnu
- Evergrey – Solitude, Dominance, Tragedy
- Fall of the Leafe – August Wernicke
- Filter – Title of Record
- Finntroll – Midnattens Widunder
- Gamma Ray – Power Plant
- Godflesh – Us and Them
- God Forbid – Reject the Sickness
- Gilby Clarke – 99 Live
- Graveworm – As the Angels Reach the Beauty
- Grip Inc. – Solidify
- Gwar – We Kill Everything
- H.I.M. – Razorblade Romance
- Hate Eternal – Conquering the Throne
- Hypocrisy – Hypocrisy
- Immolation – Failures for Gods
- Immortal – At the Heart of Winter
- Incubus – Make Yourself
- In Flames – Colony
- Integrity – Integrity 2000
- Jetboy – Lost & Found
- Kamelot – The Fourth Legacy
- Katatonia – Tonight's Decision
- Keep of Kalessin – Agnen: A Journey Through the Dark
- Konkhra – Come Down Cold
- Korn – Issues
- Kreator – Endorama
- Lacrimosa – Elodia
- Lacuna Coil – In a Reverie
- L.A. Guns – Greatest Hits and Black Beauties
- L.A. Guns – Shrinking Violet
- Lefay – Symphony of the Damned, Re-symphonised (re-recording)
- Lefay – The Seventh Seal
- Limp Bizkit – Significant Other
- Lock Up – Pleasures Pave Sewers
- Love/Hate – Let's Eat
- Tony MacAlpine – Master of Paradise
- Machine Head – The Burning Red
- Yngwie Malmsteen – Alchemy
- Marduk – Panzer Division Marduk
- Marilyn Manson – The Last Tour on Earth (live)
- Mass Hysteria – Contraddiction
- Mercyful Fate – 9
- Megadeth – Risk
- Metal Church – Masterpeace
- Metallica – S&M (live)
- Metalium – Millennium Metal – Chapter One
- Ministry – Dark Side of the Spoon
- Mr. Bungle – California
- Moonspell – The Butterfly Effect
- Morgion – Solinari
- Mortician – Chainsaw Dismemberment
- Mortification – Hammer of God
- Mötley Crüe – Supersonic and Demonic Relics
- Motörhead – Everything Louder Than Everyone Else (live)
- Mushroomhead – M3
- My Dying Bride – The Light at the End of the World
- Napalm Death – Words from the Exit Wound
- Necrophobic – The Third Antichrist
- Neurosis – Times of Grace
- New American Shame – New American Shame
- Nevermore – Dreaming Neon Black
- Nine Inch Nails – The Fragile
- Novembers Doom – Of Sculptured Ivy and Stone Flowers
- Occult – Of Flesh and Blood
- Oomph! – Plastik
- Opeth – Still Life
- Orchid – Chaos Is Me
- Overkill – Necroshine
- Pain – Rebirth
- Pessimist – Blood for the Gods
- Pentagram – Review Your Choices
- Pig Destroyer – Pig Destroyer / Gnob (split EP)
- Pitchshifter – Un-United Kingdom (EP)
- P.O.D. – The Fundamental Elements of Southtown
- Poison the Well – The Opposite of December
- Powerman 5000 – Tonight the Stars Revolt!
- Pretty Boy Floyd – Porn Stars (album)
- Primal Fear – Jaws of Death
- Primus – Antipop
- Pro-Pain – Act of God
- Queensrÿche – Q2K
- Quiet Riot – Alive and Well
- Rage – Ghosts
- Rage Against the Machine – The Battle of Los Angeles
- Rammstein – Live Aus Berlin (live)
- Ratt – Ratt
- Reveille – Laced
- Rotting Christ – Sleep of the Angels
- Samael – Eternal
- Satyricon – Rebel Extravaganza
- Scorpions – Eye II Eye
- Sebastian Bach – Bring 'Em Bach Alive!
- Septicflesh – Revolution DNA
- Serial Joe – Face Down
- Sevendust – Home
- Shootyz Groove – High Definition
- Sinergy – Beware the Heavens
- Six Feet Under – Maximum Violence
- Skinlab – Disembody: The New Flesh
- Slaughter – Back to Reality
- Slipknot – Slipknot
- Sodom – Code Red
- Solefald – Neonism
- Sonata Arctica – Ecliptica
- Staind – Dysfunction
- Static-X – Wisconsin Death Trip
- Steve Vai – The Ultra Zone
- Stone Temple Pilots – No. 4
- Stratovarius – The Chosen Ones (compilation)
- Suicidal Tendencies – Freedumb
- Summoning – Stronghold
- Testament – The Gathering
- The Black Halos – The Black Halos
- Therapy? – Suicide Pact – You First
- Therion – Crowning of Atlantis
- Throwdown – Beyond Repair
- Tristania – Beyond the Veil
- Type O Negative – World Coming Down
- Underoath – Act of Depression
- uneXpect – Utopia
- Vintersorg – Ödemarkens son
- Virgin Steele – The House of Atreus Act I
- Vision of Disorder – For the Bleeders
- Warrant – Greatest & Latest
- W.A.S.P. – Helldorado
- White Skull – Tales From The North
- Will Haven – WHVN
- Windir - Arntor
- Zao – Liberate Te Ex Inferis

== Disbandments ==
- Death
- Far (reformed in 2008)
- Fatal Opera
- Mercyful Fate- on hiatus

== Events ==
- Drummer Tommy Lee leaves Mötley Crüe.
- Ex-drummer of Megadeth Gar Samuelson dies at age 41 from liver failure.
- Singer Blaze Bayley leaves Iron Maiden, while Bruce Dickinson and guitarist Adrian Smith re-join.
- Kittie bassist Tanya Candler quits. She is later replaced by Talena Atfield.
- ICS Vortex joins Dimmu Borgir on bass/backing vocals. Drummer Nicholas Barker leaves Cradle of Filth and joins as well.
- Singer Naoki Hashimoto left Outrage.
- Mudvayne signs with Epic Records.
- Poison appear in an episode of Behind the Music.

Preceded by 1998	Heavy Metal Timeline; 1999	Succeeded by 2000
