= 1998 in heavy metal music =

This is a timeline documenting the events of heavy metal music in the year 1998.

== Newly formed bands ==
- 8 Foot Sativa
- 40 Below Summer
- Aarni
- Abdullah
- All That Remains
- Antagonist
- Arma Angelus
- Ásmegin
- At Vance
- Atreyu
- Axenstar
- Azarath
- Baptism
- Benighted
- Betzefer
- Black Label Society
- Blood Red Throne
- Bloodbath
- Bullet for My Valentine (as Jeff Killed John)
- Calico System
- Cataract
- Chimaira
- Circle of Dead Children
- CKY
- Clandestine Blaze
- Cog
- Crucified Barbara
- Cult of Luna
- Dalriada
- Darkane
- Deathspell Omega
- Demons & Wizards
- Edenbridge
- Ephel Duath
- Every Time I Die
- Fair to Midland
- Fairyland
- Fantômas
- Firewind
- Freedom Call
- From Zero
- Full Scale (as Full Scale Deflection)
- Gordian Knot
- High on Fire
- Hopesfall
- Horse the Band
- Ill Niño
- Leviathan
- Lock Up
- Lunatica
- Maximum the Hormone
- The Meads of Asphodel
- Mnemic
- Noumena
- Odd Crew (as Kaskadiori)
- Peccatum
- Pressure 4-5
- Ram-Zet
- Rebaelliun
- Ritual Carnage
- Rob Zombie
- Shape of Despair
- Skindred
- Stormwarrior
- Sunn O)))
- Susperia
- The Project MCMXCIX
- Thy Catafalque
- Twilightning
- Týr
- Underoath
- Unearth
- Unida
- Vision Divine
- Watain
- Weakling
- Winds
- Wormed
- Wyrd
- Zyklon

== Reformed bands ==
- Metal Church

== Albums ==
- Agathodaimon – Blacken The Angel
- Alabama Thunderpussy – Rise Again
- Altar – Provoke
- Amon Amarth – Once Sent from the Golden Hall
- Arghoslent – Galloping Through The Battle Ruins
- Anathema – Alternative 4
- Angelcorpse – Exterminate
- Angra – Fireworks
- Anthrax – Volume 8: The Threat Is Real
- Apocalyptica – Inquisition Symphony
- Arch Enemy – Stigmata
- Atreyu – Visions (EP)
- Ayreon – Into the Electric Castle
- Sebastian Bach – Bring em Bach Alive
- Backyard Babies – Total 13
- Behemoth – Pandemonic Incantations
- Benediction – Grind Bastard
- Bestial Warlust – Satan's Fist
- Black Label Society – Sonic Brew
- Black Sabbath – Reunion (live)
- Blind Guardian – Nightfall in Middle-Earth
- Bolt Thrower – Mercenary
- Borknagar – The Archaic Course
- Botch – American Nervoso
- Bruce Dickinson – The Chemical Wedding
- Cannibal Corpse – Gallery of Suicide
- Jerry Cantrell – Boggy Depot
- Candlemass – Dactylis Glomerata
- Cathedral – Caravan Beyond Redemption
- Children of Bodom – Something Wild (Worldwide release)
- Clutch – The Elephant Riders
- Cold – Cold
- Converge – When Forever Comes Crashing
- Covenant – Nexus Polaris
- Cradle of Filth – Cruelty and the Beast
- Crowbar – Odd Fellows Rest
- Cryptopsy – Whisper Supremacy
- Dark Funeral – Vobiscum Satanas
- Dawn – Slaughtersun (Crown of the Triarchy)
- Death – The Sound of Perseverance
- Deep Purple – Abandon
- Destruction – The Least Successful Human Cannonball
- Devin Townsend – Christeen + 4 Demos (EP)
- Devin Townsend – Infinity
- Diecast – Undo the Wicked
- The Dillinger Escape Plan – Under the Running Board (EP)
- Dimmu Borgir – Godless Savage Garden (compilation)
- Dream Theater – Once in a LIVEtime (live)
- Dying Fetus – Killing on Adrenaline
- Earth Crisis – Breed the Killers
- Edguy – Vain Glory Opera
- Enslaved – Blodhemn
- Eldritch – El Niño
- Exhumed – Gore Metal
- Fall of the Leafe – Evanescent, Everfading
- Far – Water & Solutions
- Fear Factory – Obsolete
- Firehouse – Category 5
- Freak Kitchen – Freak Kitchen
- The Gathering – How to Measure a Planet?
- Genitorturers – Sin City
- Godsmack – Godsmack
- Gorgoroth – Destroyer – or About How to Philosophize with the Hammer
- Gorguts – Obscura
- Grave Digger – Knights of the Cross
- HammerFall – Legacy of Kings
- The Haunted – The Haunted
- Helloween – Better Than Raw
- Iced Earth – Something Wicked This Way Comes
- Incantation – Diabolical Conquest
- Inquisition - Into the Infernal Regions of the Ancient Cult
- Iron Maiden – Virtual XI
- Jag Panzer – The Age of Mastery
- Kamelot – Siége Perilous
- Kataklysm – Victims of this Fallen World
- Katatonia – Discouraged Ones
- Kid Rock – Devil Without a Cause
- King Diamond – Voodoo
- Kiss – Psycho Circus
- Korn – Follow the Leader
- Krabathor – Orthodox
- Krisiun – Apocalyptic Revelation
- L.A. Guns – Wasted
- Leprosy – Llora Chiapas
- Madball – Look My Way
- Malevolent Creation – The Fine Art of Murder
- Yngwie Malmsteen – Concerto Suite for Electric Guitar and Orchestra in Em, Opus 1
- Yngwie Malmsteen – Double Live! (live)
- Marduk – Nightwing
- Mercenary – First Breath
- Mercyful Fate – Dead Again
- Meshuggah – Chaosphere
- Metal Church – Live (live)
- Metallica – Garage Inc. (compilation)
- Mindrot – Soul
- Marilyn Manson – Mechanical Animals
- Monster Magnet – Powertrip
- Moonspell – Sin/Pecado
- Morbid Angel – Formulas Fatal to the Flesh
- Mortician – Zombie Apocalypse (EP)
- Mortification – Triumph of Mercy
- Mötley Crüe – Greatest Hits (compilation)
- Motörhead – Snake Bite Love
- My Dying Bride – 34.788%... Complete
- Napalm Death – Words from the Exit Wound
- Nembrionic – Incomplete
- Nightwish – Oceanborn
- Night in Gales – Thunderbeast
- Nile – Amongst the Catacombs of Nephren-Ka
- Nothingface – An Audio Guide to Everyday Atrocity
- Old Man's Child – Ill-Natured Spiritual Invasion
- One Minute Silence – Available in All Colours
- Oomph! – Unrein
- Opeth – My Arms, Your Hearse
- Orange Goblin – Time Travelling Blues
- Orgy – Candyass
- Pig Destroyer – Explosions in Ward 6
- Pitchshifter – www.pitchshifter.com
- Pretty Boy Floyd – A Tale of Sex, Designer Drugs and The Death of Rock N Roll
- Primal Fear – Primal Fear
- Pro-Pain – Pro-Pain
- Queens of the Stone Age – Queens of the Stone Age
- Rage – XIII
- RAMP - Evolution, Devolution, Revolution
- Refused – The Shape of Punk to Come
- Rhapsody – Symphony of Enchanted Lands
- Ritual Carnage – The Highest Law
- Rob Zombie – Hellbilly Deluxe
- David Lee Roth – DLR Band
- Rotting – Crushed
- Running Wild – The Rivalry
- Rush – Different Stages (live)
- Samael – Exodus (EP)
- Savatage – The Wake of Magellan (in United States)
- Sentenced – Frozen
- Septicflesh – A Fallen Temple
- Sepultura – Against
- Sinister – Aggressive Measures
- Skepticism – Lead and Aether
- Skid Row – 40 Seasons: The Best of Skid Row (compilation)
- Slayer – Diabolus in Musica
- Soilent Green – A String of Lies (EP)
- Soilent Green – Sewn Mouth Secrets
- Solitude Aeturnus - Adagio
- Soilwork – Steelbath Suicide
- Soulburn – Feeding on Angels
- Soulfly – Soulfly
- Strapping Young Lad – No Sleep 'till Bedtime: Live in Australia (live)
- Stratovarius – Visions of Europe (live)
- Stratovarius – Destiny
- Stuck Mojo – Rising
- Dan Swanö – Moontower
- Symphony X – Twilight in Olympus
- System of a Down – System of a Down
- Tankard – Disco Destroyer
- The Sins of Thy Beloved – Lake of Sorrow
- Theatre of Tragedy – Aégis
- Therapy? – Semi-Detached
- Therion – Vovin
- Trail of Tears – Disclosure in Red
- Tristania – Widow's Weeds
- Turbonegro – Apocalypse Dudes
- 2wo – Voyeurs
- Umbra et Imago – Machina Mundi
- Union – Union
- Ugly Kid Joe – The Very Best-As Ugly As It Gets
- Unsane – Occupational Hazard
- Vader – Kingdom (EP)
- Van Halen – Van Halen III
- Vintersorg – Hedniskhjärtad (EP)
- Vintersorg – Till fjälls
- Virgin Black – Trance (EP)
- Virgin Steele – Invictus
- Vision of Disorder – Imprint
- Vomitorial Corpulence - Skin Stripper
- Zao (American band) – Where Blood and Fire Bring Rest

== Disbandments ==
- 24-7 Spyz (reformed in 2003)
- Count Raven (reformed in 2003)
- Destruction (reformed in 1999)
- Faith No More (reformed in 2009)
- Handsome
- Helmet (reformed in 2004)
- Snot (reformed in 2008)
- Vulcain

== Events ==
- Aerosmith becomes the first rock band to debut at #1 on the Billboard Hot 100 with the single "I Don't Want to Miss a Thing"
- Mustis joins Dimmu Borgir on keyboards.
- Rob Halford of Judas Priest announces his homosexuality in an MTV interview.
- Hideto "hide" Matsumoto, guitarist of the Japanese band X Japan, commits suicide at the age of 33.
- Poison singer Bret Michaels directs and stars in the film A Letter from Death Row.

Preceded by 1997	Heavy Metal Timeline; 1998	Succeeded by 1999
