= Morgion =

Morgion may refer to:

- Morgion (band), an American doom-metal band
- a fictional entity in the Dragonlance universe
