= The Prophecy (English band) =

British doom metal band

- Origin: Halifax, England
- Genres: Doom metal, death-doom, progressive metal
- Years active: 2001–present
- Labels: Aural (Code 666)
- Members: Matt Lawson; Greg O'Shea; John Bennett; Gavin Parkinson; Katie Colbrook
- Website: the-prophecy.net

The Prophecy is an English progressive doom metal band from Yorkshire.

== History ==
The Prophecy was formed in autumn of 2001 when Greg O'Shea and John Bennett from "The Local Family Butcherers," as the band was known at the time, met up with vocalist Matt Lawson, in the now demolished Empress pub in Bradford. The band immediately went on to record their first demo CD, Her Embrace, My Ruin which although never released spurred the band on to get serious.

The band then spent six months ensconced in their rehearsal room writing and developing ideas before returning to the studio to record the To End All Hope demo. This demo soon began to grab people's attention and it was not long before The Prophecy were approached by the organisers of the Doomination tour with Morgion and Mourning Beloveth.

Now with a full European tour booked for them, the Prophecy needed an album and so they went back into the studio in the autumn of 2002 to record their debut album Ashes.

The Doomination tour took place in February 2003 starting in Ireland and passing through England, France, Spain, Portugal, Holland and Belgium. Along with Morgion, Mourning Beloveth and The Prophecy, a pantheon of bands played support slots on the Doomination metal tour, such as Autumnal, Pantheist, Desire, Process of Guilt, Karseron, Despond and Ataraxie .

The Prophecy's debut album Ashes was picked up by Blackdoom Records, founded by members of My Dying Bride, Hamish Glencross and Andrew Craighan.

In August 2003, The Prophecy went on to tour the US for a full month with Mourning Beloveth and Orodruin. The headliners Morgion had to pull out of the tour. With 18 shows across 13 states the band clocked up 13000 miles on their tour bus and crossed the continent twice. The tour ended with an appearance at the SHoD fest in Portland, Oregon.

The band were then featured in Terrorizer magazine, with a track from their album The Killing Fields being included on the cover of the issue. The band made an appearance in Metalhammer Italy before embarking on a further European tour, this time supporting My Dying Bride.

The Unholy Trinity tour took place on the Halloween weekend of 2003 with shows at London Astoria, Utrecht Tivoli and Antwerp Hof Ter Loo. The tour saw sold out to capacity audiences for each of the three shows and the band played to over 2000 at the Astoria. London was the best for sheer size and the wealth of support the band received from the fans while on stage, Antwerp was the worst due to poor stage setup and technical problems which were out of the band's control.

The band kept touring throughout 2004 with an appearance at the Bloodstock Open Air Festival and a further two tours of Europe the latter being a three-week headlining tour with Australia's The Eternal in support. In September the band entered the studio to start recording Revelations the followup to their debut. But in early 2005 growing tensions within the band came to the fore, causing lineup changes that left The Prophecy without a bass player or second guitar. Relief came in the summer of 2005 when Gavin Parkinson of Tefra was recruited to fill bass duties. He was quickly integrated into the band and for the first time in almost a year the band began to write new songs in earnest.

With just two new songs fully written, the band then embarked upon "The Mist of Death Halloween 2005" tour with fellow doom band Insanity Reigns Supreme, and bands such as Thurisaz, Ten 13, Darmazat, and The Legion of Hethera. The year was rounded off with support slots with My Dying Bride for which John Bennett had to play not only The Prophecy's set but also for My Dying Bride's as well, having been helping out My Dying Bride on drum duties since Shaun Steels' long-term injury.

Work on the Revelations album began in earnest in the winter of 2005 but then suffered a six-month delay while the studio relocated to alternative premises. In the meantime the band renewed their commitment to playing live by playing a whole host of gigs. These included support slots with Pagan's Mind and Powerquest, a trip to Northern Ireland with Honey For Christ, a UK and European tour with Seasons End, an appearance at the Dutch Doom Day Festival and a supporting November's Doom.

Revelations was released on 5 February 2007. Shortly after, the band began to announce tour dates and making a number of high-profile appearances. The first of these was playing to over a thousand people at the last ever date in Bradford Rios. In June, the band made an appearance at the Day of Darkness Festival in Ireland and then went on tour playing the Pontape Na Canela Festival in Portugal. However, while on the way to the Portuguese festival, disaster struck when the band's tour bus broke down, leaving them and fellow metal band Honey for Christ stranded in Portugal. Eventually both bands managed to secure flights home but unfortunately had to cancel the rest of their tour. The Prophecy did make an appearance at the Doom Over Vienna II Festival as part of a week long tour across Germany, Holland and Belgium.

As 2008 approached, the band went into a hiatus from live shows to focus on completion of their third studio album, making only a brief tour in April in which they played the biannual Opblaaspop Festival in Sas Van Gent as well as making their first appearance in the Czech Republic. In July they entered Priory Studios in Sutton Coldfields to record their third album, Into The Light.

On 13 November 2008, the band announced that they had signed a deal with Code666 Records from Italy to release their new album, with a scheduled release date of 20 February 2009. Shortly after the release of the album, the band made an appearance at the annual Moscow Doom Festival in April 2009. Over summer and early autumn the band went on to play a series of mini tours in the UK, Republic of Ireland, Germany, Holland and Belgium, making a rare second appearance at the Dutch Doom Day festival. In August The Prophecy once again entered 'Priory Studios' to record a one off track featured on 'Code 666' ten-year anniversary CD 'Better Undead than Alive 2" released at Christmas. The Prophecy were also to feature on the 2009 released DVD 'Chronicles of Doom' alongside Reverend Bizarre, Saturnus, The Gates of Slumber and many more. The DVD was professionally shot in 2006 at the Dutch Doom day released by 'Weird Truth' productions from Japan.

2010 saw the band headlining the Malta DMA festival and then making their first appearances in the People's Republic of China where the band performed at the Yi County Camping Festival in Heibei Province and the MIDI modern music Festival in Beijing as well as appearing on Central China Television. Choosing to limit their live performances in order to concentrate on writing material for their as yet untitled fourth studio album, the band refrained from performing live for much of the rest of 2010 and 2011 until August 2011 where the band made history by becoming the first UK metal band to perform in the Republic of Cuba when they joined the annual Brutalfest tour.

The Prophecy have recently recorded their fourth studio album entitled Salvation at Priory studios in Sutton Coldfield.

The Prophecy took to the stage at Bloodstock Open Air Festival 2013 with Terrorizer Magazine saying 'The Prophecy put in a fucking marvellous set of evocative death/doom that gets heads banging in the most morose way possible. Bravo!' and have announced they will be returning to play the Malta Doom Festival later in 2013.

== Discography ==
=== Demos ===
- Her Embrace My Ruin (2001)
- To End All Hope (2002)

=== Albums ===
- Ashes (2003)
- Revelations (2006)
- Into the Light (2009)
- Salvation (2013)
- Origins (2017)
