= Solinari =

Solinari may refer to:

- Solinari (album), a 1999 album by Morgion
- Solinari, Greece, a town in Boeotia
