= Doomination =

Former touring metal music festival

Doomination was a touring metal music festival with performances by many doom metal and death metal groups. It was organized by the members of the now defunct American band Morgion, the Irish doom metal band Mourning Beloveth and the Yorkshire progressive doom metal band The Prophecy. The tour was intended to bring together the best of the underground doom metal and doom/death metal acts to create a traveling doom metal showcase, helping to bring new life into the scene and spurring on many bands to be more adventurous when considering when, where and how to tour. The original tour and the tours which followed were well received by the metal press with articles and reviews being published in Metal Hammer, Terrorizer, Loud, Feedback and Abode for Forlorn Souls, the latter publishing full interviews with each of the three Doomination bands as well as excerpts from Christian Moore-Wainwright's (ex The Prophecy guitarist) tour diary.

== History ==
The first Doomination tour started on 7 February 2003 at Eamon Dorans in Dublin with another ten dates in the UK, France, Spain, Portugal, Belgium and The Netherlands. The core acts of the tour were Morgion, Mourning Beloveth and The Prophecy. Among the acts participating in the tour were Ataraxie, Autumnal, Desire, Despond, Karseron, Panthiest and Process of Guilt.

The Doomination of Europe was followed in August 2003 by The Doomination of America. Organised by members of Morgion, this tour had Mourning Beloveth, The Prophecy and Orodruin. Morgion had to pull out of the tour due to a car accident involving the guitarist Gary Griffiths. The tour had a host of supporting acts including Vex, The Gates Of Slumber, Asunder and Negative Reaction.

The last leg of the Doomination Tour was scheduled over three weeks across September and October 2004. This tour had The Prophecy and the Australian doom band The Eternal. The tour widened its coverage, visiting Luxembourg, The Netherlands, Belgium, Germany, Hungary, Italy, Spain, Portugal and the UK. The tour followed the ideals of the previous Doomination tours by inviting the best of the underground to play in support of the tour.

An attempt to organise The Doomination of Europe III was made in 2007 with Keen of The Crow (with former Morgion Members). However, because of costs, the tour did not go ahead.
