= Buy Now... Saved Later =

Studio album by One Minute Silence
- Released: 10 April 2000
- Recorded: September–November 1999 at Chapel Studios Lincs
- Genre: Rap metal, nu metal
- Length: 57:31
- Label: Universal
- Producer: Colin Richardson

One Minute Silence chronology
Available in All Colors (1998)	Buy Now... Saved Later (2000)	One Lie Fits All (2003)

Professional ratings
Review scores
Source	Rating
AllMusic	2.5/5 stars
Blabbermouth.net	6/10 stars
Kerrang!	4/5 stars
NME	4/10

Buy Now... Saved Later is the second studio album by Irish metal band One Minute Silence, the follow-up to Available in All Colors. It was released in April 2000 on V2 Records and was dedicated "to the memory of Neville Anthony Lynch". In contrast to the hip-hop-metal tinge the first album had, Buy Now... Saved Later has a more traditional guitar-metal sound, produced by Colin Richardson.

The cover art features a woman with devil horns, seemingly made of (or at least covered with) dollar notes and holding a Bible in her right hand, and a bitten apple in the left (a reference to temptation). Behind her is a grey One Minute Silence logo which also appears on the CD, on a black background. The song "Holy Man" appears in the 2000 video game ECW Anarchy Rulz.

== Performance ==
Buy Now... Saved Later was One Minute Silence's highest-charting album, reaching number 61 in the UK Albums Chart.

== Track listing ==
All lyrics are written by B. Barry; all music is composed by One Minute Silence, except where noted.

No.	Title	Music	Length
1.	"Rise and Shine"		3:14
2.	"1845"	One Minute Silence & C. Ignatiou	2:46
3.	"Holy Man"		4:04
4.	"It's Just a Ride"		3:37
5.	"Food for the Brain"		3:46
6.	"Fish out of Water"		4:23
7.	"Roof of the World"	One Minute Silence & C. Ignatiou	4:08
8.	"16 Stone Pig"		3:29
9.	"210 Dog Years"		3:46
10.	"If I Can Change"		5:15
11.	"A Spoonful of Sugar"		4:42
12.	"On Deaf Ears"		4:10
13.	"A Day in the Light of"		4:16
14.	"Words"		5:55
Total length:			57:31

Japanese edition bonus tracks
No.	Title	Length
15.	"14 Years"	3:59
16.	"I Feel Nothing"	2:37

The songs "It's Just a Ride" and "If I Can Change" were partly inspired by comedian Bill Hicks.
