= John Bennett (drummer) =

British drummer

John Bennett is a British drummer, and a founding member of the progressive doom/death metal band, The Prophecy. With The Prophecy, Bennett has completed several tours of Europe and the United States, and has also recorded three albums.

Bennett also played drums for fellow doom metal band My Dying Bride for two years, filling in for Shaun Steels while Steels recovered from an ankle injury. Bennett played as a session musician on the A Line of Deathless Kings album. In 2007 he announced that he could not continue to play with My Dying Bride.

== Discography ==
Year	Band	Title
2001	The Prophecy	Her Embrace My Ruin (demo)
2002	The Prophecy	To End All Hope
2003	The Prophecy	Ashes
2006	The Prophecy	Revelations
2006	My Dying Bride	A Line of Deathless Kings
2006	My Dying Bride	Deeper Down
2009	The Prophecy	Into the Light

== Equipment ==
- Premier Percussion Cabria Exclusive (10”, 12”, 14”Ft, 22” & 14”Sn)
- Tama 12” side accent snare
- DW 9000 Hi Hat
- DW 5000 Pedal (DBL)
- Premier Percussion Hardware
- 22” Zildjian Z Custom power ride
- 20” Zildjian A Custom China
- 18” Zildjian Z Custom projection crash
- 16” Zildjian Z Custom rock crash
- 16” Zildjian Avedis rock crash
- 14” Zildjian Oriental china
- 13” Zildjian A Custom mastersound hi-hats
- 12” Zildjian Z Custom splash
- 8” Zildjian A Custom splash
- Roland TD20BK V Drums
- Hardcase cases
- Vic Firth 5A Sticks
