= The Carnage Ending =

Studio album by Sinister
- Released: 28 September 2012
- Recorded: Soundlodge studios in Rhauderfehn, Germany
- Genre: Death metal
- Length: 48:07
- Label: Massacre
- Producer: Jörg Uken

Sinister chronology
Legacy of Ashes (2010)	The Carnage Ending (2012)	The Post-Apocalyptic Servant (2014)

Professional ratings
Review scores
Source	Rating
AllMusic	3.5/5 stars
Last Rites	(7/10)

The Carnage Ending (2012) is a tenth studio album by Dutch death metal band Sinister. It was released on 28 September 2012 through Massacre Records.

== Track listing ==
No.	Title	Length
1.	"Gates of Bloodshed"	1:22
2.	"Unheavenly Domain"	3:26
3.	"Transylvania (City of the Damned)"	5:12
4.	"My Casual Enemy"	5:01
5.	"Crown of Thorns"	5:17
6.	"The Carnage Ending"	5:26
7.	"Oath of Rebirth"	4:06
8.	"Regarding the Imagery"	3:41
9.	"Blood Ecstacy"	4:33
10.	"Defamatory Content"	4:41
11.	"Final Destroyer"	5:22
Total length:		48:07

Digipak Edition bonus tracks
No.	Title	Length
12.	"Spit On Your Grave" (Whiplash cover)	2:38
13.	"Succubus" (Massacre cover)	3:05
14.	"Swing of the Axe" (Possessed cover)	4:04
15.	"Dethroned Emperor" (Celtic Frost cover)	4:35
16.	"Face Fate" (Bloodfeast cover)	3:24

== Personnel ==
Sinister

- Aad Kloosterwaard - vocals
- Mathijs Brussaard - bass
- Dennis Hartog - bass, guitars
- Toep Duin - drums
- Bastiaan Brussaard - guitars

Production

- Jörg Uken - producer
- Mike Hrubrovcak - cover art
