= Cloaked by Ages, Crowned in Earth =

Studio album by Morgion
- Released: 2004
- Genre: Doom metal
- Length: 61:32
- Label: Dark Symphonies

Morgion chronology
Solinari (1999)	Cloaked by Ages, Crowned in Earth (2004)

Cloaked by Ages, Crowned in Earth is the third and last album by the American doom metal band Morgion. It was released in 2004 by Dark Symphonies.

== Track listing ==
1. "Cloaked by Ages" (1:22)
2. "A Slow Succumbing" (Music: Griffith/Boardman, Lyrics: Davis) (9:47)
3. "Ebb Tide (Parts I & II)" (Music: Griffith, Lyrics: Davis) (13:04)
4. "Trillium Rune" (Music: Boardman) (3:37)
5. "The Mourner's Oak" (Music: Griffith, Lyrics: Davis) (6:06)
6. "Cairn" (Music: Boardman/Griffith/Christian, Lyrics: Davis) (6:46)
7. "She, The Master Covets" (Music: Griffith, Lyrics: Davis) (5:22)
8. "Crowned In Earth/Lull (Hidden Track)" (Music: Griffith, Lyrics: Davis) (15:25)
