= One Lie Fits All =

Studio album by One Minute Silence
- Released: 7 July 2003
- Genre: Nu metal
- Length: 51:33
- Label: Taste Records
- Producer: John Leckie

One Minute Silence chronology
Buy Now... Saved Later (2000)	One Lie Fits All (2003)

Professional ratings
Review scores
Source	Rating
musicOMH	(positive) link

One Lie Fits All is the third studio album by Irish metal band One Minute Silence, released on 7 July 2003. Produced by John Leckie, it was the band's last album before they announced their break-up in October 2003, and never enjoyed a supporting tour unlike the two EPs (Revolution and We Bounce) that were released during the anticipation for the album.

MusicOMH wrote that the album's production style ranked with the best nu metal albums, but that the songs included some weaker material.

== Performance ==
The album gave One Minute Silence their highest-charting single to date with "I Wear My Skin" reaching number 44 in the UK charts.

== Track listing ==
No.	Title	Length
1.	"Fistful of Nothing"	3:34
2.	"Revolution"	3:19
3.	"I Wear My Skin"	3:28
4.	"The Way Back"	4:46
5.	"We Bounce"	3:57
6.	"You So Much as Move"	5:06
7.	"Price of the Kings Ticket"	6:09
8.	"Into Our Own"	4:01
9.	"A Song About"	4:36
10.	"The Hill Is a Hole"	4:43
11.	"Representing the Poor Man"	7:54
Total length:		51:33

Japanese edition bonus track
No.	Title	Length
12.	"Black Flag"	4:45
