= Judgement of Tormented Souls =

Studio album by Dominia
- Released: December 2008
- Genre: Melodic death metal Symphonic black metal
- Length: 50:31
- Label: Fono Ltd.

Dominia chronology
Divine Revolution (2006)	Judgement of Tormented Souls (2008)

Judgement of Tormented Souls is the second studio album by Russian metal band Dominia.

Janne Saksa produced and mixed the album.

== Track listing ==
No.	Title	Length
1.	"Prelude"	3:21
2.	"Judgement"	5:37
3.	"Behind the Universe"	6:43
4.	"Harvester"	3:29
5.	"Angels' Suicide"	6:56
6.	"Inside of Me"	4:52
7.	"Exodus"	6:52
8.	"Rosemary's Child"	4:38
9.	"The Beginning"	8:01
10.	"In Black (Bonus Track)"	7:29

== Personnel ==
- Anton Rosa − vocals
- Casper – violin, keyboards
- Daniel – guitar
- Papa − drums
- Alexander Goodwin – bass
