= Divine Revolution =

Studio album by Dominia
- Released: 11 October 2006
- Genre: Melodic death metal
- Length: 47:13
- Label: UHO Production

Dominia chronology
Divine Revolution (Demo) (2006)	Divine Revolution (2006)	Judgement of Tormented Souls (2008)

Divine Revolution is the first studio album by Russian metal band Dominia.

== Track listing ==
No.	Title	Length
1.	"The Prophecy"	7:02
2.	"With Pain into Eternity"	5:51
3.	"Burial of Reasons"	5:56
4.	"The Darkness of Bright Life"	4:12
5.	"God Is A Brand"	4:02
6.	"Beautiful Innocence"	3:15
7.	"Save Yourself"	4:12
8.	"The Punishment"	3:02
9.	"Mountains of God's Depression"	9:34

== Personnel ==
- Anton Rosa − vocals
- Casper – violin, keyboards
- Kat − violin
- Daniel – guitar
- Papa − drums
- Alexander Goodwin – bass

== Sources ==
- Review by Rock Hard
