= Legacy of Ashes (album) =

Studio album by Sinister
- Released: 17 December 2010
- Recorded: Soundlodge studios in Rhauderfehn, Germany
- Genre: Death metal
- Length: 37:45
- Label: Massacre
- Producer: Jörg Uken

Sinister chronology
The Silent Howling (2008)	Legacy of Ashes (2010)	The Carnage Ending (2012)

Professional ratings
Review scores
Source	Rating
AllMusic	4/5 stars

Legacy of Ashes is the ninth studio album by Dutch death metal band Sinister. It was released on 17 December 2010 through Massacre Records.

== Track listing ==
No.	Title	Length
1.	"Herd of Damnation"	1:27
2.	"Into the Blind World"	4:34
3.	"The Enemy of My Enemy"	4:08
4.	"Anatomy of a Catastrophe"	4:05
5.	"The Sin of Sodomy"	3:31
6.	"Legacy of Ashes"	4:24
7.	"The Hornet's Nest"	4:44
8.	"Righteous Indignations"	4:32
9.	"The Living Sacrifice"	6:20
Total length:		37:45

Limited Digipak Edition bonus tracks
No.	Title	Length
10.	"The Grey Massacre"	4:13
11.	"Afterburner"	4:59
12.	"Altruistic Suicide"	5:07
13.	"Men Down"	6:02

== Personnel ==
Sinister

- Aad Kloosterwaard - Vocals
- Alex Paul - Guitars, Bass
- Edwin van den Eeden - Drums

Production

- Mike Hrubovcak - Cover art
- Jörg Uken - Producer
