= Salmon (band) =

- Origin: Gilroy, California, USA
- Genres: Rap metal, rap rock, funk metal
- Years active: 1994-2012
- Labels: Entropy, Red Ant

Salmon was an American rap metal band that formed in 1994 in Gilroy, California. After relocating to San Jose, they signed to Red Ant Records, who released their second album Paco... Drop the Chicken (1997). They departed Red Ant later in 1997, and entered a semi-permanent hiatus, only playing sporadic shows during the following years.

== History ==
The band had its roots in the early 1990s Bay Area funk metal scene, which also included artists such as Limbomaniacs, Primus and Psychefunkapus. Before Salmon formed, vocalist Lawrence Martinez and drummer Pat Ruiz played together in a short-lived funk group called Dutch Courage. The band were described as having a "goofball" sound. After Dutch Courage split, they formed "Groovalistic Salmon" with guitarist Aaron Goodwin and bass player Tom Walker, sticking firmly to the funk sound of Dutch Courage. They soon dropped "Groovalistic" from their name, and one of the first compositions they wrote under the Salmon moniker was a rap metal song about The Flintstones. The song became a favorite at shows, and fans asked them to write more songs like the Flintstones song, which they did. They developed a dedicated following in rural cities near the Bay Area, including Gilroy and Morgan Hill. Once relocating to San Jose, Salmon became one of the most popular local acts in that area. They won the Cactus Jam Night competition, played the main stage at the 1994 SoFA Street Fair and landed gigs at the historic Fillmore in San Francisco. Their first recording was a demo tape titled Gracias Mijo, which regularly sold out at local record stores. Some of the artists they performed with in the mid-1990s include 311, Deftones, Korn, No Doubt, Papa Roach, Sublime and Suicidal Tendencies. Their first full-length album Flourished with Candies was released in 1995, through San Francisco label Entropy. Following the release of Flourished with Candies, their manager Gary Avila helped them sign with the recently formed national label Red Ant. The Los Angeles-based label was founded in July 1996 by Al Teller, formerly of MCA Records, and had more than $100 million in financing via Wasserstein Perella, an investment bank. They were mainly focusing on alternative and urban music, having also signed acts such as Cheap Trick, My Life with the Thrill Kill Kult and Slo Burn. Red Ant released Salmon's second album Paco... Drop the Chicken on February 12, 1997, and at the time, the band said that the album title was meant to be humorous and didn't have a specific meaning.

Two months after the release of Paco... Drop the Chicken, Red Ant withdrew tour support for Salmon. Avila claimed this was due to internal issues the label was facing. Teller had recently sold Red Ant to Alliance Entertainment, which itself was another company being funded by Wasserstein Perella. In July 1997, Alliance filed for bankruptcy, having debts of over $200 million. The band departed Red Ant shortly after their tour support was dropped, and on August 27, 1997, they played what they said would be their last show. This show occurred at the Cactus Club in San Jose. Salmon eventually reunited in 1999, citing the bond between the band members, and continued to play sporadic local shows into the 2000s. Their last known performances were in 2012, with these being their first shows in over five years.

== Musical style and influences ==
In a 1997 interview, the band said some of their influences were Faith No More and Primus. Goodwin mentioned Primus guitarist Larry LaLonde as being an influence on his playing, in addition to also being inspired by jazz and experimental music. Martinez cited older 1980s hip hop as a vocal influence, along with more contemporary hip hop. The Metro Silicon Valley believed that Martinez derived influence from Primus singer Les Claypool, and claimed that the band had a "much goofier" and "more eclectic" sound than other bands that were fusing metal and rap, such as 311, Korn and Rage Against the Machine. In 1999, they reflected that the band's sound had been more innovative three years prior, when the fusion of metal and rap was less common among Bay Area bands. In an earlier 1996 article, they wrote that Flourished with Candies displayed a "skillful navigation" of rap and rock, adding that "[it's] an upstream battle that has daunted many bands. Rockers who want to be rappers (Red Hot Chili Peppers' Anthony Kiedis) and rappers who want to be rockers (Ice-T) often cancel each genre out, rarely garnering praise from either faction."

== Members ==
- Lawrence Martinez - Vocals (1994 - 2012)
- Aaron Goodwin - Guitar (1994 - 2012)
- Tom Walker - Bass (1994 - 2012)
- Pat Ruiz - Drums (1994 - 2012)

== Discography ==
- Flourished with Candies (1995)
- Paco... Drop the Chicken (1997)
