= Hipnosis (Shootyz Groove album) =

Studio album by Shootyz Groove
- Released: June 24, 1997
- Genre: Rap rock, funk metal
- Length: 51:49
- Label: Roadrunner
- Producer: Shootyz Groove

Shootyz Groove chronology
Jammin' In Vicious Environments (1994)	Hipnosis (1997)	High Definition (1999)

Hipnosis is the second studio album by American rap rock/funk metal band Shootyz Groove. It was released on June 24, 1997 by Roadrunner Records.

== Background ==
After their 1994 album Jammin' In Vicious Environments failed to attract mainstream attention, Shootyz Groove departed the major label Mercury Records for the-then independently run metal label Roadrunner Records. Following the release of Hipnosis in mid-1997, Shootyz Groove again switched labels, moving to the major label Reprise Records, who would release their third studio album in 1999.

== Reception ==
Professional ratings
Review scores
Source	Rating
AllMusic	4/5 stars
NME	5/10

Stephen Thomas Erlewine of AllMusic gave Hipnosis a positive four-star review. He states that "After releasing two albums to no success on Mercury, Shootyz Groove moved to Roadrunner for Hipnosis. Ironically, the group turned in their best, most focused effort to date on the indie label. " Erlewine characterized the album as "Tempering the heavy metal influences that underpinned their previous two albums with punk, ska, rap and funk." Writing in the NME, Johnny Cigarettes said that "we've heard these beats and rhymes before. There's few ideas on show here beyond a guitar going wah wah and chug chug and generic rapping."

== Track listing ==
No.	Title	Length
1.	"Regardless"	3:29
2.	"Manhole"	3:20
3.	"Lillypad"	3:32
4.	"Once"	4:40
5.	"Interzone"	3:47
6.	"Anchor"	3:44
7.	"Fantasy #5"	4:09
8.	"Triangle Music"	0:48
9.	"Groovyland"	3:34
10.	"Nothing for You"	3:55
11.	"Diamond Mind"	3:16
12.	"Other Side"	4:32
13.	"Reverse Side"	3:32
14.	"8,000,000 Times"	5:31
Total length:		51:49
