= Barbed Wire Soul =

Studio album by Blackstar
- Released: 9 June 1998
- Recorded: Parr Street Studios, March 1997
- Genre: Heavy metal; groove metal
- Length: 43:28
- Label: Prosthetic
- Producer: Colin Richardson

Barbed Wire Soul is the only studio album by English rock band Blackstar, released on 9 June 1998 by Prosthetic Records. In the United States, the band was credited as Blackstar Rising.

== Track listing ==
| No. | Title | Length |
|---|---|---|
| 1. | "Game Over" | 04:04 |
| 2. | "Smile" | 03:39 |
| 3. | "Sound of Silence" | 03:46 |
| 4. | "Rock 'n' Roll Circus" | 04:14 |
| 5. | "New Song" | 03:55 |
| 6. | "Give Up The Ghost" | 03:08 |
| 7. | "Revolution of The Heart" | 04:02 |
| 8. | "Waste of Space" | 03:49 |
| 9. | "Deep Wound" | 03:10 |
| 10. | "Better the Devil" | 04:41 |
| 11. | "Instrumental" | 05:00 |
| Total length: | | 43:28 |

Japanese edition bonus tracks
| No. | Title | Length |
|---|---|---|
| 12. | "The Girl Who Lives on Heaven Hill" (Hüsker Dü cover) | 02:47 |
| 13. | "Running Back" (Thin Lizzy cover) | 03:09 |
| 14. | "Peace Dog" (The Cult cover) | 03:37 |
| 15. | "Revolution of The Heart" | 04:23 |
| 16. | "New Song" | 03:50 |
| 17. | "Don't Want to Talk Anymore" | 03:42 |
| 18. | "Waste of Space" | 03:49 |
| 19. | "Instrumental" | 04:54 |
| Total length: | | 73:39 |

- Bonus tracks 15–19 are demo versions.

== Personnel ==
- Ken Owen – drums, vocals
- Jeffrey Walker – vocals, bass
- Carlo Regadas – guitars
- Mark Griffiths – guitars

=== Additional personnel ===
- Colin Richardson – laughter on "Smile", producer
- Dave Buchanan – tambourine, cowbell
- Martin Smith – bass on "Waste of Space"
- Jenny Lamb – saxophone on "Rock 'n' Roll Circus" and "Waste of Space"
- Harald Hoffmann – photography
- Dirk Rudolph – design, photography
- Ian Anderson – mastering
- Ewan "Bed'Ed" Davies – engineering
- Dave "Da Duke" Buchanan – engineering
- Ian T. Tilton – photography
