= Face Down (album) =

Studio album by Serial Joe
- Released: June 6, 1999
- Studio: Metalworks Studios (Mississauga, Ontario, Canada)
- Genre: Nu metal; alternative metal; alternative rock
- Length: 37:48
- Label: Aquarius
- Producer: Dave Ogilvie

Serial Joe chronology
Kicked (1998)	Face Down (1999)	Serial Joe (2000)

Face Down is the debut studio album by Canadian rock band Serial Joe. The album features the hit single "Mistake", which was featured on MuchMusic's Big Shiny Tunes 4. The album was certified Gold on September 3, 1999.

== Track listing ==
1. "Should Have Been Mine" - 3:24
2. "Deep" - 3:08
3. "Mistake" - 3:08
4. "Face Down" - 3:38
5. "Dragon On My Shoulder" - 2:51
6. "Shallow" - 3:22
7. "Push" - 2:47
8. "Sanity" - 2:55
9. "Centipede" - 3:13
10. "Confused" - 3:22
11. "Outrage" - 3:02
12. "Denial" - 2:52
