= Uncle Slam =

American crossover thrash band

- Origin: Los Angeles, California, U.S.
- Genres: Crossover thrash, thrash metal
- Years active: 1987–1995
- Labels: Caroline, Restless, Medusa
- Spinoff of: The Brood, Suicidal Tendencies
- Past members: Todd Moyer; Simon Oliver; R. J. Herrera; Jon Nelson; John Flitcraft; Louiche Mayorga; Bob Heathcote; Angelo Espino; Amery Smith

Uncle Slam was an American crossover thrash band from Los Angeles, California, formed in 1987, which shared some members with Suicidal Tendencies. Many of their songs were about politics, rebel themes, death, pain, and violence.

== History ==
Uncle Slam was formed as offshoot of a previous band called The Brood in 1987, by singer/guitarist Jon Nelson, singer/guitarist Todd Moyer, bassist John Flitcraft, and former Suicidal Tendencies drummer Amery Smith. Flitcraft was replaced by Louiche Mayorga, another former member of Suicidal Tendencies. Another bassist for Uncle Slam, Bob Heathcote, later joined Suicidal Tendencies.

Their first album, Say Uncle, was released in 1988 by Caroline Records. Despite the band having no relation to slamming death metal, the lead track for this album, "Weirdo Man" uses a guitar riff in the beginning very similar to the slam riff. Notably this album was released three years before the Suffocation album which is usually cited as the first slam riff.

Numerous personnel changes slowed the production of the band's second album, and Will Work for Food was finally released in 1993 by Restless Records. A performance that year gained the band positive notice from the Chicago Tribune, which called the band an important new practitioner of its genre. Their final album When God Dies was released in 1995 by Medusa Records, after which the band broke up.

== Members ==
Last line-up

- Todd Moyer – lead guitar and backing vocals (1984–1995)
- Simon Oliver – bass (1987–1989, 1991–1995)
- R. J. Herrera – drums (1994–1995)

Former members

- Jon Nelson – lead vocals and lead guitar (1984–1987) †
- John Flitcraft – bass, backing vocals (1984–1986) †
- Louiche Mayorga – bass (1986–1987)
- Bob Heathcote – bass (1987)
- Angelo Espino – bass (1989–1991)
- Amery Smith – drums and backing vocals (1984–1994)

† = Members who were present when Uncle Slam was known as the Brood.

Timeline

== Discography ==
=== Studio albums ===
Year of release	Title	Label
1988	Say Uncle	Caroline Records
1993	Will Work for Food	Restless Records
1995	When God Dies	Medusa Records

=== Demos ===
Year of Release	Title
1987	Say Uncle preproduction demo
1987	Demo '87
1988	Say Uncle
