= Blackstar (band) =

British rock band

- Origin: Liverpool, England
- Genres: Hard rock
- Years active: 1997–1999
- Label: Peaceville Records
- Past members: Jeffrey Walker; Carlo Regadas; Ken Owen; Mark Griffiths

Blackstar were a British hard rock band, formed as a retooling of the band Carcass in 1995 without Bill Steer along with former Cathedral bassist Mark Griffiths (on guitar). The band name comes from a Carcass song off the Swansong 1996 album. Blackstar released only a single album. After a while, the band was forced to change its name to Blackstar Rising. The band dissolved because drummer Ken Owen suffered from a brain haemorrhage.

== Members ==
- Jeff Walker - bass, vocals
- Ken Owen - drums
- Carlos Regadas - lead guitar
- Mark Griffiths - rhythm guitar

== Discography ==
=== Promo 96 ===
1. Revolution of the Heart
2. New Song
3. Rock 'n' Roll Circus
4. Don't Want to Talk Anymore
5. Better the Devil
6. Waste of Space
7. Instrumental

=== Barbed Wire Soul (1998 Peaceville Records) ===
Japanese versions has 5 demo tracks and 3 cover versions as bonus tracks

1. Game Over 4:02
2. Smile 3:37
3. Sound of Silence 3:44
4. Rock 'n' Roll Circus 4:14
5. New Song 3:54
6. Give Up the Ghost 3:07
7. Revolution of the Heart 4:02
8. Waste of Space 3:50
9. Deep Wound 3:09
10. Better the Devil 4:40
11. Instrumental 5:00

(The end of the song Instrumental is a quote from the movie From Dusk till Dawn)

=== X (1998 CD VILE77) ===
Digipack 10 year anniversary release with cover tracks by Peaceville artists X cover

1. Anathema - "One Of The Few" (Pink Floyd)
2. Dominion - "Shout" (Tears For Fears)
3. My Dying Bride - "Some Velvet Morning" (Nancy Sinatra/Lee Hazlewood)
4. My Dying Bride - "Roads" (Portishead)
5. Anathema - "Better Off Dead" (Bad Religion)
6. Thine - "Song Of Joy" (Nick Cave)
7. Blackstar - "The Girl Who Lives On Heaven Hill" (Hüsker Dü)
8. Acrimony - "O Baby" (Status Quo)
9. The Blood Divine - "Crazy Horses" (The Osmonds)
10. The Blood Divine - "Love Will Tear Us Apart" (Joy Division)
11. Dominion - "Paint It Black" (Rolling Stones)
12. Blackstar - "Running Back" (Thin Lizzy)
13. Lid - "Don't Let Me Down" (The Beatles)
14. Anathema - "Goodbye Cruel World" (Pink Floyd)
