= Dominia (band) =

Russian band

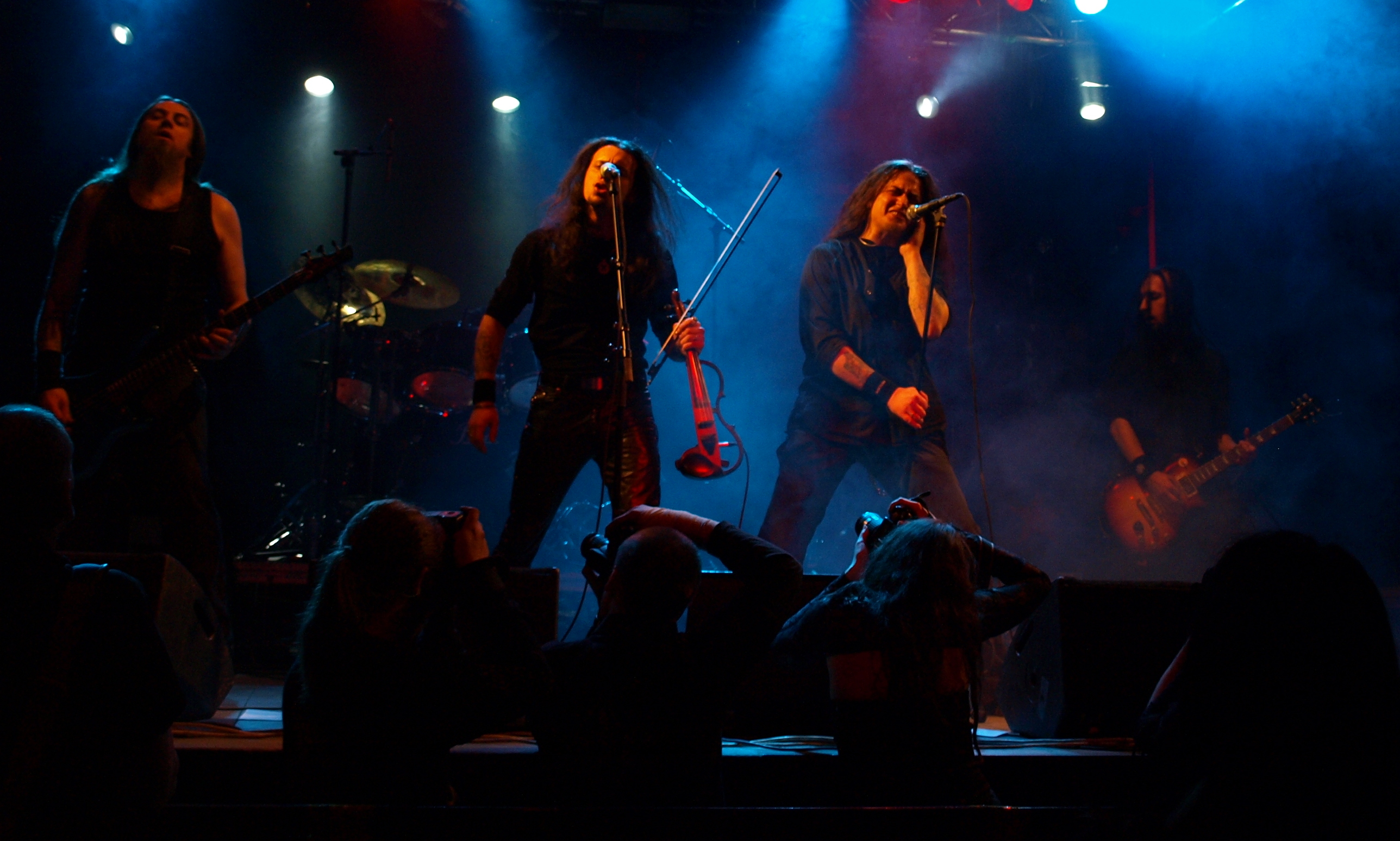
- Russian Doom Metal band Dominia live at Nosturi, Helsinki (2008)

Background information
- Origin: Saint Petersburg, Russia
- Genres: Doom metal; symphonic black metal; melodic death metal; gothic metal
- Years active: 1999–present
- Label: Mourning Star Heathens Music Group
- Members: Anton Rosa (vocals & bass); Denis "Daniel" Sukharev (guitar); Oleg "Papa" Philistovich (drums); Mikhail Morozkin (violin)
- Past members: Kat; Alexander Goodwin; Ilya "Pin" Kononov; Pavel Lohnin; Dmitry Rishko; Pavel Mosin

Dominia is a Russian doom metal band formed in Saint Petersburg in 1999.

== Members ==
=== Current members ===
- Anton Rosa – vocals, bass
- Denis "Daniel" Sukharev – guitar
- Oleg"Papa" Philistovich – drums
- Mikhail Morozkin – violin

=== Former members ===
- Kat – violin
- Alexander Goodwin – bass
- Ilya "Pin" Kononov – bass
- Oleg "Papa" Filistovich – drums
- Pavel Lohnin – drums

== Discography ==
=== Full length ===
- 2006 – Divine Revolution
- 2008 – Judgement of Tormented Souls
- 2014 – Theophania
- 2017 – Stabat Mater
- 2020 - The Withering of the Rose
- 2024 – Timeless

=== Demos & singles ===
- 2001 – Dancing with Marie Jane (demo)
- 2002 – Cover Single (single)
- 2003 – Demo (demo),
- 2003 – God's Depression (demo)
- 2003 – Melancholy (demo)
- 2004 – Demo 2 (demo)
- 2005 – Runaway (single)
- 2005 – Divine Revolution (demo)
- 2006 – The Darkness of Bright Life (single)
- 2008 – Exodus (single)
- 2011 – Promo Pack (demo)
- 2013 – Death Only (single)
- 2015 – The Boy and the Priest (single)
- 2015 – Poison (single)
- 2016 – The First and the Last Prayer (single)
- 2022 – Homecoming (single)
