= Among Majestic Ruin =

Studio album by Morgion
- Released: January 28, 1997
- Recorded: Jim Barnes' Audio Productions, July 1994
- Genre: Death/doom
- Length: 34:12
- Label: Relapse
- Producer: Jim Barnes, Morgion

Morgion chronology
Travesty (1993)	Among Majestic Ruin (1997)	Solinari (1999)

Professional ratings
Review scores
Source	Rating
Allmusic	3.5/5 stars
Chronicles of Chaos	(9/10)

Among Majestic Ruin is the debut studio album by the American death/doom band Morgion. It was released on January 28, 1997, through Relapse Records.

== Background ==
Influenced by bands such as Entombed, Autopsy, Morbid Angel and Paradise Lost, Orange County's Morgion was formed in 1990 by Jeremy Peto (vocals/bass), Dwayne Boardman (guitars/vocals), and Rhett Davis (drums).

After a year of rehearsal, the band entered at Jim Dotson's studio, South Coast Recording Studio (Jim is currently the owner of Muskrat Ranch, LLC in Orlando, Florida) to record the Rabid Decay demo in 1992. Morgion recorded two tracks for a 7-inch release, Travesty, which was released on the independent record label Catatonic in 1993.

In 1994, guitarist Bobby Thomas and keyboardist Ed Parker joined the band. With this formation Morgion found its identity it so longed for, "building on existing fundamentals by incorporating intricate melodies and atmospherics" Morgion recorded nearly an hour of material at Jim Barnes' Audio Productions in July 1994, and from these sessions the "Among Majestic Ruin" EP and two Celtic Frost cover songs for "In Memory of Celtic Frost" were born.

The group managed to sign a licensing contract with Relapse Records, and three years after those recording sessions, Among Majestic Ruin was released.

== Track listing ==
All songs were written by Dwayne Boardman, Rhett Davis, Eddie Parker, Jeremy Peto, and Bobby Thomas.

1. "Relic of a Darkened Past" – 8:25
2. "In Ashen Tears (Thus I Cry)" – 8:14
3. "Travesty" – 5:07
4. "Basking under a Blacksun Dawning" – 5:39
5. "Invalid Prodigy" – 6:47
