= Paco... Drop the Chicken =

Studio album by Salmon
- Released: February 11, 1997
- Genre: Rap metal, rap rock, funk metal
- Label: Red Ant Records

Salmon chronology
| Flourished with Candies (1995) | Paco... Drop the Chicken (1997) |

Paco... Drop the Chicken is the second and final album by American rap metal band Salmon, and their first through the recently formed Red Ant Records. Shortly after it was released by Red Ant in February 1997, the label faced financial issues and the band entered hiatus.

== Background ==
Following their formation in 1994, Salmon built up a strong local following in San Jose and the Bay Area. They became one of the most popular live acts in this area and performed alongside artists such as 311, Deftones, Korn, No Doubt, Papa Roach, Sublime and Suicidal Tendencies. Their success in Northern California led to them signing with Los Angeles-based Red Ant Records. The label was formed in July 1996 by Al Teller, formerly of MCA Records. Red Ant had more than $100 million in financing behind it, via investment bank Wasserstein Perella, and in the first half of 1997 it released albums by veteran acts Cheap Trick and My Life with the Thrill Kill Kult. Red Ant would release Paco... Drop the Chicken on February 11, 1997, but withdrew tour support just two months later. This was since their parent company Alliance Entertainment was in financial strife. Alliance was also connected to Wasserstein Perella and eventually filed for bankruptcy in July 1997, with debts of over $200 million. The following month in San Jose, Salmon played what they said would be their final show. However, they eventually reunited for more shows in 1999, and continued to sporadically play shows during the following years, although they did not record any new music.

== Musical style and lyrics ==
Prior to forming, the members of Salmon had been involved in the early 1990s Bay Area funk metal scene, which included acts such as Limbomaniacs, Primus and Psychefunkapus. Vocalist Lawrence Martinez and drummer Pat Ruiz originally played in Dutch Courage, who were described as a funk band with a "goofball" sound. When Salmon formed, they were initially playing under the name ""Groovalistic Salmon", and stuck to the funk style, before gradually evolving their music. In 1997, they mentioned bands such as Faith No More and Primus as influences, in addition to also being influenced by hip hop, jazz and experimental music. Paco... Drop the Chicken has been described as having elements of metal, hip hop and funk. According to the Metro Silicon Valley in 2012, Salmon had a "goofier" and more "eclectic" sound than other bands that were fusing metal and rap at that time, such as 311 and Rage Against the Machine. They also considered Salmon to be part of the mid-1990s "rap metal era", before the nu metal movement became popular.

Many of the tracks were re-recorded from their prior independent album Flourished with Candies (1995), which was released by San Francisco label Entropy. That album itself also consisted of songs which originated from their initial demo tape Gracias Mijo. The song "Voltron" references the Japanese animated series of the same name. In their early days, the band made similar pop culture references in their music with a song about The Flintstones. The song had a rap metal sound, and was popular with audiences, leading them to focus more on that sound rather than their earlier funk sound.

The closing track "Punk Like Me" ends at 2 minutes and 43 seconds, and at 7 minutes, a hidden track starts playing, where the band do prank calls on a man working at a bird shop, and a woman working at a restaurant.

=== Title ===
The band came up with the title Paco... Drop the Chicken while they were in the living room of drummer Pat Ruiz. In a 1997 interview, they said that the title was meant to be humorous and didn't have a specific meaning. In another interview, they also noted that the term "chicken" used to be a synonym for certain substances, but that it usually didn't mean that anymore.

== Track listing ==
| No. | Title | Length |
|---|---|---|
| 1. | "Q" | 2:48 |
| 2. | "Star Flakes" | 2:59 |
| 3. | "Voltron" | 2:53 |
| 4. | "Bantamburgh" | 3:36 |
| 5. | "Pedastool Break" | 2:59 |
| 6. | "Rubberhead" | 5:01 |
| 7. | "7" | 4:17 |
| 8. | "Falling, Giving, Being" | 2:47 |
| 9. | "The Krack" | 4:15 |
| 10. | "Do Me" | 2:42 |
| 11. | "Punk Like Me" | 11:50 |

== Personnel ==
=== Salmon ===
- Lawrence Martinez - Vocals
- Aaron Goodwin - Guitar
- Tom Walker - Bass
- Pat Ruiz - Drums
