= I Shalt Become =

- Origin: Illinois, United States
- Genres: Black metal, atmospheric black metal, symphonic black metal
- Years active: 1995–present
- Labels: Moribund Cult; No Colours; Darker Than Black; Merchant of Death
- Members: S. Holliman, A. J. Scherer

I Shalt Become is a black metal musical project of Mainman S. Holliman formed in the United States in 1995. Before the project disbanded in 1999, S. Holliman recorded two official demos: Wanderings in 1998 and In the Falling Snow in 1999. In the same year, the In the Falling Snow demo was released as a bootleg under the name Birkenau. In 2008 In the Falling Snow has been remastered and reissued as an I Shalt Become record, and the project has become active again.

The band belongs to the atmospheric–depressive subgenre of black metal. The lyrical themes deal with abstract concepts and subjects such as desolation and emptiness.

== Members ==
- S. Holliman – vocals, guitar, bass (1995–present)
- A. J. Scherer – drums (2010–present)

== Discography ==
=== Full albums ===
- 1998 – Wanderings (self-released audio cassette)
- 2006 – Wanderings (re-released on CD at Moribund Records)
- 2008 – In the Falling Snow (CD and LP, No Colours Records)
- 2008 – Requiem (CD, Darker Than Black and Moribund Records)
- 2009 – The Pendle Witch Trials (CD, No Colours Records)
- 2010 – Poison
- 2013 – Louisiana Voodoo

=== Appears on ===
- 2007 – Moribund "Death Cult" Vol No. 1 CD (with the song "Funeral Rain")
