= Beyond the Bridge =

German rock band

- Origin: Frankfurt, Germany
- Genres: Progressive metal Progressive rock
- Years active: 1999–2013
- Labels: Frontiers Records
- Members: Dilenya Mar; Herbie Langhans; Peter Degenfeld; Christopher Tarnow; Dominik Stotzem; Fabian Maier
- Website: http://www.beyondthebridge.net/

Beyond the Bridge is a German progressive metal and progressive rock band, formed as Fall Out in Frankfurt, in 1999.

== Background ==
The band was formed as Fall Out in Frankfurt am Main in Germany as a school band by guitar player Peter Degenfeld-Schonburg and bass player Dominik Stotzem. In 2008 and after several breaks the band started to experiment for a concept studio album and has been renamed to 'Beyond the Bridge'. In 2012 the band released its first album 'The Old Man and the Spirit' with producer Simon Oberender and Frontiers Records. Shortly after release of the album, producer and main contributor to the album's release Simon Oberender, suddenly died.

== Band members ==
- Dilenya Mar - vocals
- Herbie Langhans - vocals
- Peter Degenfeld - guitar
- Christopher Tarnow - keyboards
- Dominik Stotzem - bass
- Fabian Maier - drums

== Discography ==
- The Old Man and the Spirit (album, 2012, Frontiers Records)
