= High Definition (Shootyz Groove album) =

Studio album by Shootyz Groove
- Released: May 28, 1999
- Genre: Rap rock
- Label: Kinetic/Reprise; 47359
- Producer: David Kahne

Shootyz Groove chronology
Hipnosis (1997)	High Definition (1999)	ONE (2007)

Professional ratings
Review scores
Source	Rating
AllMusic	4/5 stars
The Independent	4/5 stars

High Definition is an album by the Bronx rap rock group Shootyz Groove, released in 1999. It contains the songs "L Train" and "Blow Your Top".

== Critical reception ==
The Telegram & Gazette wrote that the band "offers a more mature batch of songs on its latest effort without sacrificing any of its high energy attack or its positive attitude along the way." Tulsa World praised the "left-field cover of XTC's "Dear God" that telescopes Andy Partridge's original vision of self-determination into a full-fledged, freestyling sermon."

AllMusic wrote that "it's a guitar jamboree: 'L Train' glides along crisp reggae tracks, while 'You Have All Been Warned' and 'Put Down The Mics' (whose message seems long overdue) boil over with furious fuzz-tones."

== Track listing ==
1. "Mad for It"
2. "Young City Boys and Girls"
3. "L Train"
4. "Faithful"
5. "So Much Time"
6. "Dear God (Oh My God)"
7. "Blow Your Top"
8. "NYC Minute"
9. "Put Down the Mics"
10. "You Have All Been Warned"
11. "Easily"
