= One Good Turn Deserves Another =

Studio album by Slaves on Dope
- Released: 1997
- Studios: Studio Victor, Montreal, Quebec
- Genre: Nu metal
- Length: 46:28
- Label: Just a Minute
- Producer: Glen Robinson

Slaves on Dope chronology
Sober (1994)	One Good Turn Deserves Another (1997)	Klepto (1999)

Singles from One Good Turn Deserves Another
- 1. "Light on your Feet" Released: 1997; 2. "I'll Never Feel" Released: 1997

One Good Turn Deserves Another is the debut album by the Canadian band Slaves on Dope. It was released only in Canada during 1997, through Just a Minute Records.

== Background and music ==
Slaves on Dope had previously released an independent demo in 1994 titled Sober which managed to sell 5,000 copies. The band then went on to tour Canada five times after its release, and created enough of a buzz to eventually start playing shows in the United States. On the back of this, they signed in 1997 to Just a Minute Records, a subsidiary of Montreal jazz label Justin Time Records. The two labels were founded by Jim West, and in 1997 Just a Minute was described as being dedicated to "hip, new alternative-flavored rock". Slaves on Dope were the first band signed to the label, and One Good Turn Deserves Another was its first official release. It was produced by Glen Robinson, known for his work with popular Canadian band The Tea Party. According to a June 9, 1997 article by The Montreal Gazette, the album was going to be launched on June 17, 1997. However, in subsequent years others have listed it as being released a month earlier. In 2016, Justin Time re-released it to digital platforms such as Apple Music.

The album had a more melodic sound than their major label debut, 2000's Inches from the Mainline, utilizing almost no screaming-style vocals like on that release. In a 2003 interview shortly after the release of their next album Metafour, vocalist Jason Rockman claimed that it was a return to the sound of One Good Turn Deserves Another. He said, "if you listen to some of our older independent stuff, like One Good Turn Deserves Another, that stuff is all over the place. We really tried to get back to that [with Metafour]. We're really influenced by bands like Faith No More. They just did whatever songs they wanted to do. They had the attitude of not trying to be the heaviest band or the most melodic band, they just wrote. I love that attitude."

To promote One Good Turn Deserves Another, music videos were shot in Montreal for the singles "I'll Never Feel" and "Light on Your Feet". During the fall of 1997, the singles also received airplay on Canadian station CHUO-FM and Virginia station WMWC. Regarding "Light on your Feet", Rockman told Metal Sludge in November 2001 "it was a song that the record company wanted released and they were only going to push that song. We all like the song but it may be too 'mellow' for some of our fans."

== Reception ==
In his August 1997 review, Kevin Siu of Canadian publication The McGill Daily Culture wrote, "If techno a la The Prodigy/Chemical Brothers is indeed 1997's rock 'n' roll Zeitgeist, then Beaconsfield's Slaves On Dope are an endangered species. Veteran practitioners of the loud/soft/loud model of angst-rock theory (and its doppleganger strain, the soft/loud/soft model), Slaves On Dope are the local contingent to HMV's stagnant Alternative bins. And, given the flurry of 'alternative' rock signings during the past few years, it's surprising that the band isn't on a major." Siu added, "Slaves On Dope should discover turntables and a thesaurus, a little more inventedtiveness would be welcome. Ultimately, One Good Turn Deserves Another isn't terrible. And it isn't terribly interesting, either."

== Track listing ==
One Good Turn Deserves Another track listing
No.	Title	Length
1.	"I'll Never Feel"	5:18
2.	"Stress"	4:36
3.	"Light on Your Feet"	4:00
4.	"John Wayne"	4:33
5.	"Favorite Friend"	4:23
6.	"Down For This"	4:16
7.	"All You Ever Want"	3:41
8.	"Porno Buddy"	3:24
9.	"Prom Queen"	4:45
10.	"Recognize"	4:58
11.	"Can You Taste It?"	2:34
