= Candy Toy Guns and Television =

Candy Toy Guns and television

Studio album by 20 Dead Flower Children
- Released: June 24, 1997
- Recorded: Overture Recording, Novi, Michigan
- Genre: Industrial metal, nu metal, rap metal, alternative metal
- Length: 38:12
- Label: Overcore Records (1997); TVT Records (2000)
- Producer: Jade Scott

20 Dead Flower Children chronology
20 Dead Flower Children (1996)	Candy Toy Guns and television (1997)

Candy Toy Guns and Television is the second and final studio album by American metal band 20 Dead Flower Children. It was originally released on June 24, 1997 by rapper Esham's label Overcore Records. On October 31, 2000, it was reissued by TVT Records. The original 1997 artwork, featuring a woman painted in bronze holding a gun to her mouth, was kept for TVT's reissue.

== Reception ==
Professional ratings
Review scores
Source	Rating
AllMusic	1.5/5 stars

A positive review of the album was written in the Gavin Report in June 1997, the review states that "[the record] will appeal to those who embrace fast-paced hard rock — it's a great listen." Erik Hage of AllMusic gave the album a negative one-and-a-half-star review, stating "20 Dead Flower Children's Candy, Toy Guns & Television is a rather uninspired, hard-edged foray into industrial/techno, with vocals that swing from Limp Bizkit-flavored rhyming to hardcore roaring." He also observed "This is an idiom that groups such as Linkin Park would subsequently navigate much more successfully (and parlay into financial success)."

== Track listing ==
No.	Title	Length
1.	"Coma 99"	2:35
2.	"Weak Shall Inherit"	2:51
3.	"Fractured"	3:13
4.	"Tunnel Vision"	2:57
5.	"Soul for Sale"	3:07
6.	"Dyna Drone"	2:59
7.	"Martyrman"	2:35
8.	"Swollen"	4:12
9.	"Breathe"	3:17
10.	"Coping with Nothing"	2:42
11.	"Swarm of Mankind"	2:48
12.	"Untitled"	2:05
13.	"Safety Dance (Men Without Hats cover)"	2:51
Total length:		38:12

== Personnel ==
20 Dead Flower Children

- Jason Garrison – drums
- Justin Starr – bass guitar
- Keith Lowers – guitar/programming
- D-Hauz – vocals
