= Slaves on Dope =

Canadian nu metal band

- Origin: Montreal, Quebec, Canada
- Genres: Nu metal, alternative metal
- Years active: 1993–2004, 2009–present
- Labels: Divine Recordings; Bieler Bros. Records; THC:Music [ILS Group]
- Members: Jason Rockman; Kevin Jardine; Rob Laurion; Peter Tzaferis

Slaves on Dope is a Canadian nu metal band based in Montreal, Quebec.

== History ==
The band was formed in 1993 by Jason Rockman, Kevin Jardine and Avrum Nadigel. The original line-up also included Patrick Francis, and Lenny Vartanian. In 1995, the bass guitarist Francis and the drummer Vartanian were replaced by Frank Salvaggio and Robert Urbani respectively, beginning a new, heavier metal direction for the band.

At that time, the Canadian music scene had yet to embrace nu/alternative metal music, so Salvaggio and Urbani decided to make a six-day trip by Greyhound bus from Montreal to Los Angeles to make contacts and secure showcases for the band. After a year, the band secured a record deal through Ozzy and Sharon Osbourne's Divine Recordings, which released their full-length album, Inches from the Mainline, in 2000.

The band also toured Ozzfest in 2000, and made an appearance on the SnoCore Tour. The album sold approximately 70,000 copies in the US.

After Divine Recordings lost their distribution deal with EMI's Priority Records, the band was left without a label and returned to Montreal. Salvaggio once again returned to Los Angeles with the goal of securing another record deal. With the help of producers Jason Slater and Troy Van Leeuwen, a contract was signed with Bieler Bros. Records. Their second major album, Metafour, was released in 2003.

In March 2004, Rockman, the vocalist, left the band, prompting Slaves on Dope to disband. Salvaggio and Urbani are now part of the band Anew Revolution, with the ex-Ünloco vocalist Joey Duenas. Jardine has become a producer in Montreal (Uplift Recording Studio), as well as forming his own band called The Monarchy (Disbanded).

In 2006, the band's independent release One Good Turn Deserves Another was re-issued through Just A Minute Records. In 2009, Rockman and Jardine reformed Slaves on Dope and the group subsequently recorded their fourth studio album. In an online webisode, the band announced the name of the album to be Over the Influence. It was announced on webisode 18 that the recording had finished with 17 tracks. Rockman then said in a video on the band's Facebook page that the album would be released in spring 2011.

In October 2011, it was announced that Slaves on Dope had signed to THC:Music/Rocket Science Ventures, the new label of the Corporate Punishment Records President, and early Slaves on Dope manager Thom Hazaert, who would release Over the Influence worldwide in spring 2012. They also announced the release of a digital-only EP, Careless Coma, in November 2011.

Slaves On Dope released their fifth studio album, Horse, on September 9, 2016. It features DMC, Bill Kelliher, HR from Bad Brains and Lee Baum from The Damn Truth and their new bass player Rob Laurion.

== Musical style and influences ==
One of the band's main influences is the San Francisco group Faith No More, whom vocalist Jason Rockman labelled as "our heroes". He stated "They were always our benchmark. They were always the band that inspired us. They just did what they wanted to do and they didn't give a flying fuck what people thought. That's how we are." Regarding the band's association with the nu metal genre, Rockman reflected "You know, we've always been a band that has been hard to lump in with anything. A lot of people said, 'you guys were a nu-metal band.' Well, no we were not a nu-metal band. We were just Slaves on Dope and doing what we do. You know, when I was screaming and singing I did it because I heard Burton from Fear Factory doing it and I thought it was cool. But then suddenly it became screamo and emo and metalcore and all these other genres that came after the 2000s, and we just never fit in. And we still don't fit in."

== Members ==
- Jason Rockman – vocals (1994–2004, 2009–present)
- Kevin Jardine – guitar (1994–2004, 2009–present)
- Rob Laurion – bass (2016–present)
- Peter Tzaferis – drums (2009–present)

=== Former ===
- Patrick Francis – bass (1994–1995)
- Lenny Vartanian – drums (1994–1995)
- Frank Salvaggio – bass (1995–2004)
- Rob Urbani – drums (1995–2004)
- Sebastien Ducap – bass (2009–2016)

== Discography ==
Studio albums

- One Good Turn Deserves Another (1997)
- Inches from the Mainline (2000)
- Metafour (2003)
- Over the Influence (2012)
- Horse (2016)

Demos/EPs

- Sober (1993)
- Klepto (1999)
- Careless Coma (2011)
- Covers, Vol. 1 (2013)
- Covers, Vol. 2 (2019)

Other songs

- "War Pigs", Black Sabbath cover, appears on Japanese release of Nativity in Black II: A Tribute to Black Sabbath (2000)
- "Look What The Cat Dragged In", Poison cover, appears on Show Me Your Hits: A Tribute to Poison (2000)
- "Go" (demo) (2002)
- "Drain Me" (demo) (2002)
- "All I Want for Christmas (Is My Two Front Teeth)" (2011)

Music Videos

- "Yourself"
- "I'll Never Feel"
- "Light on Your Feet"
- "Pushing Me (Live at Ozzfest 2000)"
- "Go"
- "No One to Blame"
- "Careless Coma"
- "All I Want for Christmas"
- "Pork Sword"
- "Unraveling"
- "Cavalry"
- "Script Writer"
