= Available in All Colours =

Studio album by One Minute Silence
- Released: 28 April 1998
- Recorded: 1997–1998
- Genre: Rap metal, nu metal, funk metal
- Label: Big Cat

One Minute Silence chronology
Available in All Colours (1998)	Buy Now... Saved Later (2000)

Professional ratings
Review scores
Source	Rating
AllMusic	2.5/5 stars
Pitchfork	2.0/10

Available in All Colours is the debut album of Irish metal band One Minute Silence, released in 1998. It was released on Big Cat Records, and distributed by 3mv/Pinnacle in the UK, Sony Music in France, Rough Trade in Germany and Austria, M.N.W. in Scandinavia, Record Services in Ireland, P.I.A.S in Benelux and Universal in Italy.

It was produced by Machine, and so, although One Minute Silence are a rap metal band, it has a hip hop quality to it.

The album features cover artwork by Anne Stokes (the copyright is owned by Big Cat Records, however) which portrays fetuses in orange and green tubes with the labels "racist", "prophet", "anarchist", "humanitarian", "psychopath", "dictator", etc. It is intended as a comment on the isolation of capitalist society and the categorisation of individuals.

Three songs of Available in All Colours are featured in the 1999 video game Twisted Metal 4; "South Central" is played in the opening cinematic, "A More Violent Approach" serves as the menu music, and "And Some Ya Lose" is used as the sixth level theme (The Oil Rig). All of them are instrumental versions.

== Track listing ==
1. "New Dogs New Tricks" – 3:47
2. "South Central" – 3:45
3. "Stuck Between a Rock and a White Face" – 3:16
4. "A More Violent Approach" – 3:56
5. "Norfuckinmality" – 3:03
6. "For Want of a Better World" – 3:37
7. "I Think Therefore I'm Damned" – 3:28
8. "Remain Calm" – 3:27
9. "Available in All Colours" – 4:42
10. "Brainspiller" – 4:48
11. "A Waste of Things to Come" – 3:03
12. "And Some Ya Lose" – 3:12
13. "Pig Until Proven Cop" – 7:55
14. "Half Empty" – 3:44 (Japanese edition bonus track)
15. "Yank My Doodle Dandy" – 4:00 (Japanese edition bonus track)
16. "Going Gone (Demo)" – 3:08 (Japanese edition bonus track)
17. "And Counting (Demo) – 2:40 (Japanese edition bonus track)
