= Aggressive Measures =

Studio album by Sinister
- Released: 16 October 1998
- Recorded: April–May 1998 at Studio Excess in Rotterdam, the Netherlands
- Genre: Death metal
- Length: 31:03
- Label: Nuclear Blast
- Producer: Vincent Dijkers, Sinister

Sinister chronology
Hate (1995)	Aggressive Measures (1998)	Creative Killings (2001)

Professional ratings
Review scores
Source	Rating
Chronicles of Chaos	7/10 stars

Aggressive Measures is the fourth studio album by Dutch death metal band Sinister. It was released on 16 October 1998 through Nuclear Blast Records. This album was featured a new line-up which is Eric de Windt as vocalist and Alex Paul as bassist. Originally the band wanted Wes Benscoter to create another cover but he was busy with other commitments.

== Track listing ==
All music and lyrics by Sinister.

No.	Title	Length
1.	"Intro ('The Upcoming')"	1:14
2.	"Aggressive Measures"	3:44
3.	"Beyond the Superstition"	2:57
4.	"Into the Forgotten"	3:43
5.	"Enslave the Weak"	4:33
6.	"Fake Redemption"	3:19
7.	"Chained in Reality"	4:38
8.	"Emerged with Hate"	2:37
9.	"Blood Follows the Blood"	4:18
Total length:		31:03

Japanese Edition bonus tracks
No.	Title	Length
10.	"Bastard Saints"
11.	"Rebels Dome"

== Personnel ==
Sinister

- Eric de Windt – Vocals
- Alex Paul – Bass
- Bart van Wallenberg – Guitars
- Aad Kloosterwaard – Drums

Production

- Klarsicht – Layout
- Thomas Ewerhard – Cover art
- Hans Pieters – Engineering
- Vincent Dijkers – Engineering, Producer
- Angelique Van Woerkom – Photography
