= 20 Dead Flower Children =

- Origin: Detroit, Michigan, U.S.
- Genres: Industrial metal, nu metal, rap metal, alternative metal
- Years active: 1994-2001, 2006
- Labels: Overture Records, Overcore Records, TVT Records

20 Dead Flower Children were an American electronic metal band from Detroit, Michigan, which formed in 1994. They released two records during 1996–1997, before breaking up in the early 2000s.

== History ==
Formed during 1994, the band released their self-titled debut 20 Dead Flower Children through local label Overture Records in February 1996. The vocalist for this record, known as "Von", would depart shortly after it was released. While his departure placed 20 Dead Flower Children's future in doubt, they would eventually find a new vocalist, Dennis "D-Hauz" Hogan, and signed to rapper Esham's Overcore Records. Their second album, titled Candy Toy Guns and Television, was released by the label on June 24, 1997.

In 1998, the band replaced their bassist and relocated to Huntington Beach, California. They later joined the TVT Records roster, as Overcore Records had become a subsidiary of TVT. The label would reissue Candy Toy Guns and Television on Halloween of 2000. However, this partnership yielded no new studio recording (TVT never asked for a new record). Instead, paid $30k to Scott Santos for re-release of Candy Toy Guns), aside from various demos released by the band themselves (and performing on the "Farmclub" National TV show & 3-month tour with ICP), in 2001, 20 Dead Flower Children split up due to lack of tour support from TVT.

On June 3, 2006, a one-off reunion show occurred at The Brigg in Huntington Beach.

== Members ==
=== Final line-up ===
- Dennis Hogan ‘D-Hauz’ – (vocals)
- Keith Lowers – (guitars/programming)
- Jason Garrison – (drums)
- Dirt-E (David Biganeiss) – (bass)

=== Past members ===
- Von Bortz – (vocals)
- Justin Starr (bass)
- Michael Joh ‘Nico’ (bass)
- Jeff Wright (bass)

== Discography ==
=== Albums ===
- 20 Dead Flower Children (1996)
- Candy Toy Guns and Television (1997)

=== Singles ===
- "Here I Am" (1996)

=== Demos ===
- Garage Demos (2001)
