= Stormcrowfleet =

Studio album by Skepticism
- Released: 1995
- Recorded: 1994
- Genre: Funeral doom
- Length: 57:19
- Label: Red Stream Inc
- Producer: Skepticism

Skepticism chronology
Aeothe Kaear (1993)	Stormcrowfleet (1995)	Ethere (1997)

Stormcrowfleet is the debut album by the Finnish funeral doom metal band Skepticism. It is one of the most important releases of the genre, and is considered a classic within it.

== Background ==
The band was founded in 1991, and was awarded a record deal with American independent label Red Stream, Inc. in 1993 after the release of their demo tape Aeothe Kaear. The band subsequently recorded three new pieces and rearranged three songs from the demo.

As the decisive moment in their genesis, keyboardist Eero Pöyry recalled his change from guitar to keyboard along with the consideration of how the instrument should be integrated into the sound of the band from then on. Following the idea of playing the keyboard as a synthetic organ, drummer Lasse Pelkonen also adapted his equipment and playing style. From then on, among other things, he used felt mallets instead of the drumsticks usually present in heavy metal. In another interview, he described that and how the band found an independent sacred sound as an intuitive process.

"The instrument changes could be described as organic. We never had an explicit plan on how we should sound or what we should do. We were and are working on intuition. It took us a year to find our sound and our roles in creating it. So I would not say we were displeased with our previous sound - we were just incomplete with it."

Meanwhile, the daily rehearsal with the idea to set itself apart from classic metal bands was significant for the phase of the band. They channeled ideas and influences of their previous musical career and their musical socialization in the creation of the album to a creative basic structure, which after Pöyry could be regarded as the basis of their further work. The band acted with the bass player J. Korpihete, who did not become part of the band. Pöyry expressly described Korpihete as a "session member" whose participation included an integration into the design process of the album in addition to the playing of the instrument, but was only a temporary solution.

== Artwork ==
As with some of Skepticism's later releases, the cover of the album was illustrated by the close-up of an object, which cannot be clearly identified in the picture alone, unlike the pictures of Rauch on Farmakon or a suit on Ordeal used later. The photographs of branches and water surfaces in the same color used in the interior of the booklet indicate a corresponding object. The picture shows shapes in reddish to yellow-orange coloring on a black background. The lyrics for the songs are printed inside the booklet. The back cover of the album illustrates the photo of the reflections of a water surface. The pictures were all selected by the band under the self-designation as Lihtede Group. The graphic processing was carried out by Arts Industria.

== Release ==
Stromcrowfleet was first released via Red Stream in 1995, initially the album's release was limited to a CD format. The album was first released with six separate tracks and a playing time of 57:19 minutes. No changes were made to this volume of the album in later editions and bonus material was also not added.

The first re-releases of the album kept the CD format. The album was first released in a vinyl version in 2018 by Svart Records. In 2017, the band bought the master tapes and was looking for a cooperation partner and a studio to release the recordings in vinyl format for the first time. For the 2018 release as a double vinyl, the tapes were remixed in Astia studios with high-quality analog technology, but the band made no changes to the original recordings of the songs. In meetings, the revision was mentioned as a significant improvement in sound quality.

Further reissues have been made by various labels such as Russian label Irond Ltd. and British label Peaceville Records.

In 2021, the album's original mix, along with the band's earlier albums before Ordeal, was removed from online streaming services and was replaced by a new mix done by Anssi Kippo in 2018. This issue contains a bonus outro.

== Track listing ==
- All songs written and arranged by Skepticism.
1. "Sign of a Storm" – 10:13
2. "Pouring" – 8:48
3. "By Silent Wings" – 7:06
4. "The Rising of the Flames" – 11:31
5. "The Gallant Crow" – 7:39
6. "The Everdarkgreen" – 12:15

== Personnel ==
- Lasse Pelkonen - Drums
- Jani Kekarainen - Guitars
- Eero Pöyry - Keyboards
- Matti - Vocals
