= Serial Joe =

Canadian musical group

- Origin: Newmarket, Ontario, Canada
- Genres: Rap rock; post-grunge; nu metal; alternative metal; hard rock; punk rock (early)
- Years active: 1997–2002
- Label: Aquarius Records
- Past members: John Davidson; Ryan Dennis; Dan Stadnicki; Ryan Stever; Jamie Fulcher

Serial Joe was a Canadian rock band from Newmarket, Ontario, which consisted of high school students Ryan Dennis (vocals, guitar), Ryan Stever (guitar), John Davidson (bass guitar), Dan Stadnicki (drums), and Jamie Fulcher (backing vocals). The group released four studio albums.

Dennis stated that the band's name came from a girl with a speech disorder who would mispronounce the name "Sergio" as "Serial-Joe".

== History ==
In 1998, Serial Joe independently released their debut EP, KICKeD. The EP featured the single "Skidrow". The music video for "Skidrow" won the 1998 MuchMusic Video Award for "Best Independent Video. The band became the house band on YTV's System Crash.

In 1999, the band released their first studio album for Aquarius Records, Face Down, which peaked at No. 47 on the Canadian Albums Chart. The album's first single, "Mistake", gained international airplay.

The band won several awards, and performed at Woodstock 1999 in the "emerging artists" tent.

In late 2001, Serial Joe released their final album Last Chance (At the Romance Dance), which showcased a more melodic pop/rock approach, in contrast to the band's earlier rap-influenced metal sound. The opening track, "Completely", was released as a single and topped the Canadian Singles Chart for three weeks in October and November 2001. Around 2002, they were dropped from their label and broke up shortly thereafter. Vocalist Ryan Dennis and guitarist Ryan Stever later became part of the hard rock group High Kapitol.

== Awards ==
- 1998 "Skidrow": Much Music Video Award for Best Independent Video
- 1999 YTV Achievement Award for Best Band
- 1999 (Nominated) "Mistake": Much Music Video Award for Best Rock Video
- 2000 "Deep": Much Music Video FACT Award for Best Video (presented by Kiss members Paul Stanley and Gene Simmons during a tour with them)
- 2000 (Nominated) Much Music People's Choice Award for Best Canadian Band
- 2000 (Nominated) Juno Award for Best New Band
- 2000 (Nominated) Gemini Award for Best Specialty Show

== Discography ==
KICKeD (1998)

1. Skidrow
2. Dream Girl
3. Velocity
4. Lonely Heart
5. Obsession
6. Welcome To Happyland

Face Down (1999) (Gold)

1. Should Have Been Mine
2. Deep
3. Mistake
4. Face Down
5. Dragon On My Shoulder
6. Shallow
7. Push
8. Sanity
9. Centipede
10. Confused
11. Outrage
12. Denial

Serial Joe... (2000)

1. Silently Screaming
2. Out Of Hand
3. Absence Of Mind
4. What I See
5. Another Time
6. False Design
7. Mistake: USA Version
8. Face Down: My Brilliant Beast Mix
9. Should Have Been Mine: MetalDog Mix
10. Deep: MetalDog Mix
11. Absence of Mind: Jimi LaMort's Absinthe Mix
12. What I See: Malhavoc's "Help Please Send Bobo" Mix

(Last Chance) At the Romance Dance... (2001)

1. Completely
2. Angry
3. Unintended
4. Stranded
5. Mary
6. Turn Around
7. Suddenly
8. Girl Like You
9. You Don't Laugh
10. Go for a Ride
11. Committed
12. Save Me
