= One Minute Silence =

Irish nu metal band

- Origin: Dublin, Ireland
- Genres: Rap metal, nu metal
- Years active: 1995–2003; 2011–present
- Labels: Big Cat Records (1997–2002); Taste Media (2002–2003); Micro Records/Micro Inc. Recordings (1995–1997, 2011–present)
- Members: Brian "Yap" Barry; Massimo Fiocco; Martin Davies; Glen Diani
- Past members: Eddie Stratton; Kee Payne; Chris Ignatiou

One Minute Silence is an Irish four-piece rap metal and nu metal band based in Dublin. The lineup consists of vocalist Brian "Yap" Barry from Templemore, County Tipperary; guitarist Massimo Fiocco from London; drummer Martin Davies; and bassist Glen Diani from Gibraltar. The band announced its split in a press release on 21 October 2003, after eight years together, and officially reconvened in 2011 without original drummer Eddie Stratton.

== Biography ==
=== Formation and early days (1995–1996) ===
One Minute Silence came together in the early 1990s when Irish vocalist Brian Barry got together with guitarist Chris Ignatiou from London, under the name "Near Death Experience". After working with various rhythm sections, they settled with Gibraltarian Glen Diani on bass guitar and Englishman Eddie Stratton on drums. Barry had befriended Stratton before the formation of the band. The band was soon forced to change its name because of an American group who shared it, and so it became One Minute Silence. That name, originally intended to be the title of a song, was chosen to parody the practice of having a one-minute silence as a mark of respect when someone considered "important or well respected" dies. The band felt that that respect was often "misplaced".

=== Big Cat Records and Available in All Colors (1997–1998) ===
The band signed a recording contract with Big Cat Records in 1997 and released Available in All Colors the following year.

=== Payne's departure and Buy Now... Saved Later (1999–2001) ===
Buy Now... Saved Later followed in 2000 after an amicable split with Ignatiou (now employed by MI6), who was ultimately replaced by Italian Massimo Fiocco, known as Massy, after original replacement Kee Payne left the band in 1999. This second album represented a noticeable step in the band's musical progression: the record's production quality and style differed from that of the first, which had used a hip-hop producer. Buy Now... sounded more like a metal album. With its well-rounded production and matured song-writing, Buy Now... sent the band on a tour of the US, with notable acts such as Slipknot and Mudvayne, the latter touring with them in the UK as supporting act.

=== One Lie Fits All and break-up (2002–2003) ===
After circulating a three-track demo and signing a deal with Taste Media, the band started recording sessions for their third album in autumn 2002. From live performances and both live and studio recordings, the new material was obviously a further progression; the group was experimenting with various time signatures, such as 7/4, and was using more melody and a greater variation in song structure.

A single, "We Bounce", was released on 31 March 2003, with a third album, titled One Lie Fits All, following on 7 July that year. According to the band's now-defunct website "[t]his name continues the pattern of manipulating well known marketing slogans in order to present a political statement".

Between these releases, One Minute Silence had toured extensively, though the last tour had to be cancelled. The group's following came largely from their energetic live shows – they have been voted "Best British Live Act" in Kerrang! magazine.

In October 2003, the band announced its split:

Although we are still the best of friends, and cannot rule out the possibility of working together in the future, for now we are dispersing to pursue other projects and interests. We're still in love, we're just not married any more!! There are no musical differences, and no personal conflicts affecting our friendship with each other, just a desire to branch out and explore other areas of life and music.

The band would like to extend their infinite love and respect to those who have championed OMS over the years, whether from within the industry and the media or from without. Your support has been life-giving. An extra-special acknowledgement is due to the people who have come to our shows, and especially to the people in the pit, because without you there would have been no OMS, and without people to listen, music would be meaningless. You rule, we love you, and we miss you already!!

Looking to the future; Yap is going full-throttle into spoken word performances, and he is also working on a number of political and philosophical media projects.

Glen Diani and Massy Fiocco are currently considering and inviting other options. Eddie Stratton is currently filling in on drums with his friends in New Disease.

After One Minute Silence's break-up, Yap followed his spoken-word career, appearing on BBC Radio 4's Bespoken Word.

=== Post-One Minute Silence (2004–2010) ===
After One Minute Silence, Barry began to write and perform new material as a slam poet and public speaker. The new material began to grow into a music project when he met producer John Hendicott and vocalist Donna Williams in 2005. A new band, Pink Punk, was formed and in 2006 the first album, Zoo Politics, emerged as an independent release on Freeport Records. The band's website, PPunk.com, went live later in 2006 and by the end of the year the album was on iTunes, Napster and more than 7000 digital retailers worldwide through Universal Digital and IODA (US). Pink Punk had a live show in late 2007.

In March 2008, vocalist Barry touched on the issue of a possible reunion and fourth album in an article posted on the band's unofficial Myspace page.

In 2008, Edwin Stratton was suffering severely from coeliac disease. He was arrested in mid-2008 after fire investigators, looking into a fire in a wine bar below his Leyton apartment, discovered cannabis plants in his home. Stratton stated that he was growing for medical use, but was charged with producing the drug cannabis, exposing him to a potential maximum sentence of 14 years in prison. Snaresbrook Crown Court handed down a sentence of three months in prison, suspended for one year with £500 costs, and prohibited Stratton from owning hydroponic equipment for one year. In November 2008, he was due to appear at the Waltham Forest Magistrates' Court and challenge the charge as a contravention of Article 14 of the Human Rights Act, which prohibits discrimination on any grounds.

=== Reformation (2011–present) ===
In 2011, Barry, Diani and Fiocco reunited, joined by new drummer Martin Davies.

On 10 January 2011, One Minute Silence announced their official reformation and tour with new material also in the pipeline. Band members for the tour and record are Barry, Fiocco, Diani and Davies.

Fragmented Armageddon EP was released on 3 May 2013.

== Discography ==
=== Albums ===
Year	Album details	Peak chart positions				
Year	Album details	UK	UK Rock	UK Indie	NZ	SCO
1998	Available in All Colors: Released: 28 April 1998; Label: Big Cat Records; Formats: CD	—	—	—	31	—
2000	Buy Now... Saved Later: Released: 10 April 2000; Label: V2 Records; Formats: CD	61	—	—	—	65
2003	One Lie Fits All: Released: 7 July 2003; Label: Taste Records; Formats: CD	139	20	16	—	—
2024	The Vault: Released: 19 January 2024; Label: Self; Formats: Digital Download	—	—	—	—	—
"—" denotes a title that did not chart.

- One Minute Silence: Live in the Studio was released in 2013 via PledgeMusic as an incentive for fans to donate to the band's costs of recording a new EP. It is a live album with new songs.

=== EPs ===
Year	Album details
2003	Revolution: Released: 2003; Label: Taste
2013	Fragmented Armageddon: Released: 17 June 2013; Label: New Dogs New Tricks

=== Singles ===
Year	Title	Peak chart positions		Album
Year	Title	US Main.	UK	Album
1998	"South Central"	—	—	Available in All Colors
1998	"A Waste of Things to Come"	—	199	Available in All Colors
1998	"Stuck Between a Rock and a White Face"	—	148	Available in All Colors
2000	"Holy Man"	39	112	Buy Now... Saved Later
2000	"Fish Out of Water"	—	56	Buy Now... Saved Later
2000	"Rise and Shine"	—	—	Buy Now... Saved Later
2003	"Revolution"	—	138	One Lie Fits All
2003	"We Bounce"	—	—	One Lie Fits All
2003	"I Wear My Skin"	—	44	One Lie Fits All
"—" denotes a title that did not chart.
