= Sinister (band) =

Dutch death metal band

- Origin: Schiedam, Netherlands
- Genre: Death metal
- Years active: 1988–2003, 2005–present
- Labels: Witchhunt, Seraphic Decay, Sicktone, Nuclear Blast, Metal Mind, Massacre
- Members: Aad Kloosterwaard; Walter Bokito Tjwa; Simon Skrlec
- Past members: Ron van de Polder; Mike van Mastrigt; Corzas Nanuruw; Frank Faaze; Andre Tolhuizen; Bart van Wallenberg; Michel Alderliefsten; Eric de Windt; Joost Silvrants; Rachel van Mastrigt-Heyzer; Pascal Grevinga; Paul Beltman; Mathijs Brussaard; Bastiaan Brussaard
- Website: facebook.com/SinisterOfficial

Sinister is a death metal band from Schiedam, the Netherlands, formed in 1988. They have released fourteen albums, most recently Deformation of the Holy Realm in 2020.

The band played Wacken Open Air in August 2003. The band was idle between 2003 and 2005, after which Aad Kloosterwaard, the only constant member, switched from drums to vocals.

The band finished with recordings of the 15th album in October 2023. The recordings are currently in the studio for mix and mastering. Soon they will announce the release date.

== Members ==
=== Current members ===
- Aad Kloosterwaard - vocals (2005–present), drums (1988-2003)
- Walter Bokito Tjwa - guitar (2018–present)
- Simon Skrlec - drums (2022–present)
- Aleša Kloosterwaard - bass (2024–present)

=== Former members ===
- Mike (Sinister) van Mastrigt - vocals (1988–1996)
- Ron van de Polder - guitar, bass (1988–1992, 2003)
- Corzas Nanuruw - bass (1989–1991)
- Andre Tolhuizen - guitar (1991–1994)
- Frank Faaze - guitar (1991)
- Bart van Wallenberg - guitar, bass (1992–2002)
- Michel Alderliefsten - bass (1996)
- Eric de Windt - vocals (1997–1999)
- Alex Paul - bass (1997–2003), guitar (2005–2011)
- Joost Silvrants - vocals (2000)
- Rachel Heyzer - vocals (2001–2003)
- Pascal Grevinga - guitar (2003)
- Paul Beltman - drums (2005–2008)
- Bas van den Bogaard - bass (2005–2011)
- Edwin van den Eeden - drums (2008–2011)
- Dennis Hartog - guitar (2011–2020)
- Mathijs Brussaard - bass (2011–2015)
- Léon Caufijn - bass (2015–2016)
- Bastiaan Brussaard - guitar (2011–2017)
- Ricardo Falcon - guitar (2016–2018)
- Toep Duin - drums (2011–2022)
- Nick Kleinee - bass (2023–2024)

== Discography ==
=== Studio albums ===
- Cross the Styx (1992)
- Diabolical Summoning (1993)
- Hate (1995)
- Aggressive Measures (1998)
- Creative Killings (2001)
- Savage or Grace (2003)
- Afterburner (2006)
- The Silent Howling (2008)
- Legacy of Ashes (2010)
- The Carnage Ending (2012)
- The Post-Apocalyptic Servant (2014)
- Dark Memorials (2015) (covers album)
- Syncretism (2017)
- Deformation of the Holy Realm (2020)
- Lucid Nightmares (2026)

=== EPs and singles ===
- Putrefying Remains/Spiritual Immolation (1990)
- Sinister (1990)
- Bastard Saints (1996)
- The Unborn Dead (2014)
- Gods of the Abyss (2017)

=== Music Videos ===
- Leviathan (1993)
- The Science of Prophecy (2014)
- Neurophobic (2017)

=== DVDs ===
- Prophecies Denied (2006)
