= Skepticism (band) =

Finnish funeral doom band

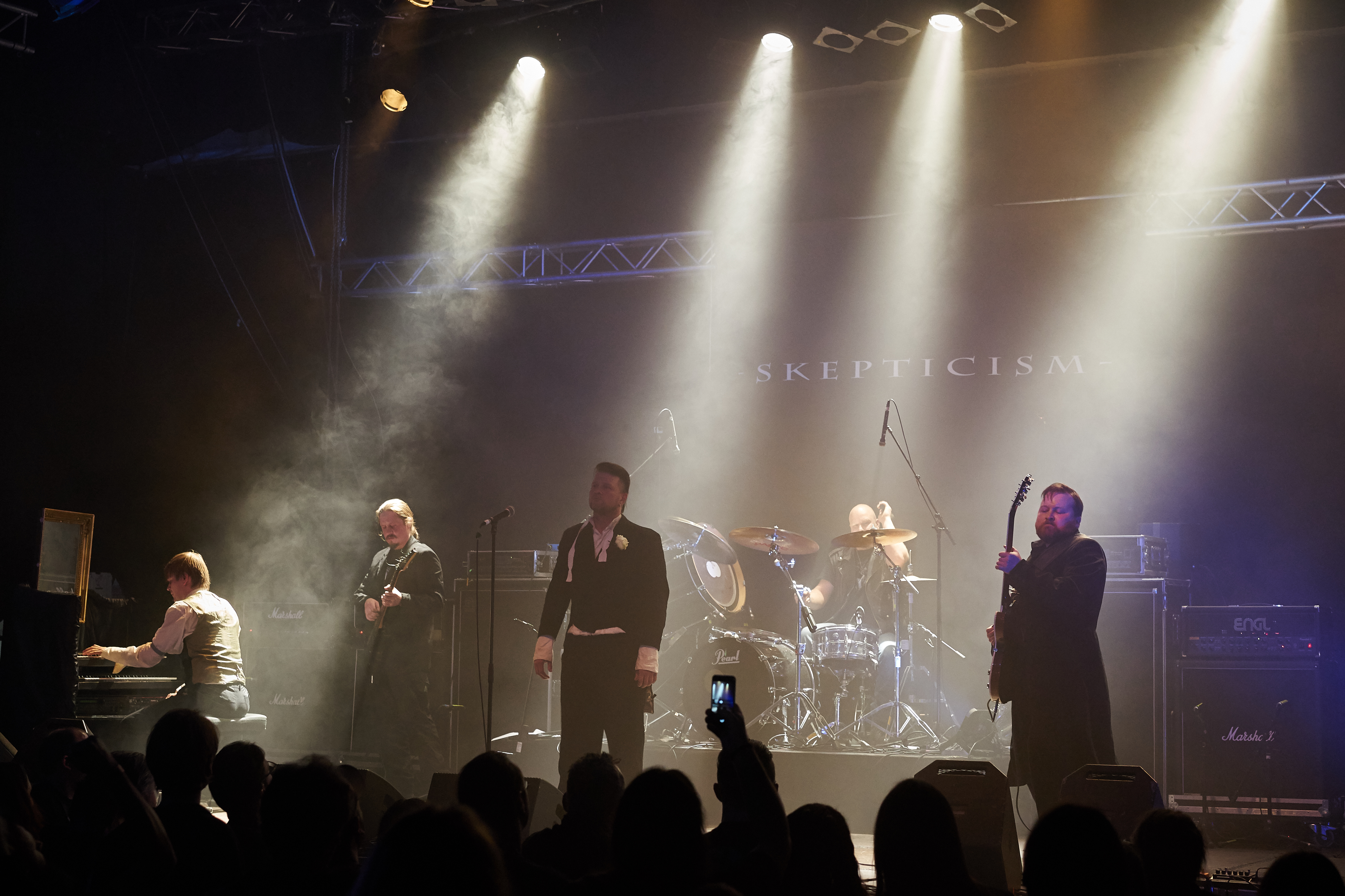
- Skepticism performing in Germany, 2015

Background information
- Origin: Riihimäki, Finland
- Genres: Funeral doom metal
- Years active: 1991–present
- Labels: Red Stream
- Members: Matti Tilaeus; Jani Kekarainen; Pasi Pöyry; Lasse Pelkonen
- Past members: J. Korpihete
- Website: skepticism.fi

Skepticism is a Finnish funeral doom metal band. Formed in 1991, they are regarded as one of the pioneers of the genre.

== History ==
Starting out with a death metal sound on their first 7", Skepticism soon began to evolve into a more distinctive style, a combination of slow doom metal and death metal with prolific use of keyboards, especially using an organ sound. The keyboards intend to create a depressive sound, rather than the gothic sound that many metal bands using keyboards tend to focus on. This style was first heard on the Aeothe Kaear demo (1994), which was still up-tempo compared to the material that was to follow. The debut album Stormcrowfleet (1995) pushed the band's style away from traditional doom metal.

After this, the band released its first 'pair', an EP and album which are thematically connected: Ethere (1997) and Lead and Aether (1998). In 1999, Aes was released, a one-track EP lasting almost 28 minutes, and another departure into different stylistic territory from the band. A variety of musical themes are explored before the song turns back upon itself and returns to the opening theme.

The band's latest releases were contained in the second 'pair', The Process of Farmakon (2002) and Farmakon (2003). These releases involve another slight departure from earlier releases, by introducing more elements of dissonance and experimentation. Their 2008 release is called Alloy. In 2015, Skepticism released Ordeal, which was recorded live in front of an audience.

In 2021, the band released their sixth album, Companion, and a music video for the song "Calla".

== Band members ==
- Matti Tilaeus – vocals (1991–)
- Jani Kekarainen – guitar (1991–)
- Eero Pöyry – keyboards (1991–)
- Lasse Pelkonen – drums (1991–)

Live musicians

- Timo Sitomaniemi – guitars (2015–)

Former members

- Tobias Kellgren – vocals (1991–1993)

== Discography ==
=== Studio albums ===
- Stormcrowfleet (1995, Red Stream)
- Lead and Aether (1997, Red Stream)
- Farmakon (2003, Red Stream)
- Alloy (2008, Red Stream)
- Ordeal (2015, Svart Records)
- Companion (2021, Svart Records)

=== Demos, singles and EPs ===
- "Towards My End" (7" Single, 1992)
- Aeothe Kaear (Demo, 1994)
- Ethere (EP, 1997, Red Stream)
- Aes (EP, 1998, Red Stream)
- The Process of Farmakon (EP, 2002, Red Stream)
