= Shootyz Groove =

American rap rock band

- Origin: The Bronx, New York, U.S.
- Genres: Rap rock; rap metal; funk metal
- Years active: 1992—present
- Labels: Mercury, Roadrunner, Reprise
- Members: Season Love; Sense Live; Donny Rock; Paul "Freak Love"; Dose Big
- Past members: Spec (Eric)

Shootyz Groove is an American rap rock band formed in Bronx, New York City in 1992.

== History ==
Formed in 1992, the band originally consisted of Donny on guitar, Spec on bass guitar, Dose on drums, and their two MCs Season and Sense. Their members have had various different ethnic backgrounds, including Croatian, Puerto Rican, Albanian and French. Within two years the band had a record deal with Mercury Records and released a live EP (recorded in Queens) in 1994, with their first full-length album, Jammin' in Vicious Environments (J.I.V.E.), released a year later on vinyl and CD. In support of their album, Shootyz Groove toured with many acts on both ends of their musical spectrum, including The Mighty Mighty Bosstones, Slayer, Boogie Down Productions and 311. By 1995, bass guitarist Spec had left the band, they were no longer with Mercury Records, and they released their hard-to-find live album, Live J.I.V.E..

After recruiting a new bass guitar player, Paul "Freak Love", and thanks to frequent touring, the band was signed by Roadrunner Records. In June 1997, they released their first Roadrunner Records album, Hipnosis. Shootyz Groove then moved to Reprise Records and resurfaced two years later with High Definition and gained popularity with single "L Train". Shootyz Groove broke up after this album, some of the members starting a band called Dead Fly Syndrome. In 2004, Shootyz Groove reappeared. They have released a demo of "Heard That All Before" taken from their forthcoming, untitled album on their website. In early versions of iTunes, "L Train" was bundled. Some of their tracks, including "Blow Your Top" and "Mad For It", were included in the PlayStation game, Street Skater 2. "Mad For It" was also featured in the game Shaun Palmer's Pro Snowboarder. Eventually, they signed to a Japanese label.

== Band members ==
Current members

- Season Love – vocals (1992––present)
- Sense Live – vocals (1992––present)
- Donny Rock – guitar (1992–present)
- Paul "Freak Love" – bass (1995–present)
- Dose Big – drums (1992–present)

Former members

- Spec – bass (1992–1995)

== Discography ==
=== Albums ===
| Released | Title | Label |
|---|---|---|
| 1994 | Jammin' in Vicious Environments | Mercury |
| 1997 | Hipnosis | Roadrunner |
| 1999 | High Definition | Reprise |
| 2009 | One | RB |

=== Singles ===
| Released | Title | Album |
|---|---|---|
| 1993 | "Buddahful Day" | Respect |
| 1994 | "The Craze" | Jammin' in Vicious Environments |
| 1997 | "Lillypad" | Hipnosis |
| 1997 | "Once" | Hipnosis |
| 1999 | "L Train" | High Definition |

=== Other releases ===
- Respect EP (1993)
- Generation of Hope (EP with downset.) (1995)
- Live J.I.V.E. (1995)
