= Solinari (album) =

Studio album by Morgion
- Released: 1999
- Length: 52:44
- Label: Relapse Records

Morgion chronology
Among Majestic Ruin (1996)	Solinari (1999)	Cloaked by Ages, Crowned in Earth (2004)

Solinari is the second album by the American doom metal band Morgion. It was released in 1999 by Relapse Records.

== Track listing ==
1. "The Serpentine Scrolls / Descent to Arawn" – 10:33
2. "Canticle" – 6:42
3. "Solinari" – 2:26
4. "Nightfall Infernal" – 11:06
5. "All the Glory..." – 6:04
6. "...All the Loss" – 6:21
7. "Blight" – 4:46
8. "...The Last Sunrise" – 4:48
