= Night in Gales =

German melodic death metal band

Night in Gales is a German death metal band from Voerde.

== History ==
The band was formed in May 1995 by Christian Müller (vocals), Jens and Frank Basten (both guitarists), Tobias Bruchmann (bass and vocals) and Christian Bass (drums) in Voerde. After releasing the demo Sylphlike and the EP Razor, Müller left the band and was replaced by Björn Gooßes.

The band was signed by Nuclear Blast, with whom the band released Nailwork, following which they switched over to Massacre Records. A split with Massacre Records followed in 2001, during a European tour with God Dethroned, after which most members went off to focus on other projects.

A year later Christian Bass, the drummer, left the band, in order to concentrate on his Metalcore band Deadsoil. He was replaced in 2003 by Adriano Ricci. After a mini-tour with Fear My Thoughts and Bitterness, in 2005 the band released the free four-track EP Ten Years of Tragedy, to celebrate their tenth anniversary.

In 2011, the band released another CD titled Five Scars through Lifeforce Records. Björn Gooßes, who had been the lead singer in the meantime, left the band again, and original singer Christian Müller rejoined. Together, they recorded the album The Last Sunsets, which was released through Apostasy Records in February 2018.

== Discography ==
- 1995: Sylphlike (Demo)
- 1996: Razor (Single)
- 1997: Towards the Twilight
- 1998: Thunderbeast (2008 Re-Release, Remastered)
- 2000: Nailwork
- 2001: Necrodynamic
- 2005: Ten Years of Tragedy (EP)
- 2011: Five Scars
- 2014: Ashes & Ends
- 2018: The Last Sunsets
- 2020: Dawnlight Garden
