= Morgion (band) =

American doom/death metal band

Morgion was an American doom/death metal band from Orange County, California, United States. Morgion was formed in 1990 by Dwayne Boardman (guitars), Jeremy Peto (vocals, bass), Mike Davis (guitars) and Rhett Davis (drums). The band recorded their debut “Rabid Decay” demo in 1991, followed by the “Travesty” 7" in 1993. With the addition of Bobby Thomas (guitars) and Ed Parker (keyboards) in 1994, Morgion recorded what would become Among Majestic Ruin, licensed for release to Relapse Records in 1996. In 1995, Gary Griffith joined Morgion as a replacement for Parker on keyboards. In 1998, Thomas departed and Griffith took on both guitar and keyboard duties. Morgion then wrote and recorded Solinari; released by Relapse Records in 1999. After being shelved by Relapse Records because they didn't know how to promote the band and Jeremy Peto (bass/vocals) leaving, Morgion took a hiatus to recoup. 2002 saw the band moving forward with Justin Christian on bass and an album partnership with Dark Symphonies. Cloaked by Ages, Crowned in Earth, the final album, was released in April 2004. Morgion toured Europe on the Doomination Tour, during that tour they decided it would be their last and Morgion would be no more. Despite their name being on the US Doomination Tour, Morgion did not play any shows. Rhett and Justin went as roadies for the other bands, Gary and Dwayne did not go. 2004 saw the official end of Morgion.

On April 19, 2008, former members Boardman (vocals/guitars), Christian (bass), Griffith (vocals/guitars/keyboards) and Surowski (drums) played a short Morgion set at the Murderfest in Hollywood, California to commemorate the release of Relapse Records' "Morgion: The Relapse Years." The appearance was planned to be the Solinari lineup, but a fallout between members changed plans. This would be the last ever show for Morgion. The Relapse release contains the recordings "Among Majestic Ruin" and Solinari, along with previously unreleased songs, demos and rehearsal tracks from the Relapse era, all remastered February 2008 by Griffith and Mathais Schneeburger (who co-produced the albums Solinari and Cloaked by Ages, Crowned in Earth).

A compilation of early demo recordings entitled God of Death & Disease was released in 2012 by Dark Descent Records. The original Solinari lineup was invited to play a one-off "reunion" gig at Maryland Deathfest in 2012, but the bassist sustained an arm injury that forced the band to reschedule the show for the following year. Just a few short months before they were set to appear at Maryland Deathfest 2013, the lineup once again suffered a fallout between members and they were forced to cancel their appearance.

== Trivia ==
Morgion is also the name of the god of plague and disease in the world of Dragonlance, coinciding with their debut Rabid Decay and is where the band took their name from. Their album Solinari is also named after a god in the Dragonlance world, Solinari, as a god of magic and ruler of those who wear the white robes. Rhett Davis (lyrics and titles), not knowing his Dragonlance lore very well, stated that Solinari was the black moon in Dragonlance lore, but Solinari is in fact the name of the white moon. 'Nuitari' is the name of the black moon and, given the album artwork, is likely Solinaris' true intended album title.

== Members ==
=== Final line-up ===
- Dwayne Boardman - death vocals, guitars (1990–2001, 2002–2004)
- Gary Griffith - guitars, clean vocals, keyboards (1995–2004)
- Justin Christian - bass (2002–2004)
- Rhett Davis - drums (1990–1999, 2001–2004)

=== Former members ===
- Jeremy Peto - death vocals, bass (1990-2001)
- Bobby Thomas - guitar (1994-1996)
- Ed Parker - keyboards (1994-1995)
- Mike Davis - guitar (1990-1993)
- Jason Likus - guitar (1993)
- Brandon Livingston - keyboards (1999; died 1999)
- Peter Surowski - keyboards (2001-2002)
- Adrian Leroux - clean vocals, death vocals on Doomination Tour (2003)

== Discography ==
- Rabid Decay (1991)
- Live Rehearsal (1992)
- Travesty (1993)
- Among Majestic Ruin (1996)
- Solinari (1999)
- Cloaked by Ages, Crowned in Earth (2004)
- Morgion: The Relapse Years (2008)
- Morgion: God of Death & Disease (2012)
