= The Chthonic Chronicles =

Studio album by Bal-Sagoth
- Released: 10 March 2006
- Recorded: January 2003 – December 2005
- Genre: Symphonic black metal
- Length: 60:39
- Label: Nuclear Blast

Bal-Sagoth chronology
Atlantis Ascendant (2001)	The Chthonic Chronicles (2006)

Professional ratings
Review scores
Source	Rating
AllMusic	4/5 stars

The Chthonic Chronicles is the sixth studio album by English metal band Bal-Sagoth. The first in five years since 2001's Atlantis Ascendant, it is rumoured to be their last album. This album was released in Europe on 10 March 2006 through Nuclear Blast and in the US on 16 May through Candlelight Records. A remastered digipak edition from Metal Mind Productions followed in October 2011, while a second digipak release from Dissonance Productions and a limited edition gatefold vinyl version from Night of the Vinyl Dead were issued in October 2020, with a subsequent double vinyl gatefold edition being issued by Back on Black in 2022.

== Background ==
The Chthonic Chronicles is rumoured to be the band's final album. Their first album's introduction song is called "Hatheg-Kla", and the final song on The Chthonic Chronicles is called "Return to Hatheg-Kla", perhaps making their vision of an epic Hexalogy come full circle. Although Bal-Sagoth vocalist-lyricist Byron Roberts most often refers to The Chthonic Chronicles as "the end of the Hexalogy", this could also refer to the end of this particular set of stories. Byron has stated himself that there is an abundance of lyrical material left for the possible continuation of Bal-Sagoth.

=== Lyrical content ===
The album title refers to a key story element in the lyrics, and The Chthonic Chronicles themselves are a pure work of fiction from lyrics writer Byron Roberts. The somewhat rare word has been used in literature by T. S. Eliot, C. F. Keary and M. McCarthy, and is Greek in origin, meaning "earthly", specifically dealing with the underworld and spirits. (For more information, see Chthonic.)

Bal-Sagoth's now-established tradition of lyrics revolving around antediluvian settings, such as Atlantis, Lemuria and Mu, is once again present, and song titles such as "Shackled to the Trilithon of Kutulu" indicate that a heavy H. P. Lovecraft inspiration is present too. The band continues previous storylines (which began on previous albums) in the songs "Invocations Beyond the Outer-World Night", "The Obsidian Crown Unbound" and "Unfettering the Hoary Sentinels of Karnak".

== Reissues ==
In November 2011, The Chthonic Chronicles was reissued as a limited edition digipak by Nuclear Blast's affiliate label Metal Mind Productions. The reissue featured an expanded lyric booklet, additional artwork and remastered audio.

On October 16, 2020, The Chthonic Chronicles was reissued as a digipak CD edition via Dissonance Productions.

In October 2020, The Chthonic Chronicles was reissued as a double-vinyl gatefold edition limited to 400 copies, under license to the Italian record label "Night of the Vinyl Dead".

In May 2022, The Chthonic Chronicles was reissued as a double LP gatefold edition via the UK specialist vinyl label Back On Black.

== Track listing ==
- All lyrics written by Byron Roberts, all music written by Jonny Maudling and Chris Maudling.

No.	Title	Length
1.	"The Sixth Adulation of His Chthonic Majesty"	4:20
2.	"Invocations Beyond the Outer-World Night"	5:26
3.	"Six Score and Ten Oblations to a Malefic Avatar"	6:08
4.	"The Obsidian Crown Unbound"	5:58
5.	"The Fallen Kingdoms of the Abyssal Plain"	4:38
6.	"Shackled to the Trilithon of Kutulu"	4:02
7.	"The Hammer of the Emperor"	6:58
8.	"Unfettering the Hoary Sentinels of Karnak"	4:22
9.	"To Storm the Cyclopean Gates of Byzantium"	4:57
10.	"Arcana Antediluvia"	5:07
11.	"Beneath the Crimson Vaults of Cydonia"	5:15
12.	"Return to Hatheg-Kla"	3:28
Total length:		60:39

== Personnel ==
- Byron Roberts – vocals, artwork concept
- Chris Maudling – guitars
- Jonny Maudling – keyboards
- Mark Greenwell – bass
- Dan "Storm" Mullins – drums

=== Additional personnel ===
- Martin Hanford - cover art
- Mags - engineering (vocals)
- Achim Köhler - mastering
