= The Power Cosmic =

Studio album by Bal-Sagoth
- Released: October 11, 1999
- Recorded: 30 April – 31 May 1999 at Academy Music Studio, Yorkshire, England
- Genre: Symphonic black metal
- Length: 40:30
- Label: Nuclear Blast
- Producer: Mags

Bal-Sagoth chronology
Battle Magic (1998)	The Power Cosmic (1999)	Atlantis Ascendant (2001)

Professional ratings
Review scores
Source	Rating
Allmusic	3.5/5 stars

The Power Cosmic is the fourth album by the English metal band Bal-Sagoth, released in 1999. The album was their first recording for Nuclear Blast.

It was the first Bal-Sagoth album to not contain a full lyric booklet (earlier releases included a booklet with both lyrics and an accompanying story by vocalist/lyricist Byron Roberts). A lyric booklet was initially featured as downloadable content on the band's website; it was later released with the Russian sub-licensed edition of the album, and subsequently with the album's digipack reissue in November 2011. The album also marks a personnel change, as the trio became a quintet: Mark Greenwell joined on bass, which freed up Chris Maulding to focus on guitars, while Dave Mackintosh (later of the power metal band DragonForce) would handle drums, thus enabling Johnny Maulding to concentrate on keyboards and synthesizers.

The album focuses on Zurra, a rogue demigod released from his imprisonment beneath the Mare Imbrium who searches space to reassemble the powerful artifact known as the Empyreal Lexicon. The song "Of Carnage and a Gathering of the Wolves" takes place in Darkenhold forest, a location last referenced in track 9 of the album Starfire Burning Upon the Ice-Veiled Throne of Ultima Thule.

"The Scourge of the Fourth Celestial Host" references Marvel Comics hero The Silver Surfer battling the Fourth Celestial Host. Within the lyrics, The Silver Surfer is referred to by the name Norrin-Radd, Thor is referenced by mention of his "uru hammer", and Galactus is referred to by the name Galan of Taa. The celestials Arishem and Exitar, the watcher Uatu, and Shalla-Bal are also referenced within the song and lyrics. The album title, The Power Cosmic, is a reference to the superpowers possessed by Galactus and the Silver Surfer, and was chosen primarily because Byron Roberts is a great admirer of Marvel Comics and particularly the works of Jack Kirby, as mentioned in the 50th issue of the magazine The Jack Kirby Collector.

== Reissues ==
- November 2011: limited edition digipack released by Nuclear Blast's affiliate label Metal Mind Productions. Features an expanded lyric booklet, additional artwork, and remastered audio.
- July 2013: CD released in Argentina via Icarus Music under license from Nuclear Blast GmbH.
- October 2020: digipak CD edition released via Dissonance Productions.
- July 2021: limited edition vinyl LP released by Italian specialist vinyl label Night of the Vinyl Dead.
- May 2022: single disc gatefold sleeve LP, issues via the UK specialist vinyl label Back On Black.

== Track listing ==
All lyrics are written by Byron Roberts; all music is composed by Jonny and Chris Maudling

No.	Title	Length
1.	"The Awakening of the Stars"	1.30
2.	"The Voyagers Beneath the Mare Imbrium"	4.37
3.	"The Empyreal Lexicon"	6.02
4.	"Of Carnage and a Gathering of the Wolves"	6.00
5.	"Callisto Rising"	4.32
6.	"The Scourge of the Fourth Celestial Host"	6.39
7.	"Behold, the Armies of War Descend Screaming from the Heavens!"	5.54
8.	"The Thirteen Cryptical Prophecies of Mu"	5.12
Total length:		40:30

== Personnel ==
- Byron Roberts – vocals
- Chris Maudling – guitars
- Jonny Maudling – keyboards
- Mark Greenwell – bass
- Dave Mackintosh – drums

=== Additional personnel ===
- Martin Hanford – cover art
- Mags – engineering, producer, mixing
- J.C. Dhien – photography
