= Atlantis Ascendant =

Studio album by Bal-Sagoth
- Released: 17 April 2001
- Recorded: November–December 2000
- Genre: Symphonic black metal
- Length: 48:53
- Label: Nuclear Blast
- Producer: Mags

Bal-Sagoth chronology
The Power Cosmic (1999)	Atlantis Ascendant (2001)	The Chthonic Chronicles (2006)

Atlantis Ascendant is the fifth studio album by English metal band Bal-Sagoth. It was released in April 2001 through Nuclear Blast. This was the first Bal-Sagoth album to be recorded (albeit only partially) with digital recording technology.

The album's primary story and lyrical concept as written by vocalist-lyricist Byron Roberts centres on the exploits of a fictional nineteenth-century British archaeologist and adventurer named Professor Caleb Blackthorne III, who has dedicated his life to the field of antediluvian anthropology and to seeking out evidence as to the true nature of humanity's origin. As with many protagonists in the Lovecraftian fashion, his investigations lead to madness and death.

In November 2011, Atlantis Ascendant was reissued as a limited edition digipak by Nuclear Blast's affiliate label Metal Mind Productions. The reissue featured an expanded lyric booklet, additional artwork and remastered audio.

In July 2013, Atlantis Ascendant was released on CD in Argentina via Icarus Music under license from Nuclear Blast GmbH.

On 16 October 2020 Atlantis Ascendant was reissued as a digipak CD edition via Dissonance Productions.

In February 2021 a limited edition LP of Atlantis Ascendant featuring a lenticular 3D cover was released via the Italian specialist vinyl label Night of the Vinyl Dead.

In May 2022, Atlantis Ascendant was reissued as a single disc gatefold sleeve LP edition via the UK specialist vinyl label Back On Black.

== Track listing ==
All lyrics are written by Byron Roberts; all music is composed by Jonny Maudling and Chris Maudling.

No.	Title	Length
1.	"The Epsilon Exordium"	3:37
2.	"Atlantis Ascendant"	5:27
3.	"Draconis Albionensis"	6:18
4.	"Star-Maps of the Ancient Cosmographers"	5:12
5.	"The Ghosts of Angkor Wat"	2:22
6.	"Cry Havoc for Glory, and the Annihilation of the Titans of Chaos (The Splendour of a Thousand Swords Gleaming Beneath the Blazon of the Hyperborean Empire, Part III)"	7:18
7.	"The Dreamer in the Catacombs of Ur"	5:16
8.	"In Search of the Lost Cities of Antarctica"	5:42
9.	"The Chronicle of Shadows"	5:34
10.	"Six Keys to the Onyx Pyramid"	2:08
Total length:		48:53

Japan bonus tracks
No.	Title	Length
11.	"Dreaming of the Atlantean Spires: Alpha"	5:03
12.	"By the Blaze of the Fire Jewels: Zero"	5:02
Total length:		58:58

These bonus tracks were taken from the 1993 demo.

== Personnel ==
- Byron Roberts – vocals, cover art concept, design
- Chris Maudling – guitars
- Jonny Maudling – keyboards
- Mark Greenwell – bass
- Dave Mackintosh – drums

=== Additional personnel ===
- Mags – engineering, mixing, producer
- Martin Hanford – cover art, artwork (illustrations)
- Simon Lee – photography
