= Celtic Adventures =

2025 book edited by D. M. Ritzlin

- Cover of first edition
- Editor: D. M. Ritzlin
- Cover artist: Jim Fitzpatrick
- Language: English
- Genre: historical/fantasy/horror
- Publisher: DMR Books
- Publication date: 2025
- Publication place: United States
- Media type: print (paperback), ebook
- Pages: 220
- ISBN: 978-1-956173-26-0
- Preceded by: Viking Adventures

Celtic Adventures is an anthology of historical, fantasy and horror short stories and poetry edited by D. M. Ritzlin. It was first published in trade paperback and ebook by DMR Books in June 2025. It is a companion volume to the publisher's earlier themed anthologies Planetary Adventures, Prehistoric Adventures and Viking Adventures.

== Summary ==
The book collects six short stories and two poems by various authors, each set in Ireland or Scotland in the times of the historical Celts, together with an introduction by Deuce Richardson.

== Contents ==
- "Born Fighting: Celtic Adventures in Fact and Fiction" (Deuce Richardson)
- "The Druids" (poem) (from The Theosophical Path, Apr. 1926) (Kenneth Morris)
- "The Devil’s Dagger" (from Adventure, Sep. 1918) (Farnham Bishop and Arthur Gilchrist Brodeur)
- "People of the Dark" (from Strange Tales of Mystery and Terror, Jun. 1932) (Robert E. Howard)
- "The Harping of Cravetheen" (from The Sin-Eater and Other Tales, 1895) (Fiona Macleod)
- "A Claymore for the Clan" (from Adventure, Jul. 1948) (Donald Barr Chidsey)
- "The Horror in the Glen" (from Weird Tales, Mar. 1940) (Clyde Irvine)
- "Grana, Queen of Battle" (from The Cavalier, Oct. 11, 1913) (John Barnett)
- "Feach Air Muir Lionadhi Gealach Buidhe Mar Or" (poem) (from The Junto, Aug. 1929) (Robert E. Howard)
