= Battle Magic =

Studio album by Bal-Sagoth
- Released: November 2, 1998
- Recorded: October–December 1997 at Academy Music Studio, Yorkshire, England
- Genre: Symphonic black metal
- Length: 49:54
- Label: Cacophonous
- Producer: Mags

Bal-Sagoth chronology
| Starfire Burning Upon the Ice-Veiled Throne of Ultima Thule (1996) | Battle Magic (1998) | The Power Cosmic (1999) |

Battle Magic is the third album by Bal-Sagoth, released in 1998 on Cacophonous Records, and is their last recording for that company before they signed to Nuclear Blast.

The cover artwork for the first release of the album features the fantasy character "Caylen-Tor", created by Bal-Sagoth vocalist/lyricist Byron Roberts. The character was originally introduced in the lyrics of the band's previous album Starfire Burning Upon the Ice-Veiled Throne of Ultima Thule and would later appear in "The Chronicles of Caylen-Tor" series of novels written by Roberts and published by American Sword and sorcery publishing house DMR Books.

The song "When Rides the Scion of the Storms" marks the debut of Byron Roberts' character Captain Caleb Blackthorne, a privateer of the Elizabethan era, who would later appear in a trilogy of short stories written by Roberts and published by DMR Books in the "Swords of Steel" anthology series and subsequent omnibus edition.

The song "Thwarted by the Dark (Blade of the Vampyre Hunter) marks the debut of Byron Roberts' character Joachim Blokk, a 19th century adventurer who would later appear in a short story written by Roberts published in the Sword and sorcery anthology paperback "Devil's Armory", released by Barbwire Butterfly Books.

The band were awarded one full month to record, much of which was spent on the orchestral arrangements. The keyboards in "Blood Slakes the Sand at the Circus Maximus" alone took six full days to complete. The opening of "Blood Slakes the Sand at the Circus Maximus" is identical to the score for the film Spartacus, composed by Alex North.

On 16 September 2016, Battle Magic was reissued on CD by Cacophonous Records, featuring remastered audio, an expanded lyric booklet and new cover artwork.

On 15 September 2026, the album was reissued on CD, cassette and LP by the German label Darkness Shall Rise Productions under license from Cacophonous Records. The reissue featured remastered audio and an expanded lyric booklet. This reissue marked the album's long-awaited debut on vinyl.

== Track listing ==
All songs composed by Byron Roberts and Jonny and Chris Maudling.

| No. | Title | Length |
|---|---|---|
| 1. | "Battle Magic" | 2:45 |
| 2. | "Naked Steel (The Warrior's Saga)" | 4:44 |
| 3. | "A Tale from the Deep Woods" | 5:36 |
| 4. | "Return to the Praesidium of Ys" | 6:29 |
| 5. | "Crystal Shards" | 2:17 |
| 6. | "The Dark Liege of Chaos Is Unleashed at the Ensorcelled Shrine of A'zura-Kai (The Splendour of a Thousand Swords Gleaming Beneath the Blazon of the Hyperborean Empire, Part II)" | 4:14 |
| 7. | "When Rides the Scion of the Storms" | 6:16 |
| 8. | "Blood Slakes the Sand at the Circus Maximus" | 8:53 |
| 9. | "Thwarted by the Dark (Blade of the Vampyre Hunter)" | 6:18 |
| 10. | "And Atlantis Falls..." | 2:22 |
| Total length: | | 49:54 |

== Personnel ==
- Byron Roberts – vocals
- Chris Maudling – guitars, bass
- Jonny Maudling – drums, keyboards

=== Additional personnel ===
- Mags – producer, engineering
- Jeroen van Valkenburg – artwork (inner inlay)
- J.C. Dhien – photography
- Simon Lee – artwork (first release)
- Martin Hanford – artwork (rerelease)
