= Hatheg-Kla =

Hatheg-Kla may refer to:

- a fictional mountain in the story "The Other Gods" by H. P. Lovecraft
- a song by the heavy metal band Bal-Sagoth from their 1995 debut album A Black Moon Broods Over Lemuria
