= The Revelations of Zang =

2013 collection of short stories by John R. Fultz

- Cover of first edition
- Author: John R. Fultz
- Cover artist: Josh Finney
- Language: English
- Genre: Fantasy
- Publisher: Fantastic Books
- Publication date: 2013
- Publication place: United States
- Media type: print (paperback), ebook
- Pages: 254
- ISBN: 978-1-61720-941-3
- OCLC: 1054373131

The Revelations of Zang: Twelve Tales of the Continent is a collection of dark fantasy short stories by American author John R. Fultz. It was first published in trade paperback by Fantastic Books in September 2013, with a new edition issued by the same publisher in August 2018. An ebook edition was issued by 01 Publishing in August 2013. It was reissued in hardcover, trade paperback and ebook by Rogues in the House Presents in January 2023. The 2023 edition includes a new foreword by S. E. Lindberg.

== Summary ==
The book collects the twelve linked short stories of the author's Zang Cycle, five previously published and seven appearing for the first time in the collection. The previously published stories were revised for book publication. All are set in the fictional continent and world of Zang, where the Sorcerer Kings displaced the Lost Gods from the Golden City of Narr a century ago, and now rule it through magic and terror. Writer Artifice the Quill, having fallen afoul of the tyrants on account of his book The End of Sorcery, flees the city to join Mordeau's Glimmer Faire, a troop of traveling performers. The tales alternate between the adventures of Artifice and the vengeful trickster Taizo the Rogue as doomed Narr is threatened by the return of the Lost Gods, the enchanted contraband of the folk of the Red Isle and the supernatural expansion of the ancient Zang Forest to envelope and smother the lands of man. The cycle culminates in the previously unpublished tale "Spilling the Blood of the World."

== Contents ==
- "The Persecution of Artifice the Quill" (from Weird Tales v. 61, no. 3, May/June 2006)
- "Oblivion Is the Sweetest Wine" (from Black Gate v. 2, no. 6, summer 2008)
- "The Liberation of Lady Veronique"
- "When the Glimmer Faire Came to the City of the Lonely Eye" (from Black Gate Online, 2013)
- "The Rebirth of Zang (The Travails of Treons and Tyriel)"
- "The Doom of the Black "
- "The Bountiful Essence of the Empty Hand"
- "What Grows in the Season of Sorcery?"
- "Treasures of the Prophet"
- "Return of the Quill" (from Black Gate v. 3, no. 1, spring 2009)
- "Spilling the Blood of the World"
- "The Vintages of Dream" (from Black Gate v. 3, no. 3, spring 2011)

== Reception ==
The 2023 edition was reviewed by S. E. Lindberg on blackgate.com.

== Relation to other works ==
Fultz has published three other stories set in the same world or universe as The Revelations of Zang, but which are not part of the Zang cycle; "Where the White Lotus Grows" (Monk Punk, 2011), "Yael of the Strings" (Shattered Shields, Nov. 2014), and "The Penitence of the Blade" (The Audient Void no. 2, Oct. 2016). All three are included in his collection Worlds Beyond Worlds: The Short Fiction of John R. Fultz (Apr. 2021).
