= Starfire Burning Upon the Ice-Veiled Throne of Ultima Thule =

Studio album by Bal-Sagoth
- Released: November 25, 1996
- Recorded: August 1996 at Academy Studios, Yorkshire, England
- Genre: Symphonic black metal
- Length: 52:37
- Label: Cacophonous
- Producers: Mags, Bal-Sagoth

Bal-Sagoth chronology
| A Black Moon Broods Over Lemuria (1995) | Starfire Burning Upon the Ice-Veiled Throne of Ultima Thule (1996) | Battle Magic (1998) |

Starfire Burning Upon the Ice-Veiled Throne of Ultima Thule is Bal-Sagoth's second full-length album, released in November 1996 through Cacophonous Records. As with the first album, the band only had around two weeks to record this album. They had major problems with recording the album: the temperature in the recording studio was so consistently high that the recording equipment broke down several times; and the record company, Cacophonous Records, refused to pay for new tape reels to record on, so the band had to actually record over the first album.

The cover artwork for the album is a painting by the famed artist Joe Petagno, based on a concept by Bal-Sagoth vocalist/lyricist Byron Roberts.

This album marks the debut of vocalist/lyricist Byron Roberts' character "Caylen-Tor", the protagonist of the song "To Dethrone the Witch-Queen of Mytos K'unn (The Legend of the Battle of Blackhelm Vale)". Roberts would later go on to write a series of novels featuring this character ("The Chronicles of Caylen-Tor"), published by the American Sword and sorcery publishing house DMR Books.

In the song titled "And Lo, When the Imperium Marches Against Gul-Kothoth, then Dark Sorceries Shall Enshroud the Citadel of the Obsidian Crown", a strong synthesizer melody begins at 4:17. This melody is a variation upon the melody heard in the 1982 film Conan the Barbarian during the scene inside Thulsa Doom's stronghold, composed by Basil Poledouris. Again from the score of Conan the Barbarian, at 00:37 in the track "Recovery", the theme seems to be faithfully adapted by Bal-Sagoth in the track "In the Raven-Haunted Forests of Darkenhold, Where Shadows Reign and the Hues of Sunlight Never Dance" at 2:02. The band explains their inspiration came mainly from John Williams and Basil Poledouris' scores amongst others.

On 13 May 2016 the album was re-released by Cacophonous Records as a special edition CD featuring remastered audio, expanded lyric booklet, new sleeve notes and exclusive new artwork.

In 2021, it was elected by Metal Hammer as the 16th best symphonic metal album of all time.

On 15 September 2026, the album was reissued on CD, cassette and LP by the German label Darkness Shall Rise Productions under license from Cacophonous Records, featuring remastered audio and an expanded lyric booklet. This reissue marked the album's long-awaited debut on vinyl, in time for the 30th anniversary of its initial release in 1996.

== Track listing ==
All songs written and composed by Byron Roberts and Jonny and Chris Maudling.

| No. | Title | Length |
|---|---|---|
| 1. | "Black Dragons Soar Above the Mountain of Shadows (Prologue)" | 3:05 |
| 2. | "To Dethrone the Witch-Queen of Mytos K'unn (The Legend of the Battle of Blackhelm Vale)" | 6:45 |
| 3. | "As the Vortex Illumines the Crystalline Walls of Kor-Avul-Thaa" | 6:35 |
| 4. | "Starfire Burning Upon the Ice-Veiled Throne of Ultima Thule" | 7:23 |
| 5. | "Journey to the Isle of Mists (Over the Moonless Depths of Night-Dark Seas)" | 1:11 |
| 6. | "The Splendour of a Thousand Swords Gleaming Beneath the Blazon of the Hyperborean Empire" | 6:03 |
| 7. | "And Lo, When the Imperium Marches Against Gul-Kothoth, Then Dark Sorceries Shall Enshroud the Citadel of the Obsidian Crown (Episode: VIII)" | 6:28 |
| 8. | "Summoning the Guardians of the Astral Gate" | 6:09 |
| 9. | "In the Raven-Haunted Forests of Darkenhold, Where Shadows Reign and the Hues of Sunlight Never Dance" | 6:29 |
| 10. | "At the Altar of the Dreaming Gods (Epilogue)" | 2:29 |
| Total length: | | 52:37 |

== Personnel ==
- Byron Roberts – vocals, cover concept, logo
- Chris Maudling – guitar, bass
- Jonny Maudling – keyboards, drums

=== Additional personnel ===
- Joe Petagno - cover art
- Mags - producer, engineering
