= Silver Surfer =

Marvel Comics character

- Silver Surfer, as he appears on the cover of Silver Surfer #1 (February 2011). Art by Carlo Pagulayan.

Publication information
- Publisher: Marvel Comics
- First appearance: The Fantastic Four #48 (March 1966)
- Created by: Stan Lee (writer); Jack Kirby (artist)

In-story information
- Alter ego: Norrin Radd
- Species: Zenn-Lavian
- Place of origin: Zenn-La
- Team affiliations: Heralds of Galactus; United Front; Defenders; The Order; Star Masters; God Squad; Annihilators
- Partnerships: Fantastic Four
- Abilities: Endowed with the Power Cosmic, granting him: Superhuman strength and durability; Flight with surfboard; Can travel at superluminal speed; Energy and matter manipulation; Time travel via superluminal speed; Telekinesis; Telepathy; Intangibility; Inter-dimensional travel; Invisibility; Pocket universe creation; Illusion casting via telepathy; Cosmic senses

The Silver Surfer is a superhero appearing in American comic books published by Marvel Comics. He also appears in a number of movies, television, and video game adaptations. The character was created by Stan Lee and Jack Kirby and first appeared in the comic book Fantastic Four #48, published in 1966.

The Silver Surfer is a humanoid alien with metallic skin who can travel through space with the aid of his surfboard-like craft. Originally a young astronomer named Norrin Radd on the planet Zenn-La, he saves his homeworld from the planet devourer Galactus by serving as his herald. Imbued in return with some portion of Galactus's Power Cosmic, he acquires vast power, a new body and a surfboard-like craft on which he can travel faster than light.

Now known as the Silver Surfer, he roams the cosmos searching for planets for Galactus to consume. When his travels take him to Earth, he meets the Fantastic Four, who helps him rediscover his nobility of spirit. Betraying Galactus, he saves Earth but is exiled there as punishment. In the alternate continuity of Earth X and Universe X, Shalla-Bal, Norrin's lover and the empress of Zenn-La, joins him as a second Silver Surfer, both serving as the twin heralds of the second Galactus Franklin Richards.

IGN ranked the Silver Surfer 41st in its "Top 100 Comic Heroes" list in 2011. The Silver Surfer was portrayed by Doug Jones and voiced by Laurence Fishburne in the 2007 film Fantastic Four: Rise of the Silver Surfer

== Publication history ==
Created by Stan Lee and Jack Kirby, the character first appears in The Fantastic Four #48 (March 1966), the first of a three-issue arc that fans call "The Galactus Trilogy".

=== Creation ===
Jack Kirby commented on the character's creation during an interview, stating "My conception of the Silver Surfer was a human being from space in that particular form. He came in when everybody began surfing—I read about it in the paper. The kids in California were beginning to surf. I couldn't do an ordinary teenager surfing so I drew a surfboard with a man from outer space on it."

Kirby further elaborated on the narrative role the character was created as "My inspirations were the fact that I had to make sales and come up with characters that were no longer stereotypes. In other words, I couldn't depend on gangsters, I had to get something new. For some reason I went to the Bible, and I came up with Galactus. And there I was in front of this tremendous figure, who I knew very well because I've always felt him. I certainly couldn't treat him in the same way I could any ordinary mortal. And I remember in my first story, I had to back away from him to resolve that story. The Silver Surfer is, of course, the fallen angel. When Galactus relegated him to Earth, he stayed on Earth, and that was the beginning of his adventures."

=== Early appearances ===
The Silver Surfer debuted as an unplanned addition to the superhero-team comic Fantastic Four #48 (March 1966). The comic's writer-editor, Stan Lee, and its penciller and co-plotter, Jack Kirby, had, by the mid-1960s, developed a collaborative technique known as the "Marvel Method": the two would discuss story ideas, Kirby working from a brief synopsis to draw the individual scenes and plot details, with Lee finally adding the dialogue and captions. When Kirby turned in his pencil art for the story, he included a new character he and Lee had not discussed. As Lee recalled in 1995, "There, in the middle of the story we had so carefully worked out, was a nut on some sort of flying surfboard". He later expanded on this, recalling, "I thought, 'Jack, this time you've gone too far'". Kirby explained that the story's agreed-upon antagonist, a god-like cosmic predator of planets named Galactus, should have some sort of herald, and that he created the surfboard "because I'm tired of drawing spaceships!" Taken by the noble features of the new character, who turned on his master to help defend Earth, Lee overcame his initial skepticism and began adding characterization. The Silver Surfer soon became a key part of the unfolding story.

Following the Surfer's debut, Lee and Kirby brought him back as a recurring guest in Fantastic Four #55–61, 72, and 74–77 (ranging Oct. 1966 – Aug. 1968). The character made his solo debut in the backup story of Fantastic Four Annual #5 (Nov. 1967).

Beginning in August 1968, Lee launched the solo title The Silver Surfer. John Buscema was penciller for the first 17 issues of the series, with Kirby returning for the 18th and final issue. The first seven issues, which included anthological "Tales of the Watcher" backup stories, were 72-page (with advertising), 25-cent "giants", as opposed to the typical 36-page, 12-cent comics of the time. Thematically, the stories dealt with the Surfer's exile on Earth and the inhumanity of man as observed by this noble yet fallen hero. Though short-lived, the series became known as one of Lee's most thoughtful and introspective works.

Following his series' cancellation, the Surfer made sporadic appearances as a guest star or antagonist in such comic books as Thor, The Defenders, and Fantastic Four. Lee remained partial to the Surfer, even asking other writers not to use him as a general rule, and with Kirby collaborated on a seminal 1978 graphic novel starring the character, the only original story featured in the Marvel Fireside Books series.

=== Subsequent series ===
After a 1982 one-shot by writer-artist John Byrne (with scripting by Stan Lee), the Surfer appeared in his second solo ongoing title in 1987.

Initially written by Steve Englehart, the series was to be set on Earth and one issue was completed under this premise before Marvel agreed to let Englehart remove the long-standing restriction regarding Silver Surfer being imprisoned on Earth. This first issue was shelved and a brand new first issue was written, to set up this plot twist; the original first issue would ultimately be reprinted in Marvel Fanfare #51. The series marked the first Silver Surfer stories not written by Stan Lee, a fact which Lee was openly unhappy about. He explained:

After I gave up Spider-Man then someone else did Spider-Man, and someone else did the Fantastic Four and Doctor Strange and the X-Men and all of them. I felt that it was kind of nice for me to have been the only writer of the Silver Surfer, so I felt a little bit disappointed when somebody else did it. I would have liked to have been the only person. Had I known they were absolutely going to have the book done, I would have found the time to do it myself. I didn't really have time but I would have made the time, rather than have anybody else do it. ... this is not at all a criticism of Steve [Englehart] or of Marshall [Rogers, artist on the series], it's just that it's one book that I would have liked to have always done myself. [emphases in original]

Englehart introduced many villains for Silver Surfer, as well as featured space politics involving Surfer's homeworld Zenn-La, which was caught in the middle of a renewed Kree–Skrull War. However, issues regarding Englehart wanting to use his Avengers character Mantis as Silver Surfer's companion, as well as editorial refusing to let him use Thanos or other concepts conceived by Jim Starlin, led Englehart to leave the book with issue #31. Starlin took over as writer with issue #34 after several fill-in issues, and incorporated Thanos, Adam Warlock, and Drax the Destroyer into the series.

Under Jim Starlin and later Ron Marz, the series would receive acclaim and sales boost due to Silver Surfer's involvement with Starlin's Infinity Trilogy, with George Pérez and J. M. DeMatteis also having brief writing stints on the series as well. Additional artists included Tom Grindberg, Ron Garney, and Jon J. Muth, as well as periodic guest spots by John Buscema. The title experienced great initial success which allowed Marvel to push the character into other media, including a 1990 video game, 1992 trading card set, and 1998 animated series, as well as spinning off a variety of other comics series including Cosmic Powers, Cosmic Powers Unlimited, Captain Marvel vol. 2, and Star Masters. It ran 146 issues, through 1998. The next year it was followed by the two-issue miniseries, Silver Surfer: Loftier Than Mortals.

A two-issue Silver Surfer miniseries (later collected as Silver Surfer: Parable), scripted by Lee and drawn by Moebius, was published through Marvel's Epic Comics imprint in 1988 and 1989. Because of inconsistencies with other stories, it has been argued that these stories actually feature an alternate Silver Surfer from a parallel Earth. This miniseries won the Eisner Award for best finite/limited series in 1989.

=== 2000s ===
A new ongoing Silver Surfer series began in 2003, focusing on the character's alien nature and messianic allegory. It lasted 14 issues. The Surfer later appeared in an issue of Cable & Deadpool and has been reunited three times with the superhero group the Defenders. In 2006–2007, he starred in the four-issue miniseries Annihilation: Silver Surfer and co-starred in the miniseries Heralds of Galactus, both part of the Annihilation fictional crossover.

In 2007, the Silver Surfer starred in a four-issue miniseries Silver Surfer: Requiem by writer J. Michael Straczynski and artist Esad Ribic. The first issue was released May 30, 2007 to coincide with the character's first movie appearance. Published under the Marvel Knights imprint, Silver Surfer: Requiem portrays the character upon learning that he is dying as the silver shell he is encased in is deteriorating.

This was followed by the four-issue miniseries Silver Surfer: In Thy Name, by writer Simon Spurrier and artist Tan Eng Huat.

After an appearance in the "Planet Hulk" storyline in 2006, the Surfer was featured in its spin-off series starring the Hulk's son Skaar in 2008, both written by Greg Pak.

=== 2010s ===
The Silver Surfer received a sixth volume, an eponymous 5-issue miniseries written by Pak, debuting in February 2011. He was also a core cast member in The Thanos Imperative (2010), Annihilators (2011), and Fear Itself: The Deep (2011). Beginning in 2011, the Silver Surfer began appearing regularly in The Mighty Thor and a new volume of Defenders, both written by Matt Fraction.

In March 2014, Silver Surfer volume 7 began as part of All-New Marvel NOW! by writer Dan Slott, artist Mike Allred, and colorist Laura Allred. In January 2016 Silver Surfer volume 8 began with a special 50th-anniversary edition expected release in March 2016.

In 2019, a 5-part mini-series titled Silver Surfer: Black was released featuring art from Tradd Moore in collaboration with writing from Donny Cates. The series is an extension of a Guardians of the Galaxy storyline in which the Surfer was sucked into a black hole and ejected into unfamiliar space territory. This run follows the Surfer as he traverses the spaceways on a journey back home.

=== 2020s ===
Silver Surfer later plays an important role in King in Black storyline. With the help from Hugin and Munin, Surfer helps Enigma Force to enter Earth and chose Eddie Brock/Venom as a temporary Captain Universe, to aid his fellow heroes against Knull and his army.

== Fictional character biography ==
Norrin Radd is from the utopian planet Zenn-La, in the Deneb star system of the Milky Way galaxy. He is the son of Jartran and Elmar Radd, and he has a half-brother, Fennan Radd. Zenn-La's ancient and significantly advanced civilization has lost the will to strive or explore, leaving the young scholar Norrin Radd restless and yearning for adventure. Facing the destruction of his world by planet-consuming Galactus, Radd bargains with the cosmic being. In return for the safety of Zenn-La and his lover, Shalla-Bal, Radd pledges to serve as his herald, seeking out planets for the world-devourer to consume. Galactus endows him with a portion of the Power Cosmic, transforming him into the Silver Surfer. Radd had intended to lead Galactus to uninhabited planets, but Galactus tampers with his soul to prevent this.

Radd serves Galactus for an unspecified amount of time. Eventually, the Surfer summons his master to Earth. Here the Surfer meets the Fantastic Four and Alicia Masters. Touched by their nobility, he rebels against Galactus, who is eventually driven off. Before he leaves, he confines the Surfer to Earth with an invisible barrier that affects only him.

During his exile, the Surfer fights numerous villains, including Doctor Doom, who wants his Power Cosmic, and Mephisto, who wants his soul. The Surfer's only ally during these trials is physicist Al B. Harper, who eventually sacrifices himself to save the world from the Stranger.

Banding together with the Hulk and Namor during these wanderings, the Surfer forms the "Titans Three", a group dedicated to battling evil on Earth. Soon, Doctor Strange joins the group, which becomes the Defenders. Surfer stays with them for a while, but his overwhelming desire to be free of Earth and his frequent collisions with Galactus's energy-draining barrier eventually drives him to leave the group.

The Surfer finally pierces Galactus's barrier with the aid of Reed Richards and temporarily escapes Earth. He discovers, though, that his homeworld has been ravaged by Galactus and Shalla-Bal has been abducted by Mephisto and taken to Earth. Even though it means trapping himself once more, the Surfer returns to Earth to battle and defeat Mephisto. Before being vanquished, Mephisto sends Shalla-Bal back to Zenn-La, but the Surfer manages to endow her with a portion of his Power Cosmic, which she uses to revitalize the plant life of their ravaged homeworld.

After the Surfer aids the Fantastic Four against Galactus's latest herald Terrax, the Surfer eventually pierces Galactus's barrier by acting on a suggestion of trying to pass through on a spaceship instead of via his own power on his surfboard. He also makes peace with Galactus by rescuing current herald Nova from the Skrulls. Galactus declares the Surfer's exile ended. The Surfer immediately revisits his homeworld, but Shalla-Bal, in his absence, had become empress of the rejuvenated Zenn-La and is unable to renew their romance.

Embroiled in fresh hostilities between the interstellar Kree and Skrull empires, the Surfer also intervenes in a series of plots by the Elders of the Universe, who plan to become supremely powerful by destroying Galactus and the universe with him. The Surfer thwarts this plot with the aid of his new love interest, Mantis, the Earth-born cosmic heroine also known as the "Celestial Madonna". She seems to die in the process, and although she eventually returns, she never fully renews their romance. After this loss, a grief-stricken Surfer turns to Nova and romantic feelings begin to develop between them. The Surfer's influence gradually leads Nova to question the morality of her role as herald to Galactus. Eventually replaced by the far more ruthless Morg, Nova dies in a conflict between the new herald and the Surfer and the other ex-heralds.

The Surfer repeatedly battles space-born menaces, the chief of whom is Thanos, who attempts to kill half the life in the universe using the omnipotent Infinity Gauntlet. Through Thanos, the Surfer learns how Galactus had altered his soul. He convinces Galactus to restore it, but once Galactus has done so, the Surfer is overcome with grief until he is able to forgive himself. The Surfer finds interstellar allies in Adam Warlock's Infinity Watch and the "Star Masters" team, and he begins attending occasional Defenders reunions.

The Surfer returns home to Zenn-La to find that the planet has vanished, and learns it was actually destroyed in the 1940s (Earth time) by the entity known as the Other. Zenn-La and its people which the Surfer repeatedly encountered since leaving Galactus's service were actually reproductions, created by Galactus so that the Surfer would have a home to return to. Losing his capacity for emotion again, the Surfer returns to Earth. He later regains his personality during a time-travel adventure and sharing a romance with Alicia Masters. The two ultimately part as friends after many adventures together.

Silver Surfer temporarily bonds with and is controlled by the Carnage symbiote, which is seeking revenge for the destruction of its homeworld.

Later, the Surfer works with the alien Annunaki race to gather and protect some of Earth's most extraordinarily gifted children. In the end, one of these children, Ellie Waters, saves Earth from the godlike Marduk entity, preventing the Apocalypse and reordering reality as if the Marduk crisis had never happened (though Ellie alone apparently retains her memories of these events). The Surfer resumes his interstellar wanderings, but promises to be ready to aid his adopted homeworld should Earth ever need him.

During his travels, the Surfer is captured by a portal of the Sakaar empire. Left weakened and vulnerable by his trip through the portal, the Surfer is subdued and implanted with an obedience disk to ensure he remains loyal to them. Fighting as a gladiator (and believed to be the fabled 'Sakaarson' due to his appearance), the Surfer is finally forced to face the Hulk along with his Warbound. Through teamwork and distraction, the Hulk is eventually able to destroy the Surfer's obedience disk. The Hulk and several other slaves and gladiators are freed when the Surfer uses the Power Cosmic to remove their own obedience disks and give them a way out of the arena, although the Hulk declines the Surfer's offer to take him back to Earth.

During the Annihilation war, the Silver Surfer again becomes Galactus's herald to help save the universe from the despot Annihilus. Annihilus captures them and gives them to Thanos for experimentation. Drax the Destroyer frees the Surfer, who in turn frees Galactus. An enraged Galactus destroys more than half the Annihilation Wave, and Annihilus is defeated. Later, the Surfer is joined as herald by Stardust, a former herald the Surfer had replaced.

The Silver Surfer leads Galactus to the populated planet Orbucen, which brings him into conflict with Richard Rider. He delays the planetary destruction to give the inhabitants more time to evacuate.

The Silver Surfer returns to Sakaar in a plan to feed Galactus with the unique "Old Power" which he claims would sate his master's hunger for thousands of years, sparing many other inhabited worlds. He is opposed by the Hulk's son Skaar and is enslaved by an obedience disc. The conflict is ended when Skaar's mother Caiera sacrifices her soul and Old Power as sustenance for Galactus. Unfortunately, Galactus now seems addicted to the Old Power and has begun searching for other planets containing it to sate himself.

After an encounter with the High Evolutionary, the Silver Surfer and Galactus battled Thor and the Asgardians. The battle ended when the Silver Surfer chose to leave his post as herald and guard an Asgardian artifact. Galactus "tethers" him to Asgard's location in Oklahoma, resulting in his powers waning the further he travels from Asgard, and grants him the ability to return to human form.

During the War with the Serpent, Silver Surfer aids Doctor Strange, Namor, Loa, and Lyra in the liberation of New Atlantis from Attuma, who was transformed into Nerkodd: Breaker of Oceans.

Silver Surfer and Dawn meet Glorian, who plans to rebuild the main universe for the heroes to return to after they finish in Battleworld. Glorian has also enlisted the help of the Shaper of Worlds. Glorian then greeted Silver Surfer and Dawn with a tantalizing offer: ally with the Shaper of Worlds to rebuild the universe that was lost. Dawn agreed to use her memories to restore Earth while Silver Surfer left to restore the rest of the universe, but Silver Surfer unmade Galactus while Dawn unknowingly created another version of Norrin. The Shaper of Worlds is not happy with the changes. Dawn and the Surfer embark on more adventures which culminate in their entering a universe predating the main continuity.

When Silver Surfer was displaced in time, he had an encounter with Knull. Silver Surfer was infected by one of Knull's symbiotes only to be saved by Ego the Living Planet. Gathering the energy from the cosmos, Silver Surfer managed to defeat Knull.

During the "King in Black" storyline, Silver Surfer passes by the planets that were ravaged by Knull. At the advice of Thor, Hugin and Munin summon Silver Surfer to Earth. Silver Surfer arrives to where the Enigma Force is and frees it from the symbiotes. Knull reels in pain and Eddie Brock is chosen to be the new Captain Universe. As Silver Surfer faces off against him, Knull recalls his previous fight against him. Through the God of Light, Silver Surfer assumes a chrome form and turns his surfboard into a sword while Knull transforms his armor into one that would enable him to combat Silver Surfer. As Knull begins to fight Silver Surfer, the members of the Avengers, Fantastic Four, and X-Men charge towards Knull so that they can aid Silver Surfer. Just then, Venom appears, having been transformed into Captain Universe, stating that he will handle Knull for them. With their weapons separated from the battle axe form following Knull's death, Thor and Silver Surfer noted that things will not be back to normal soon.

== Powers and abilities ==
The Silver Surfer wields the Power Cosmic, granting him superhuman strength, endurance, and senses and the ability to absorb and manipulate the universe's ambient energy. The Surfer can navigate through interstellar space and hyperspace, which he can enter after exceeding the speed of light allowing traversing interstellar and intergalactic distances to other galaxies millions and even billions of light years away. He has proven capable of time travel on several occasions and can transport other people through time.

The Surfer sustains himself by converting matter into energy; he does not require food, water, air, or sleep, but occasionally enters a sleep-like meditation to dream. He can survive in nearly any known natural environment, including deep space, hyperspace, black holes and stars. The Surfer can project energy in various forms for offensive and defensive use, including force fields, bolts of cosmic force powerful enough to destroy entire planets, and create black holes. He can utilize the Power Cosmic to augment his superhuman strength to indeterminate levels. The Surfer can heal both himself and other living organisms, though he cannot raise the dead, and he has proven capable of revitalizing and evolving organic life on a planet-wide scale. He can cast illusions, create interdimensional portals to other locations including microverses, manipulate and phase through solid matter, and exercise some level of control over the astral plane. However, using these abilities results in his becoming greatly weakened, making their use limited.

His senses enable him to detect objects and concentrations of energy light years away and to perceive matter and energy in subatomic detail, including life energies of living beings. The Surfer can even see through time, and can achieve limited perception of past and future events in his general vicinity with concentration. He has demonstrated telepathic ability, including mind-reading, and can influence human emotion and sensation.

The Surfer's board is composed of a nearly impervious, cosmically powered silvery material similar to his own skin. The board is mentally linked to the Surfer and moves in response to his mental commands even when he is not in physical contact with it. The board is nearly indestructible, but on the rare occasions it has been damaged or destroyed, the Surfer can repair or recreate it with little effort. The Surfer can attack opponents by directing the board against them, and the board is capable of temporarily absorbing and imprisoning other beings.

When Galactus exiled the Surfer to Earth, his means of imprisonment was linked to the board. When the Surfer and the Fantastic Four realized this, the Surfer put it to the test by leaving the board planet-side and entering space in the Four's spacecraft. Once he was free of Earth, the Surfer remotely converted the board to energy, recalled it to him, and reformed it in space.

The Surfer has displayed the ability to shed his silver skin and revert to his original appearance as Norrin Radd, masking the Power Cosmic and allowing him to be more inconspicuous when needed. In this state, he can properly eat, drink and sleep.

== Other versions ==
=== Earth X ===
An alternate universe version of the Silver Surfer from Earth X appears in Universe X. This version is accompanied by Shalla-Bal, who Franklin Richards / Galactus turned into a second Silver Surfer.

=== Earth-691 ===
An alternate universe version of Norrin Radd from Earth-691 appears in Guardians of the Galaxy #24-25. This version became the Keeper and possesses the quantum bands, which augment his connection to the Power Cosmic. He initially works with the Guardians until he realizes he can use his enhanced powers to satiate Galactus and leaves with him.

=== Exiles ===
An alternate universe version of Norrin Radd from Earth-552 appears in Exiles. This version was a military scientist who accidentally destroyed his world with his greatest invention. Determined to bring it back to existence, he approached Galactus, Restorer of Worlds, and became his herald in exchange for his help. Upon learning Galactus only restores worlds that were destroyed by the Blight, an enraged Radd attempted to kill him for his knowledge. This would eventually lead to him being killed by a cosmically empowered Sabretooth.

=== Green Lantern/Silver Surfer: Unholy Alliances ===
An alternate universe version of the Silver Surfer appears in Green Lantern/Silver Surfer: Unholy Alliances.

=== Marvel Zombies ===
An alternate universe version of the Silver Surfer from Earth-2149 appears in Marvel Zombies #5. Upon coming to Earth, he is attacked and killed by several zombies, who absorb his cosmic powers and go on to kill Galactus to empower themselves further.

=== MC2 ===
An alternate universe version of the Silver Surfer from Earth-982 appears in Last Planet Standing #5. While foiling Galactus's plot to cause a new Big Bang, he merges with him and undoes Galactus's damage.

=== Ruins ===
The corpse of an alternate universe version of the Silver Surfer from Earth-9591 makes a cameo appearance in Ruins #1. This version is theorized to have been driven mad over his ability to survive without oxygen and clawed open his chest to expose his lungs to Earth's atmosphere, only to die from shock.

=== Ultimate Marvel ===
Characters based on the Silver Surfer appear in the Ultimate Marvel imprint. In Ultimate Extinction, a cosmic entity called Gah Lak Tus commands shapeshifting silver humanoid drones capable of manipulating energy, which it uses to trigger mass suicides to reduce a planet's resistance.

In Ultimate Fantastic Four, Reed Richards accidentally mistakes Norrin Radd / the Silver Searcher for a star that he was trying to harness and teleports the latter to Earth, which triggers planet-wide chaos and natural calamities. Radd later reveals he serves Zenn-La's ruler Revka Temerlune Edifex Scyros III, and he had been banished from Zenn-La for destroying the latter's control over the planet. Revka offers to rescind the banishment if Radd gives him Earth. However, Radd joins forces with the Fantastic Four to defeat him. Afterward, Radd leaves to wander the space ways.

"A Silver Surfer" makes a minor appearance in Ultimate X-Men #96, in which he briefly fights Jean Grey / Phoenix.

=== What If? ===
Multiple versions of the Silver Surfer appear in What If?:

- In What If? #25, "What If the Marvel Super-Heroes had lost Atlantis Attacks?", Silver Surfer and Quasar survive an attack by Set before the latter traps himself and Set in the Eye of Agamotto, which the Surfer gives to Uatu for safekeeping.
- In What If? #49, "What If the Silver Surfer Possessed the Infinity Gauntlet?", the Surfer takes the completed Infinity Gauntlet from Thanos and attempts to use it for good. After creating a planet for himself and Shalla-Bal to live on however, he ultimately destroys the gauntlet for fear of its power corrupting him. While he and Shalla-Bal are presumed dead, they retire to the planet the Surfer had made.
- In What If? #108, "What If The Avengers Battled The Carnage Cosmic?", the Carnage symbiote bonded to the Silver Surfer before going on a murderous rampage and battling Spider-Man and the Avengers until Firestar disrupts the symbiote's control. Upon learning what Carnage made him do, the Surfer sacrifices himself by flying into the Sun to destroy Carnage.

== In other media ==
=== Television ===
- The Norrin Radd incarnation of the Silver Surfer appears in The Fantastic Four (1967), voiced by Vic Perrin.
- The Norrin Radd incarnation of the Silver Surfer appears in Fantastic Four (1994), voiced by Robin Sachs in the first season and Edward Albert in the series finale "Doomsday".
- The Norrin Radd incarnation of the Silver Surfer appears in a self-titled TV series, voiced by Paul Essiembre.
- The Norrin Radd incarnation of the Silver Surfer appears in The Super Hero Squad Show, voiced by Mikey Kelley. This version speaks with a "surfer dude" accent. In the first season, he serves as a member of the titular Super Hero Squad and temporary member of the Defenders before returning to space to guard the Infinity Sword. In the second season, he is corrupted by the Sword's power, became the Dark Surfer, steals the Infinity Gems and Gauntlet from Thanos, and uses their power to destroy two-thirds of the universe, send Earth away from the sun, and scatter the Super Hero Squad across the multiverse. Eventually, the squad reunite, restore the Earth to its proper place, and defeat the Dark Surfer, purifying him and shattering the Infinity Gauntlet, Gems, and Sword into Infinity Fractals. Following this, the Silver Surfer promises to return to the squad once he pays his debt to the universe.
- The Norrin Radd incarnation of the Silver Surfer appears in the Hulk and the Agents of S.M.A.S.H. episode "Fear Itself", voiced by Brent Spiner.

=== Film ===
- In 1989, Erik Fleming, then a film student from the USC School of Cinematic Arts, and Robert Letterman approached Marvel Studios and Constantin Film's producer Bernd Eichinger to ask permission to make a short film featuring the Silver Surfer as a proof of concept for the use of CGI in creating a realistic silver-colored human figure. Supervised by Steven Robiner, this five-minute short film was completed in 1991 not long after the release of Terminator 2: Judgment Day, which also featured a similarly rendered character, and premiered at First Look USC Film Festival on September 21, 1993. This led to significant interest from major studios in a feature-length Silver Surfer project. Andrew Kevin Walker wrote a script for 20th Century Fox in 2000, but nothing ever came of it.
- The Norrin Radd incarnation of the Silver Surfer appears in Fantastic Four: Rise of the Silver Surfer, portrayed by Doug Jones and voiced by Laurence Fishburne. This version's board serves as the source of his powers and as a beacon for Galactus.
  - In 2007, 20th Century Fox hired J. Michael Straczynski to write the screenplay for a spin-off film. Straczynski said his script was a sequel, but would also delve into the Silver Surfer's origins. In mid-2009, Straczynski expressed doubts that the spin-off would be produced.
- In February 2018, it was reported that 20th Century Fox was developing a Silver Surfer solo film with writer Brian K. Vaughan working on a script. In March 2019, Disney acquired 20th Century Fox, resulting in the character's film rights reverting to Marvel Studios. In September 2019, The GWW reported that Marvel Studios was developing the solo film.

=== Video games ===
- The Norrin Radd incarnation of the Silver Surfer appears in a self-titled video game.
- Evil clones of the Silver Surfer appear in Marvel Super Heroes in War of the Gems.
- The Norrin Radd incarnation of the Silver Surfer appears as a non-player character (NPC) and an unlockable character in Marvel: Ultimate Alliance, voiced by Chris Cox.
- The Norrin Radd incarnation of the Silver Surfer appears in the Fantastic Four: Rise of the Silver Surfer tie-in game, voiced by Brian Bloom.
- The Norrin Radd incarnation of the Silver Surfer appears as a playable character in Marvel Super Hero Squad, voiced again by Mikey Kelley.
- The Norrin Radd incarnation of the Silver Surfer appears as an NPC in and the final boss of Marvel Super Hero Squad: The Infinity Gauntlet, voiced again by Mikey Kelley.
- Norrin Radd as the Silver and Dark Surfer appear as playable characters in Marvel Super Hero Squad Online, voiced again by Mikey Kelley.
- The Norrin Radd incarnation of the Silver Surfer makes a cameo appearance in Zero's ending in Marvel vs. Capcom 3: Fate of Two Worlds.
- The Norrin Radd incarnation of the Silver Surfer appears in Pinball FX 2 via the Fantastic Four table.
- The Norrin Radd incarnation of the Silver Surfer appears in Lego Marvel Super Heroes, voiced by James Arnold Taylor.
- The Norrin Radd incarnation of the Silver Surfer appeared as a playable character in Marvel Heroes before he was removed on July 1, 2017 for legal reasons.
- The Norrin Radd incarnation of the Silver Surfer appears as a playable character in Marvel Contest of Champions.
- The Norrin Radd and Shalla-Bal incarnations of the Silver Surfer appear as a playable characters in Marvel: Future Fight.
- The Norrin Radd incarnation of the Silver Surfer and his board appear as purchasable cosmetics in Fortnite Battle Royale.
- The Norrin Radd incarnation of the Silver Surfer appears in Marvel Snap.
- The Norrin Radd incarnation of the Silver Surfer appears as a playable character in Marvel Cosmic Invasion, voiced again by Brian Bloom.

=== Books ===
- The Norrin Radd incarnation of the Silver Surfer was the subject of an anthology of short prose fiction stories titled The Ultimate Silver Surfer, edited by Stan Lee and published by Berkley (October 1997, softcover, 306 pages, ISBN 978-1-57297-299-5). This book, among others, pre-dated Marvel's use of the "Ultimate" brand name in comics.
- The Norrin Radd incarnation of the Silver Surfer appears in the prose fiction novel Fantastic Four: Redemption of the Silver Surfer, by Michael Jan Friedman and also published by Berkley (April 1998, softcover, 260 pages, ISBN 978-0-425-16489-1).
- The Norrin Radd incarnation of the Silver Surfer appears in the Fantastic 4: Rise of the Silver Surfer novelization, by writer Daniel Joseph and published by Pocket Star (April 2007, softcover, 272 pages, ISBN 978-1-4165-4809-6).

=== Music ===
- The Silver Surfer is referenced in the Marc Bolan and T. Rex song "Teenage Dream".
- The Norrin Radd incarnation of the Silver Surfer appears on the cover of the Joe Satriani album Surfing with the Alien. Though Satriani was unfamiliar with the character at the time, the album's production manager suggested the character's usage. Following this, Satriani became inspired by the Silver Surfer's mythos to create "Back to Shalla-Bal" for the Flying in a Blue Dream album and "The Power Cosmic 2000", a two-part song on the Engines of Creation album.
- The British metal band Bal-Sagoth named their fourth album The Power Cosmic and dedicated one song to the Silver Surfer, "The Scourge of the Fourth Celestial Host".

=== Miscellaneous ===
The Norrin Radd incarnation of the Silver Surfer and the cover of the first issue of the 1968 Fantastic Four series appear in a series of commemorative Marvel Comics stamps released by the United States Postal Service in November 2007.

== Merchandise ==
=== Toys ===
The Silver Surfer has appeared in several Marvel-based action figure and toy lines, including one celebrating the 30th anniversary of the character's first appearance, and three based on the 1998 animated series.

- The Silver Surfer is the seventh figurine in the Classic Marvel Figurine Collection.
- Hasbro released the Silver Surfer in its Marvel Universe toyline both individually and included with Marvel Masterworks Galactus. A "clear" variant was released with the "dark" variant of Galactus.
- Silver Surfer appears as a playable character in the "Avengers", "Critical Mass", "Supernova", and "Galactic Guardians" sets of Marvel HeroClix.

=== Trading cards ===
The Silver Surfer starred in his own "all-prism" trading card series in 1993, released by Comics Images.

He has also appeared in many of Marvel's other trading card sets, notably each of the Marvel Universe Cards, Marvel Masterpieces, and Marvel Flair Cards trading card series as well as the Marvel OverPower trading card game.

== Reception ==
The Silver Surfer was ranked as the 47th-greatest comic book character of all time by Wizard magazine. IGN also ranked the Silver Surfer as the 41st-greatest comic book hero quoting that "Silver Surfer has the coolest mode of transportation this side of Ghost Rider, but his powers come with a heavy burden."

The 2014 series was given a negative review by Newsarama's Pierce Lydon, who cites Laura Allred's coloring as the issue's biggest flaw. Iann Robinson, writing for CraveOnline, said the issue misses the point of the Silver Surfer character altogether. ComicBooked writer Cal Cleary gave the issue a perfect score, citing deep characterization and intricate design, praise largely echoed by Comics Alliance's Matt D. Wilson.

In 2018, CBR.com ranked Silver Surfer 5th in their "25 Fastest Characters In The Marvel Universe" list.

== Collected editions ==
The character's various series have been collected into the following books:

- Son of Origins of Marvel Comics includes Silver Surfer #1, 249 pages, softcover, October 1975, Simon & Schuster, ISBN 978-0671221669
- Bring on the Bad Guys: Origins of the Marvel Comics Villains includes Silver Surfer #3, 253 pages, softcover, October 1976, Simon & Schuster, ISBN 978-0671223557
- Marvel's Greatest Superhero Battles includes Silver Surfer vol. 1 #4, 253 pages, softcover, November 1978, Simon & Schuster, ISBN 978-0671243913
- Essential Silver Surfer (b/w)
  - Volume 1 collects Silver Surfer vol. 1 #1–18 and Fantastic Four Annual #5, 528 pages, softcover, February 1998, ISBN 0-7851-2008-4
  - Volume 2 collects Silver Surfer vol. 2 #1, Silver Surfer vol. 3 #1–18, Silver Surfer Annual #1, and Marvel Fanfare #51, 600 pages, softcover, June 2007, ISBN 978-0-7851-2700-0
- Marvel Masterworks: The Silver Surfer
  - Volume 1 collects Silver Surfer vol. 1 #1–6 and Fantastic Four Annual #5, 272 pages, hardcover, June 2003, ISBN 978-0-7851-1187-0
    - Volume 1 collects Silver Surfer vol. 1 #1–6 and Fantastic Four Annual #5, 272 pages, softcover, January 2010, ISBN 978-0785142829
  - Volume 2 collects Silver Surfer #vol. 1 7–18, 280 pages, hardcover, August 2003, ISBN 978-0-7851-1177-1
    - Volume 2 collects Silver Surfer vol. 1 #7–18, 280 pages, softcover, January 2010, ISBN 978-0785145691
- Silver Surfer Omnibus collects Silver Surfer #1–18, Fantastic Four Annual #5, and Not Brand Echh #13, 576 pages, hardcover, June 2007, ISBN 0-7851-2753-4
- John Buscema's Silver Surfer Artist's Edition collects Silver Surfer vol. 1 #5-6 and 8, 144 pages, hardcover, January 2014, IDW Publishing, ISBN 978-1631401459
  - John Buscema's Silver Surfer Artisan Edition collects Silver Surfer vol. 1 #5-6 and 8, 144 pages, softcover, March 2022, IDW Publishing, ISBN 978-1684058853
- Silver Surfer Epic Collection
  - Volume 1: When Calls Galactus collects Fantastic Four vol. 1 #48–50, #55, #57–60, #72, #74–77; material from Tales to Astonish #92–93, Fantastic Four vol. 1 #56, #61, Fantastic Four Annual #5, 320 pages, softcover, December 2014, ISBN 978-0785190028
  - Volume 3: Freedom collects Silver Surfer vol. 2 #1, Silver Surfer vol. 3 #1–14, Super-Villain Classic #1; material from Epic Illustrated #1 and Marvel Fanfare #51, 488 pages, softcover, December 2015, ISBN 978-0785199038
  - Volume 4: Parable collects Silver Surfer vol. 3 #15-23, Silver Surfer Annual #1–2, Fantastic Four #325, Marvel Graphic Novel No. 38 - Silver Surfer: Judgment Day, Silver Surfer vol. 4 #1-2; material from Marvel Comics Presents #1, 488 pages, softcover, April 2022, ISBN 978-1302932329
  - Volume 5: The Return of Thanos collects Silver Surfer vol. 3 #24-38, Silver Surfer: The Enslavers, 480 pages, softcover, December 2022, ISBN 978-1302948290
  - Volume 6: Thanos Quest collects Silver Surfer vol. 3 #39-50, Silver Surfer Annual #3, Thanos Quest #1-2; material from Marvel Comics Presents #50, 480 pages, softcover, May 2018, ISBN 978-1-302-91186-7
  - Volume 7: The Infinity Gauntlet collects Silver Surfer vol. 3 #51-66, Silver Surfer Annual #4; material from Marvel Comics Presents #69, #93-97, 488 pages, softcover, May 2017, ISBN 978-1-302-90711-2
  - Volume 9: Resurrection collects Silver Surfer vol. 3 #76-85, Silver Surfer Annual (1988) #6, Silver Surfer/Warlock: Resurrection (1993) #1-4 and Secret Defenders (1993) #9-10. 456 pages, softcover. ISBN 978-1-302-92507-9
  - Volume 13: Inner Demons collects Silver Surfer vol. 3 #123-138, -1, and Silver Surfer Annual '97, 464 pages, softcover, June 2019, ISBN 978-1302918132
- The Definitive Silver Surfer collects Silver Surfer #1, Silver Surfer vol. 2 #1, Silver Surfer vol. 4 #1–2, Fantastic Four #48–50, Tales to Astonish #92–93 and The Tomb of Dracula #50, 260 pages, softcover, August 2007, Panini Comics, ISBN 1-905239-67-X
- Silver Surfer: Rebirth of Thanos includes Silver Surfer vol. 3 #34–38, 224 pages, softcover, April 2006, ISBN 0-7851-2046-7, hardcover, August 2010, ISBN 0-7851-4478-1
- Thor: Blood and Thunder includes Silver Surfer vol. 3 #86–88, 336 pages, softcover, July 2011, ISBN 978-0-7851-5094-7
- Silver Surfer: Parable collects Silver Surfer vol. 4 #1–2, 72 pages, hardcover, December 1988, ISBN 0-87135-491-8, softcover, 1998, ISBN 0-7851-0656-1
  - Silver Surfer: Parable collects Silver Surfer vol. 4 #1–2 and Silver Surfer: The Enslavers graphic novel, 168 pages, hardcover, May 2012, ISBN 978-0-7851-6209-4
- Silver Surfer: Communion collects Silver Surfer vol. 5 #1–6, 136 pages, softcover, June 2004, ISBN 0-7851-1319-3
- Silver Surfer: Requiem collects Silver Surfer: Requiem #1–4, 104 pages, hardcover, December 2007, ISBN 978-0-7851-2848-9, softcover, July 2008, ISBN 978-0-7851-1796-4
- Silver Surfer: In Thy Name collects Silver Surfer: In Thy Name #1–4, 96 pages, softcover, June 2008, ISBN 978-0-7851-2749-9
- Silver Surfer: Devolution collects Silver Surfer vol. 6 #1–5, 200 pages, softcover, September 2011, ISBN 978-0-7851-5665-9
- Silver Surfer by Dan Slott and Mike Allred:
  - Silver Surfer vol. 1: New Dawn collects Silver Surfer vol. 7 #1–5 and material from All-New Marvel Now! Point One, 128 pages, softcover, November 2014, ISBN 978-0785188780
  - Silver Surfer vol. 2: Worlds Apart collects Silver Surfer vol. 7 #6–10, 120 pages, softcover, June 2015, ISBN 978-0785188797
  - Silver Surfer vol. 3: Last Days collects Silver Surfer vol. 7 #11–15, 120 pages, softcover, November 2015, ISBN 978-0785197379
  - Silver Surfer vol. 4: Citizen of Earth collects Silver Surfer vol. 8 #1-6, 144 pages, softcover, October 2016, ISBN 978-0785199694
  - Silver Surfer vol. 5: A Power Greater Than Cosmic collects Silver Surfer vol. 8 #7-14, 176 pages, softcover, December 2017, ISBN 978-0785199700
  - Silver Surfer By Slott & Allred Omnibus collects Silver Surfer vol. 7 #1-15, Silver Surfer vol. 8 #1-14 and material from All-New Marvel Now! Point One, 688 pages, hardcover, December 2018, ISBN 978-1302913595
- Defenders: The Best Defense includes Silver Surfer: The Best Defense one-shot, 168 pages, softcover, March 2019, ISBN 978-1302916145
- Fantastic Four: Prodigal Sun includes Silver Surfer: Prodigal Sun one-shot, 112 pages, softcover, November 2019, ISBN 978-1302919801
- Silver Surfer: Black Treasury Edition collects Silver Surfer: Black #1-5, 120 pages, softcover, December 2019, ISBN 978-1302917432
  - Silver Surfer: Black collects Silver Surfer: Black #1-5, 120 pages, softcover, October 2020, ISBN 978-1302927844
- Silver Surfer: Rebirth collects Silver Surfer: Rebirth #1-5, 112 pages, softcover, August 2022, ISBN 978-1302932213
