= The Thief of Forthe and Other Stories =

2018 collection of short stories by Clifford Ball

- Cover of first edition
- Author: Clifford Ball
- Cover artist: Virgil Finlay
- Language: English
- Genre: fantasy
- Publisher: DMR Books
- Publication date: 2018
- Publication place: United States
- Media type: print (paperback), ebook
- Pages: 206
- ISBN: 978-0-9909900-4-8

The Thief of Forthe and Other Stories is a collection of sword and sorcery and other fantasy short stories by American writer Clifford Ball. It was first published in paperback and ebook by DMR Books in March 2018.

== Summary ==
The book collects four novelettes and two short stories by the author, together with an introduction by the publisher, D. M. Ritzlin. It gathers together all of Ball's published fiction, originally published in the 1930s and 1940s in Weird Tales, for the first time. The first story, featuring the barbarian adventurer Duar, and the second and third, featuring Rald the thief, were among the earliest sword and sorcery stories published after the pioneering work of Robert E. Howard, and were written in homage to him. The pieces following feature a modern-day quest for the legendary island of Circe, a fantastic detective yarn, and a traditional horror story.

== Contents ==
- "Introduction" (D. M. Ritzlin)
- "Duar the Accursed" (from Weird Tales v. 29, no. 5, May 1937)
- "The Thief of Forthe" (from Weird Tales v. 30, no. 1, Jul. 1937)
- "The Goddess Awakes" (from Weird Tales v. 31, no. 2, Feb. 1938)
- "The Swine of Ææa" (from Weird Tales v. 33, no. 3, Mar. 1939)
- "The Little Man" (from Weird Tales v. 34, no. 2, Aug. 1939)
- "The Werewolf Howls" (from Weird Tales v. 36, no. 2, Nov. 1941)

== Reception ==
Fletcher Vredenburgh, reviewing the collection on blackgate.com, writes "Ball was one of the earliest authors to show that S&S wasn't just something a few specific authors wrote, but an actual genre that anyone else with a heart for it could do." "Ball's stories." he notes, "are the works of someone still finding his feet. They aren't as polished as those of his model, Robert E. Howard [but show he] could have been a solid talent had he continued writing." Vredenburgh finds the Duar story "not-great, but ... pretty darn good with some nice, weird bits," and notes "a lunkheadedness to Rald I found fun." "There's a creative exuberance to these stories that make me wish Ball had carried on," he observes, concluding "Dave Ritzlin has done a tremendous service in getting this book into print."
