= The Empress of Dreams =

2021 book by Tanith Lee

- Cover of first edition
- Author: Tanith Lee
- Cover artist: Lauren Gornik
- Language: English
- Genre: Fantasy
- Publisher: DMR Books
- Publication date: 2021
- Publication place: United States
- Media type: print (paperback), ebook
- Pages: 224
- ISBN: 978-1-735898247

The Empress of Dreams is a collection of fantasy short stories by British author Tanith Lee. It was first published in trade paperback and ebook by DMR Books in February 2021.

== Summary ==
The book collects sixteen short works by the author in the Sword and Sorcery subgenre.

== Contents ==
- "Odds Against the Gods" (from Swords Against Darkness II, Sep. 1977)
- "Sleeping Tiger" (from Dragonbane no. 1, Spring 1978)
- "The Demoness" (from The Year's Best Fantasy Stories: 2, 1976)
- "The Sombrus Tower" (from Weird Tales 2, 1980)
- "Winter White" (from The Year's Best Horror Stories: Series VI, 1978)
- "In the Balance" (from Swords Against Darkness III, 1978)
- "Northern Chess" (from Amazons!, 1979)
- "Southern Lights" (from Amazons II, 1982)
- "Mirage and Magia" (from Hecate's Cauldron, 1982)
- "The Three Brides of Hamid-Dar" (from Arabesques 2, 1989)
- "The Pain of Glass" (from Clockwork Phoenix 2, 2009)
- "These Beasts" (from The Magazine of Fantasy & Science Fiction v. 88, no. 6, June 1995)
- "Two Lions, a Witch, and the War-Robe" (from Swords & Dark Magic: The New Sword and Sorcery, June 2010)
- "A Tower of Arkrondurl" (from Legends: Stories in honour of David Gemmell, Oct. 2013)
- "The Woman in Scarlet" (from Realms of Fantasy v. 6, no. 4, Apr. 2000)
- "Evillo the Uncunning" (from Songs of the Dying Earth: Stories in Honor of Jack Vance, 2009)
