= Clifford Ball =

American fantasy writer

Clifford Nankivell Ball
- Born: January 24, 1908; New York City, U.S.
- Died: January 1947 (aged 38–39); Baltimore, Maryland, U.S.
- Occupation: Writer
- Writing career
- Period: 1937–1941

Clifford Nankivell Ball (January 24, 1908 – January 1947) was an American fantasy writer whose primary distinction was having been one of the earliest post-Howard writers in the sword and sorcery subgenre of fantasy. He wrote as Clifford Ball.

== Literary career ==
Ball's road to pulp writing began in the mid-1920s, when he started reading Weird Tales magazine. As he put it in a 1936 fan letter, "I have been a constant reader of your magazine since 1925, when some author's conception of weirdness was a gigantic ape dragging a half-naked female about a jungle, and I have watched it progress steadily upward to the zenith." He became especially enamored of Robert E. Howard's Conan stories. In the same letter he wrote "I feel moved to offer my condolences upon the death of Mr. Howard. A hundred international Tarzans could never erase the memory of Conan the Cimmerian. Neither Northwest Smith nor Jirel of Joiry—and in [their creator] Moore you have an excellent author—can quite supplant his glory. When I read that Red Nails would be the last of Conan’s exploits I felt as though some sort of income, or expected resource, had been suddenly severed." Besides Howard and Moore, he expressed appreciation in his letters for works of Henry Kuttner, Edmond Hamilton, Robert Bloch, and illustrator Virgil Finlay.

Howard's death moved Ball to attempt writing for Weird Tales himself, and from 1937 to 1941 he contributed six short stories to the pulp magazine, then at its heyday under the editorships of Farnsworth Wright and Dorothy McIlwraith. The setting of the first three is vaguely like Howard's Hyborian Age of warring kingdoms, the first featuring the barbarian adventurer Duar, an amnesiac king protected by a guardian sprite, and the other two Rald, a thief and mercenary. The remaining stories are more conventional fantasies.

Ball's output for Weird Tales appears to have been curtailed by his joining the armed forces in January 1941. The last of his stories to appear was "The Werewolf Howls" in Weird Tales v. 36, no. 2, November 1941.

== Life ==
Clifford Nankivell Ball was born January 24, 1908, in Manhattan, New York City, the son of Howard Hamilton Ball and Emma Vaughn (Nankivell) Ball. They had married January 23, 1907, in Manhattan. Clifford's father was born August 18, 1876 in New York, the son of Madison Monroe Ball and Hester (Secor) Ball. His mother was born September 16, 1874, in Millerstown, Perry County, Pennsylvania, the daughter of Thomas Nankivell, a meat market proprietor, and Martha A. (Vaughn) Nankivell.

Clifford's parents appear to have separated within a few years of their marriage, and by 1910 he and his mother were living with her parents' family in Millerstown. She was working as a seamstress in a shirt factory at the time. Emma Ball later remarried to Asel Bishop Porter, but Clifford continued to live primarily with his grandfather in Millerstown through at least 1930. He was also educated there, completing four years of high school. He then began a rather footloose period, a picturesque look back on which is given in the October 1937 issue of Weird Tales:

This 29-year-old newest sensation of WEIRD TALES has led a life as adventurous as that of either of his two barbarian heroes. He went through high school in Millerstown, Pennsylvania, experiencing great difficulty with his mathematics and with a young and attractive school-teacher of whom he became enamored. After he had been graduated, he took a job in the license bureau of the State Highway Department. A few months later he began to hate the place, and left. The Miami catastrophe of 1927 [sic] occurred, and he and a friend trekked south to Florida, expecting to find heavy salaries waiting for eager workers. The state was "broke;" and tourists, alarmed by the tidal wave, were frightened away. Ball has slung hash, worked on dynamite crews as a capper, fry-cooked, run a dice table in a gambling-house, dug ditches, leveled auto springs, spread cloth in a shirt factory, and served beer in a Virginia tavern. This will always remain in Ball's memory, he says, as the best moments of his life.

Supplementing this account, Ball was back living with his grandfather and working as a laborer in the lumbering industry in 1930, and at some point in the 1930s he attended college, completing one year, He was apparently also married briefly during that decade, as in 1940 he was stated to be divorced. In 1935 he was reported to have been living with his mother and stepfather in Long Island City, Queens, New York, probably in its Astoria neighborhood, from which his late 1930s fan letters to Weird Tales were sent. It was in that residence that his literary career as a pulp writer began in the late 1930s.

Later Ball's mother and stepfather, and he apparently with them, moved to Harrisburg, Dauphin County, Pennsylvania; in April 1940 he resided with them at 629 Geary Street in that city. His work situation was unsettled in that year; he was engaged as a laborer on a W.P.A. project in April, while at another time he was unemployed. By November 29, 1940, he was working in construction for national defense at Camp Meade, Maryland. His address at the time was 403 Annapolis Boulevard, in the Brooklyn neighborhood of Baltimore, Maryland.

In a move that likely put an end to his brief literary career, Ball enlisted in the U.S. Army Air Corps on January 27, 1941, in Baltimore, Maryland. His permanent address at the time was given as Perry County, Pennsylvania. His civil occupation was reported as carpenter. During his military service he served in the A.A.F. 788 Bomb Squad, U.S. Army.

Ball married Jean E. Stewart on January 12, 1943, in Boise, Idaho. She was born in 1906 in Falls City, Nebraska.

On November 21, 1945, his address was 35-16 34th Street, Long Island City, New York.

Clifford Ball died at age 38 in January 1947 in Baltimore, according to a January 16, 1947, obituary. He was buried in Millerstown Riverview Cemetery, Millerstown, Perry County, Pennsylvania.

== Legacy ==
Some of Ball's stories have been reprinted from the 1970s onward, most notably in the Ballantine Adult Fantasy series edited by Lin Carter. All his tales were collected together for the first time in book form in The Thief of Forthe and Other Stories (DMR Books, 2018).

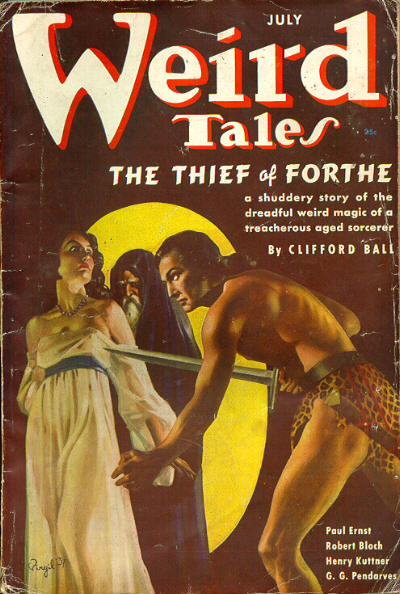
Ball's novelette "The Thief of Forthe" was the cover story in the July 1937 Weird Tales

== Bibliography ==
=== Collections ===
- The Thief of Forthe and Other Stories (2018)

=== Short stories ===
All of Ball's known works were published in Weird Tales, in the issues for the dates indicated.

- "Duar the Accursed" (May 1937; reprinted in New Worlds for Old, edited by Lin Carter (1971)
- "The Thief of Forthe" (July 1937; reprinted in Savage Heroes, edited by Eric Pendragon (1977) and The Barbarian Swordsmen, edited by Sean Richards (1981)
- "The Goddess Awakes" (February 1938; reprinted in Realms of Wizardry, edited by Lin Carter (1976)
- "The Swine of Ææa" (March 1939)
- "The Little Man" (August 1939)
- "The Werewolf Howls" (November 1941; reprinted in 100 Creepy Little Creature Stories, edited by Stefan R. Dziemianowicz, Robert Weinberg and Martin H. Greenberg (1994)
