= Byron Roberts =

British vocalist

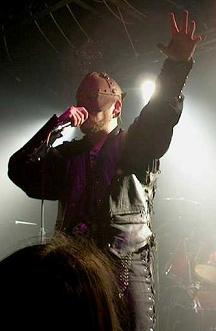
- Roberts with Bal-Sagoth in 2002

Background information
- Also known as: Byron, Lord Byron, Byron A. Roberts
- Origin: Sheffield, England
- Genres: Symphonic metal, black metal, extreme metal
- Occupation(s): Singer, songwriter, author
- Years active: 1988–present
- Member of: Bal-Sagoth
- Website: byron-a-roberts.co.uk

Byron Alexander Roberts is a British musician who is the vocalist/lyricist and a founder of the symphonic extreme metal band Bal-Sagoth. He is also the author of "The Chronicles of Caylen-Tor" book series published by DMR Books, as well as the author of several short stories and poems which have been published in various fantasy and horror fiction anthologies.

Originally hailing from Yorkshire, England, and also holding full Canadian citizenship due to many years spent living in Ontario and Quebec, Roberts graduated from Sheffield Hallam University with an Honours Degree in English, writing his final year thesis on the genres of pulp fantasy, science fiction and horror, and more specifically the works of H.P. Lovecraft. Roberts originated Bal-Sagoth's concept and writes all the lyrics for the band, having performed the vocals on all six Bal-Sagoth albums to date as well as the band's 1993 demo. Roberts also contributed guest vocals to the "Dominion" demo from death metal band Blasphemer, and to the "Halcyon" EP from the doom metal band Solstice.

== Career ==
=== Bal-Sagoth ===
Roberts came up with the idea for the band Bal-Sagoth around 1989. For years, he had been seeking suitable musicians with whom he could collaborate to realise his grand vision of forming "a sublimely symphonic black/death metal band swathed in a concept of dark fantasy/science-fiction and ancient myths & legends." In 1993, after several aborted attempts to launch the project, the formal inception of Bal-Sagoth took place. The band began composing songs, the ultimate result (now some thirty years later) being a six album discography released via Cacophonous Records and Nuclear Blast. For a more extensive account of the band and its releases, see Bal-Sagoth.

=== Short stories and poetry ===
On 21 February 2015 the fantasy anthology paperback Swords of Steel was published by DMR Books. The publication contains a short story by Bal-Sagoth vocalist/lyricist Byron Roberts entitled "Into the Dawn of Storms" which features Byron's character Captain Caleb Blackthorne who first appeared in the lyrics to the third Bal-Sagoth album Battle Magic in 1998.

On 30 July 2015, the fantasy anthology Barbarian Crowns was published by Horrified Press/Barbwire Butterfly Books. This publication contains a short story by Roberts entitled "Chronicles of the Obsidian Crown" which features characters and events from the Bal-Sagoth lyrical canon. The story is part of the "Obsidian Crown Saga" which also features on the Bal-Sagoth albums Starfire Burning Upon the Ice-Veiled Throne of Ultima Thule and The Chthonic Chronicles. On the same day, the fantasy anthology Devil's Armory was also published by Horrified Press. This publication contains a short story by Roberts entitled "Darkfall: Return of the Vampyre Hunter" which features the character Joachim Blokk, who first appeared in the lyrics of the third Bal-Sagoth album Battle Magic. Additionally, a poem by Roberts entitled "When Dead Cthulhu Dreams" was included in the anthology Beyond the Cosmic Veil, also published by Horrified Press.

On 27 February 2016, the fantasy anthology paperback Swords of Steel II was published by DMR Books. This publication contains a short story by Roberts entitled "A Voyage on Benighted Seas", the second installment of the Caleb Blackthorne trilogy which began in the first volume of Swords of Steel.

On 19 May 2017, the fantasy anthology paperback Swords of Steel III was published by DMR Books. This publication contains a short story by Roberts entitled "The Scion at the Gate of Eternity", the third installment of the Caleb Blackthorne trilogy featuring characters from the Bal-Sagoth lyrical canon.

On 18 March 2018 the sword & sorcery anthology Dreams of Fire and Steel was published by Nocturnicorn Books. The book includes a short story by Roberts titled "Caylen-Tor", featuring the character which first appeared in the lyrics of the second Bal-Sagoth album Starfire Burning Upon the Ice-Veiled Throne of Ultima Thule in 1996.

On 14 May 2019 the collection The Chronicles of Caylen-Tor was published by DMR Books. The book consists of three novellas by Byron Roberts featuring the character Caylen-Tor who first appeared in the lyrics of the second Bal-Sagoth album Starfire Burning Upon the Ice-Veiled Throne of Ultima Thule in 1996.

On 13 May 2021, the collection The Chronicles of Caylen-Tor Volume II was published by DMR Books. The book consists of four stories by Byron Roberts featuring his character Caylen-Tor who first appeared in the lyrics of the second Bal-Sagoth album Starfire Burning Upon the Ice-Veiled Throne of Ultima Thule and is a sequel to "The Chronicles of Caylen-Tor".

In February 2024, the collection The Chronicles of Caylen-Tor Volume III was published by DMR Books. The third volume in the series by Byron Roberts consists of three novellas featuring his character Caylen-Tor who first appeared in the lyrics of the second Bal-Sagoth album Starfire Burning Upon the Ice-Veiled Throne of Ultima Thule.

On 07 April 2025, the fantasy anthology paperback "Swords of Steel IV" was published by DMR Books. This publication contains a short story by Byron Roberts entitled "The Shrine of the Six-eyed Avatar", featuring characters and concepts from the Bal-Sagoth lyrical canon.

Roberts also plans to publish a series of Bal-Sagoth related comic books/graphic novels further detailing the extensive stories of the lyrical multiverse, as well as a collection of illustrated prose stories, and even collectible cards featuring his characters.

== Artistry ==
=== Lyrical content and influences ===
Drawing inspiration from such writers as Robert E. Howard, H. P. Lovecraft, Edgar Rice Burroughs, Frank Herbert, J.R.R. Tolkien, Shakespeare, Arthur C. Clarke, Clark Ashton Smith, David Gemmell, George Lucas, Jack Kirby and Stan Lee, Roberts set out to create his own dark and baroque fantasy universe, with tales told through the medium of extreme metal albums. He named the band Bal-Sagoth in honour of one of his primary literary inspirations, the writer Robert E. Howard, whose story "The Gods of Bal-Sagoth" had first appeared in the legendary pulp fantasy magazine Weird Tales during the 1930s. Sometimes dubbed "The Multiverse" and/or "The Omniverse", Roberts's lyrical world is an extensive landscape of fantasy/science fiction, ranging from intergalactic tales of rogue gods and cosmic empires, to historical epics and high adventures, to sword and sorcery style sagas. The stories of the lyrical world are all connected to a greater or lesser degree, and are roughly divided into several different eras. The first era is the "antediluvian" epoch, during which most of the sword & sorcery style stories take place. Tales occurring even earlier than this, such as when the planet Earth consisted of the mega-continent Pangaea, are also usually grouped into this broad chronological categorisation. Then there is an era covering recorded human history from ancient times to roughly the end of World War II, during which Roberts's historical stories occur. Thirdly there is a future era, which roughly dates from the year 2104 all the way to a time frame many thousands of years in the future, and it is during this epoch that the science-fiction oriented stories take place.

Roberts creates all the concepts, storylines, characters, places and lyrics for the Bal-Sagoth lyrics. He also designed the band logo, the album cover concepts, and all the booklet layouts.

=== Vocal style ===
Roberts's original vocal style combines black metal screams with a pitched-down "narrator's" voice, enabling him to relay story elements in a clear and compelling manner, present dialogue between characters, and imbue the vocals with a "light and dark" contrasting feel. Roberts's primary musical inspirations are bands such as Bathory, Celtic Frost, Deicide, Morbid Angel, Sabbat, Slayer, et al.

== Discography ==
Discography (1993–2013)

- Bal-Sagoth Demo (1993)
- A Black Moon Broods Over Lemuria (Cacophonous, 1995)
- Starfire Burning Upon the Ice-Veiled Throne of Ultima Thule (Cacophonous, 1996)
- Battle Magic (Cacophonous, 1998)
- The Power Cosmic (Nuclear Blast, 1999)
- Atlantis Ascendant (Nuclear Blast, 2001)
- The Chthonic Chronicles (Nuclear Blast, 2006)
- Apocryphal Tales (Godreah/Exhumation, 2013)

== Bibliography ==
=== Caylen-Tor series ===
- "Caylen-Tor" (2018)
- "The Siege of Gul-Azlaan" (2019)
- "The Battle of Blackhelm Vale" (2019)
- "The King Beneath the Mountain of Fire" (2019)
- "The Trial of Blood and Steel" (2021)
- "Carnage at the Crimson Stones" (2021)
- "In the Hall of the Wolfborn Liege" (2021)
- "The Devil Beyond the Gate of Shadow" (2021)
- "Lords of the Ensanguined Sea" (2024)
- "The Wolf and the Eldritch Moon" (2024)
- "The Vengeance of the Witch-Queen" (2024)
- The Chronicles of Caylen-Tor (collection) (DMR Books, 2019)
- The Chronicles of Caylen-Tor, Volume II (collection) (DMR Books, 2021)
- The Chronicles of Caylen-Tor, Volume III (collection) (DMR Books, 2024)

=== Captain Caleb Blackthorne series ===
- "Into the Dawn of Storms" (2015)
- "A Voyage on Benighted Seas" (2016)
- "The Scion at the Gate of Eternity" (2017)
- "The Voyages of Caleb Blackthorne" (compendium) (2019)

=== Other short stories ===
- "Darkfall: Return of the Vampyre Hunter" (2015)
- "Chronicles of the Obsidian Crown" (2015)
- "The Shrine of the Six-eyed Avatar" (2025)

=== Verse ===
- "When Dead Cthulhu Dreams" (2015)

=== Novels ===
- Karnov: Phantom-Clad Rider of the Cosmic Ice (with Howie K. Bentley and Matthew Knight) (DMR Books, 2019)

== Sources ==
- Hill, Gary. "The Strange Sound of Cthulhu", Lulu, 2006, pp. 54–57
- "The Cimmerian", vol. 4, number 3, 2007, p. 9
- "The Jack Kirby Collector", issue 50, TwoMorrows Publishing, 2008, p. 145
- Official Bal-Sagoth Website
- Official site for Byron Roberts
- MySpace page of Byron Roberts
- AllMusic Guide
- Byron Roberts Discography
- The Internet Speculative Fiction Database
