= The Barbarian Swordsmen =

Anthology of fantasy short stories edited by Peter Haining

- Cover of first edition
- Editor: Sean Richards
- Cover artist: Gino D'Achillle
- Language: English
- Genre: Fantasy
- Publisher: Star Books
- Publication date: 1981
- Publication place: United Kingdom
- Media type: Print (paperback)
- Pages: 172
- ISBN: 978-0-352-30831-3

The Barbarian Swordsmen is an anthology of sword and sorcery stories edited by Peter Haining under the pseudonym of Sean Richards, cover-billed as "the original sword and sorcery adventures." It was first published in paperback by Star Books in 1981.

The book collects eight novelettes and short stories by various early authors of sword and sorcery or pre-sword and sorcery, together with an introduction by the editor and a concluding letter from Robert E. Howard to H. P. Lovecraft of June 1934, recast as an essay.

== Contents ==
- "Introduction" (Sean Richards)
- "The War of Fire" (excerpt from The Quest for Fire, 1909) (J. H. Rosny)
- "The Sword of Welleran" • (from The Sword of Welleran and Other Stories, 1908) (Lord Dunsany)
- "The Tower of the Elephant" (Conan) (from Weird Tales, March 1933) (Robert E. Howard)
- "Brachan the Kelt" (first publication) (James Allison) (Robert E. Howard)
- "Jirel Meets Magic" (Jirel of Joiry) (from Weird Tales, July 1935) (C. L. Moore)
- "Spawn of Dagon" (Elak of Atlantis) (from Weird Tales, July 1938) (Henry Kuttner)
- "The Thief of Forthe" (Rald the Thief) (from Weird Tales, July 1937) (Clifford Ball)
- "The Two Best Thieves in Lankhmar" (Fafhrd and the Gray Mouser) (from Swords Against Wizardry, July 1968) (Fritz Leiber)
- "The Man Who Influenced Robert E. Howard" (Robert E. Howard; letter praising the poet Alfred Noyes)

== Reception ==
Morgan Holmes, reviewing the volume on castaliahouse.com, calls it "[a]n interesting anthology of sword and sorcery" and "a good little book as an introduction to foundational sword and sorcery fiction" for which "[t]he making of [the] Conan the Barbarian movie in the early 1980s appears to be the stimulus." He notes that "My main quibble ... is it could have been bigger. The addition of a Clark Ashton Smith and Nictzin Dyalhis story would have gotten it over the 200 page mark. There is even a Robert Bloch sword and sorcery story that keeps eluding anthologers that could have been used." In addition to comment on the individual stories, he observes that "Peter Haining’s nine page introduction is a good one with some discussion on what sword and sorcery is, and information on the stories and authors."
