= Marvel Flair Cards =

In 1994 and 1995 Marvel, in partnership with Fleer, released the "Marvel Annual Flair" sets of collectible trading cards. These consisted primarily of art taken from comics, re-colored with computer coloring techniques, and printed on thick, glossy, card stock.

== Flair 1994 ==
The base set consists of 149 cards and a checklist. There are 18 "PowerBlast" chase cards which have foil on one side and a larger portion of the same image, without foil, on the other side. An error occurs in the set wherein no #6 card exists, but two #8 cards: Iron Man (which is listed on the checklist as #6) and the real card #8 Vulture. The "PowerBlast" set is made of #1 Cable, #2 Cyclops, #3 Iron Man, #4 Magneto, #5 Phoenix, #6 Storm, #7 Venom, #8 Wolverine, #9 Ghost Rider, #10 Punisher, #11 Captain America, #12 Gambit, #13 Thor, #14 Silver Surfer, #15 Spider-Man, #16 Deadpool, #17 Invisible Woman and #18 Doctor Doom.

== Flair 1995 ==
The base set consists of 149 cards and a checklist. For chase cards, there are 24 PowerBlast chase cards of the same style as the 1994 ones. This set also included three "DuoBlast" cards which have a different character on each side (i.e. Iron Man and War Machine). Another first for a Marvel set are the "HoloBlasts" which show two characters fighting, but one character is printed normally, and the other is a hologram. There are also 12 chromium cards. An official binder was also produced for the set.
