= Viking Adventures =

2021 book edited by D. M. Ritzlin

- Cover of first edition
- Editor: D. M. Ritzlin
- Cover artist: Ash Stewart Art
- Language: English
- Genre: Historical fiction
- Publisher: DMR Books
- Publication date: 2021
- Publication place: United States
- Media type: print (paperback), ebook
- Pages: 206
- ISBN: 978-1-956173-00-0
- Preceded by: Prehistoric Adventures
- Followed by: Celtic Adventures

Viking Adventures is an anthology of historical fiction short stories and poetry edited by D. M. Ritzlin. It was first published in trade paperback and ebook by DMR Books in August 2021.

== Summary ==
The book collects six short works and two poems by various authors set in the times of the Vikings.

== Contents ==
- "The Teuton's Battle-song" (poem) (from The United Amateur, Feb. 1916) (H. P. Lovecraft)
- "The Trader and the Vikings" (from Jack London's Adventure Magazine, Oct. 1958) (Poul Anderson)
- "The Regent of the North" (from The Theosophical Path, Aug. 1915) (Kenneth Morris)
- "The Valkyries" (from The Valkyries: A Romance Founded on Wagner's Opera, 1903) (E. F. Benson)
- "The Passing of Sweyn" (from Short Stories, Jul. 1908) (Ray Wynn)
- "Seanachas" (from The Washer of the Ford and Other Legendary Moralites, 1896) (Fiona Macleod)
- "Vengeance" (from Adventure, Jun. 30, 1925) (Arthur Gilchrist Brodeur)
- "Ragnarok" (poem) (from Weird Tales, Jun. 1937) (Henry Kuttner)
