= Swordsmen from the Stars =

2020 collection of short stories by Poul Anderson

- Cover of first edition
- Author: Poul Anderson
- Cover artist: Allen Anderson
- Language: English
- Genre: Science fantasy
- Publisher: DMR Books
- Publication date: 2020
- Publication place: United States
- Media type: print (paperback), ebook
- Pages: 174
- ISBN: 978-1-73340-865-3

Swordsmen from the Stars is a collection of sword and planet science fantasy short stories by American author Poul Anderson. It was first published in trade paperback and ebook by DMR Books in April 2020.

== Summary ==
The book collects three short works of fiction by the author featuring adventure on alien worlds (and in one instance, Earth) of the far future that have reverted to barbarism.

== Contents ==
- "Witch of the Demon Seas" (from Planet Stories, Jan. 1951).
- "The Virgin of Valkarion" (from Planet Stories, Jul. 1951).
- "Swordsman of Lost Terra" (from Planet Stories, Nov. 1951).
