= Savage Heroes =

Anthology of fantasy short stories edited by Michel Parry

- Cover of first edition
- Editor: Eric Pendragon
- Cover artist: Les Edwards
- Language: English
- Genre: Fantasy
- Publisher: Star Books
- Publication date: 1977
- Publication place: United Kingdom
- Media type: Print (paperback)
- Pages: 190
- ISBN: 978-0-352-39672-3

Savage Heroes is an anthology of sword and sorcery stories edited by Michel Parry under the pseudonym of Eric Pendragon. It was first published in paperback by Star Books in February 1977. The first U.S. edition was issued in hardcover and trade paperback by Taplinger in March 1980. The editor's pseudonym was dropped for the Taplinger edition.

== Summary ==
The book collects nine novelettes and short stories by various early authors of sword and sorcery, together with an introduction by the editor.

== Contents ==
- "Introduction" (Eric Pendragon)
- "Jirel Meets Magic" (Jirel of Joiry) (from Weird Tales, July 1935) (C. L. Moore)
- "The Spawn of Dagon" (Elak of Atlantis) (from Weird Tales, July 1938) (Henry Kuttner)
- "Necromancy in Naat" (Zothique) (from Weird Tales, July 1936) (Clark Ashton Smith)
- "The Thief of Forthe" (Rald the Thief) (from Weird Tales, July 1937) (Clifford Ball)
- "The Song at the Hub of the Garden" (Ryre) (first publication) (Ramsey Campbell)
- "Alma Mater" (first publication) (Daphne Castell)
- "In the Lair of Yslsl" (Kane) (from Midnight Sun, 1974) (Karl Edward Wagner)
- "The Barrow Troll" (from Whispers no. 8, December 1975) (David Drake)
- "The Temple of Abomination" (Cormac Mac Art) (from Tigers of the Sea, 1974) (Robert E. Howard and Richard Tierney)

== Reception ==
The anthology was reviewed by Philip Stephensen-Payne in Paperback Parlour v. 1, no. 3, June 1977, W. Paul Ganley in Eerie Country no. 3, 1980, and Theodore Sturgeon in Rod Serling's The Twilight Zone Magazine v.1, no. 1, April 1981 .
