= Prehistoric Adventures =

2021 book edited by D. M. Ritzlin

- Cover of first edition
- Editor: D. M. Ritzlin
- Cover artist: J. Allen St. John
- Language: English
- Genre: Prehistoric fiction
- Publisher: DMR Books
- Publication date: 2021
- Publication place: United States
- Media type: print (paperback), ebook
- Pages: 206
- ISBN: 978-1-735-89829-2
- Preceded by: Planetary Adventures
- Followed by: Viking Adventures

Prehistoric Adventures is an anthology of prehistoric fiction short stories edited by D. M. Ritzlin. It was first published in trade paperback and ebook by DMR Books in June 2021.

== Summary ==
The book collects five short works by various authors set in prehistoric times.

It includes three stories taken from Weird Tales including Robert E Howard's first professional publication.

== Contents ==
- "Dinosaur Destroyer: The Story of Daarmajd, the Strong" (from Amazing Stories, Jan. 1949) (Arthur Petticolas). Lewis Varjeon, overtaken by a sudden racial memory of a previous life, recounts his former existence as Daarmajd the Strong and his career of primitive warfare and conquest back in prehistoric times.
- "Spear and Fang" (from Weird Tales, Jul. 1925) (Robert E. Howard). A-aea, a Cro-Magnon girl, is abducted by the lustful Ka-nanu, a member of her tribe, who is in turn killed by one of the enemy gur-na (Neanderthals), also with impure purpose. She is saved by her preferred lover Ga-nor, tracks the abductors and for her sake fights the gur-na to the death.
- "With Weapons of Stone" (from Weird Tales, Dec. 1924) (C. M. Eddy Jr.). The cave people of the Great Cliffs are called together by chief Gra to witness the affiancing of his son (also Gra) to the beautiful Zo-na. Ra-nor, who also hankers after Zo-na, objects. She, though preferring Ra-nor, diplomatically pledges to wed whichever lays brings her the head of a saber-tooth tiger. Ra-nor hunts the tiger while his rival hunts him, planning to let Ra-nor do the work and then kill him for the trophy. Zo-na, driven by a premonition, follows both, arriving in time to see Ra-nor kill the tiger and Gra poised to murder him. From hiding, she throws her stone dagger, killing Gra, then flees home to await her lover.
- "Arhl-a of the Caves" (from Weird Tales, Jan. 1925) (C. M. Eddy Jr.). Cave woman Arhl-a is captive to hulking brute Zurg. She counts on her lover Wagh the Mighty to save her, but since he's taking too long struggles free and knifes Zurg herself. Wagh, having tracked them, arrives to find his work done and Arhl-a missing. Lost and attacked by an ape, she lets out a scream he is conveniently close enough to hear, allowing him to pop in and kill it. All's well again.
- "Stories of the Stone Age" (from The Idler, May-Aug. 1897) (H. G. Wells). An account of a primitive couple's dawning curiosity in regard to the world they live in. Some scenes are told from the point of view of the animals they encounter.
