= Arthur D. Howden Smith =

American novelist

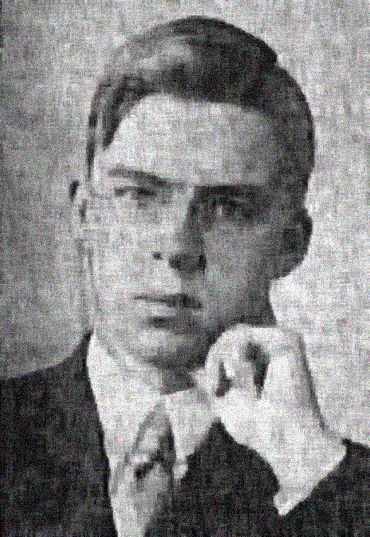
Portrait from a 1908 newspaper

Arthur Douglas Howden Smith (1887–1945) was an American historian and novelist.

== Life ==
Smith was born in New York. In 1907, at the suggestion of writer Albert Sonnichsen, he got in touch with the Internal Macedonian Revolutionary Organization (VMRO), traveled to the Balkans, and spent two months illegally in the region of Nevrokop, eastern Macedonia, with an armed band of the Organization. His experiences he recounted in 1908 in the book Fighting the Turk in the Balkans, describing the revolutionary struggle in Macedonia. On returning to the United States, Smith became a reporter for the newspaper the New York Evening Post.

== Work ==
Smith began writing by contributing fiction to pulp magazines; his main market was Adventure. Smith also wrote fiction for Blue Book.

For Adventure, Smith wrote sea stories about the adventures of Captain McConaughy. There were also historical swashbucklers about a Viking, Swain, living in Medieval Orkney and engaged in a terrible feud with the witch Frakork and her blood-thirsty grandson Olvir Rosta – which Smith based on historical information provided by the Orkneyinga saga. The Swain saga has since been reprinted in four volumes by DMR Books.

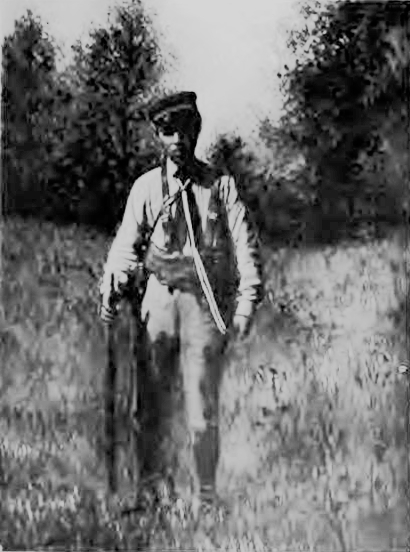
Smith in Macedonian rebel (VMRO) uniform, 1907

Smith's most famous series were the "Grey Maiden" stories. This revolved around a cursed sword created during the reign of Pharaoh Thutmose III and its subsequent appearances through world history. This has since been reprinted by Steeger Books.

Smith also wrote The Doom Trail (1921) and its sequel Beyond the Sunset, the adventures of Harry Ormerod, an 18th-century English exile, in the frontier of Colonial North America at the Iroqois country where a fierce struggle is waged with French agents out of Canada for control of the fur trade. They were published in book form after running in Adventure.

Smith was a great admirer of Robert Louis Stevenson. In Porto Bello Gold (1924), a prequel to Treasure Island – written with the permission of Robert Louis Stevenson's executor, Lloyd Osbourne – Harry Ormerod's son Robert goes to sea in the company of such famous pirates as Captain Flint, Long John Silver and Billy Bones and takes part in capturing the treasure which would be recovered in Stevenson's book. Smith also wrote a sequel to Stevenson's Kidnapped, Alan Breck Again.

The Ormerod Family saga was continued further in The Manifest Destiny where Robert Ormerod's great-grandson takes part in the expeditions of the 19th century adventurer William Walker.

Smith wrote several books on American history, including a biography of Cornelius Vanderbilt, Commodore Vanderbilt: An Epic of American Achievement (1927).

== Influence ==
Fantasy historian Morgan Holmes has argued that Smith's "Swain" stories were an influence on the work of Robert E. Howard. Holmes has written "there is a clue that Robert E. Howard read the "Swain" stories in Adventure. Swain carries a sword called Hausakliufr - Skullsplitter. Robert E. Howard wrote a few stories in the 1930s about Cormac MacArt and his Danish partner, Wulfhere the Skullsplitter, also called Hausakliufr."
