= Worlds Beyond Worlds =

2021 book by John R. Fultz

- Cover of first edition
- Author: John R. Fultz
- Cover artist: Brian LeBlanc
- Language: English
- Genre: Fantasy
- Publisher: DMR Books
- Publication date: 2021
- Publication place: United States
- Media type: print (paperback), ebook
- Pages: 180
- ISBN: 978-1-73589-826-1

Worlds Beyond Worlds: The Short Fiction of John R. Fultz is a collection of fantasy short stories by American author John R. Fultz. It was first published in trade paperback and ebook by DMR Books in April 2021.

== Summary ==
The book collects eleven short works by the author.

== Contents ==
- "Chivaine" (from Weirdbook 31, Sep. 18, 2015)
- "Yael of the Strings" (from Shattered Shields, Nov. 2014)
- "Ten Thousand Drops of Holy Blood" (from Skelos no. 3, Fall 2017)
- Strange Days in Old Yandrissa (Mar. 2012)
- "The Gnomes of Carrick County" (from Space & Time no. 116, Spring 2012)
- "The Thirteen Texts of Arthyria" (from Way of the Wizard, Nov. 2010)
- "Daughter of the Elk Goddess" (from Deepest, Darkest Eden, Aug. 2013)
- "The Penitence of the Blade" (from The Audient Void no. 2, Oct. 2016)
- "Where the White Lotus Grows" (from Monk Punk, 2011)
- "Oorg" (from The Audient Void no. 5, Apr. 2018)
- "Tears of the Elohim" (from Forbidden Futures no. 3, Winter 2018)

== Reception ==
The collection was reviewed by Graham Thomas Wilcox in Old Moon Quarterly, Autumn 2022.
