= A Black Moon Broods Over Lemuria =

Studio album by Bal-Sagoth
- Released: May 14, 1995
- Recorded: June 1994 at Academy Studio
- Genres: Blackened death metal, symphonic black metal
- Length: 54:27
- Label: Cacophonous
- Producer: Mags

Bal-Sagoth chronology
1993 Demo (1993)	A Black Moon Broods Over Lemuria (1995)	Starfire Burning Upon the Ice-Veiled Throne of Ultima Thule (1996)

A Black Moon Broods Over Lemuria is Bal-Sagoth's 1995 debut album after their 1993 demo. It was recorded in a two-week period in June 1994, but due to label problems the album was released almost a year later. The name Lemuria comes from a hypothetical land mass in the Indian Ocean. The keyboard intro on this album was written and performed by Keith Appleton, the proprietor of Academy Music Studio, the studio where the album was recorded.

On 13 May 2016 the album was re-released by Cacophonous Records as a special edition CD featuring remastered audio, expanded lyric booklet, new sleeve notes and exclusive new artwork.

Until September 2026, 'A Black Moon Broods Over Lemuria' remained the only one of the band's Cacophonous era albums to have been given a vinyl release, first in 1995 as a single disc LP, and then as a double vinyl gatefold edition in 2016. Ultimately, the German label Darkness Shall Rise Productions would reissue the band's first three albums on vinyl on 15 September 2026.

In January 2018 the album was issued as a limited edition cassette version by the Malaysian label Diabolicurst Productions under license from Cacophonous Records. The edition was limited to just 100 copies.

On 15 September 2026, the album was reissued on CD, cassette and double LP by the German label Darkness Shall Rise Productions under license from Cacophonous Records. The reissue featured remastered audio and an expanded lyric booklet.

== Track listing ==
All tracks are written by Byron Roberts Jonny and Chris Maudling, except as noted.

No.	Title	Music	Length
1.	"Hatheg Kla"	Keith Appleton	1:59
2.	"Dreaming of Atlantean Spires"		6:15
3.	"Spellcraft & Moonfire (Beyond the Citadel of Frosts)"		7:10
4.	"A Black Moon Broods Over Lemuria"		9:53
5.	"Enthroned in the Temple of the Serpent Kings"		5:09
6.	"Shadows 'Neath the Black Pyramid"		6:30
7.	"Witch-Storm"		5:07
8.	"The Ravening"		2:23
9.	"Into the Silent Chambers of the Sapphirean Throne (Sagas from the Antediluvian Scrolls)"		8:27
10.	"Valley of Silent Paths"		1:34
Total length:			54:57

== Personnel ==
=== Bal-Sagoth ===
- Byron Roberts – vocals
- Chris Maudling – guitar
- Jonny Maudling – drums, keyboards

=== Additional ===
- Gian Pyres (as John Piras) – guitar solo on "The Ravening"
- Jason Porter – bass
- Vincent Crabtree – keyboards on “Atlantean Spires”
- Mags – engineering, producer
