= Bal-Sagoth =

British symphonic black metal band

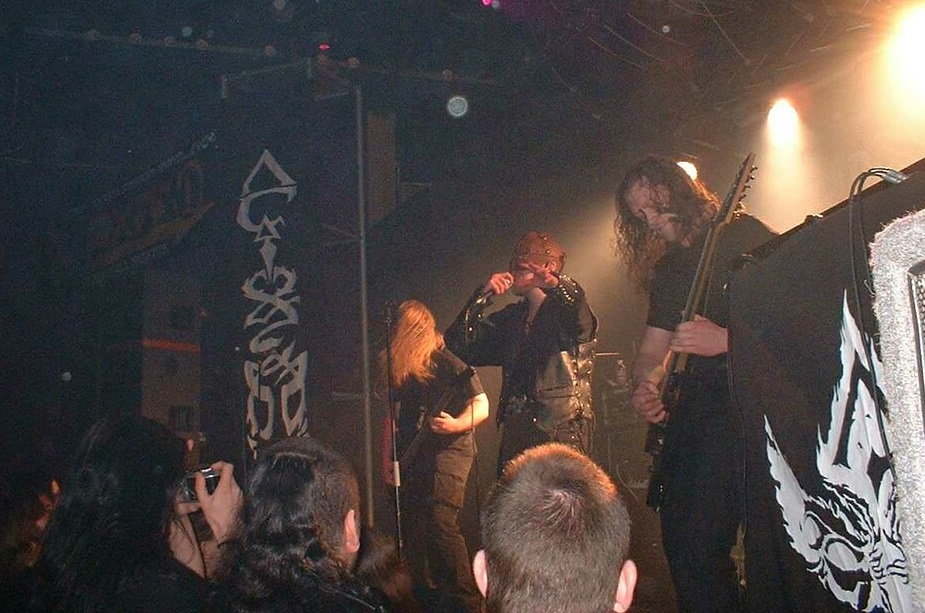
- Bal-Sagoth performing in 2002

Background information
- Origin: Sheffield, South Yorkshire, England
- Genre: Symphonic black metal
- Years active: 1993–2013
- Labels: Cacophonous, Nuclear Blast
- Members: Byron Roberts; Jonny Maudling; Chris Maudling; Paul Jackson; Alistair MacLatchy
- Past members: Jason Porter; Vincent Crabtree; Leon Forrest; Dave Mackintosh; Dan Mullins; Mark Greenwell
- Website: bal-sagoth.net

Bal-Sagoth (/baʊl ˈsæɡɒθ/) are an English symphonic black metal band from Sheffield, formed in 1993. The group formed as an epic symphonic black metal band with death metal elements. Vocalist/lyricist Byron Roberts took the name Bal-Sagoth from the Robert E. Howard short story "The Gods of Bal-Sagoth". The band's first demo was recorded in 1993, and Bal-Sagoth have since released three albums on Cacophonous Records and three with Nuclear Blast.

== History ==
=== Early days (1989–1993) ===
Bal-Sagoth was conceived in 1989 by Byron Roberts as "a sublimely symphonic black/death metal band swathed in a concept of dark fantasy and science fiction, inspired by the celebrated style of the grand pulp horror and fantasy literature of the 1930s". Inspired by Robert E. Howard, H. P. Lovecraft, Clark Ashton Smith, Edgar Rice Burroughs, J.R.R Tolkien and Jack Kirby, Roberts set out to create a dark fantasy universe through epic lyrics and music. After several false starts, Roberts met brothers Chris and Jonny Maudling in 1993, who were looking to form a band. They became the writing core of the outfit. After months of rehearsing and the departure of lead guitarist Alistair MacLatchy, the band recorded their first demo in late 1993. The lineup at this point consisted of Roberts on vocals, Chris Maudling on guitar, drummer Jonny Maudling, bassist Jason Porter, and Vincent Crabtree on keyboards. Cacophonous Records signed the band to a three-album deal.

=== First trilogy (1994–1999) ===
The band entered Academy Music Studio in June 1994 and recorded their debut album, A Black Moon Broods Over Lemuria, in two weeks. Due to label problems, the album was shelved for nearly a year. It was released in 1995. The album featured black metal/death metal as opposed to sprawling arrangements the group would use later. Roberts's vocals differed from later efforts, using death metal and black metal grunts, as well as spoken narrative passages that would become prevalent on subsequent albums.

In 1996, Bal-Sagoth released Starfire Burning Upon the Ice-Veiled Throne of Ultima Thule, recorded at Academy Music Studio in England. The album focused on the compositions and arrangements of drummer and studio keyboard player Jonny Maudling, as well as the "storytelling" of Roberts's spoken-word vocals. Through keyboards, the band incorporated a virtual symphony orchestra along with guitar, bass, drums and vocals. They would expand this sound on all four of the band's later efforts.

Joined by touring keyboardist Leon Forrest and bassist Alistair MacLatchy, who had been an original member of the band, Bal-Sagoth toured with Dark Funeral and Ancient in March 1997 in the "Starfire Engulfs Europe Tour" (AKA the "Satanic War Tour II"), a 23-date trek through Europe, followed by the second leg in October 1997 with black metal band Emperor and thrash metal outfit Nocturnal Breed.

Bal-Sagoth spent much of 1997 writing and recording the album Battle Magic. Recorded at Academy Music Studio in England, the band were afforded nearly a full month to record the album. Released in March 1998, Battle Magic caught the attention of Nuclear Blast, who signed Bal-Sagoth to a three-album deal with worldwide distribution.

Rather than tour in support of Battle Magic, the band focused on writing and recording their Nuclear Blast debut. Frustrated with fill-in tour keyboard players, Maudling focused full-time on composition and live keyboards in 1999, handing drums over to Dave Mackintosh, later of DragonForce.

=== Second trilogy (1999–2006) ===
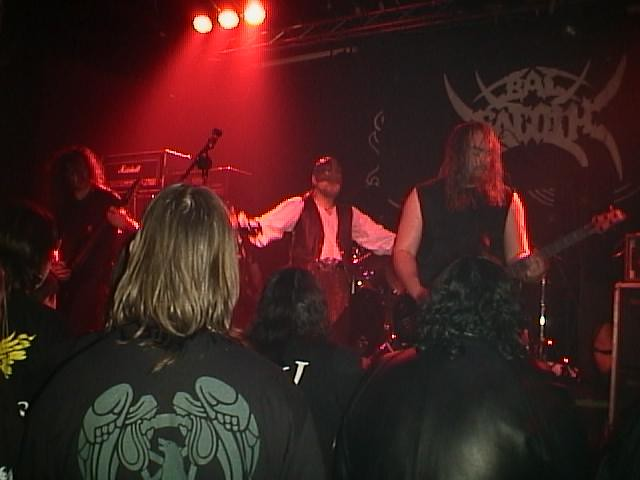
Bal-Sagoth live in Bradford, UK, 2001

In 1999, Bal-Sagoth released their first album with Nuclear Blast, The Power Cosmic. Focusing on an intergalactic tale of war, empires, and gods, the album pushed the band artistically. After the release of The Power Cosmic, the band did not play any shows until the release of 2001's Atlantis Ascendant.

The band resurfaced as a live act in 2001, embarking on "The Fifth Cataclysm Devours Europe: Phase 1" tour (AKA: No Mercy festival tour) with Mortician, Sinister, Vader, Amon Amarth, Marduk, God Dethroned, ...and Oceans, and Mystic Circle. Shortly after this, they toured Europe with Marduk. Later in 2002, the band played the Bloodstock Open Air indoor festival, followed by a short tour with Return to the Sabbat in the United Kingdom. In 2004, Dave Mackintosh left the band and joined DragonForce. He was replaced with Dan Mullins, who left the band in 2006 and became drummer of My Dying Bride. Mullins debuted with Bal-Sagoth at Wacken Open Air 2004.

In March 2006, Bal-Sagoth released their sixth album, The Chthonic Chronicles, on Nuclear Blast. The music was recorded at Jonny Maudling's Waylands Forge Studio, while the vocals were recorded at Academy Music Studio. Shortly after its release, the band recruited drummer Paul Jackson. The album was the band's first in five years, and was rumoured to be their last, although the band stated that they had no intentions of recording another album or splitting up, and that various members of the band might announce side projects.

=== Recent activity (2006–present) ===
In the summer of 2006, Bal-Sagoth played at the Bloodstock Open Air festival, and in January 2007, they headlined the "Heathen Crusade II" festival in St. Paul, Minnesota. In January 2008, they headlined shows in Helsinki and Turku, supported by Finnish band Battlelore, and in November 2008, they played the Screamfest festival in Oslo, Norway. In May 2009, the band played two shows in Lisbon and Porto, Portugal. In January 2010, Mark Greenwell left the band to be replaced with previous bassist Alistair MacLatchy, and in March 2010, Bal-Sagoth returned to Finland to play a show in Helsinki with Skyclad. On 14 August 2010, Bal-Sagoth performed at the Brutal Assault festival in the Czech Republic. On 5 March 2011, the band headlined a show in Bern, Switzerland.

In November 2011, three of the band's albums (The Power Cosmic, Atlantis Ascendant and The Chthonic Chronicles) were reissued as limited edition digipaks by Nuclear Blast's affiliate label Metal Mind Productions. The reissues featured expanded lyric booklets, additional artwork and remastered audio. The band announced that they were planning a limited edition re-release of their demo, previously only available in limited numbers via cassette tape. In March 2013, it was announced that the 1993 demo release would be titled "Apocryphal Tales" and would be available as a "20th anniversary" limited edition 12-inch vinyl LP, issued through Sacrilege Records. In September, 2013 Bal-Sagoth announced that the release was changed to limited edition 10" vinyl and CD, issued by Godreah Records and Exhumation Records.

In February 2013, it was announced that Bal-Sagoth guitarist Chris Maudling and keyboardist Jonny Maudling had formed a band called Kull, consisting of various members of Bal-Sagoth and unsigned death metal band Dyscaphia.

On 21 February 2015, the anthology paperback "Swords of Steel" was published by DMR Books. The publication contains a short story by Roberts titled "Into the Dawn of Storms", featuring characters from Bal-Sagoth's songs.

On 30 July 2015, the anthology "Barbarian Crowns" was published by Horrified Press/Barbwire Butterfly Books. This publication contains a short story by Roberts titled "Chronicles of the Obsidian Crown," featuring characters and events from Bal-Sagoth's songs. On the same day, the anthology "Devil's Armory" was also published by Horrified Press. This publication contains a short story by Roberts titled "Darkfall: Return of the Vampyre Hunter," which features characters from Bal-Sagoth lyrics. The publication of "Barbarian Crowns" was accompanied by the release of the compilation CD Bloodmist at Dawn, issued through Majestic Metal Records and featuring two Bal-Sagoth tracks.

On 27 February 2016, the anthology paperback "Swords of Steel II" was published by DMR Books. This publication contains a short story by Roberts titled "A Voyage on Benighted Seas", the second instalment of a trilogy that began in the first volume of "Swords of Steel".

On 13 May 2016, the band's first two albums, A Black Moon Broods Over Lemuria and Starfire Burning Upon the Ice-Veiled Throne of Ultima Thule, were re-released by Cacophonous Records as special edition CDs. The re-issues feature remastered audio, expanded lyric booklets, new sleeve notes and exclusive new artwork. On 16 September 2016, the third Bal-Sagoth album, Battle Magic, was reissued by Cacophonous Records on CD featuring remastered audio, expanded lyric booklet and new cover artwork.

On 19 May 2017, the anthology paperback "Swords of Steel III" was published by DMR Books. This publication contains a short story by Roberts titled "The Scion at the Gate of Eternity", the third instalment of a trilogy featuring characters from Bal-Sagoth songs.

On 18 March 2018, the sword and sorcery anthology "Dreams of Fire and Steel" was published by Nocturnicorn Books. The book includes a short story by Roberts titled "Caylen-Tor", featuring a character that appeared in the Bal-Sagoth album Starfire Burning Upon the Ice-Veiled Throne of Ultima Thule in 1996.

On 14 May 2019, the novel "The Chronicles of Caylen-Tor" was published by DMR Books. The book consists of three novellas by Roberts featuring a character that appeared in Starfire Burning Upon the Ice-Veiled Throne of Ultima Thule in 1996.

On 24 May 2019, the debut album of Jonny and Chris Maudling's project Kull was released by Black Lion Records.

On 16 October 2020, The Power Cosmic, Atlantis Ascendant and The Chthonic Chronicles were reissued as digipak CD editions via Dissonance Productions.

On 13 May 2021, the novel "The Chronicles of Caylen-Tor Volume II" was published by DMR Books. The book consists of four stories by Roberts featuring the same character from Starfire Burning Upon the Ice-Veiled Throne of Ultima Thule, and is a sequel to "The Chronicles of Caylen-Tor".

In October 2020, February 2021 and July 2021, limited vinyl editions of the fourth, fifth and sixth Bal-Sagoth albums were released by Night of the Vinyl Dead. The releases featured coloured vinyl and special packaging, with "The Power Cosmic" including a movable die-cut tab, "Atlantis Ascendant" sporting a lenticular 3D cover, and "The Chthonic Chronicles" featuring a gatefold sleeve secured by a die-cut magnetic clasp.

In 2022, "The Power Cosmic", "Atlantis Ascendant" and "The Chthonic Chronicles" were reissued as gatefold "splatter vinyl" LPs by specialist vinyl label Back On Black.

In February 2024, the trade paperback The Chronicles of Caylen-Tor Volume III was published by DMR Books. The third volume in the series by Roberts consists of three novellas featuring the aforementioned character.

On 7 April 2025, the anthology paperback "Swords of Steel IV" was published by DMR Books. This publication contains a short story by Roberts titled "The Shrine of the Six-eyed Avatar", featuring Bal-Sagoth characters and concepts.

On 15 September 2026, the band's first three albums, A Black Moon Broods Over Lemuria, Starfire Burning Upon the Ice-Veiled Throne of Ultima Thule and Battle Magic were reissued on CD, vinyl and cassette. These reissues featured remastered audio and were released by the German label Darkness Shall Rise Productions under license from Cacophonous Records.

== Current members ==
=== Final line-up ===
- Byron Roberts – vocals (1993–2013)
- Chris Maudling – guitar (1993–2013)
- Jonny Maudling – drums (1993–1998), keyboards (1998–2013)
- Alistair MacLatchy – bass (1996–1998, 2010–2013)
- Paul Jackson – drums (2007–2013)

=== Former members ===
- Jason Porter – bass (1993–1996)
- Vincent Crabtree – keyboards (1993–1995)
- Leon Forrest – keyboards (1995–1998)
- Dave Mackintosh – drums (1998–2004)
- Dan Mullins − drums (2004–2007)
- Mark Greenwell – bass (1998–2010)

== Discography ==
Year	Title	Label
1995	A Black Moon Broods Over Lemuria	Cacophonous
1996	Starfire Burning Upon the Ice-Veiled Throne of Ultima Thule	Cacophonous
1998	Battle Magic	Cacophonous
1999	The Power Cosmic	Nuclear Blast
2001	Atlantis Ascendant	Nuclear Blast
2006	The Chthonic Chronicles	Nuclear Blast
2013	Apocryphal Tales (Demo 1993)	Godreah Records
