= Planetary Adventures =

2021 book edited by D. M. Ritzlin

- Cover of first edition
- Editor: D. M. Ditzlin
- Cover artist: George Rozen
- Language: English
- Genre: Fantasy
- Publisher: DMR Books
- Publication date: 2021
- Publication place: United States
- Media type: print (paperback), ebook
- Pages: 226
- ISBN: 978-1735898285
- Followed by: Prehistoric Adventures

Planetary Adventures is an anthology of Sword and Planet short stories edited by D. M. Ritzlin, the first in a trio of adventure anthologies, each focusing on a different genre. It was first published in trade paperback and ebook by DMR Books in June 2021.

== Summary ==
The book collects five short works by various authors in the Sword and Planet subgenre.

== Contents ==
- "The Temple of Earth" (from Rocket Stories, Jul. 1953) (Poul Anderson). Rikard and his outlaws battle to liberate the subjugated slaves of an underground world beneath the surface of the Moon.
- "World of the Dark Dwellers" (from Weird Tales, Aug. 1937) (Edmond Hamilton). Eric North, bequeathed the key to finding the crimson world of Krann, joins forces with the Brotherhood of Redeemers to save it from the Dwellers in Darkness.
- "The Eyes of Thar" (from Planet Stories, Fall 1944) (Henry Kuttner). Earthman Samuel Dantan, hounded by the Redhelms of Mars to a desert laboratory, is forced into an interdimensional battle to protect a mystery women.
- "The Empress of Mars" (from Fantastic Adventures, May 1939) (Ross Rocklynne). Darek of Werg seeks to save his princess from the warriors of the Empress of Mars.
- "Man of Two Worlds" (from Space Stories, Oct. 1952) (Bryce Walton). The corrupt colonial government of Mars hounds outcasts Lee Thorsten and Lora Saunlon to a mysterious black pyramid that may hide a dimensional gateway to other worlds and times.

== Reception ==
Henry Moulder, characterizing the stories in the anthology as "fantastic gems from the golden age of science fiction and fantasy" and "in the ... vein of the legendary John Carter of Mars and Captain Future," writes "there is plenty here that makes this collection of rare and lesser-known tales from some of the greatest fiction writers of the early 20th century a worthy addition to your library."
