= DMR Books =

- Founded: 2015; 11 years ago
- Founder: D. M. Ritzlin
- Country of origin: United States
- Headquarters location: Chicago, Illinois
- Official website: dmrbooks.com

DMR Books is a Chicago-based small publisher active since 2015. The press was founded by D. M. Ritzlin. It is primarily a paperback and ebook publisher specializing in "fantasy, horror, and adventure fiction in the traditions of Robert E. Howard, H.P. Lovecraft, and other classic writers of the pulp era."

Authors whose works were returned to print by DMR Books include Poul Anderson, Clifford Ball, Nictzin Dyalhis, Edmond Hamilton, A. B. Higginson, Thomas P. Kelley, Henry Kuttner, Tanith Lee, A. Merritt, Glenn Rahman, Arthur D. Howden Smith, and Manly Wade Wellman. Contemporary authors published by DMR include Howie K. Bentley, Ramsey Campbell, Adrian Cole, Gael DeRoane, John R. Fultz, Schuyler Hernstrom, Matthew Knight, Harry Piper, D. M. Ritzlin, Byron A. Roberts, and J. Christopher Tarpey.

DMR's books have featured cover art by Allen Anderson, Hannes Bok, Louis Braquet, Margaret Brundage, Bebeto Daroz, Virgil Finlay, Lauren Gornick, Martin Hanford, Robert Gibson Jones, and Brian LeBlanc.

== Books published ==
- Swords of Steel, anthology edited by D. M. Ritzlin, 2015.
- Swords of Steel II, anthology edited by D. M. Ritzlin, 2016.
- Swords of Steel III, anthology edited by D. M. Ritzlin, May 2017.
- Lands of the Earthquake / Under a Dim Blue Sun, double novel by Henry Kuttner and Howie K. Bentley, June 2017.
- The Sapphire Goddess: The Fantasies of Nictzin Dyalhis, collection by Nictzin Dyalhis, March 2018.
- The Thief of Forthe and Other Stories, collection by Clifford Ball, March 2018.
- The Chronicles of Caylen-Tor, collection by Byron A. Roberts, May 2019.
- The Road to Infinity, novel by Gael DeRoane, June 2019.
- The Infernal Bargain and Other Stories, anthology edited by D. M. Ritzlin, 2019.
- Death Dealers & Diabolists, anthology edited by D. M. Ritzlin, July 2019.
- Warlords, Warlocks & Witches, anthology edited by D. M. Ritzlin, August 2019.
- Heroes of Atlantis and Lemuria, anthology edited by D. M. Ritzlin, September 2019.
- Swords of Steel Omnibus, anthology edited by D. M. Ritzlin, October 2019.
- Wulfhere, novel by A. B. Higginson, November 2019.
- Karnov: Phantom-Clad Rider of the Cosmic Ice, novel by Howie K. Bentley, Matthew Knight, and Byron A. Roberts, December 2019.
- Renegade Swords, anthology edited by D. M. Ritzlin, March 2020.
- Swordsmen from the Stars, collection by Poul Anderson, April 2020.
- The Eye of Sounnu, collection by Schuyler Hernstrom, May 2020.
- A Million Years in the Future, novel by Thomas P. Kelley, June 2020.
- The Great Die Slow and Other Tales of Dark Adventure, collection by Harry Piper, August 2020.
- Necromancy in Nilztiria, collection by D. M. Ritzlin, September 2020.
- The Godblade, novel by J. Christopher Tarpey, October 2020.
- Cahena: A Dream of the Past, novel by Manly Wade Wellman, November 2020.
- Twilight of the Gods, collection by Edmond Hamilton, December 2020.
- The Avenger from Atlantis, collection by Edmond Hamilton, January 2021.
- The Empress of Dreams, collection by Tanith Lee, February 2021.
- Renegade Swords II, anthology edited by D. M. Ritzlin, February 2021.
- Worlds Beyond Worlds, collection by John R. Fultz, April 2021.
- The Chronicles of Caylen-Tor, Volume II, collection by Byron A. Roberts, May 2021.
- Planetary Adventures, anthology edited by D. M. Ritzlin, June 2021.
- Prehistoric Adventures, anthology edited by D. M. Ritzlin, July 2021.
- Viking Adventures, anthology edited by D. M. Ritzlin, August 2021.
- Far Away & Never, collection by Ramsey Campbell, October 2021.
- Renegade Swords III, anthology edited by D. M. Ritzlin, March 2022.
- Terra Incognito: Lost Worlds of Fantasy and Adventure, anthology edited by Doug Draa, May 2022.
- Arminius, Bane of Eagles (War on Rome, v. 1), novel by Adrian Cole, September 2022.
- Samhain Sorceries, anthology edited by D. M. Ritzlin, September 2022.
- The Saga of Swain the Viking. Volume I: Swain's Vengeance, collection by Arthur D. Howden Smith, December 2022.
- The Saga of Swain the Viking. Volume II: Swain's Chase, collection by Arthur D. Howden Smith, January 2023.
- A Feast of Ambrosia: The Adventures of Bingor and Donalbain, collection by Glenn Rahman, February 2023.
- The Earth is Flat: Tales from the Flat Earth and Elsewhere, collection by Tanith Lee, March 2023.
- The Saga of Swain the Viking. Volume III: Swain Kingsbane, collection by Arthur D. Howden Smith, April 2023.
- Die by the Sword (Volume I), anthology edited by D. M. Ritzlin, May 2023.
- The Saga of Swain the Viking. Volume IV: Swain's Justice, collection by Arthur D. Howden Smith, July 2023.
- Germanicus, Lord of Eagles (War on Rome, v. 2), novel by Adrian Cole, September 2023
- Vran the Chaos-Warped, novel by D. M. Ritzlin, October 2023.
- The Chronicles of Caylen-Tor, Volume III, collection by Byron A. Roberts, February 2024.
- Die by the Sword Volume II, anthology edited by D. M. Ritzlin, March 2024.
- Dark Dreams of Nilztiria, collection by D. M. Ritzlin, April 2024.
- The Ship of Ishtar, novel by A. Merritt, November 2024.
- Swords of Steel IV, anthology edited by D. M. Ritzlin, April 2025.
- Celtic Adventures, anthology edited by D. M. Ritzlin, July 2025.
- Dwellers in the Mirage, novel by A. Merritt, Nov. 9, 2025.
- Against the Demon World, novel by D. M. Ritzlin, Feb. 2, 2026.
- Walpurgis Witcheries, anthology edited by D. M. Rizlin, Apr. 30, 2026.
- Two Tales of Witchery, anthology edited by D. M. Ritzlin, Apr. 30, 2026.
- Kingdoms Trembling, collection by M. Stern, Jun. 8, 2026.
- Renegade Swords IV, anthology edited by D. M. Ritzlin, Sep. 6, 2022.
