= Martin Hanford =

British fantasy artist based in Herefordshire, England

Martin Hanford (born 21 February 1974) is a British fantasy artist based in Herefordshire, England. In addition to painting album covers and T-shirt designs for a variety of heavy metal bands, including Bal-Sagoth, Twilight Force, Angantyr, Orange Goblin, Twisted Tower Dire, his work has featured on the covers of several novels published by Games Workshop and DMR Books, and on the cover and interiors of science fiction magazines including Interzone and The Future Fire. In addition to and private commissions, he has done various works for The Miskatonic Foundation and The Black Library as well as numerous bands and illustrations for gaming companies.
