= Jonny Maudling =

British musician

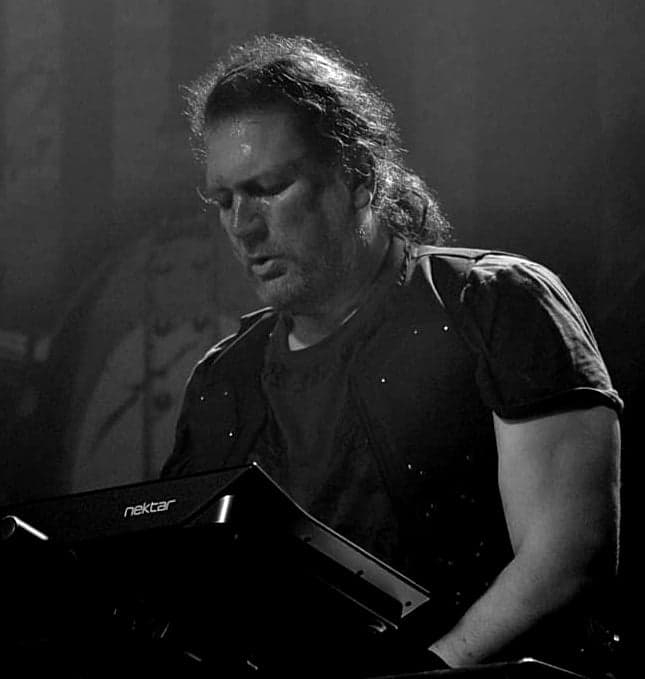

Background information
- Born: Jonathan Maudling
- Origin: Sidcup, Kent
- Genre: Metal/soundtrack/ambient
- Occupation: Composer/Musician/Sound Engineer
- Instruments: Keyboards/synthesizer, guitar, piano, drums
- Years active: 1988–present
- Website: www.facebook.com/pages/Waylands-Forge-Recording-Studio/129234190490863

Jonny Maudling (born Jonathan Maudling) is an English keyboard player and drummer,principal music composer for the UK symphonic metal band Bal-Sagoth. He is now the composer/ keyboardist with the band Kull, and has on occasion collaborated with the band My Dying Bride. Maudling's primary instruments are Roland synthesizers when playing live. He comes from a musical family and was classically trained on piano from an early age. He has contributed to three My Dying Bride studio albums, provided session orchestration on material by Sermon of Hypocrisy, played guest keyboards on a full-length release by the Ukrainian metal band Semargl, and played keyboards on the 2023 album "Katharsis" by Norwegian extreme metal band Keep of Kalessin. He also composed music for the unreleased video game Adellion. Currently Maudling is a producer and engineer, operating his own recording studio called Wayland's Forge Studios in Yorkshire, England.

Although he composes music mostly in the symphonic metal/black metal genres, Maudling's main influences include mostly non-metal bands such as The Police, Tangerine Dream, Queen, Pat Metheny, as well as classical composers such as Wagner, Stravinsky, Tchaikovsky, Messiaen and Holst.

== Keyboard equipment ==
Maudling has used various keyboards and synthesizers over the years including Casio CZ-1000, Yamaha Dx21, Korg M1, Roland XP-50 and Roland Fantom X7, Korg Kronos X.
