= Revolution DNA =

Studio album by Septic Flesh
- Released: 11 October 1999
- Recorded: 1999
- Studio: Studio Fredman (Sweden)
- Genres: Gothic metal, industrial death metal
- Length: 59:48
- Label: Holy Records
- Producers: Fredrik Nordström, Septic Flesh

Septic Flesh chronology
A Fallen Temple (1998)	Revolution DNA (1999)	Sumerian Daemons (2003)

Alternative cover
- 2005 "Red Box" reissue

Revolution DNA is the fifth studio album by the Greek death metal band Septic Flesh. This album shows the band continuing their mixture of death metal with even stronger gothic rock elements than before, while also introducing elements of industrial. The album also puts a much larger emphasis on clean vocals than any other Septic Flesh album, along with death growls being largely replaced by a less intense, spoken-rasped style.

Also, this is the first Septicflesh release since 1991's "Temple of the Lost Race" to feature a human drummer.

== Track listing ==
All lyrics are written by Sotiris Vayenas; all music is composed by Vayenas, except where noted.

No.	Title	Music	Length
1.	"Science"	Spiros Antoniou, Vayenas	4:23
2.	"Chaostar"		5:11
3.	"Radioactive"		3:07
4.	"Little Music Box"	Spiros A.	5:30
5.	"Revolution"		4:07
6.	"Nephilim Sons"		5:16
7.	"DNA"		3:19
8.	"Telescope"		4:19
9.	"Last Stop to Nowhere"	Christos Antoniou	5:38
10.	"Dictatorship of the Mediocre"	Spiros A.	4:16
11.	"Android"	Spiros A.	5:52
12.	"Arctic Circle"		4:33
13.	"Age of New Messiahs"		4:17

2005 reissue bonus tracks
No.	Title	Length
14.	"Misery's King"	3:59
15.	"The Thief of Innocence"	4:44
16.	"Telescope" (French version)	4:21

Japanese edition bonus tracks
No.	Title	Length
14.	"Woman of the Rings" (Remastered)	6:37
15.	"The Eldest Cosmonaut" (Video Remix)	4:24

== Personnel ==
- Spiros A. – bass, lead vocals, artwork & layout
- Sotiris V. – guitars, vocals
- Christos A. – guitars, samplers
- Akis K. – drums
- Fredrik Nordström – sound engineering, production
- The Mastering Room – mastering
- Chris Kissadjekian - photos
- Vangelis Rassias (Studio Rassias) - band photos
