= Beheading the Liars =

Studio album by Skiltron
- Released: May 2008
- Recorded: La Nave de Oseberg
- Genre: Folk metal

Skiltron chronology
The Clans Have United (2006)	Beheading the Liars (2008)	The Highland Way (2010)

Beheading the Liars is Skiltron's second studio album, recorded in January 2008 at La Nave de Oseberg studios. The album features very special guests: Steve Ramsey, Kevin Ridley, and Georgina Biddle from Skyclad, Jonne Järvelä from Korpiklaani, and Patrick Lafforegue and Patrcie Roques from Stille Volk, plus the collaboration of Seoras Wallace, from Clan Wallace.

== Track listing ==
- 1. "Skiltron" (5:43)
- 2. "The Beheading" (4:32)
- 3. "I'm What You've Done" (4:20)
- 4. "Praying is Nothing" (3:57)
- 5. "Calling Out" (4:21)
- 6. "The Vision of Blind Harry" (6:32)
- 7. "Hate Dance" (2:07)
- 8. "Signs, Symbols and the Marks of Man" (3:54)
- 9. "Let the Spirit Be" (3:54)
- 10. "Fast and Wild" (3:27)
- 11. "Crides" ("Calling Out" – Occitan version) (4:03)

== Personnel ==
- Diego Valdez - vocals
- Emilio Souto - guitars
- Juan José Fornés - guitars
- Fernando Marty − bass
- Matias Pena − drums
- Pablo Allen − bagpipes
- Diego Spinelli - tin whistle

=== Additional musicians ===
- Seoras Wallace - spoken vocals on track 1
- Jonne Jarvela - vocals on track 4
- Steve Ramsey - guitar on track 8
- Kevin Ridley - vocals on track 8
- Georgina Biddle- violin on track 8
