= The Great Mass =

Studio album by Septicflesh
- Released: 18 April 2011
- Recorded: July–September 2010
- Studio: Devasoundz Studios (Athens, Greece), Studio Abyss (Ludvika, Sweden), Smecky Studios (Prague, Czech Republic)
- Genre: Symphonic death metal
- Length: 43:35
- Label: Season of Mist
- Producer: Peter Tägtgren, Septic Flesh

Septicflesh chronology
Communion (2008)	The Great Mass (2011)	Titan (2014)

Alternative cover
- Jewel case version

Singles from The Great Mass
- 1. "The Vampire from Nazareth" Released: December 24, 2010

Professional ratings
Review scores
Source	Rating
Chronicles of Chaos	9.5/10
Rock'n'World	5.7/10
Sputnikmusic	4.5/5 stars
Angry Metal Guy	4/5 stars
Metal Storm	9/10
Ultimate Guitar Archive	9.2/10
Subexistance	9/10
Lords of Metal	95%
Revolver	2/5 stars

The Great Mass is the eighth studio album by Greek death metal band Septicflesh. It was recorded between July–September 2010 in Devasoundz (Greece) and The Abyss (Sweden) and produced by Peter Tägtgren. The orchestration was written by Christos Antoniou and recorded by the Prague Philharmonic Orchestra. Upon release, The Great Mass received universal acclaim from critics. In 2021, it was elected by Metal Hammer as the 9th best symphonic metal album of all time.

== Track listing ==
All lyrics written by Sotiris V., all music composed by Septicflesh, symphonic tracks performed by the Prague Philharmonic Orchestra.

No.	Title	Length
1.	"The Vampire from Nazareth"	4:08
2.	"A Great Mass of Death"	4:46
3.	"Pyramid God"	5:13
4.	"Five-Pointed Star"	4:33
5.	"Oceans of Grey"	5:11
6.	"The Undead Keep Dreaming"	4:29
7.	"Rising"	3:16
8.	"Apocalypse"	3:55
9.	"Mad Architect"	3:36
10.	"Therianthropy"	4:28

== Personnel ==
Septicflesh

- Christos Antoniou - lead guitar, orchestrations
- Sotiris Anunnaki V - clean vocals, rhythm guitar
- Seth Siro Anton - Brutal vocals, bass, artwork
- Fotis Benardo - drums, percussion

Additional musicians

- Philharmonic Orchestra And Choir Of Prague
  - Stanislav Mistr - choir master
  - Adam Klemens - orchestra conductor
- Androniki Skoula (Chaostar) - mezzo-soprano
- Iliana Tsakiraki (Enemy Of Reality) - soprano
- George Diamantopoulos (Chaostar) - kaval, yaylı tambur

Production

- Fotis Benardo - sound engineering
- George Emmanuel - sound engineering
- Steve Venardo - sound engineering
- Jan Holzner - sound engineering
- Michal Hradisky - sound engineering
- Peter Tägtgren - producer, mixing
- Jonas Kjellgren - mastering
- Jon Simvonis - photography
- Petr Pycha - music contractor, recording manager

== Charts ==
Chart (2011)	Peak position
French Albums (SNEP)	132

== Release history ==
Formats	Region	Date	Label
CD	Europe	April 18, 2011	Season of Mist
CD	North America	April 19, 2011	Season of Mist
CD	Japan	September 21, 2011	Nippon Columbia
