= Mystic Places of Dawn =

Studio album by Septic Flesh
- Released: May 1994
- Recorded: January – February 1994
- Genre: Death-doom
- Length: 55:03
- Labels: Holy; Season of Mist (Reissue)
- Producers: Septic Flesh, M. W. Daoloth

Septic Flesh chronology
Temple of the Lost Race (1991)	Mystic Places of Dawn (1994)	Esoptron (1995)

Alternative cover
- 2002 digipak reissue

Professional ratings
Review scores
Source	Rating
Peek from the Pit	7/10 stars

Mystic Places of Dawn is the first album by Septic Flesh, released in 1994.

== History ==
The album was reissued in 2002 with the Temple of the Lost Race EP as bonus tracks and then again in 2013 by Seasons of Mist. Though someone named "Jim" is credited for drums, in fact all drums were programmed, with the exception of "Morpheus (the Dreamlord)", which features drumming by Nick Adams (who also performed session work for the Greek black metal act Necromantia).

The cover art on the original vinyl edition is the only one of Septic Flesh's cover arts to not have been done by bassist/vocalist Spiros Antoniou; it was made by Boris Vallejo.

== Track listing ==
All lyrics written by Sotiris V.

No.	Title	Writer(s)	Length
1.	"Mystic Places of Dawn"	Sotiris V.	6:12
2.	"Pale Beauty of the Past"	Sotiris V.	5:56
3.	"Return to Carthage"	Sotiris V.	3:38
4.	"Crescent Moon"	Spiros A., Sotiris V.	8:24
5.	"Chasing the Chimera"	Spiros A., Sotiris V.	4:50
6.	"The Underwater Garden"	Sotiris V.	6:50
7.	"Behind the Iron Mask"	Spiros A., Sotiris V.	3:11
8.	"(Morpheus) the Dreamlord"	Spiros A., Sotiris V., Christos A.	6:52
9.	"Mythos (Part I: Elegy - Part II: Time Unbounded)"	Sotiris V., Christos A.	8:48

2002 and 2013 reissues bonus tracks
No.	Title	Writer(s)	Length
10.	"Erebus"	Sotiris V.	5:26
11.	"Another Reality"	Spiros A., Sotiris V., Christos A.	4:41
12.	"Temple of the Lost Race"	Spiros A., Sotiris V.	7:24
13.	"Setting of the Two Suns"	Spiros A., Christos A.	4:07

== Personnel ==
Septic Flesh – production

- Spiros A. – bass, vocals, reissue artwork
- Sotiris V. – guitars, vocals, keyboards
- Christos A. – guitars, keyboards (track 9)
- Jim – drums

Additional musicians

- Nick Adams – drums (track 8)
- Magus Wampyr Daoloth – additional howls (track 3)

Production

- George "Magus Wampyr Daoloth" Zaharopoulos – production, engineering (tracks 1 – 7, 9)
- Antonis Delaportas – production, engineering (track 8)
