= Ophidian Wheel =

Studio album by Septic Flesh
- Released: 1997
- Recorded: October – November 1996
- Studios: Praxis Studios (Athens, Greece)
- Genres: Death-doom, gothic metal
- Length: 51:37
- Labels: Holy Records; Season of Mist (Reissue)
- Producers: Septic Flesh, Lambros Sfiris

Septic Flesh chronology
Esoptron (1995)	Ophidian Wheel (1997)	A Fallen Temple (1998)

Ophidian Wheel is the third full-length album by the Greek death metal band Septicflesh. In 2013, a reissue containing bonus tracks and new artwork was released through Season of Mist.

Musically, this album is much more straightforward than previous albums, fusing an aggressive death metal style with elements of gothic rock. Though someone named "Kostas" is credited for drums, all drums on this album were programmed.

== Track listing ==
All lyrics written by Sotiris V.

No.	Title	Writer(s)	Length
1.	"The Future Belongs to the Brave"	Sotiris V.	6:13
2.	"The Ophidian Wheel"	Sotiris V.	5:19
3.	"Phallic Litanies"	Sotiris V.	5:55
4.	"Razor Blades of Guilt"	Spiros A.	5:02
5.	"Tartarus"	Christos A.	3:36
6.	"On the Topmost Step of the Earth"	Spiros A., Sotiris V.	6:42
7.	"Microcosmos"	Christos A.	1:35
8.	"Geometry in Static"	Sotiris V.	5:25
9.	"Shamanic Rite"	Sotiris V.	5:16
10.	"Heaven Below"	Sotiris V.	5:44
11.	"Enchantment"	Christos A.	0:50

2013 reissues bonus tracks
No.	Title	Writer(s)	Length
12.	"The Ophidian Wheel(unreleased mix)"	Sotiris V.	5:17
13.	"Phallic Litanies(unreleased mix)"	Sotiris V.	5:53
14.	"On The Topmost Step Of The Earth(unreleased mix)"	Spiros A., Sotiris V.	6:39

== Personnel ==
Septic Flesh

- Spiros A. – bass, vocals, artwork
- Sotiris V. – guitars, vocals, keyboards
- Christos A. – guitars, keyboards

Additional musicians

- Natalie Rassoulis – vocals
- Kostas – drums

Production

- Lambros Sfiris – production, engineering
