= A Fallen Temple =

Studio album by Septic Flesh
- Released: 1998
- Recorded: September–December 1997
- Studios: Praxis Studios in Athens, Greece
- Genres: Death-doom, gothic metal
- Length: 54:37
- Labels: Holy Records; Season of Mist (reissue)
- Producers: Septic Flesh, Lambros Sfiris

Septic Flesh chronology
| The Ophidian Wheel (1997) | A Fallen Temple (1998) | Revolution DNA (1999) |

A Fallen Temple is the fourth full-length album by the Greek death metal band Septic Flesh. In 2013, a reissue containing bonus tracks and new artwork was released.

== Track listing ==
All lyrics written by Sotiris V., except where noted

The New Order
| No. | Title | Music | Length |
|---|---|---|---|
| 1. | "Brotherhood of the Fallen Knights" | Sotiris V. | 5:13 |
| 2. | "The Eldest Cosmonaut" | Sotiris V. | 6:36 |
| 3. | "Marble Smiling Face" | Spiros A. | 4:28 |
| 4. | "Underworld – Act I" | Christos A. | 7:49 |

Testimonial
| No. | Title | Music | Length |
|---|---|---|---|
| 5. | "Temple of the Lost Race" | Spiros A., Sotiris V. | 4:37 |
| 6. | "The Crypt" | Sotiris V., Christos A., Spiros A. | 4:18 |
| 7. | "Setting of the Two Suns" | Christos A., Spiros A. | 3:50 |
| 8. | "Erebus" | Sotiris V. | 3:20 |

End of the Circle
| No. | Title | Music | Length |
|---|---|---|---|
| 9. | "Underworld – Act II" | Christos A. | 8:53 |
| 10. | "The Eldest Cosmonaut (Dark Mix)" | Sotiris V. | 5:32 |

2014 reissue bonus tracks
| No. | Title | Lyrics | Music | Length |
|---|---|---|---|---|
| 11. | "The Last Time" (Paradise Lost cover) | Nick Holmes | Gregor Mackintosh | 3:34 |
| 12. | "Underworld – Act III" | | Christos A. | 10:48 |
| 13. | "Finale" (Instrumental) | | Christos A. | 3:10 |
| 14. | "The Eldest Cosmonaut (Single Version)" | | Sotiris V. | 4:24 |

== Personnel ==
Septic Flesh – producer

- Spiros Antoniou – bass, lead vocals, artwork
- Sotiris V. – guitars, vocals, keyboards
- Christos Antoniou – guitars, keyboards

Additional musicians

- Natalie Rassoulis – female vocals
- Kostas Tzanokostakis – clean vocals
- Kostas – drums (session)

Production

- Lambros Sfiris – producer, engineering
