= Esoptron =

Studio album by Septic Flesh
- Released: May 1995
- Recorded: March – April 1995
- Studios: Storm Studio (Athens, Greece)
- Genre: Death-doom
- Length: 43:39
- Labels: Holy Records; Season of Mist (Reissue)
- Producers: Septic Flesh, M. W. Daoloth

Septic Flesh chronology
Mystic Places of Dawn (1994)	Esoptron (1995)	The Ophidian Wheel (1997)

Alternative cover
- Re-release edition cover art

Esoptron (stylized ΕΣΟΠΤΡΟΝ or Έσοπτρον, the Greek word for "(inner) mirror") is the second full-length album by Septic Flesh, released in 1995 and reissued in June 2013 by Season of Mist.

This album is considered Septic Flesh's most experimental and progressive release. It is the only Septic Flesh album not to feature guitarist/composer Christos Antoniou, who took a leave of absence from the band during this period. Though someone named "Kostas" is credited as a session drummer, all drums were programmed.

== Track listing ==
All lyrics are written by Sotiris V.; all music is composed by Sotiris V., except where noted.

No.	Title	Length
1.	"Breaking the Inner Seal"	0:50
2.	"Esoptron"	5:19
3.	"Burning Phoenix"	4:39
4.	"Astral Sea"	0:30
5.	"Rain"	3:40
6.	"Ice Castle"	5:54
7.	"Celebration"	0:53
8.	"Succubus Priestess"	4:11
9.	"So Clean, So Empty"	3:57
10.	"The Eyes of Set"	4:50
11.	"Narcissism"	8:54

2013 reissue bonus tracks
No.	Title	Music	Length
12.	"Woman of the Rings (Remastered)"		6:36
13.	"Crescent Moon (Live in Lille 1999)"	Sotiris V., Spiros A.	6:13
14.	"Brotherhood of the Fallen Knights (Live in Lille 1999)"		4:43

== Personnel ==
Septic Flesh – production

- Spiros A. – bass, vocals, artwork
- Sotiris V. – guitars, vocals, keyboards

Additional musicians

- Kostas – drums (session)

Production

- George "Magus Wampyr Daoloth" Zaharopoulos – production, engineering
