= Yearning (band) =

Finnish doom metal band

- Origin: Riihimäki, Finland
- Genres: Doom metal, atmospheric metal, gothic metal, progressive doom metal
- Years active: 1994–2010
- Label: Holy Records
- Past members: Juhani Palomäki; Toni Kristian; Tero Kalliomäki; Mr. Woodland; Lady Tiina Ahonen; Aki Kuusinen

Yearning was an atmospheric doom metal band from Finland. During its career the band released five studio albums and one demo, the latter being released while the band was still called Flegeton.

== History ==
Yearning was formed in 1994 under the name "Flegeton". The original line-up consisted of Juhani Palomäki on guitars and vocals and Toni Kristian on drums. The band started to write original music, and was joined by Tero Kalliomäki as a guitarist. Flegeton made a 4-track tape titled "Through the Desolate Lands", but it was never widely distributed.

In July 1995, Flegeton, with a new bass player, Petri Salo (a.k.a. Mr. Woodland), went into MDM studios to record their demo The Temple of Sagal. The demo received the attention of the French record company Holy Records, which Flegeton contracted with for two full-length studio albums.

In February 1996, the band went into Tico-Tico Studios to record some new material. At this point, the band was renamed Yearning, since they believed that their old name did not fit their music anymore. They also recorded the song "Autumn Funeral" during these sessions. "Autumn Funeral" appears on the Holy Records sampler album The Holy Bible.

Between September 16 and September 29, 1996, Yearning recorded their first album, With Tragedies Adorned in Tico-Tico Studios. The album was engineered and produced by Ahti Kortelainen. The album was released on February 28, 1997; during the following spring, the band was busy promoting the album and performing live.

The band went into the same studio again on October 18 and October 19, 1997, to record a cover of the Paradise Lost song "Eternal" which would appear on a Paradise Lost tribute album released by Holy Records. Afterwards, Yearning did their first European tour in December 1997 and January 1998. They toured along with the bands Nightfall and SUP.

In August and September 1998, Yearning entered Tico-Tico studios again to record their second studio album, Plaintive Scenes. It would eventually be released in February 1999. The year 1999 would also mark the departure of three members, guitarist Tero Kalliomäki, bassist Mr. Woodland, and flutist and female vocalist Lady Tiina Ahonen. They left because of personal and musical disagreements. After several big fights, Yearning's line-up was reduced to Juhani Palomäki handling vocal, guitar, bass guitar, and keyboard duties, while Toni Kristian was still on percussion.

The stripped line-up went into Tico Tico Studios in May 2000 to record their third studio album Frore Meadow. Along with the change in line-up, the music changed as well, taking more influence from progressive rock, gothic metal, and classical music. Frore Meadow was released through Holy Records on January 15, 2001. Due to changes in line-up, Yearning had to recruit musicians to play live, ending up with Matti S. on guitar, Jani Loikas on bass, and Jouni Jormanainen (Jouni Huttunen since 2007) on keyboards. The live line-up would remain unchanged for the next nine years. In 2001 Yearning also toured France with labelmates Gloomy Grim and Misanthrope.

Yearning did not perform actively during 2002 but new material was composed and arranged during this time. The outcome would result in Yearning's fourth studio album, Evershade. The album was recorded during June 2003 in Astia Studios with Anssi Kippo as a co-producer. Evershade was released at the end of September 2003. Yearning performed live twice after the release of this album: one concert in Helsinki, and another in their hometown Riihimäki.

With the release of Evershade, the contract with Holy Records came to an end, leaving Yearning without a record company. The band negotiated with several labels, including Holy Records, on upcoming releases, but many of these negotiations were unproductive and none led to a satisfactory result. During this time Yearning was rather inactive, performing live only occasionally. Yet, new material was being written and contract negotiations were being held. Toni Kristian was replaced with Aki Kuusinen and a one-album contract offer from Holy Records was accepted.

With a new contract secured, Yearning headed into D-studio in Klaukkala, Finland with musical engineer Olli Haaranen (also known as the guitarist for Colosseum) to record their fifth studio album Merging into Landscapes. Recording took place between March 3 and March 23, 2007. The album was mixed by Jarno Hänninen and mastered at Elektra Mastering. Guest musicians on the album included Tiina Sitomaniemi, who sang also on Plaintive Scenes, and Tuukka Koskinen, lead vocalist of Saattue and Let Me Dream. Merging into Landscapes was released July 1, 2007.

Juhani Palomäki died on May 15, 2010. Since Juhani was the only remaining full-time founding member of the band, the other members, official or live, decided not to perform as Yearning nor play Yearning material without Juhani.

== Line-up ==
=== Final line-up ===
- Juhani Palomäki – vocals, guitars (1994–2010), bass guitar, keyboards (1999–2010)
- Aki Kuusinen – drums, percussion (c.2005 – 2010)

=== Former members ===
- Toni Kostiainen (aka Toni Kristian) – drums, percussion (1994 – c.2005)
- Tero Kalliomäki – guitar (1994–1999)
- Petri Salo (aka Mr. Woodland) – bass guitar (1995–1999)
- Lady Tiina Ahonen – flute, female vocals (c.1996 – 1999)

=== Live musicians ===
- Matti S. – guitar (2001–2010)
- Jani Loikas – bass (2001–2010)
- Jouni Huttunen – keyboards (2001–2010)

== Discography ==
=== As Flegeton ===
- The Temple of Sagal (demo, 1995)

=== As Yearning ===
- With Tragedies Adorned (full-length, 1997)
- Plaintive Scenes (full-length, 1999)
- Frore Meadow (full-length, 2001)
- Evershade (full-length, 2003)
- Merging into Landscapes (full-length, 2007)
