= Leçons de Ténèbres =

Leçons de Ténèbres may refer to:

- Leçons de ténèbres, a genre of French baroque music
- Leçons de ténèbres (Couperin), music in this genre by François Couperin
- Leçons de Ténèbres (album), an album by neoclassical band Elend
