= Sumerian Daemons =

Sixth studio album by the Greek death metal band Septicflesh

Studio album by Septic Flesh
- Released: 18 February 2003
- Recorded: May–June 2002
- Studio: Studio Fredman (Sweden)
- Genres: Blackened death metal, symphonic metal, industrial metal
- Length: 56:06
- Label: Hammerheart
- Producer: Fredrik Nordström

Septic Flesh chronology
Revolution DNA (1999)	Sumerian Daemons (2003)	Communion (2008)

Professional ratings
Review scores
Source	Rating
Metalstorm.net	9.5/10 stars

Sumerian Daemons is the sixth studio album by the Greek death metal band Septicflesh. It was released by Hammerheart Records in 2003. It was originally the band's final album before they disbanded later the same year, until they reformed in 2007.

The cover art for the album was a real background constructed in accordance with Spiros' instructions by a Greek FX team, the Alahouzos Bros, that usually works for films and advertisements.

The song "Unbeliever" uses two quotes from the horror movie Evil Dead II: "Demon resurrection passages from The Book of the Dead" and "Two hours since I've translated and spoken aloud the demon resurrection passages from The Book of the Dead".

== Track listing ==
All lyrics are written by Sotiris V.

No.	Title	Writer(s)	Length
1.	"Behold... the Land of Promise"	Christos A.	2:10
2.	"Unbeliever"	Spiros A.	4:52
3.	"Virtues of the Beast"	Spiros A.	5:17
4.	"Faust"	Christos A.	5:09
5.	"When All is None"	Spiros A.	4:38
6.	"Red Code Cult"	Sotiris V.	4:09
7.	"Dark River"	Spiros A., Sotiris V., Christos A.	3:56
8.	"Magic Loves Infinity"	Sotiris V.	3:58
9.	"Sumerian Daemon"	Spiros A.	4:04
10.	"Mechanical Babylon"	Spiros A.	4:55
11.	"Infernal Sun"	Sotiris V.	3:26
12.	"The Watchers"	Sotiris V.	4:14
13.	"Shapeshifter"	Christos A.	5:12

== Personnel ==
- Septic Flesh – production
  - Seth/Spiros A. – bass, lead vocals, artwork
  - Sotiris V. – guitar
  - Christos A. – guitar, samplers, orchestration
  - Akis K. – drums
  - George Z. – keyboards
- Natalie Rassoulis – soprano
- Gore – backing vocals on "Unbeliever"
- Fredrik Nordström – production, engineering
- Patrik J. – sound engineering
- Hammerheart Records – executive production
