= IrremeDIABLE =

Studio album by Misanthrope
- Released: January 21, 2008
- Recorded: at "Studios Davout" and "Manoir Des Déportés", both in (Paris, France)
- Genre: Progressive death metal, avant garde metal
- Length: 70:00
- Label: Holy Records
- Producer: Fernando Pereira Lopes

Misanthrope chronology
Metal Hurlant (2005)	IrremeDIABLE (2008)	Ænigma Mystica (2013)

IrremeDIABLE is the ninth studio album by the French band Misanthrope. It is also the first concept album by the band, being based on the life and works of Charles Baudelaire. This album was released in two versions: the single CD, and a limited deluxe box containing a CD and a DVD. A video-clip of "Névrose" was made as well.

== Track listing ==
No.	Title	Length
1.	"Les Retourneurs de pierres"	5:21
2.	"Phénakistiscope"	5:11
3.	"Les Limbes"	4:49
4.	"Le Passager du hasard"	4:37
5.	"L'Infinie Violence des abîmes"	4:01
6.	"Prodigalité"	2:24
7.	"Le Dandy de Bohème"	3:41
8.	"Fantasia artificielle"	6:00
9.	"Le Maudit et son spleen"	6:28
10.	"Plaisirs saphiques"	4:37
11.	"Névrose"	3:51
12.	"1857"	6:11
13.	"Ixion"	4:52
14.	"L'Oracle de la déchéance"	5:34
15.	"LXXXIV L'IrréméDIABLE"	2:38
