= Codex Omega =

Studio album by Septicflesh
- Released: September 1, 2017
- Genre: Symphonic death metal
- Length: 47:15
- Labels: Season of Mist, Prosthetic, Ward
- Producers: Jens Bogren, Septicflesh

Septicflesh chronology
Titan (2014)	Codex Omega (2017)	Modern Primitive (2022)

Singles from Codex Omega
- 1. "Dante's Inferno" Released: June 15, 2017; 2. "3rd Testament" Released: July 18, 2017; 3. "Enemy of Truth" Released: August 25, 2017

Codex Omega is the tenth studio album by Greek death metal band Septicflesh, released on September 1, 2017, through Season of Mist.

== Track listing ==
All lyrics written by Sotiris V., all music composed by Septicflesh.

No.	Title	Length
1.	"Dante's Inferno"	5:34
2.	"3rd Testament (Codex Omega)"	4:08
3.	"Portrait of a Headless Man"	5:00
4.	"Martyr"	5:07
5.	"Enemy of Truth"	4:55
6.	"Dark Art"	5:24
7.	"Our Church, Below the Sea"	3:59
8.	"Faceless Queen"	5:20
9.	"The Gospels of Fear"	3:41
10.	"Trinity"	4:07
Total length:		47:15

Orchestral bonus tracks
No.	Title	Length
11.	"Martyr of Truth"	11:36
12.	"Dark Testament"	7:51
13.	"Portrait of a Headless Man"	5:01
Total length:		1:11:43

== Personnel ==
Septicflesh

- Christos Antoniou – lead guitar, orchestrations, production
- Sotiris Anunnaki V – rhythm guitar, twelve-string guitar, clean vocals, production
- Seth Siro Anton – bass, unclean vocals, artwork, production
- Kerim "Krimh" Lechner – drums, percussion, production

Additional personnel

- FILMharmonic Orchestra – orchestra
- Adam Klemens – orchestra conductor
- Nikos Tsachalinas, Romanos Papadimitriou – bass vocals
- Christina Alexiou, Flora Tzini – soprano vocals
- Margarita Papadimitriou – soprano vocals, choir conductor
- Vahan Galstyan – duduk
- Giannis Poupoulis – oud
- Terry Nikas – engineering
- Jan Holzner – orchestra engineering
- Jens Bogren – mixing, mastering, production
- Linus Corneliusson – additional mixing

== Charts ==
Chart (2017)	Peak position
Belgian Albums (Ultratop Flanders)	112
Belgian Albums (Ultratop Wallonia)	114
French Albums (SNEP)	85
