= Titan (album) =

Studio album by Septicflesh
- Released: June 20, 2014
- Recorded: September – October 2013
- Studio: Devasoundz Studios (Athens, Greece), Smecky Studios (Prague, Czech Republic)
- Genre: Symphonic death metal
- Length: 45:24
- Label: Season of Mist, Prosthetic Records, Ward Records
- Producer: Logan Mader, Septic Flesh

Septicflesh chronology
The Great Mass (2011)	Titan (2014)	Codex Omega (2017)

Singles from Titan
- 1. "Order of Dracul" Released: April 15, 2014

Alternative cover
- LP edition cover art

Professional ratings
Review scores
Source	Rating
Revolver	2.5/5 stars
About.com	4/5 stars
Metal Sucks	3.5/5 stars
Loudwire	4.5/5 stars

Titan is the ninth studio album by Greek death metal band Septicflesh, released on June 20, 2014 through Season of Mist. At its release, the album was met with generally positive reviews by critics and fans, even if less favourable than the band's two previous albums.

== Track listing ==
All lyrics written by Sotiris V., all music composed by Septicflesh.

No.	Title	Length
1.	"War in Heaven"	5:41
2.	"Burn"	3:16
3.	"Order of Dracul"	3:33
4.	"Prototype"	5:37
5.	"Dogma"	4:03
6.	"Prometheus"	6:35
7.	"Titan"	3:55
8.	"Confessions of a Serial Killer"	4:51
9.	"Ground Zero"	3:54
10.	"The First Immortal"	3:57

== Personnel ==
Septicflesh

- Christos Antoniou - lead guitar, orchestrations
- Sotiris Anunnaki V - rhythm guitar, clean vocals
- Seth Siro Anton - bass, unclean vocals, artwork
- Fotis Benardo - drums, percussion, sound engineering

Additional musicians

- FILMharmonic Orchestra, Children Choir Of Prague
  - Adam Klemens - orchestra conductor
- Choir
  - Antonia Tzitzika, Babis Alexandropoulos, Eleni Konstantaki,
  - Fotini Athanasaki, Giannis Stamatakis, Kostas Zampounis,
  - Lito Messini, Lydia Zervanou, Maria Vlachopoulou,
  - Panagiotis Priftis, Thodoris Aivaliotis, Vasilis Asimakopoulos

Production

- Logan Mader - producer, mixing, mastering
- Gerard Marino - orchestral arrangements pre-mixing
- Jan Holzner - sound engineering
- Steve Venardo - drum tracking
- Petr Pycha - music contractor, recording supervisor
- Corn Studio - artwork
- Alex Logos - costumes
- Ioanna Symeonidi - makeup artist, photography
- Ioanna Metaxa - makeup artist, photography
- Prokopis Vlaseros FX Studio - costumes
- Marios Theologis - photography
- Jon Simvonis - photography

== Charts ==
Chart (2014)	Peak position
Belgian Albums (Ultratop Flanders)	191
Belgian Albums (Ultratop Wallonia)	99
Finnish Albums (Suomen virallinen lista)	37
French Albums (SNEP)	112
US Top Heatseekers (Billboard)	7

== Release history ==
Formats	Region	Date	Label
CD	Japan	June 18, 2014	Ward Records
CD	Europe	June 20, 2014	Season of Mist
CD	North America	June 23, 2014	Prosthetic Records
