= A World in Their Screams =

Studio album by Elend
- Released: April 23, 2007
- Recorded: Late 2005, Studio des moines
- Genre: Neoclassical
- Length: 57:44
- Labels: Holy Records, Prophecy Productions
- Producer: Elend

Elend chronology
Sunwar the Dead (2004)	A World in Their Screams (2007)

A World in Their Screams is the seventh album by neoclassical band Elend, and the third and final album in the Winds Cycle.

Originally planned for release in the first quarter of 2006, it was announced on May 10, 2006 that the album's release would be delayed until late 2006 or early 2007 due to difficulties in the mixing process and a dispute between Elend and the record label. The album was finally released on April 23, 2007.

== Track listing ==
1. "Ophis puthôn" — (5:59) (Python Snake)
2. "A World in Their Screams" — (6:21)
3. "Ondes de sang" — (2:55) (Waves of Blood)
4. "Le Dévoreur" — (5:53) (The Devourer)
5. "Le Fleuve infini des morts" — (4:21) (The Unending Stream of the Dead)
6. "Je rassemblais tes membres" — (7:46) (I Gathered Your Limbs)
7. "Stasis" — (5:07)
8. "Borée" — (4:40) (Boreas)
9. "La Carrière d'ombre" — (4:43) (The Quarry of Darkness)
10. "J'ai touché aux confins de la mort" — (4:28) (I Have Touched the Boundaries of Death)
11. "Urserpens" – (5:25)

== Credits ==
- Esteri Rémond---solo soprano
- Laura Angelmayer---soprano, vocal effects
- Mélanie Desquier, Sylvain Faure, Esteri Rémond, Anna Maria Sarasto---choir
- David Kempf---solo violin, first violin, solo viola, conductor
- Sylvain Daumard, Émilie Dunand, Elsa Saulnier---all other violins
- Shinji Chihara, David Choreman, Judith Thomas---violas
- Vincent Catulescu, Christian Dourinat, Franck Tessier---cellos
- Raymond Lebars, Arnaud Pioncet---basses
- Camille Drillon, Samuel Gresch---clarinets
- Klaus Amann, Jean-Michel Coste---trumpets
- Samir Husseini, Philippe Laumond---French horns
- Arnaud Pasquier---trombone
- René Adam---bass trombone
- Marc Bertaud---orchestral percussion
- Simon Eberl---industrial devices
- All other instruments and vocals, sound-design and programming by Iskandar Hasnawi, Sébastien Roland and Renaud Tschirner.
