= Ænigma Mystica =

Studio album by Misanthrope
- Released: January 14, 2013
- Genre: Progressive Death Metal
- Label: Holy Records
- Producer: Fernando Pereira Lopes

Misanthrope chronology
IrremeDIABLE (2008)	Ænigma Mystica (2013)	Alpha X Omega (2017)

Ænigma Mystica is the tenth studio album studio from French death metal act Misanthrope. It comes in a regular version exclusively in French and a two disk deluxe edition with the French disk, English versions of chosen tracks as well as other re-recorded songs from past albums.

== Track listing ==
No.	Title	Length
1.	"L'Art chorégraphique de la transe"	4:55
2.	"Forces conspiratrices"	4:47
3.	"La Bonté du roi pour son peuple"	6:03
4.	"Les Ombres de Dante"	5:02
5.	"L'Arborescence du lys"	4:47
6.	"Desponsation"	6:00
7.	"Gigantomachie"	5:24
8.	"Nouvelle Parole"	4:52
9.	"Charmantes Castratrices"	5:17
10.	"Suis-je misandre ?"	7:09
11.	"Lycaon (Omophagie Communiante)"	4:22
12.	"Ænigma Mystica"	7:23

Limited Edition Bonus Disk

No.	Title	Length
1.	"Conspiracy Forces"
2.	"Dante's Shadows"
3.	"Sacred Human Omophagy"
4.	"Charming Castration"
5.	"Holy Betrothal"
6.	"The Tree Of Vice"
7.	"Gigantomachy"
8.	"Miserable Misanthrope"
9.	"Neurosis"
10.	"Exaltation Of The Cross"
11.	"King Saint-Louis"
12.	"Ænigma Mystica"

Limited Edition Bonus DVD

No.	Title	Length
1.	"Lycaon (Omophagie Communiante)"
2.	"Making Of Ænigma Mystica"
3.	"La Bonté du Roi pour son Peuple (Live)"
4.	"Le Maudit et son Spleen (Live)"
5.	"Exaltation de la Croix (Live)"
6.	"Ixion (Live)"
7.	"Névrose (Live)"
8.	"Charmantes Castratrices (Live)"
9.	"Les Retourneurs de Pierres (Live)"
10.	"Tranchées 1914"

== Personnel ==
Band Members

- S.A.S. de l'Argilière: Vocals
- Jean-Jacques Moréac: Bass & Keyboards
- Anthony Scemama: Guitars & Keyboards
- Gaël Féret: Drums

Production

- Fernando Pereira Lopes - production, engineering, mixing
- Bruno "L'Ensorcelé" Gruel - mastering
- Executive production by Holy Records & Aeternitas Musique
- Séverine Foujanet (Holy Records) - Cover artwork, layout and graphic arts
- Christophe Hargoues - Musicians' photography
- Jean-Jacques Moréac & S.A.S de l'Argilière - Artwork photography
