= Sunwar the Dead =

Sunwar the dead

Studio album by Elend
- Released: 2004
- Recorded: Studio des Moines, The Fall
- Genre: Neoclassical
- Length: 59:04
- Label: Holy Records, Prophecy Productions

Elend chronology
Winds Devouring Men (2003)	Sunwar the dead (2004)	A World in Their Screams (2007)

Professional ratings
Review scores
Source	Rating
Chronicles of Chaos	link
Metal Storm	link

Sunwar the Dead is an album by neoclassical band Elend. It is the second album in the Winds Cycle.

== Track listing ==
1. "Chaomphalos" — 4:24
2. "Ardour" — 5:10
3. "Sunwar the Dead" — 4:31
4. "Ares in Their Eyes" — 6:02
5. "The Hemlock Sea" — 5:40
6. "La terre n'aime pas le sang" — 5:00
7. "A Song of Ashes" — 6:34
8. "Laceration" — 5:04
9. "Poliorketika" — 4:32
10. "Blood and Grey Skies Entwined" — 6:00
11. "Threnos" — 6:00

== Musicians ==
=== Vocals ===
- Solo soprano: Esteri Rémond
- Female choir: Camille Balarie, Louise Legendre, Julia Michaelis, Chloé Nadeau, Esteri Rémond, Séverine Ronsard, Anna Maria Sarasto, Karine Sylvain

=== Strings ===
- Solo violin, first violin, solo viola, conductor: David Kempf

==== Violins ====
- First violins: Ismaël Guy, Inga Larusdottir, Elsa Saulnier
- Second violins: Sylvain Daumard, Hélène Hector, Sébastien Thaumon
- Third violins: Émilie Dunand, Étienne Philibert, Isabelle Robel

==== Violas ====
- First violas: Shinji Chihara, David Choreman, Mathieu Hilbert
- Second violas: Sandra Cardon, Judith Thomas, Emma Urbanek
- Third violas: Julie Corda, Alexandre Grimaud, Anne Tigier

==== Cellos ====
- First cellos: Vincent Catulescu, Catherine Fiolka
- Second cellos: Anne Fournier, Benjamin Rabenau
- Third cellos: Christian Dourinat, Éléonore Toinon

==== Basses ====
- Basses: Raymond Lebars, Yves Levignon, Arnaud Pioncet

=== Winds ===
- Nay flutes: Nizar Attawi
- Bass flute: Estelle Sandrard
- Oboe: Vladimir Jamet
- Bass clarinet: Michaël Hardy
- Trumpet, French horn: Klaus Amann
- French horns: Samir Husseini, Philippe Laumond
- Clarinets: Camille Drillon, Samuel Gresch
- Trombone: Arnaud Pasquier
- Bass trombone: René Adam

=== Percussion ===
- Timpani, Bass drums: Marc Bertaud
- Bass drums, snare drum: Alexandre Clément
- Cymbals, gongs, tam-tam: Paul Lantenot
- Various bells, steel drums, windchimes: Pierre Mangin
- Industrial devices: Simon Eberl

All other instruments (flutes, prepared piano, spinet and other keyboards, santur, percussion) and vocals, sound-design and programming by Iskandar Hasnawi, Sébastien Roland and Renaud Tschirner.
