= Communion (Septicflesh album) =

Studio album by Septicflesh
- Released: March 17, 2008
- Recorded: September 2007
- Studios: Studio Fredman (Arboga, Sweden)
- Genres: Symphonic metal, blackened death metal
- Length: 38:10
- Label: Season of Mist
- Producers: Fredrik Nordström, Septic Flesh

Septicflesh chronology
Sumerian Daemons (2003)	Communion (2008)	The Great Mass (2011)

Alternative cover
- Limited edition digipack

Communion is the seventh studio album by Greek death metal band Septicflesh. It was released on March 17, 2008 worldwide, and March 25, 2008 in the United States, both dates through the French label Season of Mist. The album is the first since the band's split up, after the release of Sumerian Daemons in 2003, and the first to be released under the name "Septicflesh" following the band's name change.

== Background and production ==
Septicflesh announced a reunion show at the Metal Healing Festival in their home country on February 19, 2007 and a new full-length on French label Season of Mist. Communion includes a full classical orchestra, arranged by guitarist Christos Antoniou, who has a master's degree in concert music from the London College of Music. The Prague Filmharmonic Orchestra recorded the compositions with 80 instrumentalists and a choir of 32 singers.

== Musical and lyrical themes ==
Communion combines the heaviness and brutality of death metal, with the obscure atmosphere of gothic metal, along with some influences of black metal. The album features a full orchestra and choir, with more than 100 musicians — adding a classical element to the songs — led by Chris Antoniou, who is responsible for the arrangements.

According to guitarist Sotiris Vayenas the album title means something like "communication with non-human entities."

This kind of strange fellowship is shrouded by mystery and reported during different eras and on various parts of the world. There are even sacred rites on many different religions to symbolize this "communication".

— Sotiris V.

The main theme of album is mythology, with elements from various ancient civilizations, including Egyptian, Hellenic and Sumerian.

Although there are some interconnections between some songs, Communion is not a concept album. I had so many things that I wanted to tell that I decided it would be better not to focus on only one theme.

— Sotiris V.

== Critical reception ==
Professional ratings
Review scores
Source	Rating
About.com	4/5 stars
Chronicles of Chaos	(9/10)

Communion received excellent reviews from music critics and Septicflesh's fans, with About.com reviewer Chad Bowar saying "The extreme elements of Septic Flesh are tempered with melody and contrasted nicely by the symphonic elements. The songwriting and arrangements are excellent. It's a great mix of tempos, intensities and atmospheres. From the beautiful to the brutal, Communion covers all the musical bases, and this is one of the best CDs Septic Flesh has done." Kostas Sarampalis of Chronicles of Chaos praised the album, stating "In short, Septic Flesh have come out of their coma in great shape with a fantastic album."

== Track listing ==
All lyrics written by Sotiris V., all music composed by Septicflesh.

No.	Title	Length
1.	"Lovecraft's Death"	4:08
2.	"Anubis"	4:17
3.	"Communion"	3:25
4.	"Babel's Gate"	2:57
5.	"We, The Gods"	3:49
6.	"Sunlight/Moonlight"	4:08
7.	"Persepolis"	6:08
8.	"Sangreal"	5:16
9.	"Narcissus"	3:59

Japanese edition bonus track
No.	Title	Length
10.	"Anubis" (Orchestral version)	3:56

== Personnel ==
Septicflesh

- Seth Siro Anton - lead vocals, bass, artwork
- Sotiris V. - clean vocals (tracks 2, 6-9), guitars
- Christos Antoniou - orchestrations, guitars, sampler
- Fotis Benardo - drums

Additional musicians

- Filmharmonic Orchestra And Choir Of Prague
- Marios Iliopoulos - guitar solo on "Babel's Gate"

Production

- Fredrik Nordström - producer, sound engineering
- Henric Udd - sound engineering
- Cenda Kotzmann - sound engineering assistant
- Jan Kotzmann - sound engineering
- Gabriel Currington - additional orchestrations, orchestra producer
- Peter In De Betou - mastering
- Jukka Tilli - photography

== Release history ==
Region	Date	Label	Format	Catalog
Worldwide	March 17, 2008	Season of Mist	Compact Disc	SOM 174
United States	March 25, 2008	Season of Mist	Compact Disc	SOM 174
