= Winds Devouring Men =

Studio album by Elend
- Released: 2003
- Recorded: The Fall
- Genre: Neoclassical
- Length: 60:20; 65:38
- Label: Holy Records, Prophecy Productions, Goimusic

Elend chronology
The Umbersun (1998)	Winds Devouring Men (2003)	Sunwar the Dead (2004)

Professional ratings
Review scores
Source	Rating
Allmusic	4/5 stars

Winds Devouring Men is the fifth album by neoclassical band Elend. It is the first album in the Winds Cycle trilogy. The special edition was released in a digipak with a bonus track called "Silent Slumber: A God That Breeds Pestilence".

This album is notable as a progression from earlier Elend work in that it does not rely on synthesizers and sequencing to achieve an orchestral sound — though there are still computerized effects, the majority of the music is played on acoustic instruments by chamber musicians.

== Track listing ==
1. "The Poisonous Eye" — 6:55
2. "Worn Out with Dreams" — 5:43
3. "Charis" — 5:58
4. "Under War-Broken Trees" — 5:36
5. "Away from Barren Stars" — 7:28
6. "Winds Devouring Men" — 4:38
7. "Vision Is All That Matters" — 5:59
8. "The Newborn Sailor" — 5:45
9. "The Plain Masks of Daylight" — 5:54
10. "A Staggering Moon" — 6:10
11. "Silent Slumber: A God That Breeds Pestilence" — 5:18*

* Bonus track on special edition.

== Musicians ==
- Klaus Amann: trumpet, horn, trombone
- Nathalie Barbary: soprano
- Shinji Chihara: violin, viola
- David Kempf: violin, solo violin
- Esteri Rémond: soprano
- All other instruments and vocals, sound-design and programming by Iskandar Hasnawi, Sébastien Roland and Renaud Tschirner.
- Industrial landscapes and noises captured by Simon Eberl and Renaud Tschirner, designed and programmed by Iskandar Hasnawi.
