= Weeping Nights =

Studio album by Elend
- Released: 1997
- Recorded: RMS Studios
- Genre: Neoclassical
- Length: 65:23
- Label: Holy Records

Elend chronology
Les Ténèbres du Dehors (1996)	Weeping Nights (1997)	The Umbersun (1998)

Professional ratings
Review scores
Source	Rating
Chronicles of Chaos	8/10 stars

Weeping Nights is the third album by neoclassical band Elend. Although released before The Umbersun, it is not a part of the Officium Tenebrarum trilogy. The album contains three original songs (the first track being of their own and the following two being adaptations of pieces by Henry Purcell), and six remixes of songs from their previous album, Les Ténèbres du Dehors. The remixed tracks are virtually exactly the same as on Les Ténèbres du Dehors, only all male vocals have been removed. The only two tracks from the previous album which do not appear here are "The Silence of Light" (track 5) and "Antienne" (track 6), presumably because they had no male vocals to begin with and because of limited space on the CD.

== Track listing ==
No.	Title	Length
1.	"Weeping Night"	7:08
2.	"O Solitude"	6:00
3.	"The Embrace"	3:51
4.	"Nocturne"	4:45
5.	"Ethereal Journeys"	14:28
6.	"The Luciferian Revolution"	10:57
7.	"Eden (The Angel in the Garden)"	3:47
8.	"Dancing under the Closed Eyes of Paradise"	9:35
9.	"Les Ténèbres du Dehors"	4:22
Total length:		65:23

== Musicians ==
All instruments and vocals performed by Nathalie Barbary, Iskandar Hasnawi and Renaud Tschirner.
