= Leçons de ténèbres (album) =

Studio album by Elend
- Released: 1994
- Studio: Melody Studio
- Genre: Neoclassical
- Length: 56:45
- Label: Holy Records

Elend chronology
Leçons de ténèbres (1994)	'Les Ténèbres du Dehors' (1996)

Leçons de ténèbres is the debut album of the neoclassical band Elend, released in 1994. It was the first in the Officium Tenebrarum trilogy.

The lyrics to four songs (Chanting, Into Bottomless Perdition, Lucifer and The Emperor) are texts adapted from John Milton's Paradise Lost.

== Track listing ==
1. "Leçon de ténèbres" — (3:31)
2. "Chanting" — (6:22)
3. "Into Bottomless Perdition" — (7:07)
4. "Deploration" — (5:41)
5. "Infernal Beauty" — (5:13)
6. "Lucifer" — (10:05)
7. "Eclipse" — (8:10)
8. "The Reign of Chaos and Old Night" — (5:00)
9. "The Emperor" — (5:29)

== Musicians ==
All instruments and vocals performed by Iskandar Hasnawi, Eve Gabrielle Siskind and Renaud Tschirner.
