= Chaostar =

Greek musical group

- Origin: Greece
- Genres: Opera, ambient, neoclassical dark wave, experimental
- Years active: 1998–present
- Labels: Holy Records, Season of Mist
- Members: Christos Antoniou; Androniki Skoula; George Diamantopoulos; Charalampos Paritsis; Nick Vell

Chaostar is a classical, opera and vocal orchestra from Greece which was founded in 1998. The members upon the inception of the band were Christos Antoniou, Spiros Antoniou, Sotiris Vayenas, Nathalie Rassoulis, and Sapfo Stavridou. Several members of the band are or at one point were also members of Septicflesh.

They have released four albums on Holy Records, a label with notable artists such as Elend, Orphaned Land, and Septicflesh.

== Discography ==
- Chaostar (2000)
- Threnody (2001)
- The Scarlet Queen (2004)
- Underworld (Compilation) (2007)
- Anomima (2013)
- The Undivided Light (2018)

== Members ==
Current members

- Christos Antoniou – guitars, piano, synthesizer, orchestral arrangements (1998–present)
- Androniki Skoula – mezzo-soprano (2009–present)
- George Diamantopoulos – traditional instruments (2012–present)
- Charalampos Paritsis – electric violin (2012–present)
- Nick Vell – percussions (2013–present)

Past members

- Spiros Antoniou – bass, grunts (1998–2004)
- Sotiris Vayenas – guitars, clean vocals (1998–2004)
- Nathalie Rassoulis – soprano (1998–2004)
- Sapfo Stavridou – vocals (2006–2007)
- Dionisis Christodoulatos – keyboards (2013)
- Fotis Benardo – drums (2012–2014)
