= Septicflesh =

Greek death metal band

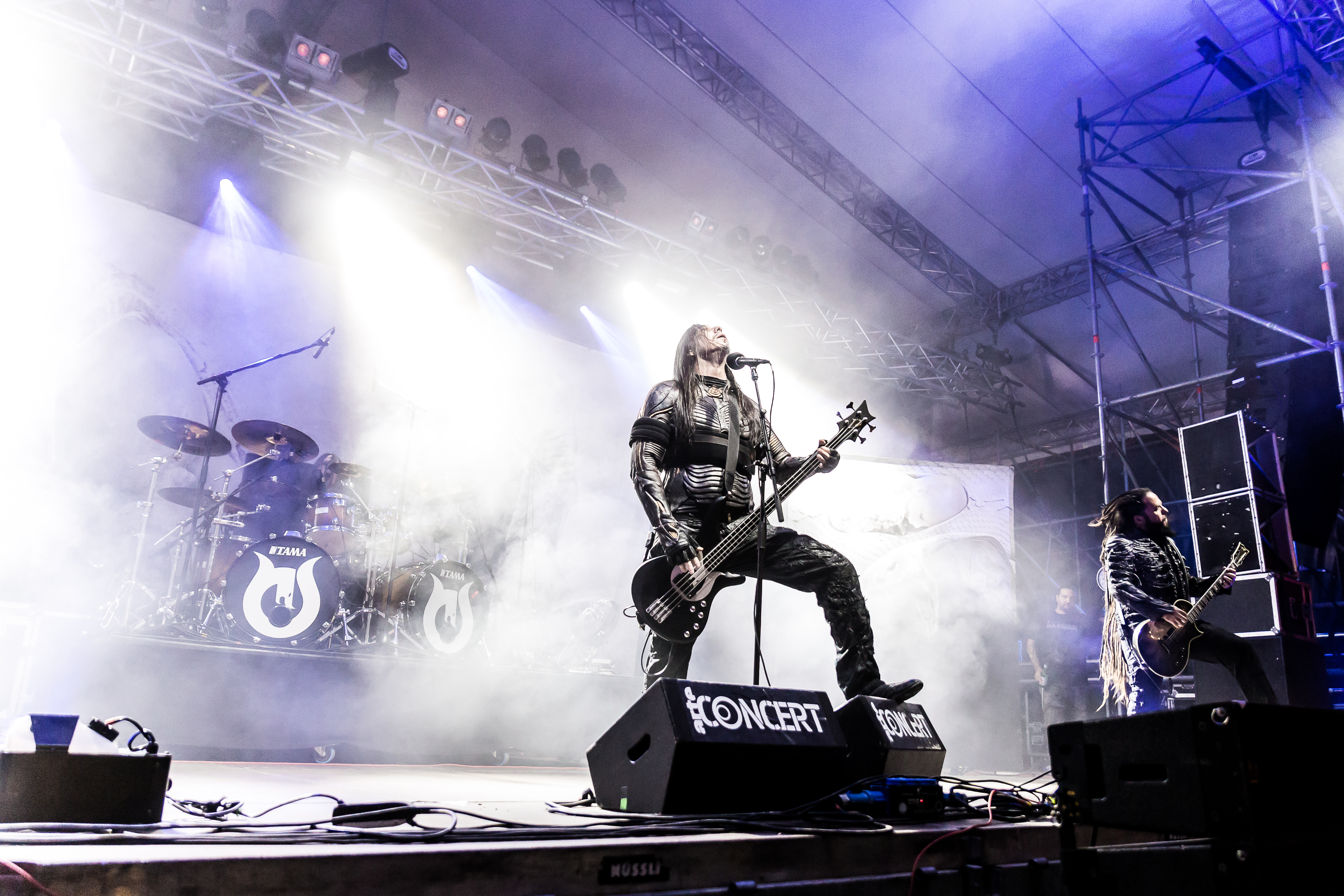
- Septicflesh at With Full Force 2018

Background information
- Also known as: Septic Flesh (1990–2003)
- Origin: Athens, Greece
- Genres: Symphonic death metal; death-doom (early)
- Years active: 1990–2003; 2007–present
- Labels: Holy Records; Hammerheart; Season of Mist; Prosthetic; Nuclear Blast
- Members: Spiros "Seth" Antoniou; Christos Antoniou; Sotiris Vayenas; Kerim "Krimh" Lechner; Dinos "Psychon" Prassas
- Past members: Akis "Lethe" Kapranos; Kostas Savvidis; George "Magus Wampyr Daoloth" Zaharopoulos; Fotis Benardo; Alexander Haritakis; Bob Katsionis
- Website: www.septicflesh.com

Septicflesh (stylized as SepticFlesh, formerly Septic Flesh) are a Greek death metal band from Athens, founded in 1990.

== History ==
Bassist/vocalist Spiros Antoniou, lead guitarist Christos Antoniou, and rhythm guitarist Sotiris Vayenas formed Septicflesh in Athens in March 1990. They released a debut EP, Temple of the Lost Race, in December with Black Power Records, 1991. The band recorded their first full-length album, Mystic Places of Dawn, in April 1994 at the Storm studio with co-producer Magus Wampyr Daoloth, who had played keyboardist in Rotting Christ, released by Holy Records. They started working on a new album for 1995, Esoptron. It was produced by Septic Flesh and George Zacharopoulos, recorded and mixed at Storm Studios in March–April 1995, mastered by Sonic Contact (France), and released by Holy Records

Session vocalist Natalie Rassoulis joined for The Ophidian Wheel (1997) and for A Fallen Temple (1998).

The group split up in October 2003. After the breakup, its members moved on to different or existing projects. Christos Antoniou continued with Chaostar, which he formed in 1998, and Katsionis played guitar for Nightfall and keyboards for Firewind. TheDevilWorx formed a year after Septic Flesh disbanded, and featured some members from Septic Flesh's original line-up. In March 2007, guitarist Sotiris Vayenas revealed his plans for a solo project called Aenaos.

On February 19, 2007, Septic Flesh announced a reunion for Greece's Metal Healing Festival featuring Orphaned Land, Rage and Aborted, set to take place July 20–22.

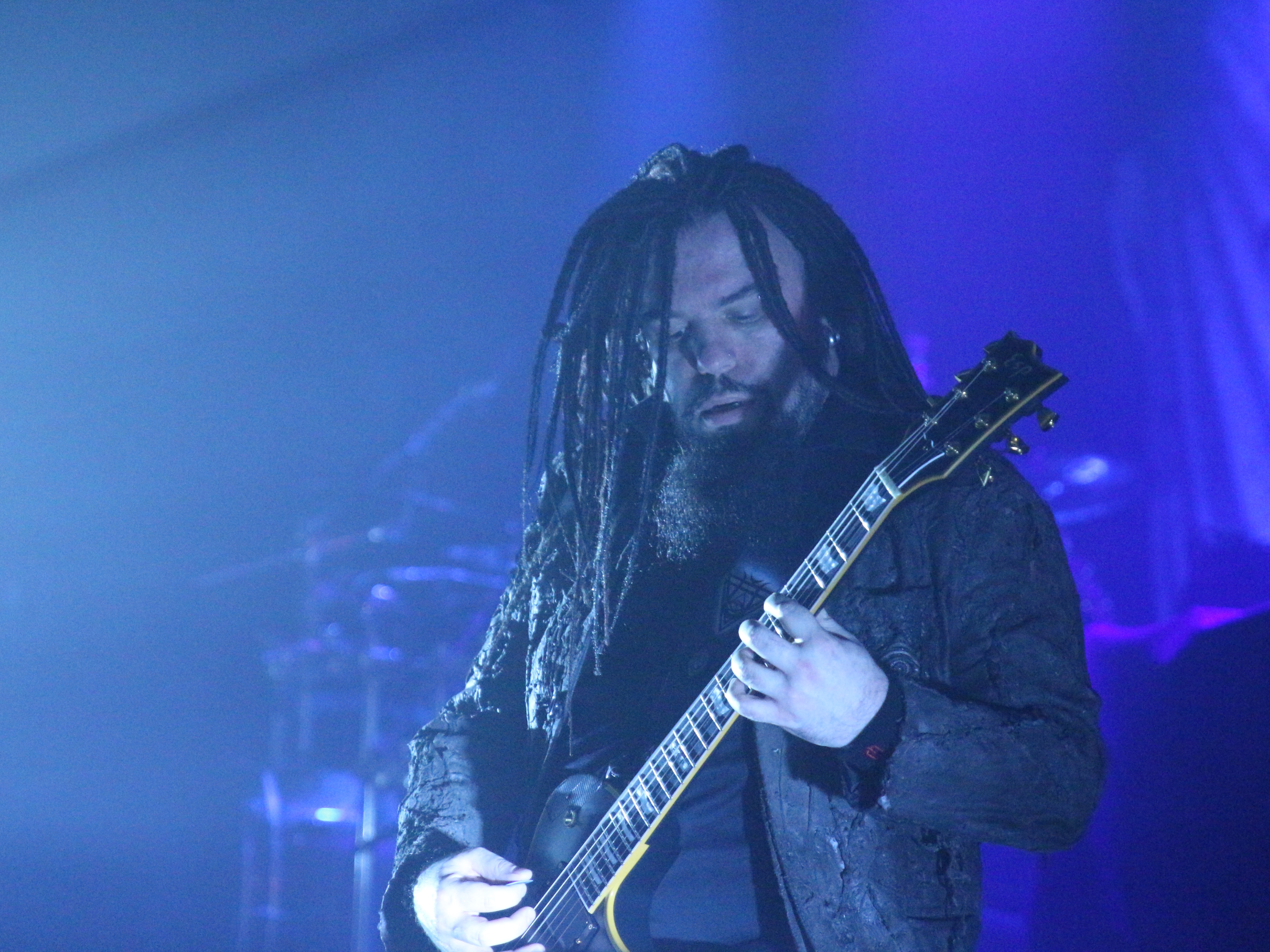
Christos Antoniou (2015)

On April 3, 2007, Blabbermouth.net reported the band reunited for a seventh full-length CD, for French record label Season of Mist. According to guitarist and composer Christos Antoniou, the release would feature a full orchestra and a choir, totalling 80 musicians and 32 singers. Septic Flesh finalized the new album, Communion, in Studio Fredman in Sweden. It was released in April 2008. By this time, the band changed its name from Septic Flesh to Septicflesh. According to guitarist Christos, it looked better and signaled a new phase in the band.

On September 10, 2009, the band announced that they had begun work on a new studio album, tentatively planned for release in the beginning of 2011.

On December 17, 2010, the band released the first single, "The Vampire From Nazareth", and announced that the album would be shipped on April 28 in the UK, and April 29 in the United States.

On February 12, 2014, the band released details about Titan. The album was released in June 2014. On December 15, 2014, it was announced that drummer Kerim "Krimh" Lechner had joined Septicflesh, following the departure of Fotis Benardo (a.k.a. Fotis Gianakopoulos).

In June 2016 interview, it was declared that, since early 2016, Septicflesh had been working on their tenth studio album, scheduled for release toward spring 2017. In early June 2017, band members claimed that Septicflesh's tenth album, Codex Omega, was officially due to release on September 1, 2017. Like Titan, Codex Omega was released through Prosthetic Records.

On August 29, 2018, it was announced that the band had signed to Nuclear Blast Records.

In February 2019, Septicflesh performed live with a full orchestra and choir, in a sold-out performance at the Teatro Metropólitan in Mexico City, Mexico. The show was recorded and released through Season of Mist in July 2020 as the band's first official live album, Infernus Sinfonica MMXIX, in audio and video format.

In 2020, the band announced the album Modern Primitive, released in May of 2022.

In September 2024, Septicflesh were the first metal band to perform in Odeon of Herodes Atticus, once again featuring a full orchestra and a choir.

== Band members ==
Septicflesh, live at With Full Force 2018

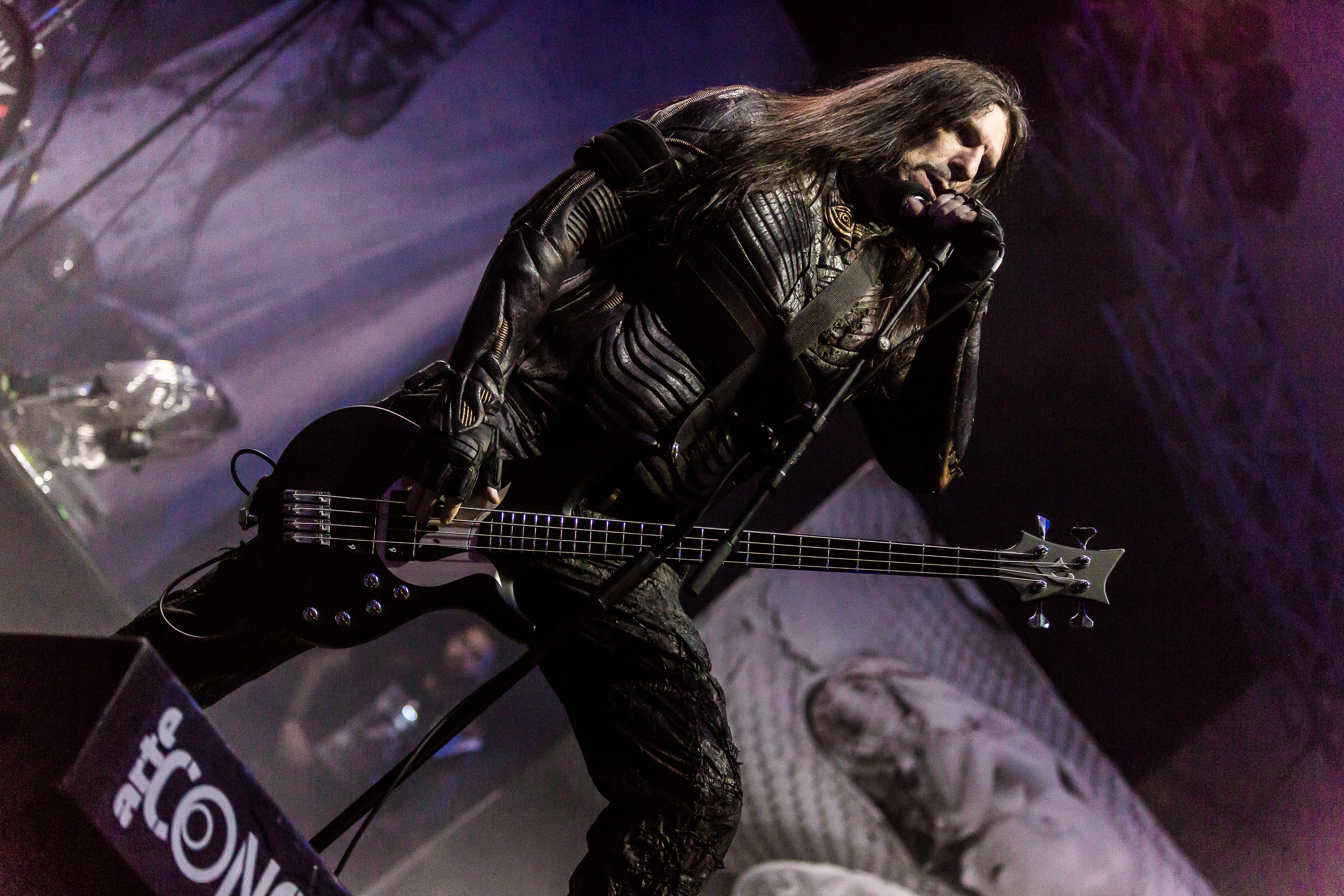
Singer and bassist Spiros Antoniou

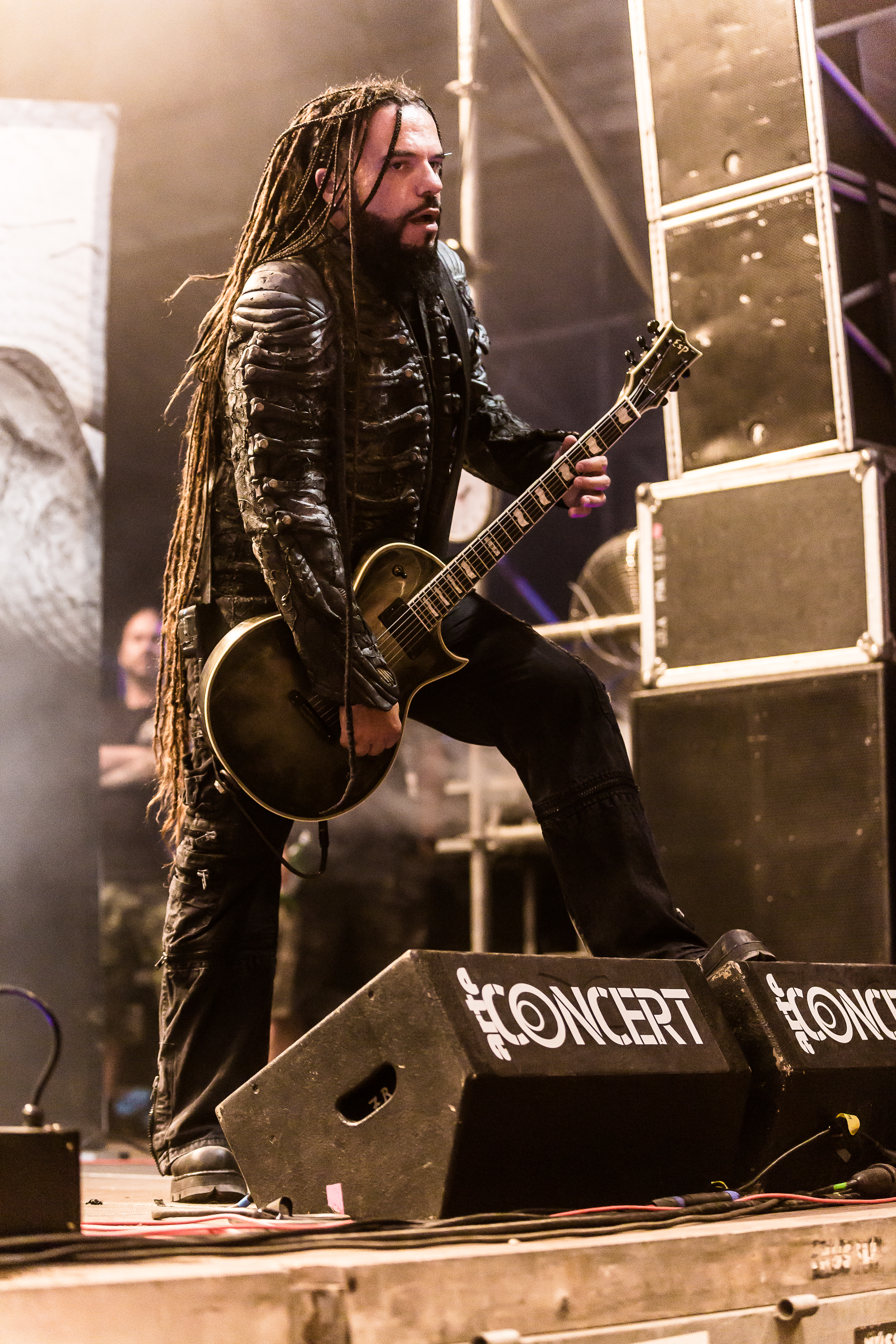
Lead guitarist Christos Antoniou

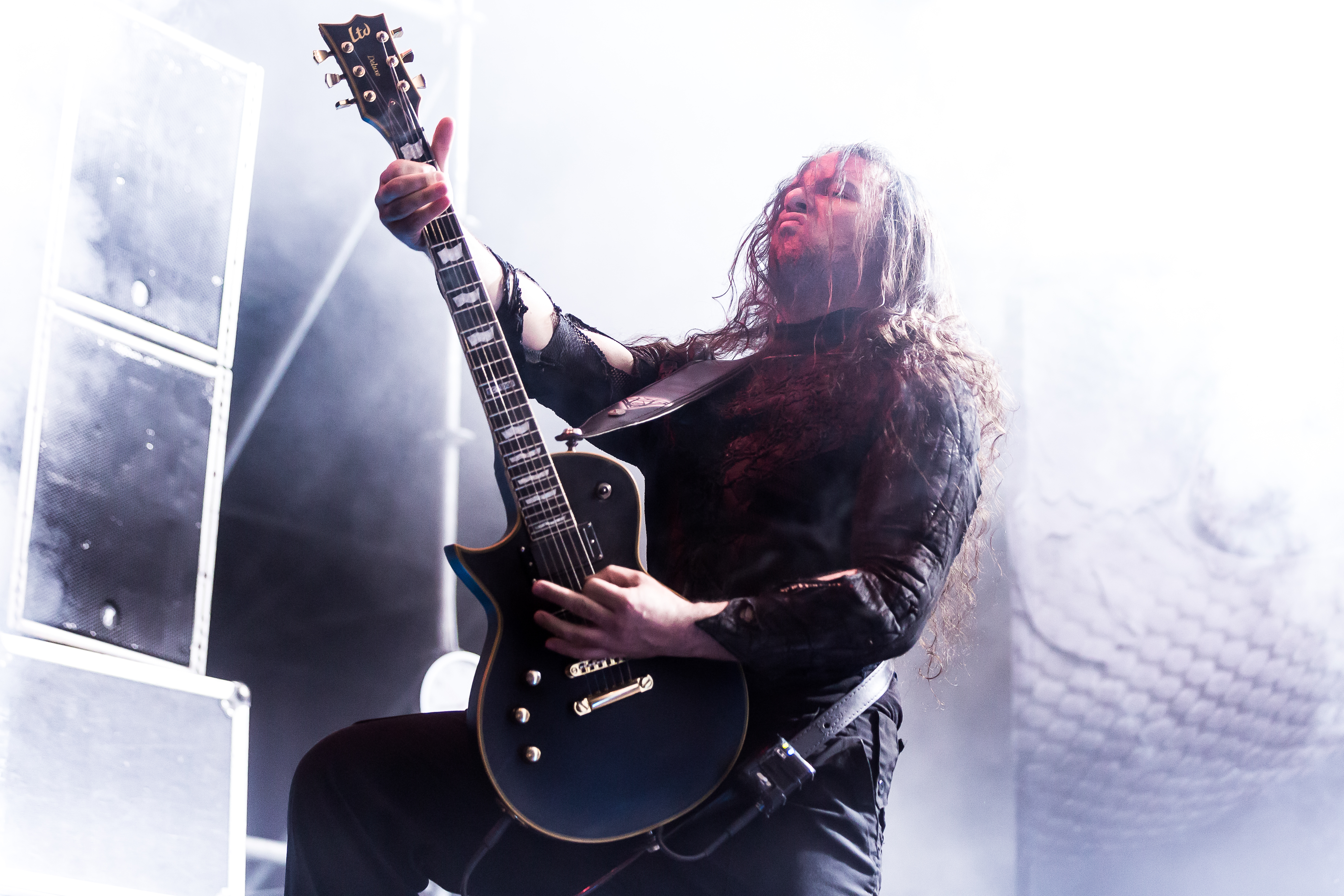
Rhythm guitarist Dinos Prassas

Current

- Spiros "Seth Siro Anton" Antoniou – bass, unclean vocals (1990–2003, 2007–present)
- Christos Antoniou – lead guitar (1990–2003, 2007–present)
- Sotiris Vayenas "Sotiris Anunnaki V." – clean vocals, keyboards, rhythm guitar (from 2018 studio only) (1990–2003, 2007–present)
- Kerim "Krimh" Lechner – drums (2014–present)
- Dinos "Psychon" Prassas – rhythm guitar (2018–present; touring 2008–2018)

Former

- Dimitris Valasopoulos – drums (1990–1991)
- Akis "Lethe" Kapranos – drums (1999–2003)
- Mohammad Mirboland – drums (1996–1998)
- George "Magus Wampyr Daoloth" Zaharopoulos – keyboards (2001–2003)
- Fotis Gianakopoulos – drums (2003, 2007–2014)

Session

- Kostas Savvidis – drums (1993–1997)
- Natalie Rassoulis – vocals (1997–1998)
- Bob Katsionis – keyboards (2003)

Timeline

== Discography ==
Studio albums

Year	Album details	Peak chart positions			
Year	Album details	BEL (WA)	FIN	FRA	US Heat
1994	Mystic Places of Dawn: Released: May 1994; Label: Holy Records, Season of Mist; Formats: CD, CS, LP, DL	—	—	—	—
1995	Esoptron: Released: May 1995; Label: Holy, Season of Mist; Formats: CD, CS, LP, DL	—	—	—	—
1997	Ophidian Wheel: Released: 1997; Label: Holy, Season of Mist; Formats: CD, CS, LP, DL	—	—	—	—
1998	A Fallen Temple: Released: 1998; Label: Holy, Season of Mist; Formats: CD, CS, LP, DL	—	—	—	—
1999	Revolution DNA: Released: July 12, 1999; Label: Holy; Formats: CD, CS, LP, DL	—	—	—	—
2003	Sumerian Daemons: Released: February 18, 2003; Label: Hammerheart; Formats: CD, CS, LP, DL	—	—	—	—
2008	Communion: Released: March 17, 2008; Label: Season of Mist; Formats: CD, CS, LP, DL	—	—	—	—
2011	The Great Mass: Released: April 18, 2011; Label: Season of Mist; Formats: CD, CS, LP, DL	—	—	132	—
2014	Titan: Released: June 20, 2014; Label: Season of Mist, Prosthetic, Ward Records; Formats: CD, CS, LP, DL	99	37	112	7
2017	Codex Omega: Released: September 1, 2017; Label: Season of Mist, Prosthetic, Ward; Formats: CD, CS, LP, DL	112	—	85	9
2022	Modern Primitive: Released: May 20, 2022; Label: Nuclear Blast; Formats: CD, LP, DL	104	—	138	—

EPs

- Temple of the Lost Race (EP, 1991)
- The Eldest Cosmonaut (EP, 1998)
- Amphibians (EP, 2025)

Singles

- "The Vampire from Nazareth" (2010)
- "Order of Dracul" (2014)

Live albums

- Live in Toulouse (June 20, 2014, Season of Mist, DL/Bonus CD)
- Infernus Sinfonica MMXIX (July 31, 2020, Season of Mist, CD/LP/DL & DVD/Blu-Ray)

== Music videos ==
Year	Title	Album	Director(s)
1998	"The Eldest Cosmonaut"	A Fallen Temple	A. Argiris, N. Kaltzis
2015	"Prometheus"	Titan	Jon Simvonis
2017	"Portrait of a Headless Man"	Codex Omega	Jon Simvonis
2018	"Martyr"	Codex Omega	Jon Simvonis
2022	"Hierophant"	Modern Primitive	Jon Simvonis
2022	"Neuromancer"	Modern Primitive	Jon Simvonis
