= Skiltron =

Argentinian folk metal band

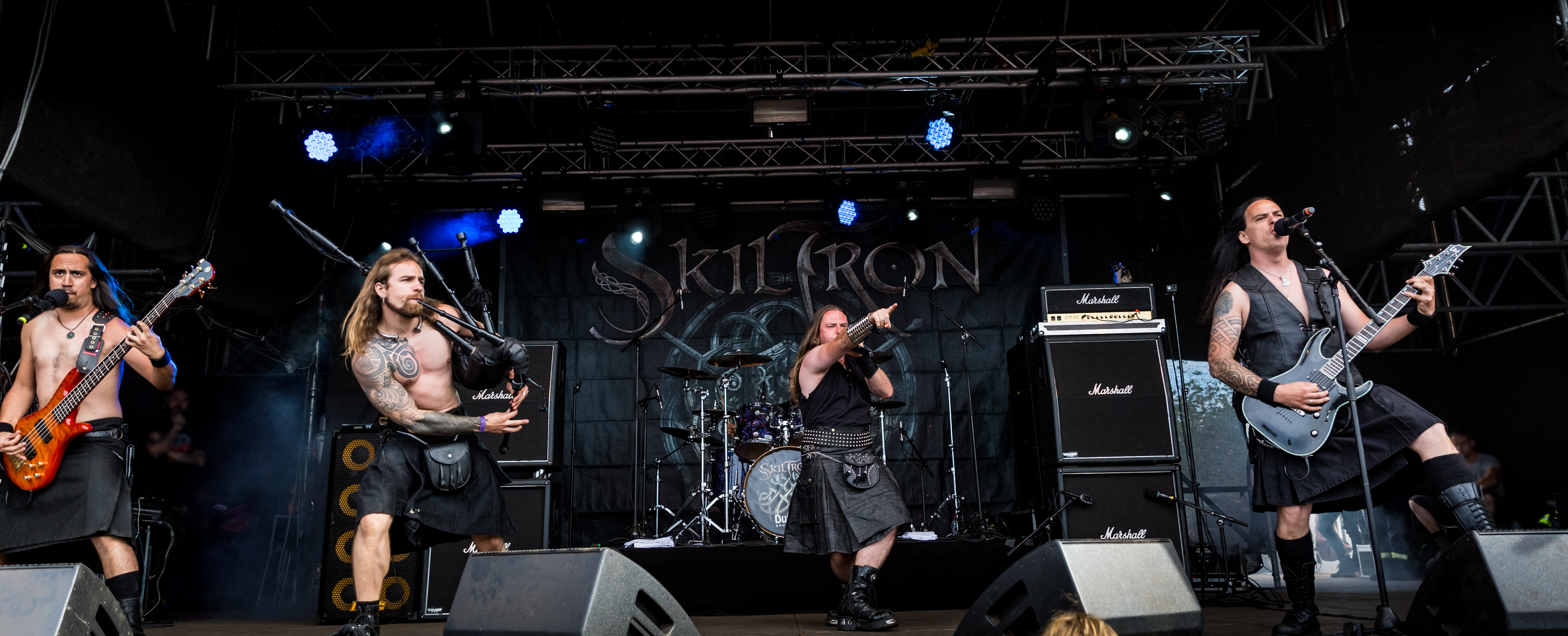
- Skiltron at Wacken Open Air 2018

Background information
- Genres: Celtic metal; folk metal; power metal
- Years active: 2004–present
- Label: Trollzorn Records
- Members: Martin McManus; Emilio Souto; Ignacio López; Pereg Ar Bagol; Joonas Nislin; Paolo Ribaldini
- Past members: Matias Pena; Fernando Marty; Pablo Allen; Juan José Fornés; Diego Spinelli; Esteban D'antona; Diego Valdez
- Website: skiltron.net

Skiltron is an Argentine Celtic/folk metal band formed in Buenos Aires in 2004 by Emilio Souto. Since 2018, the band has moved to Europe (Finland, Spain and France).

== History ==
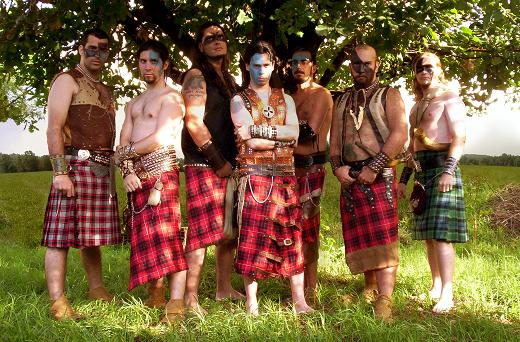
Skiltron in 2004

Starting with a three-song demo in 2004 called Gathering the Clans, the band released their full length debut album The Clans Have United in 2006 through the Italian label Underground Symphony. This was followed by their second album Beheading the Liars in 2008, and their third album, The Highland Way, in 2010, with each album continually building on the band's unique style and sound. Their most recent album is Legacy of Blood, released in 2016, released by Trollzorn Records.

Most of their early live concerts took place in Argentina, sharing the stage with bands such as Grave Digger, In Extremo and Korpiklaani, with whom the band shared a South American tour in 2010. They made their debut playing in Europe in the UK in 2012, where they were joined by Sabbat and Skyclad singer Martin Walkyier as a guest.

After the release of fourth album Into the Battleground in 2013, the band started to tour Europe regularly, playing festivals such as Wacken, Bloodstock and more. They were able to share the stage with bands such as Judas Priest, Slayer, In Flames, King Diamond, Avantasia, and more. The release of their latest album in 2016 was followed by a European tour, where they played 50 shows in two months in twenty countries. They toured the UK alongside pirate metal band Iron Seawolf. In early 2017, they played for the first time in Japan, sharing three shows with German bands Equilibrium and Suidakra.

== Artistry ==
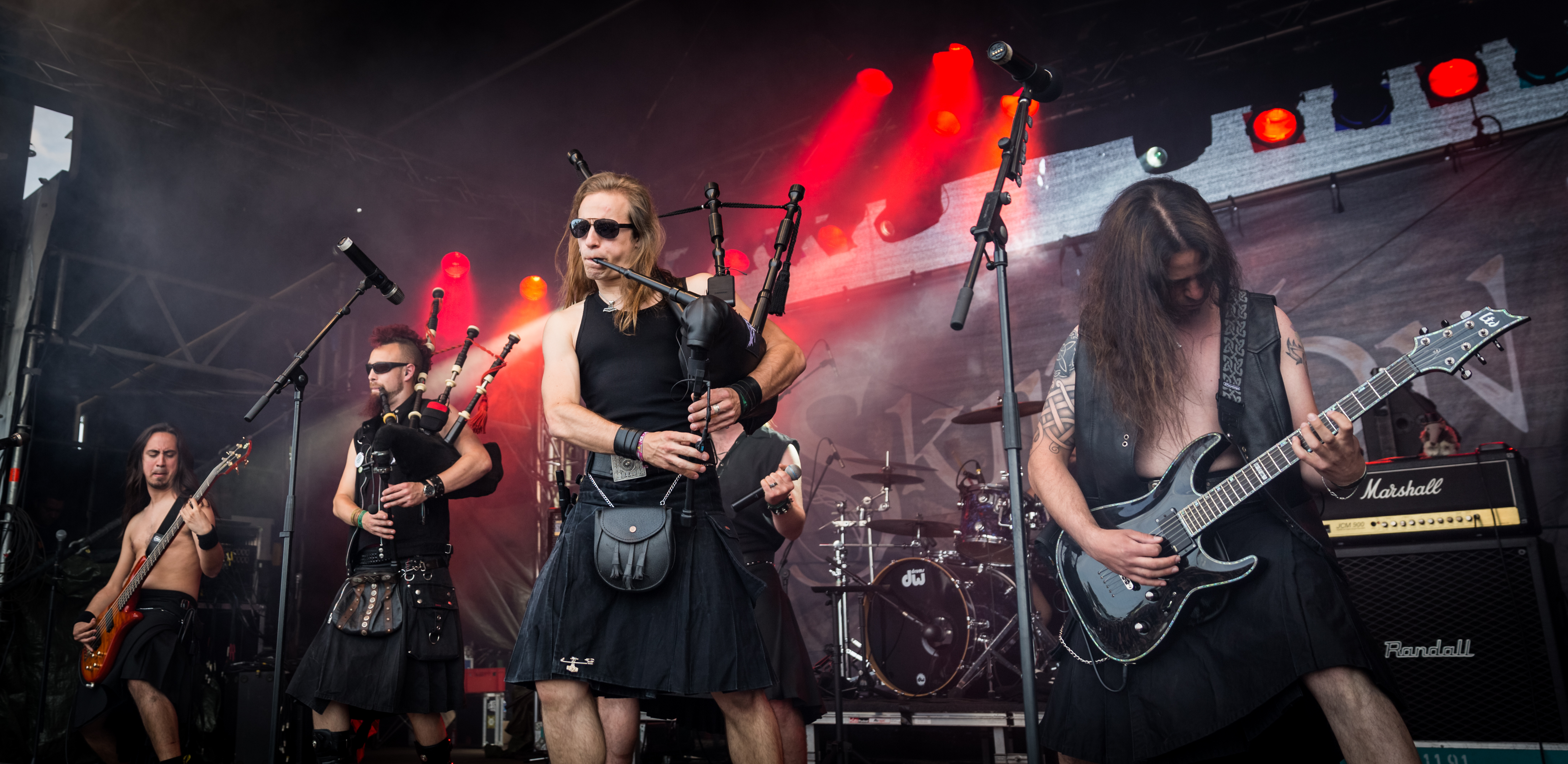
Skiltron at Wacken Open Air 2015

Skiltron are considered one of the few Southern American metal bands to fuse heavy metal and Celtic music, a style usually more common in many parts of Europe. They are also well known for incorporating bagpipes into their music. The lyrics are sung in English.

The name "Skiltron" derives from a variation of the word schiltron, a formation used by the Scottish during the Wars of Independence.

== Members ==
=== Current members ===
- Emilio Souto − guitar, mandolin, bouzouki (2004–present)
- Ignacio López – bass (2011–present)
- Pereg Ar Bagol – bagpipes (2014–present)
- Joona Nislin – drums (2018–present)
- Martin McManus – vocals (2015–2021, 2024–present)

=== Former members ===
- Paolo Ribaldini – vocals (2021–2024)
- Matias Pena − drums (2004–2018)
- Juan José Fornés − guitar (2006–2011)
- Fernando Marty − bass (2004–2011)
- Diego Valdez − vocals (2006–2011)
- Pablo Allen − bagpipes (2006–2011), tin whistle (2008–2011)
- Diego Spinelli – tin whistle, irish flute, piccolo (2006–2008)
- Esteban D'antona – viola (2006–2007)

== Discography ==
=== Demos ===
| Year | Title |
|---|---|
| 2004 | Gathering the Clans |
| 2007 | The Blind Harry |

=== Studio albums ===
| Year | Title |
|---|---|
| 2006 | The Clans Have United |
| 2008 | Beheading the Liars |
| 2010 | The Highland Way (CD+DVD) |
| 2013 | Into the Battleground |
| 2016 | Legacy of Blood |
| 2023 | Bruadarach |
