= Tristitia =

Swedish doom metal band

- Origin: Halmstad, Sweden
- Genres: Death metal, doom metal, death-doom
- Label: Holy Records
- Members: Luis Beethoven Galvez, Wilhelm, Thomas Hedlund

Tristitia is a Swedish doom metal band formed in Halmstad in 1992.

== History ==
The band was founded by Chilean / Swedish guitarist Luis Beethoven Galvez. His devotion for doom metal and sorrowful melodies brought him to form the band with death/gothic style singer Thomas Karlsson and Harri Juvonen on bass.

They recorded their first demo in April ’93 entitled ”Winds of Sacrifice”. In January ’94 they released their second demo ”Reminiscences of the Mourner”. The reception of this demo was even better than ”Winds of Sacrifice” and gave Tristitia a record deal with the French label Holy Records. In march ’95 now with Bruno Nilsson behind the drums, Thomas on vocals and Luis playing all guitars, bass and keyboards,

Tristitia released their first CD album One with Darkness. In summer ’96 they recorded their second album Crucidiction which was released December ’96. Tristitia’s third album The Last Grief brought the band a new atmospheric dark doom heavy metal singing style with session singer Rickard Bengtsson from the Swedish band Last Tribe and with mixed doom riffs/classical guitar parts Tristitia found a new path beyond the labyrinth of Darkness. In fall 2002 the band was ready for their fourth album and entered Darkside Studios in their hometown Halmstad to record their CD Garden of Darkness with Death style vocalist Stefan Persson. "Tristitia" is Latin for "sadness."

Luis Beethoven Galvez was a Chilean-Swedish musician, who besides Tristitia, was the founder of founder of Darkstone, Gardeniathan and Swordblood. Galvez died on 10 August 2023 in Halmstad, Sweden at 59 years old.

== Members ==
=== Current lineup ===
- Luis B. Galvez – guitar
- Thomas Karlsson – vocals
- Wilhelm – bass
- Thomas Hedlund – drums

=== Former members ===
- Harri Juvonen – bass
- Adrian Letelier – bass
- Bruno Nilsson – drums
- Alessio – drums
- Rickard Bengtsson – session vocals on The Last Grief
- Stefan Persson – vocals
- Daniel Nilssen – session keyboard live

== Discography ==
- One with Darkness (1995)
- Crucidiction (1997)
- The Last Grief (2000)
- Garden of Darkness (2002)
- Burial of the Sad (2020)
- Doomystic (2022)

=== Demos ===
- Winds of Sacrifice (1993)
- Reminiscences of the Mourner (1994)

=== Other ===
- Lamentations from the beginning (Compilation, 2017)
- Lamentations of Darkness (Boxed set, 2023)
