= Stille Volk =

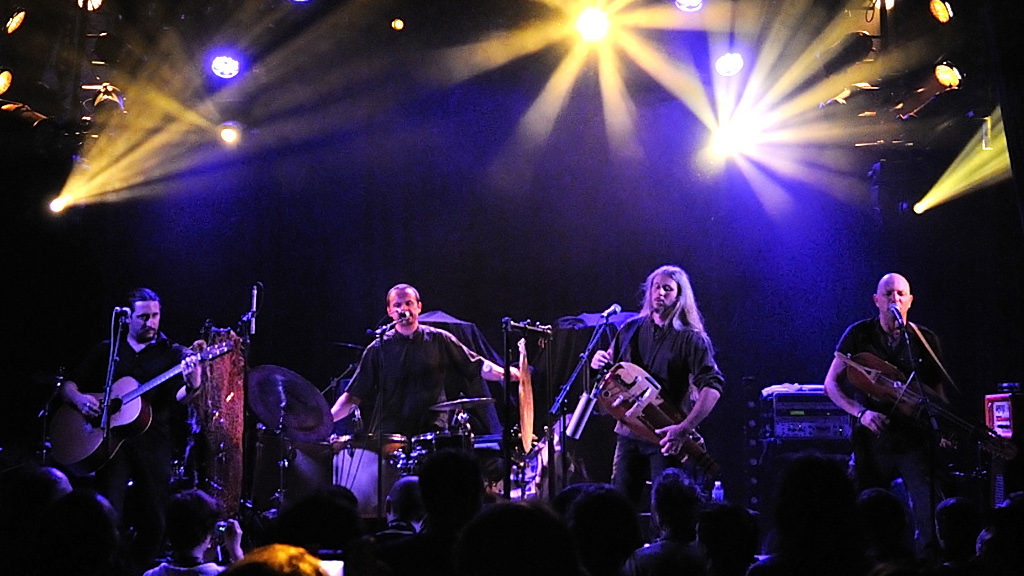
- Stille Volk in 2013. Left to right: Sarg, Yan Arexis, Patrick Lafforgue and Patrice Roques

Background information
- Origin: Occitania, France
- Genres: Medieval music Celtic music Folk metal
- Years active: 1994–present
- Label: Holy Records
- Members: Patrick Lafforgue; Patrice Roques
- Past members: Yan Arexis
- Website: official website

Stille Volk (meaning "The Silent People" in Dutch and German) is a folk band from the Pyrenees area of France. The band formed in 1994, and draws inspiration from Celtic and medieval music.

The members play mostly, sometimes exclusively, traditional instruments (except on the more experimental album Ex-uvies). The lyrics are usually sung in French, Catalan or Occitan, and are mostly pagan-themed, evoking nature, myths, magical beings and sorcery. The band members identify with a form of paganism they define as a nature-based aesthetic and having a subjective view of the world; they reject organised religion and political interpretations of paganism.

The band is sometimes associated with the folk metal genre, probably due to the use of electric guitars on the Ex-uvies album. The other albums, however, are not related to this genre in any way. It is notable, though, that the two members of Stille Volk play together in a folk metal band called Hantaoma, highly reminiscent of Stille Volk.

The name "Stille Volk" comes from "Encyclopedia of Elves" by Pierre Dubois where it was a name for "troglodyte elves [i.e. dwarves] from German mythology". The phrase "Stille Volk" is ungrammatical in German.

== Members ==
=== Current members ===
- Patrick Lafforgue – vocals, wind instruments
- Patrice Roques – string instruments, choirs
- Arexis – percussion
- Sarg – string guitar, bagpipe, choirs (live)

=== Former members ===
- Fred Neheride – drums

== Instruments ==
- Arab lute
- Bagpipes
- Bombarde
- Bouzouki
- Dulcimer
- Drum machine
- Flute
- Guimbarde
- Guitar
- Horn
- Hurdy-gurdy
- Mandolin
- Nyckelharpa
- Portable organ
- Psaltery
- String tambourine
- Violin

== Discography ==
- Hantaoma - 1997, Holy Records
- Ex-uvies - 1998, Holy Records
- Satyre Cornu - 2001, Holy Records
- Maudat - 2002, Holy Records
- Nueit De Sabbat - 2009, Holy Records
- Pèira Negra - 2014, Holy Records
- Milharis - 2019, Prophecy Productions

== See also ==
- Hantaoma is a folk metal band named after the first Stille Volk album featuring Patrick Lafforgue and Patrice Roques. Their debut album, Malombra, was released in 2005. The lyrics are sung entirely in Occitan.
- Sus Scrofa is a folk metal band co-founded by Arexis & Patrick Lafforgue. The band was formed in 1991, and split in 1994. The band reunited in 2015.
