= Misanthrope (band) =

French metal band

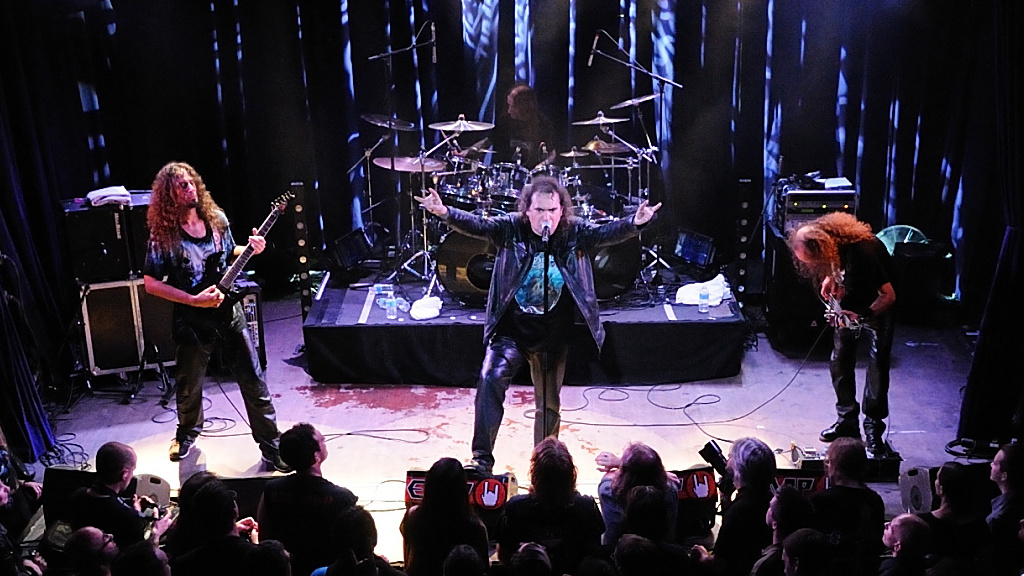
- Misanthrope in 2013. Counter-clockwise: Anthony Scemama, Phillipe de l'Argilière, Jean-Jacques Moréac and Gaël Féret

Background information
- Origin: France
- Genres: Avant-garde metal; melodic death metal; progressive death metal
- Years active: 1988–present
- Label: Holy Records
- Members: Phillipe De L'Argilière; Anthony Scemama; Jean-Jacques Moréac; Gaël Feret
- Past members: see text
- Website: Official site

Misanthrope is a French metal band, formed in 1988. The name was taken from Molière's play Le Misanthrope, reflecting the band's theatrical style and the influence of the French dramatist on their music and lyrics.

The band's genre evades categorization, but can be compared to bands from the progressive and technical death metal genres, such as Opeth or In Flames, with a wide array of tempo and style changes. The band uses keyboards and features clean vocals alongside the traditional death grunt.

== Discography ==
- Inductive Theories (demo, 1989)
- Crisis of Soul (demo, 1990)
- Hater of Mankind (split LP, 1991)
- Variation on Inductive Theories/Kingdom of the Dark (full-length, 1993)
- Miracles: Totem Taboo (full-length, 1994)
- 1666...Théâtre Bizarre (full-length, 1995)
- Visionnaire (full-length, 1997)
- Libertine Humiliations (full-length, 1998)
- Misanthrope Immortel (full-length, 2000)
- Recueil d'Écueils: les Épaves et Autres Oeuvres Interdites (compilation, 2000)
- Sadistic Sex Daemon (full-length, 2003)
- Misanthro-Thérapie (15 Années d'Analyse) (compilation, 2004)
- Metal Hurlant (double full-length, 2005)
- IrremeDIABLE (full-length, 2008)
- Ænigma Mystica (double full-length, 2013)
- Alpha X Omega (full-length, 2017)
- Bâtisseur de Cathédrales: Les Fissures de l'Édifice (EP, 2020)
- Misanthrope Immortel 2021 - 20th Anniversary Edition (full-length, 2021)
- Les déclinistes (full-length, 2023)
- Live - Immortal Wars in Eden (live album, 2024)
- Death Ascent (EP, 2025)
- Tribute to Their Majesties (full-length, 2025)
- Embrasement (full-length, 2026)

== Members ==
=== Current members ===
- Phillipe De L'Argilière - vocals (1988–present), guitars (1988-1999)
- Anthony Scemama - guitars/keyboards (2002–present)
- Jean-Jacques Moréac - bass/keyboards (1992–present)
- Gaël Feret - drums (2001–present)

=== Former members ===
- Charles-Henri Moréac - guitars (1992-1994)
- Jean-Baptiste Boitel - guitars/keyboards (1995-2005)
- Xavier Boscher - guitars (1999-2001)
- David Barrault - bass (1988-1990), drums (1990-1992)
- Lionel Bolore - bass (1990-1992; died 2021)
- Sebastien Castelain - drums (1988-1990)
- Olivier Gaubert - drums (1993-1995)
- Johansson Offhenstruh - drums (1996-1997)
- Alexis Phélipot - drums (1998-2001)
- Alexandre Iskandar Hasnawi - keyboards (1995-1996)
- Sergio Gruz - keyboards (1997-1999)
- Bénédicte Archipiade Albanhac - keyboards (2000-2001)
