= The Clans Have United =

2006 debut studio album by Skiltron

Studio album by Skiltron
- Released: March 2006
- Recorded: April – October 2005
- Studio: La Nave de Osberg Studios

The Clans Have United is Skiltron's first studio album. It was released in 2006.

The album was recorded between April and October 2005, in the La Nave de Osberg studios in Buenos Aires. It was released in March 2006. Javier Yuchechen was the sessionist vocalist, and local Celtic musicians also participated.

At the end of 2006, The Clans Have United was named best album of the year on the radio show Tiempos Violentos.

== Track listing ==
No.	Title	Length
1.	"Tartan's March"	2:15
2.	"By Sword and Shield"	5:23
3.	"Sixteen Years After"	5:03
4.	"This Crusade"	5:45
5.	"Rising Soul"	1:02
6.	"Pagan Pride"	3:52
7.	"Stirling Bridge"	4:09
8.	"Gathering the Clans"	4:53
9.	"Coming from the West"	4:41
10.	"Across the Centuries"	7:09
11.	"Spinning Jenny" (bonus track)	2:52
Total length:		47:04
