= Rajna =

Rajna is a surname. In several Eastern European languages such as Hungarian, Rajna is the name of the river Rhine.

Notable people with this surname include:

- András Rajna (born 1960), Hungarian sprint canoer
- Daniel Rajna (born 1968), South African ballet dancer
- Michele Rajna (1854-1920), Italian mathematician and astronomer
- Mihály Rácz Rajna (born 1934), Hungarian stage actor
- Miklós Rajna (born 1991), Hungarian ice hockey goaltender
- Pio Rajna (1847-1930), Italian philologist and literary critic
- Rajna Dragićević, Serbian linguist, lexicologist and lexicographer
- Thomas Rajna (1928–2021), British composer
