= Elend (band) =

French neoclassical dark wave band

- Origin: France
- Genre: Neoclassical dark wave
- Years active: 1993–present
- Members: Iskandar Hasnawi; Renaud Tschirner; Sébastien Roland; David Kempf; Esteri Rémond
- Past members: Eve-Gabrielle Siskind; Nathalie Barbary
- Website: Official website

Elend is a neoclassical dark wave band formed in France in 1993 by composers and multi-instrumentalists Iskandar Hasnawi of France and Renaud Tschirner of Austria. The band's name is German for "misery." Their music can be described as a combination of contemporary classical music and gothic.

== Stylistic overview ==
Early Elend albums utilized samplers and synthesizers to create a dense and horrifying orchestral sound. In their last three albums for the Winds Cycle, Elend's sound was broadened; they did now rely almost entirely on acoustic instruments and chamber orchestras instead of synthesizers, giving them a more full and natural sound. They did also include electronic and industrial elements in some of their pieces.

Elend's sound tended toward the aggressive, containing harsh dissonance, screaming and growled vocals in a manner associated with certain types of contemporary classical music. Vocalists, spoken-word passages and occasional rock-like song structures lend the music elements from art rock and gothic rock. Though Elend's music is not any form of metal, Elend's members are associated with numerous metal acts and the metal record label Holy Records, and their harsh sound has led to Elend's music being embraced by a metal-listening audience.

The Winds Cycle was originally intended to consist of five albums, however it was changed to a trilogy prior to the release of A World in Their Screams. In an interview with a French magazine posted in June 2007 on their website, Iskander Hasnawi indicated that the costs and difficulties of recording the orchestral music associated with Elend have made it impossible to continue with the Elend project. Both composers will be continuing with personal projects, including L'Ensemble Orphique.

== Members ==
=== 2007 : Final full member listing ===
- Alexandre Iskandar Hasnaoui: various instruments (1993—present)
- Renaud Tschirner: various instruments (1993—present)
- Sébastien Roland: keyboards, programming, engineering (1997—present)
- David Kempf: violin (2000—present)
- Esteri Rémond: soprano vocals (2003—present)
- Laura Angelmayer: soprano vocals
- Shinji Chihara: violin, viola
- Klaus Amann: trumpet, horn, trombone
- Simon Eberl - industrial landscapes and noises

=== Past member listing ===
- Nathalie Barbary: soprano vocals (1995—2003)
- Eve-Gabrielle Siskind: soprano vocals (1994—1995)

== Discography ==
=== Albums ===
1. Officium Tenebrarum
  1. Leçons de Ténèbres (Holy Records, 1994)
  2. Les Ténèbres du Dehors (Holy Records, 1996, reissued 2001 with a bonus track)
  3. The Umbersun (Music for Nations, 1998)
2. Winds Cycle
  1. Winds Devouring Men (Holy Records/Prophecy Productions, 2003)
  2. Sunwar the Dead (Holy Records/Prophecy Productions, 2004)
  3. A World in Their Screams (April 23, 2007)

=== Other ===
1. Weeping Nights (Holy Records, 1997)
