= Spiros Antoniou =

Greek musician

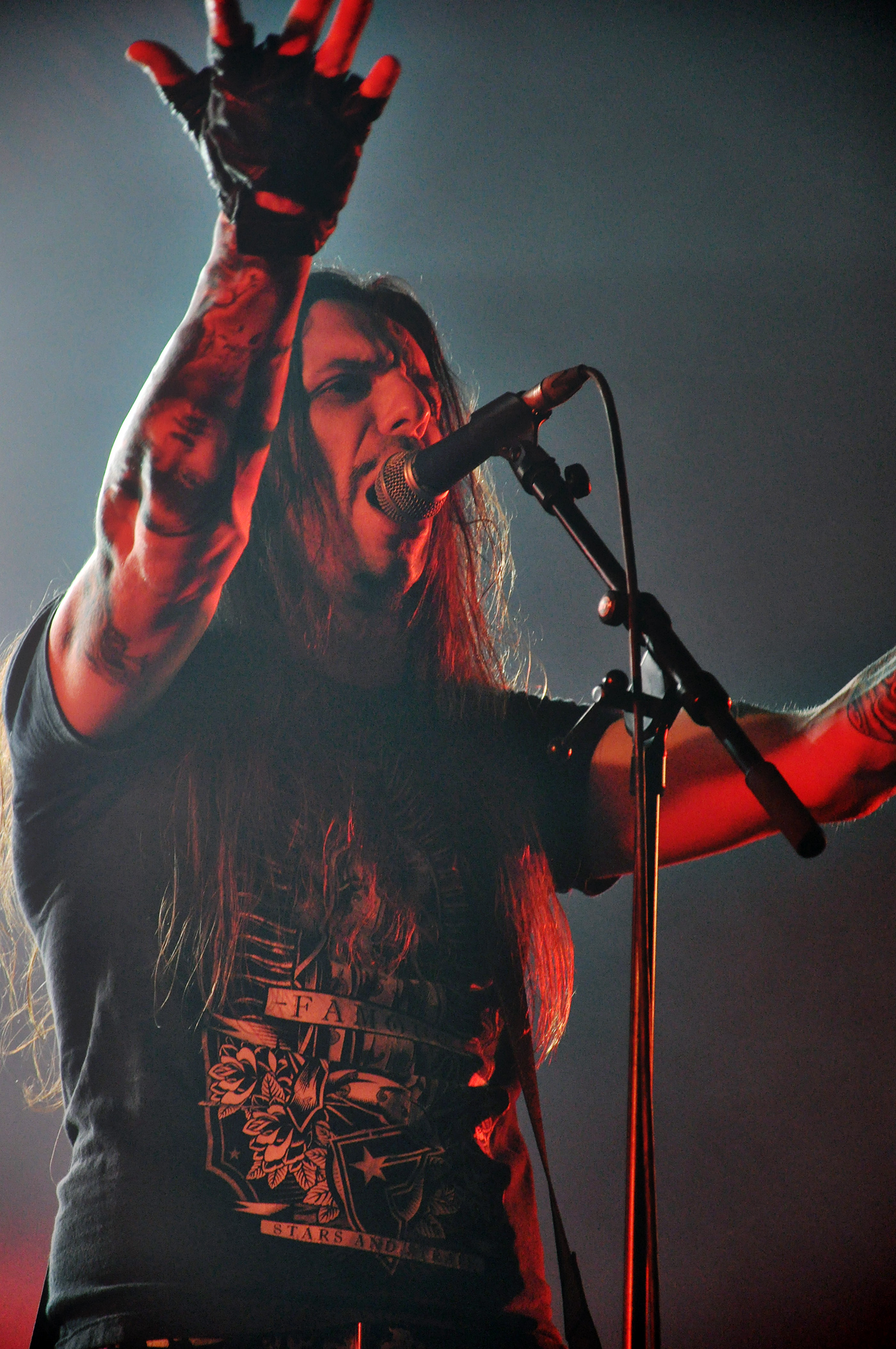
- Antoniou in 2009

Background information
- Also known as: Seth Siro Anton, Seth, Siro A.
- Born: 24 October 1973 (age 52); Athens, Greece
- Genres: Symphonic death metal; death metal; black metal; dark ambient; hardcore punk
- Occupations: Musician, artist
- Instruments: Bass guitar, vocals
- Website: sethsiroanton.com

Spiros Antoniou (Greek: Σπύρος Αντωνίου; born 24 October 1973) is a Greek extreme metal vocalist and bassist best known for his work with the symphonic death metal band Septicflesh, in which he has been since its 1990 foundation and of which he is a founding member. He has also contributed to bands such as TheDevilWorx, Chaostar, and Thou Art Lord.

Antoniou is also a visual artist under the pseudonym Seth Siro Anton. He made the cover art for almost every Septicflesh release (including re-issues), as well as several cover paintings for other bands such as: Decapitated, Devian, Vader, Paradise Lost, Belphegor, Nile, Soilwork, Caliban, Heaven Shall Burn, Serenity, Kamelot, Flowing Tears, Moonspell, Methedras, Universum, The Foreshadowing, and Old Man's Child.
