= Holy Records =

- Founder: Phillipe De L'Argilière
- Genre: Heavy metal
- Country of origin: France
- Official website: www.holyrecords.com/

Holy Records is a French metal label run by Misanthrope frontman Phillipe De L'Argilière. Aside from Misanthrope itself, the label has not signed many French bands, but also corresponds with several Greek bands.

== History ==
Holy Records was founded in September 1992 by Philippe Courtois de l'Argilière (Misanthrope) and Séverine Foujanet.

== Current and former artists ==
- Am'ganesha'n
- Argile
- Balrog
- Chaostar
- Division Alpha
- Elend
- Exhumation
- Frozen Shadows
- Garwall
- Gloomy Grim
- Godsend
- Hantaoma
- Hectic Patterns
- Inactive Messiah
- Kadenzza
- Legenda
- Misanthrope
- Mistaken Element
- Natron
- Nightfall
- Ominous
- On Thorns I Lay
- Orakle
- Orphaned Land
- Rajna
- Septic Flesh
- Serenity
- Soulgrind
- Stille Volk
- S.U.P
- Trepalium
- Tristitia
- Ufych Sormeer
- Yearning
